= Leifur Muller =

Icelandic concentration camp victim (1920–1988)

- Born: 3 September 1920; Reykjavík, Iceland
- Died: 24 August 1988 (aged 67)
- Citizenship: Iceland; Norway
- Known for: Autobiography; detained in Nazi concentration camps
- Notable work: Í fangabúðum nasista (1945); Býr Íslendingur hér? (1988)
- Spouse: Birna Sveinsdóttir (1951-1988)
- Children: 5
- Parents: Lorentz H. Müller; Marie Bertelsen

Leifur Muller (born Müller; (Note: Leifur changed his last name to Muller after the war to avoid being perceived as a German.) 3 September 1920 – 24 August 1988) was an Icelandic merchant who was arrested by the Gestapo in Oslo in 1942. He was a prisoner in Sachsenhausen concentration camp in Oranienburg, (Note: Concentration camp ID number, Sachsenhausen concentration camp: 68138.) until he was freed in the White Buses operation in 1945.

Leifur wrote the autobiographical book Í fangabúðum nasista (transl. In the concentration camps of Nazis) about his time as a prisoner of the Nazis, which was among the first books published about the Holocaust in 1945. In 1988, Garðar Sverrisson's accounts of Leifur's memoirs, Býr Íslendingur hér? (transl. Does an Icelander live here?), were published.

== Early life ==
Leifur was born in Reykjavík on 3 September 1920. His parents, Lorentz H. Müller and Marie Bertelsen, were of Norwegian descent. He had two sisters; Tonný, born in 1916, and Gerd, born in 1913. His parents owned and ran Verslun L.H. Müller, a sporting goods store on Austurstræti in Reykjavik, in a house that has since been demolished.

Because Leifur had a stutter growing up, he grew up mainly speaking Norwegian at home, which affected his Icelandic.

When Leifur was seven years old, he went to Landakotsskóli, a Catholic private school, (Note: The school is no longer affiliated with the Catholic Church today.) and then continued his education at Menntaskólinn í Reykjavík. After graduating in 1937, he worked in his parents' store for one year until he was sent to Norway in 1939 to study.

== Life in Norway ==
Otto Treiders Handelsskole in Oslo

Leifur was sent to Oslo in 1938 to study at Otto Treiders Handelsskole, as he was meant to eventually take over the family's sporting goods store. He took a course in Copenhagen in 1939, before returning to his studies in Oslo in the fall of the same year. Norway was occupied by the Nazis in April 1940.

=== Arrest ===
In October 1942, Ólafur Pétursson invited Leifur and his friend, Svanhvít Friðriksdóttir, for coffee. They revealed their plans to escape occupied Norway to Ólafur, telling him that they had both applied for permission to travel to Sweden under the pretext that they were going to study there. They revealed to Ólafur that their plan was to travel to the United Kingdom, and to Iceland from there. Shortly after the meeting, Leifur and Svanhvít were granted permission to travel to Sweden. Most likely, Ólafur Pétursson informed Gestapo of the plan shortly after this meeting.

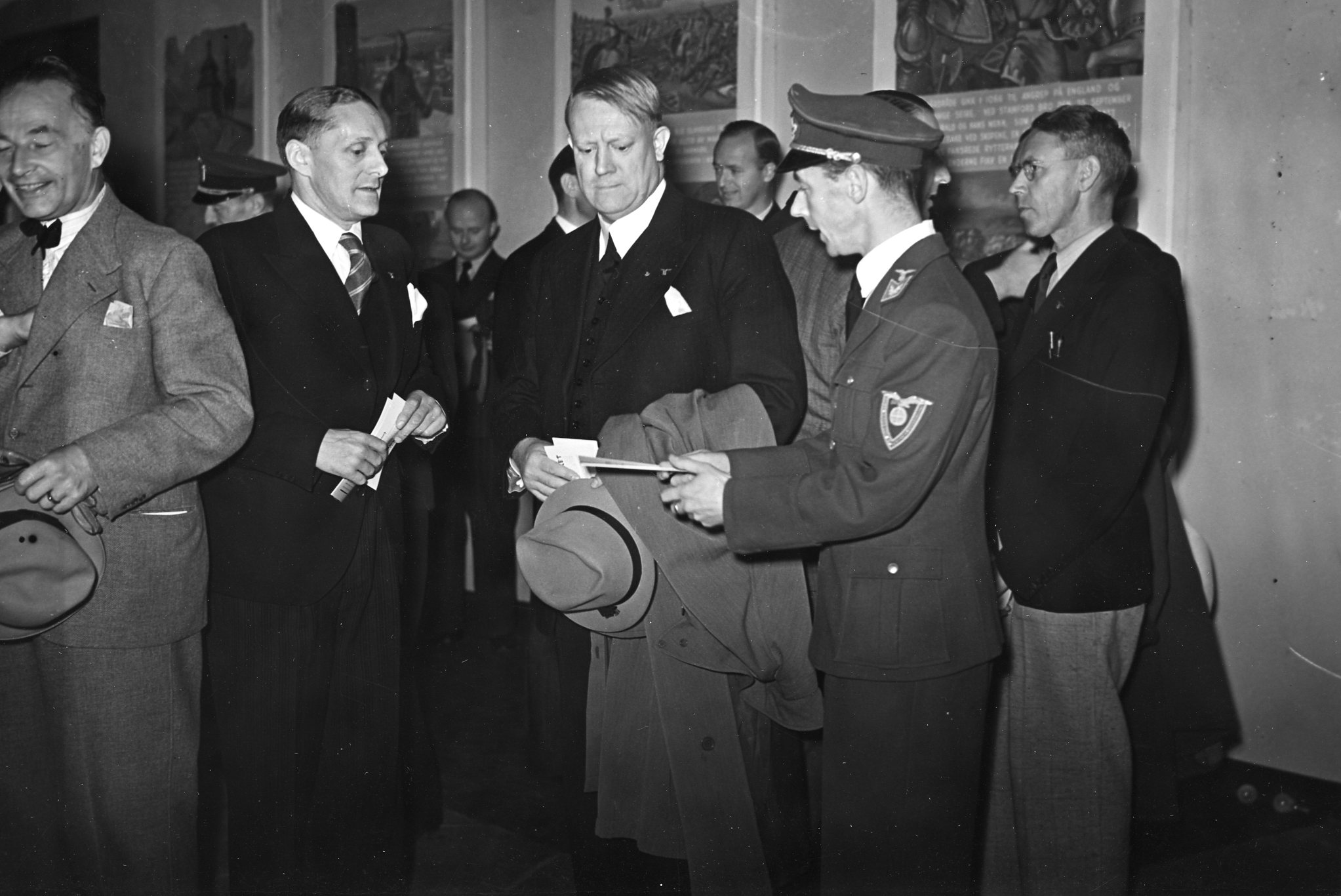
Hustad, Egill Holmboe, Vidkun Quisling, Lunde and Beggerud in 1941

Egill Holmboe, a family friend, Nazi collaborator, and a member of Nasjonal Samling, was also told of the plan.

Leifur was arrested by the Gestapo in Oslo on 21 October 1942, and taken to Victoria Terrasse where he was interrogated.

=== Møllergata 19 ===
Interrogated and imprisoned Møllergata 19, (Note: Prisoner ID number, Møllergata 19: 3665.) where he was held until he was transferred in January 1943.

=== Grini detention camp ===
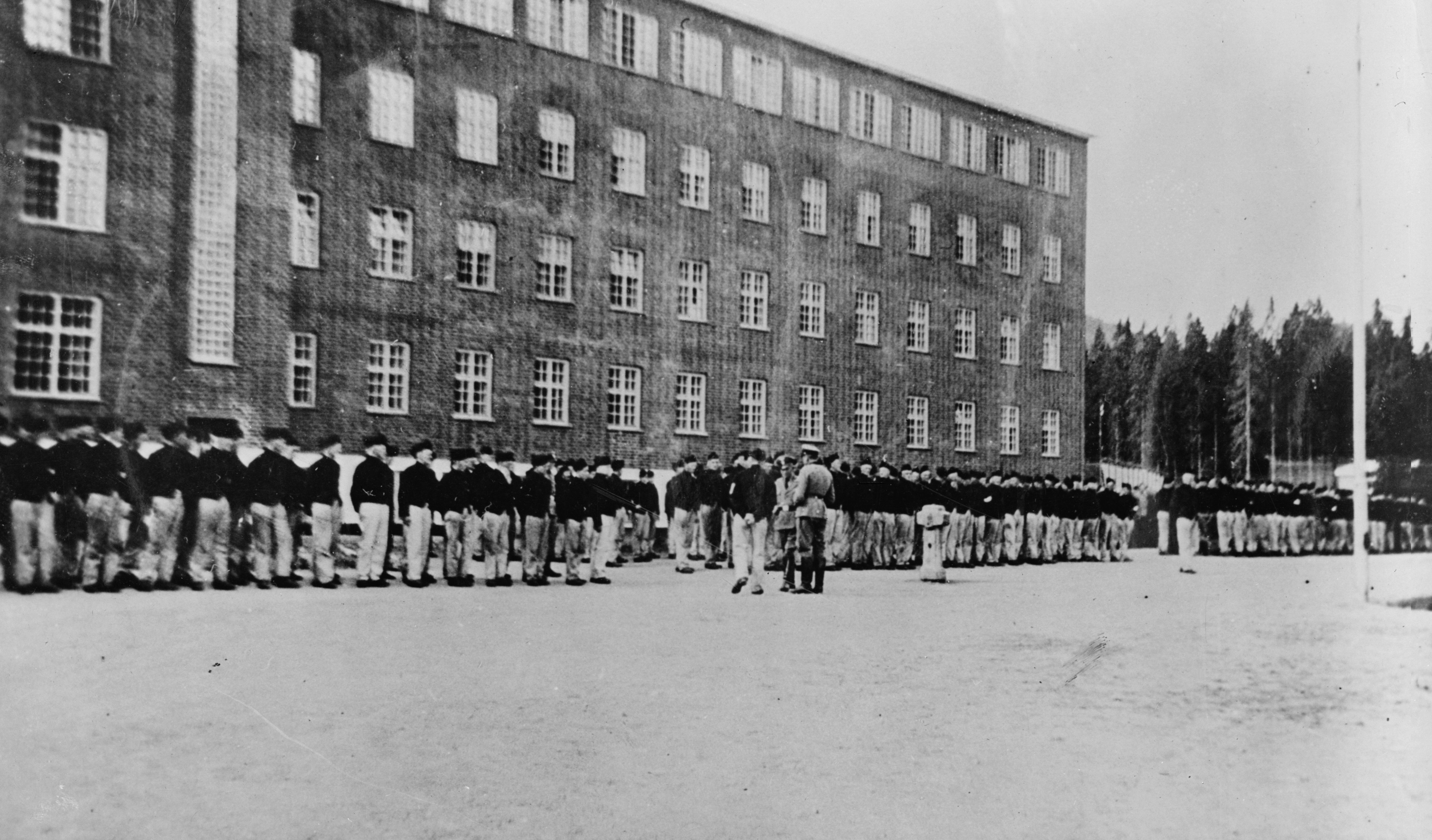
Grini detention camp, the first concentration camp that Leifur was imprisoned in

On 23 January 1943, Leifur was moved to Grini detention camp (Norwegian: Grini fangeleir, German: Polizeihäftlingslager Grini). (Note: Concentration camp ID number, Grini detention camp: 6041.)

== Sachsenhausen concentration camp ==
Leifur was transported from Grini on 28 June 1943 and taken to Aarhus in Denmark on board MS Monte Rosa, where he was then transported via train to the Sachsenhausen concentration camp, 35 km (22 mi) outside of Berlin. He was assigned the camp identification number 68138, designated as a political prisoner and made to wear a red inverted triangle badge.

Leifur met Óskar Vilhjálmsson, an Icelandic man who died in Sachsenhausen, the day before he died from pneumonia in March 1944.

In Sachsenhausen, he was assigned to remove gold dental fillings from the bodies of killed prisoners before they would be burned. (Note: This was omitted from both books, most likely due to shame.)

Leifur said about the camp brothel at Sachsenhausen that, at the time, he had thought that "the brothel was not a step down. But when ... [he looked back] he realised the humiliation that this involved."

== Rescue ==
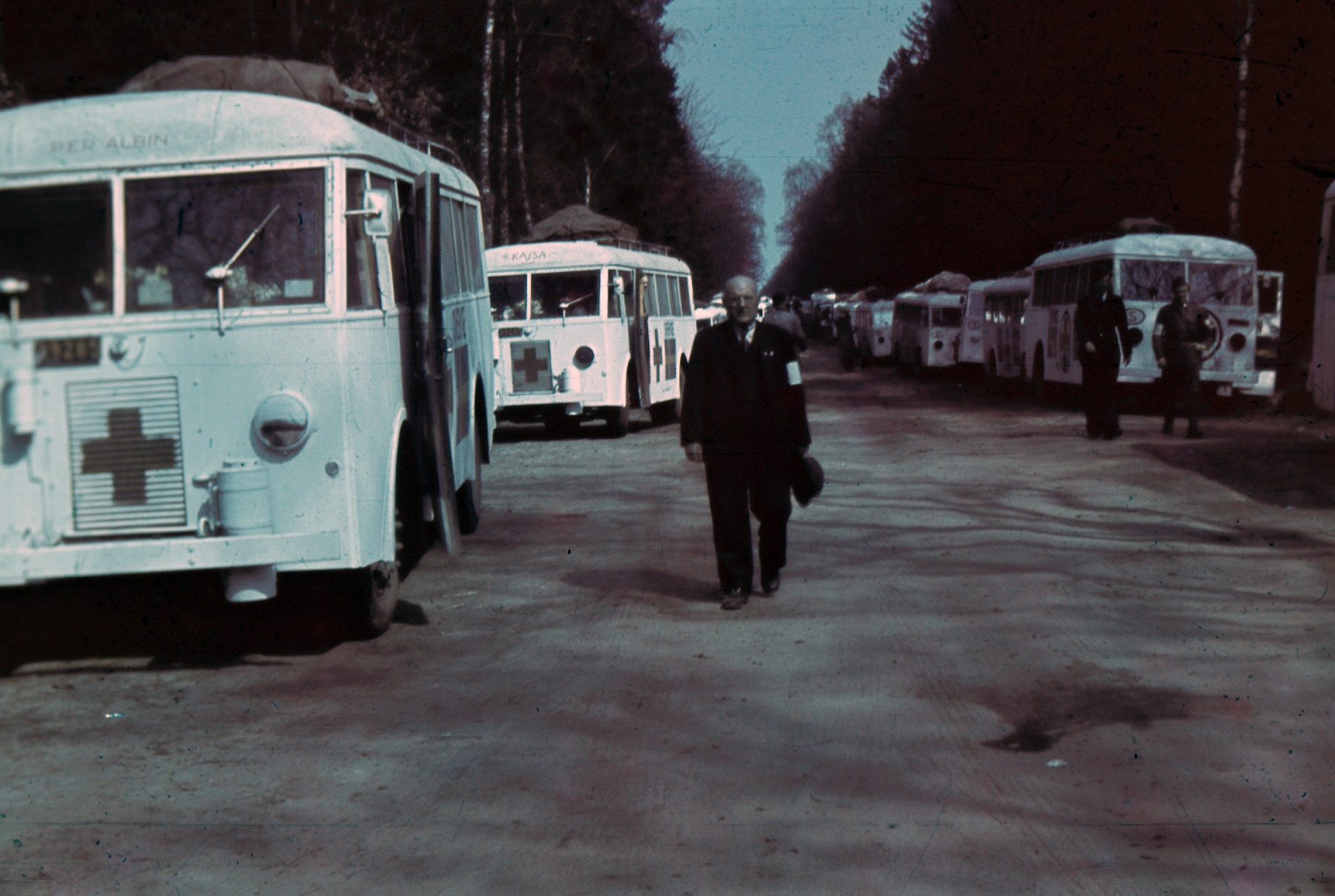
Swedish white buses gathered in their field headquarters at Friedrichsruh

Leifur was freed in the White Buses operation through Folke Bernadotte in March 1945, and spent about a month in the Neuengamme concentration camp (German: KZ Neuengamme) in northern Germany. From there the prisoners were transported to Sweden at the end of April 1945, with a stop at the Frøslev Prison Camp (Danish: Frøslevlejren, German: Polizeigefangenenlager Fröslee) in Denmark. On the way to Denmark, the bus convoy was attacked by an air raid.

On 24 June 1945, Leifur reached Oslo and flew home to Iceland on 7 July 1945.

== After the war ==
Leifur went to Norway to witness the trial of Egill Holmboe, (Note: Later changed his name to Egill Fálkason when becoming an Icelandic citizen, in 1955.) which found that Holmboe had not betrayed Leifur. Holmboe was found guilty of other crimes and served time in prison, before moving to Iceland and gaining citizenship.

Bjarni Benediktsson, then the Minister for Foreign Affairs (utanríkisráðherra), pressured the Norwegian government to extradiate Ólafur to Iceland, where he only served 72 days in prison before being released.

He once saw Ólafur Pétursson, the man who most likely betrayed him, but avoided meeting him or talking to him. Following pressure from the Icelandic government, Ólafur was sentenced to 20 years in prison in Norway but was released after three months. Today it is generally accepted that it was Ólafur who betrayed Leifur.

== Published works ==
- Leifur. H. Muller (2017) [first published 1945]. Í fangabúðum nazista [In the concentration camps of Nazis] (in Icelandic). Reykjavík: Víkingsútgáfan, Veröld. ISBN 978-9935-440-96-9. OCLC 952322829.

== See also ==
- List of Sachsenhausen prisoners
- List of Grini prisoners
