= Robert Hagelin =

Norwegian politician (1884–1960)

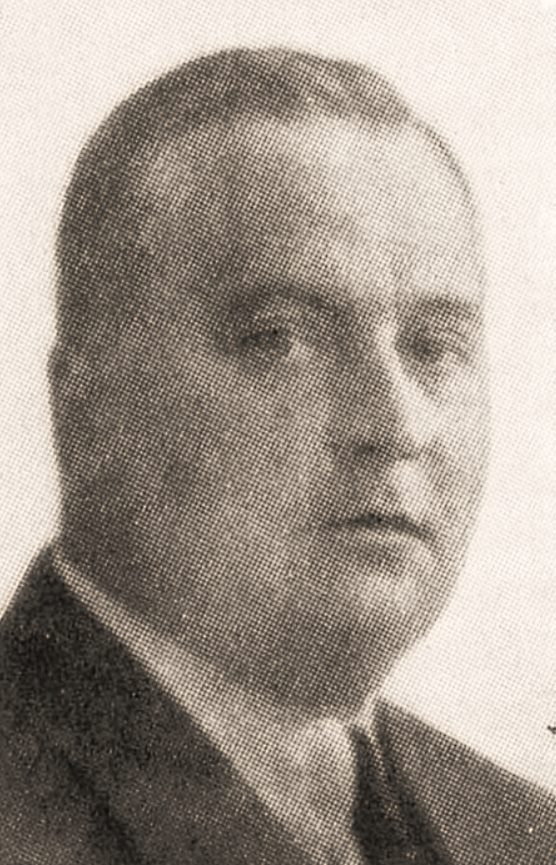
Robert Hagelin

Robert Hagelin (2 August 1884 – 5 January 1960) was a Norwegian politician for the Conservative Party.

Born in Bergen, he moved to Ålesund in 1915 to become the owner and manager of the factory Aalesunds Margarinfabrikk.

He was a member of Ålesund city council from 1925 to 1928, and served as a deputy representative to the Norwegian Parliament during the term 1931–1933, representing the Market towns of Møre og Romsdal county.

He was brother of Albert Viljam Hagelin, Minister of the Interior in the collaborationist Quisling regime. Like his brother, Robert Hagelin also joined Quisling's Nasjonal Samling party. Robert Hagelin was convicted of treason in the legal purge in Norway after World War II, and was sentenced to three years in prison.
