= List of prisoners of Sachsenhausen =

Nazi concentration camp prisoners

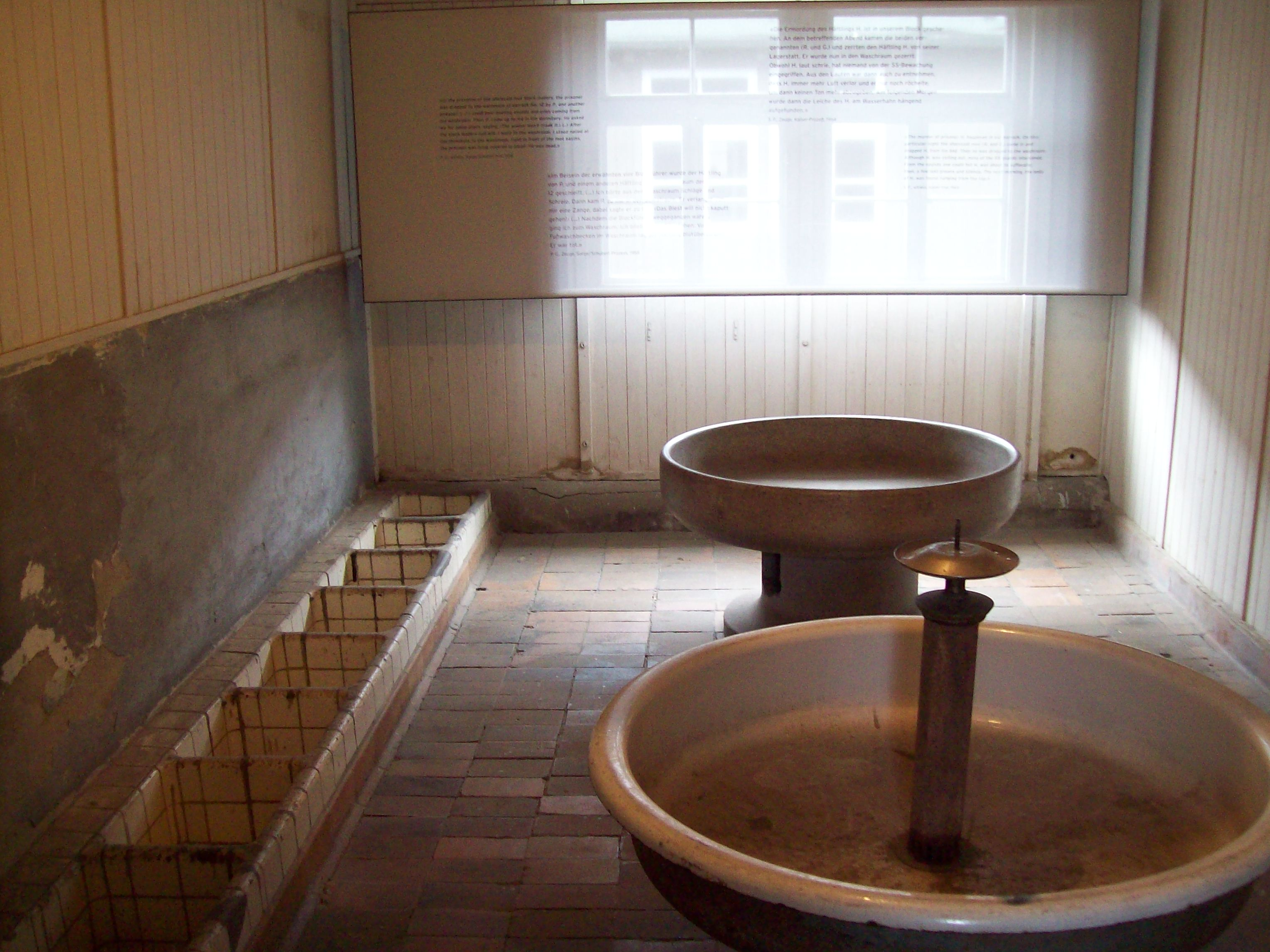
Wash up area for prisoners

This article is an incomplete list of people imprisoned at Sachsenhausen concentration camp.

== List of prisoners ==
- Tadeusz Banachiewicz, a Polish professor, astronomer, mathematician and geodesist. He was among 184 academics arrested on 6 November 1939, during Sonderaktion Krakau, professors, lecturers, doctors from Jagiellonian University (UJ), AGH University of Science and Technology, Kraków University of Economics (AE) and others.
- Captain Sigismund Payne Best and Major Richard Henry Stevens, British intelligence agents kidnapped during the Venlo Incident, detained at Sachsenhausen before transfer to Dachau concentration camp.
- Willem Frederik Karel Bischoff van Heemskerk, Dutch Resistance fighter.
- Trygve Bratteli of the Norwegian Labour Party, later prime minister of Norway
- Taras Bulba-Borovets, Andriy Melnyk and Oleh Stuhl (briefly), Stepan Bandera and Yaroslav Stetsko, Ukrainian nationalist leaders imprisoned until September–October 1944.
- Francisco Largo Caballero, Spanish Prime Minister (1937) and trade unionist, arrested in France, he spent most of World War II imprisoned at Sachsenhausen.
- Jack Churchill, placed at Sachsenhausen, later transferred to Tyrol.
- Johnny Jebsen, British double agent
- Peter Churchill, British SOE agent, later transferred to Tyrol.
- Leo Clasen, a homosexual survivor of the Holocaust who published an account of his ordeal in 1954 under the pseudonym L. D. Classen von Neudegg.
- Wing Commander Harry Day, Flight Lieutenants Bertram James and Sydney Dowse, RAF pilots, who had escaped during The Great Escape from Stalag Luft III, sent to Sachsenhausen as punishment, where with Jack Churchill and Major Johnnie Dodge escaped via a tunnel built by James and Dowse in September 1944. Recaptured and held in solitary confinement, later returned to the Sonderlager (special camp); transferred to Tyrol.
- Major Johnnie Dodge, a British Army Officer and relation of Winston Churchill who had escaped during The Great Escape from Stalag Luft III. In February 1945, was removed from solitary confinement and sent back to Britain, via Switzerland, to act as a peace envoy to the British Government, arriving just before VE Day.
- Heinrich Düker, political supporter of German resistance, survived
- Yakov Dzhugashvili, Joseph Stalin's eldest son, was briefly imprisoned and died there in 1943 under unclear circumstances.
- Georg Elser, opponent of Nazism who attempted to kill Adolf Hitler on his own in November 1939; later moved to Dachau concentration camp.
- Heinrich Feisthauer, political opponent of the Nazi regime and a survivor of Sachsenhausen.
- Karl Fischer, German communist politician.
- Einar Gerhardsen of the Norwegian Labour Party, later prime minister of Norway.
- Hans Grundig, German artist.

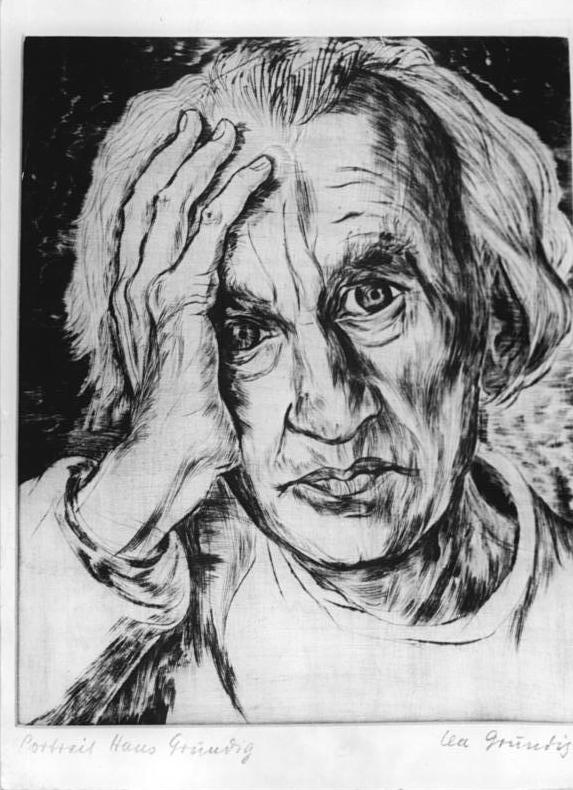
Portrait of Hans Grundig by Lea Grundig.

- Herschel Grynszpan, whose 7 November 1938 assassination of the German diplomat Ernst vom Rath served as a pretext for Kristallnacht, 1940 until he was moved to Magdeburg.
- Hans Hers, Dutch Resistance
- Bayume Mohamed Husen, a black man from Tanganyika (today Tanzania), died in the Sachsenhausen camp
- Dmitry Karbyshev, Red Army general and posthumous Hero of the Soviet Union briefly imprisoned before he was moved to Mauthausen concentration camp.
- Józef Klukowski, Olympic medal-winning Polish sculptor.
- Olaf Kullmann, Norwegian pacifist imprisoned April 1942 and perished there in July of the same year.
- Aksel Larsen, Danish Communist leader, imprisoned 1943 to 1945.
- Josef Lainck, deported in 1938 from Canada for criminal activity.
- Julius Leber, German SPD politician, 1933 until 1937, having been declared a "dangerous opponent of the regime".
- Arthur Löwenstamm, rabbi of Spandau Synagogue
- Georges Mandel, Minister of Overseas France, 1942–1943.
- Louis Mourot, French Resistance fighter.
- Leifur Muller, Icelandic student in Norway.
- Peter Lütsches, German politician and journalist.
- Henry Moskowitz, New York-based real estate investor and founder of a real estate company, The Argo Corporation
- Odd Nansen, Norwegian architect, author and humanitarian. Credited as co-founder of UNICEF and humanitarian efforts on behalf of Jews in the early years WWII. Released his camp diaries post war.
- Reverend Martin Niemöller, a critic of the Nazis and author of the statement "First they came ...".
- Oleh Olzhych, a Ukrainian poet tortured to death in June 1944.
- Arnulf Øverland, Norwegian anti-fascist poet.
- Paul Reynaud, the penultimate Prime Minister of France before its defeat by Germany, 1942–1943.
- Jules Charles Emil Riotte, Lutheran pastor, Sorbian activist, evacuated to England after D-Day, returned to Roman Catholic Church and became Ukrainian Catholic priest, entomologist
- Stefan Rowecki, chief commander of the Polish Armia Krajowa, imprisoned 1943 and probably executed there in 1944.
- Karl Schirdewan, German communist functionary.
- Kurt Schuschnigg, the penultimate Chancellor of Austria before the Anschluss.
- Fritz Thyssen, German businessman who emigrated from Germany, imprisoned in Sachsenhausen and later transferred to Dachau.
- Madeleine Truel, Peruvian writer. Author of "The Boy of the Subway". Member of the French Resistance.
- Gottfried Graf von Bismarck-Schönhausen, grandson of Otto von Bismarck, an SS officer aware of the preparations for the 20 July plot to assassinate Hitler, was imprisoned in Sachsenhausen until its liberation by Soviet forces.
- Hasso von Boehmer, German Lieutenant Colonel on the General Staff and 20 July plotter, temporarily detained in the camp's clinic in 1944 due to illness. He was then moved to Berlin.
- Hans von Dohnányi, a German jurist, rescuer of Jews, and resistance fighter against the Nazi German regime, 1944 until his execution in April 1945.
- Prežihov Voranc, Slovene writer and communist imprisoned in January 1943 until the end of the War.
- Leon Wachholz, Polish scientist and medical examiner
- Hugo Wenzel, German communist politician.
- The wife and children of Rupprecht, Crown Prince of Bavaria, members of the Wittelsbach family, October 1944 to April 1945, before being transferred to Dachau concentration camp.
- Reinhold Wulle, monarchist and former German National People's Party leader.
- Antonín Zápotocký, General Secretary of the Communist Party of Czechoslovakia (later Prime Minister and President), from 1940. He became a Kapo, which ultimately helped him survive the war.
- Jozef (Joop) van Elsen (Rotterdam, March 22, 1916 - Oegstgeest, January 8, 2006) was a Dutch Army general, politician and Resistance fighter.
- Horia Sima, second leader of the Iron Guard, detained from 1943 to 1944
- Jens Mungard, Frisian writer

== Prisoners executed at "Station Z" ==
- Commandos from Operation Musketoon.
- August Dickmann, a German Jehovah's Witness publicly shot on 15 September 1939 for conscientious objection to joining the armed forces.
- John Godwin (Royal Navy officer), a British Naval Sub-Lieutenant who managed to shoot dead the commander of his execution party, for which he was posthumously mentioned in despatches.
- William Grover-Williams, Grand Prix motor racing champion.
- Franz Kaufmann, German jurist, former Chief Secretary of the Reich Public Accounts Office and head of an underground group that supplied counterfeit documents to underground Jews, including certificates of Aryan descent, driving licenses, and food ration cards. Arrested in 1943 and executed in 1944.
- Heinrich Koenen, an NKVD spy captured in Berlin, executed in 1945.
- Willi Lehmann, NKVD spy, probably cremated December 1942.
- Friedrich Weißler, German lawyer active in the resistance movement against National Socialism.
- Albert Willimsky, German Roman Catholic priest active in the resistance movement against National Socialism.
- Tadeusz Witkowski
- Stanisław Kubista, Polish SVD Priest.
