= Trygve Vrenne =

Norwegian teacher and writer

Trygve Daniel Vrenne (13 September 1887 – 1963) was a Norwegian teacher and writer.

He was born in Berg i Østfold. When he was still young, his family moved to Åmli Municipality where his father served as bailiff. Vrenne finished his secondary education in Arendal in 1906. He held short-term jobs as a teacher in Åmli, Lillesand, Sandnes and Notodden, and did secretarial work at the Parliament of Norway. From 1914 to 1915 he was the editor-in-chief of the newspaper Rjukan. He also travelled somewhat extensively, and tried his hand at writing. In 1919 he issued a short biography on August Oddvar, and in 1925 he published the poetry collection Betroelser on Gyldendal in Denmark. He wrote about his travels in Aftenposten, Tidens Tegn, Morgenbladet and Nationen.

In 1919 Vrenne graduated with the cand.philol. degree from the University of Oslo. His master's thesis in English was named Menneskeskildringen hos George Eliot, studying descriptions of people in George Eliot's writings. He subsequently worked as a teacher at the upper secondary schools in Ringerike from 1920, Larvik from 1922 and then at Bergen Cathedral School from 1929.

During the German occupation of Norway, Vrenne joined the collaborationist party Nasjonal Samling. He was selected by the Ministry of Culture and Enlightenment as a board member of Bergen's theatre, Den Nationale Scene. He was tasked with political censorship at Den Nationale Scene, but was not "particularly aggressive". According to the historians of Den Nationale Scene, Vrenne was an opportunist member of NS rather than an ideological supporter. In 1943 he wrote in Ragnarok, stating that Great Britain only helped its allies "to maintain its global hegemony", and that the United States sought the same kind of world domination. Vrenne concluded: "All good and strong forces in our part of the world must now stand united and faithful to protect our dear, eternally valuable and value-creating Europe against the grand perils of doom that have ventured ever so close to us. From the east - and from the west". In 1943 he issued his second poetry collection, Veien mot havet, on the publishing house Norden. For his membership in Nasjonal Samling and Norges Lærersamband, he was relieved of his membership in the teachers' union Norsk Lektorlag after the war ended.

After the war he issued a collection of travelogues, Fra Oslo til Messina. In a short book review for Adresseavisen, Ruth Alvsen praised the book as "deserving to be read". The sketches from travels in Italy were fresh and fun, giving the reader both "considerable valuable knowledge about the sunny land of the sagas" and "unadultered joy". Alvsen did not always "agree with the writer's private reflections", though. According to Tønsbergs Blad, Vrenne's book was a "good [travel] guide", and "had its mission" regardless of whether the reader had visited Italy several times or not at all. The reader would "draw advantage from his widespread knowledge and of his several anecdotes and small tales".

Vrenne was married to painter Lilla Hellesen. They resided in Oslo after the war. He died in 1963, aged 76.
