= Øst-Trøndelag =

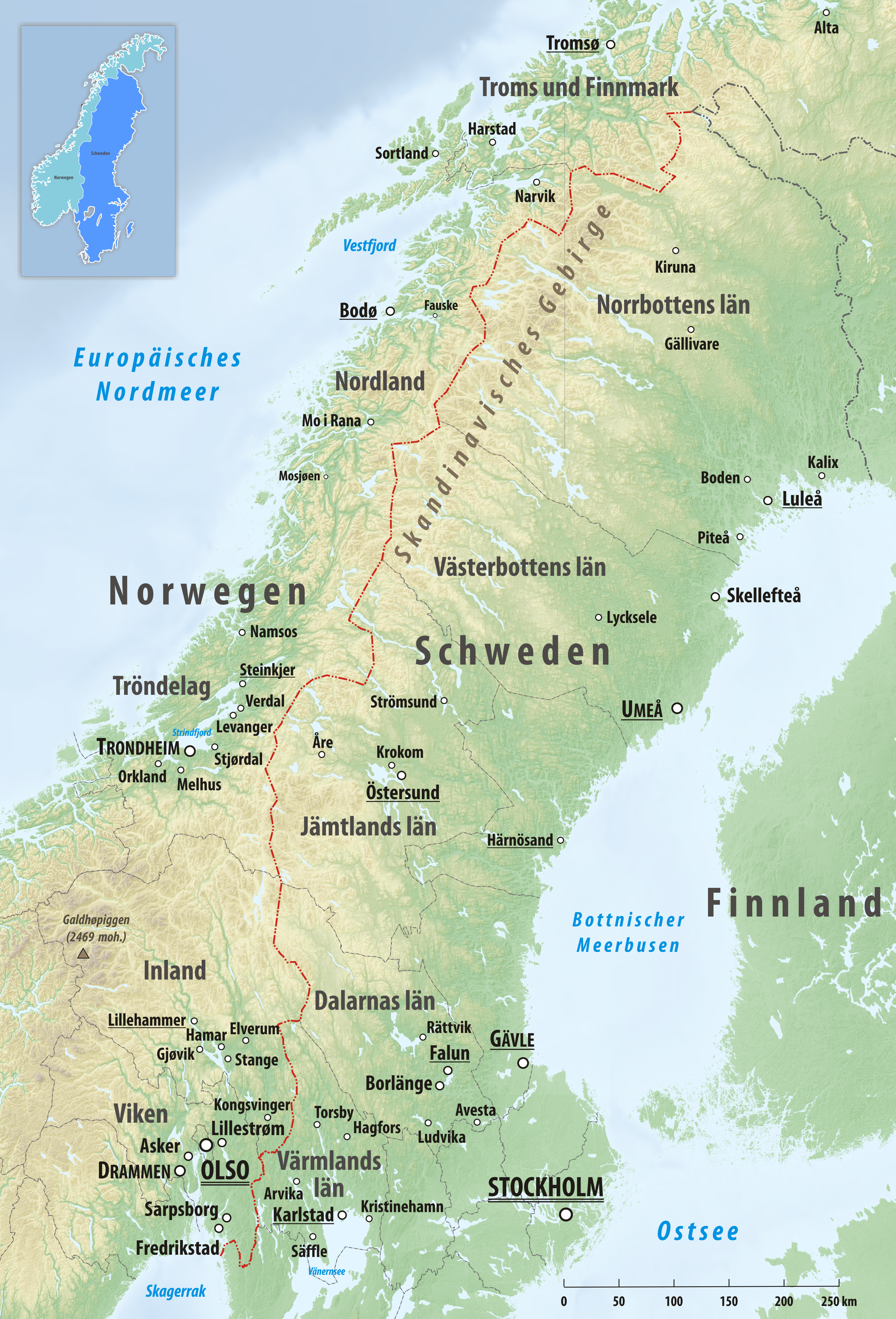
Norway–Sweden border areas

Øst-Trøndelag (Urban East Norwegian: [ˈœ̂stˌtrœndəlɑːɡ], Norwegian name; Swedish: Östtröndelag or Öst-Tröndelag, pronounced [ˈœ̂sːtˌtrœnːdɛlɑːɡ]; English: East Trøndelag) or Aust-Trøndelag is an unofficial and polemic name for the Swedish regions Jämtland and Härjedalen which until 1645 belonged to Norway. As the name suggests, the region lies to the east of the Norwegian region of Trøndelag.

The toponym is a neologism with no historic merit, since all of historic Trøndelag was returned to Norway in 1660 following a brief occupation by Sweden — unlike Bohuslän, Idre & Serna (formerly part of Østerdalen), Herjedalen and Jemtland, all of which were annexed and have been part of Sweden for three centuries.

In the 1940s, during the German occupation of Norway, some Norwegian politicians called for the annexation of Øst-Trøndelag to provide the collaborationist Quisling regime new opportunities for expansion.

In 2004, Norwegian students humorously erected road signs on the border indicating that travelers were entering the Norwegian county of Øst-Trøndelag.
