= Sigurd Lunde =

Sigurd Lunde may refer to:

- Sigurd Lunde (architect) (1874–1936), Norwegian architect
- Sigurd Lunde (bishop) (1916–2006), Norwegian bishop
