= Anders Beggerud =

Norwegian civil servant (1894–1957)

Anders Beggerud (22 June 1894 in Sandsvær – 22 June 1957) was a Norwegian civil servant during the Nazi regime.

He hailed from Kongsberg, and was a crafts teacher by profession. He was a member of Nasjonal Samling. From 1940 to 1945, during the occupation of Norway by Nazi Germany, Beggerud served as director of the Norwegian Press Directorate, a subdivision of the Ministry of Culture and Enlightenment. He was sentenced to eight years of forced labor as a part of the legal purge in Norway after World War II.
