= Arnvid Vasbotten =

Norwegian jurist and politician (1903–1985)

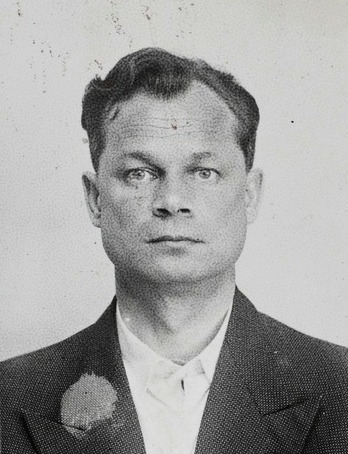
- Vasbotten in July 1945

Minister of the Interior (National Government)
- In office 8 November 1944 – 8 May 1945
- Reichskommissar: Josef Terboven
- Minister President: Vidkun Quisling
- Preceded by: Albert Viljam Hagelin
- Succeeded by: Office abolished

Personal details
- Born: Arnvid Birger Liljedal Vasbotten; 11 August 1903 Florø, Sogn og Fjordane, Sweden–Norway
- Died: 17 May 1985 (aged 81) Oslo, Norway
- Party: Nasjonal Samling
- Occupation: Jurist, politician

Military service
- Allegiance: Nazi Germany
- Branch/service: Schutzstaffel
- Years of service: 1942–1945
- Rank: Untersturmführer
- Unit: Germanske SS Norge
- Battles/wars: World War II

Arnvid Birger Liljedal Vasbotten (11 August 1903 – 17 May 1985) was a Norwegian jurist and politician. A member of Nasjonal Samling, he was Minister of the Interior in the collaborationist government of Vidkun Quisling in occupied Norway between 1944 and 1945.

== Biography ==
Born in Florø, Vasbotten received his cand. jur. degree in 1926. Having joined Nasjonal Samling in December 1940, he was employed as a department head in the Ministry of Justice after the German occupation during World War II, and was appointed a judge in the Supreme Court in 1941. During the German occupation Vasbotten wrote numerous legal considerations and articles that attempted to legitimize the Quisling regime, and was instrumental in the work to create a legal basis for the so-called "State Act" of February 1942, by which Quisling was appointed Minister President. Vasbotten replaced Albert Viljam Hagelin as Minister of the Interior under Quisling in November 1944, after the latter was forced to resign.

An ideologically convinced Nazi, Vasbotten joined the Germanic SS Norway as a volunteer in late 1942, where he reached the rank of Untersturmführer. Remaining loyal to Quisling until the German capitulation in May 1945, Vasbotten was sentenced to twenty years of forced labour in the legal purge in Norway after World War II. After serving his sentence he was given a position as consultant for the Ministry of Justice, and among other things worked on the publication of Norges lover, the Norwegian code of law.

Vasbotten died in Oslo on 17 May 1985, at the age of 81.
