= Denofa =

Norwegian industrial company

Denofa AS
- Industry: Manufacturing
- Founded: 1912
- Headquarters: Fredrikstad, Norway
- Key people: Hans Petter Olsen (CEO)
- Revenue: NOK 2.5 billion (2022)
- Number of employees: 75
- Parent: Amaggi (100%)
- Website: www.denofa.no

Denofa AS, established in 1912 as De Nordiske Fabriker A/S (De-No-Fa for short), is a Norwegian industrial company. It has produced oil, proteins and fatty acid (lecithin) for the food processing industry, the fodder industry and the pharmaceutical industry. Starting with whale oil as a basis for refinement, the use of soy later became more widespread.

The company was established on 10 May 1912. The first board consisted of P. Bogen, Joh. Gmeiner, Hugo Wetlesen, Carl Dietrich Hildisch, Helge Offerdahl and Wilhelm Nicolaysen. The first production facility was located in Fredrikstad, planned and constructed by Carl Fredrik Holmboe. In 1923 Holmboe became chief executive officer. De-No-Fa launched a cooperation with the soap company Lilleborg in 1925, and eventually acquired it as a daughter company. Later, a 50% stake in the company was bought by Unilever (formerly Lever Brothers), where Carl Fredrik Holmboe was chief engineer prior to his period in De-No-Fa. Holmboe left the CEO position in 1946.

In 1959 Unilever's stake was bought by Borregaard. In 1960 De-No-Fa and Lilleborg was merged to form DeNoFa Lilleborg. The company owned Stabburet from 1969 to 1985. The year after that, Borregaard was acquired by the Orkla Group. Lilleborg was demerged in 1996 to again form a separate company, but remained a part of the Orkla Group. In 2005, 40% of Denofa was bought by Unikorn. Orkla now owns 20%, while the remaining 40% are owned by the Brazilian company Inlogs. In addition, Denofa owns 60% of the Polish company Nagrol. Denofa has also been active in Russia, and opened a sales office in Romania in 1996.

In addition to Fredrikstad, Denofa also owned a production facility in Leknes, acquired after buying 100% of the company Marine Lipids. In 2004 it was decided to close the fat refinery in Fredrikstad. At that time the plant employed 120 people, already downsized from 450 over a fifteen-year period. The extraction plant (nicknamed X-verket) with 70 employees, located adjacent to the fat refinery, was also threatened with closing. However, it was retained following the influx of fresh capital from Unikorn. The changes marked a stronger leaning towards soy. The soybeans are imported from Brazil; in addition grain from Norway is used.

The company currently has 75 employees, and the current CEO is Hans Petter Olsen
