= Norwegian Press Directorate =

The Norwegian Press Directorate (Norwegian: Pressedirektoratet) was a Norwegian government agency within the Ministry of Culture and Enlightenment between 1940 and 1945. Anders Beggerud was the director during the entire Second World War.
