= Alf Whist =

Norwegian politician and businessman

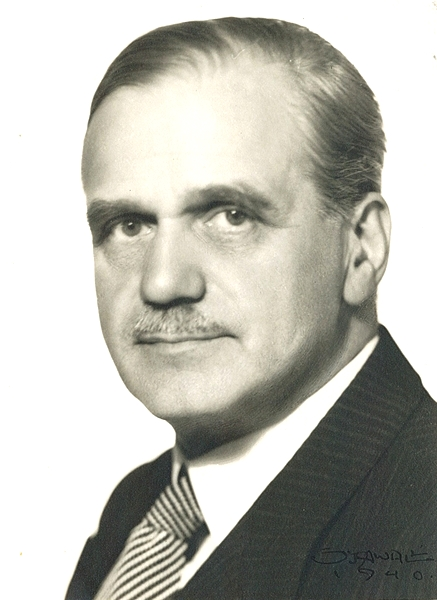
- Whist in c. 1940
- Born: August 6, 1880; Fredrikshald, Norway
- Died: July 16, 1962 (aged 81); Oslo, Norway
- Political party: Nasjonal Samling (1940–1945)
- Parent(s): Svend Larsen; Sofie Mathilde Laumann

Alf Larsen Whist (6 August 1880 – 16 July 1962) was a Norwegian businessman and Nasjonal Samling politician who collaborated with Nazi Germany during World War II.

== Pre-war life and career ==
He was born in Fredrikshald as a son of Svend Larsen (1833–1893) and Sofie Mathilde Laumann (1842–1897). He finished middle school in 1896, and after a period at sea he started working with insurance in Kristiania. He was married to editor's daughter Augusta Kathinka Hals from 1904.

He started his own insurance company Norske Lloyd in 1905, and also founded insurance companies like Norske Alliance, Norske Forenende Livsforsikringsselskap, Globus and Andvake. Norske Lloyd went bankrupt in 1920–1921. He then moved from Ullern to France. He was a board member of insurance companies in Finland, France, Algeria and the United States.

He was decorated as an Officier of the Legion of Honour, Officer of the Order of the British Empire, Commander of the Order of Leopold and Knight of the Order of the White Rose of Finland. However, in France he was sentenced for economic crimes in 1935 (the sentence was overturned in 1942 under Nazi control). Some time after the sentence he returned to Norway, now running the company Alf L. Whist & Co. This company made a profit which he invested in real estate. One of his sons was given control over the company Heggedal Bruk, which constructed readymade cabins.

== World War II ==
Following the occupation of Norway by Nazi Germany which started on 9 April 1940, Whist made himself a new career as a profiteer. Despite having no political experience, he now joined the only legal political party in the country, the Fascist party Nasjonal Samling (NS), in the summer of 1940, and was soon installed in the board of directors of Vinmonopolet (as chairman) and Norges Brannkasse. His companies also received substantial orders from Organisation Todt.

On 8 November 1941 he was proclaimed as the NS Ombudsman for Enterprise (Norwegian: NS Ombudsmann for næringslivet). This was a new office, whose establishment had been suggested by Whist himself. Its purpose was in part to establish a network of NS sympathizers in the Norwegian business life and to recruit businesspeople to the party, but the mandate was vague. Whist used it as a vehicle to further his own interests, but also to strengthen national socialist economic ideas within business.

He was behind the merger of several employers' associations to found Norges Næringssamband on 1 May 1943, where he also became president. Vice president was Whist's close supporter Carl Dietrich Hildisch. As chairman of the organization, Lars Hasvold was installed, a former secretary-general who had been in contact with Whist since the autumn of 1941. Norges Næringssamband was also used as a personal vehicle for political power, as well as an organization to outline technological visions for a future Fascist Norway. On 4 November 1943 Whist's power platform became even larger, as he was named in Quisling's Second Cabinet as a minister without portfolio, responsible for the coordination of provisions and industrial war efforts. In January 1944 he was allowed to accompany Vidkun Quisling on his visit to Adolf Hitler. He unsuccessfully tried to become Minister of Finance, but on 12 June 1944 he took over for Eivind Blehr as Minister of Industry and Shipping. Blehr was pressured out of government because he was too Norwegian-nationalist, whereas Whist was more German-friendly.

== Post-war career ==
The German occupation ended on 8 May 1945, and Whist promptly lost his jobs. As a part of the legal purge in Norway after World War II, in 1946 he was sentenced to forced labour for life as well as 3 million kr in repairs. A minority of two judges voted to impose the death penalty. He was pardoned in 1952, and died in 1962.
