= Thorstein Fretheim =

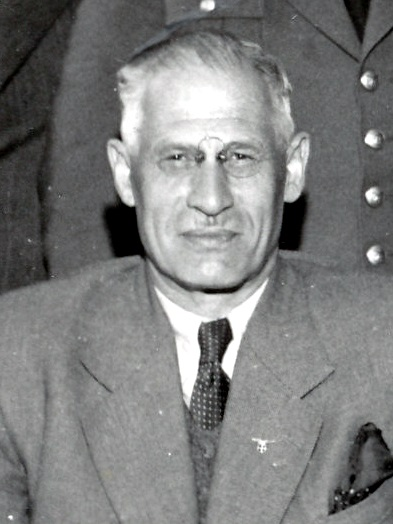
Thorstein Fretheim sometime during the Second World War

Thorstein John Ohnstad Fretheim (10 May 1886 – 29 June 1971) was a Norwegian acting councillor of state in the NS government of Vidkun Quisling 1940–1941, and minister 1941–1945. Fretheim was a district veterinary by profession. In the post-war legal purges he was convicted of treason and sentenced to 20 years of forced labour, being pardoned in 1951.
