= Rolf Jørgen Fuglesang =

Norwegian politician (1909–1988)

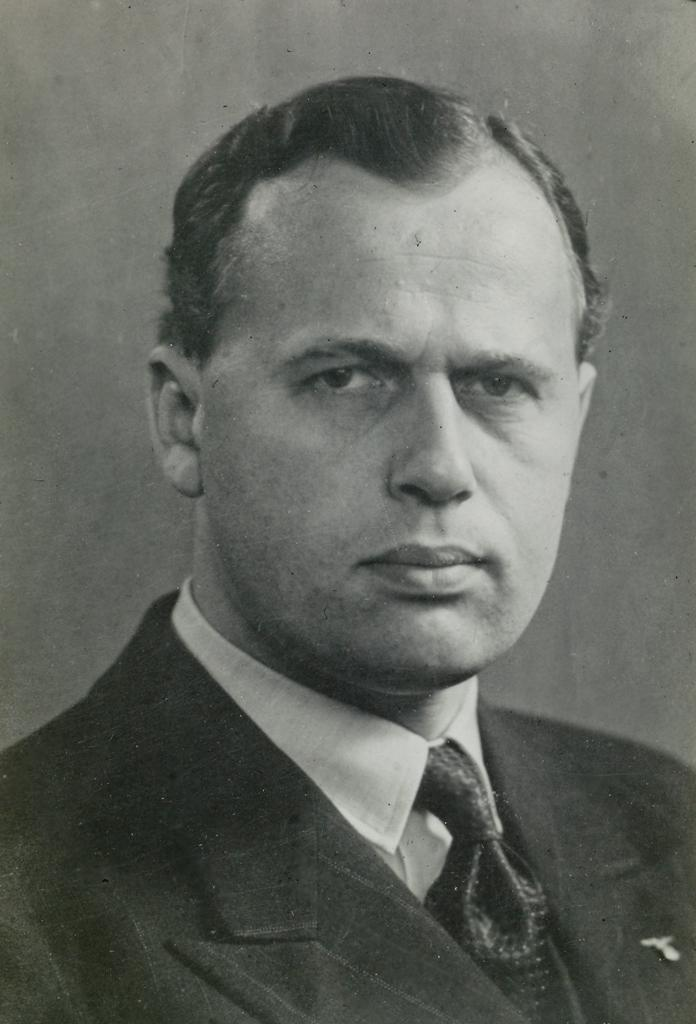
- Fuglesang in 1940

Minister of Culture and Enlightenment (National Government)
- In office 25 October 1942 – 8 May 1945
- Reichskommissar: Josef Terboven
- Minister President: Vidkun Quisling
- Preceded by: Gulbrand Lunde
- Succeeded by: Office abolished

Personal details
- Born: January 31, 1909 Fredrikstad, Østfold, Sweden–Norway
- Died: November 25, 1988 (aged 79) Oslo, Norway
- Party: Nasjonal Samling
- Occupation: Lawyer, politician

Rolf Jørgen Fuglesang (31 January 1909 – 25 November 1988) was a Norwegian lawyer and politician. A member of Nasjonal Samling, he was the party's Secretary-General from 1933. During the German occupation of Norway in World War II, he served in the government of Vidkun Quisling as a secretary of state from 1940, and then as Minister of Culture and Enlightenment from 1942 until liberation in 1945. He was also President of the Kulturting between 1943 and 1945.

== Biography ==
=== Early life and political career ===
Born in Fredrikstad, Fuglesang received a degree in law in 1933. An early follower of Vidkun Quisling, he joined Nasjonal Samling the same year, and was soon employed as the party's Secretary-General; in this capacity, he was in charge of the economical and organizational affairs of Nasjonal Samling during the party's growth in membership in 1933–1934, and subsequent decline following the 1936 elections.

=== German occupation ===
Despite being one of the men closest to Quisling, he was uninformed of the German invasion of Norway and Quisling's coup d'état on 9 April 1940. Nasjonal Samling would remain the sole legal party in the country during the German occupation, leading to a rapid increase in party membership and administration strictly overseen by Fuglesang.

Despite being described as "moderate" during the initial stages of the occupation, Fuglesang would subsequently become a leading proponent of pan-German and racial ideas, earning him a positive reputation with Heinrich Himmler. In February 1942 he joined Quisling's government as a secretary of state; following the death of Gulbrand Lunde in October 1942, he succeeded the latter as Minister of Culture and Enlightenment. As a government member, Fuglesang tried to safeguard the government's relative autonomy in practical and administrative matters from the German occupational forces, causing him to frequently clash with Reichskommissar Josef Terboven.

In January 1944, he accompanied Vidkun Quisling for his visit to Adolf Hitler and also had a longer, mainly conciliatory, conversation with Himmler in Rastenburg. Towards the end of the war, however, the Germans viewed him as one of their main opponents within the leadership of Nasjonal Samling.

=== Post-war ===
After the liberation of Norway, Fuglesang was arrested and put on trial for treason in February 1946. He was sentenced to life imprisonment with forced labour for treason. He narrowly avoided execution, as four out of seven judges voted for a life sentence. Fuglesang was released from prison in 1956, and worked as a bricklayer and businessman in Oslo until his retirement. Being ostracized by the Norwegian community for what was deemed as severe acts of treason, he died in Oslo in 1988.

== Personal life ==
Fuglesang married Signe Horn (1910–1989) in 1935. They had a daughter, Signe Horn Fuglesang (born 1938), an art historian who was married to fellow art historian Per Jonas Nordhagen; the marriage ended in divorce.

== See also ==
- The Norwegian Ministry of Culture and Enlightenment
