= Lars Hasvold =

Norwegian organizational director

Øistein Lars Hasvold (1908 – 1964) was a Norwegian organizational director.

He was a member of Fedrelandslaget in the 1930s, and was its secretary-general from 1938 to the disestablishment in 1940. The disestablishment followed the German occupation of Norway, and in January 1942 Hasvold joined the only legal party in the country, the Fascist party Nasjonal Samling (NS). Already from the autumn of 1941 he had been a close contact of NS politician Alf Whist. Hasvold was instated as director of Norges Handelsforbund on 1 January 1943, then of Norges Næringssamband on 1 May 1943. Norges Næringssamband was an employers' association in which Whist was co-founder and president. Whist and Hasvold used it as a vehicle for political power, but also to outline technological visions for a future Fascist Norway.

The German occupation ended on 8 May 1945, and Hasvold promptly lost his job. As a part of the legal purge in Norway after World War II, in 1948 he was sentenced to four years of forced labour. He died in 1964.
