= Thorleif Dahl (jurist) =

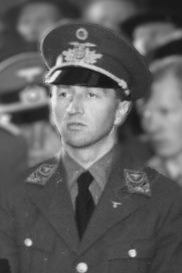
- Thorleif Dahl (1942)
- Born: 29 October 1907
- Died: 9 February 1997
- Political party: Nasjonal Samling

Thorleif Dahl (29 October 1907 – 9 February 1997) was a Norwegian jurist who served as a civil servant representing Nasjonal Samling during the Second World War.

He was born in Skien, was married and had six children. He finished his secondary education in 1926 and took the cand.jur. degree.

He worked as an attorney in his hometown until 1940, when he was hired as permanent under-secretary of state in the Ministry of the Interior. This was during the occupation of Norway by Nazi Germany, and he had joined the Fascist party Nasjonal Samling in 1938. Dahl is regarded by historians as a knowledgeable and practical civil servant with "judicial finesse". As the German occupants came to mistrust the Minister of Interior, Albert Viljam Hagelin, Dahl rose from 1942–43 to serve almost as the "acting Minister of the Interior". After the war, he was convicted for treason and sentenced to five years of forced labour.

He settled in Gjerpen Municipality. He died in 1997, almost 90 years old.
