= Lilla Hellesen =

Norwegian painter

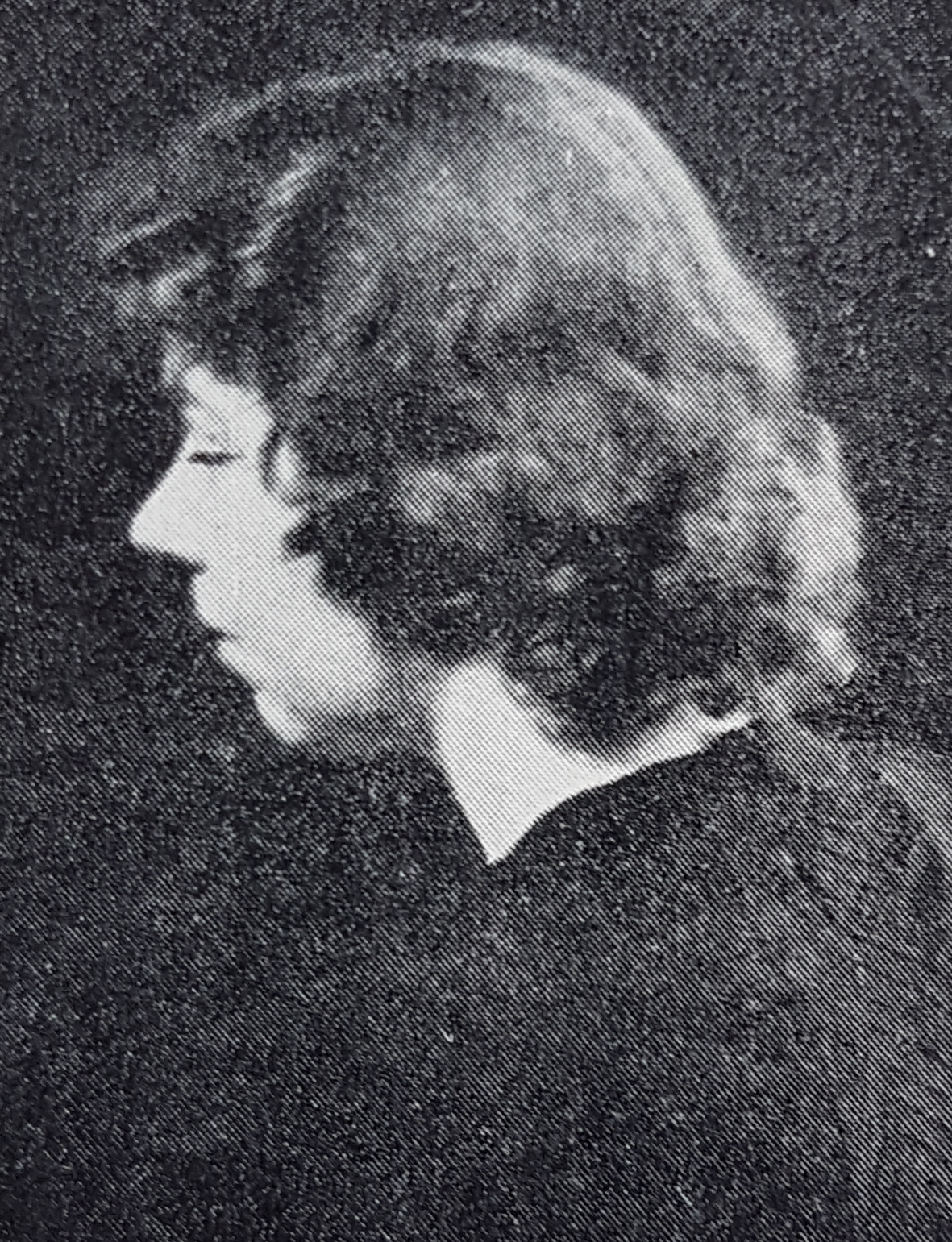
- Born: 13 October 1902; Kristiania, Norway
- Died: 28 October 1963 (aged 61); Oslo, Norway
- Occupation: Painter

Lilla Hellesen (13 October 1902 – 28 October 1963) was a Norwegian painter.

== Biography ==
She was born in Kristiania as the daughter of the doctor Engel Emil Herman Hellesen and actress Marie Mejlænder. Hellesen studied at the Norwegian National Academy of Craft and Art Industry 1921–22 and the Norwegian National Academy of Fine Arts in Oslo 1922–25. She participated in the Autumn Exhibition numerous times between 1924 and 1962. She made her her debut at the Salon (Paris) in 1927. She exhibited at the Clerie de la Toison d'Or in Brussels, at Les femmes artistes d'Europe in Paris in 1937, and at the Riverside Museum in New York City in 1940, as well as at Victoria and Albert Museum in London in 1938.

Her work was part of the painting event in the art competition at the 1948 Summer Olympics. Her work is represented at the National Museum of Art, Architecture and Design in Oslo, the British Museum, the Bibliothèque nationale de France and the National Gallery of Denmark in Copenhagen.

She was a board member of Norske Grafikeres Forening. She was married to teacher and writer Trygve Vrenne.
