= Carl Dietrich Hildisch =

Norwegian businessman

Carl Dietrich Hildisch (22 April 1867 – 16 September 1949) was a Norwegian businessperson and politician for Nasjonal Samling.

== Biography ==
He was born in Norway to German parents. He co-founded of the company De-No-Fa in 1912, and was elected to the first board of directors. He joined the Fascist party Nasjonal Samling in 1933, but was not an active member until the occupation of Norway by Nazi Germany from 1940.

In May 1940, he acted as an informer for the Sicherheitspolizei about local businesspeople. Later in 1940, Hildisch was installed by Reichskommissar Josef Terboven as manager of De-No-Fa. In February 1943 he was installed as president of the Federation of Norwegian Industries, as the pre-war leadership was ousted. On 1 May 1943 he was declared vice president of the new organisation Norges Næringssamband. He was a close supporter of the president there, Alf Whist.

The German occupation ended on 8 May 1945, and Hildisch lost all his positions. He escaped conviction during the legal purge in Norway after World War II because of his high age (78 at the war's end). He died in 1949.
