= Hans Skarphagen =

Norwegian politician and engineer (1888–1971)

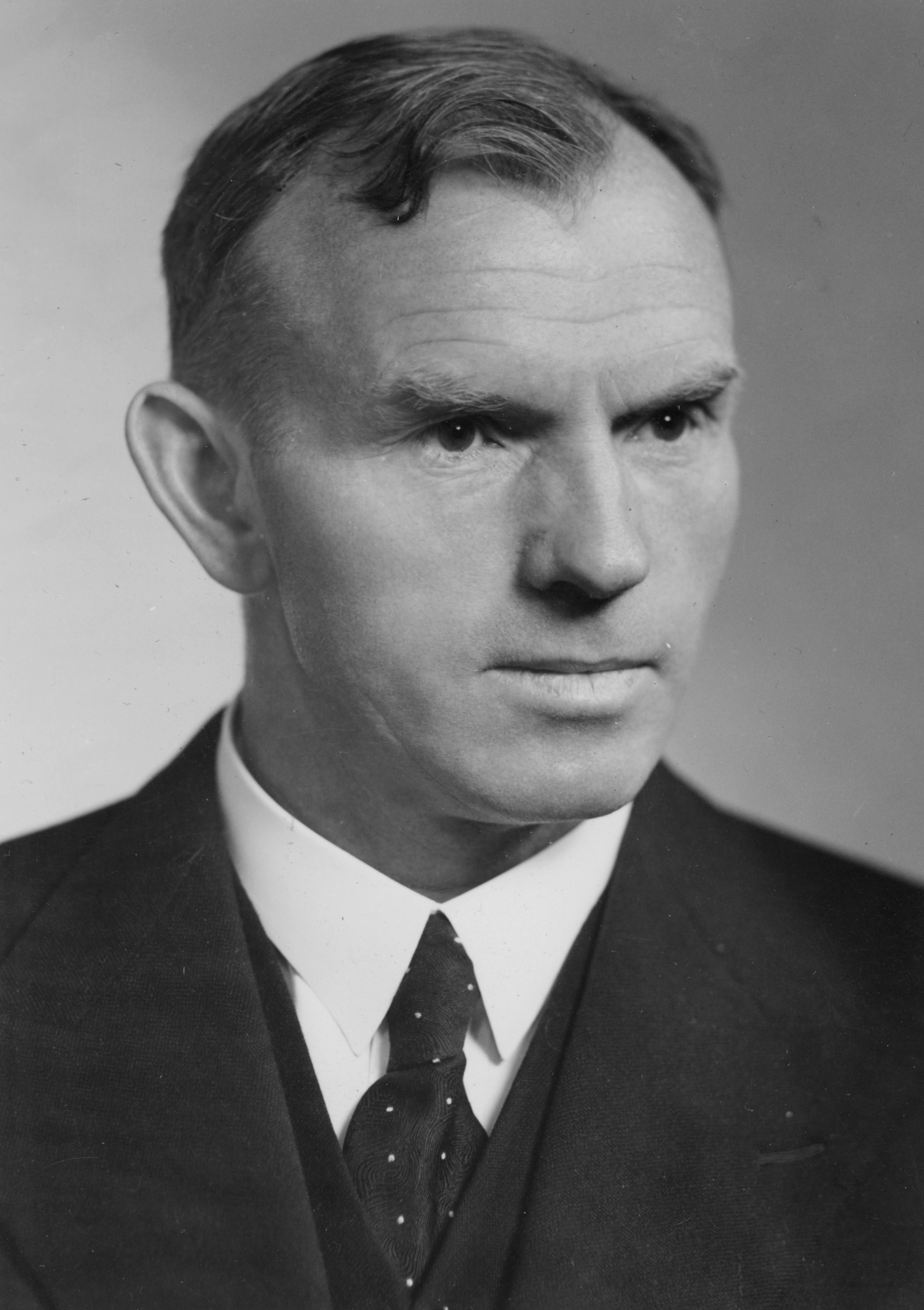
- Born: 8 September 1888; Larvik, United Kingdoms of Sweden and Norway
- Died: 10 February 1971 (aged 82); Bærum, Norway
- Occupations: NS politician professor engineer
- Status: Deceased
- Conviction: Treason
- Penalty: 20 years imprisonment with hard labor

Hans Hansen Skarphagen (né Hans Hansen; 8 September 1888 – 10 February 1971) was a Norwegian engineer and NS politician. He was a professor at the Norwegian Institute of Technology. In 1944 he replaced Tormod Hustad as minister of labour in the NS government. He also held the positions of Commissioner-General of NRK and as Director General of the Norwegian Water Resources and Energy Directorate during the German occupation of Norway.

In the post-war legal purges he was convicted of treason and sentenced to 20 years of forced labour. He had formerly fielded in the 1933 Norwegian parliamentary election in Akershus but his party did not win a seat.
