= Sigurd Lunde (architect) =

Norwegian architect (1874–1936)

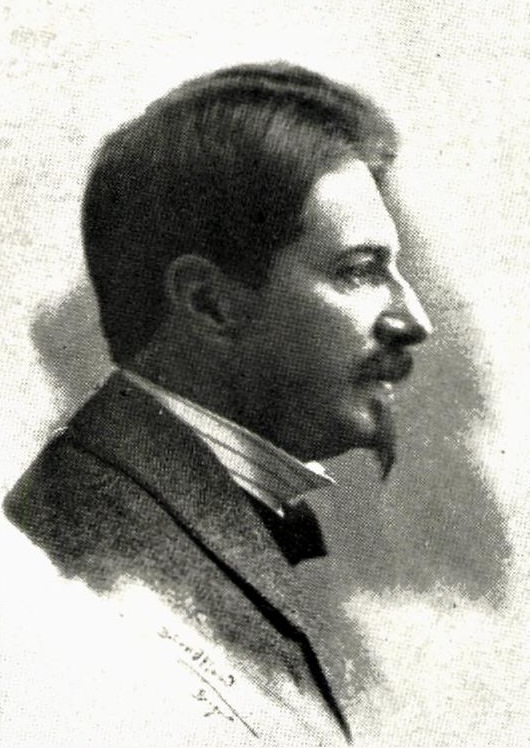
Sigurd Lunde

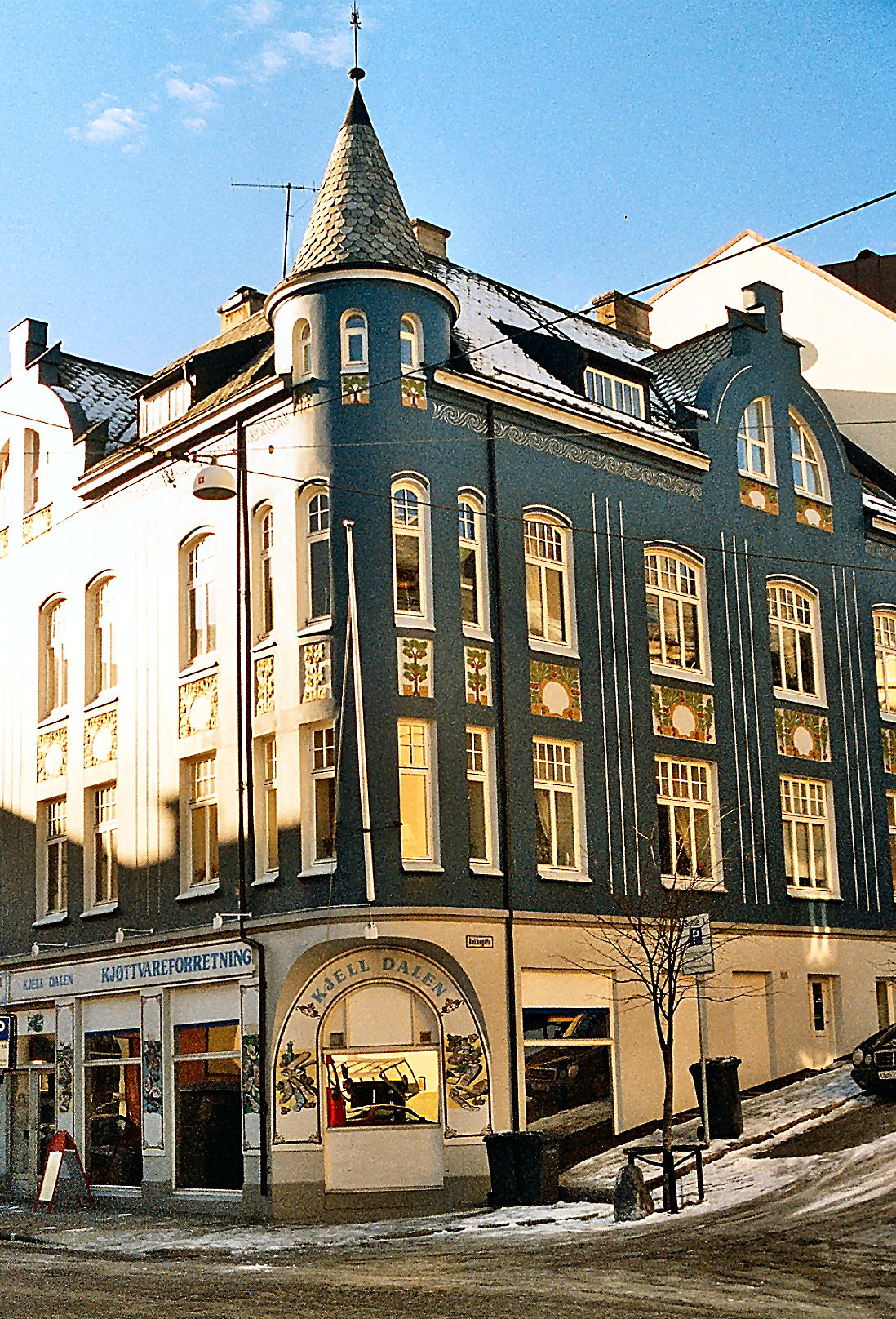
Apotekergata in Ålesund (1904-05)

Sigurd Lunde (4 June 1874 – 3 December 1936) was a Norwegian architect. He was born in Bergen, Norway. From 1894–95, he worked as an assistant to architect Jens Zetlitz Monrad Kielland. He attended Königliche Technische Hochschule in Charlottenburg (now Technische Universität Berlin) from 1896–98, and established his own practice in Bergen in 1898. From 1904–1906 he worked in Ålesund, participating in rebuilding the city after the 1904 fire. He became one of the more prolific architects in western Norway. He also designed interiors and furniture.

In 1901 he married Inga Grue (1870–1948), with whom he had a son, Nazi ideologist and politician Gulbrand Lunde.

== Selected works ==
- Apotekergata in Ålesund (1904–05)
- Steffensengården, Hellegaten 1 in Ålesund (1904–05)
- Hoffgården, Kongens gate 19 in Ålesund (1906–07)
- Schieldrops Hotel, Kongens gate 28 in Ålesund (1906)
