= Hugo Wenzel =

German politician (1891–1940)

- Born: 23 August 1891; Bojanowo, Province of Posen, Germany
- Died: 24 January 1940 (aged 48); Sachsenhausen concentration camp, Oranienburg, Brandenburg, Germany
- Occupation: Politician
- Political party: SPD; USPD; KPD

Hugo Wenzel (23 August 1891 – 24 January 1940) was a German politician (SPD, USPD, KPD). He became a Communist Party activist and, from 1921, a member of the Regional Legislature for Mecklenburg-Schwerin. When he died he was an inmate at the Sachsenhausen concentration camp.

== Life ==
Hugo Wenzel was born in Bojanowo, a small town in the eastern part of Germany. His father worked in a Steam mill. Wenzel himself trained for work as a blacksmith and then undertook a period as a wandering journeyman. In 1908 he joined the Social Democratic Party (SPD / Sozialdemokratische Partei Deutschlands). In 1913 he was conscripted into the army. The outbreak of war in August 1914 meant that his period of military service was extended. He served as a gunner. In political terms the war led to a period of fragmentation of the political left. Having already joined the pacifist Spartacus League, in 1917 Hugo Wenzel joined the newly established Independent Social Democratic Party (USPD / Unabhängige Sozialdemokratische Partei Deutschlands) which had split from the mainstream SPD primarily over the issue of continuing support for the war. At the start of 1918 he deserted from the army. During the revolutionary year that followed German defeat in the First World War Wenzel was a member of a soldiers' and workers' council. He also joined the local Workers' Army (Arbeiterwehr) in Diedenhofen.

Thionville was part of the region transferred to France in 1919, and early that year Wenzel moved to Mecklenburg in the north of Germany. He joined the Communist Party in Wismar, and quickly became a leading official of the new party in the Mecklenburg district. From March 1919 he was party secretary. In March 1921 he was elected a member of the Regional Legislature (Landtag). In the regional elections of February 1924 he was re-elected, becoming leader of the 9 member Communist Party group in the chamber. Regional elections saw a retreat from the extremist parties of both left and right, which ushered in a few years of relative political stability for Germany, but left the Communists with just three members in the Mecklenburg-Schwerin Regional Legislature. Hugo Wenzel was one of these. The other two were Alfred Buhler and Hans Warnke. By judicious abstention they made possible regional government by an SPD led minority coalition under Paul Schröder, but this gave rise to accusations of "opportunistic deviation" ("opportunistischen Entgleisung") from the national Central Committee of their own Communist Party.

There was a further regional election in 1927 after which he no longer sat as a Landtag member. Having lost the immunity that had been provided by his membership of the legislature, Wenzel found himself facing the threat of a prison sentence. He was relieved by the Communist Party of his position as regional party secretary and spent two months in a sanatorium. He relocated to the Soviet Union where he studied at the International Lenin School (Comintern academy) in Moscow. In October 1928 he returned to Germany and became editor in chief of "Volksecho", a locally based complementary publication in Brandenburg for Die Rote Fahne, which had become the Communist Party newspaper nationally.

In March 1930 Hugo Wenzel found himself in a Leipzig court where he was sentenced to a fifteen-month jail term. The court justified a "particularly harsh sentence" in its judgement, because the defendant, by trade a blacksmith, had acquired an exceptionally wide knowledge through his own powers and by studying at the Communist academy. In the summer of 1931, he was released from prison in Gollnow and returned to his editorial duties.

In January 1933 the NSDAP (Nazi Party) took power and lost little time in switching to one-party government in Germany. While all political parties other than the Nazi Party were banned, the new chancellor, Adolf Hitler was particularly vitriolic in his opposition to the Communist Party. In February 1933 Wenzel moved to Berlin and "went underground". He made his apartment available to the Communist Party "Anti-military group", which was a cover for a party news agency, under the leadership of Wilhelm Bahnik, to whom Wenzel was related. In July 1933 Wenzel was arrested and detained in a series of prisons and concentration camps. Although he was being held under investigative pretrial detention, in May 1934 he was unexpectedly released due to "lack of evidence". He then worked at the Siemens-Schuckert plant in Berlin. War returned in 1939. Wenzel was rearrested and held at the Sachsenhausen concentration camp. He was again accused in connection with the party "Anti-military group". Wenzel was by now suffering badly with Pulmonary tuberculosis, and on 24 January 1940 he died in the concentration camp.
