= Albert Viljam Hagelin =

Norwegian politician (1881–1946)

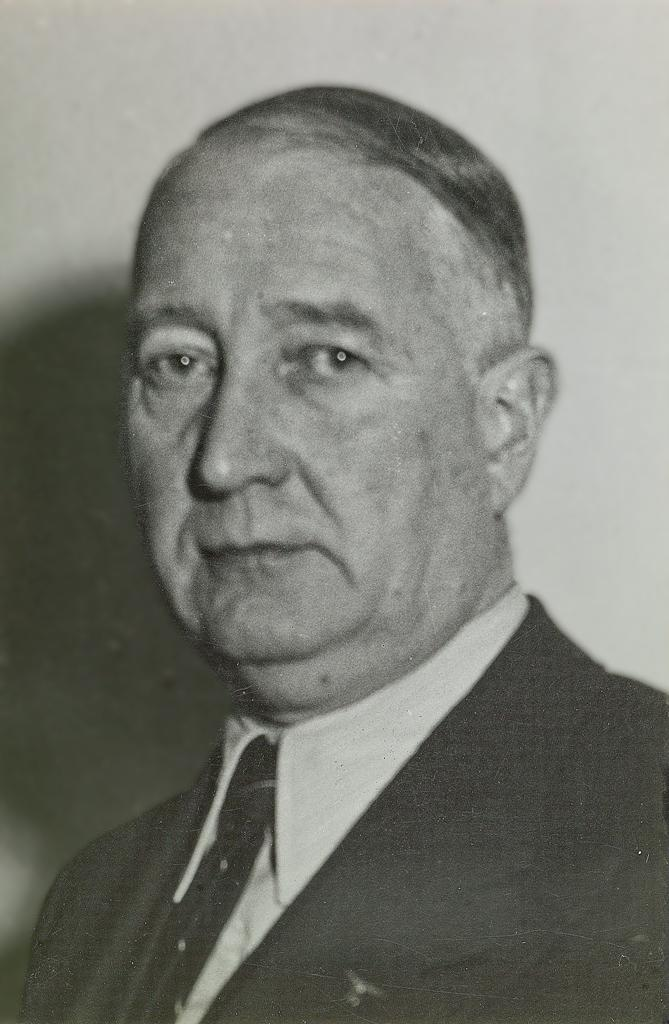
- Born: 24 April 1881; Bergen, Norway
- Died: 25 May 1946 (aged 65); Akershus Fortress, Oslo, Norway
- Political party: Nasjonal Samling (1935–1945)
- Status: Executed by firing squad
- Conviction: Treason
- Penalty: Death

Albert Viljam Hagelin (24 April 1881 – 25 May 1946) was a Norwegian businessman and opera singer who became the Minister of Domestic Affairs in the Quisling regime, the puppet government headed by Vidkun Quisling during Germany's World War II occupation of Norway.

== Early life ==
Albert Viljam Hagelin's father, Harald Joachim Hagelin, was a goldsmith who died when his son was nine years old. He was part of a Swedish family that immigrated to Norway in the early 18th century. Hagelin's mother, Gerd Anna Hedvig Eleonore Meyer, was of Danish-Jewish descent, and her father was also a goldsmith; as a widow, she ran a private hotel in Bergen after the family's jewelry business was closed down. Albert Hagelin was the brother-in-law of Kjeld Stub Irgens and the brother of the Conservative politician and factory owner Robert Hagelin.

== Career in Germany ==
Hagelin left Norway around 1900 to study as an architect at the Technische Hochschule in Dresden. Later, Nina Grieg encouraged him to study music. According to family tradition, he sang operatic roles in both Berlin and Dresden. In total, Hagelin lived abroad for over 40 years until the end of the 1930s, mostly in Dresden. Hagelin married the owner of an import company in Bremen and increased his fortune through successful stock market speculation, coffee business, art trade and hotel business. In the 1930s, the couple lived in Loschwitz outside Dresden. After his wife's death in January 1935, Hagelin also became very ill, to the extent that he had to be hospitalized the day after his wife's funeral. Hagelin went on a longer tour of Norway. While visiting Oslo, he sought out Vidkun Quisling. Details from the two conversations are not known, but Hagelin shortly afterwards joined Nasjonal Samling (NS).

In the spring of 1939, Hagelin tried to obtain German money for the NS newspaper Fritt Folk. Through his tennis club in Dresden, he knew Hermann Göring's nephew Herbert Göring and thus came into contact with the country's top management. The funding attempts failed. However, Hagelin managed to establish ties with other German leaders and came into contact with Grand Admiral Erich Raeder and the NSDAP's chief ideologist Alfred Rosenberg. Quisling visited Hagelin in Germany in the summer of 1939, and the two became well acquainted.

== World War II ==
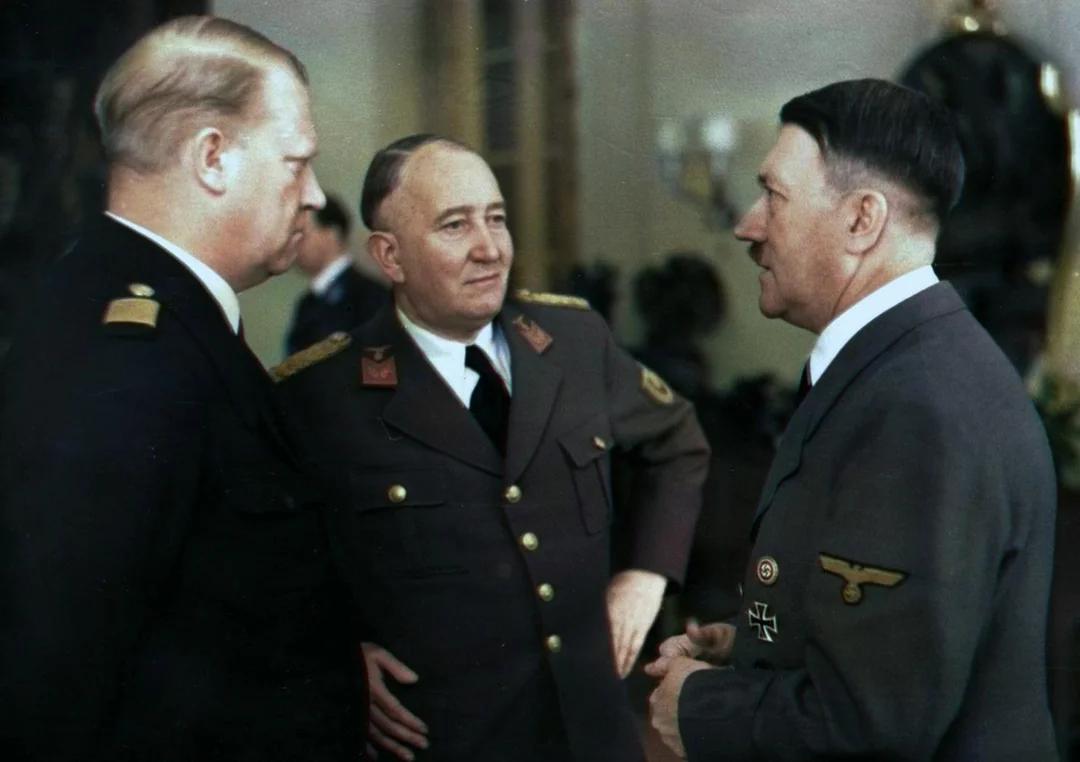
Albert Viljam Hagelin with Adolf Hitler and Vidkun Quisling, 13 February 1942

When World War II broke out, Hagelin blamed the war on a "Judeo-Masonic Clique". With Quisling's coup on 9 April 1940, Hagelin was appointed Minister of Trade and Supply, and thus gained a place in the innermost NS circles. Later that year, he became county leader for Oslo and Akershus, and the party's deputy leader. He thus became Quisling's deputy and in practice party leader in the summer of 1940 when Quisling stayed in Germany for a longer period of time.

In the autumn of 1940, Hagelin was appointed head of the newly established Ministry of the Interior, as part of Josef Terboven's commissary cabinet. He was thus responsible for the nazification of the municipalities through the Municipal Ordinance and for the NS takeover of organizational life and public administration in general. He had the jurist Thorleif Dahl with him as a ministerial adviser. Among other things, they had to defend "Norwegian" interests vis-à-vis Terboven, and among other things were coached on a German initiative on a tax reform that would finance the occupation. Hagelin also pressured Quisling to reach a final peace agreement with Germany.

His cooperation with the Germans worsened throughout the war. Among other things, he was against the arrest and deportation of the Norwegian Jews and was in favor of the administration of Jewish affairs being placed under the Ministry of the Interior. Terboven eventually made it clear that Norway's position would be stronger if Hagelin disappeared.

Rumors gradually circulated within NS that Hagelin was of Jewish blood, and that he was corrupt. The rumors became so strong that Quisling had to launch an investigation. While this was going on, Hagelin was stripped of his post as county manager in Greater Oslo. The investigation cleared Hagelin. Nevertheless, he was later forced to resign in the autumn of 1944, when he refused to go to Finnmark to lead the forced evacuation. For the rest of the occupation, he lived in seclusion on Bygdøy.

== Death ==
Hagelin was sentenced to death during the Norwegian post-war trials. He was executed by firing squad at Oslo's Akershus Fortress, where many of the 37 individuals condemned for treason and war crimes were executed.
