= Tormod Kristoffer Hustad =

Norwegian politician (1889–1973)

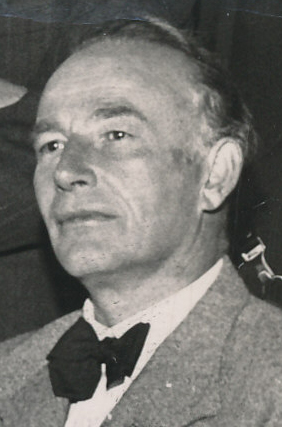
- Tormod Kristoffer Hustad

Personal details
- Born: February 15, 1889 Sandvollan, Norway
- Died: August 19, 1973 (aged 84) Oslo, Norway
- Resting place: Ullern Cemetery, Oslo
- Party: Nasjonal Samling (1933–1945)
- Relations: Peder Konrad Hustad (brother)
- Parent: Tørris Hustad

Tormod Kristoffer Hustad (15 February 1889 – 19 August 1973) was the Norwegian minister of agriculture in the 1940 pro-Nazi puppet government of Vidkun Quisling, provisional councilor of state for agriculture in the government appointed by Reichskommissar Josef Terboven in 1940, and minister of labour in the NS government 1942–1944. He was replaced by Hans Skarphagen in 1944. In the post-war legal purges he was convicted of treason and sentenced to life imprisonment and forced labour.

Hustad is also known as the designer of the NTH ring, having won an international design competition as an architecture student in 1914.
