= Quisling regime =

Collaborationist puppet government within Reichskommissariat Norwegen (1942–45)

National Government Den nasjonale regjering
- 1942–1945
- Flag Coat of arms
- Anthem: Ja, vi elsker dette landet (English: "Yes, we love this country")
- Status: Puppet government of Nazi Germany, de facto co-rule under Reichskommissariat Norwegen
- Capital: Oslo
- Common languages: Norwegian
- Government: Fascist state
- Minister President
  - 1942–1945: Vidkun Quisling
- Historical era: World War II
  - Proclamation: 1 February 1942
  - German capitulation: 8 May 1945
- Currency: Norwegian krone (NOK)
Preceded by	Succeeded by
Reichskommissariat Norwegen	Kingdom of Norway
- Today part of: Norway

The Quisling regime or Quisling government was the collaborationist puppet government led by Vidkun Quisling in German-occupied Norway during the Second World War. The official name of the regime from 1 February 1942 until its dissolution in May 1945 was the National Government (Norwegian: Den nasjonale regjering). Actual executive power was retained by the Reichskommissariat Norwegen, headed by Josef Terboven.

== 1940 coup ==
Vidkun Quisling, Fører of the Nasjonal Samling party, first tried to carry out a coup against the Norwegian government on 9 April 1940, the day of the German invasion of Norway. At 7:32 p.m., Quisling visited the studios of the Norwegian Broadcasting Corporation and made a radio broadcast. In the broadcast, he proclaimed himself Prime Minister and ordered all resistance to halt immediately. He announced that he and Nasjonal Samling were taking power due to Nygaardsvold's Cabinet having "raised armed resistance and promptly fled". He further declared that, in the present situation, it was "the duty and the right of the movement of Nasjonal Samling to take over governmental power". Quisling claimed that the Nygaardsvold Cabinet had given up power, even though it had only moved to Elverum, some 140 kilometres (87 mi) from Oslo, and was carrying out negotiations with the Germans.

The next day, German ambassador Curt Bräuer travelled to Elverum and demanded King Haakon VII return to Oslo and formally appoint Quisling as prime minister. Haakon stalled for time, telling the ambassador that Norwegian kings could not make political decisions on their own authority. At a Cabinet meeting later that night, Haakon said that he could not in good conscience appoint Quisling as prime minister because he knew neither the people nor the Storting had confidence in him. Haakon further stated that he would abdicate rather than appoint a government headed by Quisling. By this time, news of Quisling's attempted coup had reached Elverum. Negotiations promptly collapsed, and the government unanimously advised Haakon not to appoint Quisling as prime minister.

Quisling tried to have the Nygaardsvold Cabinet arrested, but the officer he instructed to carry out the arrest ignored the warrant. Attempts at gaining control over the police force in Oslo by issuing orders to Kristian Welhaven, the chief of police, also failed. The coup failed after six days, despite German support for the first three days, and Quisling had to step aside in the occupied parts of Norway in favour of the Administrative Council (Administrasjonsrådet). The Administrative Council was formed on 15 April by members of the Supreme Court and supported by Norwegian business leaders as well as Bräuer as an alternative to Quisling's Nasjonal Samling in the occupied areas.

=== First Government of Vidkun Quisling ===
The First Government of Vidkun Quisling was formed on April 9 1940, and was dissolved 6 days later on April 15 1940.

The cabinet members:

- Prime Minister: Vidkun Quisling
- Minister of Agriculture and Food: Tormod Kristoffer Hustad
- Minister of Justice and Public Security: Jonas Lie

== Provisional Councillors of State ==
On 25 September 1940, German Reichskommissar Josef Terboven, who on 24 April 1940 had replaced Curt Bräuer as the top civilian commander in Norway, proclaimed the deposition of King Haakon VII and the Nygaardsvold Cabinet, banning all political parties other than Nasjonal Samling. Terboven then appointed a group of 11 kommissariske statsråder (English: provisional councillors of state) from Nasjonal Samling to help him in governing Norway. Although the provisional councillors of state did not form a government, the intention of the Germans was to use them to prepare the way for a Nasjonal Samling take-over of power in the future. Vidkun Quisling was made the political head of the councillors and all members of Nasjonal Samling had to swear a personal oath of allegiance to him. Most of the councillors worked diligently at introducing Nasjonal Samling ideals and politics. Amongst the schemes introduced during the council period was the introduction of labour duty, reforms of the labour market, the penal code and the system of justice, a reorganization of the police and the introduction of national socialist ideals in the Norwegian culture scene. The provisional councillors of state were intended as a temporary system while Nasjonal Samling built up its organization in preparation for assuming full governmental powers. On 25 September 1941, the one-year anniversary of the councillors, Terboven gave them the title of "ministers".

== Government ==
Nasjonal Samling's sun cross and eagle insignia (1942-1945) was used as a co-official state emblem and replaced the Norwegian coat of arms in some places, such as government stamps and in the emblem of the state police. The emblem was modelled after the nazi emblem of Germany and represented the Nasjonal Samling party as the "ruling party" (statsbærende parti), as it was the only legal political party.

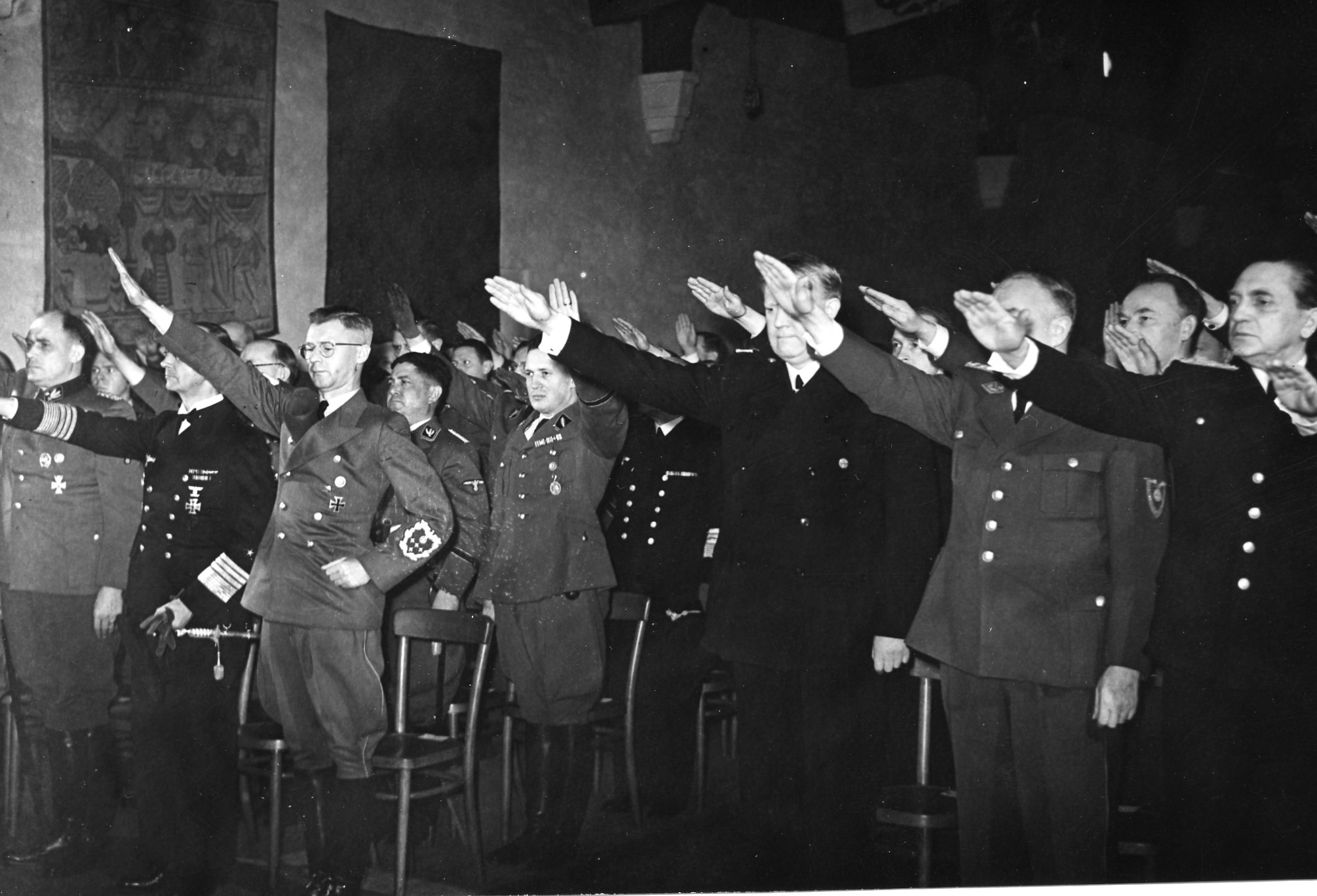
The establishment of Quisling's national government was proclaimed at Akershus Fortress. On the left side of the hall are Terboven (third from left) and several German officers, on the right Quisling (third from right) and several of his ministers

With the establishment of Quisling's national government, Quisling, as minister-president, temporarily assumed the authority of both the King and the Parliament.

In 1942, after two years of direct civilian administration by the Germans (which continued de facto until 1945), he was finally put in charge of a collaborationist government, which was officially proclaimed on 1 February 1942. The official name of the government was "Den nasjonale regjering" (English: the National Government). The original intention of the Germans had been to hand over the sovereignty of Norway to the new government, but by mid-January 1942 Hitler decided to retain the civilian Reichskommissariat Norwegen under Terboven. The Quisling government was instead given the role of an occupying authority with wide-ranging authorisations. Quisling himself viewed the creation of his government as a "decisive step on the road towards the complete independence of Norway". Although having only temporarily assumed the King's authority, Quisling still made efforts to distance his regime from the exiled monarchy. After Quisling moved into the Royal Palace he took back into use the official seal of Norway, changing the wording from "Haakon VII Norges konge" to "Norges rikes segl" (in English, from "Haakon VII King of Norway" to "The Seal of the Norwegian Realm"). After establishing national government Quisling claimed to hold "the authority that according to the Constitution belonged to the King and Parliament".

Other important ministers of the collaborationist government were Jonas Lie (also head of the Norwegian wing of the SS from 1941) as Minister of the Police, Gulbrand Lunde as Minister of Culture and Enlightenment, as well as the opera singer Albert Viljam Hagelin, who was Minister of the Interior.

== Politics ==
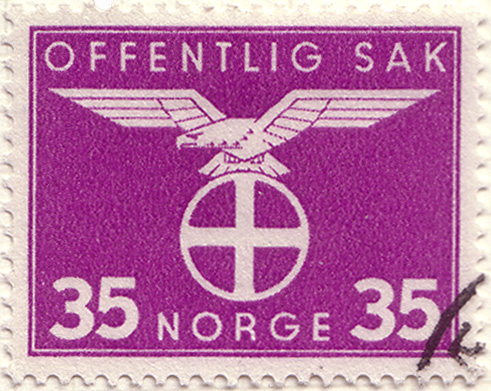
Stamp of the State service

One of Quisling's first actions was to reintroduce the prohibition of Jews entering Norway, which was formerly a part of the Constitution's §2 from 1814 to 1851.

Two of the early laws of the Quisling regime, Lov om nasjonal ungdomstjeneste (English: 'Law on national youth service') and Lov om Norges Lærersamband (English: 'The Norwegian Teacher Liaison'), both signed 5 February 1942, led to massive protests from parents, serious clashes with the teachers, and an escalating conflict with the Church of Norway. Schools were closed for one month, and in March 1942 around 1,100 teachers were arrested by the Norwegian police and sent to German prisons and concentration camps, and about 500 of the teachers were forced to Kirkenes as construction workers for the German occupants.

== Goal of independence ==
Even after the official creation of the Quisling government, Josef Terboven still ruled Norway as a dictator, taking orders from no-one but Hitler. Quisling's regime was a puppet government, although Quisling wanted independence and the recall of Terboven, something he constantly lobbied Hitler for, without success. Quisling wanted to achieve independence for Norway under his rule, with an end to the German occupation of Norway through a peace treaty and the recognition of Norway's sovereignty by Germany. He further wanted to ally Norway to Germany and join the Anti-Comintern Pact. After a reintroduction of national service in Norway, Norwegian troops were to fight with the Axis in the Second World War.

Quisling also fronted the idea of a pan-European union led, but not dominated, by Germany, with a common currency and a common market. Quisling presented his plans to Hitler repeatedly in memos and talks with the German dictator, the first time on 13 February 1942 in the Reich Chancellery in Berlin and the last time on 28 January 1945, again in the Reich Chancellery. All of Quisling's ideas were rejected by Hitler, who did not want any permanent agreements before the war had been concluded, and also wanted Norway's outright annexation into Germany as the northernmost province of a Greater Germanic Reich. Hitler did, however, in an April 1943 meeting, promise Quisling that once the war was over Norway would regain its independence. This is the only known case of Hitler making such a promise to an occupied country.

The word Quisling has become synonymous with treachery and collaboration with the enemy.

=== Territorial claims ===
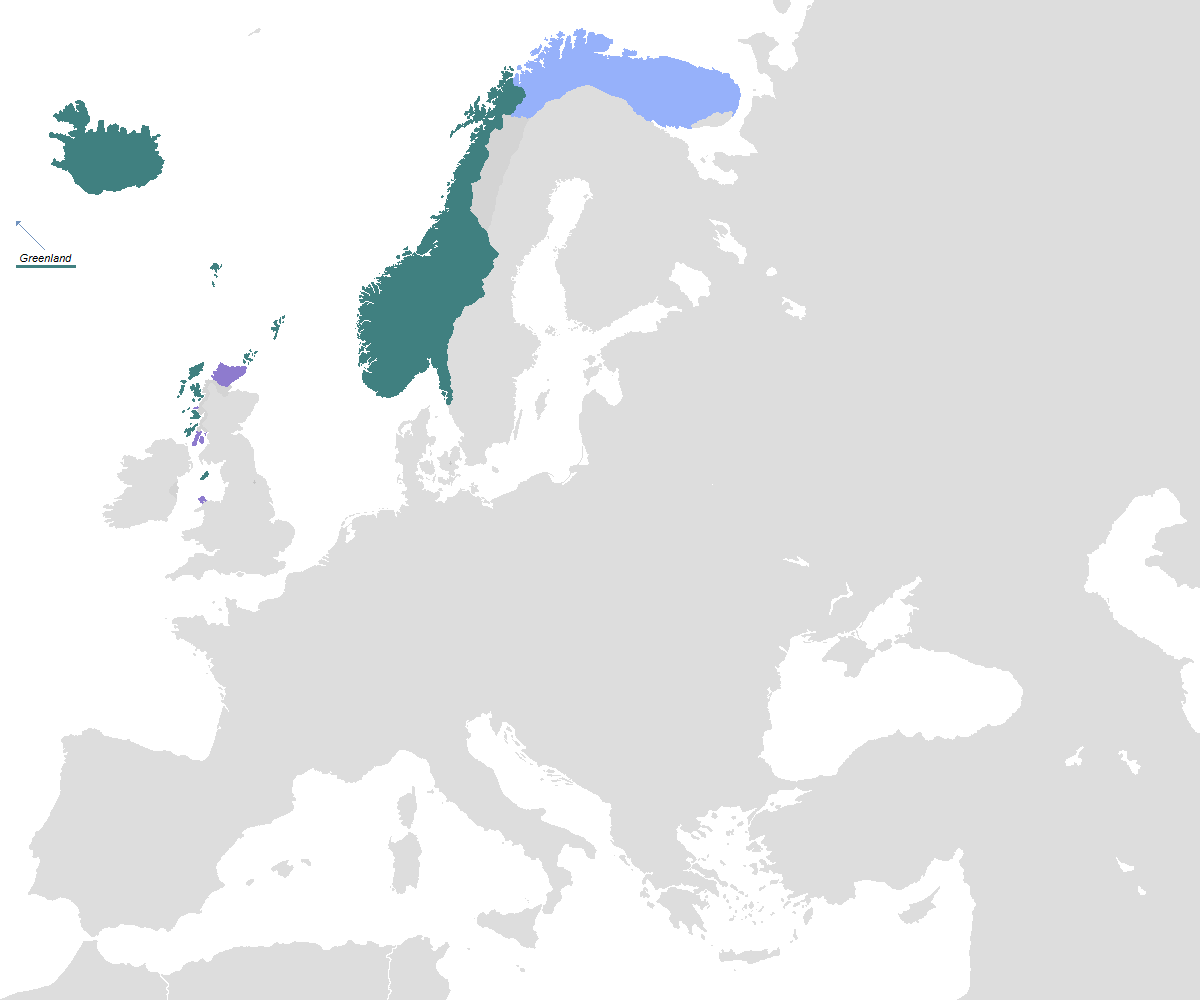
The Norwegian Kingdom at its greatest extent, c. 1265

The regime looked nostalgically to the High Middle Ages of the country's history, known in Norwegian historiography as Norgesveldet, during which Norwegian territory extended beyond its current borders. Quisling envisioned an extension of the Norwegian state by its annexation of the Kola Peninsula with its small Norwegian minority, so a Greater Norway spanning the entire North European coastline could be created. Further expansion was expected in Northern Finland, to link the Kola peninsula with Finnmark: Nasjonal Samling leaders had mixed views on the post-war Finnish-Norwegian border, but the potential Norwegian annexation of at least the Finnish municipalities of Petsamo (Norwegian: Petsjenga) and Inari (Norwegian: Enare) was under consideration.

Nasjonal Samling publications called for the annexation of the historically Norwegian Swedish provinces of Jämtland (Norwegian: Jemtland), Härjedalen (Norwegian: Herjedalen) and Bohuslän (Norwegian: Båhuslen) In March 1944, Quisling met with Wehrmacht general Rudolf Bamler, and urged the Germans to invade Sweden from Finnish Lapland (using the forces delegated to the German Lapland Army) and through the Baltic as a preemptive strike against Sweden joining the war on the Allied side. Quisling's proposal was sent to both OKW chief Alfred Jodl and SS leader Heinrich Himmler.

Quisling and Jonas Lie, leader of the Germanic SS in Norway, also furthered irredentist Norwegian claims to the Faroes (Norwegian: Færøyene), Iceland (Norwegian: Island), Orkney (Norwegian: Orknøyene), Shetland (Norwegian: Hjaltland), the Outer Hebrides (historically a part of the Norse Kingdom of Mann and the Isles under the name Sørøyene, "South Islands") and Franz Josef Land (earlier claimed by Norway under the name Fridtjof Nansen Land), most of which were former Norwegian territories passed on to Danish rule after the dissolution of Denmark-Norway in 1814, while the rest were former Viking Age settlements. Norway had already claimed a part of Eastern Greenland in 1931 (under the name Eirik Raudes Land), but the claim was extended during the occupation period to cover Greenland as a whole. During the spring of 1941, Quisling laid out plans to "reconquer" the island using a task force of a hundred men, but the Germans deemed this plan unfeasible. In the person of propaganda minister Gulbrand Lunde the Norwegian puppet government further lay claim to the North and South Poles. During the late 19th and early 20th centuries, Norway had gained prestige as a nation active in polar expedition: the South Pole was first reached by the Norwegian explorer Roald Amundsen in 1911, and in 1939 Norway had claimed a region of Antarctica under the name Queen Maud Land (Norwegian: Dronning Maud Land).

After Germany's invasion of the Soviet Union, preparations were made for establishing Norwegian colonies in Northern Russia. Quisling designated the area reserved for Norwegian colonization as Bjarmeland, a reference to the name featured in the Norse sagas for Northern Russia.

== Dissolution ==
Quisling's regime ceased to exist in 1945, with the end of World War II in Europe. Norway was still under occupation in May 1945, but Vidkun Quisling and most of his ministers surrendered at Møllergata 19 police station on 9 May, one day after Germany's surrender. The new Norwegian unification government tried him on 20 August for numerous crimes; he was convicted on 10 September and was executed by firing squad on 24 October 1945. Other Nazi collaborators, as well as Germans accused of war crimes, were also arrested and tried during this legal purge.

== Ministers of the Quisling regime ==
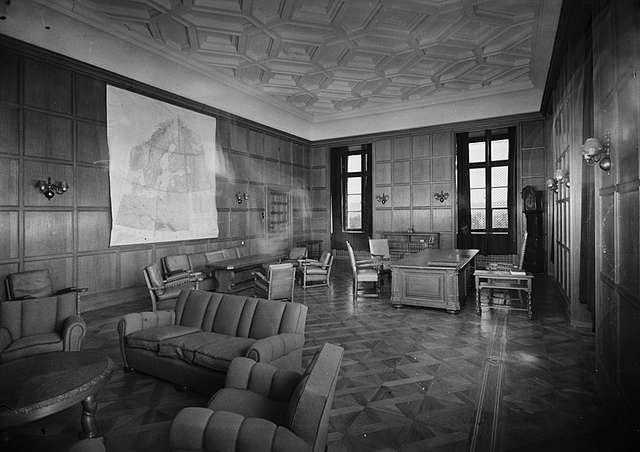
Quisling's former office at the Royal Palace, in June 1945

The ministers of the Quisling regime in 1942 were:

Title	Minister		Term of office	
Title	Minister		Start	End
Minister President	Vidkun Quisling	Vidkun Quisling	1 February 1942	8 May 1945
Minister of Finance	Frederik Prytz	Frederik Prytz	1 February 1942	19 February 1945
Minister of Finance	Per von Hirsch	Per von Hirsch	19 February 1945	8 May 1945
Minister of Interior	Albert Viljam Hagelin	Albert Viljam Hagelin	1 February 1942	8 November 1944
Minister of Interior	Arnvid Vasbotten	Arnvid Vasbotten	8 November 1944	8 May 1945
Minister of Shipping	Kjeld Stub Irgens	Kjeld Stub Irgens	1 February 1942	12 June 1944
Minister of Agriculture	Thorstein Fretheim	Thorstein Fretheim	1 February 1942	21 April 1945
Minister of Agriculture		Trygve Dehli Laurantzon	21 April 1945	8 May 1945
Minister of Labour	Tormod Hustad	Tormod Hustad	1 February 1942	1 February 1944
Minister of Labour	Hans Skarphagen	Hans Skarphagen	1 February 1944	8 May 1945
Minister of Church and Educational Affairs	Ragnar Skancke	Ragnar Skancke	1 February 1942	8 May 1945
Minister of Justice	Sverre Riisnæs	Sverre Riisnæs	1 February 1942	8 May 1945
Minister of Police	Jonas Lie (government minister)	Jonas Lie	1 February 1942	8 May 1945
Minister of Culture and Enlightenment	Gulbrand Lunde	Gulbrand Lunde	1 February 1942	25 October 1942
Minister of Culture and Enlightenment	Rolf Jørgen Fuglesang	Rolf Jørgen Fuglesang	25 October 1942	8 May 1945
Minister of Social Affairs	Johan Andreas Lippestad	Johan Andreas Lippestad	1 February 1942	8 May 1945
Minister of Labour Service and Sports	Axel Heiberg Stang	Axel Stang	1 February 1942	8 May 1945
Minister of Industry	Eivind Blehr	Eivind Blehr	1 February 1942	12 June 1944
Minister of Industry	Alf Whist	Alf Whist	12 June 1944	8 May 1945
Minister without portfolio	Alf Whist	Alf Whist	4 November 1943	12 June 1944

The Quisling regime's leadership saw significant reshuffling and replacements during its existence. When Gulbrand Lunde died in 1942, Rolf Jørgen Fuglesang took over his ministry as well as retaining his own. Eivind Blehr's two ministries were merged in 1943 as the Ministry of Commerce. On 4 November 1943 Alf Whist joined the government as a minister without portfolio.

Tormod Hustad was replaced by Hans Skarphagen on 1 February 1944. Both Kjeld Stub Irgens and Eivind Blehr were fired in June 1944. Their former ministries were merged and placed under the control of Alf Whist as Minister of Commerce. On 8 November 1944, Albert Viljam Hagelin was fired from his position and replaced by Arnvid Vasbotten. When Frederik Prytz died in February 1945, he was replaced by Per von Hirsch. Thorstein Fretheim was fired on 21 April 1945, to be replaced by Trygve Dehli Laurantzon.

Preceded by Nygaardsvold's Cabinet	Government of Norway (Pro-German puppet regime) Royal government of Norway in exile Nygaardsvold's Cabinet 1942–1945	Succeeded by Nygaardsvold's Cabinet
