= Gulbrand Lunde =

Norwegian politician (1901–1942)

Gulbrand Oscar Johan Lunde
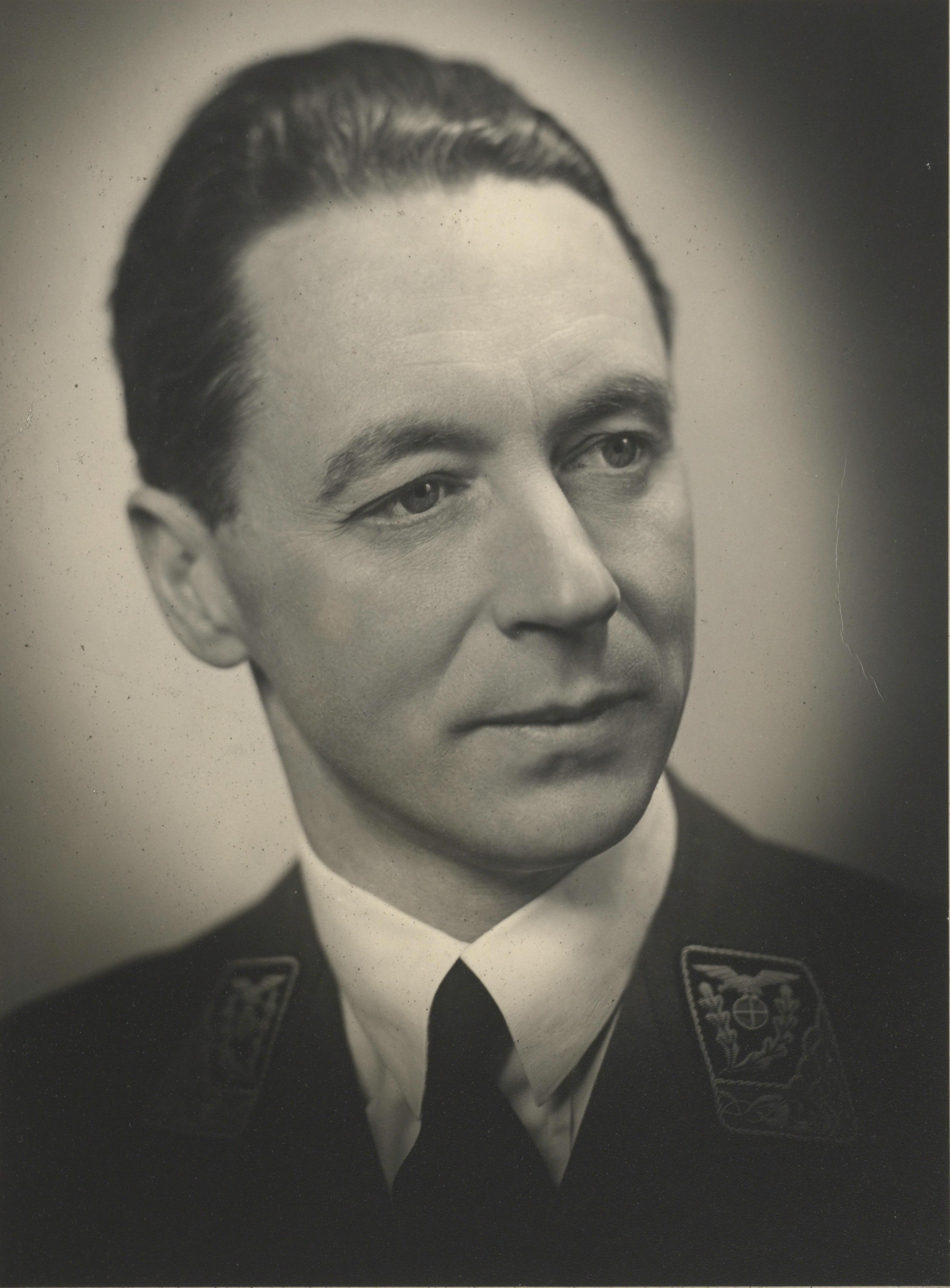
- Lunde c. 1940

Minister of Culture and Public Information (The National Government)
- In office 1 February 1942 – 25 October 1942

Minister of Culture and Public Information (Reichskommissariat Norwegen)
- In office 25 September 1941 – 1 February 1942

Provisional Nasjonal Samling Councilor of State for Culture and Public Information (Reichskommissariat Norwegen)
- In office 25 September 1940 – 25 September 1941

Minister of Social Affairs (Quisling's First Cabinet) (did not take office)
- In office 9 April 1940 – 15 April 1940

Personal details
- Born: 14 September 1901 Bergen, Sweden-Norway
- Died: 25 October 1942 (aged 41) Rauma Municipality, German-occupied Norway
- Cause of death: Drowning
- Party: Nasjonal Samling
- Profession: Chemist

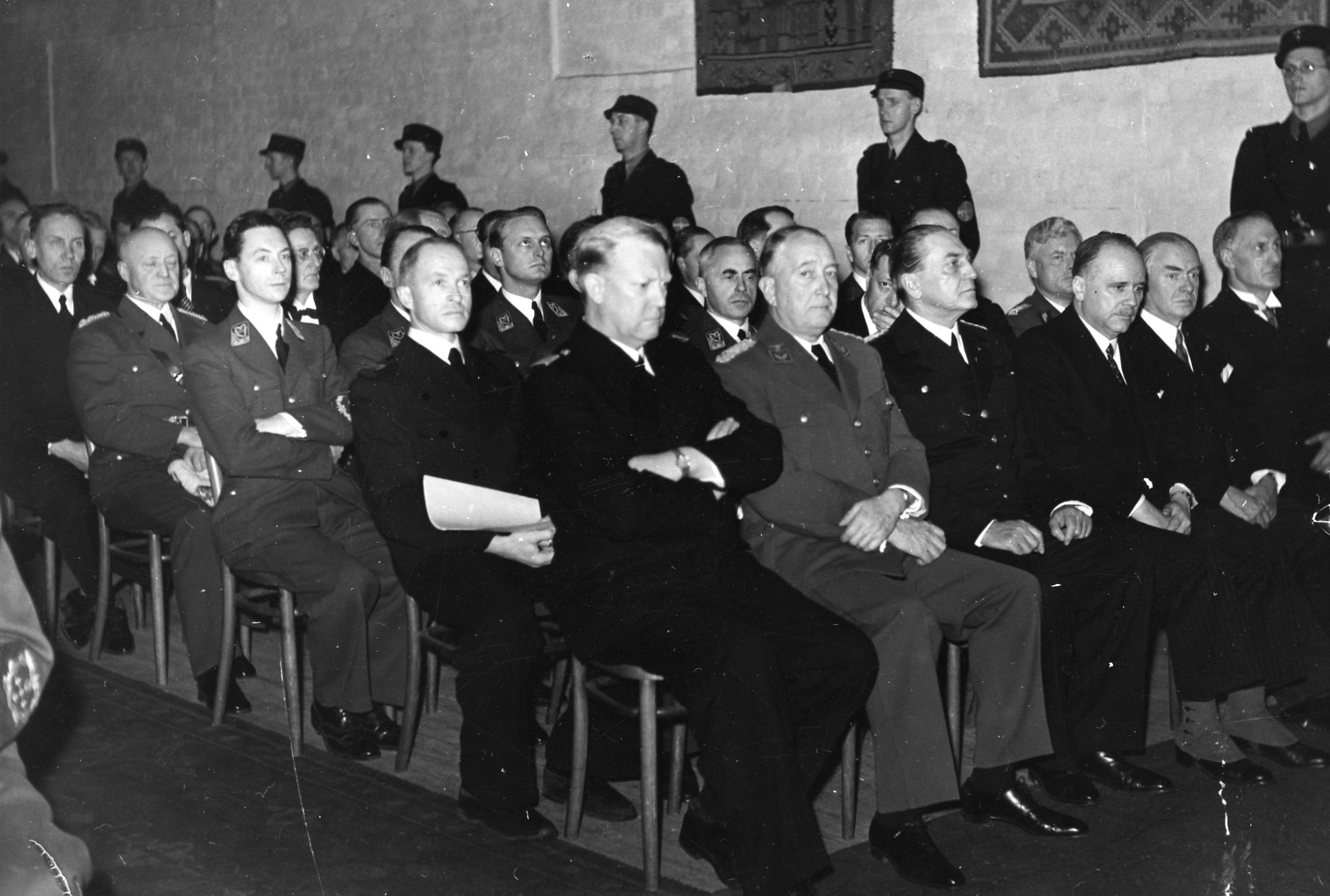
TheStatsakten ceremony at Akershus Castle in Oslo, Norway, on 1 February 1942, in which Reichskommissar Josef Terboven installed Vidkun Quisling (center) as "Minister President" of Norway. Lunde sits second to the left from Quisling.

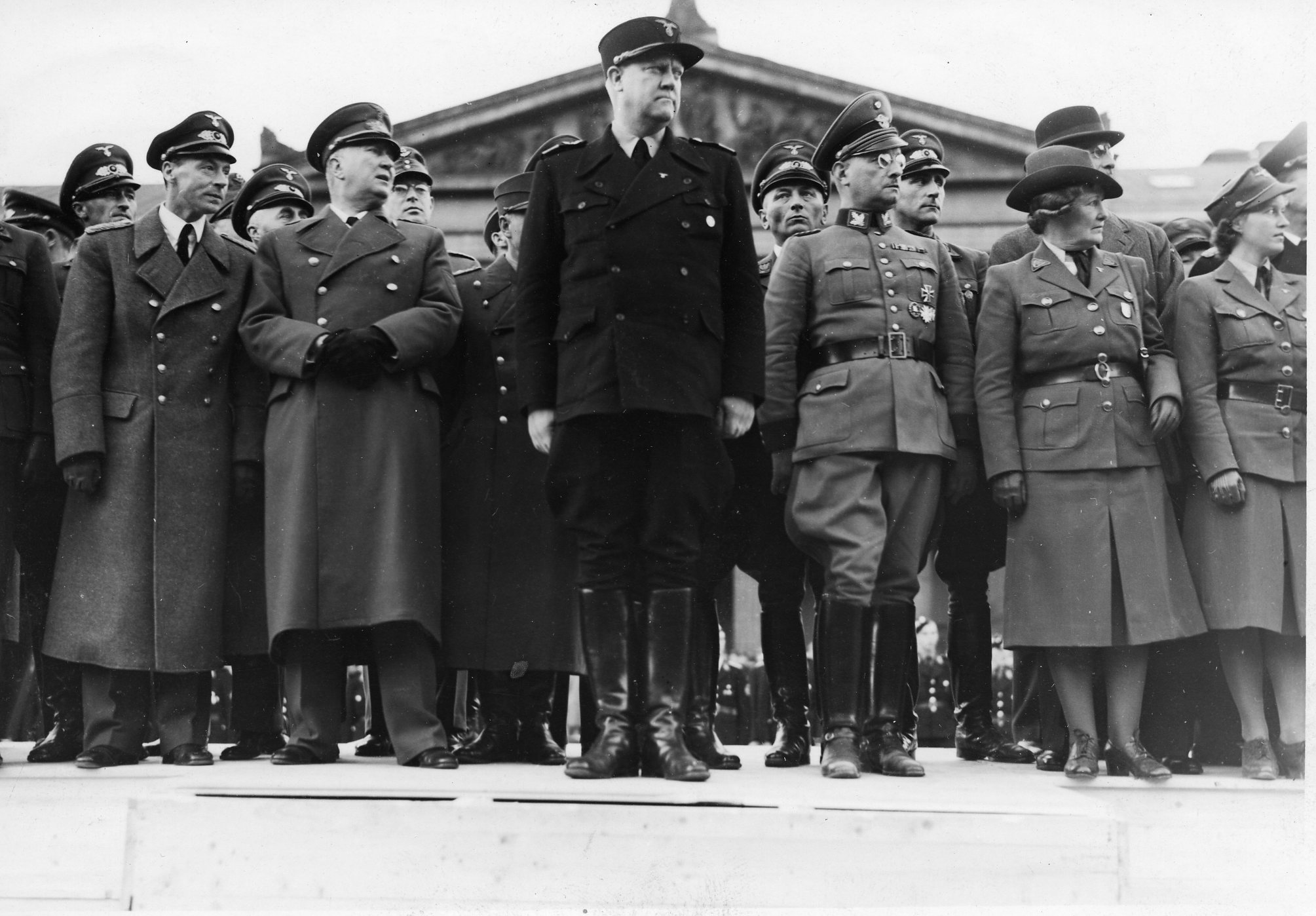
Lunde stands at left for a ceremony during the Nasjonal Samling′s Eighth Party Congress, held in Olso on 26–27 September 1942. Quisling is at center.

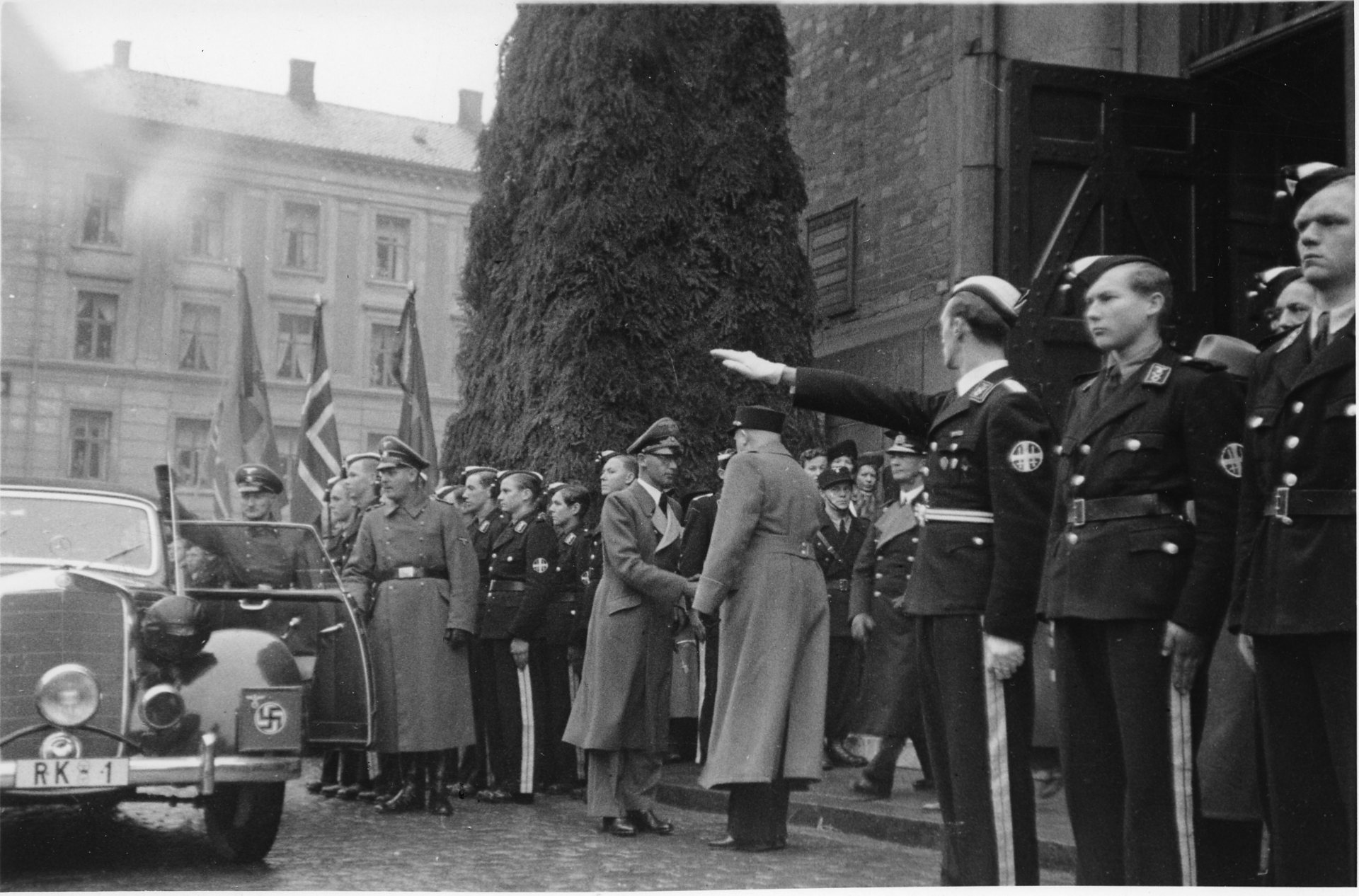
Quisling welcomes Terboven to Trinity Church (Norwegian: Trefoldighetskirken) in Oslo for Lunde's grand state funeral on 1 November 1942.

Gulbrand Oscar Johan Lunde (14 September 1901 – 25 October 1942) was a Norwegian chemist and politician of the Nasjonal Samling party who became a minister in the collaborationist government of Vidkun Quisling during World War II. His 1942 death was deemed accidental, although a 2012 biography of Lunde concluded that he was assassinated because his cultural views clashed with those of the government of Nazi Germany.

== Family ==
Lunde was born in Bergen in what was then Sweden-Norway, the son of architect Sigurd Lunde (1874–1936) and Inga Grue (1870–1948). He was raised in Bergen. On 6 March 1929, he married Marie Honoria Halling Wulfsberg (26 August 1907 – 25 October 1942).

== Education and chemistry career ==
Lunde studied at the ETH Zurich (German: Eidgenössische Technische Hochschule Zürich; English: Federal Institute of Technology Zurich) in Zürich, Switzerland, and at the University of Freiburg in Freiburg im Breisgau, Germany. In 1925 he received a doctorate in chemistry in Germany. In 1927 he was employed at the chemistry department at the University of Oslo in Oslo, Norway. In 1929 he turned down two offers of professorships to become the director of the Hermetikkindustriens Laboratorium (English: Canning Industry Laboratory) in Stavanger, Norway. He was central to the development of the Norwegian canning industry and wrote a number of scientific treatises on biochemistry and on vitamins.

== Nasjonal Samling ==
Lunde quickly distinguished himself as a keen supporter of Vidkun Quisling and was one of the first members of Quisling′s political party, Nasjonal Samling (English: National Gathering). He participated in the establishment of Nasjonal Samling in Stavanger in 1933 and was active in the election campaign the same autumn. He was one of Nasjonal Samling′s foremost speakers and was an efficient administrator. In 1934, he was elected as a municipal council representative in Stavanger when the party received 12 percent of the vote. In 1935 he became Nasjonal Samling′s head of propaganda and authored a number of writings and publications. Nasjonal Samling performed poorly in elections in 1936 and Lunde then spent more time on work and family.

== World War II ==
During World War II, Nazi Germany invaded Norway on 8 April 1940, beginning the Norwegian campaign, in which British, French, and Norwegian forces opposed the invasion. On 9 April 1940, Quisling attempted a coup against Norway's Nygaardsvold government and appointed Lunde minister of social affairs in what is referred to as Quisling′s First Cabinet, but Lunde declined the position. The coup failed after six days, and on 15 April 1940 the Supreme Court of Norway replaced Quisling′s First Cabinet with a seven-member Administrative Council (Norwegian: Administrasjonsrådet) to govern Norway. On 24 April 1940 Josef Terboven became the German Reichskommissar of Norway, and the Norwegian campaign ended on 10 June 1940 in the German conquest of Norway, with the Nygaardsvold government becoming Norway's government-in-exile. Meanwhile, Terboven exercised nearly dictatorial power in Norway, which remained under German occupation for the rest of the war.

On 25 September 1940, Terboven proclaimed the deposition of King Haakon VII of Norway and the Nygaardsvold government-in-exile, banned all political parties in Norway other than Nasjonal Samling, and replaced the Administrative Council by appointing a group of 11 Nasjonal Samling members to help him govern Norway as kommissariske statsråder (English: provisional councilors of state), with a goal of eventually establishing a collaborationist Norwegian government under Nasjonal Samling. Lunde was among the officials Terboven appointed that day, becoming acting minister of culture and public Information. A year later, on 25 September 1941, Terboven gave the 11 councilors the title of "minister." On 1 February 1942, the collaborationist Quisling regime was established as Den nasjonale regjering (English: the National Government) of Norway, technically replacing direct German civil administration of the country, although in practice Terboven continued to govern Norway. Lunde continued to serve as minister of culture and public information in the Quisling regime.

As minister of culture and public information, Lunde tried to gain control over intellectual life in Norway. Through speeches and lectures, he drew cultural historical lines from the Viking Age up to his own time to substantiate his opinions about the development of the Norwegian nation. Professor Gunnar Skirbekk cites German intelligence reports which indicate that the Nazi German government was skeptical of Lunde because he emphasized the Norse people, which meant a demarcation of Norway from the other Germanic peoples.

In September 1942, Lunde and Jim Johanessen, the leader of the music unit of the Nasjonal Samling′s uniformed paramilitary organization Hirden, invited the Jewish violinist Ernst Glaser to a meeting. They arranged transport to Sweden for Glaser to avoid anything happening to him during the Holocaust in Norway.

== Death ==
At 20:30 on 25 October 1942, Lunde, his wife Marie, and county manager for Bergen-Hordaland Christian Astrup departed Ålesund in a car driven by Hirden member Rolf Brennford for a journey that required a ferry passage on the Romsdalsfjord to Eidsbygda and on to Åndalsnes. The car arrived at the ferry terminal at Våge in Veøy Municipality in Romsdal at approximately 22:00. While Lunde and his wife slept in the back seat, Brennford got out of the car. The ferry, guarded by two German officers, started its engine to move a little closer to the quay, but instead it moved away from shore, causing the car to roll forward and plunge into the 5-metre (16.4 ft) deep water. Astrup escaped from the sinking car, but Lunde and his wife drowned. The incident led to an order to install booms at ferry terminals to prevent similar accidents.

A large memorial service was held in Oslo for Lunde and his wife on 1 November 1942. They were cremated, and their urns later were placed at Hopperstad Stave Church near Vikøyri in Vik Municipality, Norway.

The deaths of Lunde and his wife were investigated as suspicious, but the investigation concluded that they were accidental. However, rumors circulated that they were murdered, and a 2012 biography of Lunde concludes that his death was an assassination staged by the Germans, who wanted to get rid of a troublesome minister whose focus on the more narrow "Norse" tradition did not fit in with the wider concept of "Germanic peoples" favored by the Nazi Party.

Rolf Jørgen Fuglesang succeeded Lunde as minister of culture and public information, also retaining his own portfolio as minister of party affairs.
