= Ministry of Culture and Enlightenment =

Former government ministry of Norway

The Ministry of Culture and Enlightenment (Norwegian: Kultur- og folkeopplysningsdepartementet) was a government ministry during the German occupation of Norway, established on 25 September 1940, and closed down at the end of World War II.

The ministry was set up on 25 September 1940 by Reichskommissar Josef Terboven as a consequence of the occupation of Norway by Nazi Germany during World War II. It consisted of three departments and four directorates. The ministry was initially headed by Gulbrand Lunde until 30 November 1942, and thereafter by Rolf Jørgen Fuglesang

One of the departments, the Propaganda Department, was renamed Department for Popular Enlightenment in 1944.

The best known directorate was the Norwegian Press Directorate. The Norwegian Broadcasting Corporation (NRK), the National Gallery of Norway, the Norwegian National Academy of Fine Arts and all other non-scientific museums were subordinate to the Pressedirektoratet.

The department was modelled after the Reichskommissariats Hauptabteilung Volksaufklaerung und Propaganda ("Ministry for Popular Enlightenment and Propaganda"), trying to spread Nazi ideology in Norway.

Documents from this department are archived by the National Archives of Norway.
