= Egil Olbjørn =

Norwegian police leader

Egil Yngvar Olbjørn (3 August 1902 – 1 February 1982) was a Norwegian police leader.

He came to prominence during the occupation of Norway by Nazi Germany, as a member of Nasjonal Samling and supporter of Jonas Lie. He headed the police branch Ordenspolitiet. To a certain degree he tried to resist German control, and was imprisoned for a short period in the autumn of 1944. He was saved from prison by Jonas Lie, and Olbjørn stood by Lie's side when they entrenched themselves at Skallum on 8 May 1945 after the Nazi capitulation; however Olbjørn gave up, and left Skallum some days before Lie (who died there on 11 May).

Olbjørn is also known as a judge (together with Karl Marthinsen and Egil Reichborn-Kjennerud) in the special court that sentenced Gunnar Eilifsen to death in 1943.

During the legal purge in Norway after World War II, Olbjørn was sentenced to 15 years in prison with hard labour, permanent loss of his position, and partial loss of his civil rights for 10 years. On appeal, his prison sentence was reduced to 12 years. Olbjørn was released from prison on 15 December 1950.
