= Henrik Rogstad =

Norwegian politician (1916–1945)

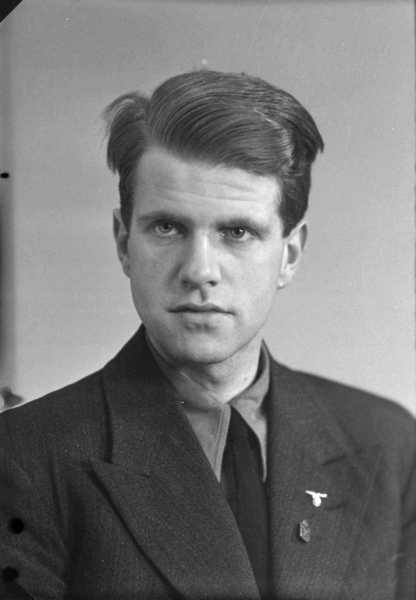
- Henrik Rogstad (1940)

Fylkesfører (Gauleiter) of Sør-Trøndelag

Leader of Hirden
- In office February 1945 – May 1945
- Preceded by: Karl Marthinsen

Chief of Statspolitiet
- In office April 1945 – May 1945

Personal details
- Born: 13 April 1916 Trondheim, Norway
- Died: 10 May 1945 (aged 29) Skallum, Bærum, Norway
- Party: Nasjonal Samling
- Occupation: Politician

Henrik Rogstad (13 April 1916 – 10 May 1945) was a Norwegian politician. He was a police chief for the Norwegian fascist party Nasjonal Samling. During the Second World War he was a fylkesfører (Gauleiter) in the county of Sør-Trøndelag.

Rogstad was a member of the Nasjonal Samling Ungdomsfylking fascist youth organisation and became active within the party in 1940. At the initiative of Rolf Jørgen Fuglesang Rogstad was appointed fylkesfører for Sør-Trøndelag. He was a pan-Germanist and helped the German occupational forces to make up lists of people that could be taken hostages during the martial law in Trondheim in 1942. Rogstad was appointed leader of the paramilitary organisation Hirden after its original leader Karl Marthinsen was assassinated in February 1945. In April of the same year he was also appointed chief of the police unit Statspolitiet.

In May 1945, Rogstad along with Jonas Lie and Sverre Riisnæs held up at the farm Skallum in Bærum. When the German capitulation was a fact he committed suicide by gunshot.
