= Julius Nielson =

German SS Officer

Julius Hans Christian Nielson
- Born: 26 October 1898; German Empire
- Died: 10 July 1948 (aged 49); Kristiansten Fortress, Norway
- Status: Executed by firing squad
- Conviction: War crimes
- Penalty: Death

Julius Hans Christian Nielson (26 October 1898 – July 10, 1948) was a German SS officer attached to the Gestapo. He was stationed in Norway during World War II and worked as the Commander of the Security Police and the SD in Trondheim. He was promoted to Obersturmführer. During his time in Trondheim, he tortured and murdered Norwegian prisoners.

== Execution ==
Nielson was convicted of murdering and torturing prisoners by the Frostating Court of Appeal. He was executed by an 11 man firing squad from 5 meters away at Kristiansten Fortress on July 10, 1948. Neilson was among 12 others who were convicted and executed for war crimes as a result of the legal purge in Norway.
