= Olav Aspheim =

Norwegian Nazi collaborator

- Born: 24 November 1921; Ringerike, Norway
- Died: 9 March 1948 (aged 26); Akershus Fortress, Norway
- Status: Executed by firing squad
- Conviction: Treason
- Penalty: Death
- Military career
- Allegiance: Nazi Germany
- Service years: 1943–1945
- Rank: SS and Statspolitiet officer
- Units: 5th SS Panzer Division Wiking; Statspolitiet, Oslo
- Conflicts: World War II

Olav Aspheim (24 November 1921 – 9 March 1948) was a Norwegian member of the fascist party Nasjonal Samling, volunteer front fighter for the 5th SS Panzer Division Wiking and Statspolitiet constable who was sentenced to death and shot after World War II.

From August 1944, he was a Statspolitiet constable in Oslo. He was among the Norwegians that on 9 February 1945 participated in a firing squad at the execution site of Akershus Fortress where twenty Norwegian resistance fighters were shot.

Aspheim was arrested after the war. During the post-war legal purge in Norway he was found guilty of crimes that included treason, bodily harm, maltreatment and wrongful execution. His case was confirmed by the Supreme Court on 27 February 1947, where he was sentenced to death. Aspheim was executed by firing squad at Akershus Fortress on 9 March 1948.
