= Hans Jakob Skaar Pedersen =

Norwegian jurist and Nazi police chief

- Pedersen's Nasjonal Samling ID photo
- Born: 30 December 1908; Stavanger, Norway
- Died: 30 March 1946 (aged 37); Sverresborg Fortress, Norway
- Status: Executed by firing squad
- Conviction: Treason
- Penalty: Death

Hans Jakob Skaar Pedersen (30 December 1908 – 30 March 1946) was a Norwegian police official and member of Nasjonal Samling who was sentenced to death for treason and executed in 1946.

He was born in Stavanger to pharmacist Henrik Bernhard Pedersen and Tyri Josefine Pedersen. He graduated as a jurist in 1941 and was first assigned a position in Torridal. In January 1942 he was appointed acting district sheriff in Avaldsnes Municipality and mayor of Kopervik and Stangaland Municipality. In 1943 he was appointed as a police officer for the Statspolitiet (State Police, STAPO) in Stavanger, and was eventually promoted police chief of the Stavanger district, which included Aust-Agder, Vest-Agder, Rogaland, and parts of Hordaland counties.

In the legal purge he was tried for threats against prominent citizens (including priests and barristers), and several incidents of torture and maltreatment. Pedersen was sentenced to death by the Supreme Court of Norway in March 1946, and executed by firing squad at Sverresborg, Bergen, on 30 March.
