= Holger Tou =

Norwegian police officer (1919–1947)

- Born: 1 March 1919; Stavanger, Norway
- Died: 30 January 1947 (aged 27); Sverresborg Fortress, Bergen, Norway
- Status: Executed by firing squad
- Conviction: Treason
- Penalty: Death
- Military career
- Allegiance: Nazi Germany
- Service years: 1940–1945
- Rank: Norwegian Police, SS and Statspolitiet officer
- Units: Norwegian Police Service; SS Division Wiking; Statspolitiet
- Conflicts: World War II

Holger Tou (1 March 1919 – 30 January 1947) was a Norwegian police official and member of the fascist party Nasjonal Samling since before World War II, who was sentenced to death in 1946 and executed in 1947. He was born in Stavanger. During the occupation of Norway by Nazi Germany he was hired as a police officer by the regular Norwegian police in 1940. For a time he served as a volunteer in the 5th SS Panzer Division Wiking, before he was back in the police as a police officer in Stavanger in 1942. He was then loaned to the Statspolitiet and was involved in several operations cooperating with the German Sicherheitspolizei. Tou became a full-time employee for Statspolitiet in February 1945.

In the legal purge, he was sentenced to death for murder, torture, bodily harm, aggravated assault with dangerous tools and maltreatment of his own countrymen by the Supreme Court of Norway 6 September 1946. Tou was executed by firing squad at Sverresborg Fortress in Bergen 30 January 1947.
