= Einar Dønnum =

Norwegian Nazi collaborator

- Dønnum during his trial (19 January 1947)
- Born: 19 April 1897; Oslo, Norway
- Died: 22 April 1947 (aged 50); Akershus Fortress, Norway
- Political party: Nasjonal Samling
- Status: Executed by firing squad
- Conviction: Treason
- Penalty: Death

Einar Olav Christiansen Dønnum (19 April 1897 – 22 April 1947) was a Norwegian Nazi collaborator who was executed during the legal purge in Norway after World War II.

== Early life ==
Before the war, Einar was a manager and Sunday school teacher at a church. He worked there for 8 years before being forced to quit. Einar had been unfaithful to his wife and initiated a sexual relationship with a 17-year-old girl. Outside the church he ran a scrap shop, buying and selling used clothes.

When the Nazi occupied Norway, Einar became a member of Nasjonal Samling on November 1, 1940. After a few weeks at the Order Police in Oslo, Einar came to the surveillance department, a unit that was a kind of forerunner of the State Police.

== World War II ==
During the occupation of Norway by Nazi Germany, Einar became a member of Nasjonal Samling on November 1, 1940. The following year, he began as a temporary police constable. Einar joined the Statspolitiet in 1941.

Einar was known for brutal interrogation methods, which included torture. He hired his teenage son, Ole Bernhard Dønnum, as an assistant. In addition to torturing resistance fighters, Einar also participated in several executions of them. Members of the Norwegian resistance movement, including Asbjørn Sunde, made several failed assassination attempts on Einar. Near the end of the war, Einar's name became synonymous with torture.

In May 1945, Einar fled with his son to Sweden. They were both arrested there, and extradited to Norway in July 1945. The two were tried for treason. Einar faced underlying charges of assault, torture, and murder, but Ole only faced underlying charges of torture. During his trial, Einar tried to portray himself as an insignificant figure who had not done anything particularly serious.

Both Dønnums were found guilty. Einar was sentenced to death and Ole was sentenced to six years in prison with hard labour. Einar was executed by firing squad at Akershus Fortress on 22 April 1947. Ole Dønnum was released from prison on 18 December 1948, and changed his name after his release.
