= Arne Saatvedt =

Arne Braa Saatvedt
- Born: 18 June 1922; Meråker Municipality, Norway
- Died: 20 October 1945 (aged 23); Akershus Fortress, Oslo, Norway
- Status: Executed by firing squad
- Conviction: Treason
- Penalty: Death
- Military career
- Allegiance: Nazi Germany
- Service years: 1941–1945
- Rank: SS and Statspolitiet officer
- Units: 5th SS Panzer Division Wiking; 23. SS-Panzergrenadierregiment Norge; Statspolitiet
- Conflicts: World War II

Arne Braa Saatvedt (18 June 1922 – 20 October 1945) was a Norwegian police official and member of the fascist party Nasjonal Samling who was sentenced to death and executed in 1945.

Saatvedt was born in Meråker Municipality in Nord-Trøndelag county. When he was 19, he volunteered the 5th SS Panzer Division Wiking and 23. SS-Panzergrenadierregiment Norge. He joined the Statspolitiet in 1943, and served as interpreter and investigator at the German Sicherheitspolizei in Lillehammer.

In the post-war legal purge, Saatvedt was sentenced to death on 14 August 1945, by Eidsivating Court of Appeal for illegal detention, torture, bodily harm, aggravated assault with dangerous tools and maltreatment of his own countrymen. Arne Braa Saatvedt was executed by firing squad at Akershus Fortress on 20 October 1945.
