= Reidar Haaland =

Norwegian police officer (1919–1945)

- Haaland during his trial in July 1945
- Born: 21 February 1919; Stavanger, Norway
- Died: 17 August 1945 (aged 26); Akershus Fortress, Norway
- Status: Executed by firing squad
- Conviction: Treason
- Penalty: Death

Reidar Haaland (21 February 1919 – 17 August 1945) was a police officer and Waffen-SS member.

He hailed from Stavanger. He was a member of Nasjonal Samling from 6 December 1940, and on 20 June 1941 he joined Den Norske Legion. The legion became defunct in 1943, whereupon Haaland found work in Statspolitiet in Oslo. In the autumn of 1943 he was transferred to Gestapo.

Haaland was tried and found guilty of treason, torture, maltreatment and aggravated assault with a dangerous tool. He became the first Norwegian to receive the death sentence by the Supreme Court of Norway during the post-World War II trials. Haaland was executed by firing squad on 17 August 1945 at Akershus Fortress, Oslo.
