= Ole Wehus =

Norwegian police officer (1909–1947)

- Born: 25 June 1909; Kristiansand, Norway
- Died: 10 March 1947 (aged 37); Akershus Fortress, Oslo, Norway
- Status: Executed by firing squad
- Conviction: Treason
- Penalty: Death
- Military career
- Allegiance: Nazi Germany
- Service years: 1942–1945
- Rank: Norwegian STAPO (police) officer/Gestapo agent
- Unit: STAPO 1942–1945
- Conflicts: World War II

Ole Wehus (25 June 1909 – 10 March 1947) was a Norwegian police official and member of the fascist party Nasjonal Samling who was sentenced to death and executed in 1947.

== Life and career ==
Wehus was born in Kristiansand on 25 June 1909. During the occupation of Norway by Nazi Germany he was appointed as a police officer for the Statspolitiet (State Police, STAPO) from the spring of 1942 until the end of the war. He served most of the period in Kristiansand, where he cooperated with the Gestapo at their local headquarters, known as Arkivet.

In the legal purge after the war, he was tried for 48 accounts of torture and maltreatment of his own countrymen, often in a more brutal way than he was ordered. He was also found guilty of two counts of complicity to murder. Wehus was sentenced to death by the Supreme Court of Norway for treason in February 1947, and executed by firing squad at Akershus Fortress on 10 March the same year.
