= Lippestad =

Lippestad is a Norwegian surname. Notable people with the surname include:

- Geir Lippestad (born 1964) – Norwegian lawyer, politician, and social activist
- Johan Andreas Lippestad (1902–1961) – Norwegian government minister

== See also ==
- Lippstadt
- Lipstadt
