= Skallum =

Area of Bærum, Norway

Coordinates: 59.9108°N 10.5920°E

Skallum is an area at Stabekk in Bærum, Norway. It was named after the historic estate Skallum (Skallum Gård). It is known locally for its art gallery and as a recreational area, and nationally as the site of an event in the closing days of World War II in Europe.

== Geography ==
The area is located north of the commercial centre at Stabekk, but slightly south of Stabekk Primary School and the former college at Ringstabekk. Skallum distinguished from the surrounding area as it forms a small valley, a creek having run here in the past. The creek was a part of the Stabekk Watershed, which originated north of Øvrevoll Galloppbane and ran southwards via Voll, Jar, Jarmyra, Tjernsrud and Ringstabekk. The creek dropped into the valley as a waterfall right after crossing what today is the road Gamle Ringeriksvei. The part of the creek that flowed into the Skallum area was named Skallumbekken. After Skallum it continued (under the name Stabekk) to the southeast, across Stabekk farm and Ballerud, before turning northeast and then south, before reaching its mouth at Holtekilen.

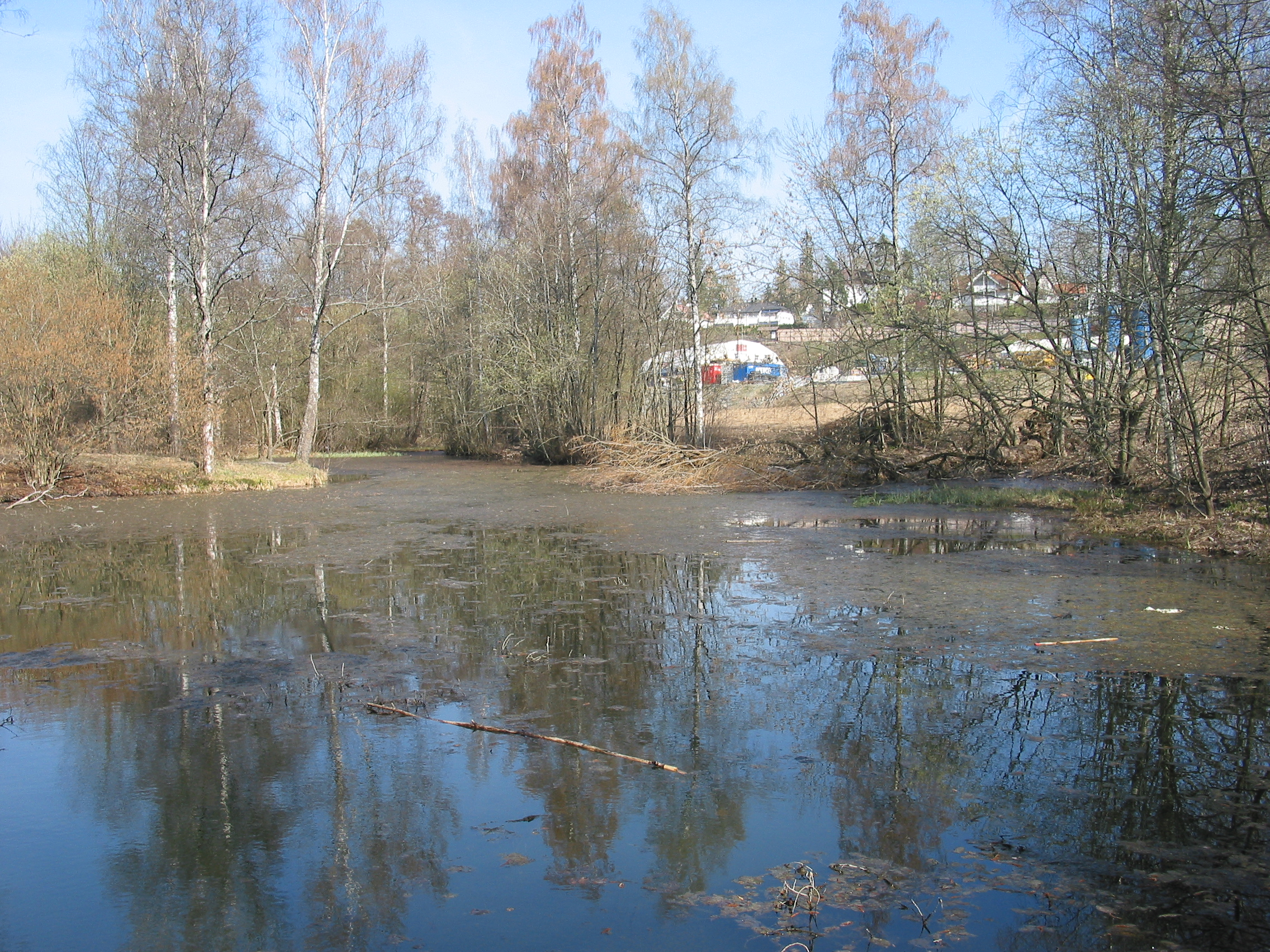
Egerdammen.

Somewhat north of Skallum farm is found the pond Egerdammen. It is named after a former owner, who most likely created the lake some time before 1900, damming up Skallumbekken. Today, this pond is the only trace of a waterway at Skallum, as most of the Stabekk Watershed has been led underground through a pipe system. The lake is rich on biological life, and has been used as an ice skating rink during the winter.

== History ==
The name has also been written Skjelme, but both names stem from the same root. The name of the area is taken from the farm Skallum, to which Stabekk is sometimes suffixed (Skallum-Stabekk). Historic spellings of the farm name include Skalmestadbeck (1617); in 1723 Skallum-Stabæk was registered.

The Øverland family then owned the farm between 1685 and 1812. It received a matricule number in 1826, and at that time a horse, two sheep and two cattle were held there. Since 1889 the farm is owned by the Eger family, among others the industrialist Conrad Wilhelm Eger. An adjacent street was named after him a few years before his death.

== Skallum Manor ==
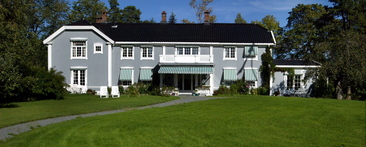
Skallum Manor

During the Middle Ages, the farm was owned by Hovedøya Monastery before the Reformation of 1536, and thereafter by the Crown. Skallum was church property until the Protestant Reformation and then became crown property. Most of the farm buildings that exist today were raised in the late 1880s and early 1900s. The manor house, dating from the late 1600s, was extended and received a Swiss style facade during the 1880s. Since 1982, the former manor house has been used us an art gallery, Galleri Skaugum.

=== Events of 1945 ===
During the German occupation of Norway, which started in 1940, Conrad Wilhelm Eger owned Skallum. When he was forced into exile in 1944, the Nazi authorities requisitioned the property. It was used by the Hird, and sports official and judge Egil Reichborn-Kjennerud lived there. The Nazi authorities had already set up an anti-air battery, named Grossbatterie Bertha, on a field south of Skallum.

When the Nazis were ousted from power on 8 May 1945, a group of Nazis entrenched themselves at Skallum, reportedly against the orders of Vidkun Quisling. Quisling and his followers had barricaded themselves at his home Gimle at Bygdøy, but the Nazi government had been torn apart in the late days of World War II. On 8 May, Minister of Justice Sverre Riisnæs was picked up in a car by a helper of Minister of the Police Jonas Lie, and they drove to Skallum. In addition to Reichborn-Kjennerud and Lie, police leaders Egil Olbjørn and Henrik Rogstad were present, in addition to lower-rank police officers and SS members. On the other hand, a group of police that included Erling Søvik, labelled by historian Nils Johan Ringdal as more "opportunist", were not present.

Resistance members from the Home Front had already begun surrounding the farm. Olbjørn, Reichborn-Kjennerud and others left by bus, leaving only Riisnæs, Lie and Rogstad. At one point, the three left the building to negotiate with the resistance members, but this did not bear fruit, and as such they resumed the entrenchment. On 10 May the group was "requested to leave the farm". The situation was becoming desperate. Jonas Lie was high on pills and alcohol, and was reported to have fired a gun in the direction of Riisnæs and Rogstad, as well as threatening them with an unsafe hand grenade.

On 11 May, the entrenchment was brought to an end. Sverre Riisnæs surrendered, approaching the resistance forces while flying a white handkerchief, whereas Lie and Rogstad were found dead. A suicide note was later found, signed by all three, but only Rogstad actually committed suicide—Lie is believed to have died from intoxication and stress.

== Transportation ==
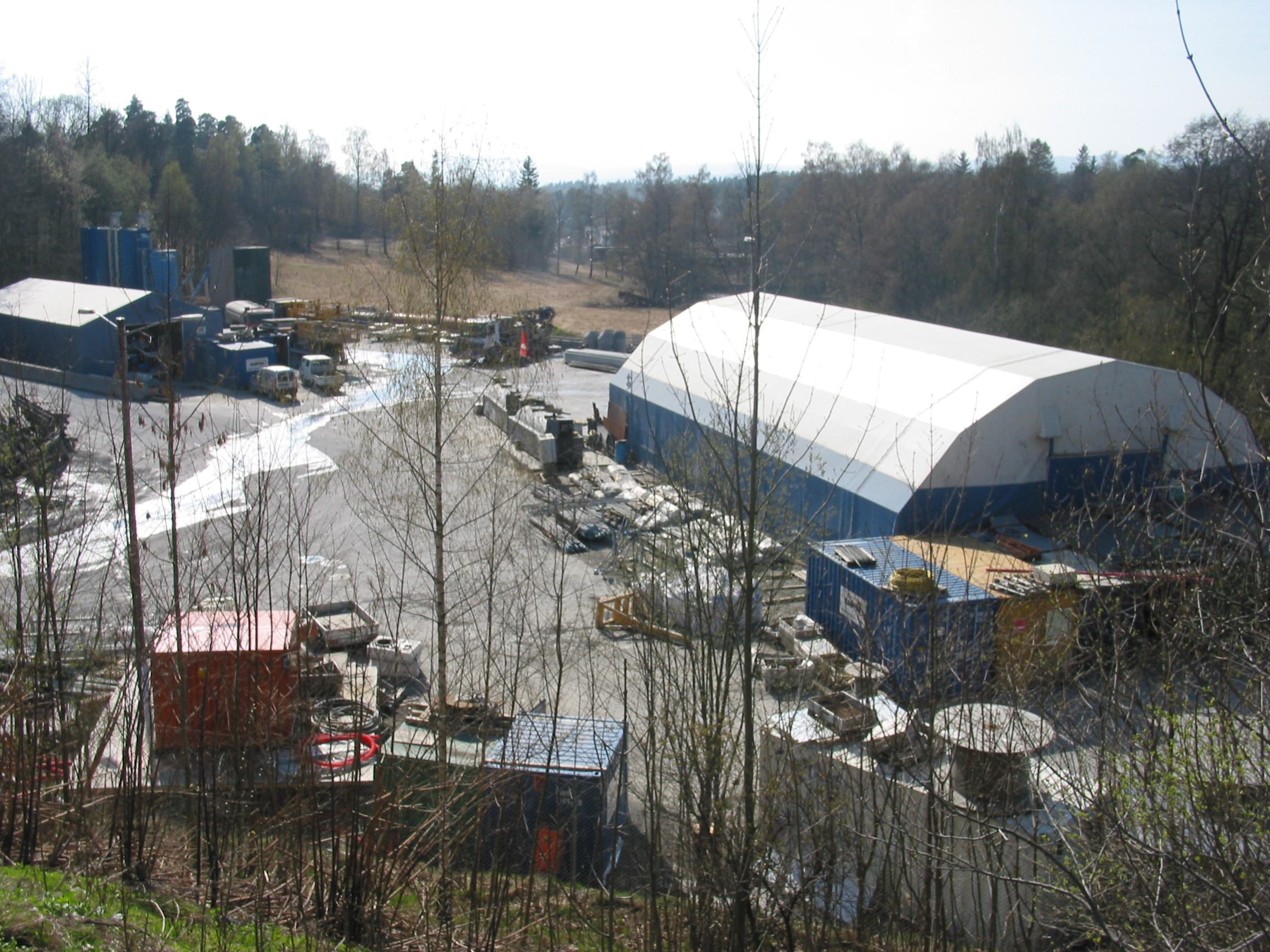
Tunnel excavation site, with the fields in the background.

Skallum is used as an excavation location of the Bærum Tunnel. It is one of three such locations, the other two being at Engervannet and at Fossveien near Haslum. Construction started in 2007.

In terms of public transportation, Skallum is served by the lines 143 and 733 of the Ruter bus network; the bus station is named Skogveien. Also, Skallum is within walking distance of Bekkestua metro station and Stabekk railway station.
