= Sverre Riisnæs =

Norwegian jurist and public prosecutor

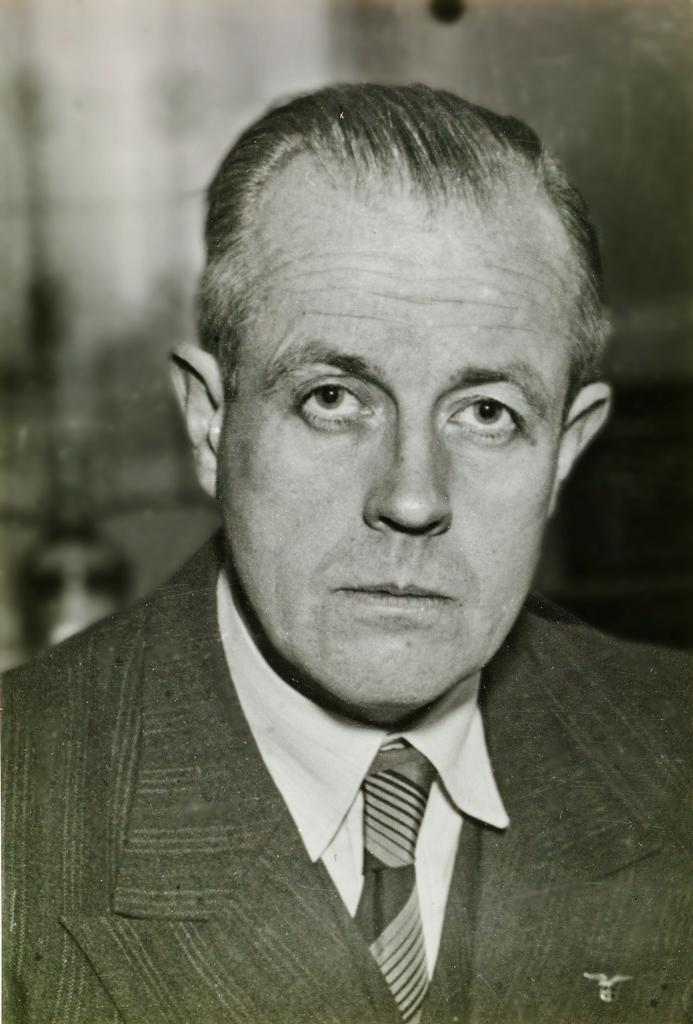
- Riisnæs during World War II

Minister of Justice (National Government)
- In office 25 September 1941 – 8 May 1945
- Reichskommissar: Josef Terboven
- Minister President: Vidkun Quisling
- Preceded by: Office established
- Succeeded by: Office abolished

Personal details
- Born: Sverre Parelius Riisnæs; November 6, 1897 Vik, Sogn og Fjordane, Sweden–Norway
- Died: June 21, 1988 (aged 90) Oslo, Norway
- Party: Nasjonal Samling
- Occupation: Lawyer, politician

Military service
- Allegiance: Nazi Germany
- Branch/service: Schutzstaffel
- Rank: Standartenführer
- Unit: Germanske SS Norge
- Battles/wars: World War II
- Awards: War Merit Cross, 2nd class with Swords

Sverre Parelius Riisnæs (6 November 1897 – 21 June 1988) was a Norwegian collaborationist Minister of Justice in the government of Vidkun Quisling in occupied Norway during World War II, and a Standartenführer (Colonel) in the Schutzstaffel.. Before collaberating with the Nazis he was a lawyer and public prosecutor. As a Nazi he was a member of Nasjonal Samling.

== Pre-war career ==
Riisnæs grew up in a nationalist and pro-German household in Sogn. He received a degree in law from the University of Kristiania in 1919, then worked for three years as a junior prosecutor in Sunnmøre and Sogn, followed by twelve years as a junior police prosecutor, initially in Kristiansund, and from 1925 in Oslo. From 1934 he worked as a district prosecutor in Buskerud and Oppland.

Riisnæs, who held contacts in the international policing community, is credited with introducing new investigative techniques, such as the use of police dogs, to Norway. In 1936, Riisnæs was prosecutor in the case against Per Imerslund and other Norwegian Nazis who had broken into the home where Leon Trotsky had been staying in exile, which resulted in Trotsky's deportation from Norway to Mexico. Riisnæs was a supporter of Adolf Hitler, but broke all contact with his German friends when he was appointed by Parliament in January 1940 to investigate German espionage in Norway.

== Wartime collaborationist minister ==
At the onset of Germany's occupation of Norway in April 1940, Riisnæs initially attempted to flee the country, fearing retribution from Norwegian Nazis over his role as prosecutor in the 1936 Trotsky case. After reconsideration he remained in Norway, offering his services to Nasjonal Samling and joining the party in 1940. He was one of eleven councillors of state from Nasjonal Samling appointed by Josef Terboven on 25 September 1940, tasked with heading the Ministry of Justice. On the one-year anniversary of their appointments, Riisnæs and the other councillors of state were given the title of Ministers by Terboven.

After two years of direct civilian administration by the Germans, Riisnæs was one of nine Norwegians signing the declaration on 31 January 1942 which disbanded Parliament and directed Quisling to formally take over the powers of government. As Minister of Justice, Riisnæs was responsible for changing the Norwegian legal system to legitimize the Nazi actions, and authorized the persecution of those who would not cooperate with the German occupiers. Riisnæs was a driving force in the deportations of Norwegian Jews, which primarily took place in the fall of 1942. While his earlier writings primarily consisted of legal and forensic texts, he produced a number of books and articles expressing his Nazi convictions during the war, and also held public speeches against Norwegian Jews.

Riisnæs was a strong proponent of the Germanic SS in Norway, and himself served as a Standartenführer in the SS for some time. He supported Norwegian volunteer participation on the Eastern Front; in January 1944, he proposed mobilizing 75 000 Norwegian men to fight against the Soviet Army in the Continuation War in Finland, but this did not materialize. Following the assassination of Karl Marthinsen, head of Statspolitiet, by the resistance group Milorg in February 1945, Riisnæs advocated for harsh reprisals, and is mentioned as personally having participated in the subsequent executions.

== After World War II ==
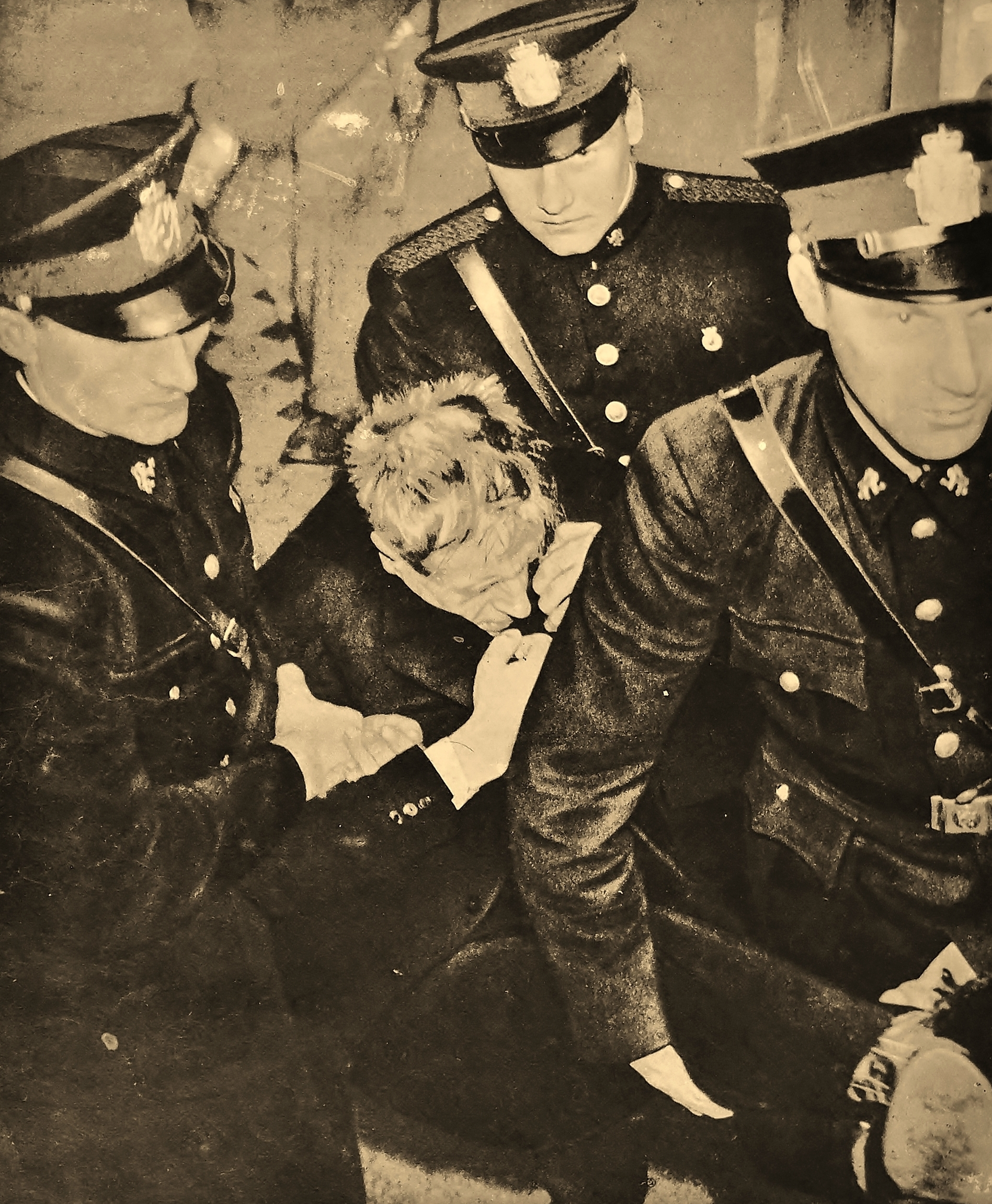
Riisnæs being carried into court by police officers for his trial in 1947

After the collapse of the Quisling government at the end of the war, Jonas Lie, Henrik Rogstad, and Riisnæs retreated to a farm in Skallum near Bærum outside Oslo. Surrounded by forces of the Norwegian resistance movement, Lie died probably of natural causes and Rogstad committed suicide. Riisnæs surrendered without a struggle.

Riisnæs was charged with treason in 1947, but his trial was put on hold based on the defence that he was mentally ill, and finally statute-barred in 1973. From 1948 to 1960, Riisnæs was hospitalized in Reitgjerdet Psychiatric Hospital in Trondheim. To this day, there are questions whether he feigned mental weakness. In 1974 he emigrated to Sicily, Italy, and later to Vienna, but returned to Oslo in 1985, where he lived for three years in a nursing home until his death. Shortly before his death Riisnæs agreed to an interview by the NRK, where he continued to express admiration for Quisling.

== Literature ==
- N.J. Ringdal, Gal mann til rett tid: NS-minister Sverre Riisnæs, en psykobiografi (Oslo: Aschehoug, 1989) ISBN 82-03-16110-3 (in Norwegian)
