= Lèse-majesté in Norway =

Lèse majesté in Norway (Norwegian: majestetsfornærmelse, majestetsforbrytelse, crimen (læsæ) majestatis, etc.) was judicially based and defined in Norway's 1902 Penal Code, which provided fines or prison for this crime. Often related to political conflicts, accusations of lèse majesté were frequent in the 17th, 18th, and 19th centuries, and many cases resulted in execution. Virtually no legal actions have been taken after 1905. The last to be charged for lèse majesté was a man who attacked Queen Elizabeth II with a tomato during her state visit in 1981. As of 2015, lèse majesté is no longer a criminal offence in Norway.

== Laws ==
=== Current law ===
On 1 October 2015, the 2005 Penal Code entered into effect, after which lèse majesté is no longer a criminal offence.

The 1814 Constitution of the Kingdom of Norway states in article 5 that the King's person is holy and that he may not be blamed or accused.

=== Former laws ===
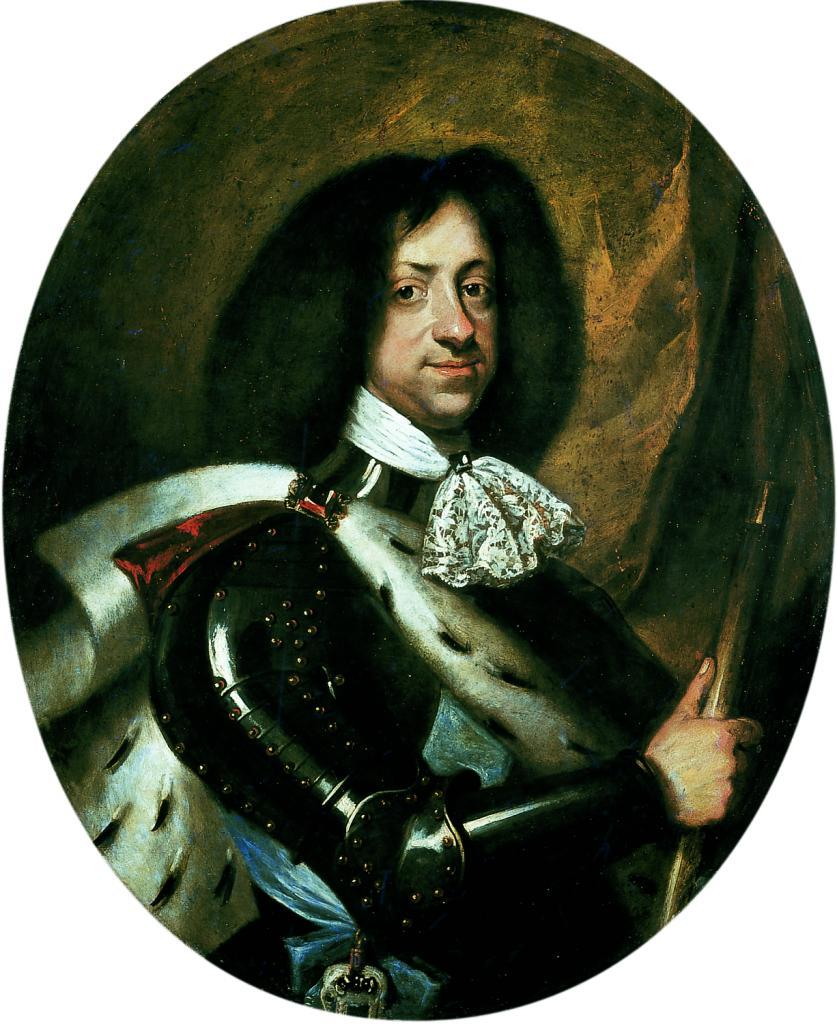
King Christian V's Norwegian Law of 1687 provided, alike older and newer laws, capital punishment for lèse majesté

According to the 1902 Penal Code, article 100, a person should be punished with 21 years of prison if he causes, attempts to cause or contributes to the death of the King or of the Regent.

Article 101 said: "If any defamation is exercised against the King or the Regent, the guilty is punished with a fine or up to five years of prison."

Article 102 provided similar protection to other members of the Royal House.

Article 103 stated that prosecutions demand either the command or the acceptance of the King.

According to article 96, foreign heads of state enjoyed, on certain conditions and when visiting or staying in the Kingdom, protection against lèse majesté.

Articles 100-102 were amended in 1981. Article 103 has remained the same since 1902. The 1902 penal code was gradually replaced by the 2005 penal code.

The 1842 Penal Code contained provisions concerning "violations of the body or the health" of (article 9–13) the King, (article 9–17) the Queen consort, the Queen dowager, and the Royal Princes and Princesses. The punishment was lifetime slavery or capital punishment.

King Christian V's Norwegian Law of 1687, article 6–4–1, stated:

Who to [the Majesties'] disgrace accuse the King or the Queen, or attracts their or their children's life, has forfeited honour, life, and estate, the right hand to be cut off him alive. The body is parted and placed on the breaking wheel, and the head together with the hand are placed on a stake. If the malefactor gets away and cannot suffer on his body, then the punishment shall be done on a picture or an imitation of him. If the malefactor is of the nobility or higher estate, then his arms shall be destroyed by the executioner, and all his heirs of the body lose their estate [i.e. noble status] and stem [i.e. ancestry].

== Mediaeval cases (872–1537) ==
=== Case of False Margaret (1301) ===
In 1301, a woman arrived at Bergen, Norway in a ship from Lübeck, Germany, claiming to be Margaret, and accused several people of treason. She claimed that she had not died in Orkney, but sent to Germany, where she had married. The people of Bergen and some of the clergy there supported her claim, even though the late King Eirik II had identified his dead daughter's body, and even though the woman appeared to be about 40 years old, whereas the real Margaret would have been 17. She was burned at the stake for treason at Nordnes in Bergen in 1301, and her husband was beheaded.

=== Case of Baron Audun Hugleiksson (1302) ===
In 1299, Baron Audun Hugleiksson was arrested. He was imprisoned for three years, until he was sentenced to death late in the year 1302, and all his estates were seized and placed under the king. He was hanged on 2 December 1302, the first Sunday in Advent. Hanging was considered the most humiliating of all methods of execution in the Middle Ages. It is clear that Audun was convicted of what was considered a direct crime against the king. At the same time, it is not stated anywhere what was the cause of the death sentence. Presumably he was considered a political opponent by the new king, and he therefore had to be cleared of the way. Political executions were not an unknown phenomenon in Europe at this time.

== Denmark-Norway (1537–1814) ==
=== Case of Lykke (1661) ===
In 1661, Danish nobleman Kai Lykke wrote a letter to Corfitz Ulfeld in which he accused Queen Sophie Amalie of Denmark and Norway of sleeping together with her servants. The letter's content was presented to King Frederick III of Denmark and Norway, and Lykke confessed it. Few months later, he went into exile. The King initiated a trial in which Lykke was found guilty, and he was sentenced to forfeit honour, life, and estate. As Lykke had escaped and could not be executed, an imitational doll was made for and used in a ceremony where it got its right hand cut off and thereafter was beheaded. Also Lykke's coat of arms was destroyed. His large estates were confiscated by the Crown.

=== Case of Count Griffenfeld (1676) ===
In 1676, Danish and Norwegian count Peder Schumacher Griffenfeld was accused of and sentenced for lèse majesté and other crimes. Bearing his destroyed coat of arms, Griffenfeld was transported to the place of execution. However, just seconds before the sword was to behead Griffenfeld, an officer acting on behalf of King Christian V of Denmark and Norway shouted "Stop, it is pardon!", whereafter his sentence was changed to lifetime prison.

=== Case of Juel (1723) ===
In 1723, Povel Juel was executed at the New Square in Copenhagen after having been sentenced on King Christian V's Danish Law of 1683, articles 6-4-1 and 6-4-2. His alleged contribution to possible occupation of Denmark and Norway was considered an attack on the King rather than on the two countries.

=== Case of Count Struensee and Count Brandt (1772) ===
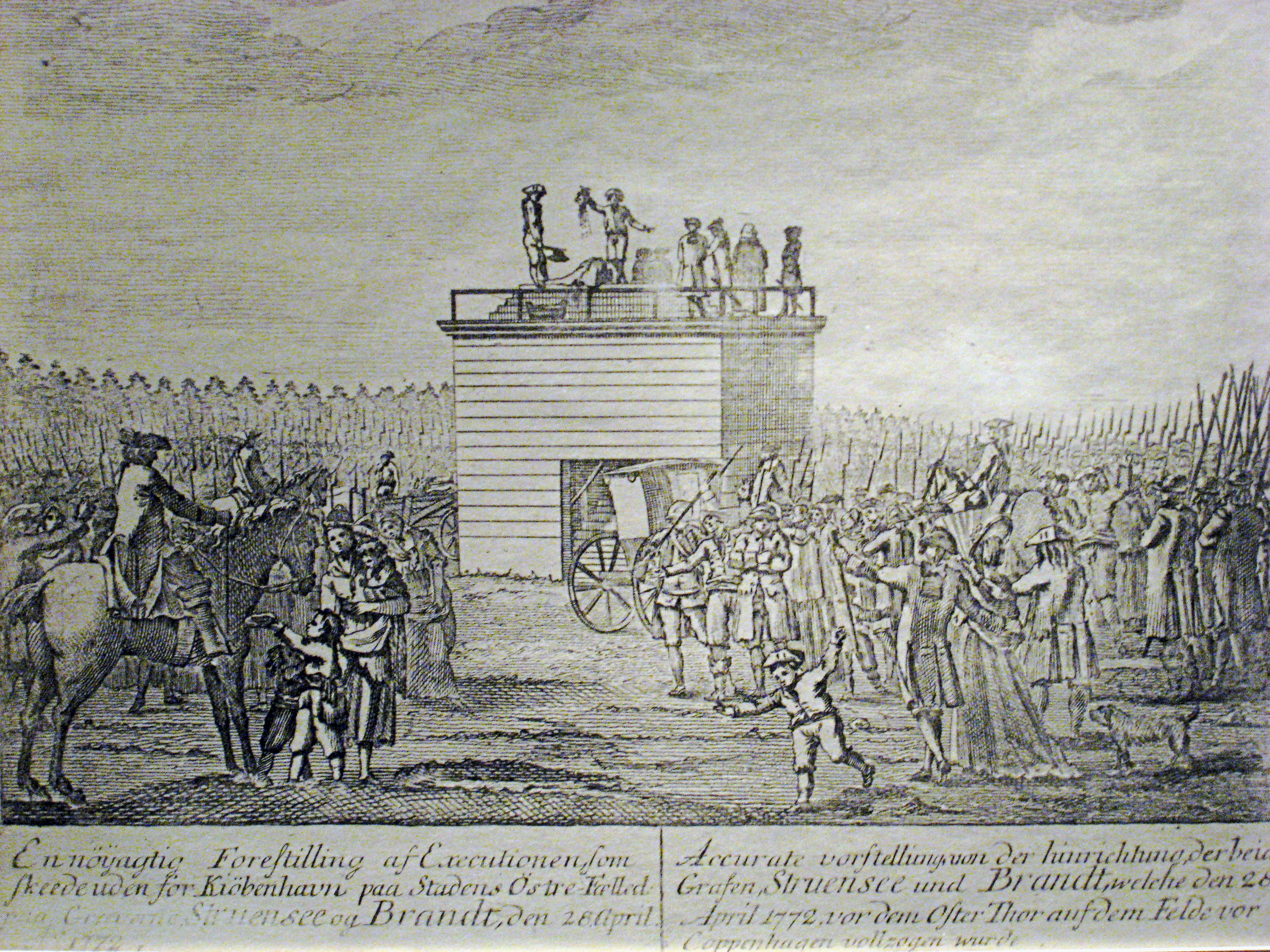
Contemporary depiction of ex-counts Struensee and Brandt being executed

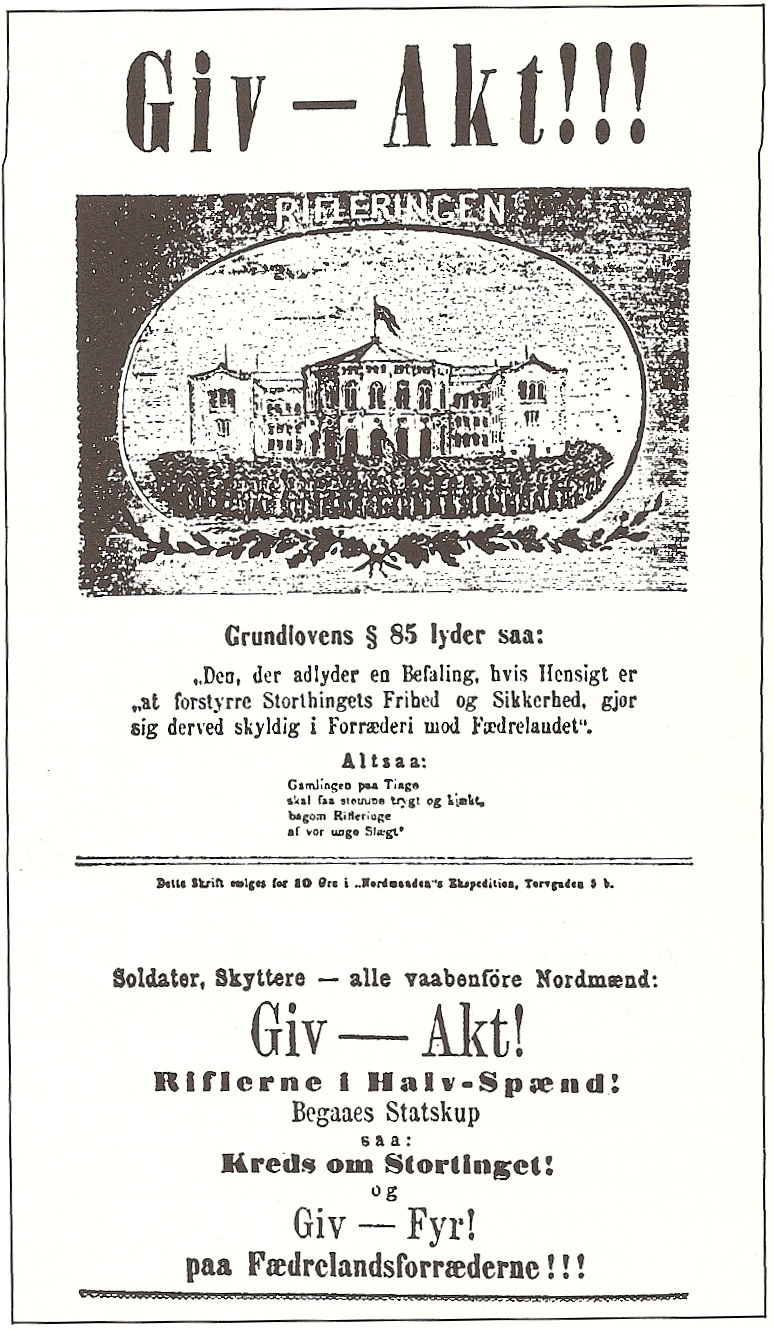
Front cover of Rifleringen

A famous case of lèse majesté is that of Count Johann Friedrich Struensee and Count Enevold Brandt, who in 1772 were accused of and sentenced for this and several other crimes, whereafter they were executed by beheading and placed on the breaking wheel.

=== Case of Heiberg (1799) ===
In 1799, the Danish Chancery initiated a process against Dano-Norwegian man Peter Andreas Heiberg, whom they accused of lèse majesté and whom Crown Prince Frederick of Denmark and Norway—the real initiator of the process—considered a troublesome political opponent. The Crown Prince wrote in a letter of 24 July that he considered Heiberg's magazine "exceedingly shameless". In a letter of 21 August, the Crown Prince wrote in general that "no mercy" was to be shown and that "fear has to be chased into these humans". He suggested that the Chancery initiate a trial and subsequently execute them. However, the Chancery considered that popular opinion in Denmark and Norway made an execution of Heiberg too dangerous. Instead, he was banished from the Kingdoms. Heiberg settled in Paris, where he lived until his death in 1841.

=== Case of Lysne (1803) ===
In 1803, having led a group of Lærdal farmers who claimed to be exempt from compulsory military service, farmer Anders Lysne was executed by beheading. Refusing to obey the King's commands was considered treason against the country: in an absolute monarchy, this was in practise equal to treason against the King himself, i.e. lèse majesté.

== Sweden-Norway (1814–1905) ==
=== Case of Hielm (1825) ===
Det norske Nationalblad (1815–1822; English: The Norwegian National Magazine) was an oppositional magazine in Oslo. Through its publishers, the magazine was involved in a case of lèse majesté, after which it lost its postage reduction, forcing it to shut down. In 1825, one of the said publishers, Jonas Anton Hielm, was sentenced to pay a fine of 500 speciedaler.

=== Case of Løberg (1878) ===
In 1878, Member of Parliament Hjalmar Løberg was sentenced for lèse majesté because of an article, published in the magazine Hardangeren, where he claimed that King Oscar II of Sweden and Norway had political motivations for giving a medal to a specific member of parliament.

=== Case of Hol (1884) ===
In 1884, Jon Gundersen Hol was arrested, accused of lèse majesté in his pamphlet Rifleringen (English: The Ring of Rifles). The pamphlet, published on 6 February, called upon semi-military personnel and other civilians possessing weapons to encircle and protect the Parliament in the case a coup d'état, thereby indirectly accusing King Oscar II of having such plans. On 8 February, samples of the pamphlet were confiscated by the police, and at the same time, the printer Nikolai Olsen was arrested. The apprehension of Jon Hol followed on 10 February. He remained in custody until 26 February, and on 11 May, he was charged for lèse majesté. Bjørnstjerne Bjørnson and Lars Holst faced the same charge. However, proceedings were stayed after the fall of the conservative government of Christian Selmer.

== Independence (1905–present) ==
=== 1981 case ===
In 1981, a protesting punk was charged with lèse majesté for throwing a tomato at, but failing to hit, Queen Elizabeth II, who was in Oslo during her second state visit to Norway.

== See also ==
- Lèse majesté
- Monarchy of Norway
