= Ragnar Skancke =

Norwegian politician (1890–1948)

Ragnar Sigvald Skancke
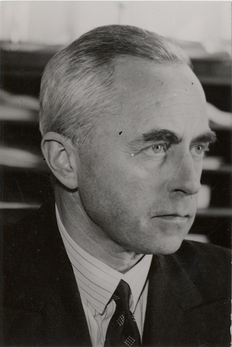

Minister for Church and Educational Affairs
- In office 1 February 1942 – 8 May 1945

Minister for Church and Educational Affairs
- In office 25 September 1941 – 1 February 1942

Provisional NS Councillor of State for Church and Educational Affairs
- In office 25 September 1940 – 25 September 1941

Minister of Labour (did not take office)
- In office 9 April 1940 – 15 April 1940

Personal details
- Born: 9 November 1890 Ås, Norway
- Died: 28 August 1948 (aged 57) Akershus Fortress, Oslo, Norway
- Cause of death: Execution by firing squad
- Party: Nasjonal Samling
- Profession: Professor of electrical engineering

Ragnar Sigvald Skancke (9 November 1890 – 28 August 1948) was the Norwegian Minister for Church and Educational Affairs. He served in Vidkun Quisling's Nasjonal Samling government during World War II. Executed by firing squad, he remains the last person to receive capital punishment in Norway.

Prior to the start of World War II, Skancke was a professor of electrical engineering at the Norwegian Institute of Technology in Trondheim. He was also a member of the Royal Norwegian Society of Sciences and Letters.

== Pre-war life ==
Skancke was born in Ås, Norway, on 9 November 1890 to Johan Skancke and Kari Busvold. In 1913 he gained a Bachelor of Engineering in Karlsruhe, Germany.

Skancke worked as a docent at the Norwegian Institute of Technology in Trondheim from 1913 to 1918. He then spent the next five years as a supervising engineer at the telecommunication company Elektrisk Bureau. In 1923 Skancke became a professor at the Norwegian Institute of Technology, a position he would hold for the remainder of his life.

He married Ingrid Aas (born 1888) in 1927.

== World War II collaboration ==
=== Political positions ===
==== April 1940 "coup" government ====
Skancke was assigned his first political position as Minister of Labour by Vidkun Quisling during Norway's "coup" government. For 6 days following the German invasion on 9 April, Quisling would make a series of broadcasts using Norwegian radio (NRK) during which he announced Skancke as the Minister of Labour. Skancke heard of his appointment while teaching at the Norwegian Institute of Technology in Trondheim, and was never formally offered the position. He reacted with opposition to Quisling's attempt to form a government and refused to assume the position given to him.

==== Terboven council and NS government ====
On 25 September 1940, a council of Norwegian ministers were selected by Reichskommissar Josef Terboven to assist him in governing the country. Terboven, the leading civilian German leader in occupied Norway, offered Skancke the position of Councillor of State for Church and Educational Affairs. This position was accepted by Skancke who also assumed the title of Minister for Church and Educational Affairs exactly a year later.

=== Acts during war ===
During his collaborationist work in occupied Norway, Skancke aligned the Norwegian Church and school system with Vidkun Quisling's National socialist agenda. He removed bishops, priests and teachers opposed to National socialist teachings and confiscated books by authors who were against the Nasjonal Samling political party.. Despite refusing to contribute to Nazification himself, Skancke ordered Norwegian teachers and school children to attend Hitler Youth exhibitions which caused the first school strike of the German occupation. On many occasions Skancke resisted German authority because it conflicted with his own convictions. He felt strongly that Finnmark teachers should not be deported even if they refused to institute new National socialist teaching programmes. On 5 July 1941, he resisted an order from Reichskommissar Terboven to send Norwegian church bells to Germany for war industry smelting. The case was dragged out by Skancke until it was handed over to minister of trade Eivind Blehr in 1942. Blehr also refused to release the bells, leading to several confrontations with Terboven during which the Germans were persuaded to drop the demands.

== Post-war conviction and execution ==
=== Trials ===
Following the May 1945 German capitulation in Norway, Skancke was put on trial for treason. He was convicted and sentenced to death in 1946. In March 1947, the Norwegian Supreme Court rejected Skancke's appeals and confirmed the sentence. In response to the confirmation of his sentence, Skancke attempted to get a retrial, presenting new evidence and witness testimonies. During this process, the mood in Norway largely changed with many calls for clemency for the former collaborationist minister.

=== Execution ===
All calls for clemency were ultimately rejected and Skancke was executed by firing squad at Akershus Fortress on 28 August 1948. He became the last person to be executed in Norway, who has since abolished capital punishment for all crimes. Before his execution, the Norwegian High Court had received letters from 668 priests who asked for mercy on Skancke's behalf. Ragnar Skancke was one of only three Norwegian Nazi leaders to be executed for political crimes in the post-war legal purge. Others executed include Vidkun Quisling and Internal affairs minister Albert Viljam Hagelin. All 34 other Norwegian and German war criminals were executed in the post war process due to convictions of murder, torture or systematic informing.

== Published works ==
In addition to professional works on electrical engineering in the 1930s, Skancke also wrote a book on Vidkun Quisling.

- Theorie der Wechselstrommaschinen mit e. Einl. in d. Theorie d. stationären Wechselströme nach O. S. Bragstad, J. Springer, Berlin 1932 (in German)
- Über ultraakustische Schwingungen in zylindrischen Stäben, Brun, Trondheim 1935 (in German)
- Boken om Vidkun Quisling, Blix, Oslo 1941 (in Norwegian)
- Ein Buch über Vidkun Quisling, Blix, Oslo 1941 (German translation) (in German)
