= Lipstadt =

Lipstadt is a surname. Notable people with the surname include:

- Aaron Lipstadt (born 1952), American director and producer
- Deborah Lipstadt (born 1947), American professor

== See also ==
- Lippestad
- Lippstadt
