= Johan Andreas Lippestad =

Norwegian politician

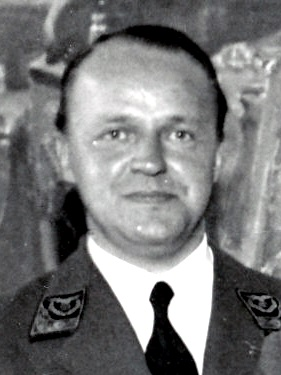
- Johan Andreas Lippestad

Personal details
- Born: 19 December 1902 Kristiania (now Oslo), Norway
- Died: 7 November 1961 (aged 58) Oslo
- Party: Nasjonal Samling
- Relations: Emma Hjorth (aunt); Carl Thorvald Lippestad (cousin)
- Parent: Johan Anton Lippestad

Johan Andreas Lippestad (19 December 1902 – 7 November 1961) was a Norwegian minister in the NS government of Vidkun Quisling, from 1941 to 1945. He was responsible for the evacuation of Finnmark in 1944, together with Jonas Lie. In the post-war legal purges in Norway he was convicted of treason and sentenced to life imprisonment with forced labour. He was released from prison in 1956.

Lippestad died in Oslo on 7 November 1961, at the age of 58.
