= Legal purge in Norway after World War II =

Trial, sentencing and punishment of pro-Nazi Norwegian collaborators after WWII

The legal purge in Norway after World War II (Norwegian: Landssvikoppgjøret; lit. 'National treachery Settlement') took place between May 1945 and August 1948 against anyone who was found to have collaborated with the German occupation of the country. Several thousand Norwegians and foreign citizens were tried and convicted for crimes committed in Scandinavia during World War II. However, the scope, legal basis, and fairness of these trials has since been a matter of some debate. A total of 40 people—including Vidkun Quisling, the self-proclaimed and Nazi-supported Minister President of Norway during the occupation—were executed after capital punishment was reinstated in Norway. Thirty-seven of those executed were executed under Norwegian law, while the other three were executed under Allied military law.

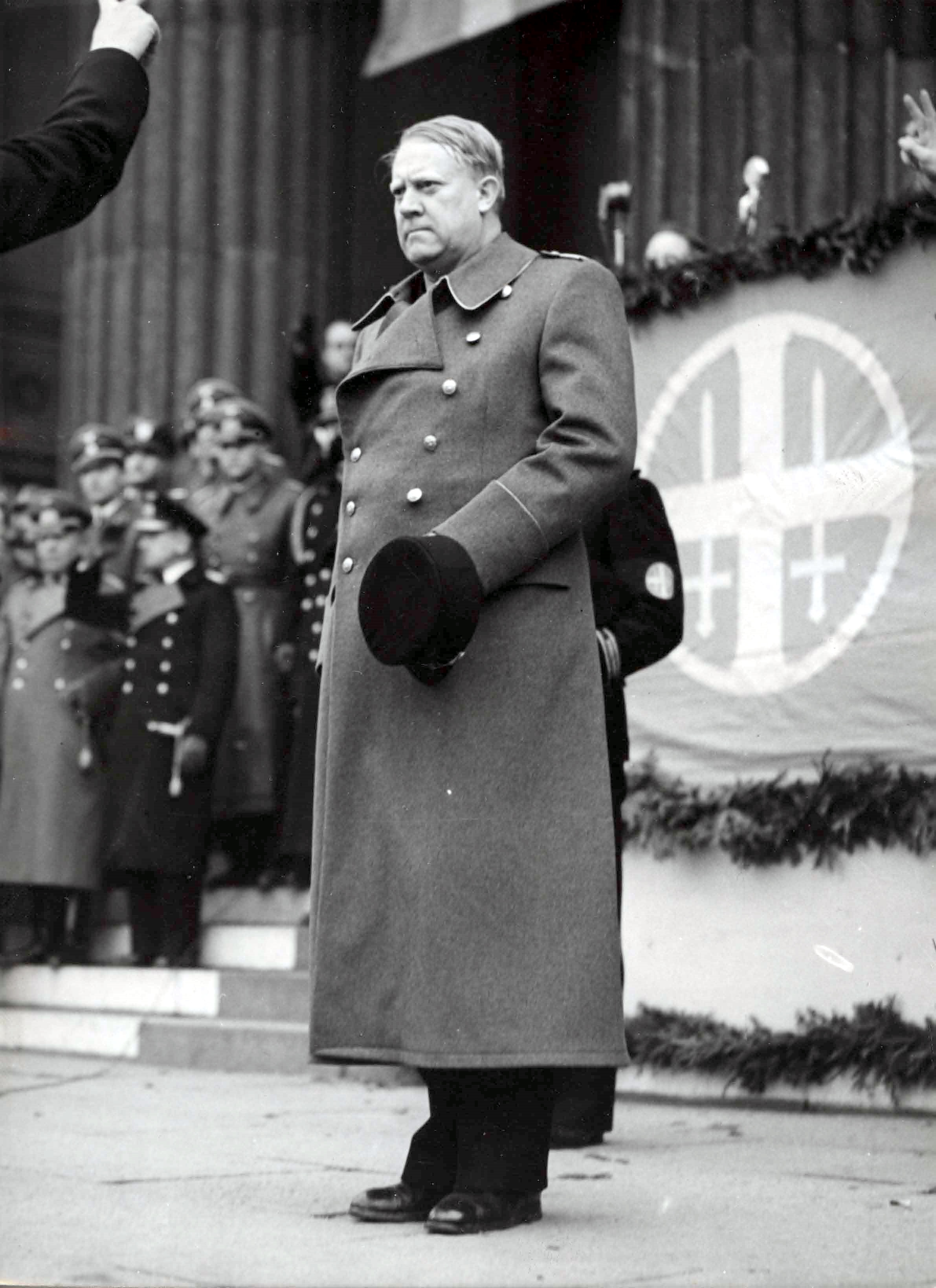
Vidkun Quisling, the Prime Minister during the German occupation of Norway

== Background ==
The German invasion of Norway during World War II created a number of constitutional issues, chiefly related to what was the legitimate Norwegian government, and whether the constitution and Norwegian code of law remained in effect during the occupation. Although the occupying power, under Reichskommissar Josef Terboven and the puppet Norwegian regime under Vidkun Quisling, claimed that the Norwegian government had abandoned its authority in the spring of 1940, the Norwegian government claimed that it had merely capitulated in the military struggle for the homeland, while the executive branch had been given special powers by the Storting (Norwegian parliament) through the Elverum Authorization. The Norwegian government's claim was upheld both by parliament and the Norwegian Supreme Court after the war, which in turn led to an extensive set of indictments and convictions against Norwegian citizens for treason, and German citizens for war crimes.

As early as 1941 and 1942, the Norwegian government-in-exile put into effect a number of decrees regarding treasonous acts. Capital punishment was reinstated as an option, prison sentences with hard labor were approved, higher upper limits for financial penalties introduced, and a controversial, new measure known as "loss of public confidence" (Norwegian: tap av almenn tillit) adopted, which would effectively deprive those convicted of various civil privileges. These decrees reached a final, workable form on 15 December 1944, the so-called Landssvikanordning. Crimes defined in these decrees notably included membership of Nasjonal Samling, the Norwegian fascist party that collaborated with the Nazis.

== Culpable acts during the occupation ==
In autumn 1940 the Nazi-supporting Norwegian fascist party, Nasjonal Samling, was declared as the only legal political organization in Norway. Its claim to be the government was based on the premise that the pre-war leadership had abdicated its responsibilities by leaving Norway. As Nasjonal Samling had taken the responsible course by assuming the mantle of power, it was therefore the legal administration. However it never achieved any level of support justifying its claim to be the legitimate Norwegian government.

This was the view taken in London by Norway's government-in-exile. It saw the Nazi Party and its Third Reich to be the "enemy of war". Anything that aided or encouraged the German occupation of Norway was to be considered in principle an act of treason; this included membership of Nasjonal Samling. (Note: A landmark case was brought against the ageing Nobel laureate Knut Hamsun, who had written admiring articles about Hitler and Nazism. Even though he was never proven to be a member of Nasjonal Samling, he was still convicted and sentenced.) Norway's exiled government also considered it to be a criminal act to assist the Nazi regime through economic support and commercial activities.

Norwegians who had volunteered for military service with the Wehrmacht or, especially, the Germanic-SS were subject to criminal prosecution after the war. Police officers who worked with the RSHA in the Statspolitiet (Norwegian Secret State Police) or joined the Gestapo faced charges relating to war crimes, torture, executions, and the mistreatment of prisoners.

== Arrests, trials and executions ==
In May 1945, at the close of World War II, the paramilitary Milorg (Norway's official resistance movement in the war) joined units of the Norwegian police that had been trained in Sweden. Both had been well briefed and prepared ahead of the official liberation on 8 May 1945. The Norwegian government-in-exile assembled this force because it viewed the avoidance of lynching or other extrajudicial punishment of former members of the Nazi regime as being of paramount importance. Nevertheless, during the summer of 1945, there was a fierce debate reported in Norwegian newspapers about the prosecution and punishment of war criminals and traitors. Many spoke openly of retaliation, but others argued that death penalty was a "drawback for a civilized community". As tensions hardened, those fighting against the death penalty for humanitarian reasons were stigmatized as "the silk front". Those who favored harsh penalties were known as "the ice front". The editorial pages of Norwegian newspapers (Dagbladet being one of the most prominent) demanded harsh penalties.

Within just a few days of the war ending, up to 28,750 people were arrested for questioning. Although many were released quickly, between 5,000 and 6,000 individuals were still in custody in August 1946.

Former wartime resistance leader Sven Arntzen was made acting chief barrister of the Norwegian Prosecuting Authority. He was given the responsibility for bringing the cases to trial. Arntzen played a highly public role in establishing the principles that should drive the trials. This led to considerable public and internal debate about the nature of the legal purges.

Altogether prosecutors requested death sentences in 200 cases of treason; of these only 30 were passed down, with 25 being carried out. All were executed by firing squad, except for Erich Hoffmann, who was hanged. From the beginning, the application of capital punishment was controversial in Norway, in part because the country's first government instituted capital punishment before the Norwegian parliament had reconvened after the war.

== People executed ==
Forty people were executed. Thirty-seven of them were executed under Norwegian law, and the other three under Allied military law. One man was hanged; the rest were shot.

=== For treason under Norwegian law ===
Name	Date	Location	Notes
Reidar Haaland	17 August 1945	Akershus Fortress, Oslo	Served in the Statspolitiet
Hans Birger Egeberg	4 October 1945	Kristiansten Fortress, Trondheim	Member of the Rinnan gang
Arne Braa Saatvedt	20 October 1945	Akershus	Served in the Statspolitiet
Vidkun Quisling	24 October 1945	Akershus	Coup leader, head of the pro-Nazi puppet government
Hans Jakob Skaar Pedersen	30 March 1946	Sverresborg Fortress, Bergen	Served in the Statspolitiet
Albert Viljam Hagelin	25 May 1946	Akershus	Interior minister
Alfred Josef Gärtner	8 August 1946	Sverresborg	German-born translator for the Gestapo
Holger Tou	30 January 1947	Sverresborg	Served in the Statspolitiet
Henry Rinnan	1 February 1947	Kristiansten	Leader of the Rinnan gang
Ole Wehus	10 March 1947	Akershus	Served in the Statspolitiet
Eilif Rye Pisani	2 April 1947	Kvarven Fortress, Bergen	Translator for the Gestapo
Einar Dønnum	22 April 1947	Akershus	Served in the Statspolitiet
Johny Alf Larsen	29 May 1947	Bremnes Fortress, Bodø	Translator for the Gestapo
Max Emil Gustav Rook	5 June 1947	Sverresborg	German-born translator for the Gestapo
Per Fredrik Bergeen	12 July 1947	Kristiansten	Member of the Rinnan gang
Harald Grøtte	12 July 1947	Kristiansten	Member of the Rinnan gang
Olaus Salberg Peter Hamrun	12 July 1947	Kristiansten	Member of the Rinnan gang
Harry Arnfinn Hofstad	12 July 1947	Kristiansten	Member of the Rinnan gang
Bjarne Konrad Jenshus	12 July 1947	Kristiansten	Member of the Rinnan gang
Aksel Julius Mære	12 July 1947	Kristiansten	Member of the Rinnan gang
Kristian Johan Randal	12 July 1947	Kristiansten	Member of the Rinnan gang
Harry Aleksander Rønning	12 July 1947	Kristiansten	Member of the Rinnan gang
Olav Aspheim	19 March 1948	Akershus	Served in the Statspolitiet
Hermann Eduard Franz Dragass	10 July 1948	Kristiansten	German-born translator for the Gestapo
Ragnar Skancke	28 August 1948	Akershus	Minister for Church and Educational Affairs in Quisling's government; the last person to be executed in Norway

=== For war crimes under Norwegian law ===
Name	Date	Location	Notes
Karl-Hans Hermann Klinge	28 March 1946	Akershus	
Ludwig Runzheimer	6 July 1946	Sverresborg	
Nils Peter Bernhard Hjelmberg	8 August 1946	Sverresborg	Danish national
Willi August Kesting	8 August 1946	Sverresborg	
Emil Hugo Friedrich Koeber	22 March 1947	Kristiansten	
August Stuckmann	28 March 1947	Akershus	
Richard Wilhelm Hermann Bruns	20 September 1947	Akershus	
Rudolf Theodor Adolf Schubert	20 September 1947	Akershus	
Otto Wilhelm Albert Suhr	10 January 1948	Akershus	
Gerhard Friedrich Ernst Flesch	28 February 1948	Kristiansten	
Siegfried Wolfgang Fehmer	16 March 1948	Akershus	
Julius Hans Christian Nielson	10 July 1948	Kristiansten	

=== For war crimes under Allied military law ===
The three men executed under Allied military law were convicted and sentenced after standing trial in Oslo.

Name	Date	Location	Notes
Hans Wilhelm Blomberg	10 January 1946	Akershus	
Werner Seeling	10 January 1946	Akershus	
Erich Hoffmann	15 May 1946	Hamelin Prison, Hamelin	Hoffmann was not shot in Norway, but instead hanged at Hamelin Prison in Germany

== Legacy ==
These were the last executions carried out in Norway.

A great deal of sensitivity continues to surround this subject in Norwegian society. For example, the volunteers who joined the Waffen-SS and served on the Eastern Front were tried only for treason, never for war crimes.
