= Wilhelm Jürgensen =

Norwegian military officer (1762–1842)

- Born: 1762; Schleswick, Duchy of Schleswig
- Died: 1842 (age c. 80); Hole in Ringerike, Norway
- Military career
- Allegiance: Denmark–Norway; Norway
- Branch: Army
- Rank: Major
- Commands: Lærdalske lette infanterikompani
- Conflicts: Lærdal farmers' rebellion; Dano-Swedish War (1808–1809); Battle of Trangen
- Awards: Knight of the Order of Dannebrog

Wilhelm Jürgensen (1762 in Schleswick – 1842) was a Norwegian military officer. He had the rank of Captain from 1802, and the rank of Major from 1814. He commanded the Lærdalske lette infanterikompani from its establishment in 1802. He was decorated Knight of the Order of Dannebrog for his war merits.
