= Anders Olson Lysne =

- Born: 1764
- Died: June 1803; Bergen, Norway
- Cause of death: Decapitation
- Occupation: Farmer
- Known for: Lærdal farmers' rebellion

Anders Olson Lysne (born 1764, died 1803), was a farmer who led the Lærdal farmers' rebellion from 1800 to 1802. The rebellion began after the government of Denmark-Norway ordered that the farmers of Lærdal had to do compulsory military service in addition to compulsory labor on The Bergen King's Road. The farmers in Lærdal had been exempted from military service due to the heavy duty work on the stretch of road that went from Lærdal over the mountain pass known as Filefjell and to the district of Valdres.

The rebellion lasted for two years until the rebels were defeated on 9 July 1802 when the government sent 500 men led by Lieutenant Wilhelm Jürgensen, to Lærdal to crush the rebellion. Lysne was then captured, and he was sentenced to death and beheaded in June 1803 in Bergen. Lysne was executed for Lèse-majesté. Refusing to obey the King's commands was considered treason against the country, in an absolute monarchy (Denmark–Norway was an absolute monarchy at the time), this was in practise equal to treason against the King himself, i.e. lèse-majesté. Lysne was around the age of 41 when he was executed.

Lysne was the only leader of the revolt to be sentenced to death. The other leaders of the uprising were sentenced to imprisonment. After the uprising, the farmers military service was organized as the Lærdal Light Infantry Company and its first commander was Wilhelm Jürgensen.

== Legacy ==
Lysne is not as known as other Norwegian farmer rebel leaders from the last years of the Danish-Norwegian Union, like Jochum de Lange (Strilekrigen) and Christian Jensen Lofthuus. The Lærdal rebellion was the last big farmers rebellion before the end of the union in 1814. Lysne was also the last person in Norway executed for lèse-majesté.

In 1993, 190 years after his execution, a re-enactment of his execution was performed to commemorate Lysne.
