= Kristiansten Fortress =

Fortress in Trondheim, Norway

Coordinates: 63°25′37″N 10°24′38″E

- Kristiansten festning
- Trondheim, Norway
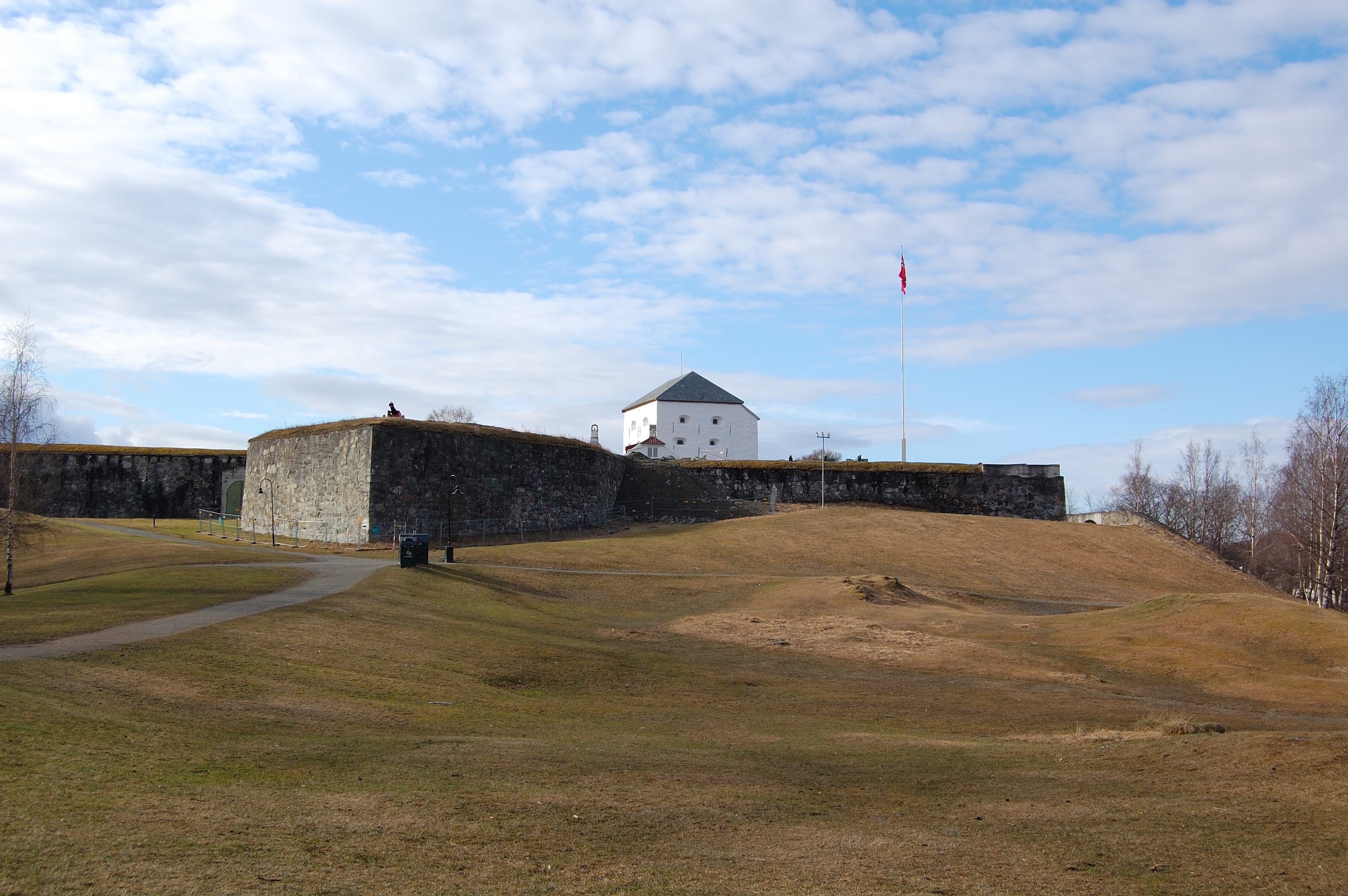

Site information
- Controlled by: Norway

Site history
- Built: 1681-1685
- Built by: Johan Caspar von Cicignon and Anthony Coucheron
- In use: 1685-1816
- Battles/wars: Swedish invasion 1718

Kristiansten Fortress (Norwegian: Kristiansten Festning, historically spelled Christiansten) is located on a hill east of the city of Trondheim which is located within Trondheim Municipality in Trøndelag county, Norway, named after Christian V of Denmark-Norway. It was built after the city fire of Trondheim in 1681 to protect the city against attack from the east. Construction was finished in 1685. It fulfilled its purpose in 1718 when Swedish forces laid siege against Trondheim. The fortress was decommissioned in 1816 by King Charles XIV John.

== Construction ==
Panoramic view

Trondheim was traditionally protected with fortifications by the river Nidelven and Skansen, but the city was vulnerable to attack from the east. The Fortress was therefore put on a hill to protect the city centre and control the area from Ila to Lade. General Johan Caspar von Cicignon, who was chief inspector of fortifications, was responsible for the new town plan of Trondheim after the great fire of 18 April 1681. He also made the plans for the construction of Kristiansten Fortress.

The fortress was built during the period from 1682 to 1684 and strengthened to a complete defence fortification in 1691 by building an advanced post Kristiandsands bastion in the east and in 1695 with the now vanished Møllenberg skanse by the river Nidelven. These fortifications were encircled by a continuous palisade and thereby connected to the fortified city. In 1750 the fortress was modernized with new bastions and casemates to protect against mortar artillery. Two new isolated defensive works were also built to the east - Grüner's and Frølich's redoubts - but they are hardly visible today.

The main building featured in the picture is the defensive tower - Donjonen - with artillery, quartering and stores was the centre of the defences. After decommissioning in 1816 it was location of the fire watch, and since 1997 as a museum.

== Great Northern War ==
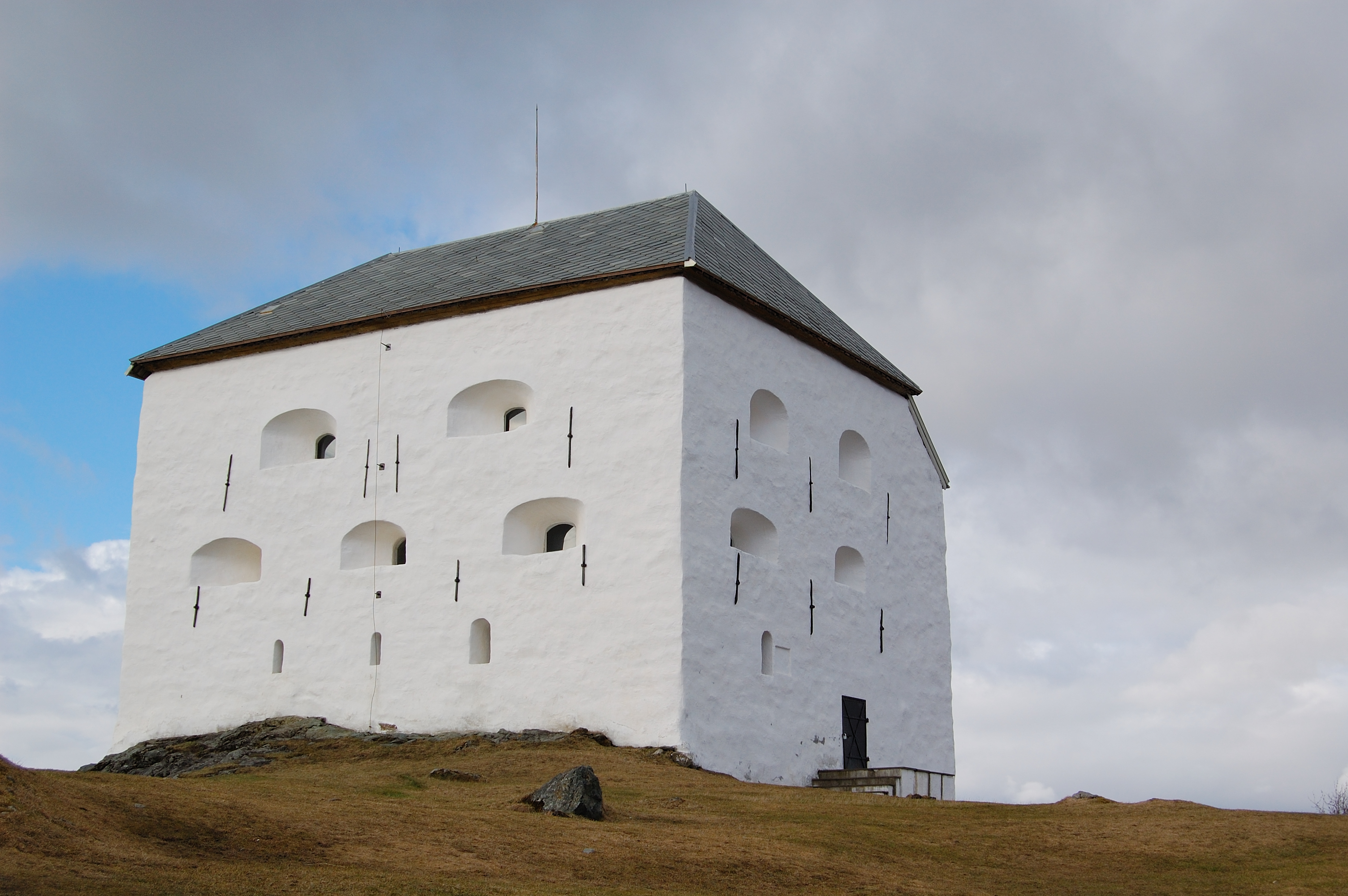
The defensive tower - Donjonen.

In the final years of the Great Northern War, Charles XII of Sweden initiated a second invasion of Norway in the fall of 1718. While Charles XII led his main army in an attack from the south at Fredrikshald, an army under General Carl Gustaf Armfeldt (or Armfelt) was sent into Trøndelag to seize Trondheim. Armfeldt advanced against Trondheim, which was defended by an army of 6,900 men under Vincens Budde. The Swedish forces were resisted both by Norwegian forces and by the people of the countryside, who bitterly recalled the previous Swedish occupation of Trøndelag. Provisions were not available, and the Norwegian winter set in. Although he reached the city and laid siege, the strength of Kristiansten Fortress and other fortifications was such that he chose to retreat toward Verdal. Charles XII issued a sharp rebuke and ordered Armfeldt to take Trondheim. Although Armfeldt's forces surrounded Trondheim, Budde's forces were able to keep him at bay. Camping in the open and poorly fed, many of Armfeldt's troops fell ill and his capable forces were reduced to 4,000 men. When Charles XII was killed in December by a bullet at Fredriksten Fortress, Armfeldt's forces retreated to Sweden. On their way back across the mountains, almost the entire army was lost, mostly because of snow, cold temperature and a strong blizzard; the retreat has been likened to Napoleon’s from Moscow for the severity of casualties.

== The 20th century ==
Gun salute on December 4, 2005 celebrating Prince Sverre Magnus of Norway who was born the previous day

The Norwegian war flag with the badge denoting the union with Sweden was hauled down on 9 June 1905, and the "pure" war flag was hoisted instead, with full military honours and gun salutes for both flags. On 18 November 1905 a twenty-one gun salute was again fired from Kristiansten Fortress to proclaim the election of Prince Carl of Denmark as the new King of Norway under the name of Haakon VII of Norway. The flag of union with Sweden was hauled down and the Flag of Norway hoisted.

During German occupation of Norway in World War II the Nazis executed a number of Norwegian patriots at Kristiansten.

The fortress was the official place of execution of convicted and condemned traitors and war criminals following the legal purge in Norway after World War II. The notorious Henry Rinnan was executed here on 1 February 1947, and nine of his followers afterwards, eight of them on the same day in 1947.

== View ==
From this fortress you can see "strandlinja"; a topographical line along the hills of the Bymarka which was formerly beaches and sea cliffs. The "line" can be seen stretching out in the hills around Trondheim, but is best seen from the fortress, towards Byåsen.
