= Statspolitiet =

Statspolitiet Statspolitiet
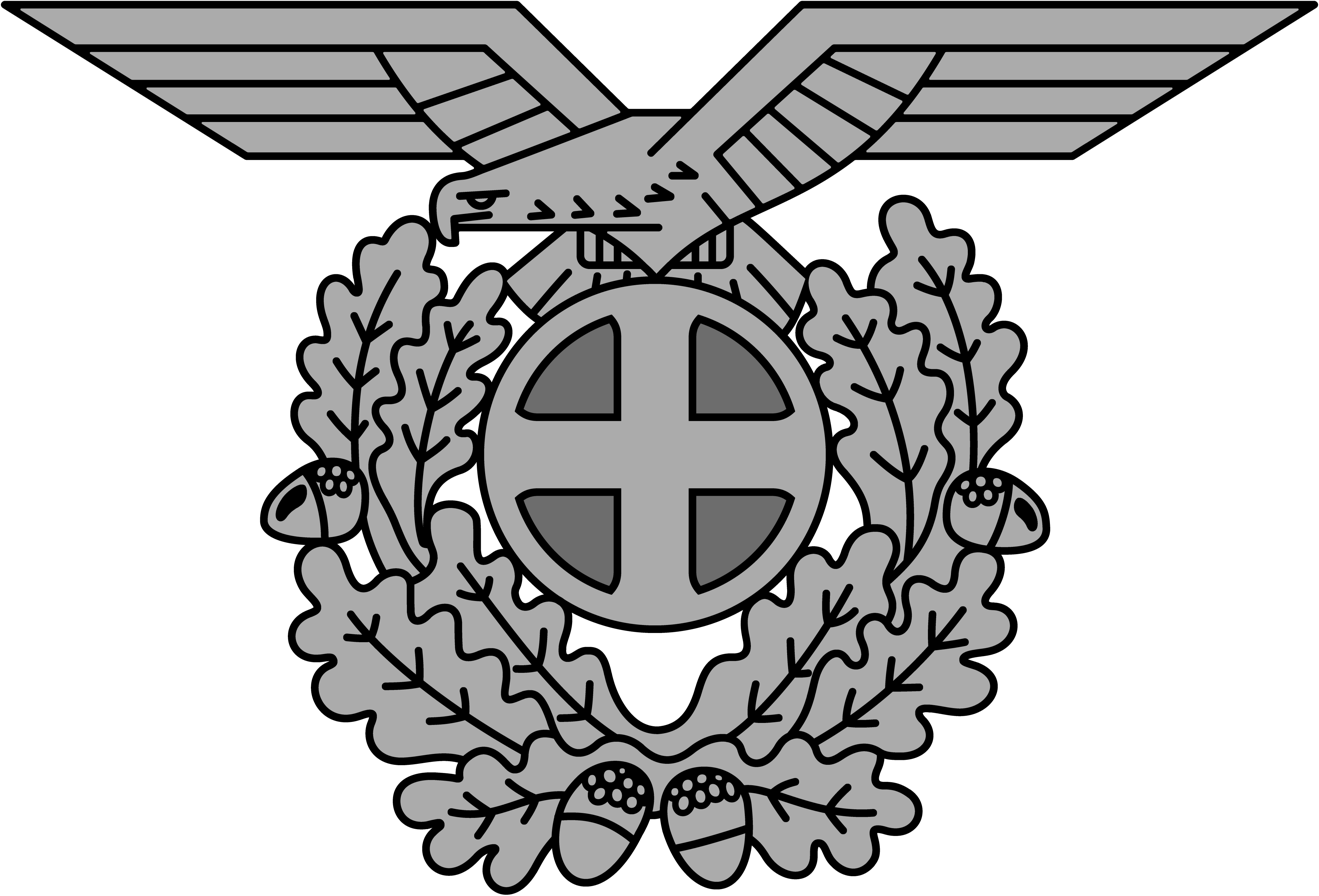
- Emblem of Statspolitiet contained Nasjonal Samling's sun cross with eagle.
- Abbreviation: STAPO

Agency overview
- Formed: 1 June 1941
- Dissolved: 8 May 1945

Jurisdictional structure
- Operations jurisdiction: German-occupied Norway

Statspolitiet (transl. the State Police; shortened STAPO) was from 1941 to 1945 a National Socialist armed police force that consisted of Norwegian officials after Nazi German pattern. It operated independently of the ordinary Norwegian police. The force was established on 1 June 1941 during the German occupation of Norway. The initiative for the force came from the later chief Karl Marthinsen and other prominent members of the collaborationist party Nasjonal Samling. At its peak, in 1944 there were 350 employees in Statspolitiet, in addition to a larger number who collaborated or rendered services for them.

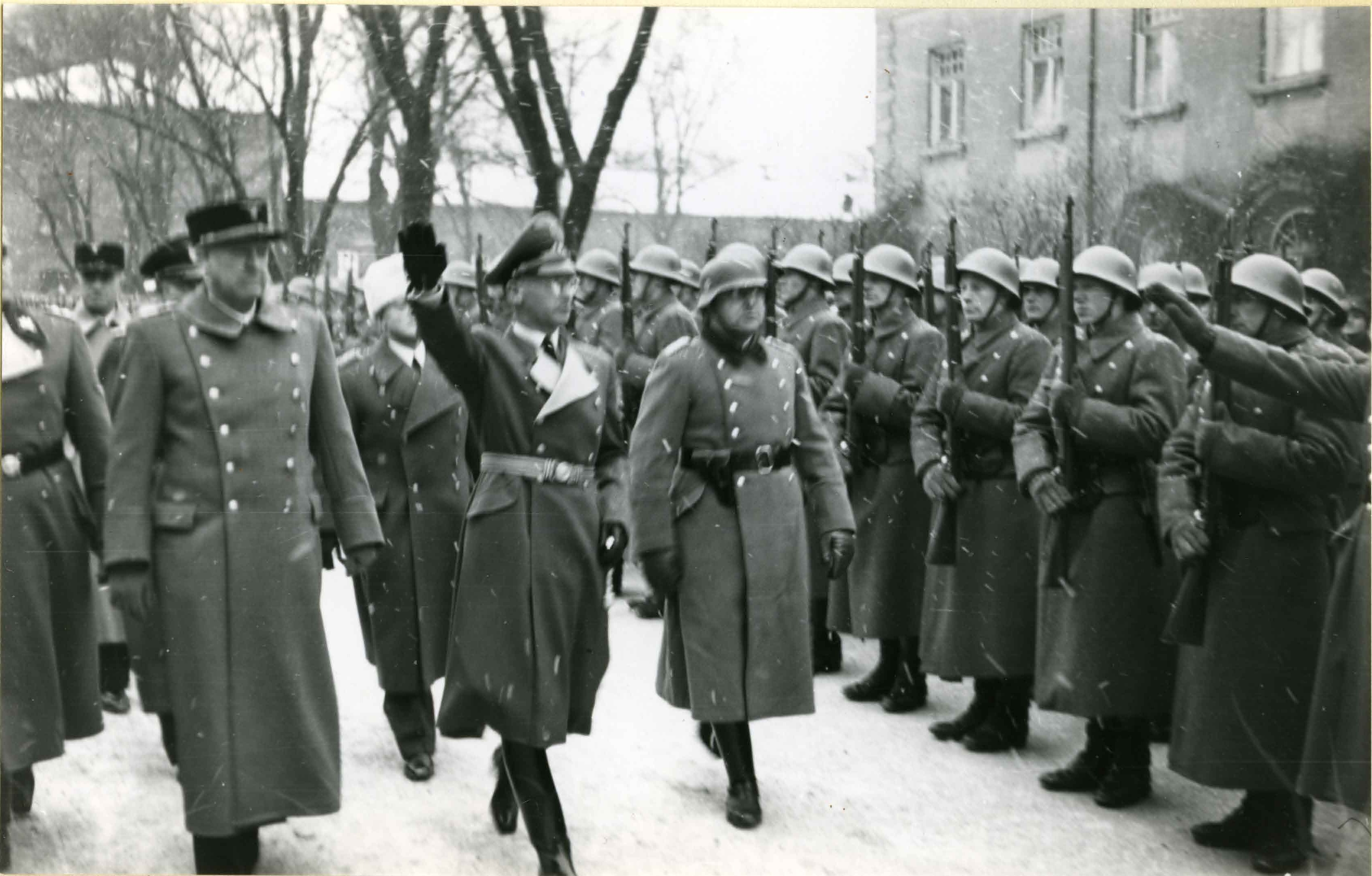
Vidkun Quisling (left) and Reichskommissar Josef Terboven (center) inspects an honor company of Statspolitiet officers in 1942.

== Description ==
Its purpose was primarily to combat so-called political crimes, refugees, espionage, sabotage, armed resistance and other kinds of resistance against the German occupation forces or the Norwegian collaborationist Quisling regime. Statspolitiet played an important role during the Holocaust in Norway, aiding in the deportation of the Jews in Norway. Norwegians were arrested by contemporary laws, and many were later sent to prison camps in Norway and concentration camps in what was then Germany. Statspolitiet was organized with a headquarters in Oslo and six subsidiaries in Oslo and Aker, Stavanger, Bergen, Trondheim, Tromsø and Kirkenes. Statspolitiet was subordinate to the chief of the security police and the Norwegian Minister of Police, Jonas Lie. Statspolitiet also received orders directly from the Reich Security Main Office. The general of Statspolitiet, Karl A Marthinsen was assassinated by the Norwegian resistance movement on 8 February 1945. This caused massive reprisals, in which 34 imprisoned resistance fighters were executed at Akershus Fortress.

== After World War II ==
After the German capitulation on 8 May 1945, Statspolitiet was disbanded immediately. Former officers of Statspolitiet were arrested and tried in Norwegian courts, and were found guilty of varying degrees of such crimes as treason, illegal detention, torture, maltreatments, murders and illegal executions. The punishments were harsh and included the use of capital punishment. The death sentences for the Statspolitiet officers Reidar Haaland, Arne Saatvedt, Hans Jacob Skaar Pedersen, Holger Tou, Ole Wehus, Olav Aspheim and Einar Dønnum were fulfilled, the officers being executed by firing squad.

== Ranks and rank insignia ==
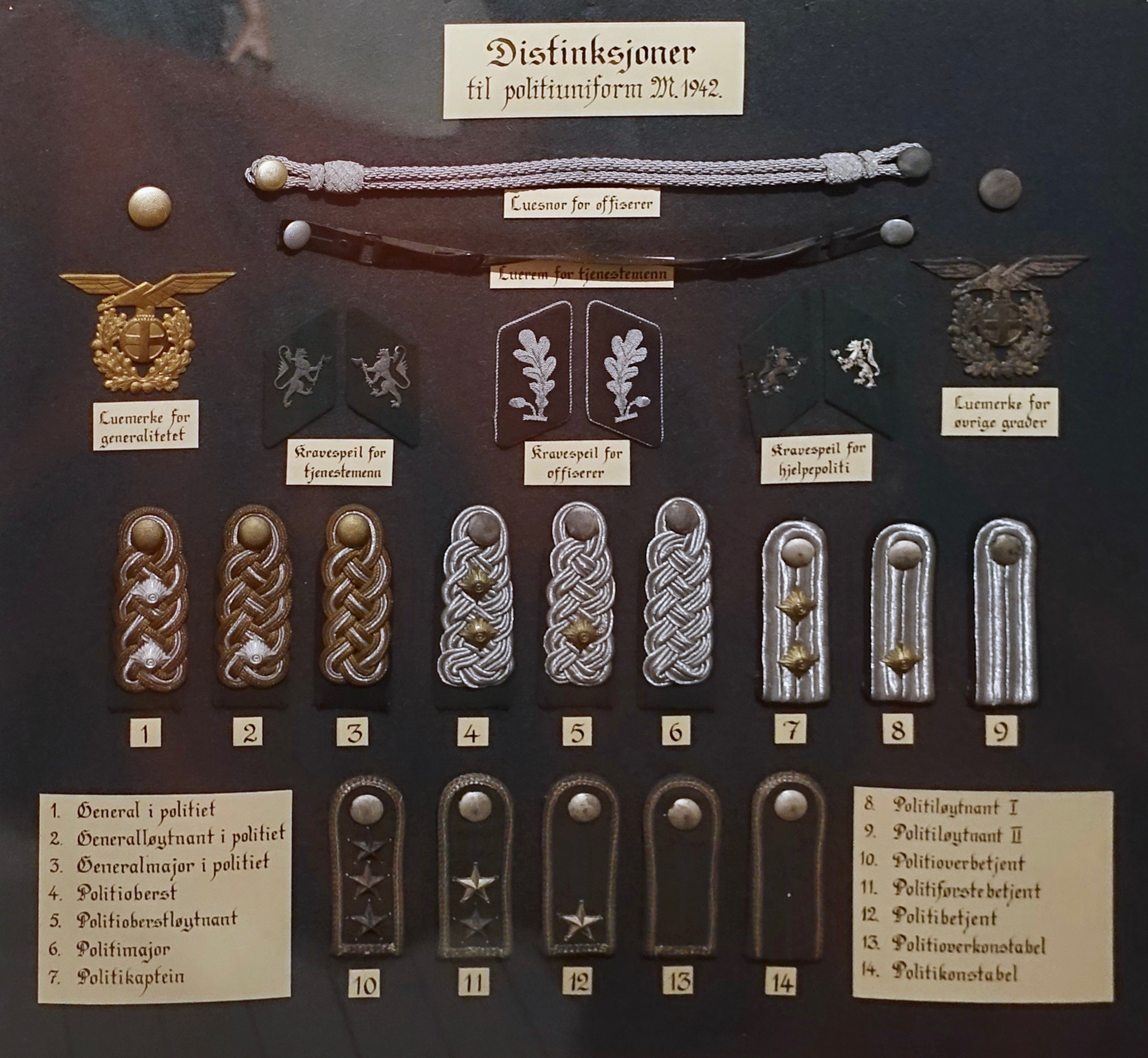
Rank insignia of the Norwegian State Police.

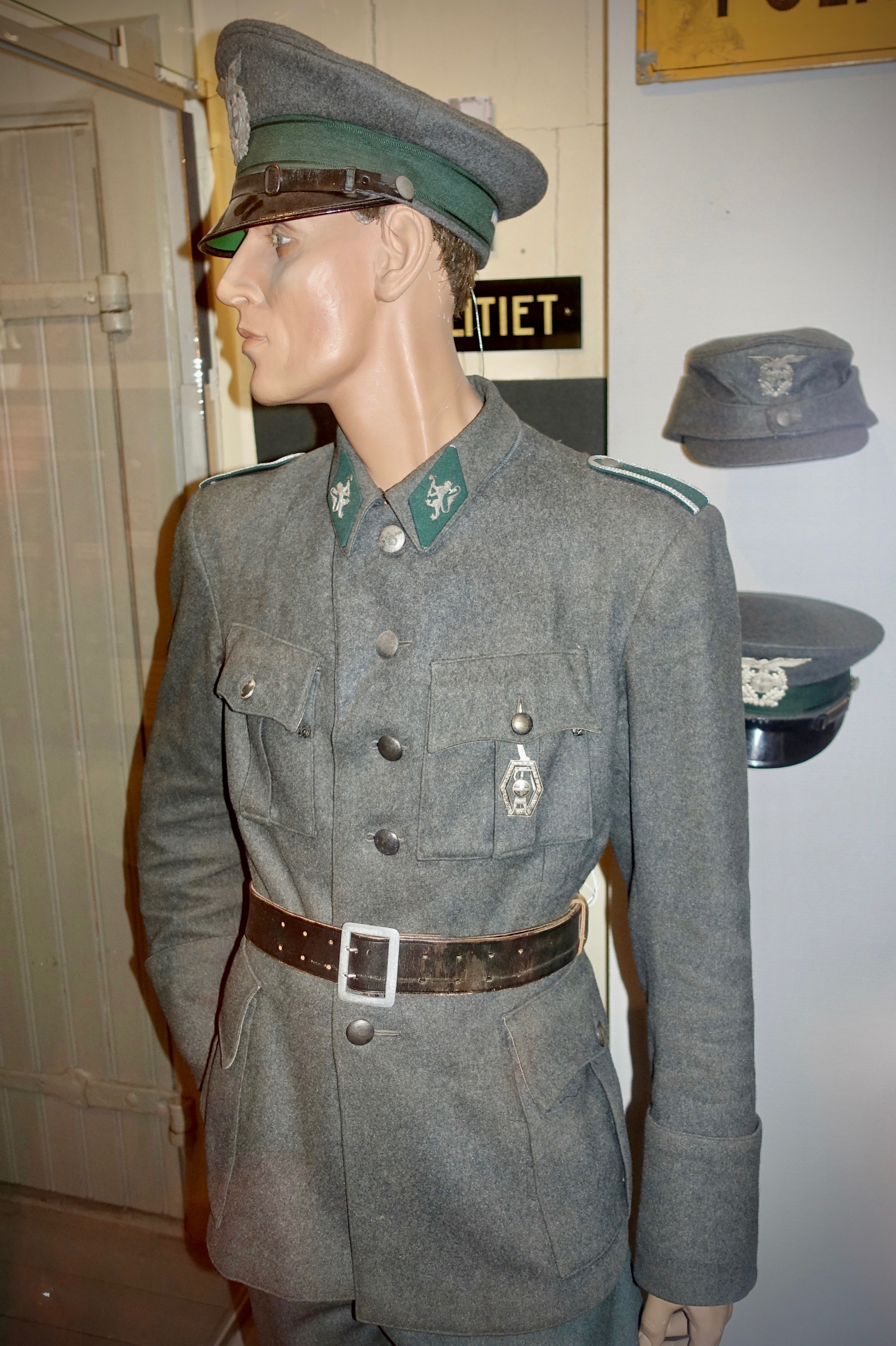
Politikonstabel of Statspolitiet.

Insignia		Rank	Comparative rank in the Wehrmacht
Collar	Shoulder	Rank	Comparative rank in the Wehrmacht
		General i politiet	General der Waffengattung
		Generalløjtnant i politiet	Generalleutnant
		Generalmajor i politiet	Generalmajor
		Politioberst	Oberst
		Politioberstløytnant	Oberstleutnant
		Politimajor	Major
		Politikaptein	Hauptmann
		Politiløytnant I	Oberleutnant
		Politiløytnant II	Leutnant
Enlisted
		Politoverbetjent
		Politiførstebetjent
		Politibetjent
		Politioverkonstabel
		Politikonstabel
