= Egil Reichborn-Kjennerud =

Norwegian judge, racing cyclist and sports administrator (1903–1974)

Egil Reichborn-Kjennerud (4 February 1903 – 10 April 1974) was a Norwegian judge, cyclist and sports administrator. He was a Norwegian champion in cycling. During World War II he was a sports leader under the Nazi rule, leading the Norwegian Confederation of Sports from 1940 to 1942.

He administrated the court which sentenced police officer Gunnar Eilifsen to death, but voted against death penalty. After the war he was convicted to ten years prison for treason.
