= Sverresborg (Bergen) =

Fortress in Bergen, Norway

Coordinates: 60°24′00″N 05°19′12″E

- Bergen, Norway
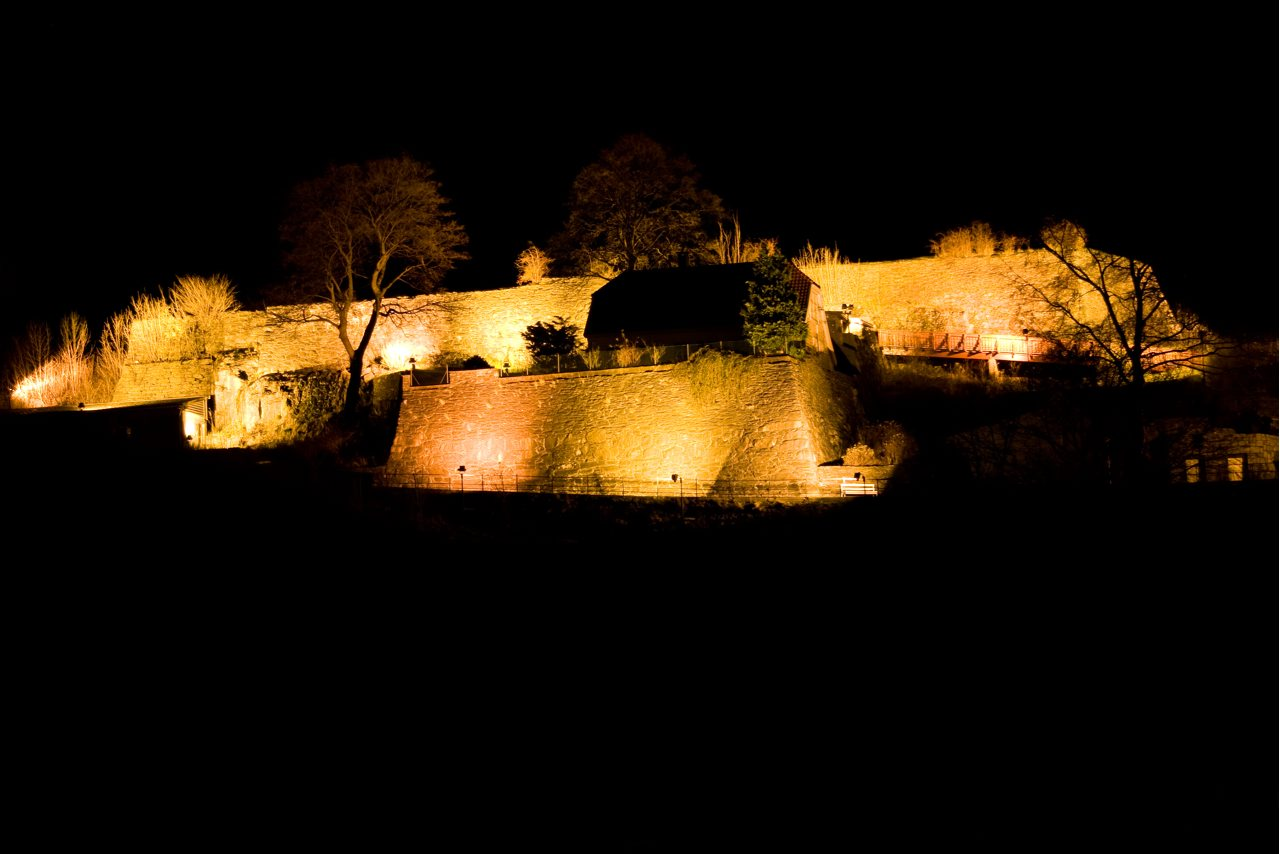
- Sverresborg at night.

Site information
- Type: Medieval fortress
- Controlled by: Norway

Site history
- Built: Ca. 1184
- In use: Ca.1184-today
- Materials: Stone
- Battles/wars: Civil war Battle of Vågen; World War II

Sverresborg (Norwegian: Sverresborg i Bergen) is a fortress and former castle situated in the Norwegian city of Bergen.

== History ==
It was built by King Sverre Sigurdsson (ca. 1150–1202) in the mid 1180s, 250 meters northeast of Bergenhus fortress. King Sverre Sigurdsson also had a Sverresborg built in Trondheim. It is thought that the fortress had an outer wall of stone and inner buildings of wood. Sverris saga mentions that 600 men and 40 noble women lived in the fortress ca. 1207.

Sverresborg was the site of several battles during the Civil war era in Norway. The castle fell to the baglers and was destroyed, but was rebuilt by Håkon Jarl. The baglers destroyed it a second time and it has been rebuilt several times. Much of the remaining structures are from the 17th century. The site was reinforced by King Håkon Håkonsson after the great fire of 1248. The medieval fort remained until the mid-16th century. Directly underneath Sverresborg lies the residence of the master of the ramparts (Vollmesterboligen), the oldest of which go back to the 18th century. The master of the ramparts was in charge of the maintenance and upkeep of the fortifications and buildings. In August 1665, the fortress participated in the Battle of Vågen. The last known expansions took place during the Napoleonic Wars.

== Present day ==
In the 1830s a park was laid out in the area and in 1911 a petty officers school was established for Bergen Brigade (Bergenske Brigades Underoffiserskole). During World War II the German occupants established two anti aircraft batteries in the fortress. After the war, Sverresborg used as the execution site in connection with treason settlement. Seven German and one Norwegian war criminals were executed in Sverresborg in 1946.

The fortress has not fulfilled an operative capacity since World War II, but is still used by the military of Norway for office and training facilities. The area is today under the command of the commandant of Bergenhus Fortress and is a military area, but open to the public.

== Other sources ==
- Krag, Claus Sverre – Norges største middelalderkonge (Oslo: H. Aschehoug & Co. 2005)
- Litleskare, Ola Bergenhus på kryss og tvers (Bergen: 1998)
