= Jonas Lie (government minister) =

Norwegian politician (1899–1945)

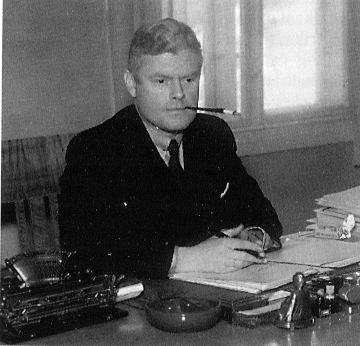
- Jonas Lie as a police chief before World War II

Personal details
- Born: 31 December 1899 Kristiania, Norway
- Died: 11 May 1945 (aged 45) Skallum, Norway
- Party: Nasjonal Samling
- Parent: Erik Lie
- Relatives: Jonas Lie (grandfather); Nils Kjær (uncle)
- Military Service
- Allegiance: Nazi Germany
- Branch: Waffen-SS
- Unit: Norwegian Legion
- Conflicts: Second World War; Eastern Front; Siege of Leningrad

Jonas Lie (31 December 1899 – 11 May 1945) was a Norwegian councilor of state in the Nasjonal Samling government of Vidkun Quisling in 1940, then acting councilor of state 1940–1941, and Minister of Police between 1941 and 1945 in the new Quisling government. Lie was the grandson of the novelist Jonas Lie and the son of the writer Erik Lie.

== Early life ==
Raised in a family with close ties to Germany, Lie was a war correspondent on the Western front and Eastern front during World War I. He was a successful police officer in the 1930s. He was the police officer charged with accompanying Leon Trotsky on a freighter from Norway to Mexico. His political convictions may have been influenced by his uncle Nils Kjær, who was an ardent antisemite.

== Fascism ==
It is possible that Lie was introduced to Heinrich Himmler as early as 1935. They maintained a close personal relationship during the entire Nazi era. Lie became a rival of Vidkun Quisling's during the occupation of Norway.

Despite his later collaborationist stance, Lie took part in the defense of Norway after the German invasion of Norway, fighting at Folldal. After suffering an injury to his foot, Lie was captured by the Germans and briefly held prisoner.

Lie became one of the first Norwegian SS volunteers when he served for a brief period of time during the Balkans campaign of 1940 as a war correspondent in Leibstandarte Adolf Hitler together with Minister of Justice Sverre Riisnæs. He later led the 1st Police Company of the Norwegian Legion of the Waffen-SS on the Leningrad Front in 1942–43.

Lie was also the official leader of the Germanic SS in Norway. This organisation, first known as Norges SS (founded 1941) and Germanske SS Norge (re-founded 1942) was a Norwegian equivalent to the German Allgemeine SS.

In late 1944, after pressure from Josef Terboven, Quisling appointed the Ministers Jonas Lie and Johan Andreas Lippestad as 1st and 2nd County Governors of Finnmark county in the extreme north of Norway. Lie, Lippestad and others went to Kirkenes in mid-October 1944 to order an evacuation of the civil population in order to assist the German plans for a scorched earth policy in the face of the Soviet forces who were about to push German forces back into Norway.

He died at Skallum on 11 May 1945, just before being arrested. The cause of death is unknown, as the autopsy was unable to find any evidence of suicide. It was widely believed a combination of stress, a large consumption of alcohol and lack of sleep was the cause of his death. It is also a fact that he had a heart condition, was a chain-smoker and had several other health problems.

== Writing ==
In the tradition of his father and grandfather, Lie was also a writer in his own right. During the 1930s, he produced a number of popular detective novels under the pen name Max Mauser. In 1942, he also published Over Balkans syv blåner, an account of his service with the Leibstandarte Adolf Hitler in the Balkans.
