= Capital punishment in Norway =

Europe holds the greatest concentration of abolitionist states (blue). Map current as of 2022 Abolished for all offences Abolished in practice Retains capital punishment

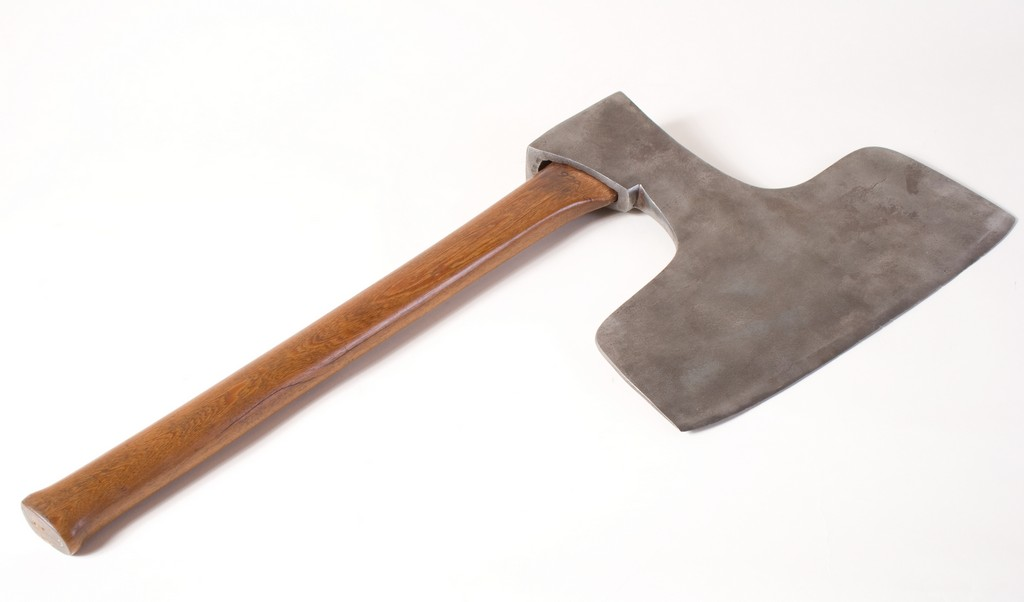
Norwegian executioner's axe from 1742 Norwegian National Museum of Justice

Capital punishment in Norway (Norwegian: dødsstraff) has been constitutionally prohibited since 2014. Before that, it had been fully abolished in 1979, and earlier, from 1905, the penal code had abolished capital punishment in peacetime.

The last execution in peacetime was carried out on 25 February 1876, when Kristoffer Nilsen Grindalen was beheaded in Løten, but 37 people, mainly Norwegians and Germans, were executed after the Second World War and the years of Nazi occupation; among them Vidkun Quisling.

== History ==
=== Early use ===
In addition to the usual capital crimes of murder and treason, medieval Norwegian law demanded execution also of people who were found guilty of witchcraft. During the witch-hunting of the 16th and 17th centuries, 300 persons were burned. About a hundred of them were from the Vardø area. Women in the north, especially in Finnmark county, were at particular risk due to the clergy and authorities believing that the devil resided at the edge of the world.

King Christian V's Norwegian Law of 1687 described several capital crimes. A law of 16 October 1697 increased the penalty for some murders by coupling torture with the executions. On the way to the execution site the convict would be pinched with red hot tongs, and a hand would be cut off prior to decapitation.

In 1757, the last known execution for bestiality in Norway was carried out.

=== Modern use ===
Until the 19th century, lèse majesté could result in capital punishment. By 1815, most inhumane forms of execution were abolished, and decapitation or shooting were the remaining authorised methods. Capital crimes were premeditated or otherwise heinous murders as well as treason.

Norway abolished the death penalty for civilian crimes in 1905, but it was retained for certain military crimes in wartime.

During the Nazi occupation of Norway (1940–1945), capital punishment was introduced by Vidkun Quisling's regime in September 1942, and the first of a total of nineteen executions was carried out on 16 August 1943, when police officer Gunnar Eilifsen was executed for disobedience. Before this, German law had applied, and four hundred Norwegians had already been executed.

In 1941, the Nygaardsvold's Cabinet exiled in London allowed for the death penalty after the war, and expanded its scope in 1942 to cover torture and murder. The legal purge that followed the occupation resulted in 72 death sentences, of which 37 people: 25 Norwegians, 11 Germans, and one Dane, were executed.

The last execution took place on 27 August 1948, when Ragnar Skancke was put before a firing squad at Akershus Fortress.

=== European Convention on Human Rights ===
In 1988, Norway signed on to protocol 6 of the European Convention on Human Rights which bans the use of capital punishment in peacetime and ratified protocol 13 which bans all use of capital punishment whatsoever in 2005. Norway generally opposes capital punishment outside of the country as well. The government banished Mullah Krekar from Norway, but did not send him to Iraq due to the possibility of him being charged with capital crimes in his home country. In the Martine Vik Magnussen case, Norway declined to cooperate with the Yemeni government unless a guarantee was made that the death penalty was not a possibility.

=== Constitutional prohibition ===
The Constitution of Norway was extensively amended in May 2014. The new article 93 in the constitution explicitly prohibits capital punishment ("Every person has the right to life. No one can be sentenced to death.") along with torture, inhumane or degrading punishments, and slavery, and compels the government to protect against these practices.

== Public opinion ==
Opinion polls have shown that about 1 in 4 Norwegians support the death penalty, with the highest support among Progress Party voters, among whom the support, as expressed in a poll from 2010, is at 51 percent. Although Progress Party politicians like Ulf Erik Knudsen and Jan Blomseth have expressed support for the death penalty for egregious cases of rape and murder, the party's policy is opposed to the death penalty. An opinion poll taken after the 2011 Norway attacks showed that the opposition to the death penalty remained firmly entrenched, with 16 percent supporting and 68 percent opposed.
