= Langfeldt =

Langfeldt is a Norwegian surname. Notable people with the surname include:

- Einar Langfeldt (1884–1966), Norwegian physician
- Gabriel Langfeldt (1895–1983), Norwegian psychiatrist
- Knut Langfeldt (1925–2018), Norwegian political scientist
- Morgan Engebretsen Langfeldt (born 1968), Norwegian politician
- Thore Langfeldt (born 1943), Norwegian psychologist and sexologist

== See also ==
- Langfeld
