= Erik Poulsen =

Erik or Eric Poulsen may refer to:

- Erik Poulsen (American politician)
- Erik Poulsen (Danish politician)
- Erik Dyreborg, né Erik Poulsen, Danish footballer
- Eric Poulsen, skier in 1970 Alpine Skiing World Cup – Men's giant slalom

== See also ==
- Erik Pauelsen (1749–1790), Danish painter
- Erik Paulson, American mixed martial artist
- Erik Poulsson (disambiguation)
