= Hans-Wilhelm Scheidt =

Hans-Wilhelm Scheidt (1907–1981) was a German Reichsamtsleiter of the NSDAP, the German Nazi Party, and liaison in Oslo during the German invasion in April 1940.

Born in Moscow and growing up in Germany, he joined the NSDAP in 1929. From 1935 he was assigned with Alfred Rosenberg's department of foreign affairs, and from 1939 he was responsible for the Nordic countries. He played a central role during the German invasion of Norway, when he was present in Oslo and persuaded Vidkun Quisling to carry through his coup d'état.

Scheidt's books include Die Schandverträge (1934) and Der Arbeitsdienst, eine Willensäußerung der deutschen Jugend (1935).
