= Russia and Ourselves =

Book by Vidkun Quisling

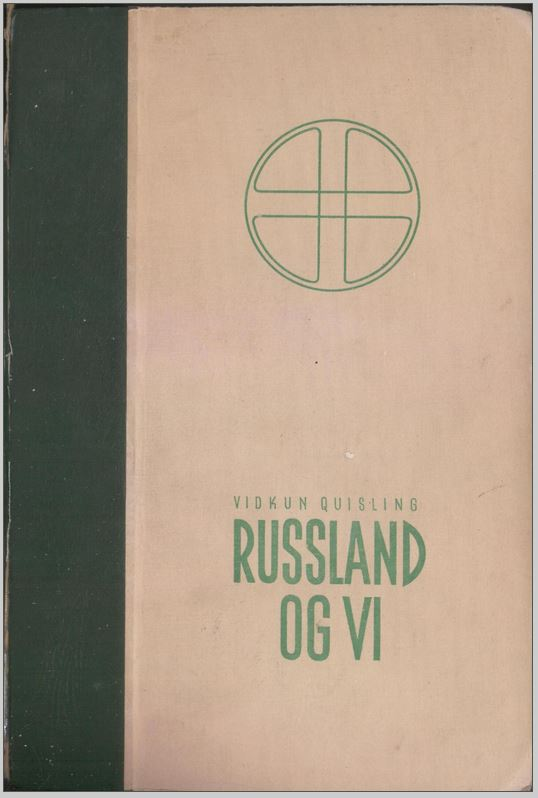
- Author: Vidkun Quisling
- Language: Norwegian
- Publication date: 1930

Russia and Ourselves (Norwegian: Russland og vi) is a book written by Vidkun Quisling. It was first published as a series of articles in the newspaper Tidens Tegn in 1930, before appearing in book form at Christmas that year.

== Themes ==
The book deals with Soviet society in the aftermath of the Russian Revolution and is strongly influenced by Quisling's fundamental anti-communist outlook. Quisling warns against a similar revolution in Norway orchestrated by the Labour Party or the Communist Party of Norway—an eventuality he believed would plunge society into chaos and result in tens of thousands of deaths.

Quisling biographer Oddvar Høidal observed that the book "bolstered [Quisling's] growing reputation as the sworn enemy of Bolshevism in Norway." He further concluded that while Quisling's criticism had substance, it lacked objectivity; "for him, the aim was to paint the Soviet Union in the darkest possible colors."

Historian Hans Fredrik Dahl described the book as "a peculiar text, undoubtedly one of the strangest intellectual documents of the Norwegian interwar period." Dahl considers Quisling's descriptions of agricultural policy and conditions in the Russian countryside to be sound, noting that "[Quisling's] critique is fluent and readable." At the same time, Dahl highlighted the racial-biological explanatory models employed in the book, in which Quisling viewed the revolution as an assault by Finno-Slavic, Asian, and Oriental peoples upon an aristocracy "of essentially Nordic origin." Quisling considered Marxism to be the most important obstacle to Norway's national reconstruction, and described the Bolsheviks as "a conspiracy against Nordic-inspired European civilization".

== Translations ==
In autumn 1931, Russia and Ourselves was published in English. It was released by the publishing house Hodder & Stoughton, likely because the publisher's Norwegian wife knew a friend of Quisling's. The book was also published in Spanish as Política de Oriente y Occidente in 1935, having been translated by an admirer.

Plans for a German edition did not materialize until the Nazi-aligned publishing house Blix released it as Russland und wir during the occupation in 1942, translated by Eberhard Günther Kern. In the German edition, the text was somewhat revised, toning down the pro-British stance of the original. Several antisemitic phrases were inserted. In the final chapter, which discusses the future of Russia, earlier statements suggesting the country needed to be rebuilt using American and British capital were replaced with wording stating that this should happen "with Scandinavian and German labor assistance".
