= Langfield =

Langfield is a surname. Notable people with the surname include:

- George Langfield (1922–1984), English rugby league footballer
- Jamie Langfield (born 1979), Scottish footballer and coach

== See also ==
- Langfeld
- Lingfield (disambiguation)
