= Erik T. Poulsson =

Norwegian lawyer (1897–1978)

- Born: 12 January 1897; Kristiansand
- Died: 1978 (aged 80–81)
- Occupations: Lawyer and civil servant
- Father: Edvard Poulsson
- Relatives: Gabriel Langfeldt (brother-in-law)
- Awards: Order of St. Olav (1953); Order of Dannebrog; Order of the Polar Star; Legion of Honour

Erik Tutein Poulsson (12 January 1897 – 1978) was a Norwegian lawyer, resistance member and civil servant.

== Personal life ==
Poulsson was born in Kristiania on 12 January 1897 to medical doctor Edvard Poulsson and Anna Sophie Tutein. He married Ingrid Plene in 1931. His sister Eva Antoinette was married to psychiatrist Gabriel Langfeldt.

== Career ==
Poulsson graduated as cand.jur. in 1919, and was barrister with access to work with the Supreme Court from 1927. He was running a law firm in Oslo together with Gerhard Holm from 1927 until Holm's death in 1948, and thereafter alone from 1948 to 1954. During the German occupation of Norway he represented the jurists in the coordination committee of the civil resistance movement from 1941 to 1944. For a period he served as treasurer for Milorg. He later chaired the Security service at the Norwegian legation in Stockholm. From 1945 to 1952 he managed the Directorate for Enemy Property. He was a board member of Norsk Hydro from 1946 to 1967.

== Awards and legacy ==
Poulsson was decorated Knight, First Class of the Order of St. Olav in 1953. He was a Knight of the Danish Order of Dannebrog, a Knight of the Swedish Order of the Polar Star, and Officer of the French Legion of Honour.
