= Erik Poulsson =

Erik Poulsson may refer to:

- Erik Ø. Poulsson (1904–1987), Norwegian businessman in the insurance industry
- Erik T. Poulsson (1897–1978), Norwegian lawyer, resistance member and civil servant
