= Vidkun Quisling =

Norwegian politician and Nazi collaborator (1887–1945)

- Quisling, c.1919

Minister President of the National Government of Norway
- In office 1 February 1942 – 9 May 1945 Serving with Josef Terboven
- Preceded by: Johan Nygaardsvold (as Prime Minister)
- Succeeded by: Johan Nygaardsvold (as Prime Minister)

Minister of Defence
- In office 12 May 1931 – 3 March 1933
- Prime Minister: Peder Kolstad; Jens Hundseid
- Preceded by: Torgeir Anderssen-Rysst
- Succeeded by: Jens Isak Kobro

Fører of the National Gathering
- In office 13 May 1933 – 8 May 1945
- Preceded by: Position established
- Succeeded by: Position abolished

Personal details
- Born: Vidkun Abraham Lauritz Jonssøn Quisling; 18 July 1887 Fyresdal, Telemark, Sweden-Norway
- Died: 24 October 1945 (aged 58) Akershus Fortress, Oslo, Norway
- Cause of death: Execution by firing squad
- Party: Nasjonal Samling (1933–45)
- Other political affiliations: Fatherland League (1930–33); Nordic People's Awakening in Norway (1930–31); Agrarian Party (1931–33)
- Spouses: Alexandra Andreevna Voronina; Maria Vasilijevna Quisling (disputed)
- Profession: Military officer, politician

Vidkun Abraham Lauritz Jonssøn Quisling (/ˈkwɪzlɪŋ/; Norwegian: [ˈʋɪ̂dkʉn ˈkʋɪ̂slɪŋ]; 18 July 1887 – 24 October 1945) was a Norwegian military officer, politician and Nazi collaborator who headed the puppet government of Norway during the country's occupation by Nazi Germany during World War II.

He first came to international prominence as a close collaborator of the explorer Fridtjof Nansen, and through organising humanitarian relief during the Russian famine of 1921 in Povolzhye. He was posted as a Norwegian diplomat to the Soviet Union, and for some time also managed British diplomatic affairs there. He returned to Norway in 1929 and served as minister of defence in the agrarian governments of Peder Kolstad (1931–1932) and Jens Hundseid (1932–1933).

In 1933, Quisling founded the fascist Nasjonal Samling (National Gathering). Although he gained some popularity after his attacks on the political left, his party failed to win any seats in the Storting, and by 1940, it was still little more than peripheral. On 9 April 1940, with the German invasion of Norway in progress, he attempted to seize power in the world's first radio-broadcast coup d'état but failed since the Germans sought to convince the recognised Norwegian government to legitimize the German occupation. On 1 February 1942, he formed a second government, approved by the Germans, and served as minister president. He headed the Norwegian state administration jointly with the German civilian administrator, Josef Terboven. His pro-Nazi puppet government, known as the Quisling regime, was dominated by ministers from Nasjonal Samling. The collaborationist government participated in Germany's war efforts and deported Jews out of the country to concentration camps in occupied Poland, where most were killed.

Quisling was put on trial during the legal purge in Norway after World War II. He was found guilty of charges including embezzlement, murder, and high treason against the Norwegian state, and was sentenced to death, a sentence that some criticized for its questionable legality. In addition, except for death sentences (including for retroactive verdicts) imposed by the Nazi occupation authorities, with Quisling's support, no death sentence had been executed since 1876, and capital punishment had been abolished upon independence in 1905. Quisling was executed by firing squad at Akershus Fortress, Oslo, on 24 October 1945. Since his death, he has come to be seen as one of European history's foremost traitors due to his collaboration with Nazi Germany. The term quisling has become a synonym for "collaborator" or "traitor" in several North European languages.

== Early life ==
=== Background ===
Vidkun Abraham Lauritz Jonssøn Quisling (Norwegian pronunciation) was born on 18 July 1887 in Fyresdal Municipality, in the Norwegian county of Telemark. He was the son of Church of Norway pastor and genealogist Jon Lauritz Qvisling and his wife Anna Caroline Bang, the daughter of Jørgen Bang, ship-owner and at the time the richest man in the town of Grimstad in South Norway. The elder Quisling had lectured in Grimstad in the 1870s; one of his pupils was Bang, whom he married on 28 May 1886, following a long engagement. The newly-wed couple promptly moved to Fyresdal, where Vidkun and his younger siblings were born.

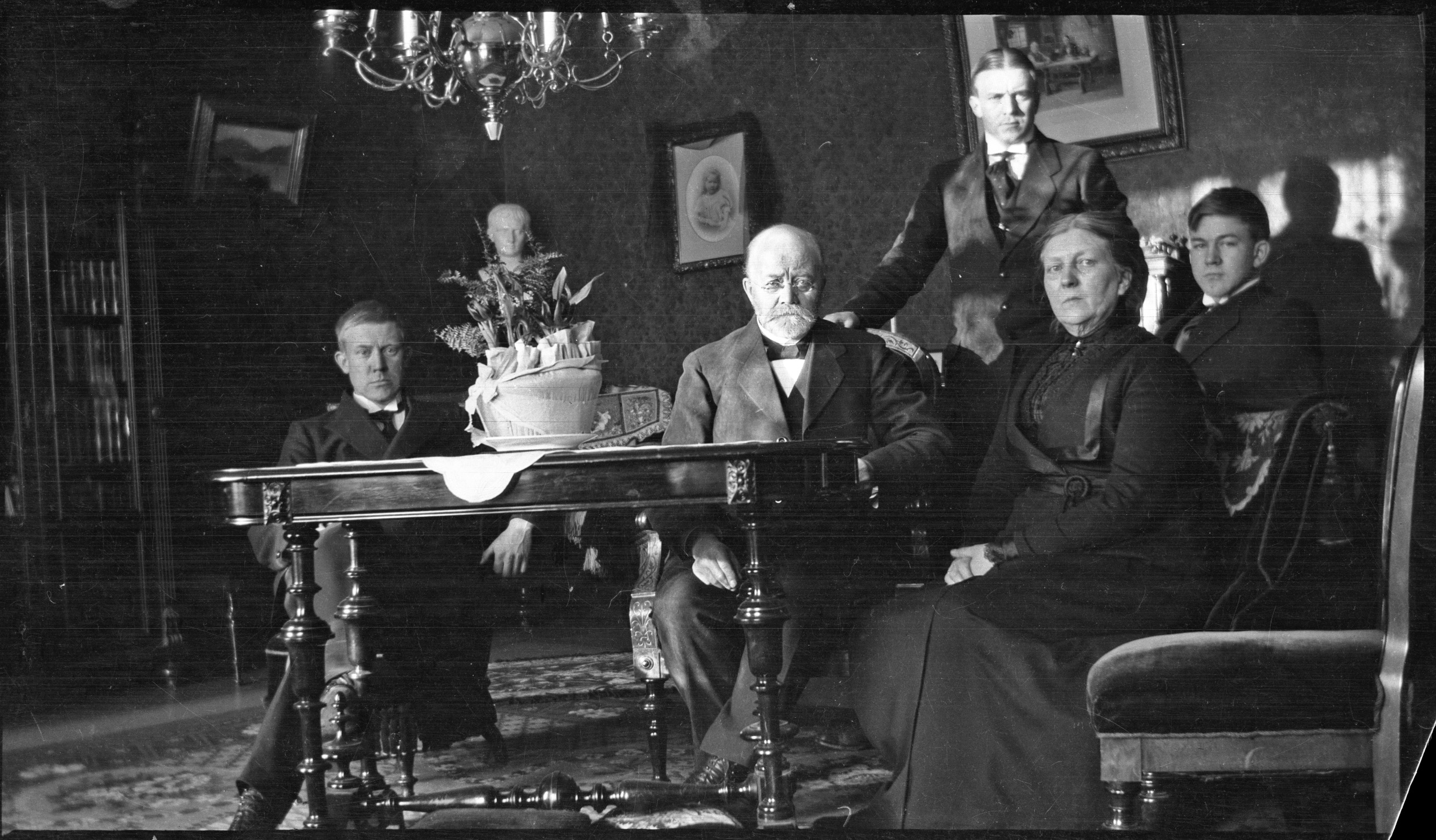
Vidkun Quisling (far left) with his family, c.1915

The family name derives from Quislinus, a Latinised name invented by Quisling's ancestor Lauritz Ibsen Quislin (1634–1703), based on the village of Kvislemark near Slagelse, Denmark, whence he had emigrated. Having two brothers and a sister, the young Quisling was "shy and quiet but also loyal and helpful, always friendly, occasionally breaking into a warm smile." Private letters later found by historians also indicate a warm and affectionate relationship between the family members. From 1893 to 1900, his father was a chaplain for the Strømsø borough in Drammen. Here, Vidkun went to school for the first time. He was bullied by other students at the school for his Telemark dialect, but proved a successful student. In 1900, the family moved to Skien when his father was appointed provost of the city.

Academically Quisling proved talented in humanities, particularly history, and natural sciences; he specialised in mathematics. At this point, however, his life had no clear direction. In 1905, Quisling enrolled at the Norwegian Military Academy, having received the highest entrance examination score of the 250 applicants that year. Transferring in 1906 to the Norwegian Military College, he graduated with the highest score since the college's inception in 1817, and was rewarded by an audience with Haakon VII, the King of Norway. On 1 November 1911, he joined the army General Staff. Norway was neutral in the First World War; Quisling detested the peace movement, though the high human cost of the war did temper his views.

In March 1918, he was sent to Russia as an attaché at the Norwegian legation in Petrograd, to take advantage of the five years he had spent studying the country. Though dismayed at the living conditions he experienced, Quisling nonetheless concluded that "the Bolsheviks have got an extraordinarily strong hold on Russian society" and marvelled at how Leon Trotsky had managed to mobilise the Red Army forces so well; he asserted that by contrast, in granting too many rights to the people of Russia, the Russian Provisional Government under Alexander Kerensky had brought about its own downfall. When the legation was recalled in December 1918, Quisling became the Norwegian military's expert on Russian affairs.

== Travels ==
=== Paris, Eastern Europe, and Norway ===
In September 1919, Quisling departed Norway to become an intelligence officer with the Norwegian delegation in Helsinki, a post that combined diplomacy and politics. In the autumn of 1921, Quisling left Norway once again, this time at the request of explorer and humanitarian Fridtjof Nansen, and in January 1922 arrived in the Ukrainian capital Kharkiv to help with the League of Nations humanitarian relief effort there. Highlighting the massive mismanagement of the area and the death toll of approximately ten thousand a day, Quisling produced a report that attracted aid and demonstrated his administrative skills, as well as his dogged determination to get what he wanted.

Quisling replied [that] the Russian people needed wise leadership and proper training [that they suffered from] indifference, a lack of clearly defined goals with conviction and a happy-go-lucky attitude [and that] it is impossible to accomplish anything without willpower, determination and concentration.

— Alexandra Voronina recounts a conversation with her soon-to-be husband, Yourieff 2007, p. 93

On 21 August 1922, he married the Russian Alexandra Andreevna Voronina. Alexandra wrote in her memoirs that Quisling declared his love for her, but from his letters home and investigations undertaken by his cousins, Quisling merely seemed to have wanted to lift the girl out of poverty by providing her with a Norwegian passport and financial security.

Having left Ukraine in September 1922, Quisling and Alexandra returned to Kharkiv in February 1923 to prolong aid efforts, with Nansen describing Quisling's work as "absolutely indispensable." In March 1923, Alexandra was pregnant, and Quisling insisted on her having an abortion, which greatly distressed her. Quisling found the situation much improved and, with no fresh challenges, found it a more boring trip than his last. He did however meet Maria Vasiljevna Pasetchnikova (Russian: Мари́я Васи́льевна Па́сечникова), a Ukrainian more than ten years his junior. Her diaries from the time "indicate a blossoming love affair" during the summer of 1923, despite Quisling's marriage to Alexandra the year before. She recalled that she was impressed by his fluent command of the Russian language, his Aryan appearance, and his gracious demeanour. Quisling later claimed to have married Pasetchnikova in Kharkiv on 10 September 1923, although no legal documentation has been discovered. Quisling's biographer, Hans Fredrik Dahl, believes that in all likelihood the second marriage was never official. Regardless, the couple behaved as though they were married, claimed Alexandra was their daughter, and celebrated their wedding anniversary. Soon after September 1923, the aid mission came to an end and the trio left Ukraine, planning to spend a year in Paris. Maria wanted to see Western Europe; Quisling wanted to get some rest following bouts of stomach pain that had lasted all winter.

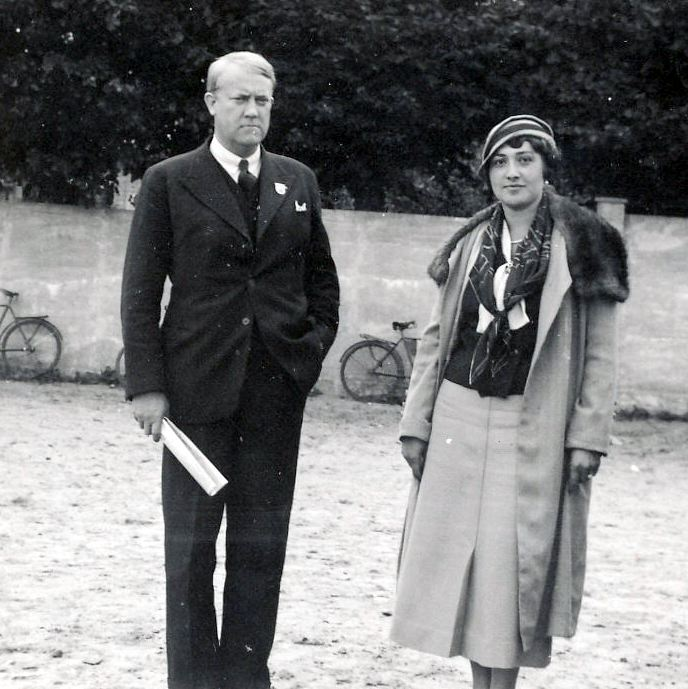
Quisling and his second wife, Maria

The stay in Paris required a temporary discharge from the army, which Quisling slowly grew to understand was permanent: army cutbacks meant that there would be no position available for him when he returned. (Note: Increasingly bitter over the treatment he had received from the military, he eventually took up a post in the reserves on the reduced salary of a captain, and received a promotion to major in 1930.) Quisling devoted much of his time in the French capital to study, reading works of political theory and working on his philosophical project, which he called Universism. On 2 October 1923, he persuaded the Oslo daily newspaper Tidens Tegn to publish an article he had written calling for diplomatic recognition of the Soviet government. Quisling's stay in Paris did not last as long as planned, and in late 1923 he started work on Nansen's new repatriation project in the Balkans, arriving in Sofia in November.

The next two months he spent travelling constantly with his wife Maria. In January, Maria returned to Paris to look after Alexandra, who took on the role of the couple's foster-daughter; Quisling joined them in February. In the summer of 1924, the trio returned to Norway where Alexandra subsequently left to live with an aunt in Nice and never returned. Although Quisling promised to provide for her well-being, his payments were irregular, and over the coming years he would miss a number of opportunities to visit.

Back in Norway, and to his later embarrassment, Quisling found himself drawn into the communist Norwegian labour movement. Among other policies, he fruitlessly advocated a people's militia to protect the country against reactionary attacks, and asked members of the movement whether they would like to know what information the General Staff had on them, but he got no response. Although this brief attachment to the far-left seems unlikely given Quisling's later political direction, Dahl suggests that, following a conservative childhood, he was by this time "unemployed and dispirited ... deeply resentful of the General Staff ... [and] in the process of becoming politically more radical." Dahl adds that Quisling's political views at this time could be summarised as "a fusion of socialism and nationalism," with definite sympathies for the Soviets in Russia.

=== Russia and the rouble scandal ===
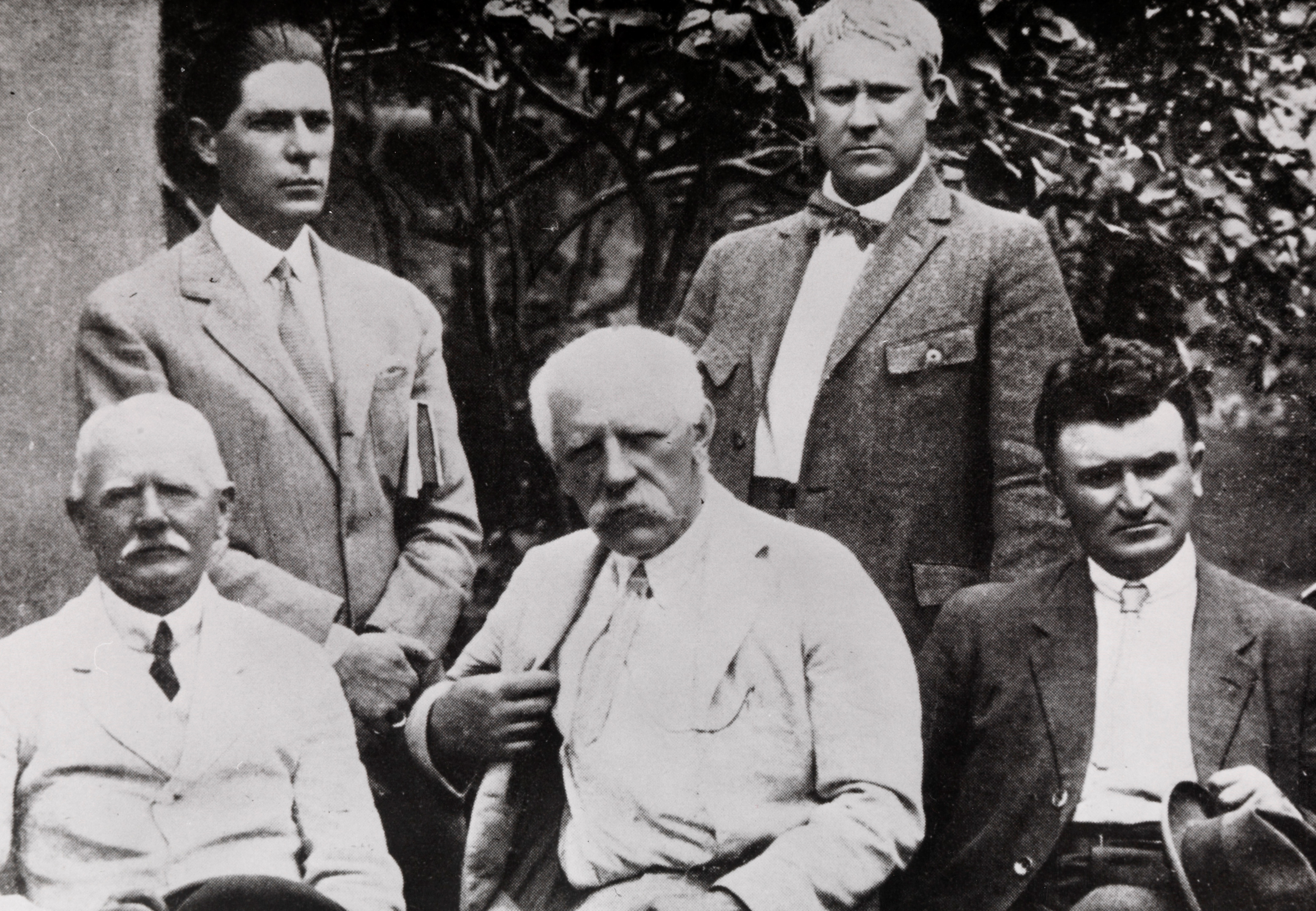
The Armenia commission of the League of Nations. 19 June 1925. From left, sitting, are C.E. Dupuis, Fridtjof Nansen, and G. Carle; standing are Pio Le Savio, and Vidkun Quisling.

In June 1925, Nansen once again provided Quisling with employment. The pair began a tour of Armenia, where they hoped to help repatriate Armenians, including those who survived the Armenian genocide, via a number of projects proposed for funding by the League of Nations. Despite Quisling's substantial efforts, however, the projects were all rejected.

In May 1926, Quisling found another job with long-time friend and fellow Norwegian Frederik Prytz in Moscow, working as a liaison between Prytz and the Soviet authorities who owned half of Prytz's firm, Onega Wood. He stayed in the job until Prytz prepared to close down the business in early 1927, when Quisling found new employment as a diplomat. British diplomatic affairs in Russia were being managed by Norway, and he became their new legation secretary; Maria joined him late in 1928.

A massive scandal broke when Quisling and Prytz were accused of using diplomatic channels to smuggle millions of roubles onto the black markets, a much-repeated claim that was later used to support a charge of "moral bankruptcy," but neither it nor the charge that Quisling spied for the British has ever been substantiated.

The harder line now developing in Russian politics led Quisling to distance himself from Bolshevism. The Soviet government had rejected outright his Armenian proposals, and obstructed an attempt by Nansen to help with the 1928 Ukrainian famine. Quisling took these rebuffs as a personal insult; in 1929, with the British now keen to take back control of their own diplomatic affairs, he left Russia.

He was appointed a Commander of the Order of the British Empire (CBE) for his services to Britain, an honour revoked by King George VI in 1940. By this time, Quisling had also been awarded the Romanian Crown Order and the Yugoslav Order of St. Sava for his earlier humanitarian efforts.

== Early political career ==
=== Final return to Norway ===
Having spent nine of the previous twelve years abroad, but with no practical experience in party politics outside the Norwegian Army, Quisling returned to Norway in December 1929, bringing with him a plan for change he termed Norsk Aktion ("Norwegian Action"). Like Action Française of the French right, it advocated radical constitutional changes. The Parliament of Norway, or Storting, was to become bicameral with the second chamber made up of elected representatives from the working population. Quisling focused more on organisation than the practicalities of government; for instance, all members of Norsk Aktion were to have their own designation in a militaristic hierarchy.

Quisling next sold a large number of antiques and works of art that he had acquired cheaply in post-revolutionary Russia. His collection stretched to some 200 paintings, including works claimed to be by Rembrandt, Goya, Cézanne, and numerous other masters. The collection, including "veritable treasures," had been insured for almost 300,000 kroner. In the spring of 1930, he again joined up with Prytz, who was back in Norway. They participated in regular group meetings that included middle-aged officers and business people, since described as "the textbook definition of a Fascist initiative group," through which Prytz appeared determined to launch Quisling into politics.

After Nansen died on 13 May 1930, Quisling used his friendship with the editor of the Tidens Tegn newspaper to get his analysis of Nansen onto the front page. The article was entitled "Politiske tanker ved Fridtjof Nansens død" ("Political Thoughts on the Death of Fridtjof Nansen") and was published on 24 May. In the article, he outlined ten points that would complete Nansen's vision as applied to Norway, among them "strong and just government", and a "greater emphasis on race and heredity." This theme was followed up in his new book, Russia and Ourselves, which was serialised in Tidens Tegn during the autumn of 1930. Advocating war against Bolshevism, the book catapulted Quisling into the political limelight. Despite his earlier ambivalence, he took up a seat on the Oslo board of the previously Nansen-led Fatherland League. Meanwhile, he and Prytz founded a new political movement, Nordisk folkereisning i Norge ("Nordic popular rising in Norway"), with a central committee of 31 and Quisling as its fører—a one-man executive committee—though Quisling seemed to have had no particular attachment to the term. The first meeting of the league took place on 17 March 1931, stating the purpose of the movement was to "eliminate the imported and depraved communist insurgency."

=== Defence minister ===
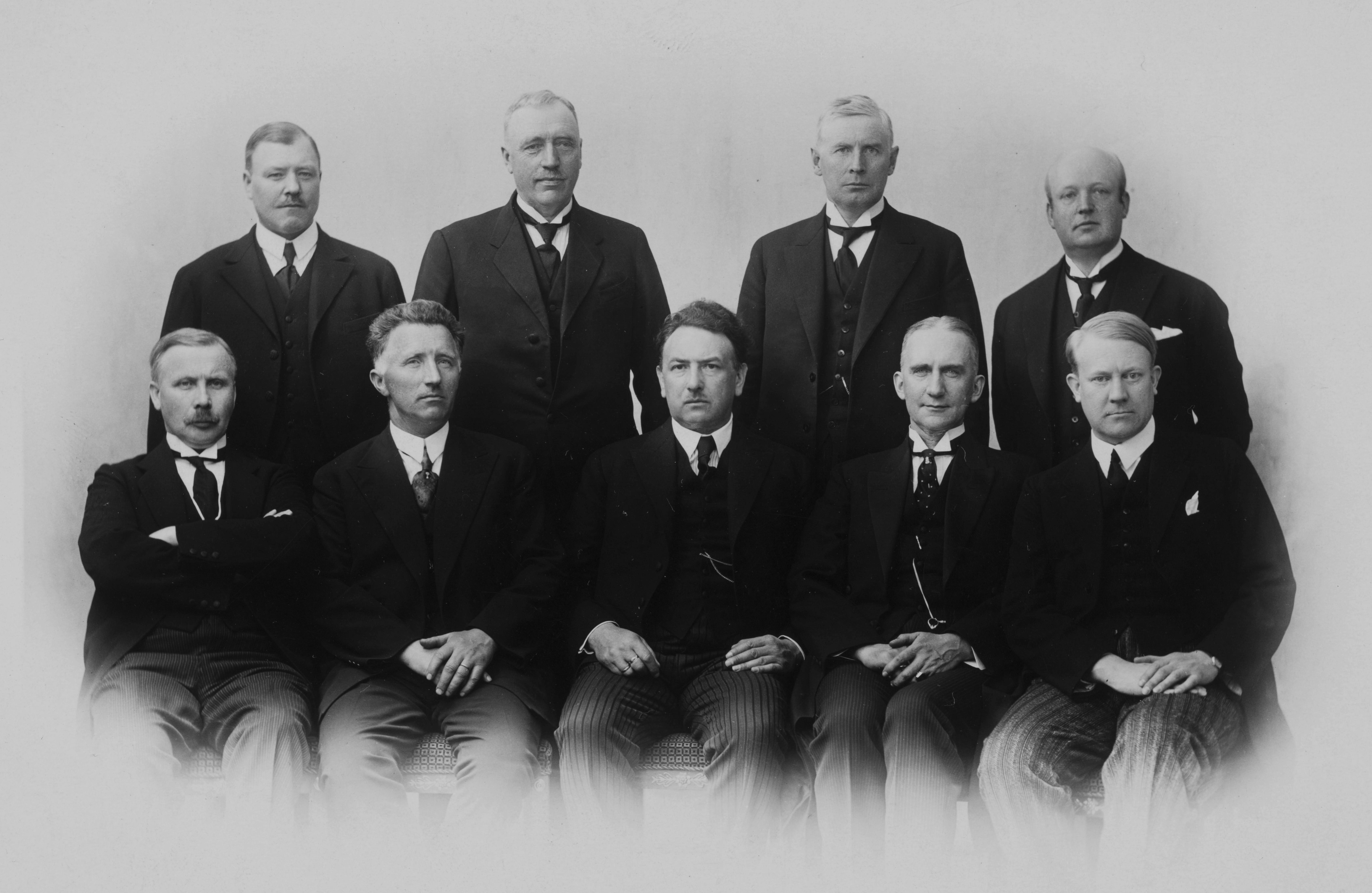
Quisling (seated, right) as defence minister in the Kolstad government in 1931

Quisling left Nordisk folkereisning i Norge in May 1931 to serve as defence minister in the Agrarian government of Peder Kolstad, despite being neither an Agrarian nor a friend of Kolstad. He had been suggested to Kolstad for the post by Thorvald Aadahl, editor of the Agrarian newspaper Nationen, who was in turn influenced by Prytz. The appointment came as a surprise to many in the Parliament of Norway.

Quisling's first action in the post was to deal with the aftermath of the Battle of Menstad, an "extremely bitter" labour dispute, by sending in troops. After narrowly avoiding criticism by the left wing over his handling of the dispute, and the revelation of his earlier "militia" plans, Quisling turned his attention to the perceived threat posed by communists. He created a list of the Revolutionäre Gewerkschafts Opposition ("Revolutionary Trade Union Opposition") leadership, who had been the alleged agitators at Menstad; a number of them were eventually charged with subversion and violence against the police.

Quisling's policies also resulted in the establishment of a permanent militia called the Leidang which, unlike the body he had previously planned, was to be counter-revolutionary. Despite the ready availability of junior officers in the reserve following defence cuts, only seven units were established in 1934, and funding restrictions meant that the enterprise included less than a thousand men before it faded away. Sometime during the period 1930–33, Quisling's first wife, Alexandra, received notice of the annulment of her marriage to him.

In mid-1932 Nordisk folkereisning i Norge was forced to confirm that even though Quisling remained in the cabinet, he would not become a member of the party. They further stated that the party programme had no basis in fascism of any kind, including the National Socialism model. This did not dampen criticism of Quisling, who remained constantly in the headlines, although he was gradually earning a reputation as a disciplined and efficient administrator. After he was attacked in his office by a knife-wielding assailant who threw ground pepper in his face on 2 February 1932, some newspapers, instead of focusing on the attack itself, suggested that the assailant had been the jealous husband of one of Quisling's cleaners; others, especially those aligned with the Labour Party, posited that the whole thing had been staged. In November 1932, Labour politician Johan Nygaardsvold put this theory to Parliament, prompting suggestions that charges of slander be brought against him. No charges were brought, and the identity of the assailant has never been confirmed. Quisling later indicated it was an attempt to steal military papers recently left by Swedish Lieutenant Colonel Wilhelm Kleen. (Note: Attempts to establish exactly what the Oslo authorities managed to achieve in trying to find the assailant have been hampered by the loss of the original case file. Quisling himself seemed to have rejected the idea that the plot had been masterminded by an important military power such as the Russians or Germans.) The so-called "pepper affair" served to polarise opinion about Quisling, and government fears grew concerning reasonably open Soviet elements in Norway who had been active in promoting industrial unrest.

Following Kolstad's death in March 1932, Quisling retained his post as defence minister in the second Agrarian government under Jens Hundseid for political reasons, though they remained in bitter opposition throughout. Just as he had been under Kolstad, Quisling was involved in many of the spats that characterised Hundseid's government. On 8 April that year, Quisling had a chance to defend himself over the pepper affair in Parliament, but instead used the opportunity to attack the Labour and Communist parties, claiming that named members were criminals and "enemies of our fatherland and our people." Support for Quisling from right-wing elements in Norwegian society rocketed overnight, and 153 distinguished signatories called for Quisling's claims to be investigated. In the coming months, tens of thousands of Norwegians followed suit and Quisling's summer was full of speeches to packed political rallies. In Parliament, however, Quisling's speech was viewed as political suicide; not only was his evidence weak, but questions were raised as to why the information had not been handed over much sooner if the revolutionary threat were so serious.

=== Popular party leader ===
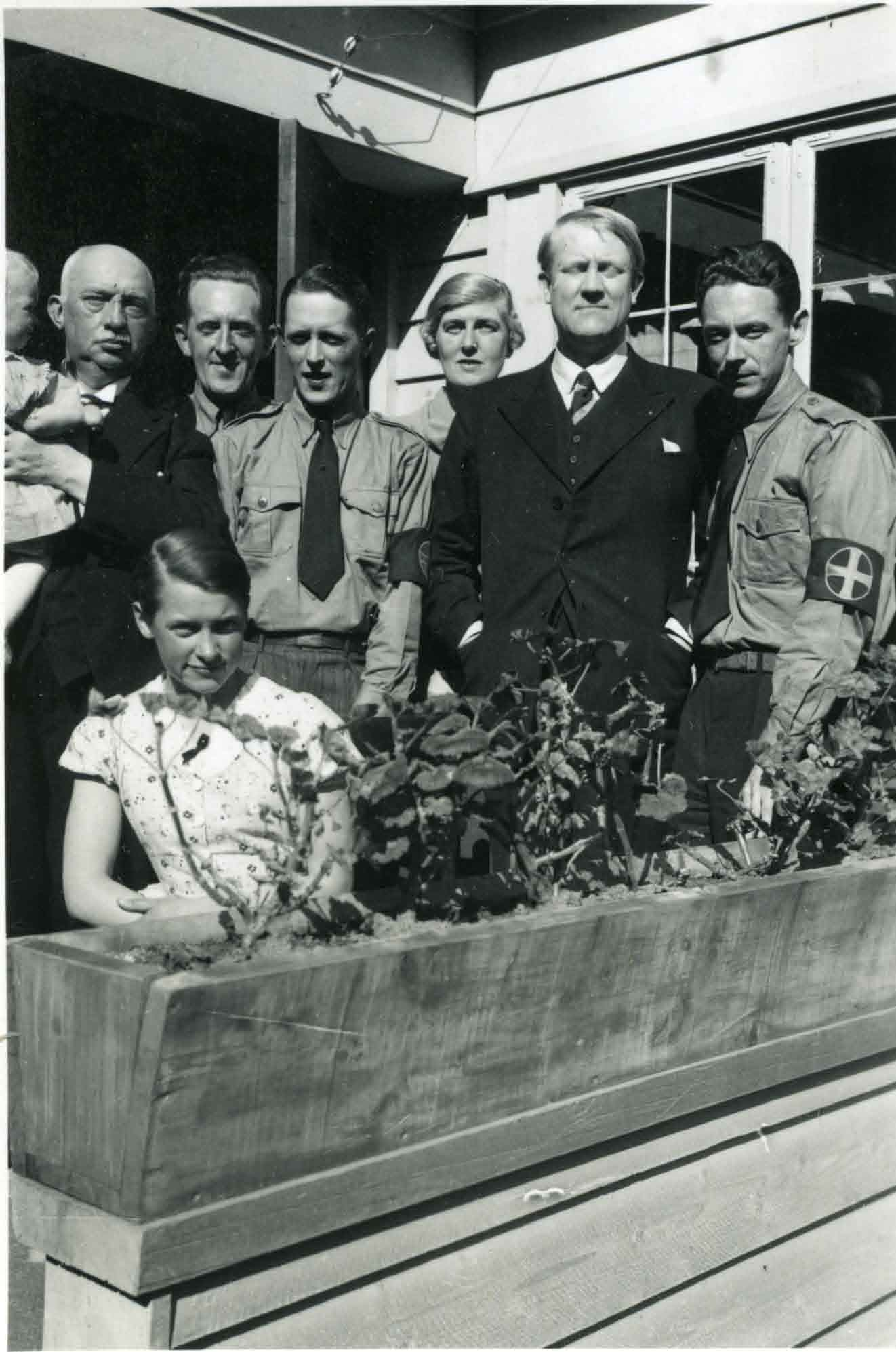
Vidkun Quisling together with some NS supporters

Over the course of 1932 and into 1933, Prytz's influence over Nordisk folkereisning i Norge weakened and lawyer Johan Bernhard Hjort assumed the leadership role. Hjort was keen to collaborate with Quisling because of his new-found popularity, and they devised a new programme of right-wing policies involving proscription of revolutionary parties including those funded by foreign bodies such as Comintern, the suspension of the voting rights for people in receipt of social welfare, agricultural debt relief, and an audit of public finances. In 1932, during the Kullmann Affair, Quisling turned on the prime minister for questioning his hard-line stance over pacifist agitator Captain Olaf Kullmann. In a memorandum laying out his proposals for economic and social reform distributed to the entire cabinet, Quisling called for the prime minister to stand down. As the government began to collapse, Quisling's personal popularity reached new heights; he was referred to as "man of the year," and there were expectations of forthcoming electoral success.

Despite the new programme, some of Quisling's circle still favoured a cabinet coup. He later said he had even considered the use of force to overthrow the government but, in late February, it was the Liberal Party that brought them down. With the assistance of Hjort and Prytz, Nordisk folkereisning i Norge quickly became the political party Nasjonal Samling (NS; "National Unity"), ready to contest the forthcoming October parliamentary election. Quisling was mildly disappointed and would have preferred to head a national movement, not just one of seven political parties. NS soon afterwards announced it would support candidates from other parties if they supported its key aim of "establishing a strong and stable national government independent of ordinary party politics." Although not an overnight success in the already crowded political spectrum, the party slowly gained support. With its Nazi-inspired belief in the central authority of a strong Führer, as well as its powerful propaganda elements, it gained support from many among the Oslo upper classes, and began to give the impression that "big money" lay behind it.

Increased support also materialised when the Bygdefolkets Krisehjelp, the Norwegian Farmers' Aid Association, sought financial aid from NS, who in turn gained political influence and a useful existing network of well-trained party officers. Quisling's party never managed a grand anti-socialist coalition, however, in part because of competition from the Conservative Party for right-wing votes. Though Quisling remained unable to demonstrate any skill as an orator, his reputation for scandal nonetheless ensured that the electorate was aware of NS's existence. As a result, the party showed only moderate success in the October 1933 election, with 27,850 votes—approximately two per cent of the national vote, and about three and a half per cent of the vote in constituencies where it fielded candidates. This made it the fifth largest party in Norway, out-polling the Communists but not the Conservative, Labour, Liberal or Agrarian parties, and failing to secure a single seat in Parliament.

=== Fører of a party in decline ===
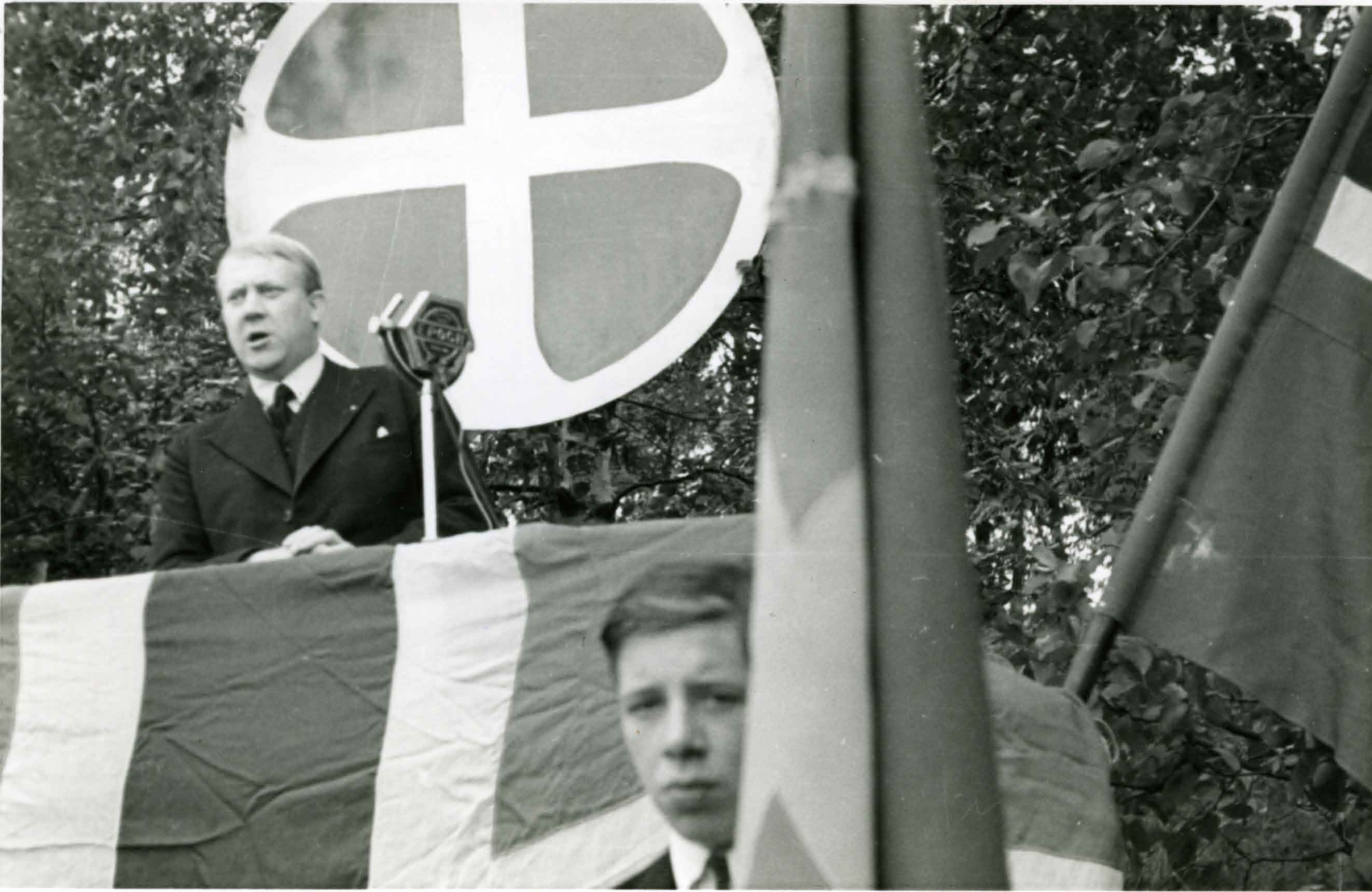
Quisling on the podium during a party meeting in the 1930s

After the underwhelming election results, Quisling's attitude to negotiation and compromise hardened. A final attempt to form a coalition of the right in March 1934 came to nothing, and from late 1933, Quisling's NS began to carve out its own form of national socialism. With no leader in Parliament, however, the party struggled to introduce the constitutional reform bill needed to achieve its lofty ambitions. When Quisling tried to introduce the bill directly, it was swiftly rejected, and the party went into decline. In the summer of 1935, headlines quoted Quisling telling opponents that "heads [would] roll" as soon as he achieved power. The threat irreparably damaged the image of his party, and over the following few months several high-ranking members resigned, including Kai Fjell and Quisling's brother Jørgen.

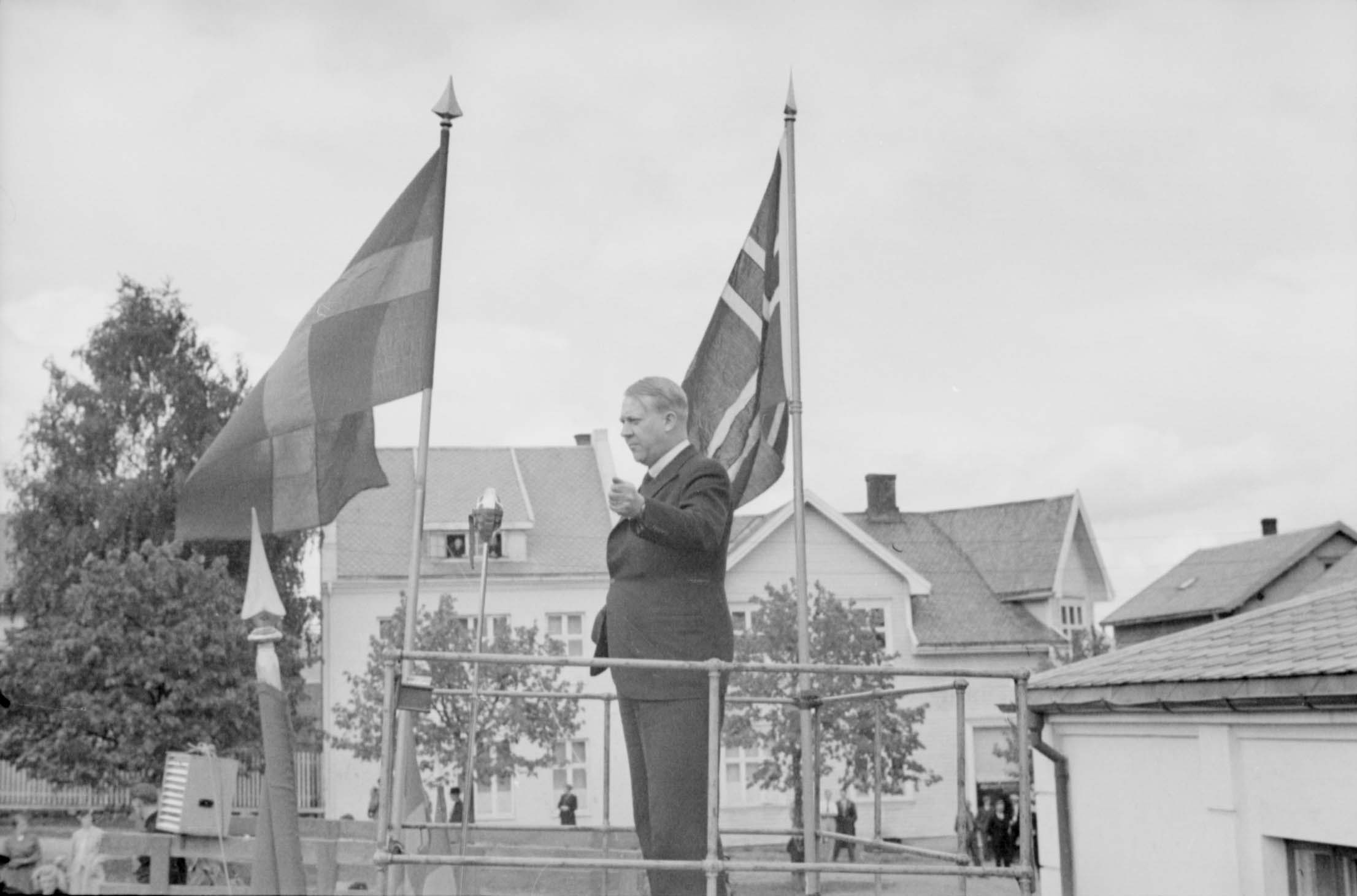
Quisling speaks during a trip to Setesdal, Norway, probably in 1936

Quisling began to familiarise himself with the international fascist movement, attending the 1934 Montreux Fascist conference in December. For his party, the association with Italian fascism could not have come at a worse time, so soon after headlines of illegal Italian incursions into Abyssinia. On his return trip from Montreux, he met Nazi ideologue and foreign policy theorist Alfred Rosenberg, and though he preferred to see his own policies as a synthesis of Italian fascism and German Nazism, by the time of the 1936 elections, Quisling had in part become the "Norwegian Hitler" that his opponents had long accused him of being. Part of this was due to his hardening antisemitic stance, associating Judaism with Marxism, liberalism, and, increasingly, anything else he found objectionable, and part as a result of NS's growing similarity to the German Nazi Party. Despite receiving an unexpected boost when the Norwegian government acceded to Soviet demands to arrest Leon Trotsky, the party's election campaign never gained momentum. Although Quisling sincerely believed he had the support of around 100,000 voters, and declared to his party that they would win an absolute minimum of ten seats, NS managed to poll just 26,577, fewer than in 1933 when they had fielded candidates in only half the districts. Under this pressure, the party split in two, with Hjort leading the breakaway group; although fewer than fifty members left immediately, many more drifted away during 1937.

Dwindling party membership created many problems for Quisling, especially financial ones. For years he had been in financial difficulties and reliant on his inheritance, while increasing numbers of his paintings were found to be copies when he tried to sell them. Vidkun and his brother Arne sold one Frans Hals painting for just four thousand dollars, believing it to be a copy and not the fifty-thousand-dollar artwork they had once thought it to be, only to see it reclassified as an original and revalued at a hundred thousand dollars. In the difficult circumstances of the Great Depression, even originals did not raise as much as Quisling had hoped. His disillusionment with Norwegian society was furthered by news of the planned constitutional reform of 1938, which would extend the parliamentary term from three to four years with immediate effect, a move Quisling bitterly opposed.

== World War II ==
=== Coming of war ===
In 1939, Quisling turned his attention towards Norway's preparations for the anticipated European war, which he believed involved a drastic increase in the country's defence spending to guarantee its neutrality. Meanwhile, Quisling presented lectures entitled "The Jewish problem in Norway" and supported Adolf Hitler in what appeared to be growing future conflict. Despite condemning Kristallnacht, he sent the German leader a fiftieth-birthday greeting thanking him for "saving Europe from Bolshevism and Jewish domination". Quisling also contended that should a British-Soviet alliance make neutrality impossible, Norway would have "to go with Germany." Invited to the country in the summer of 1939, he began a tour of a number of German and Danish cities. He was received particularly well in Germany, which promised funds to boost NS's standing in Norway, and hence spread pro-Nazi sentiment. When war broke out on 1 September 1939, Quisling felt vindicated by both the event and the immediate superiority displayed by the German army. He remained outwardly confident that, despite its size, his party would soon become the centre of political attention.

For the next nine months, Quisling continued to lead a party that was at best peripheral to Norwegian politics. He was nonetheless active, and in October 1939 he worked with Prytz on an ultimately unsuccessful plan for peace between Britain, France and Germany and their eventual participation in a new economic union. Quisling also mused on how Germany ought to go on the offensive against its ally the Soviet Union, and on 9 December travelled to Germany to present his multi-faceted plans. After impressing German officials, he won an audience with Hitler himself, scheduled for 14 December, whereupon he received firm advice from his contacts that the most useful thing he could do would be to ask for Hitler's help with a pro-German coup in Norway, (Note: Quisling considered the fourth and constitutionally dubious session of the Parliament of Norway, due to open on 10 January 1940, as the mostly likely time for Nasjonal Samling to face an exploitable crisis. During 1939 he had firmed up a list of candidates for an incoming government.) that would let the Germans use Norway as a naval base. Thereafter, Norway would maintain official neutrality as long as possible, and finally the country would fall under German rather than British control. It is not clear how much Quisling himself understood about the strategic implications of such a move, and he instead relied on his future Minister of Domestic Affairs Albert Hagelin, who was fluent in German, to put the relevant arguments to German officials in Berlin during pre-meeting talks, even though Hagelin was prone to damaging exaggeration at times. Quisling and his German contacts almost certainly went away with different views as to whether they had agreed upon the necessity of a German invasion.

On 14 December 1939, Quisling met Hitler. The German leader promised to respond to any British invasion of Norway (Plan R 4), perhaps pre-emptively, with a German counter-invasion, but found Quisling's plans for both a Norwegian coup and an Anglo-German peace unduly optimistic. Nonetheless, Quisling would still receive funds to bolster NS. (Note: Immediately after the meeting on 14 December, Hitler ordered his staff to draw up preparations for an invasion of Norway.) The two men met again four days later, and afterwards Quisling wrote a memorandum that explicitly told Hitler that he did not consider himself a National Socialist. As German machinations continued, Quisling was intentionally kept in the dark. He was also incapacitated by a severe bout of illness, probably nephritis in both kidneys, for which he refused hospitalisation. Though he returned to work on 13 March 1940, he remained ill for several weeks.

In the meantime, the Altmark incident complicated Norway's efforts to maintain its neutrality. Hitler himself remained in two minds over whether an occupation of Norway should require an invitation from the Norwegian government. Finally, Quisling received his summons on 31 March, and reluctantly travelled to Copenhagen to meet with Nazi intelligence officers who asked him for information on Norwegian defences and defence protocols. He returned to Norway on 6 April and, on 8 April, the British Operation Wilfred commenced, bringing Norway into the war. With Allied forces in Norway, Quisling expected a characteristically swift German response.

=== German invasion and coup d'état ===
In the early hours of 9 April 1940, Germany invaded Norway by air and sea in "Operation Weserübung", or "Operation Weser Exercise", intending to capture King Haakon VII and the government of Prime Minister Johan Nygaardsvold. However, alert to the possibility of invasion, Conservative President of the Parliament C. J. Hambro arranged for their evacuation to Hamar in the east of the country. The Blücher, a German cruiser which carried most of the personnel intended to take over Norway's administration, was sunk by cannon fire and torpedoes from Oscarsborg Fortress in the Oslofjord. (Note: Dahl suggests that the mix-up was in part due to Quisling's earlier statement to the Germans that he "did not believe" the Norwegian sea defences would open fire without previous orders to do so.) The Germans had expected the government to surrender and to have its replacement ready; neither happened, although the invasion itself continued. After hours of discussion, Quisling and his German counterparts decided that an immediate coup was necessary, though this was not the preferred option either of Germany's ambassador Curt Bräuer or of the German Foreign Ministry.

In the afternoon, German liaison-person Hans-Wilhelm Scheidt told Quisling that should he set up a government, it would have Hitler's personal approval. Quisling drew up a list of ministers and, although the legitimate government had merely relocated some 150 km (93 mi) to Elverum, accused it of having "fled". (Note: The option of a "Danish solution"—welcoming the invaders in order to avoid conflict—was still on the table. In this way, the Nazis were avoiding choosing between the rival centres of power. This became impossible only after Quisling's announcement at 19:30.)

Meanwhile, the Germans occupied Oslo and at 17:30 Norwegian radio (NRK) ceased broadcasting at the request of the occupying forces. With German support, at approximately 19:30, Quisling entered the NRK studios in Oslo and proclaimed the formation of a new government with himself as prime minister. He also revoked an earlier order to mobilise against the German invasion. He still lacked legitimacy. Two of his orders—the first to his friend Colonel Hans Sommerfeldt Hiorth, the commanding officer of the army regiment at Elverum, to arrest the government, and the second to Kristian Welhaven, Oslo's chief of police—were both ignored. At 22:00, Quisling resumed broadcasting, repeating his earlier message and reading out a list of new ministers. Hitler lent his support as promised, and recognised the new Norwegian government under Quisling within 24 hours. Norwegian batteries were still firing on the German invasion force, and at 03:00 on 10 April, Quisling acceded to a German request to halt the resistance of the Bolærne fortress. (Note: Though now accepted, this charge was later one of the few for which the jury at Quisling's trial did not find sufficient evidence.) As a result of actions such as these, it was claimed at the time that Quisling's seizure of power in a puppet government had been part of the German plan all along.

Quisling now reached the high-water mark of his political power. On 10 April, Bräuer travelled to Elverum where the legitimate Nygaardsvold government now sat. On Hitler's orders, he demanded that King Haakon appoint Quisling head of a new government, thereby securing a peaceful transition of power and giving legal sanction to the occupation. Haakon rejected this demand. Later, in a meeting with his cabinet, Haakon told his ministers that neither the people nor the Storting had confidence in Quisling. The king went further, saying that he could not appoint Quisling as prime minister, and would abdicate before appointing a Quisling-led government. Hearing this, the government unanimously voted to support the King's stance. It formally advised him not to appoint any government headed by Quisling, and urged the people to continue their resistance. With his popular support gone, Quisling ceased to be of use to Hitler. Germany retracted its support for his rival government, preferring instead to build up its own independent governing commission. In this way, Quisling was manoeuvred out of power by Bräuer and a coalition of his former allies, including Hjort, who now saw him as a liability. Even his political allies, including Prytz, deserted him.

In return, Hitler wrote to Quisling thanking him for his efforts and guaranteeing him some sort of position in the new government. The transfer of power on these terms was duly enacted on 15 April, with Hitler still confident the Administrative Council would receive the backing of the King. Quisling's domestic and international reputation both hit new lows, casting him as both a traitor and a failure.

=== Head of the government ===
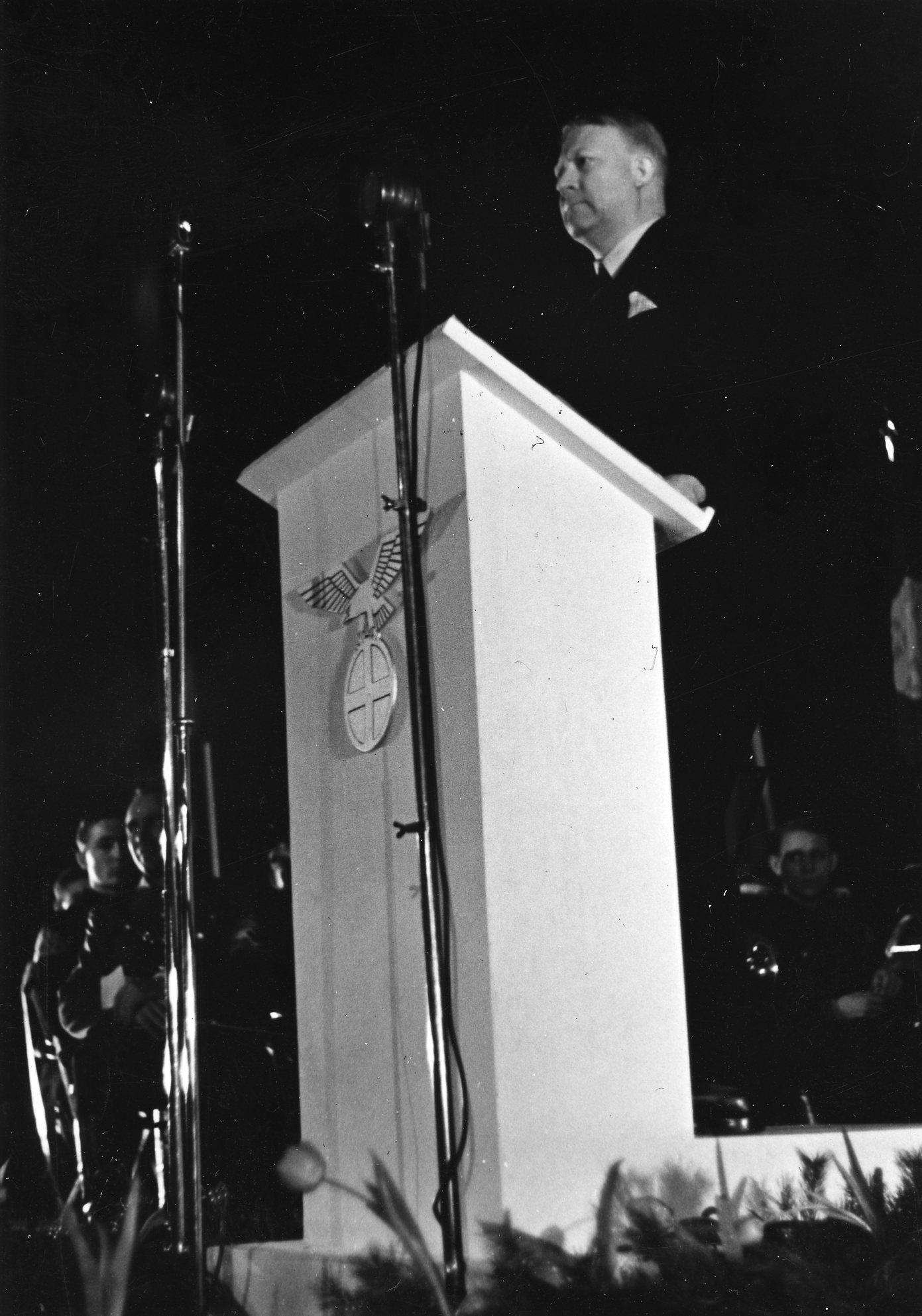
Quisling in Oslo in 1941

Once the King had declared the German commission unlawful, it became clear that he would never be won over. An impatient Hitler appointed a German, Josef Terboven, as the new Norwegian Reichskommissar, or governor-general, on 24 April, reporting directly to him. Despite Hitler's assurances, Terboven wanted to make sure that there would be no room in the government for the NS nor its leader Quisling, with whom he did not get along. Terboven eventually accepted a certain NS presence in the government during June, but remained unconvinced about Quisling. As a result, on 25 June, Terboven forced Quisling to step down as leader of the Nasjonal Samling and take a temporary leave of absence in Germany. Quisling remained there until 20 August, while Rosenberg and Admiral Erich Raeder, whom he had met on his earlier visit to Berlin, negotiated on his behalf. In the end, Quisling returned "in triumph," having won Hitler over in a meeting on 16 August. The Reichskommissar would now have to accommodate Quisling as leader of the government, then allow him to rebuild the NS, and bring more of his men into the cabinet. Terboven complied and addressed the Norwegian people in a radio broadcast in which he stated that the NS would be the only political party allowed.

By the end of 1940 the monarchy had been suspended, although the Parliament of Norway and a body resembling a cabinet remained. The NS, the only pro-German party, would be cultivated, but Terboven's Reichskommissariat would keep power in the meantime. Quisling would serve as acting prime minister, and ten of the thirteen "cabinet" ministers were to come from his party. He set out on a programme of wiping out "the destructive principles of the French Revolution", including pluralism and parliamentary rule. This reached into local politics, whereby mayors who switched their allegiance to the NS were rewarded with much greater powers. Investments were made in heavily censored cultural programmes, though the press remained theoretically free. To bolster the survival chances of the Nordic genotype, contraception was severely restricted. Quisling's party experienced a rise in membership to a little over 30,000, but despite his optimism it never reached 40,000.

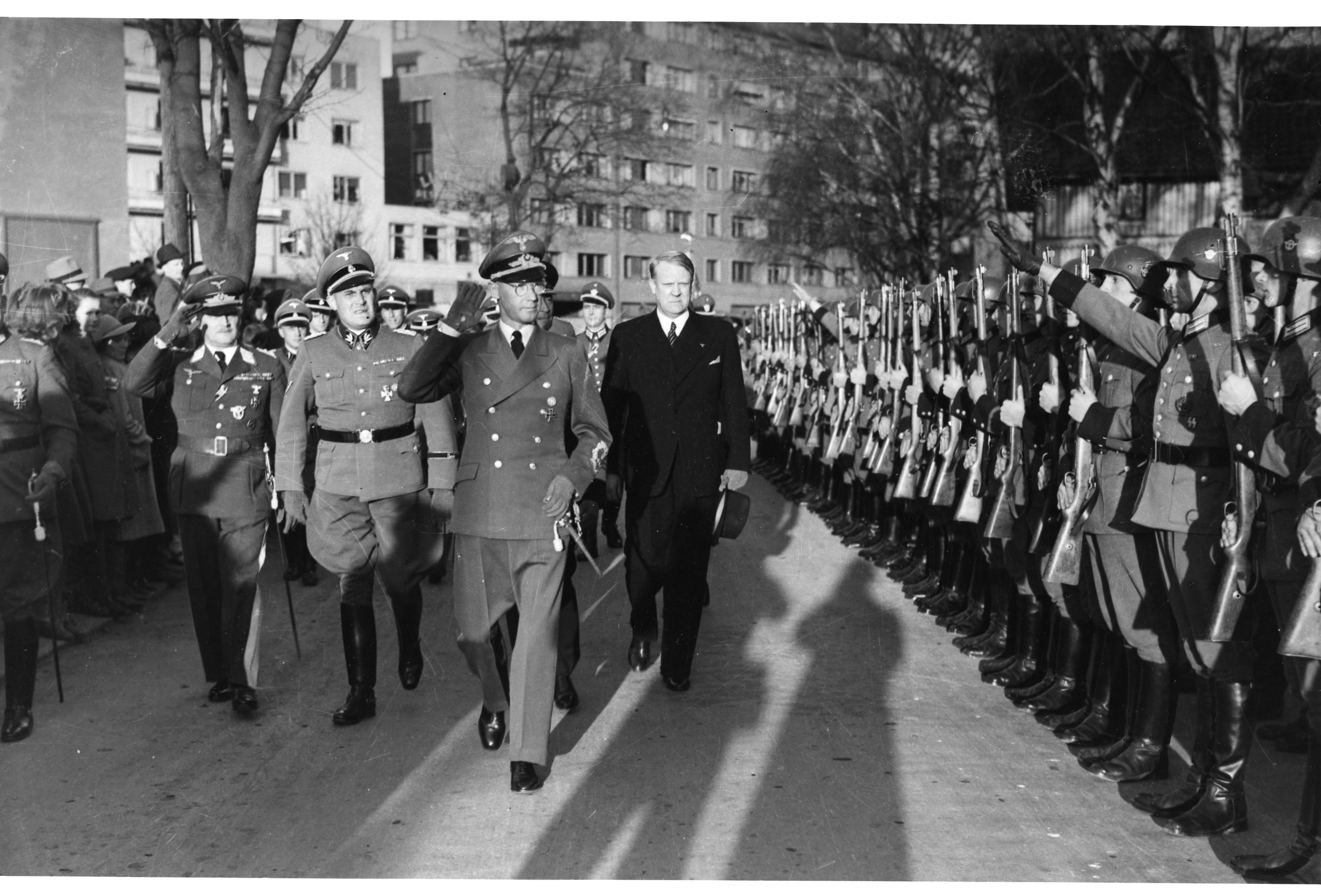
German occupation forces in Norway during World War II, along with assembled German order police soldiers and Quisling, before a German propaganda event at the Colosseum cinema in Oslo, May 1941

On 5 December 1940, Quisling flew to Berlin to negotiate the future of Norway's independence. By the time he returned on 13 December, he had agreed to raise volunteers to fight with the German Schutzstaffel (SS). In January 1941, SS head Heinrich Himmler travelled to Norway to oversee preparations. Quisling clearly believed that if Norway supported Nazi Germany on the battlefield, there would be no reason for Germany to annex it. To this end, he opposed plans to have a German SS brigade loyal only to Hitler installed in Norway. In the process, he also toughened his attitude to the country harbouring the exiled king, the United Kingdom, which he no longer saw as a Nordic ally. Finally, Quisling aligned Norwegian policy on Jews with that of Germany, giving a speech in Frankfurt on 26 March 1941 in which he argued for compulsory exile, but warned against extermination: "And since the Jewish question cannot be solved by simply exterminating the Jews or sterilizing them, secondly their parasitic existence must be prevented by giving them, like the other peoples of the earth, their own land. However, their former land, Palestine, has been the land of the Arabs for centuries. There is therefore no better and milder way to solve the Jewish problem than to get them another so-called promised land and to send them all there together, so as to, if possible, bring the eternal Jew and his divided soul to rest."

In May, Quisling was shattered by the death of his mother Anna, as the two had been particularly close. At the same time, the political crisis over Norwegian independence deepened, with Quisling threatening Terboven with his resignation over the issue of finance. In the end, the Reichskommissar agreed to compromise on the issue, but Quisling had to concede on the SS issue: a brigade was formed, but as a branch of the Nasjonal Samling.

Meanwhile, the government line hardened, with Communist Party leaders arrested and trade unionists intimidated. On 10 September 1941, Viggo Hansteen and Rolf Wickstrøm were executed and many more imprisoned following the milk strike in Oslo. Hansteen's execution was later seen as a watershed moment, starting the deadly phase of the occupation. The same year Statspolitiet ("the State Police"), abolished in 1937, was re-established to assist the Gestapo in Norway, and radio sets were confiscated across the country. Though these were all Terboven's decisions, Quisling agreed with them and went on to denounce the government-in-exile as "traitors." In response to the toughened stance, Norwegian society formed an informal "ice front", ostracising Nasjonal Samling supporters. Quisling remained convinced this was an anti-German sentiment that would fade away once Berlin had handed power over to Nasjonal Samling. However, the only concessions he won in 1941 were having the heads of ministries promoted to official ministers of the government, and independence for the party secretariat.

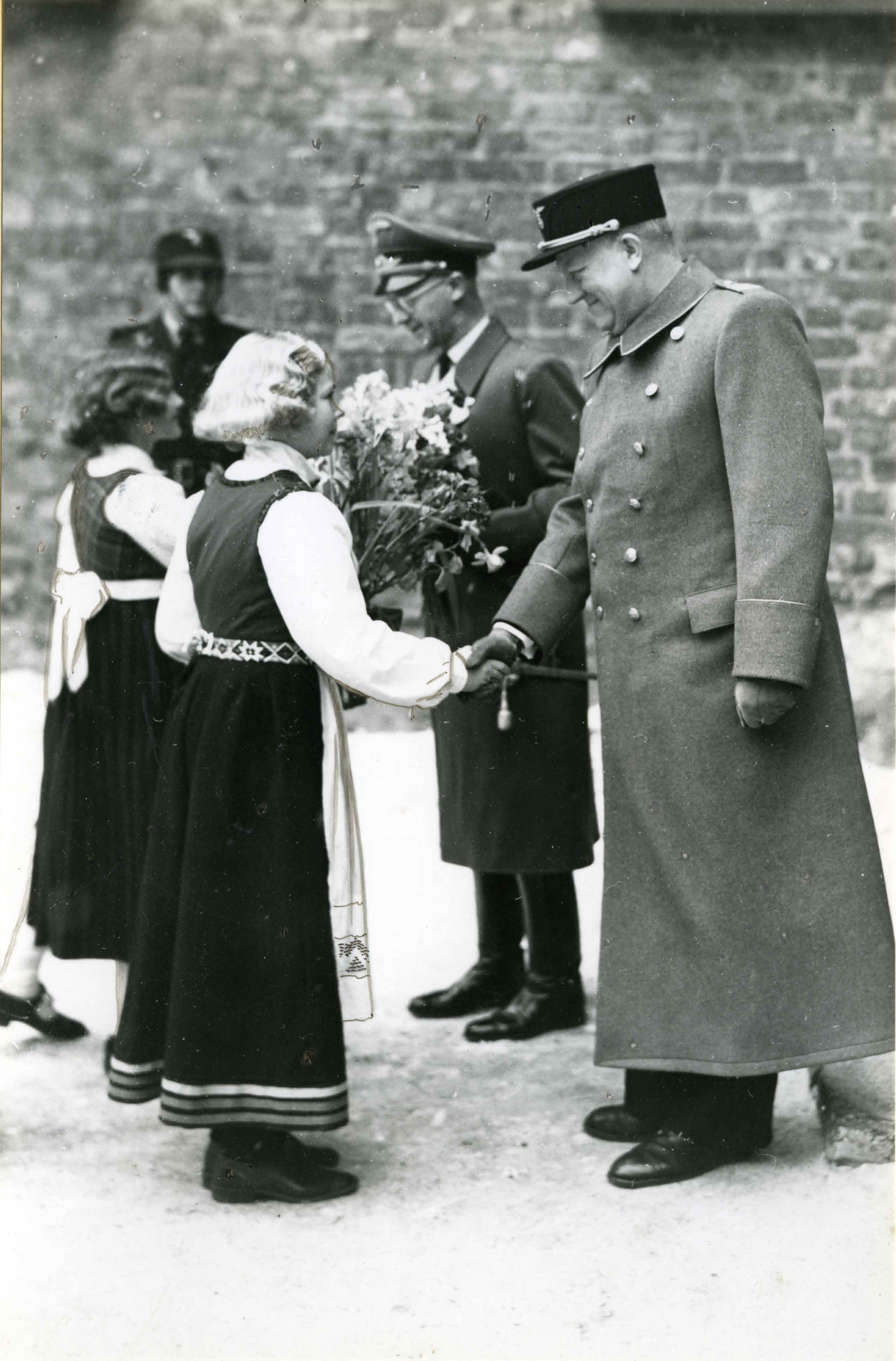
Two girls in Bunad greet Reichskommissar Josef Terboven and Minister President Vidkun Quisling on 1 February 1942.

In January 1942, Terboven announced that the German administration would be wound down. Soon afterwards he told Quisling that Hitler had approved the transfer of power, scheduled for 30 January. Quisling remained doubtful it would happen, since Germany and Norway were in the midst of complex peace negotiations that could not be completed until peace had been reached on the Eastern Front, and Terboven insisted that the Reichskommissariat would remain in power until such peace came about. Quisling could nevertheless be reasonably confident that his position within the party and with Berlin was unassailable, even if he was unpopular within Norway, of which he was well aware.

After a brief postponement, an announcement was made on 1 February 1942 that the cabinet had elected Quisling to the post of minister president of the national government. The appointment was accompanied by a banquet, rallies, and other celebrations by the Nasjonal Samling members. In his first speech, Quisling committed the government to closer ties with Germany. The only change to the Constitution was the reinstatement of the ban on Jewish entry into Norway, which had been abolished in 1851.

=== Minister President ===
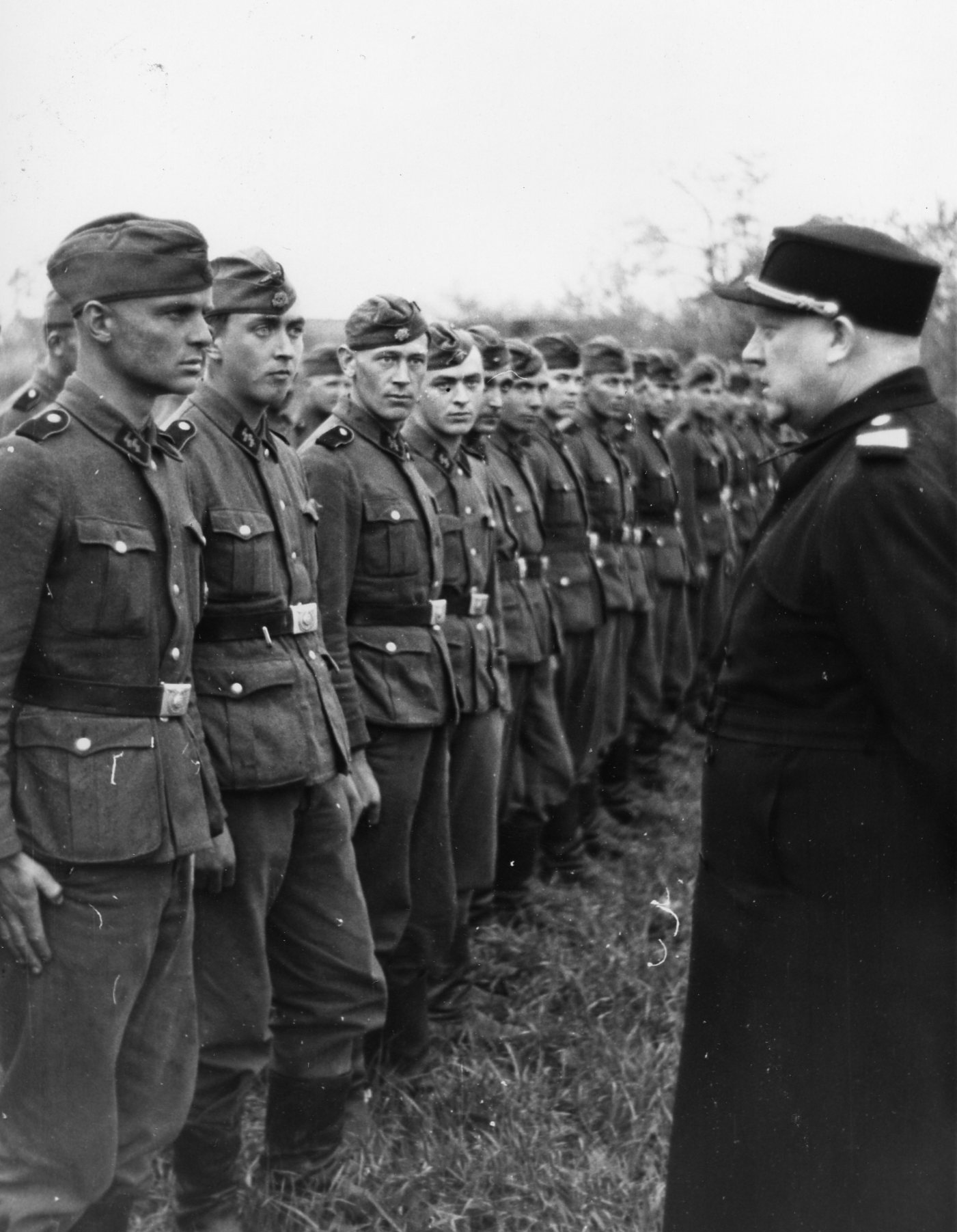
Quisling with Norwegian volunteers on the eastern front in 1942

His new position gave Quisling a security of tenure he had not previously enjoyed, although the Reichskommissariat remained outside his control. A month later, in February 1942, Quisling made his first state visit to Berlin. It was a productive trip, in which all key issues of Norwegian independence were discussed—but Joseph Goebbels in particular remained unconvinced of Quisling's credentials, noting that it was "unlikely" he would "...ever make a great statesman."

Back at home, Quisling was now less concerned about Nasjonal Samling's membership, and even wanted action to clean up the membership list, including purging it of drunkards. On 12 March 1942, Norway officially became a one-party state. In time, criticism of, and resistance to, the party was criminalised, though Quisling expressed regret for having to take this step, hoping that every Norwegian would freely come around to accepting his government.

This optimism was short-lived. In the course of the summer of 1942, Quisling lost any ability he might have had to sway public opinion by attempting to force children into the Nasjonal Samlings Ungdomsfylking youth organisation, which was modelled on the Hitler Youth. This move prompted a mass resignation of teachers from their professional body and churchmen from their posts, along with large-scale civil unrest. His attempted indictment of Bishop Eivind Berggrav proved similarly controversial, even amongst his German allies. Quisling now toughened his stance, telling Norwegians that they would have the new regime forced upon them "whether they like it or not." On 1 May 1942, the German High Command noted that "organised resistance to Quisling has started" and Norway's peace talks with Germany stalled as a result. On 11 August 1942, Hitler postponed any further peace negotiations until the war ended. Quisling was admonished and learned that Norway would not get the independence he so greatly yearned for. As an added insult, for the first time he was forbidden to write letters directly to Hitler.

Quisling had earlier pushed for a corporate alternative to the Parliament of Norway, the Storting, which he called a Riksting. It would comprise two chambers, the Næringsting (Economic Chamber) and Kulturting (Cultural Chamber). Now, in advance of Nasjonal Samling's eighth and last national convention on 25 September 1942, and becoming increasingly distrustful of professional bodies, he changed his mind. The Riksting became an advisory body while the Førerting (Leader Council), and parliamentary chambers were now to be separate bodies subordinate to their respective ministries. (Note: Only the Cultural Chamber actually came into being, while the Economic Chamber was postponed because of unrest within the professional bodies it was supposed to represent.)

After the convention, support for Nasjonal Samling, and Quisling personally, ebbed away. Increased factionalism and personal losses, including the accidental death of fellow politician Gulbrand Lunde, were compounded by heavy-handed German tactics, such as the shooting of ten well-known residents of Trøndelag and its environs in October 1942. In addition, the lex Eilifsen ex-post facto law of August 1943, which led to the first death sentence passed by the regime, was widely seen as a blatant violation of the Constitution and a sign of Norway's increasing role in the anti-Jewish Final Solution, and would destroy everything the convention had achieved in terms of boosting party morale.

With the active cooperation of the collaborationist authorities and Quisling's personal involvement, Jews in Norway were registered following a German initiative in January 1942. On 26 October 1942 German forces, assisted by the Norwegian police and members of Hirden, the paramilitary wing of Nasjonal Samling, arrested about 300 registered Jewish men and interned them in concentration camps, most of them at Berg. On the same day the state confiscated Jewish property under a law passed by Quisling's government. (Note: Property confiscations were enabled by a law of 26 October 1942. Quisling's motivations in passing such a law have proved controversial, alternately labelled as collaborationist and an actively anti-collaborationist attempt to stop the occupiers from confiscating Jewish property.)

On 26 November the detainees and their families were deported. The transports were organised by the German occupation authorities, who relied on Norwegian police and administrative assistance, and formed part of the wider deportation of Norwegian Jews to camps in Nazi-German occupied Poland. Dahl writes that Quisling may not have been informed in advance of the exact timing of the first transport, but notes that he afterwards presented the deportations to the Norwegian public as his own initiative in order to signal loyalty to Germany. A further 250 Jews were deported in February 1943, and the party leadership left no clear statement of its view of the deportees' ultimate fate. Dahl has suggested that Quisling may have accepted at face value the official German line in 1943 and 1944 that the deportees were being held for later resettlement in a planned Jewish territory, sometimes associated with the Madagascar Plan. In reality, their destination was the extermination camp at Auschwitz. That Quisling understood the realities of the final solution is suggested by authors such as Høidal, but this has never been proven.

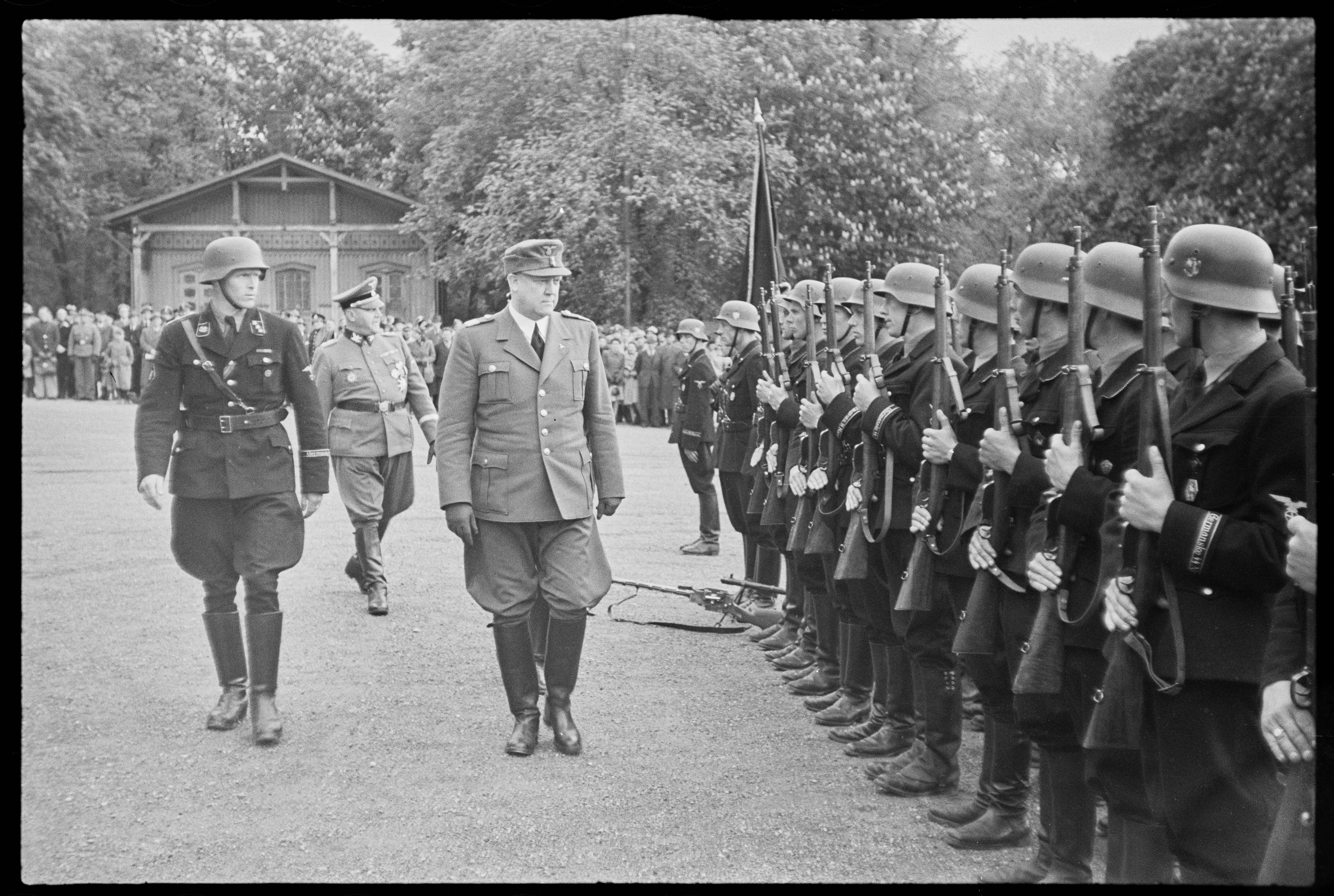
Vidkun Quisling inspects Norwegian volunteers in the Germanic SS Norway (Germanske SS Norge) at Slottsplassen in Oslo, 1944

At the same time, Quisling believed that the only way he could regain Hitler's respect was to raise more Norwegian volunteers for the now-faltering German war effort, and he publicly committed Norway to German plans for total war. For him at least, after the German defeat at Stalingrad in February 1943, Norway still had a part to play in keeping the German empire strong. In April 1943, Quisling delivered a scathing speech attacking Germany's refusal to outline its plans for post-war Europe. When he put these complaints to Hitler in person, the Nazi leader remained unmoved despite Norway's contributions to the war effort. Quisling felt betrayed over this postponement of Norwegian freedom, an attitude that waned only when Hitler eventually committed to a free post-war Norway in September 1943.

Biographers describe Quisling as increasingly fatigued during the final years of the war. In 1942 he passed 231 laws, 166 in 1943, and 139 in 1944, with social policy remaining one of the areas that still received significant attention. By that autumn, Quisling and Anton Mussert in the Netherlands could be satisfied they had at least survived in office. In 1944, the weight problems Quisling had been having during the preceding two years also eased.

Despite the increasingly dire military outlook in 1943 and 1944, Nasjonal Samling's position at the head of the collaborationist government, albeit with its ambiguous relationship to the Reichskommissariat, remained formally unchallenged. At the same time the Germans exerted increasing control over law and its enforcement in Norway. Following the deportation of the Jews, Germany deported Norwegian officers, and finally attempted to deport students from the University of Oslo; even Hitler was incensed by the scale of the arrests. Quisling became entangled in a similar debacle in early 1944 when he forced compulsory military service on elements of the Hirden, causing a number of members to resign to avoid being drafted.

On 20 January 1945, Quisling made what would be his final trip to visit Hitler. According to Dahl, Quisling proposed that Norway should continue to support Germany in the last phase of the war in return for greater political autonomy and an end to direct German interference in Norwegian affairs, reflecting his fear that the occupation government would struggle to retain control as German forces retreated southwards through Norway. Hitler instead confirmed a scorched earth policy in northern Norway, including forced evacuations during which Norwegian civilians who refused to leave could be shot. Dahl relates that Quisling refused to sign a German demand for the execution of thousands of alleged Norwegian "saboteurs", enraging Reichskommissar Josef Terboven, who stormed out of the meeting. In later accounts of the visit Quisling reportedly broke down in tears when describing it to a friend, convinced that the failure to secure a political settlement would fix his reputation in Norway as that of a traitor.

In the final months of the war Quisling increasingly presented himself, both to associates and later at his trial, as seeking to limit further Norwegian casualties as defeat approached. His government participated in efforts to secure the repatriation of Norwegians held in German prisoner-of-war camps, and by this stage he appears to have accepted that National Socialism would be defeated. After Hitler's suicide on 30 April 1945 Quisling publicly advanced what Dahl characterises as a naïve proposal for a transitional, power-sharing government involving both his administration and the government-in-exile, which found no support.

On 7 May, Quisling ordered the Norwegian police not to offer armed resistance to Allied forces except in self-defence, or against clearly identified members of the Norwegian resistance movement. The same day, Germany announced it would surrender unconditionally, making Quisling's position untenable. On the following day he met military leaders of the resistance to discuss the terms of his arrest. According to Dahl, Quisling stated that he did not wish to be treated as a common criminal but also that he did not want preferential treatment compared to his Nasjonal Samling colleagues. He claimed that he could have ordered his forces to continue fighting but had chosen not to, saying he wished to avoid turning "Norway into a battlefield", and he presented his actions as helping to secure an orderly transfer of power. In the agreement reached at the meeting the resistance leadership undertook that collaborationists would stand trial before Norwegian courts after the war, and Quisling was initially confined in a house rather than a prison.

== Arrest ==
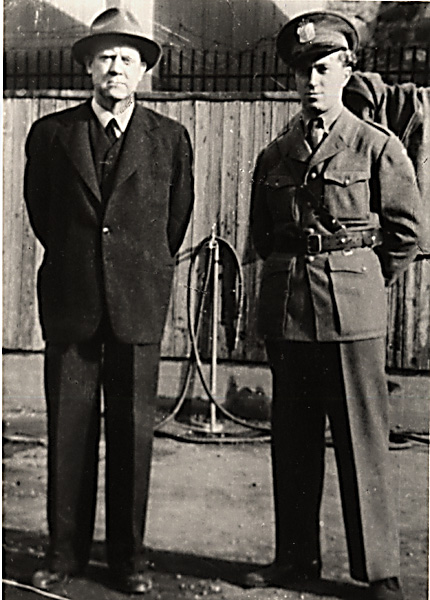
Vidkun Quisling in custody at Akershus fortress, 1945.

The civil leadership of the resistance, represented by lawyer Sven Arntzen, demanded Quisling be treated like any other murder suspect and, on 9 May 1945, Quisling and his ministers turned themselves in to police. Quisling was transferred to Cell 12 in Møllergata 19, the main Oslo police station. The cell had a tiny table, a basin, and a hole in the wall for a toilet bucket.

After ten weeks of being constantly watched to prevent suicide attempts in police custody, he was transferred to Akershus Fortress and awaited trial as part of the legal purge. He soon started working on his case with Henrik Bergh, a lawyer with a good track record but largely unsympathetic, at least initially, to Quisling's plight. Bergh did, however, believe Quisling's testimony that he tried to act in the best interests of Norway and decided to use this as a starting point for the defence.

Initially, Quisling's charges related to the coup, including his revocation of the mobilisation order, to his time as Nasjonal Samling leader and to his actions as minister president, such as assisting the enemy and illegally attempting to alter the constitution. Finally, he was accused of Gunnar Eilifsen's murder. While not contesting the key facts, he denied all charges on the grounds that he had always worked for a free and prosperous Norway, and submitted a sixty-page response. On 11 July 1945, a further indictment was brought, adding a raft of new charges, including more murders, theft, embezzlement, and, most worrying of all for Quisling, the charge of conspiring with Hitler over the invasion and occupation of Norway.

== Trial and execution ==
I know that the Norwegian people have sentenced me to death, and that the easiest course for me would be to take my own life. But I want to let history reach its own verdict. Believe me, in ten years' time I will have become another Saint Olav.

— Quisling to Bjørn Foss, 8 May 1945, Dahl 1999, p. 367

The trial opened on 20 August 1945. Quisling's defence rested on downplaying his unity with Germany and stressing that he had fought for total independence, something that seemed completely contrary to the recollections of many Norwegians. From that point on, wrote biographer Dahl, Quisling had to tread a "fine line between truth and falsehood", and emerged from it "an elusive and often pitiful figure". He misrepresented the truth on several occasions, and his truthful statements won him few advocates in the country at large, where he remained almost universally despised.

In the later days of the trial, Quisling's health suffered, largely due to the number of medical tests to which he was subjected, and his defence faltered. The prosecution's final speech placed responsibility for the Final Solution—the murder of Jews—being carried out in Norway on Quisling, using the testimony of German officials. Prosecutor Annæus Schjødt called for the death penalty, using laws introduced by the government-in-exile in October 1941 and January 1942.

Speeches by both Bergh and Quisling himself did not change the outcome. On 10 September 1945 Quisling was convicted on all but a handful of minor charges, and sentenced to death.

An October appeal to the Supreme Court was rejected. The court process was judged to be "a model of fairness" in a commentary by author Maynard Cohen. After giving testimony in a number of other trials of Nasjonal Samling members, Quisling was executed by firing squad at Akershus Fortress at 02:40 on 24 October 1945. His last words before being shot were, "I'm convicted unfairly and I die innocent." After his death his body was cremated and the ashes interred in Fyresdal. In 1959, his ashes were transferred to his family grave at Gjerpen Church, with approval by the third Gerhardsen cabinet. The grave did not state his name until 1982.

== Legacy ==
Quisling died believing that he would be swiftly vindicated, but 80 years after he fell from power, his legacy is overwhelmingly that of a man who betrayed his country for personal and political gain.

The Nasjonal Samling movement was wiped out as a political force in Norway after 1945, and Quisling has become one of the most written-about Norwegians of all time.

Quisling's collaboration with Nazi Germany led to his surname becoming synonymous with treason before World War II was even over. The word quisling, which had been coined by the British newspaper The Times in its lead of 15 April 1940, titled "Quislings everywhere", became a synonym for traitor. The noun survived, and for a while during and after World War II, the back-formed verb to quisle /ˈkwɪzəl/ was used. One who was quisling was in the act of committing treason.

Quisling's wife Maria lived in Oslo until her death in 1980. They had no children. Upon her death, she donated all their Russian antiques to a charitable fund. She was interred at the Quisling family grave in a small ceremony. Her will stipulated that the grave's ground rent be paid through a donation to the Church City Mission for fifty years. The Church City Mission decided to stop paying the rent after forty-five years, in 2025, citing the grave's status as a gathering point for Nazi sympathisers.

For most of his later political career, Quisling lived in a mansion on Bygdøy in Oslo that he called "Gimle," after the place in Norse mythology where survivors of the great battle of Ragnarök were to live. The house, later renamed Villa Grande, in time became a Holocaust museum.

== Personality ==
To his supporters, Quisling was regarded as a conscientious administrator of the highest order, knowledgeable and with an eye for detail. He was believed to care deeply about his people and to maintain high moral standards throughout. To his opponents, Quisling was unstable and undisciplined, abrupt, even threatening. Quite possibly he was both, at ease among friends and under pressure when confronted with his political opponents, and generally shy and retiring with both. During formal dinners he often said nothing at all except for the occasional cascade of dramatic rhetoric. Indeed, he did not react well to pressure and would often let slip over-dramatic sentiments when put on the spot. Normally open to criticism, he was prone to assuming larger groups were conspiratorial.

Post-war interpretations of Quisling's character are similarly mixed. After the war, collaborationist behaviour was popularly viewed as a result of mental deficiency, leaving the personality of the clearly more intelligent Quisling an "enigma". He was instead seen as weak, paranoid, intellectually sterile, and power-hungry: ultimately "muddled rather than thoroughly corrupted". Dahl quoted psychiatrist Gabriel Langfeldt as saying that Quisling's ultimate philosophical goals "fitted the classic description of the paranoid megalomaniac more exactly than any other case [he had] ever encountered."

During his time in office, Quisling rose early, often having completed several hours of work before arriving at the office between 9:30 and 10:00. He liked to intervene in virtually all government matters, reading all letters addressed to him or his chancellery personally and marking a surprising number for action. Quisling was independent-minded, made several key decisions on the spot, and unlike his German counterpart, he liked to follow procedure to ensure that government remained "a dignified and civilised" affair throughout. He took a personal interest in the administration of Fyresdal, where he was born.

He rejected German racial supremacy and instead saw the Norwegian race as the progenitor of Northern Europe, tracing his own family tree in his spare time. Party members did not receive preferential treatment, though Quisling did not himself share in the wartime hardships of his fellow Norwegians. Nevertheless, many gifts went unused and he did not live extravagantly.

== Religious and philosophical views ==
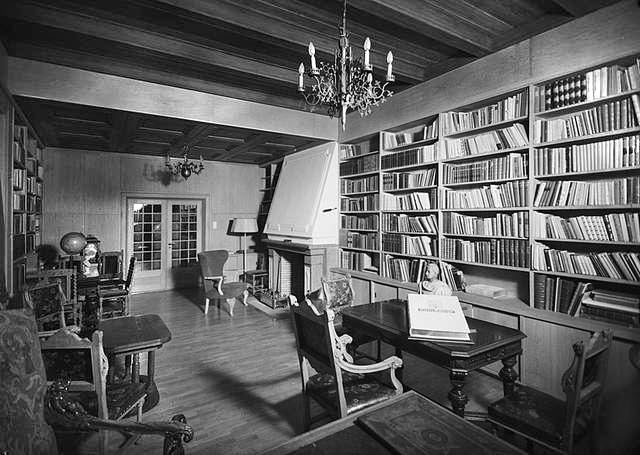
Quisling's library included works of eminent philosophers

Quisling was interested in science, eastern religions and metaphysics, eventually building up a library that included the works of Spinoza, Kant, Hegel, and Schopenhauer. He kept up with developments in the realm of quantum physics, but did not keep up with more current philosophical ideas. He blended philosophy and science into what he called "Universism" (or "Universalism"), which was a unified explanation of everything. His original writings stretched to a claimed two thousand pages. He rejected the basic teachings of orthodox Christianity, and established Universism into a new theory of life; a term borrowed from a textbook which Jan Jakob Maria de Groot had written on Chinese philosophy. De Groot's book argued that Taoism, Confucianism, and Buddhism were all part of a world religion that De Groot called Universism. Quisling described how his philosophy "followed from the universal theory of relativity, of which the specific and general theories of relativity are special instances." Quisling wanted universism to be the official state religion of Norway.

His magnum opus was divided into four parts: an introduction, a description of mankind's apparent progression from individual to increasing complex consciousnesses, a section on his tenets of morality and law, and a final section on science, art, politics, history, race and religion. The conclusion was to be titled The World's Organic Classification and Organisation, but the work remained unfinished. Generally, Quisling worked on it infrequently during his time in politics. The biographer Hans Fredrik Dahl describes this as "fortunate", since Quisling would "never have won recognition" as a philosopher.

During his trial, and particularly after being sentenced, Quisling became interested once more in Universism. He saw the events of the war as part of the move towards the establishment of God's kingdom on earth and justified his actions in those terms. During the first week of October, he wrote a fifty-page document titled Universistic Aphorisms, which represented "an almost ecstatic revelation of truth and the light to come, which bore the mark of nothing less than a prophet." The document was also notable for its attack on the materialism of Nazism. In addition, he simultaneously worked on a sermon, Eternal Justice, which reiterated his key beliefs, including reincarnation.

== In popular culture ==
Quisling was portrayed by Gard B. Eidsvold in the 2024 Norwegian film Quisling: The Final Days which dramatises the arrest, trial, and execution of the Nazi collaborator. The film was well received by critics.

== Works ==
- Quisling, Vidkun (1931). Russia and Ourselves. London: Hodder and Stoughton. LCCN 32013989.

=== In Norwegian ===
- Quisling, Vidkun (1930). Russland og vi [Russia and Ourselves]. Oslo: Jacob Dybwads Forlag. LCCN ltf90029241.

==== Articles and speeches ====
- Quisling, Vidkun (1940). Quisling har sagt – I. Citater fra taler og avisartikler [Quisling has said – I. Quotations from speeches and newspaper articles]. Oslo: J. M. Stenersens forlag. LCCN 41013470.
- Quisling, Vidkun (1941). Quisling har sagt – II. Ti års kamp mot katastrofepolitikken [Quisling has said – II. Ten years of struggle against disaster politics]. Gunnar Stenersens forlag. LCCN 41013470.
- Quisling, Vidkun (1941). Quisling har sagt – III. For Norges frihet og selvstendighet. Artikler og taler 9. april 1940 – 23. juni 1941 [Quisling has said – III. For the freedom and independence of Norway. Articles and speeches 9 April 1940 – 23 June 1941]. Oslo: Gunnar Stenersens forlag. LCCN 67136013.
- Quisling, Vidkun (1943). Quisling har sagt – IV. Mot nytt land. Artikler og taler av Vidkun Quisling 1941–1943 [Quisling has said – IV. Towards a new country. Articles and speeches by Vidkun Quisling 1941–1943]. Blix forlag.
- Jensen, Tom B. (1996). Bibliografi av og om Vidkun Quisling [Bibliography of and about Vidkun Quisling]. Oslo: Grafisk media forl.

== See also ==
- Førergarde, Quisling's personal guard
- Others whose names became terms meaning "traitor":
  - Philippe Pétain, French Marshal
  - Andrey Vlasov, Soviet general
  - Mir Jafar, ruler of Bengal
  - Robert Lundy, Scottish army officer
  - Wang Jingwei, Chinese politician
  - Benedict Arnold, US officer
  - Joaquim Silvério dos Reis, Brazilian officer and landowner
  - Judas, Apostle

== Footnotes ==
Political offices
Preceded by Torgeir Anderssen-Rysst	Minister of Defence of Norway; 1931–1933	Succeeded by Jens Isak de Lange Kobro
New title	Minister President of Norway; 1942–1945	Office abolished
