= Henrik Bergh =

Norwegian lawyer and politician

- Born: 24 April 1879; Kristiania, Norway
- Died: 12 July 1952 (aged 73)
- Occupation(s): Lawyer and politician

Henrik Arnold Thaulow Bergh (24 April 1879 – 12 July 1952) was a Norwegian lawyer and politician, born in Oslo, a barrister at the Supreme Court of Norway. He is known for his defence of Vidkun Quisling during the trial for treason in 1945.
