= Edvard Poulsson =

Norwegian physician (1858–1935)

- Born: 18 April 1858; Larvik
- Died: 19 March 1935 (aged 76)
- Occupation: Physician
- Children: Erik T. Poulsson
- Relatives: Gabriel Langfeldt (son-in-law)

Poul Edvard Poulsson (18 April 1858 – 19 March 1935) was a Norwegian physician and pharmacologist. He was a professor and founder of the department of pharmacology at the University of Oslo.

== Biography ==
Poulsson was born in Larvik in 1858 and married Anna Sophie Tutein in 1896. He was the father of lawyer Erik Tutein Poulsson and a father-in-law of Gabriel Langfeldt. He became a cand.med. in 1885 and studied medicine at Oslo's Rikshospitalet. He traveled to Germany in 1887 to study pharmacology and physiology, and in 1890 he worked alongside Oswald Schmiedeberg to describe the paralytic effects of cocaine and strychnine in animals. His doctoral thesis, which he defended in 1892, focused on anthelmintic drugs.

Poulsson returned to Oslo in 1891 and worked as a consultant at Sandefjord Spa until 1897. He was appointed extraordinary professor at the University of Oslo from 1895 (and ordinary professor from 1913); he founded the university's department of pharmacology. After his retirement as professor in 1928, he was appointed manager of the recently established Statens Vitaminlaboratorium. Among his works are Om strykninets lammende virkning from 1889, Lærebog i farmakologi for læger og studerende from 1905, and Om det fettopløselige vitamin og torskelevertran from 1923. His research in the 1920s focused on vitamins, particularly vitamin D; he showed that Norwegian cod liver oil contained more vitamin D than foreign forms of cod liver oil. He was a fellow of the Norwegian Academy of Science and Letters from 1894.

Poulsson died on 19 March 1935 in Aker (now Oslo).
