= Alexandra Voronin =

First wife of Vidkun Quisling

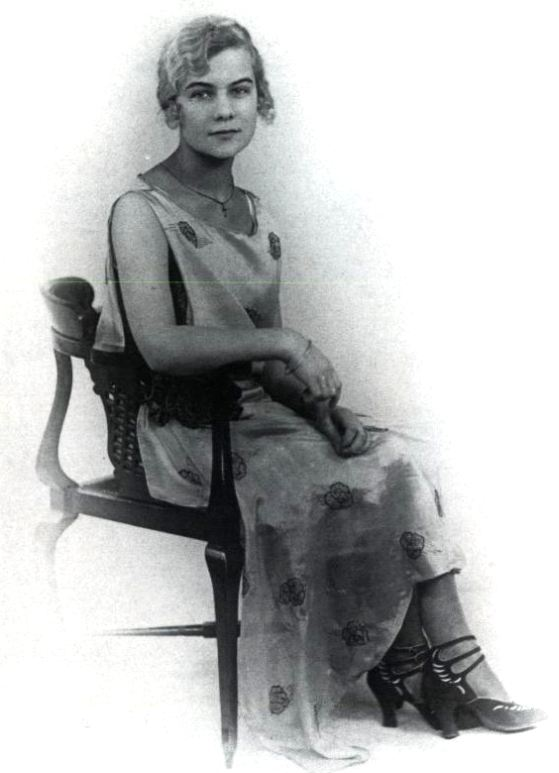
- Born: 20 August 1905; Sevastopol, Russian Empire
- Died: 1 October 1993 (aged 88); Santa Clara, California, United States
- Known for: First wife of Norwegian fascist politician Vidkun Quisling
- Spouses: Vidkun Quisling (m. 1922; ann. 1933) Dr. J. P. Ryabin (m. 1933; died 1936) W. George Yourief (1947–1993)

Alexandra Andreyevna Voronin (née Voronina, later Yourieff; Russian: Александра Андреевна Воронина, 20 August 1905 — 1 October 1993) was the Russian wife of Norwegian fascist Vidkun Quisling, the leader of Nasjonal Samling (NS), the political party which collaborated with the German occupational force in Norway during World War II.

== Early life ==
Alexandra was born in Sevastopol into an upper-class family, the daughter of physician Andrei Sergeyevich Voronin. The third of five children, she was the only one to survive infancy. Her mother was Irina Theodorovna von Kotzebue, a descendant of a viceroy of Poland and of the 9th century Varangian chieftain Rurik.

When Alexandra was about three years old, the family moved to Yalta and moved again to Kharkiv after the First World War began in 1914. There, she attended the Kharkiv Ballet School and was sent to the LV Dombrovskaya women's gymnasium, at that time a prestigious boarding school for the children of the nobility. Her father disappeared without trace during the middle years of the First World War, and her mother became a paid hospital nurse, having previously been a volunteer. After the 1917 Russian Revolution, the family's lifestyle collapsed, as servants fled and rooms in their apartment were confiscated. They returned to Crimea for a time, where her mother considered emigrating to France or Romania.

Alexandra married Quisling in August 1922, the day after her 17th birthday, at a Registry office in Kharkiv, and then travelled to Moscow for the issuing of documents at the Norwegian legation, including her name being added to Quisling’s passport. In March 1923, Alexandra was pregnant, and Quisling insisted on her having an abortion, which greatly distressed her. They made a short trip to Norway, then returned to Kharkiv, where Quisling may have married Maria Pasetshnikova without divorcing Alexandra. In the summer of 1924, the three returned together to Norway, where Vidkun Quisling began to refer to Alexandra as his "foster daughter", instead of his wife, as before. Alexandra Voronin subsequently left Norway to live with an aunt in Nice and never returned.

== Later life ==
In 1929, Quisling broke off all contact with Voronin, and she migrated to China. There, in 1933, the Russian Orthodox Archbishop of China annulled her marriage to Quisling, so that she could marry Dr. J. P. Ryabin. They had one son. Her second husband died in an accident in 1936, and the same year she met and married W. George Yourieff, a Russian architect and honorary French consul in Qingdao, whom she had known since her youth. In 1947, they migrated together to the United States and settled in Palo Alto, California. Eventually they wrote a book about Voronin’s life with Vidkun Quisling. W. George Yourieff died in July 1999, aged 94.
