= Langfeld =

Langfeld is a surname. Notable people with the surname include:

- Herbert Langfeld (1879–1958), American psychologist
- Josh Langfeld (born 1977), American ice hockey player
- Julius Langfeld (born 1995), German footballer

== See also ==
- Langfeldt
- Langfield
