= Gunnar Eilifsen =

Norwegian police officer (1897–1943)

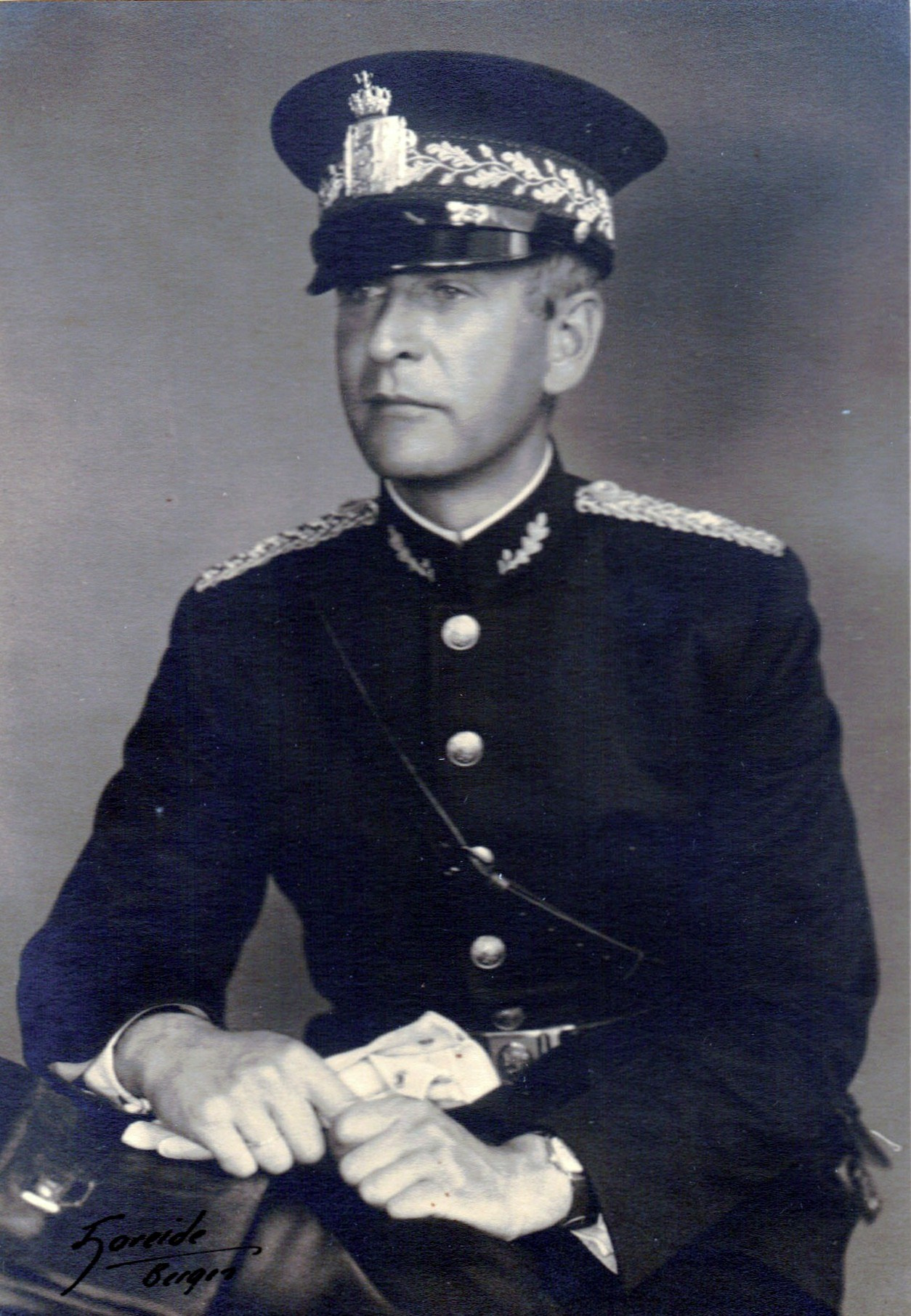
Gunnar Eilifsen

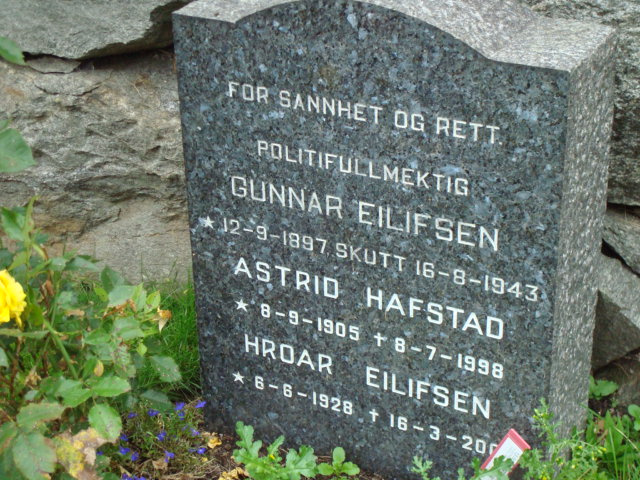
Gunnar Eilifsens headstone- Nordstrand graveyard

Gunnar Eilifsen (12 September 1897 – 16 August 1943) was a Norwegian police officer.

In 1943, during the Nazi occupation of Norway, he was executed for disobedience when he refused to arrest five girls who did not show up for forced labour. As the military code (which allowed execution for insubordination) did not previously apply to police officers, a retroactive law was hurriedly passed after his execution, and that law was subsequently referred to as Lex Eilifsen. Vidkun Quisling was convicted for his murder.
