= Einar Langfeldt =

Norwegian physiologist (1884–1966)

- Born: 1 December 1884; Kristiansand
- Died: 19 September 1966 (aged 81)
- Occupation: Physician
- Relatives: Gabriel Langfeldt (brother)

Einar Langfeldt (1 December 1884 – 19 September 1966) was a Norwegian physician. He was born in Kristiansand, and was a brother of Gabriel Langfeldt. He was appointed professor at the University of Oslo from 1925. Among his works is his thesis The partial pancreatectomy, and Lærebok i fysiologisk og medisinsk kjemi from 1928.
