= Rinnan (disambiguation) =

Rinnan may refer to:

== Places ==
- Rinnan, a village in Levanger Municipality in Trøndelag county, Norway
- Rinnan Station, a railway station in Levanger Municipality in Trøndelag county, Norway

== People ==
- Rinnan (surname), a list of people with the surname Rinnan
- Rinnan gang, an independent group under the German Sicherheitsdienst in Trondheim, Norway
- Rinnan, another spelling for Rinnal, a mythological Irish king
