= German occupation of Norway =

Part of World War II

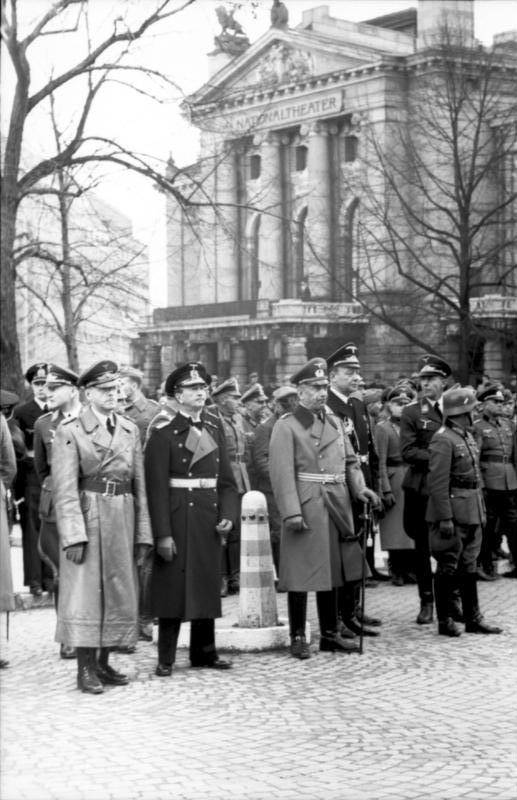
German officers in front of the National Theatre in Oslo, 1940

The occupation of Norway by Nazi Germany during the Second World War began on 9 April 1940 after Operation Weserübung. Conventional armed resistance to the German invasion ended on 10 June 1940, and Nazi Germany controlled Norway until the capitulation of German forces in Europe on 8 May 1945. Throughout this period, a pro-German government named Den nasjonale regjering ('the National Government') ruled Norway, while the Norwegian king Haakon VII and the prewar government escaped to London, where they formed a government in exile. Civil rule was effectively assumed by the Reichskommissariat Norwegen (Reich Commissariat of Norway), which acted in collaboration with the pro-German puppet government. This period of military occupation is, in Norway, referred to as the "war years", "occupation period" or simply "the war".

== Background ==
Having maintained its neutrality during the First World War (1914–1918), Norwegian foreign and military policy since 1933 was largely influenced by three factors:

- Fiscal austerity promoted by fiscally conservative parties;
- Pacifism promoted by the Norwegian Labour Party;
- A doctrine of neutrality, on the assumption that there would be no need to bring Norway into a war if it remained neutral.

These three factors encountered resistance as tensions escalated in Europe during the 1930s, initially from Norwegian military personnel and right-wing political groups, but increasingly also from individuals within the mainstream political establishment, and, as it has since come to light, from the monarch, King Haakon VII, who was involved behind the scenes. By the late 1930s, the Norwegian parliament (the Storting) had accepted the need for a strengthened military and expanded the budget accordingly, even by assuming national debt. As it turned out, most of the plans enabled by the budgetary expansion were not completed in time.

=== Pre-war relations with Britain ===
Although neutrality remained the highest priority, it was known throughout the government that Norway, above all, did not want to be at war with Britain. On 28 April 1939, Nazi Germany offered Norway and several other Nordic countries non-aggression pacts. To maintain its neutrality, Norway turned down the German offer, as did Sweden and Finland. By the autumn of 1939, there was an increasing sense of urgency because of its long western coastline facing access routes into the North Sea and the North Atlantic Ocean, as Norway had to prepare, not only to protect its neutrality, but indeed to fight for its freedom and independence. Efforts to improve military readiness and capability and to sustain an extended blockade were intensified between September 1939 and April 1940. Several incidents in Norwegian maritime waters, notably the Altmark incident in the Jøssingfjorden (near the village of Jøssingfjord), put great strains on Norway's ability to assert its neutrality. Norway managed to negotiate favorable trade treaties both with the United Kingdom and Germany under these conditions, but it became increasingly clear that both countries had a strategic interest in denying the other warring power access to Norway and its coastline.

The government was also increasingly pressured by Britain to direct ever larger parts of its massive merchant fleet to transport British goods at low rates as well as to join the trade blockade against Germany. In March and April 1940, British plans for an invasion of Norway were prepared, mainly in order to reach and disable the Swedish iron ore mines in Gällivare. It was hoped that this would divert German forces away from France and open a war front in south Sweden.

The plan involved the placement of naval mines in Norwegian waters (Operation Wilfred) and was to be followed by the landing of troops at four Norwegian ports: Narvik, Trondheim, Bergen and Stavanger. It was hoped that the mining would trigger German agitation, thereby necessitating an immediate response from the Allies. However, because of Anglo-French arguments, the date of the mining was postponed from 5 April to 8 April. However, on 1 April Adolf Hitler ordered the German invasion of Norway to begin on 9 April; on 8 April, while the Norwegian government was preoccupied with earnest protest about the Allied mine-laying, the German expeditions were already mobilizing.

== German invasion ==
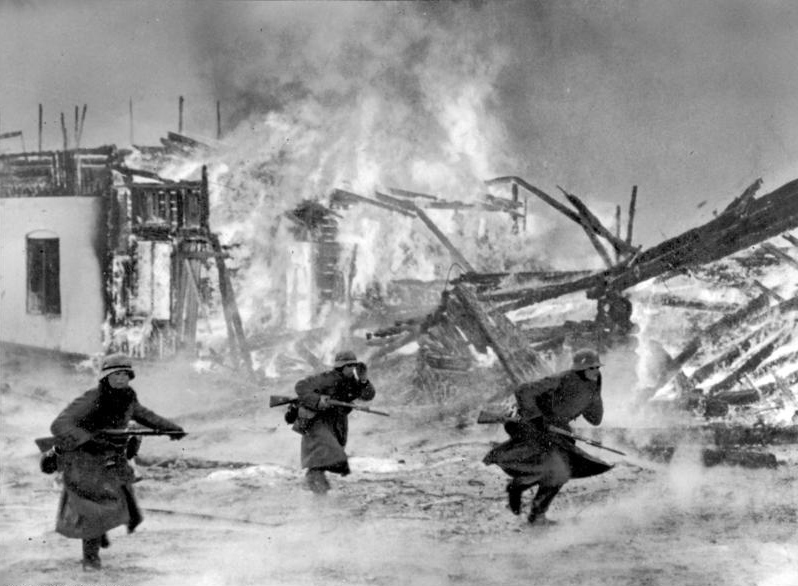
German infantry attacking through a burning Norwegian village, April 1940

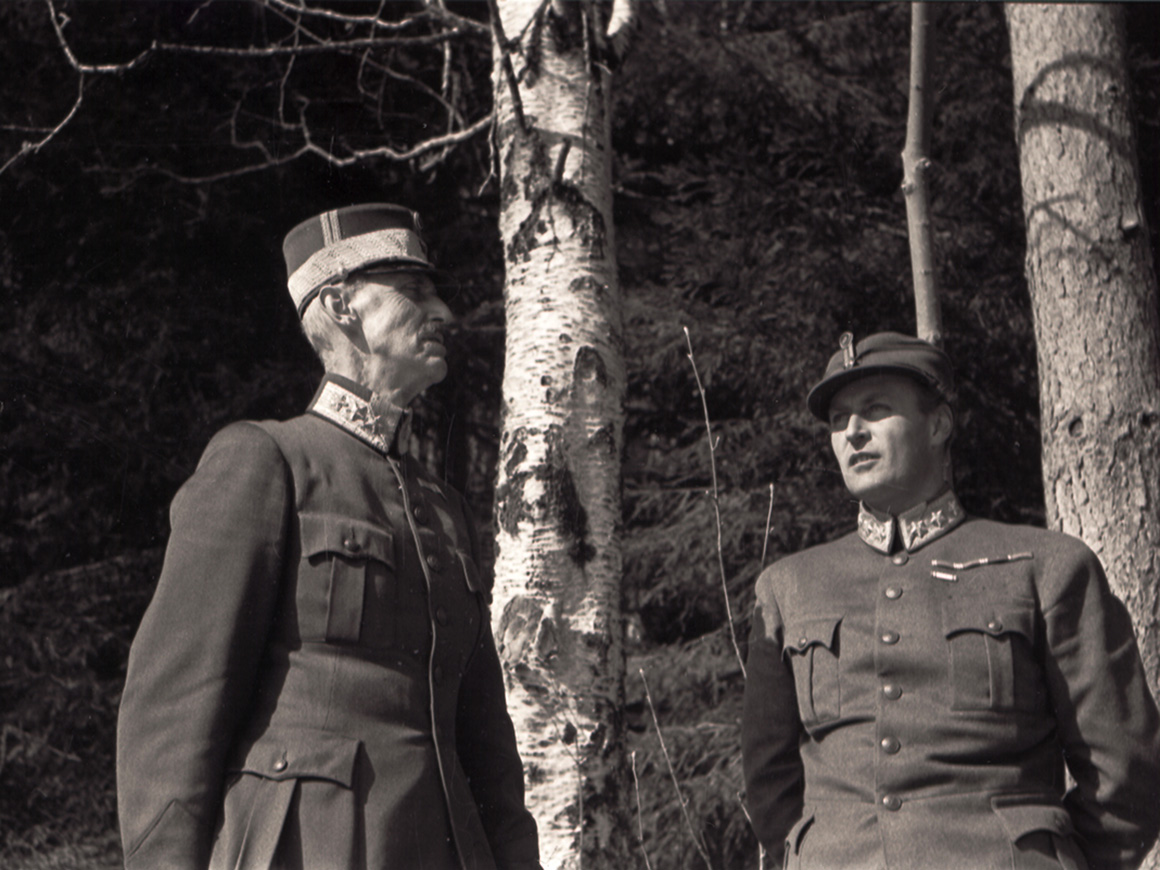
King Haakon and crown prince Olav seeking refuge as the German Luftwaffe bombs in Molde, April 1940

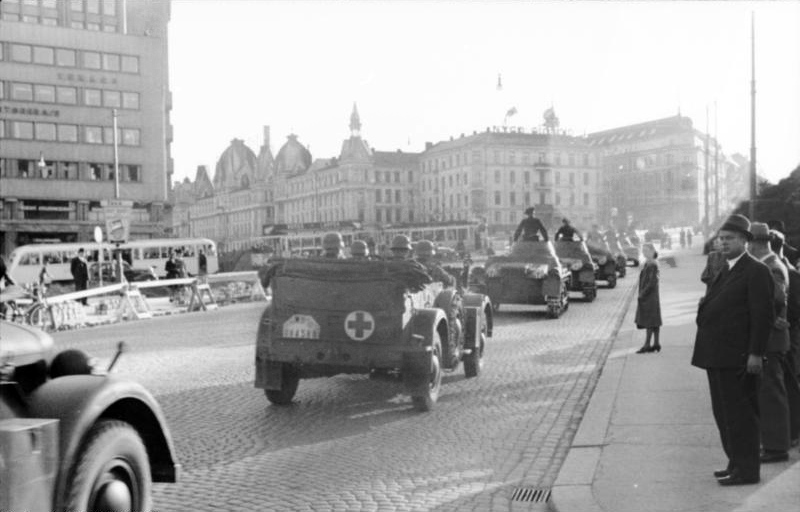
German troops enter Oslo, May 1940. In the background is the Victoria Terrasse, which later became the headquarters of the Gestapo.

Soon after the British and French mined the Norwegian coast to disrupt iron shipments, Germany invaded Norway for several reasons:

- strategically, to secure ice-free harbors from which its naval forces could seek to control the North Atlantic;
- to secure the availability of iron ore from mines in Sweden;
- to pre-empt a British and French invasion with the same purpose; and
- to reinforce the propaganda of a "Germanic empire".

Through neglect both on the part of the Norwegian foreign minister Halvdan Koht and Minister of Defence Birger Ljungberg, Norway was largely unprepared for the German military invasion when it came on the night of 8–9 April 1940. A major storm on 7 April resulted in the British Navy failing to make material contact with the German invasion fleet. Consistent with Blitzkrieg warfare, German forces attacked Norway by sea and air as Operation Weserübung was put into action. The first wave of German attackers counted only about 10,000 men. German ships came into the Oslofjord, but were stopped when the Krupp-built artillery and torpedoes of Oscarsborg Fortress sank the German flagship Blücher and sank or damaged the other ships in the German task force. Blücher transported the forces that would ensure control of the political apparatus in Norway, and the sinking and death of over 1,000 soldiers and crew delayed the Germans, so that the King and government had the chance to escape from Oslo. In the other cities that were attacked, the Germans faced only weak or no resistance. The surprise and the lack of preparedness of Norway for a large-scale invasion of this kind gave the German forces their initial success.

The major Norwegian ports from Oslo northward to Narvik (more than 1,200 mi (1,900 km) away from Germany's naval bases) were occupied by advance detachments of German troops, transported on destroyers. At the same time, a single parachute battalion took the Oslo and Stavanger airfields, and 800 operational aircraft overwhelmed the Norwegian population. Norwegian resistance at Narvik, Trondheim (Norway's second city and the strategic key to Norway), Bergen, Stavanger, and Kristiansand was overcome very quickly, and Oslo's effective resistance to the seaborne forces was nullified when German troops from the airfield entered the city. The first troops to occupy Oslo entered the city brazenly, marching behind a German military brass band. Just 1,500 paratroopers were involved in taking over the Norwegian capital.

On establishing footholds in Oslo and Trondheim, the Germans launched a ground offensive against scattered resistance inland in Norway. Allied forces attempted several counterattacks, but all failed. While resistance in Norway had little military success, it had the significant political effect of allowing the Norwegian government, including the royal family, to escape. The Blücher, which carried the main forces to occupy the capital, was sunk in the Oslofjord on the first day of the invasion. An improvised defence at Midtskogen also prevented a German raid from capturing the king and government.

Norwegian mobilisation was hampered by the loss of much of the best equipment to the Germans in the first 24 hours of the invasion, the unclear mobilisation order by the government, and the general confusion caused by the tremendous psychological shock of the German surprise attack. The Norwegian Army rallied after the initial confusion and on several occasions managed to put up a stiff fight, delaying the German advance. However, the Germans, quickly reinforced by Panzer and motorised machine gun battalions, proved unstoppable due to their superior numbers, training, and equipment. The Norwegian Army therefore planned its campaign as a tactical retreat while awaiting reinforcements from Britain.

The British Navy cleared the way to Narvik on 13 April, sinking one submarine and eight destroyers in the fjord. British and French troops began to land at Narvik on 14 April. Shortly afterward, British troops landed at Namsos and Åndalsnes, to attack Trondheim from the north and from the south, respectively. The Germans, however, landed fresh troops in the rear of the British at Namsos and advanced up the Gudbrandsdal from Oslo against the force at Åndalsnes. By this time, the Germans had about 25,000 men in Norway.

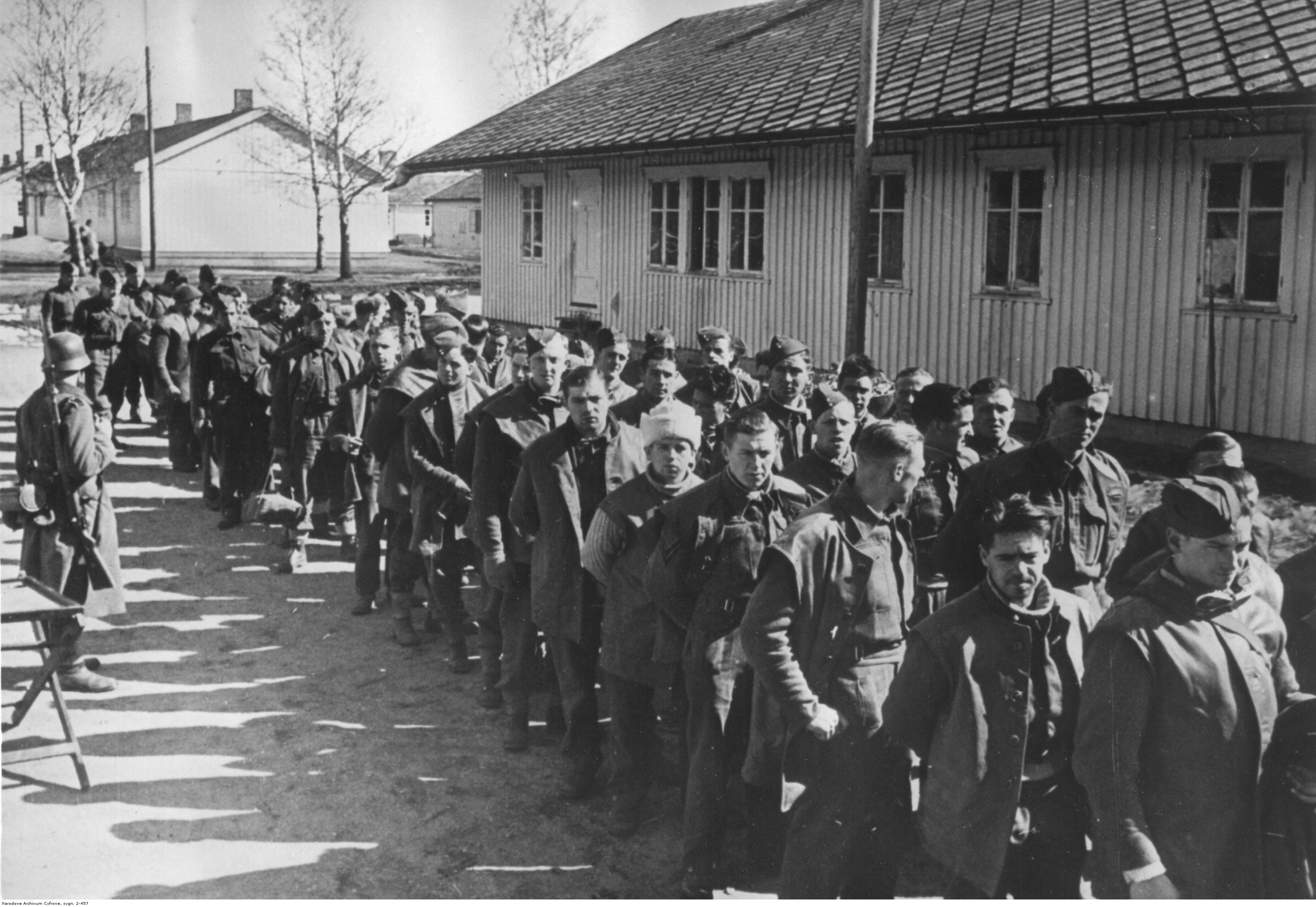
British prisoners of war in Trondheim, May 1940

By 23 April, there was open discussion about evacuating Allied troops, and on 24 April Norwegian troops, supported by French soldiers, failed to stop a Panzer advance. On 26 April the British decided to evacuate Norway.

By 2 May, both Namsos and Åndalsnes were evacuated by the British. On 5 May, the last Norwegian resistance pockets remaining in South and Central Norway were defeated at Vinjesvingen and Hegra Fortress.

In the north, German troops engaged in a bitter fight at the Battle of Narvik. Holding out against five times as many British and French troops, they were close to surrender before finally slipping out from Narvik on 28 May. Moving east, the Germans were surprised when the British started to abandon Narvik on 3 June. By that time the German offensive in France had progressed to such an extent that the British could no longer afford any commitment in Norway, and the 25,000 Britons and Frenchmen were evacuated from Narvik only 10 days after their victory. King Haakon VII and part of his government left for England on the British cruiser HMS Glasgow to establish the Norwegian government-in-exile.

Fighting continued in Northern Norway until 10 June, when the Norwegian 6th Division surrendered shortly after Allied forces had been evacuated against the background of looming defeat in France. Among German-occupied territories in Western Europe, this made Norway the country to withstand the German invasion for the longest period of time – approximately two months.

About 300,000 Germans were garrisoned in Norway for the rest of the war. By occupying Norway, Hitler had ensured the protection of Germany's supply of iron ore from Sweden and had obtained naval and air bases with which to strike at Britain.

== Occupation ==
=== German political and military powers ===
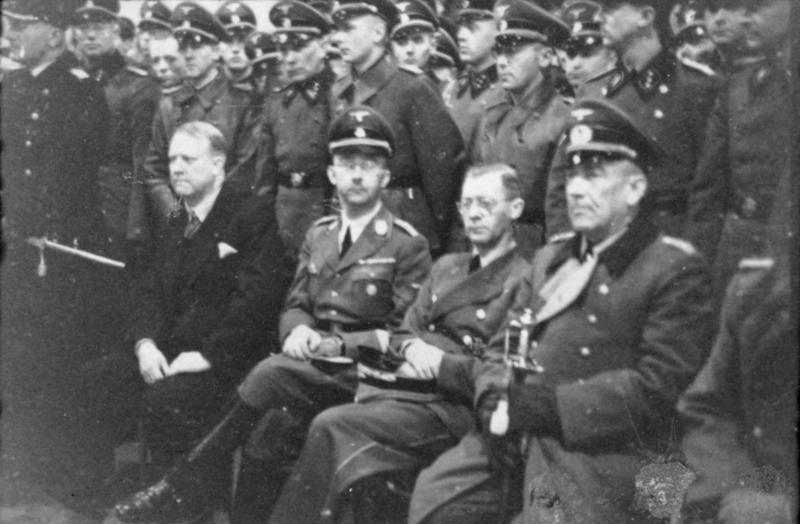
Heinrich Himmler visiting Norway in 1941. Seated (from left to right) are Quisling, Himmler, Terboven, and General Nikolaus von Falkenhorst, the commander of the German forces in Norway.

Prior to the invasion, on 14 and 18 December 1939, Vidkun Quisling, the leader of Norway's fascist party, the Nasjonal Samling ("National Gathering"), had tried to persuade Adolf Hitler that he would form a government in support of occupying Germans. Although Hitler remained unreceptive to the idea, he gave orders to draft up plans for the possible military invasion of Norway. Hence, on the first day of invasion, Quisling, using his own initiative, burst into the NRK studios in Oslo on 9 April and made a nationwide broadcast at 7:30 pm declaring himself prime minister and ordering all resistance halted at once. This did not please the German authorities, who initially wanted the legitimate government to remain in place. Nevertheless, when it became obvious that the Storting would not surrender, the Germans quickly came to recognise Quisling. Hitler not being aware of anyone better, supported him from the evening of 9 April. They demanded that King Haakon formally appoint him as prime minister and return his government to Oslo; in effect, giving legal sanction to the invasion.

When the German ambassador to Norway, Curt Bräuer, presented his government's demands to Haakon, the king let it be known he would abdicate before appointing Quisling prime minister. The Germans reacted by bombing the village they believed the king was occupying. He had been, but had left the village when the sound of bombers was heard. Standing in the snow in a nearby wood, he watched the village of Nybergsund be destroyed. This prompted the Norwegian government to unanimously advise him not to appoint any government headed by Quisling. The invaders realised Quisling's party could not muster any significant support, and quickly pushed him aside. An administrative council led by Ingolf Elster Christensen was therefore established on 15 April to administer those areas which had so far come under German control. The council was abolished on 20 September 1940, when Reichskommissar Josef Terboven took over power by forming his own cabinet. Terboven attempted to negotiate an arrangement with the remaining members of the Norwegian parliament that would give a Nazi cabinet the semblance of legitimacy, but these talks failed.

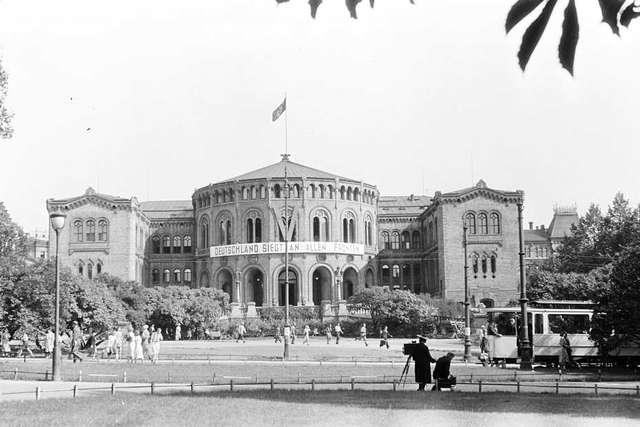
The German-occupied Parliament of Norway Building in 1941

Quisling was consequently re-instituted as head of state on 20 February 1942, although Terboven retained the sole means to use violence as a political tool, which he did on several occasions (e.g. by imposing martial law in Trondheim and ordering the destruction of the village of Telavåg). Quisling believed that by ensuring economic stability and mediating between the Norwegian civilian society and the German occupiers, his party would gradually win the trust and confidence of the Norwegian population. Membership in the Nasjonal Samling did increase slightly in the first few years of the occupation, but never reached significant levels, and eroded towards the end of the war.

Military forces such as the Army Norway (Heer) and Luftwaffe remained under direct command of the Oberkommando der Wehrmacht in Germany throughout the war, but all other authority was vested in the Reich commissioner. The Nazi authorities made attempts to enact legislation that supported its actions and policies; it therefore banned all political parties except NS, appointed local leaders top down and forced labour unions and other organizations to accept NS leaders. Although there was much resistance against most of the Nazi government's policies, there was considerable cooperation in ensuring economic activity and social welfare programs.

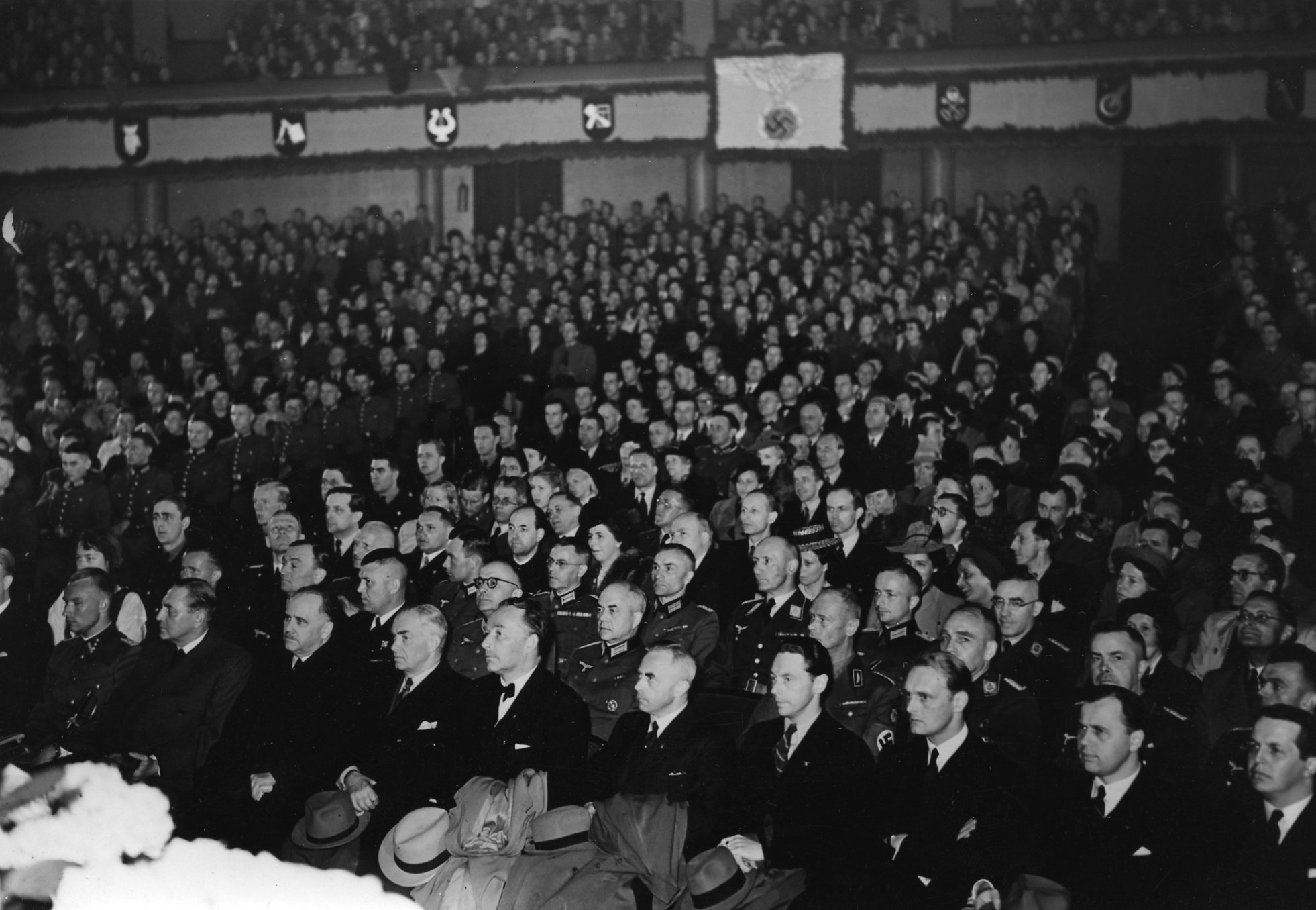
Members of the Norwegian collaborationist government in May 1941

Norway was the most heavily fortified country during the war: several hundred thousand German soldiers were stationed in Norway, in a ratio of one German soldier for every eight Norwegians. Most German soldiers considered themselves fortunate to be in Norway, particularly in comparison with those experiencing savage combat duty on the Eastern Front.

The Schutzstaffel (SS) maintained a strength of six thousand in Norway during the Second World War, under the command of Obergruppenführer Wilhelm Rediess, the Higher SS and Police Leader (HSSPF) from June 1940 to the end of the war. Most of these troops were under the authority of the Waffen-SS and the SS and Police Leader hierarchy. In November 1944, three SS and Police Leaders (SSPF) subordinate to Rediess were appointed: SS-Oberführer Heinz Roch for Northern Norway, Oberführer Richard Kaaserer for Central Norway and Gruppenführer Jakob Sporrenberg for Southern Norway. Also in 1944, the Allgemeine-SS established the 127th SS-Standarte, which was the last command of the General-SS ever created.

The battleship Tirpitz was stationed in Norway for most of the war, acting as a fleet in being in her own right and tying up considerable Allied resources until she was eventually sunk in the last of many attacks.

=== Economic consequences ===
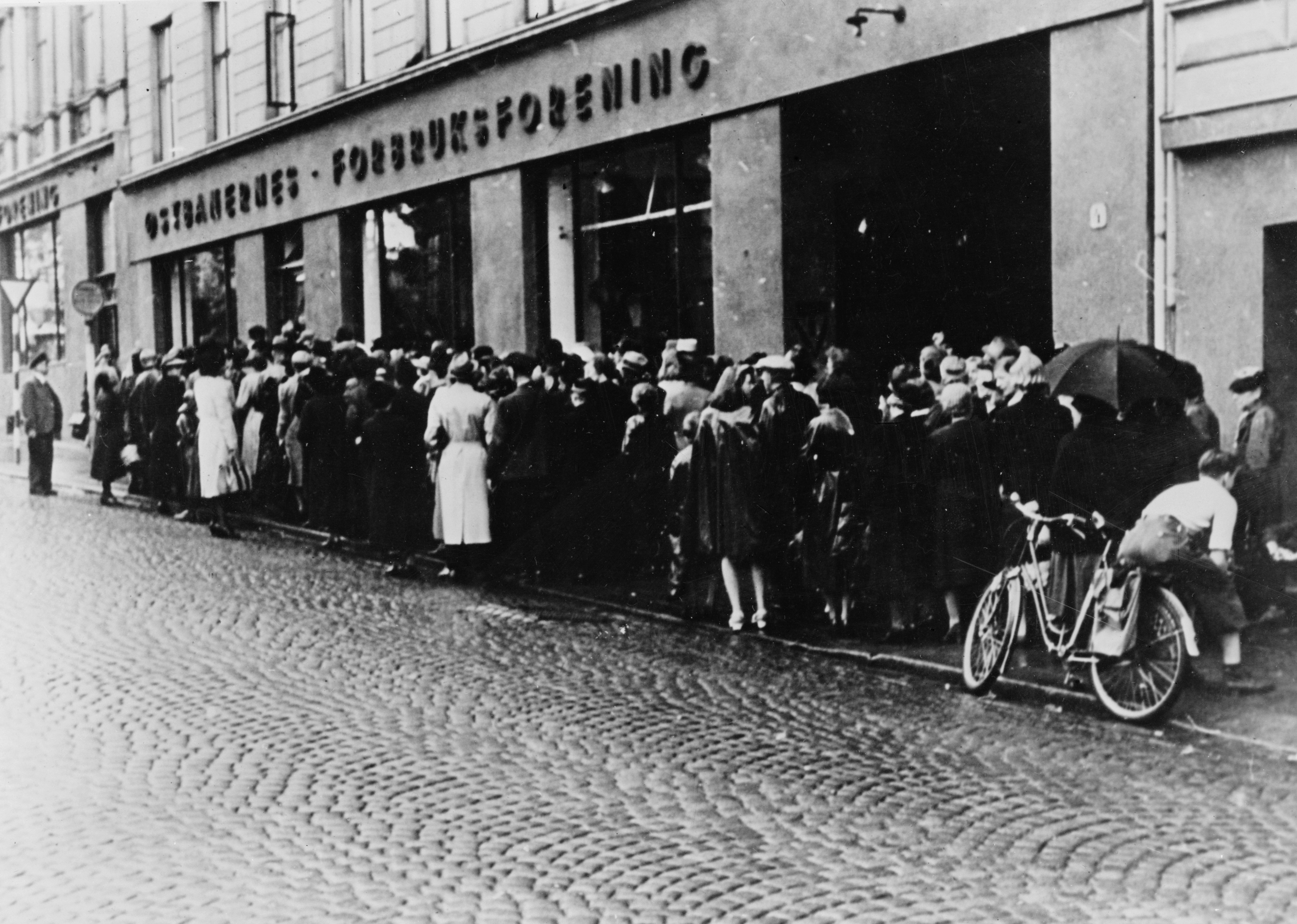
The occupation saw a great rise in food shortages throughout Norway. Here people wait in line for food rations, Oslo, 1942.

The economic consequences of the German occupation were severe. Norway lost all its major trading partners the moment it was occupied. Germany became the main trading partner, but could not make up for the lost import and export business. While production capacity largely remained intact, the German authorities confiscated a very large part of the output, leaving Norway only 43% of its production.

Combined with a general drop in productivity, Norwegians were quickly confronted with a scarcity of basic commodities, including food. There was a real risk of famine. Many, if not most, Norwegians started growing their own crops and keeping their own livestock. City parks were divided among inhabitants, who grew potatoes, cabbage, and other hardy vegetables. People kept pigs, rabbits, chicken and other poultry in their houses and out-buildings. Fishing and hunting became more widespread. Gray and black market provided for flow of goods. Norwegians also learned to use ersatz products for a wide variety of purposes, ranging from fuel to coffee, tea, and tobacco.

=== Holocaust and deportation of Jews ===
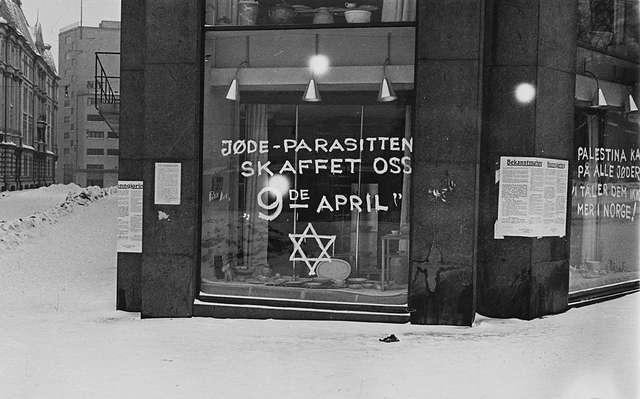
Anti-Semitic graffiti on shop windows in Oslo in 1941 roughly translating to: "The Jew parasite got us 9 April. Palestine calls for all Jews. We don't stand them any more in Norway!"

At the beginning of the occupation, there were at least 2,173 Jews in Norway. At least 775 of these were arrested, detained, and/or deported. 742 were killed in concentration camps, 23 died as a result of extrajudicial execution, murder, and suicide during the war; bringing the total of Jewish Norwegian dead to at least 765, comprising 230 complete households. In addition to the few who survived concentration camps, some also survived by fleeing the country, mostly to Sweden, but some also to the United Kingdom.

=== Acceptance and collaboration ===
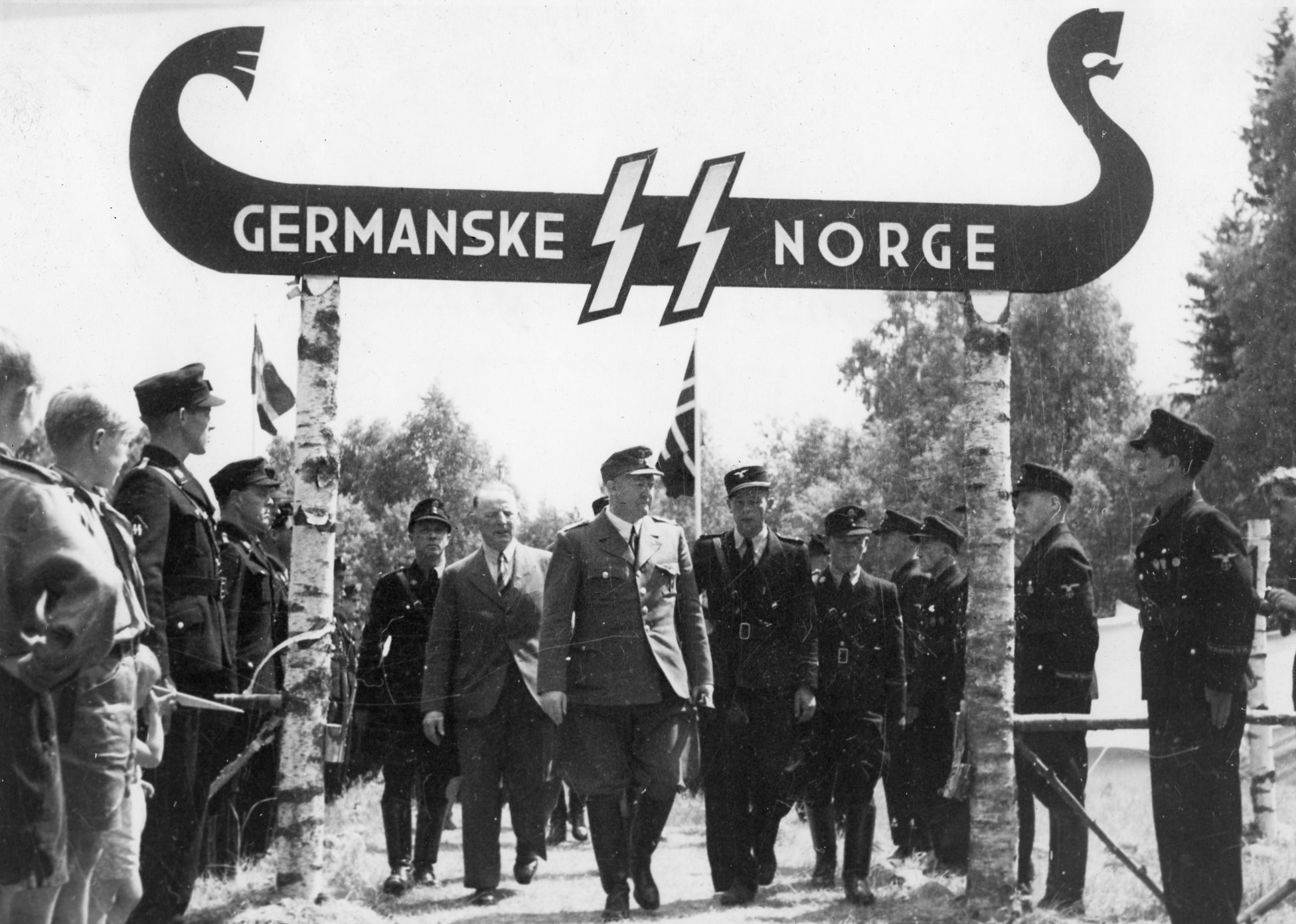
Quisling (in front of the center) at a party event in Borre National Park is under a portal that promotes Germanske SS Norge in 1941.

Of the Norwegians who supported the Nasjonal Samling party, relatively few were active collaborators. Most notorious among these was Henry Rinnan, the leader of the Sonderabteilung Lola (locally known as Rinnanbanden or "the Rinnan gang"), a group of informants who infiltrated the Norwegian resistance, hence managing to capture and murder many of its members.

Other collaborators were Statspolitiet (STAPO), a police force that operated independently of the regular police. Statspolitiet was closely related to the Quisling regime and also took orders directly from the German Sicherheitspolizei.

Hirden was a fascist paramilitary force with party members subordinate to the ruling party. Hirden had a broad mandate that included the use of violence.

Furthermore, about 15,000 Norwegians volunteered for combat duty on the Nazi side; of the 6,000 sent into action as part of the Germanic SS, most were sent to the Eastern front.

=== Resistance movement ===
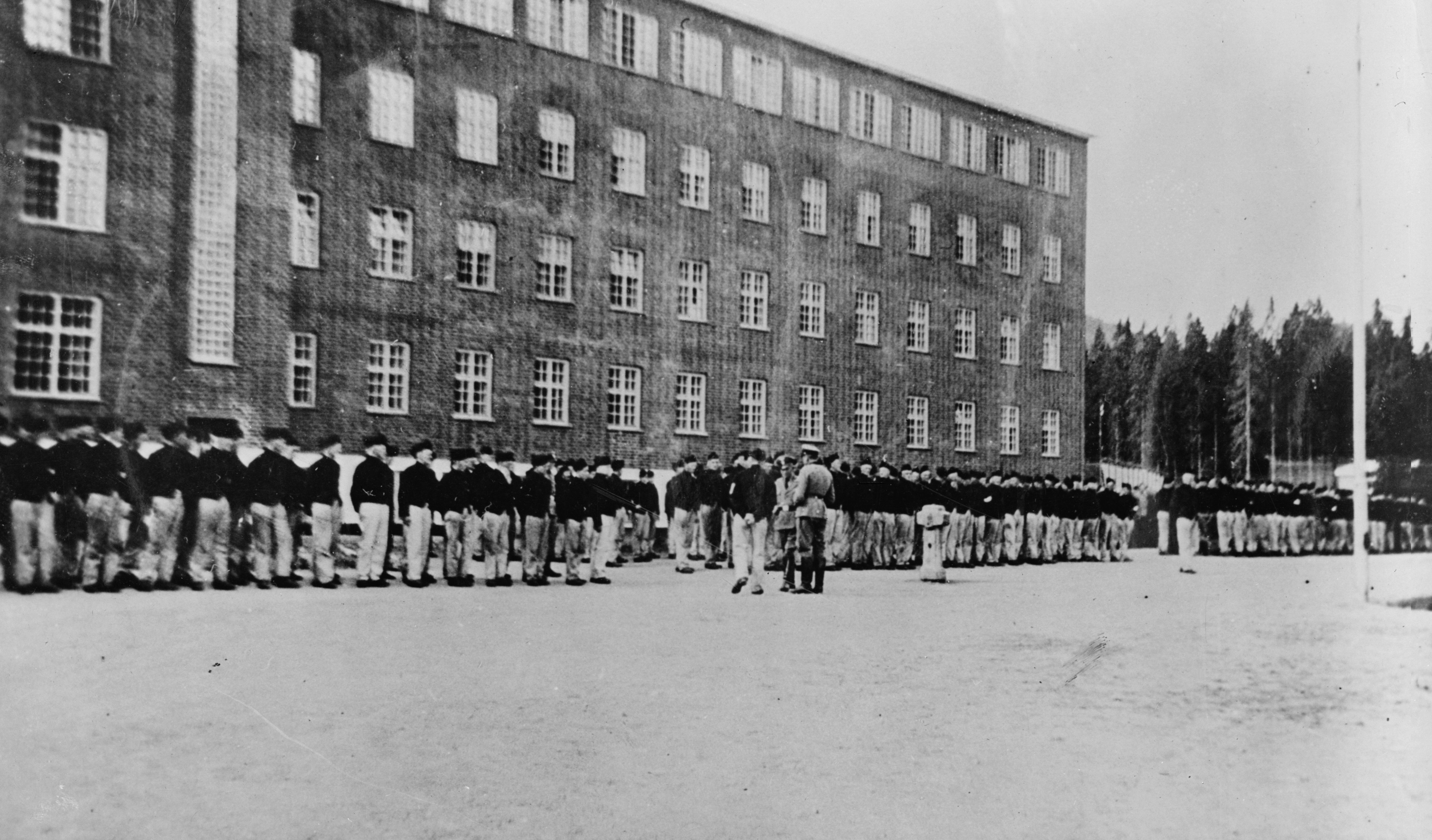
The Grini concentration camp, where most political prisoners were interned

Over time, an organized armed resistance movement, known as Milorg and numbering some 40,000 armed men at the end of the war, was formed under a largely unified command, something which greatly facilitated the transfer of power in May 1945.

A distinction was made between the home front (Hjemmefronten) and the external front (Utefronten). The home front consisted of sabotage, raids and clandestine operations (as was often performed by members of Milorg), as well as intelligence gathering (for which XU was founded). Meanwhile, the external front included Norway's merchant fleet, the Royal Norwegian Navy (which had evacuated many of its ships to Britain), Norwegian squadrons under the British Royal Air Force command and several commando groups operating out of Great Britain and Shetland.

One of the most successful actions undertaken by the Norwegian resistance was the Norwegian heavy water sabotage, which crippled the German nuclear energy project. Prominent resistance members, among them Max Manus and Gunnar Sønsteby, destroyed several ships and supplies of the Kriegsmarine. Radical organizations such as the Osvald Group sabotaged a number of trains and railways. However most organizations opted for passive resistance.

Illegal newspapers were distributed, including Friheten, Vårt Land, Fritt Land. Illegal trade union periodicals included Fri Fagbevegelse.

=== Exiled Norwegian forces ===
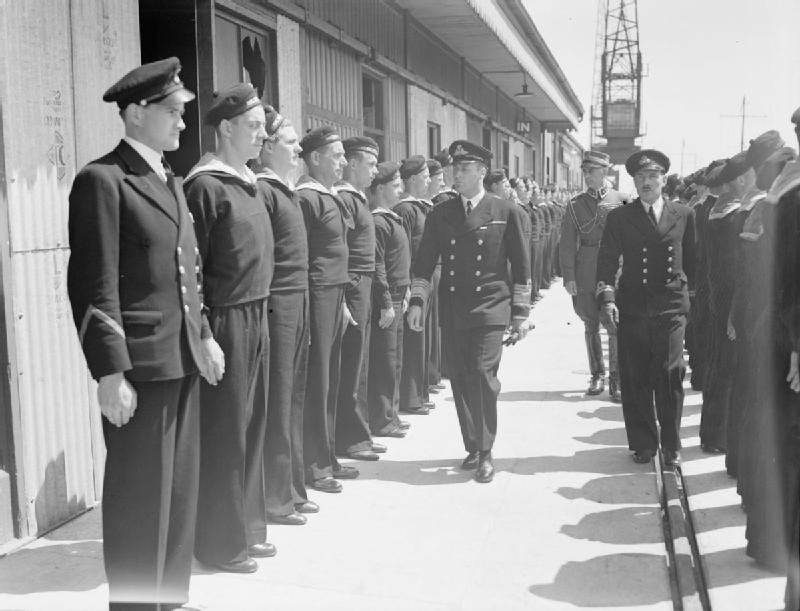
Crown Prince Olav V inspecting Norwegian sailors in the United Kingdom

About 80,000 Norwegian citizens fled the country during the course of the war; apart from political and military forces they included intellectuals such as Sigrid Undset. Since the Norwegian parliament continued to operate in exile in Britain, many of these exiles voluntarily came to serve in the Allied military forces, often forming their own distinct Norwegian units in accordance with the Allied Forces Act. By the end of the war, these forces consisted of some 28,000 enlisted men and women.

==== Navy ====
In June 1940, some 13 warships and 5 aircraft of the Royal Norwegian Navy, including their 500 operating personnel, followed the King and parliament to Britain. Throughout the war, some 118 ships served the Royal Norwegian Navy, of which 58 were in active service at the end of the war. By then the Royal Norwegian Navy had continuously and actively served Allied forces since the summer of 1940, and had suffered the loss of 27 ships and 650 men.

==== Air Force ====
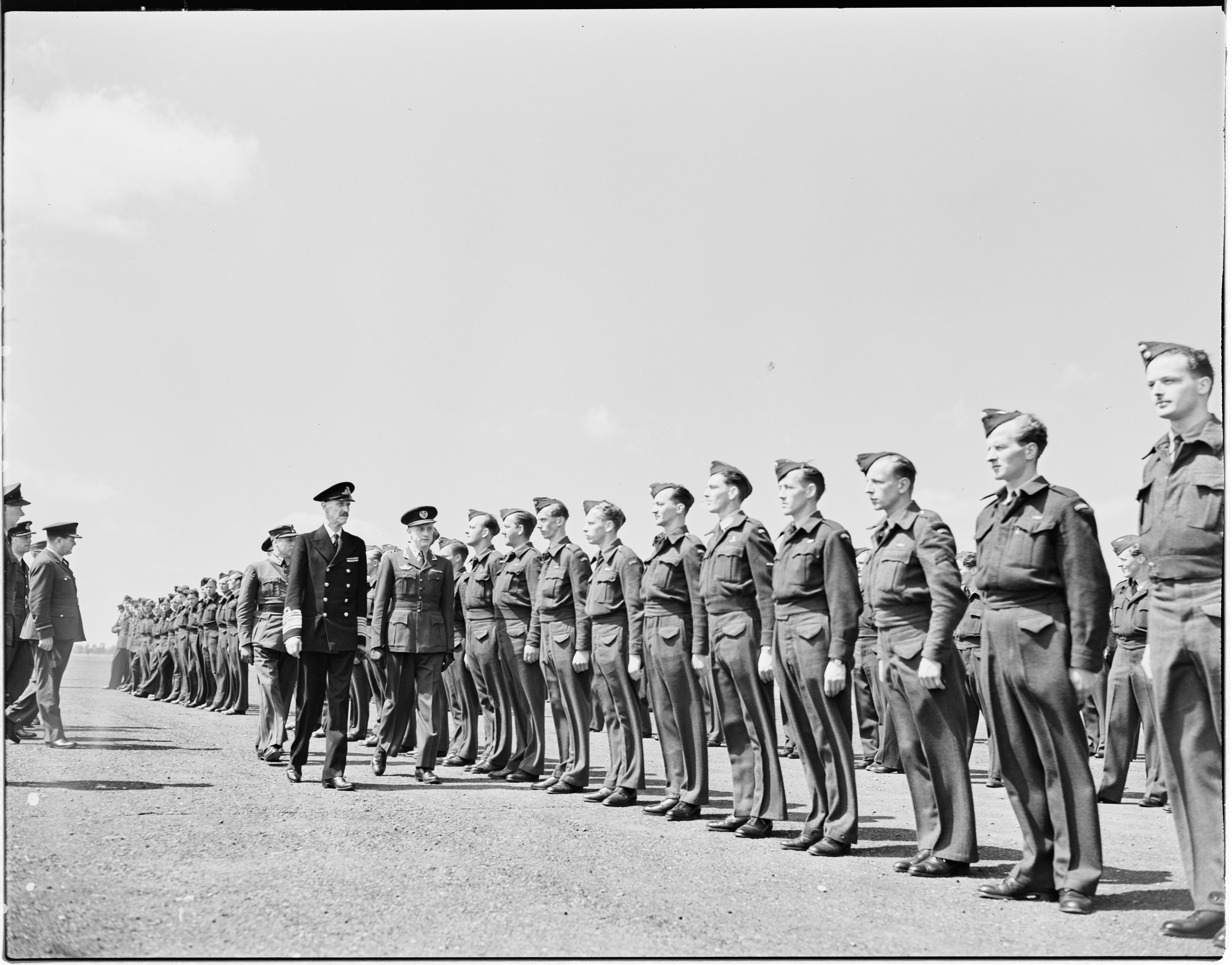
King Haakon VII with Norwegian pilots in the United Kingdom

In order to develop and train an Air Force, a training camp known as "Little Norway" was set up near Toronto, Canada, on 10 November 1940. However, a unified Royal Norwegian Air Force was only founded as a separate branch of the military of Norway on 10 November 1944; until then it operated in two distinct branches—then known as the Royal Norwegian Navy Air Service and the Norwegian Army Air Service.

The Air Force operated four squadrons in support of Allied forces:

- No. 330 Squadron RNoAF
- No. 331 Squadron RNoAF
- No. 332 Squadron RNoAF
- No. 333 Squadron RNoAF

A number of Norwegian volunteers also served in British RAF units. Combined, the Norwegian fighter squadrons (No. 331 and 332) and Norwegian fighters operating in RAF service accounted for a total of 247 enemy aircraft destroyed, 42 assumed destroyed and 142 damaged. By the war's end, the Norwegian Air Force had a total of 2,700 personnel and had suffered a total of 228 losses.

==== Army ====
The Norwegian Army was given the lowest priority of all the exiled Norwegian forces; it never exceeded 4,000 men. Following its last reorganisation in 1942, the Army consisted of the following units:

- Scottish Brigade
- Norwegian Independent Company 1 (initially serving British SOE operations)
- No. 5 Troop of the 10th Inter-Allied Commando
- Norwegian "Iceland" Company (Teaching American and British troops in winter warfare)
- Svalbard garrison
- Jan Mayen garrison
- South Georgia garrison
- Coastal artillery group
- Hospital unit

=== Allied raids in Norway ===
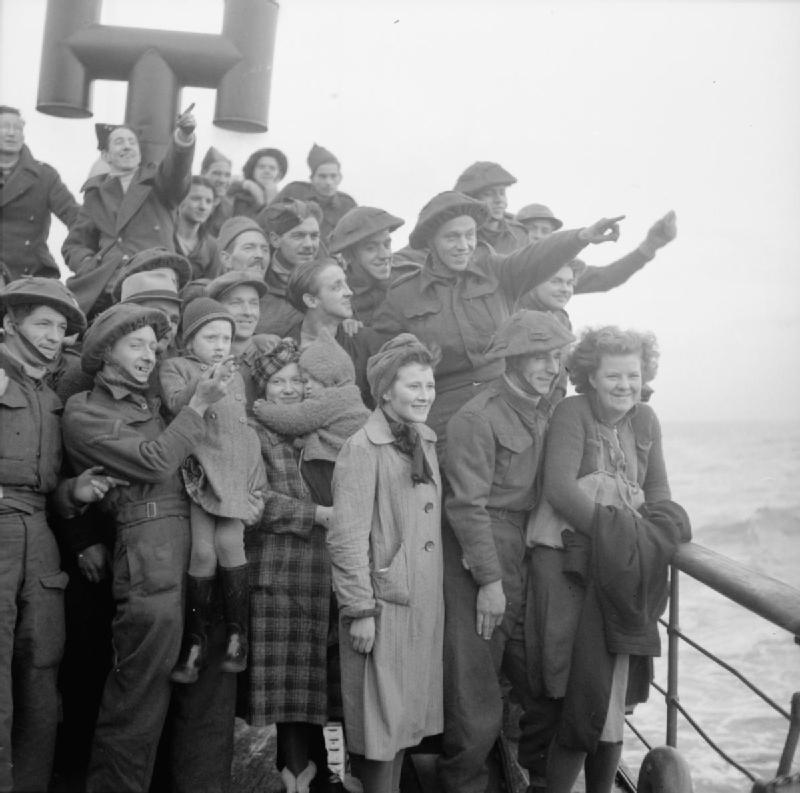
British troops with Norwegian civilians after the Måløy Raid on 27 December 1941

Throughout the war, Allied planners remained wary of the strategic significance of Norway. Commando raids were carried out in several locations; some with the intention of deceiving German commanders as part of Operation Fortitude North, others with the explicit aim of disrupting German military and scientific capabilities, such as sabotaging the German nuclear energy project. Many of these allied raids were achieved with the help of exiled Norwegian forces. However, Churchill was obsessed with an invasion of Norway and kept badgering Alanbrooke; see Operation Jupiter (Norway).

Notable military operations in Norway include:

- Operation Claymore
- Operation Gauntlet
- Operation Anklet
- Operation Archery
- Operation Musketoon
- Operation Freshman
- Operation Checkmate
- Operation Judgement

== Liberation ==
=== Lapland War, Soviet advance, and retreat of the German army ===
Map showing the German army's retreat from Finland and, shortly thereafter, from Finnmark in northern Norway

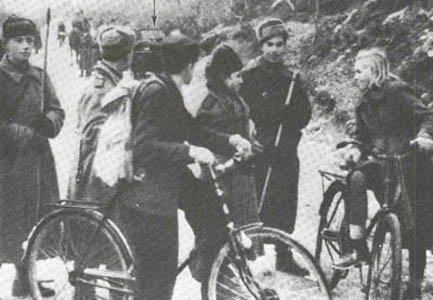
Soviet soldiers meet local Norwegian inhabitants.

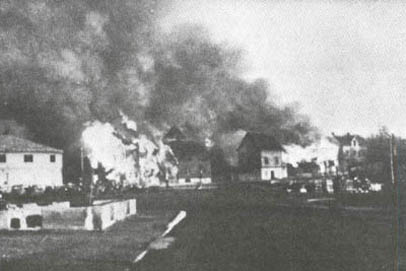
The town of Kirkenes was left severely damaged following the withdrawal of German forces.

With the beginning of the German withdrawal from Lapland, the initial German plan was to retain the essential nickel mines around Petsamo in the far North held by the 19th Mountain Corps under General Ferdinand Jodl, but events led to the Oberkommando der Wehrmacht ordering the entire 20th Mountain Army out of Finland to take up new defensive positions around Lyngen and Skibotn just to the north of Tromsø—a new operation which came to be called "Operation Nordlicht" (Operation Northern Light). This proved to be a huge logistical undertaking. General Lothar Rendulic, replacing General Eduard Dietl, who had been killed in an air crash, set about evacuating supplies by sea through Petsamo and the Norwegian town of Kirkenes.

In early October 1944, some 53,000 men of the German 19th Mountain Corps were still 45 mi (72 km) inside Russia along the Litsa River and the neck of the Rybachy Peninsula. The plan was for them to reach Lakselv in Norway, 160 mi (260 km) west, by 15 November. By 7 October however, the combined Soviet 14th Army and Northern fleet, consisting of 133,500 men under Field Marshal Kirill Meretskov, attacked the weakest point of the German line, the junction between the 2nd and 6th Mountain Divisions.

A Soviet Naval Brigade also made an amphibious landing to the west of Rybachy, thereby outflanking the Germans. Rendulic, fearing an encirclement of his forces, ordered the 19th Mountain Corps to fall back into Norway. With the Soviets hard on their heels, the Corps reached Kirkenes by 20 October. The German High Command ordered Rendulic to hold the Soviets at bay whilst vital supplies amounting to some 135,000 short tons (122,000 t) could be shipped to safety. Five days later, when the German army prepared to withdraw, only around 45,000 short tons (41,000 t) had been saved.

As a result of the German scorched earth policy, Kirkenes was virtually destroyed by the Germans before pulling out: the town was set on fire, port installations and offices were blown up and only a few small houses were left standing. This scene was to be repeated throughout Finnmark, an area larger than Denmark. The Germans were determined to leave nothing of value to the Soviets, as Hitler had ordered Rendulic to leave the area devoid of people, shelter and supplies. Some 43,000 people complied with the order to evacuate the region immediately; those who refused were forced to leave their homes. Some nonetheless stayed behind to await the departure of the Germans: it was estimated that 23,000–25,000 people remained in East-Finnmark by the end of November, they hid in the wilderness until the Germans had left.

The Soviets pursued the Germans over the following days, and fighting occurred around the small settlements of Munkelv and Neiden to the west of Kirkenes around 27 October. The German 6th Mountain Division, acting as rear-guard, slowly withdrew up the main road along the coast (known as Riksvei 50, now called the E6) until reaching Tanafjord, some 70 mi (110 km) north-west of Kirkenes, which they reached on 6 November. It was to be their last contact with Soviet troops.

However, the advance of the Soviet troops stopped and West-Finnmark and North-Troms became a no-man's land between the Soviet army and the German army. Here, several thousand people lived in hiding the whole winter 1944/1945. These people were called cave people, living in caves, in huts made of driftwood and/or turf, under boats turned upside down, etc. The risk of being discovered by patrolling German boats was a constant threat during the months waiting for liberation.

=== Exiled Norwegian troops liberate Finnmark ===
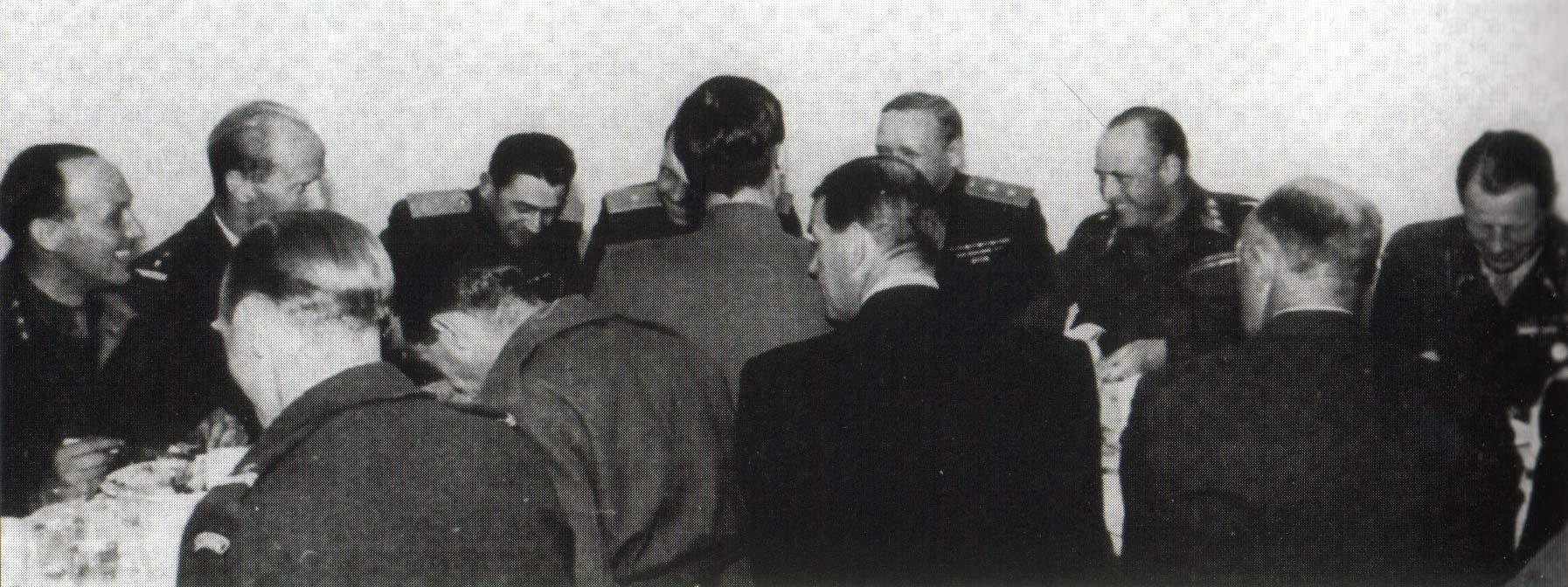
Dinner party in Kirkenes in July 1945. Soviet troops withdrew from Norwegian territory on 25 September 1945. At the rear from right: Colonel Arne Dagfin Dahl, Crown Prince Olav and Commander Soviet Forces in Norway Lieutenant General Sherbakov.

On 25 October 1944, the order was given for a Norwegian force in Britain to set sail for Murmansk to join the Soviet forces now entering Northern Norway. The convoy was named Force 138 and the operation was called "Operation Crofter".

Led by Oberst Arne D. Dahl:

- A military mission responsible for creating a liaison with the Soviets and setting up a civil administration,
- Bergkompanie 2 under Major S. Rongstad with 233 men,
- A naval area command with 11 men,
- "Area command Finnmark" consisting of 12 men.

The force arrived in Murmansk on 6 November and went with a Soviet ship to Liinakhamari in North-western Soviet Union (former North-eastern Finland), from where trucks took them to Norway, arriving on 10 November. The Soviet commander, Lieutenant General Sherbakov, made it clear that he wanted the Norwegian Bergkompani to take over the forward positions as soon as possible. Volunteers from the local population were hastily formed into "guard companies" armed with Soviet weapons pending the arrival of more troops from either Sweden or Britain. The first convoy arrived from Britain on 7 December and included two Norwegian corvettes (one of which was later damaged by a mine) and three minesweepers.

It soon became obvious that reconnaissance patrols needed to be sent out to observe German activities and discover whether or not the population of Finnmark had been evacuated. The reports came back stating that the Germans were in the process of pulling back from the Porsanger Peninsula, but were laying mines and booby-traps along the way, a few people were left here and there and many of the buildings were burnt down.

This remained the situation into 1945. In the new year the Norwegian forces slowly retook Finnmark, helping the local population in the arctic winter and dealing with occasional German raids from the air, sea and land as well as the ever-present danger from mines. Reinforcements arrived from the Norwegian Rikspoliti based in Sweden as well as convoys from Britain. A total of 1,442 people and 1,225 short tons (1,111 t) of material were flown in by Dakota transport aircraft from Kallax in Sweden to Finnmark, and by April the Norwegian forces numbered over 3,000 men. On 26 April the Norwegian command sent out a message that Finnmark was free. When the Germans finally capitulated on 8 May 1945, the 1st company of the Varanger battalion was positioned along the Finnmark-Troms border to the west of Alta.

=== End of German occupation ===
Newsreel about the liberation of Norway

Towards the end of the war, in March 1945, Norwegian Reichskommissar Josef Terboven had considered plans to make Norway the last bastion of the Third Reich and a last sanctum for German leaders. However, following Adolf Hitler's suicide on 30 April, Hitler's successor Admiral Karl Dönitz summoned Terboven and General Franz Böhme, Commander-in-Chief of German forces in Norway, to a meeting in Flensburg, where they were ordered to follow the General headquarters' instructions. On his return to Norway, General Böhme issued a secret directive to his commanders in which he ordered "unconditional military obedience" and "iron discipline".

German forces in Denmark surrendered on 5 May, and on the same day, General Eisenhower dispatched a telegram to resistance headquarters in Norway, which was passed on to General Böhme; it contained information on how to make contact with Allied General Headquarters. With only around 30,000 troops on hand, General Montgomery opted to exclude the surrender of Norway from the May 5 surrenders that included Denmark, Holland and northeast Germany and tasked Sir Andrew Thorne, GOC-in-C Scottish Command, to negotiate the surrender of some 350,000 German troops in Norway.

Dönitz dismissed Terboven from his post as Reichskommissar on 7 May, transferring his powers to General Böhme. At 21:10 on the same day, the German High Command ordered Böhme to follow the capitulation plans, and he made a radio broadcast at 22:00 in which he declared that German forces in Norway would obey orders. This led to an immediate and full mobilisation of the Milorg underground resistance movement—more than 40,000 armed Norwegians were summoned to occupy the Royal Palace, Oslo's main police station, as well as other public buildings. A planned Norwegian administration was set up overnight.

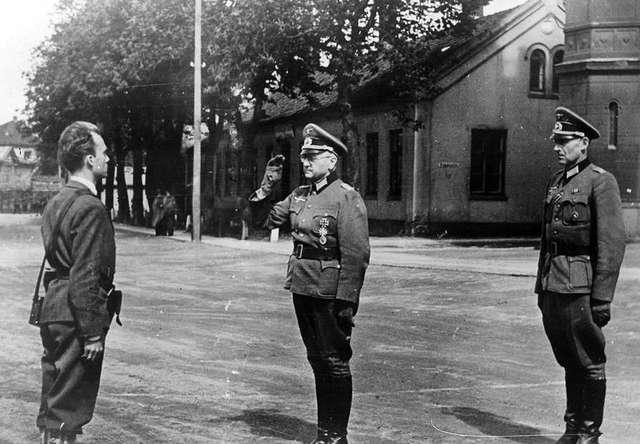
Germans surrender Akershus Fortress to Terje Rollem on 11 May 1945.

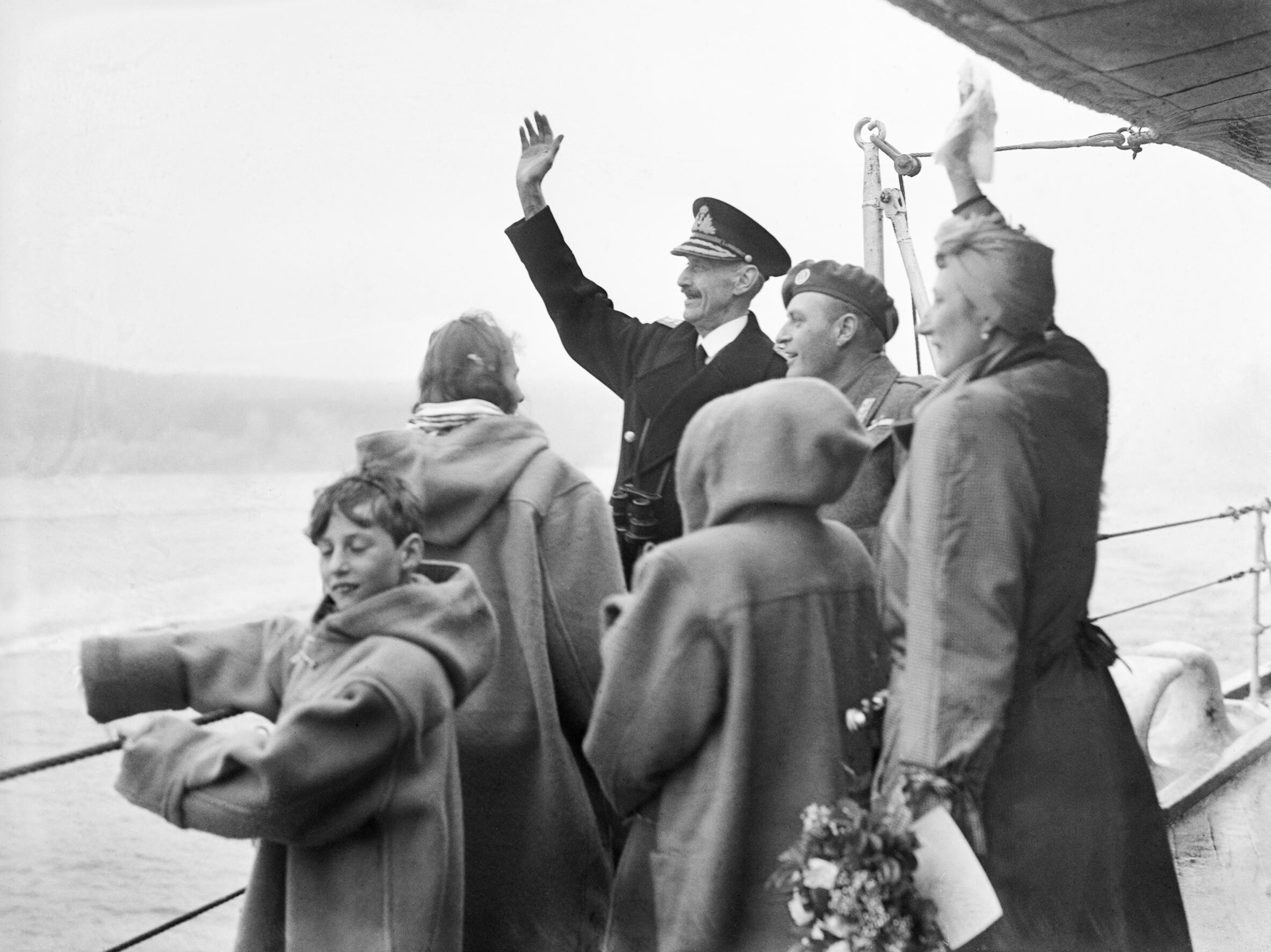
Norwegian royal family waving at the crowds in Oslo upon returning from exile

The following afternoon, on 8 May, an Allied military mission arrived in Oslo to deliver the conditions for capitulation to the Germans, and arranged the surrender, which took effect at midnight. The conditions included the German High Command agreeing to arrest and intern all German and Norwegian Nazi party members listed by the Allies, disarm and intern all SS troops, and send all German forces to designated areas. Several of the high ranking Nazi and SS officials chose to kill themselves rather than surrender. Among those who committed suicide between 8–10 May were Terboven, Rediess and Roch. At this time there were no fewer than 400,000 German soldiers in Norway, which had a population of barely three million.

Following the surrender, detachments of regular Norwegian and Allied troops were sent to Norway, which included 13,000 Norwegians trained in Sweden and 30,000 Britons and Americans. Official representatives of the Norwegian civil authorities followed soon after these military forces, with Crown Prince Olav arriving in Oslo on a British cruiser on 14 May, with a 21-man delegation of Norwegian government officials headed up by Sverre Støstad and Paul Hartmann, with the remainder of the Norwegian government and the London-based administration following on the UK troopship Andes. Finally, on 7 June, which also happened to be the 40th anniversary of the dissolution of Norway's union with Sweden, King Haakon VII and the remaining members of the royal family arrived in Oslo onboard the British cruiser HMS Norfolk. General Sir Andrew Thorne, Commander-in-Chief of Allied forces in Norway, transferred power to King Haakon that same day.

Following the liberation, the Norwegian government-in-exile was replaced by a coalition led by Einar Gerhardsen which governed until the autumn of 1945 when the first postwar general election was held, returning Gerhardsen as prime minister, at the head of a Labour Party government.

Norwegian survivors began to emerge from the German concentration camps. By war's end, 92,000 Norwegians were located abroad, including 46,000 in Sweden. Besides German occupiers, 141,000 foreign nationals were located in Norway, mostly now-liberated prisoners of war held by the Germans. These included 84,000 Russians.

A total of 10,262 Norwegians lost their lives in the conflict or while imprisoned. Approximately 50,000 Norwegians were arrested by the Germans during the occupation. Of these, 9,000 were consigned to prison camps outside Norway, including Stutthof concentration camp.

== Aftermath ==
=== Lebensborn and war children ===
During the five-year occupation, several thousand Norwegian women had children fathered by German soldiers in the Lebensborn program. The mothers were ostracised and humiliated after the war both by Norwegian officialdom and the civilian population, and were called names such as tyskertøser ("whores of [the] Germans"). Many of these women were detained at internment camps such as the one on Hovedøya, and some were even deported to Germany. The children of these unions received names like tyskerunger (children of Germans) or worse yet naziyngel (Nazi spawn). The debate on the past treatment of these krigsbarn (war children) started with a television series in 1981, but only recently have the offspring of these unions begun to identify themselves. Fritz Moen, the only known victim of dual miscarriage of justice in Europe, was the child of a Norwegian woman and a German soldier, as was ABBA member Anni-Frid Lyngstad.

=== Refugees ===
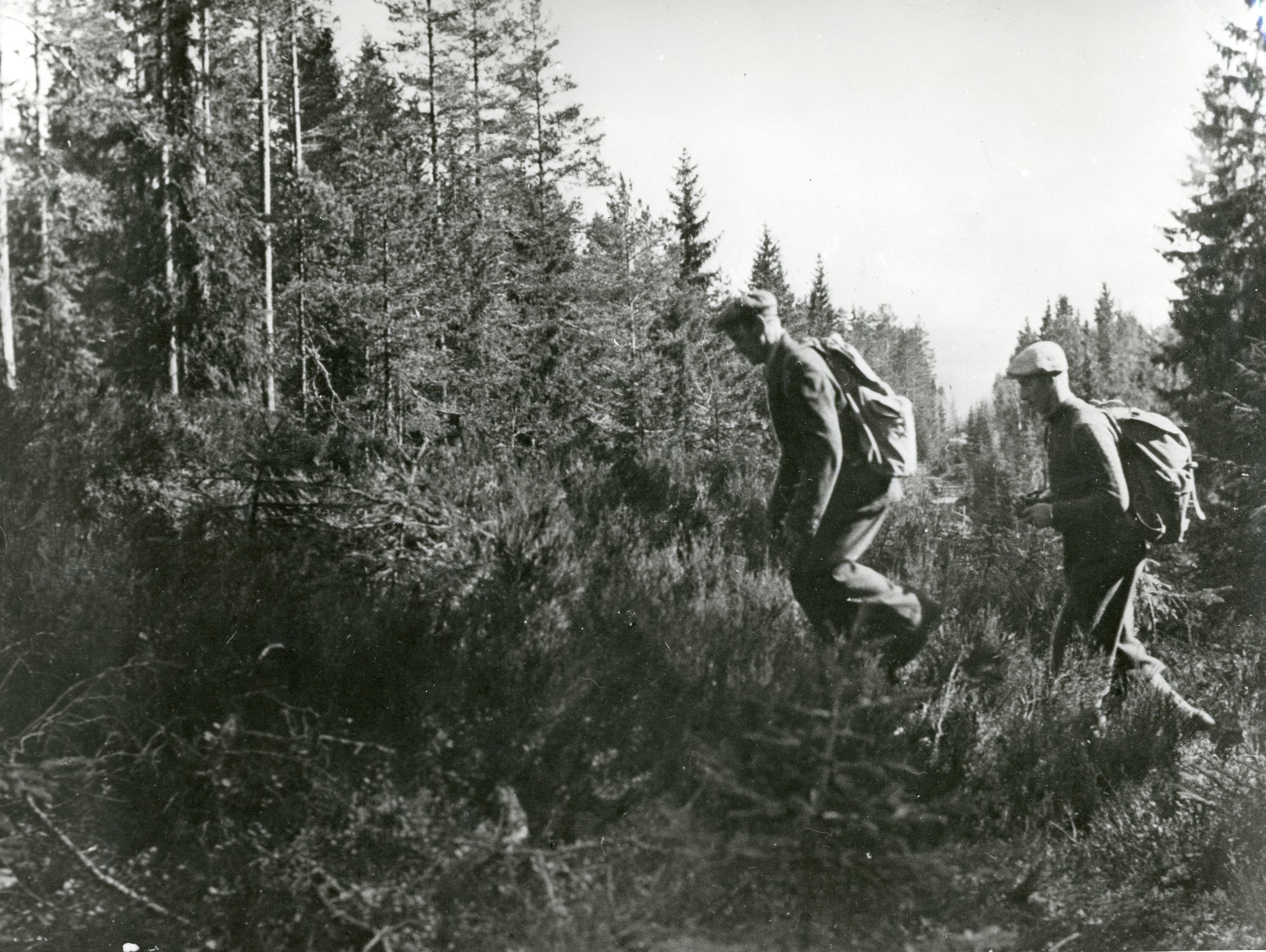
Norwegian refugees passing the open area cut in the woods between Norway and Sweden

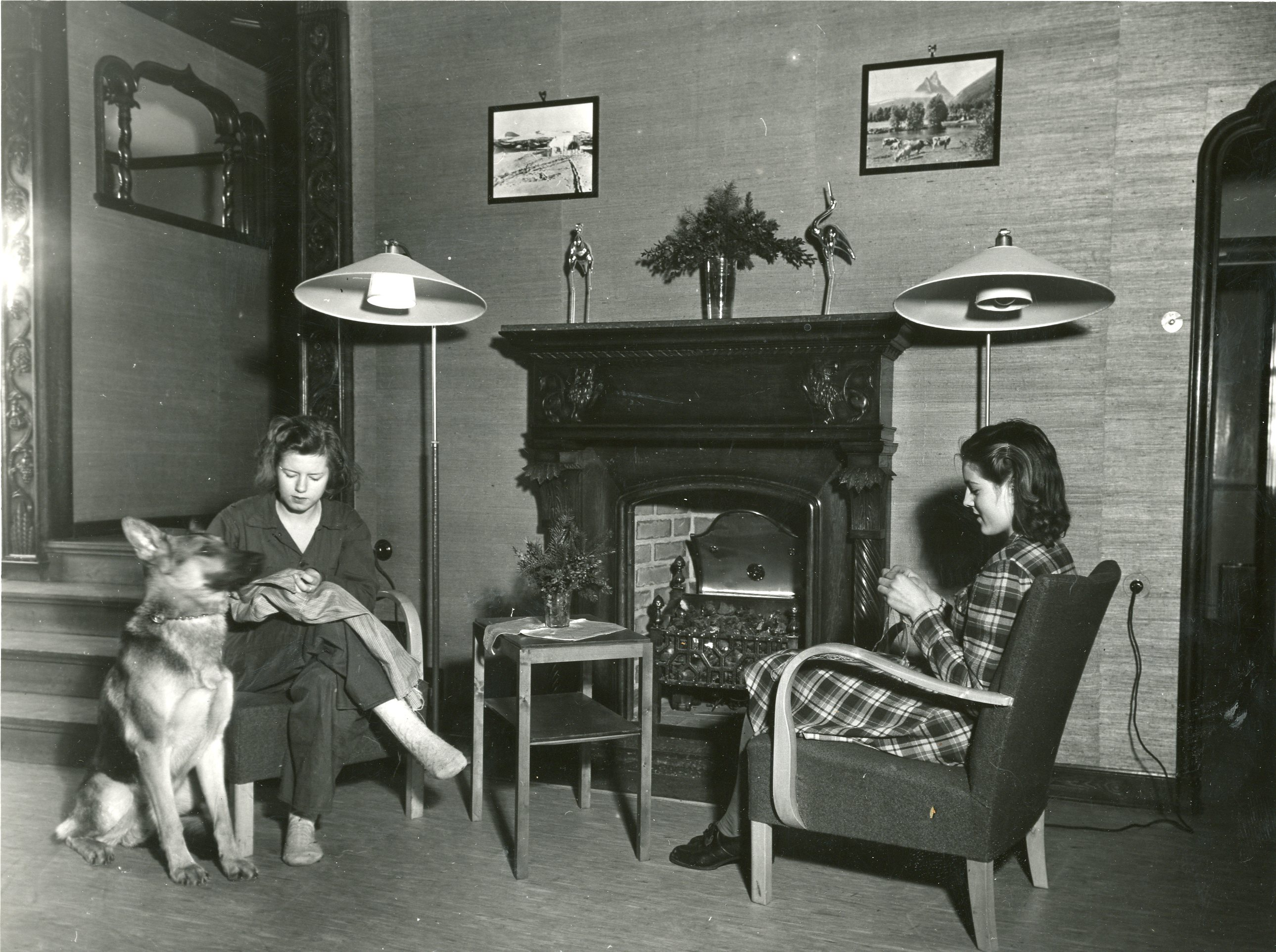
Refugees were often confined to camps where only their basic needs were met.

Throughout the war years, a number of Norwegians fled the Nazi regime, mostly across the border to Sweden. These included Norwegian Jews, political activists, and others who had reason to fear for their lives. The Nazis set up border patrols to stop these flights across the very long border, but locals who knew the woods found ways to bypass them. These "border pilots", and people who hid refugees in their homes, were among those in the resistance movement who took the greatest risks.

About 50,000 Norwegians fled to Sweden during the war. At first Norwegian refugees were met by Swedish immigration authorities and several hundred were turned away as ineligible to enter Sweden. Norwegian military members were interned as required by the Hague Conventions. Later, all Norwegians were regarded as political refugees. Reception centres were established from 1941. From 1942 to 1945, the main Norwegian refugee centre was located at Kjesäter near to Vingåker; 42,800 Norwegians passed through Kjesäter during the war.

Sweden received about 900 Norwegian Jews, about half of Norway's Jewish population.

A great many refugees were men of military age wishing to join the Norwegian armed forces abroad. Before the German invasion of Russia, a number of them managed to make their way out of Sweden and travel via Russian territory to Britain, often via India, South Africa or Canada. After Operation Barbarossa, the overland route over Russian soil was closed.

In the last two years of the war, the Norwegian government in exile in London obtained permission and cooperation from the Swedish authorities to secretly raise military formations on Swedish territory in the form of the so-called "Police troops" (Polititroppene) recruited from Norwegian refugees. Some were indeed police, and Sweden did not allow weapons training in a few camps, but for most the term "Police" was a cover-up for what in reality was pure military training. These formations, numbering 12,000 men organised into battalions and with their own pioneers, signals and artillery by VE Day, were equipped with Swedish weapons and equipment and trained by Norwegian and Swedish officers.

A number of the "Police troops" were employed in the liberation of Finnmark in the winter of 1944/45 after the area had been evacuated by the Germans. The rest participated in the liberation of the rest of Norway after the German surrender in May 1945.

=== Treason trials ===
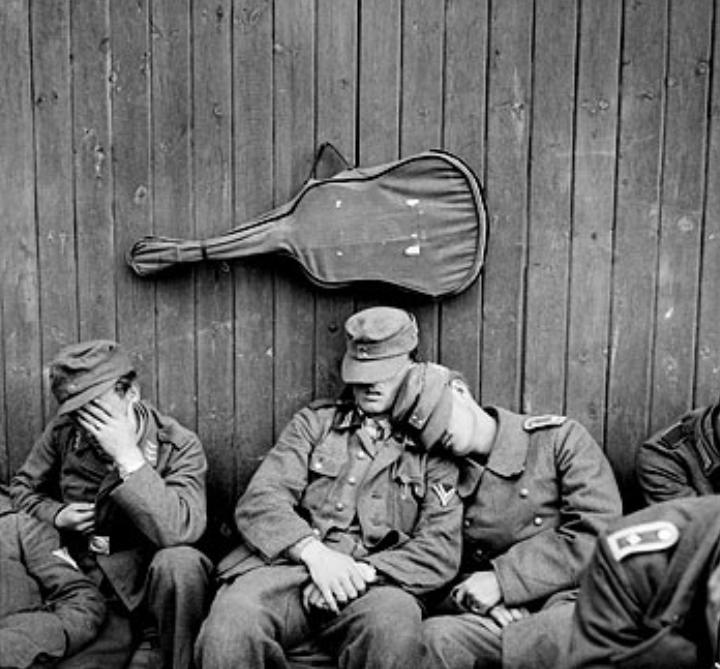
German soldiers waiting at a camp in Mandal to be returned home to Germany, August 1945

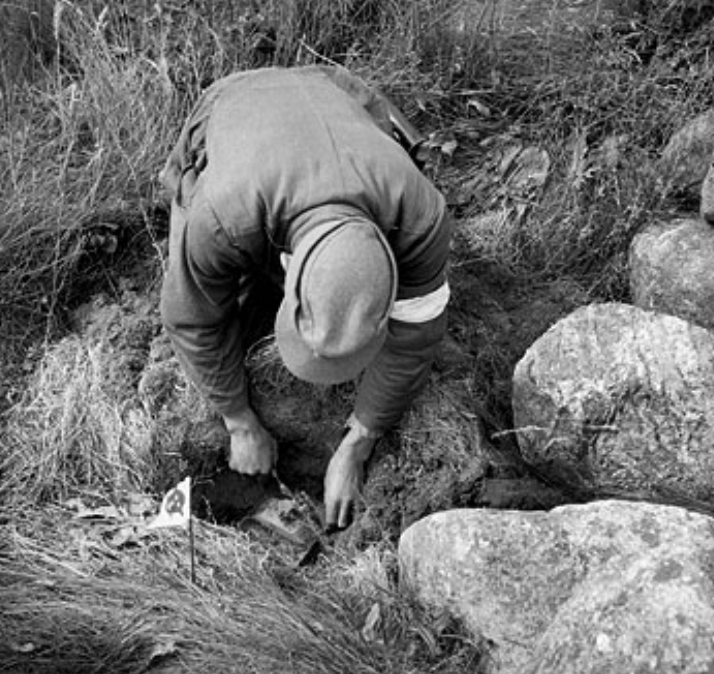
German soldier clearing a mine near Stavanger, August 1945

Even before the war ended, there was debate among Norwegians about the fate of traitors and collaborators. A few favored a "night of long knives" with extrajudicial killings of known offenders. However, cooler minds prevailed, and much effort was put into assuring due process trials of accused traitors. In the end, 37 people were executed by Norwegian authorities: 25 Norwegians on the grounds of treason, and 12 Germans on the grounds of crimes against humanity. 28,750 were arrested, though most were released for lack of evidence. In the end, 20,000 Norwegians and a smaller number of Germans were given prison sentences. 77 Norwegians and 18 Germans received life sentences. A number of people were sentenced to pay heavy fines.

The trials have been subject to some criticism in later years. It has been pointed out that sentences became more lenient with the passage of time, and that many of the charges were based on the unconstitutional and illegal retroactive application of laws.

=== German prisoners of war ===
After the war the Norwegian government forced German prisoners of war to clear minefields. When the clearing ended in September 1946, 392 of them had been injured and 275 had been killed. Meanwhile, only two Norwegians and four British mine-clearers had sustained any injuries. Many of the Germans were killed through their guards' habit of chasing them criss-cross over a cleared field to ensure that no mines remained.

=== Legacy of the occupation ===
By the end of the war, German occupation had reduced Norway's GDP by 45% – more than any other occupied country. In addition to this came the physical and patrimonial ravages of the war itself. In Finnmark, these were considerably important, as large areas were destroyed as a result of the scorched earth policy that the Germans had pursued during their retreat. Moreover, many towns and settlements were damaged or destroyed by bombing and fighting.

==== Social and cultural transformation ====
The adversity created as a result of the occupation strengthened and further defined the Norwegian national identity. The history of the resistance movement may have been glorified excessively, but it has also provided Norwegian military and political leaders with durable role models. The shared hardship of the war years also set the stage for social welfare policies of the post-war Norwegian Labour Party governments. It also led to the abandonment of Norway's traditional policy of neutrality, formalized when Norway became a founding member of NATO in 1949. Finally, it led to a broad political and popular commitment to maintain armed forces large enough to realistically defend the country against any likely threat, as well as to keep those armed forces under firm civilian control.

==== Surviving Luftwaffe aircraft ====
The primary Luftwaffe day fighter unit in Norway, Jagdgeschwader 5 (5th Fighter Wing), was the unit that used more of the surviving Second World War German fighter aircraft than any other in the forces of the Axis powers during the Second World War. The complement of surviving German fighter aircraft that once served with JG 5 comprises some twenty examples of the Messerschmitt Bf 109, and several examples of the radial-engined versions of the Focke-Wulf Fw 190. A small number of JG 5's surviving aircraft have been recently restored to flying condition by various organizations that fly them in airshow events, and a few others that served with JG 5 are also being restored to flying condition, early in the 21st century.

The lone surviving original example of the Arado Ar 234 Blitz turbojet-powered reconnaissance bomber, restored and on display in the Smithsonian Institution's Udvar-Hazy Center, in 1945 was based in Norway with Kampfgeschwader 76 (76th Bomber Wing) and brought to the United States through the efforts of Operation Lusty, on the deck of HMS Reaper escort carrier.

== See also ==
- Reichskommissariat Norwegen
- Nordstern (city)
