= Kitty Grande =

Norwegian Nazi collaborator

Kitty Margarete Grande (née Sørensen, later Lorange. 22 March 1919 – 26 January 1999) was a Gestapo agent in Trondheim, Norway during World War II. She was a member of the group Sonderabteilung Lola, led by Henry Rinnan. She was married to fellow Gestapo agent Ivar Grande, who was assassinated by the resistance movement in December 1944. During the legal purge after the war, Kitty Grande was sentenced to 20 years in prison with hard labour. She was released from prison on 26 May 1951.
