= Ivar Grande =

Norwegian Nazi collaborator

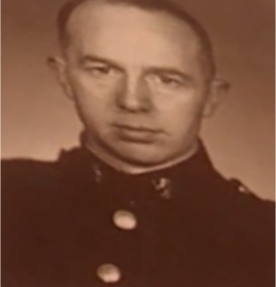
Family photo of Ivar Grande

Ivar Grande (28 April 1911 – 11 December 1944) was a police officer and Gestapo agent in Trondheim, Norway during World War II. He was second-in-command of the group Sonderabteilung Lola, led by Henry Rinnan. Grande was responsible for the unveiling of several resistance groups, by infiltration of the groups. He escaped several assassination attempts by the resistance movement, but was eventually shot and killed in Ålesund on 11 December 1944, by local Milorg members.

He was married to Kitty Grande, another member of Sonderabteilung Lola.
