= Aufklärungsabteilung =

Battalion-sized reconnaissance unit

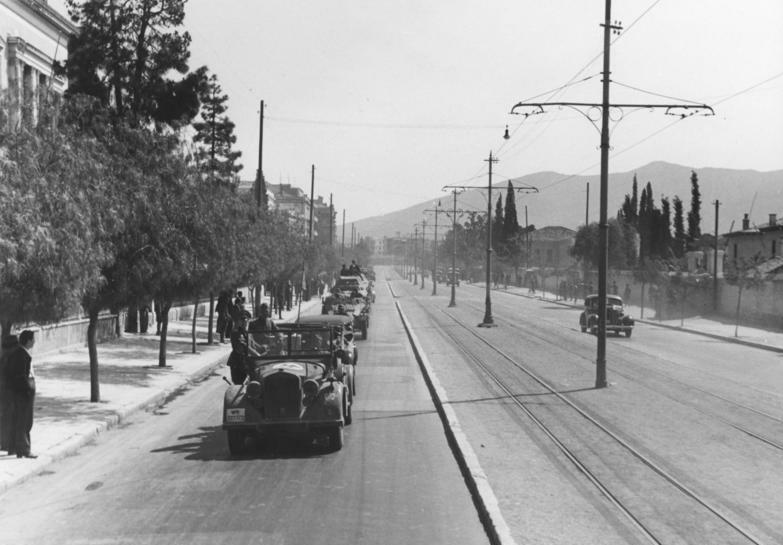
Entry of the Aufklärungsabteilung of the 5th Panzer Division into Athens, 1941

An Aufklärungsabteilung ("reconnaissance detachment") was an Abteilung (battalion)-sized reconnaissance unit attached to a German division during the Second World War.

The Aufklärungsabteilung was the eyes and ears of the parent division. During the first campaigns of the Second World War they included horse-mounted and bicycle troops in the infantry divisions; in the more mobile motorized infantry and Panzer divisions they were equipped with motorcycle combinations (e.g., BMW R75, Zündapp KS 750), Volkswagen Kübelwagens, and Sd.Kfz. 221/222/223 light armored cars.

Units in the mobile divisions were also equipped with six- and eight-wheeled heavy armored cars such as the Sd.Kfz. 231/232 and the Sd.Kfz. 234. Later in the war they were issued with Volkswagen Schwimmwagens, light half-tracks such as the Sd.Kfz. 250, as well as Panzer II Ausf. L "Luchs" and Aufklärungspanzer 38 light tanks. These rarely operated as whole companies, and instead worked in mixed teams gathered from various companies that included the motorcycles and the Schwimmwagens.

As with all German combat formations, the composition of the Aufklärungsabteilung varied from division to division, and from one period of the war to another. Panzer Aufklärungsabteilungen were attached to Panzer divisions, and were generally equipped with armoured vehicles, with all troops transported in half-tracks.

The Abteilung had to be able to move quickly, and as its mission was reconnaissance, it was not intended to engage enemy medium or heavy tanks, although these engagements did happen quite frequently. The addition of an anti-tank gun (PaK) company later in the war was an attempt to deal with these opponents; however, the unit's armoured vehicles were no match for T-34s or M4 Shermans.

The composition of two example Aufklärungsabteilungen were as follows:

== Example orders of battle ==
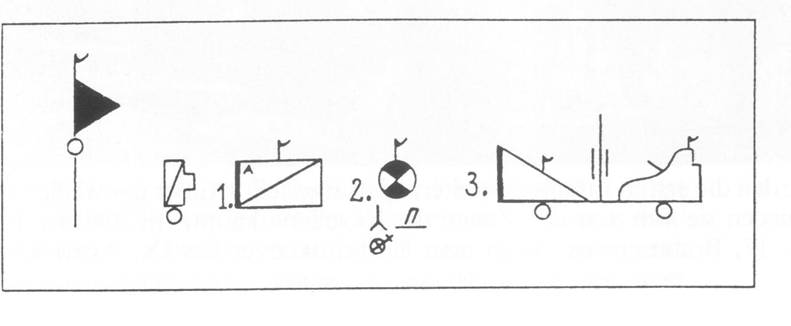
Battle structure of a partially motorized Aufklärungsabteilung of the Wehrmacht in 1939. Tactical symbols depict important weapons: departmental staff mounted and motorized, communications platoon partially motorized, 1. Cavalry squadron mounted; 2. Cyclist squadron on bicycles with heavy train; 3. Heavy squadron with anti-tank platoon, cavalry gun platoon, armored scout troop.

SS-Aufklärungs-Abteilung 1 (Attached to Infanterie-Regiment (mot.) Leibstandarte SS Adolf Hitler), Mid-1941

- Stab/SS-AufkAbt. 1 Headquarters Unit
- 1./SS-AufkAbt. 1 Heavy Armoured Car Company (Sd.Kfz. 222 / 231)
- 2./SS-AufkAbt. 1 Motorised Recon Company (Motorcycle / Car / Truck mounted infantry)
- 3./SS-AufkAbt. 1 Motorised Recon company (Motorcycle / Car / Truck mounted infantry)

Panzer Aufklärungsabteilung-2 (Attached to 2. Panzer-Division) Late 1944

- Stab AufkAbt. 2 Headquarters Unit
- 1./AufkAbt. 2 (first company) Heavy Armoured Car Company (no infantry, armoured cars only)
- 2./AufkAbt. 2 Light Armoured Car Company (no infantry, armoured cars only)
- 3./AufkAbt. 2 Light Armoured Half-Track Company (Sd.Kfz. 250) (infantry in half-tracks only)
- 4./AufkAbt. 2 Light Armoured Half-Track Company (Sd.Kfz. 250) (infantry in half-tracks only)
- 5./AufkAbt. 2 Heavy (support) Company (Sd.Kfz. 251) This company had infantry guns, Pak 40s etc.
- Supply Company

== See also ==
- Abteilung
- Armored fighting vehicle
- Military unit
- Sonderabteilung
