= Rinnan (surname) =

The surname Rinnan may refer to:

- Henry Rinnan (1915–1947), Norwegian Gestapo agent
- Arne Rinnan (born 1940), Norwegian sailor involved in the Tampa affair
- Frode Rinnan (1905–1997), Norwegian architect and politician
