= Sonderabteilung =

WWII German military formation

Sonderabteilung (English: Special Unit) is a German word often used to refer to some special German military formations during World War II. This term was similar to a detachment or battalion.

Several of the formations were created as penal military units composed of disgraced SS troops and criminals convicted of petty crimes.

== List of Sonderabteilungen (incomplete) ==
- Sonderabteilung Altreich
- Sonderabteilung Hela
- Sonderabteilung Lola
- Sonderabteilung Nachlässe
- Sonderabteilung Reinhardt
- Sonderabteilung Stralsund
- Sonderabteilung U

== See also ==
- 36th Waffen Grenadier Division of the SS
- 500th SS Parachute Battalion
- 999th Light Afrika Division (Germany)
