= Henry Rinnan =

Norwegian Gestapo agent (1915–1947)

Henry Oliver Rinnan
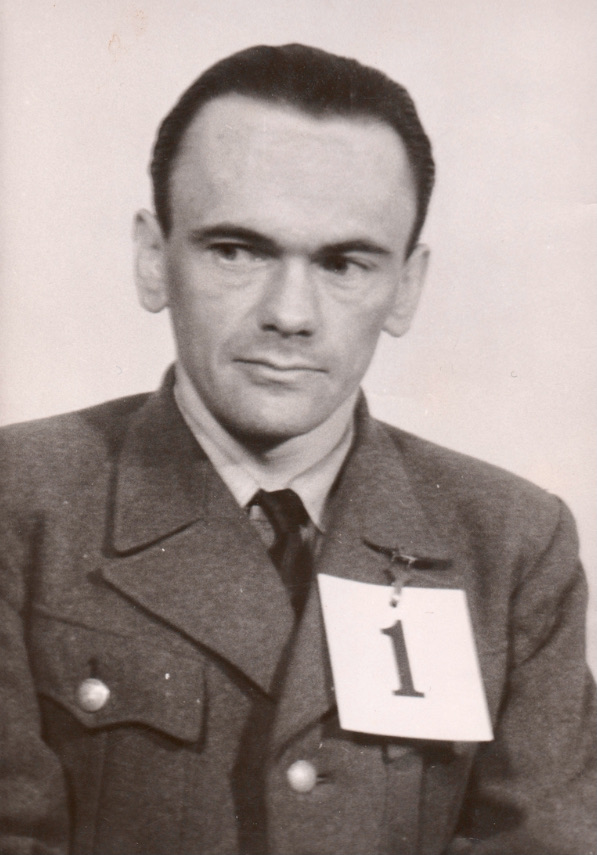
- Rinnan's trial photo
- Born: 14 May 1915; Levanger, Norway
- Died: 1 February 1947 (aged 31); Kristiansten Fortress, Norway
- Status: Executed by firing squad
- Conviction: Treason
- Penalty: Death
- Military career
- Allegiance: Nazi Germany
- Service years: 1940–1945
- Rank: Untersturmführer/Gestapo agent
- Units: Gestapo 1940–1945
- Conflicts: World War II

Henry Oliver Rinnan (14 May 1915 – 1 February 1947) was a Norwegian Gestapo agent. Rinnan led a group called Sonderabteilung Lola in the area around Trondheim Municipality, Norway, during World War II. This group, known as Rinnanbanden among Norwegians, had fifty known members, including Ivar and Kitty Grande.

== Biography ==
Born in Levanger on 14 May 1915, Rinnan was the eldest of eight children in an impoverished family. Standing at 1.61 metres (5 ft 3 in), he was unusually short for a Norwegian man. He was a loner during his childhood. He worked briefly for his uncle, but was sacked for theft.

During the Winter War, Rinnan tried to enlist with the Finns to fight against the Soviet Union, but was rejected due to his poor physique. During the Norwegian Campaign in 1940, he drove a truck for the Norwegian Army. According to Rinnan, he was recruited by the Gestapo in June 1940. His parents were members of Nasjonal Samling, but it is uncertain if he ever was a member. After the war, former members of Nasjonal Samling attempted to disassociate themselves from the group, which was seen as a pro-German unit.

Beginning in September 1943, the Rinnanbanden had its headquarters in Jonsvannsveien 46 in Trondheim, known as Bandeklosteret ("gang monastery"). Rinnan worked closely with the German Sicherheitspolizei in Trondheim, where his main contacts were Gerhard Flesch and Walter Gemmecke. During this decade the private residence of the Rinnan family was in the captured house of Landstads Vei 1, located approximately one kilometre from the gang's headquarters.

The members of the independent Gestapo unit Sonderabteilung Lola infiltrated the resistance movement by engaging people in conversation in buses, trains, cafés, etc., encouraging them to talk about their attitudes toward the Nazi occupation. Having identified people who they thought were in the resistance, Rinnan's agents worked to build trust with them and penetrate their networks. The Rinnan gang was responsible for the death of at least a hundred people in the Norwegian resistance and the British Special Operations Executive, for torturing hundreds of prisoners, for more than a thousand arrests, for compromising several hundred resistance groups, and in some cases, for deceiving people into carrying out missions for the Germans. Rinnan operated with impunity and almost no interference from his German taskmasters, often using murder and torture as sanctioned means.

During the war Rinnan was appointed SS-Untersturmführer der Reserve, and received the Iron Cross 2nd grade in 1944.

After Germany's capitulation in May 1945, Rinnan and a band of followers tried to escape into Sweden, but were caught. On 24 December he escaped from prison again and gathered some followers, but they were again apprehended after a few days.

In the course of two trials after the war, forty-one members of the Rinnan group were convicted and sentenced. Twelve received sentences of execution by firing squad from the Frostating Court of Appeal on 20 September 1946. Ten of those death sentences were carried out. Eleven other defendants were sentenced to lifelong forced labour (later pardoned), while the rest were given long prison sentences.

Rinnan photographed with visible bruises after his initial arrest

Henry Rinnan testifying at his trial

Rinnan was sentenced for personally murdering thirteen people, but the real number may be higher. Four hours after midnight on 1 February 1947, Rinnan was taken from his cell in Kristiansten Fortress. A guard blindfolded him and led him outside, where he was tied to a pole. He showed no emotion. At 04:05, Rinnan was executed by firing squad. He was cremated, and later unofficially buried at the Levanger Cemetery in an unmarked grave.

Forty percent of the people executed as a result of Norwegian war crimes trials after the Second World War were connected to Sonderabteilung Lola.
