= Sonderabteilung Lola =

Sonderabteilung Lola (Rinnanbanden)
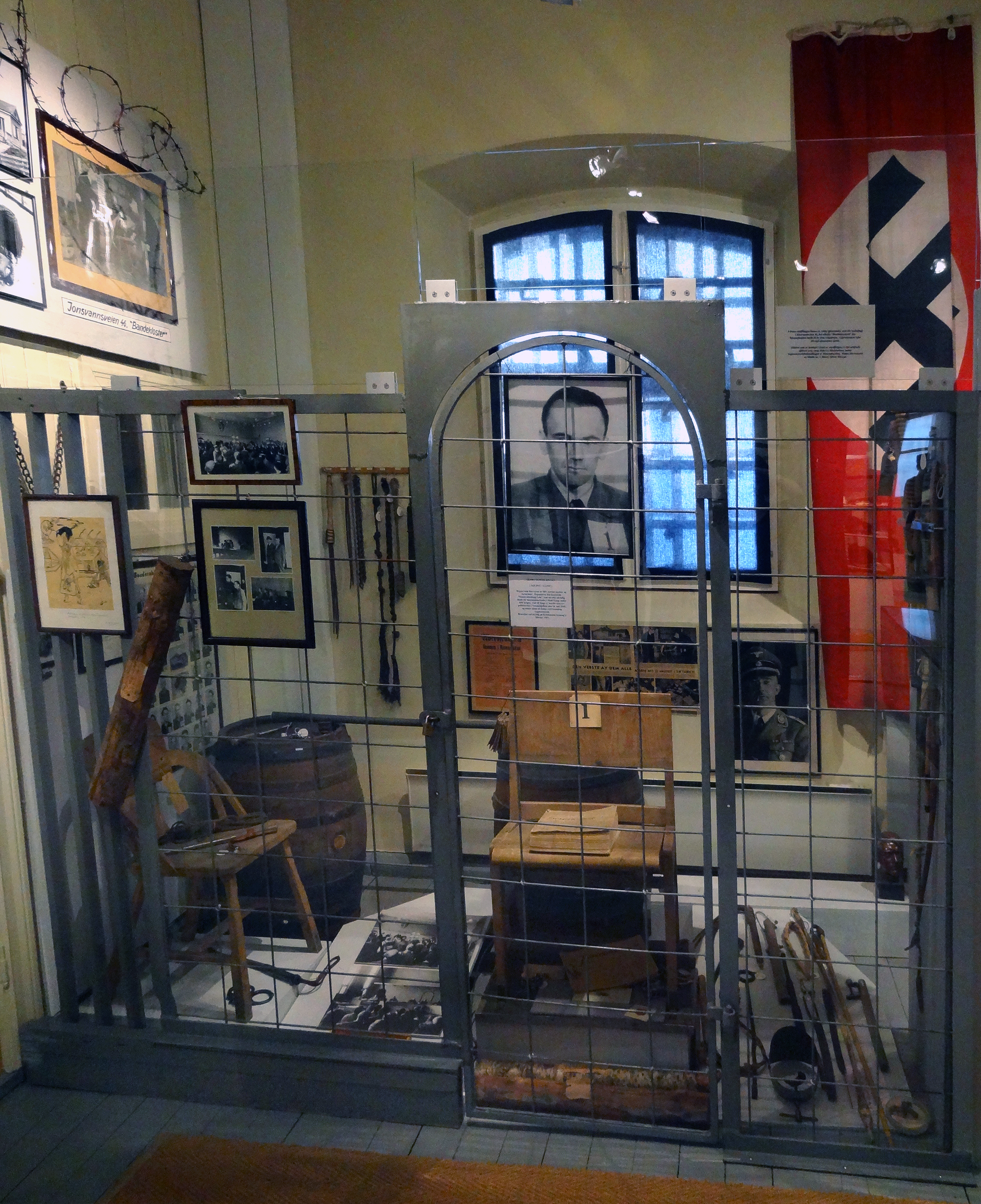
- From the museum's exhibition at Norsk Rettsmuseum, Trondheim of WW2, showing seized material from the torture center Bande-Klosteret
- Active: 1940–1945
- Country: Norway
- Allegiance: Nazi Germany
- Type: Sonderabteilung working for the German Sicherheitsdienst
- Role: Infiltration of the Norwegian resistance movement, that led to illegal arrests, torture and murder
- Size: 50–60 women and men
- Nicknames: Rinnanbanden, Rinnan gang

Commanders
- Notable commanders: Henry Rinnan

Sonderabteilung Lola (generally referred to in Norway as Rinnanbanden (the Rinnan gang)) was an independent group under the German Sicherheitsdienst in Trondheim, KDS Drontheim Referat IV. The Sonderabteilung ("Special Unit") consisted of around 50-60 Norwegian informants who worked for Henry Rinnan, many of whom were former Waffen-SS frontline soldiers. The group was not known to the vast majority of Norwegians, including the members of the Nasjonal Samling party, until after the war.

Under cover the group contacted people who were anti-Nazi, through whom they infiltrated the Norwegian resistance movement. After a period of active work in the resistance group, both to gather information and build trust, the network was rolled up and the participants arrested and interrogated. These kinds of infiltration operations were called "provocation business", to expedite action and subsequently arrest the suspects. Rinnan even called this a "game in the negative sector". The group worked all across Central Norway, i.e. Trøndelag, Møre og Romsdal, even Nordland. Rinnan wanted to expand operations to Oslo, but this was stopped, possibly by the Germans.

The group, which after the war was called the Rinnan gang, was not formally a part of the Sicherheitsdienst until 1943 when Rinnan received a formal position within the occupation. He used these powers to enable interrogation by harsher means. Before this, he had reported resistance people to contact the German officers Gerhard Flesch and Walter Gemmecke, so that they were arrested, tortured and possibly killed, or put in concentration camps.

Rinnan himself used a variety of aliases.

From September 1943 the group had a base at Jonsvannsveien 46 in Trondheim, known after the war as Bande-Klosteret (gang cloister), which was equipped with cells and torture chambers in the basement, where several people were tortured to death. Rinnan ran the group completely by its own rules and on a couple of occasions killed Norwegians without prior German consent. He even executed members of his own group if he believed they were acting suspiciously. Several hundred Norwegians were tortured, and it is believed that the group killed more than 80 people. In spring 1945 part of the group tried to flee to Sweden with hostages, but was stopped and arrested five kilometres from the border.

A legal purge against the group unfolded during 1945 and 1946, and resulted in seven life sentences and 12 death sentences, of which two were later converted to life sentences. Ten men were executed (Rinnan, Bjarne Jenshus, Aksel Mære, Harry Rønning, Harry Hofstad, Olaus Hamrun, Per Bergeen, Kristian Randal, Harald Grøtte and Hans Egeberg). Many female members were sentenced to prison terms of up to life imprisonment.

The Rinnan gang's former base at Jonsvannsveien 46 is as of 2014 still standing and used as an otherwise normal residential house.
