= December 1961 =

Month of 1961

<<	December 1961					>>
Su	Mo	Tu	We	Th	Fr	Sa
					1	2
3	4	5	6	7	8	9
10	11	12	13	14	15	16
17	18	19	20	21	22	23
24	25	26	27	28	29	30
31

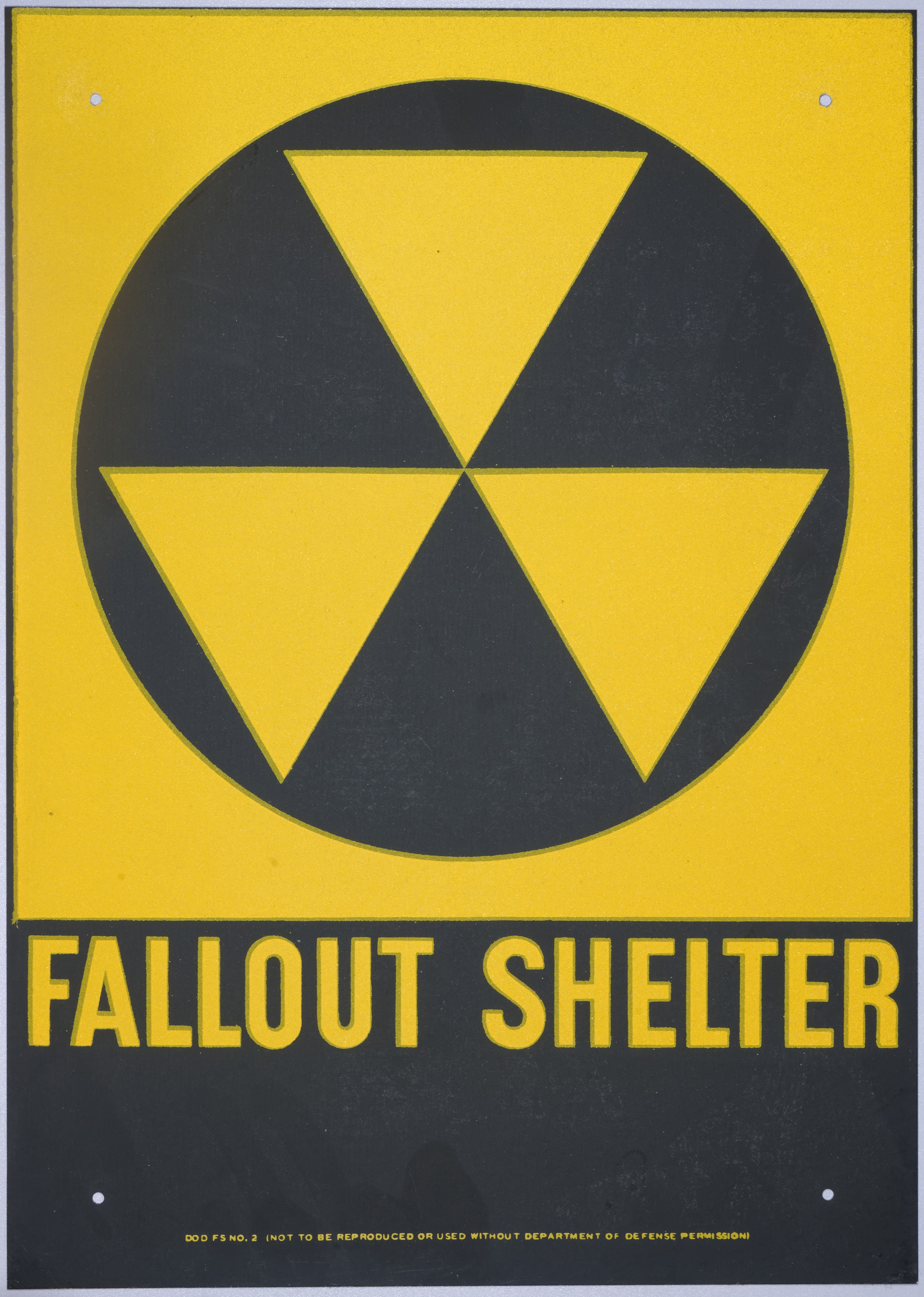
December 1, 1961: U.S. Department of Defense begins distribution of fallout shelter signs

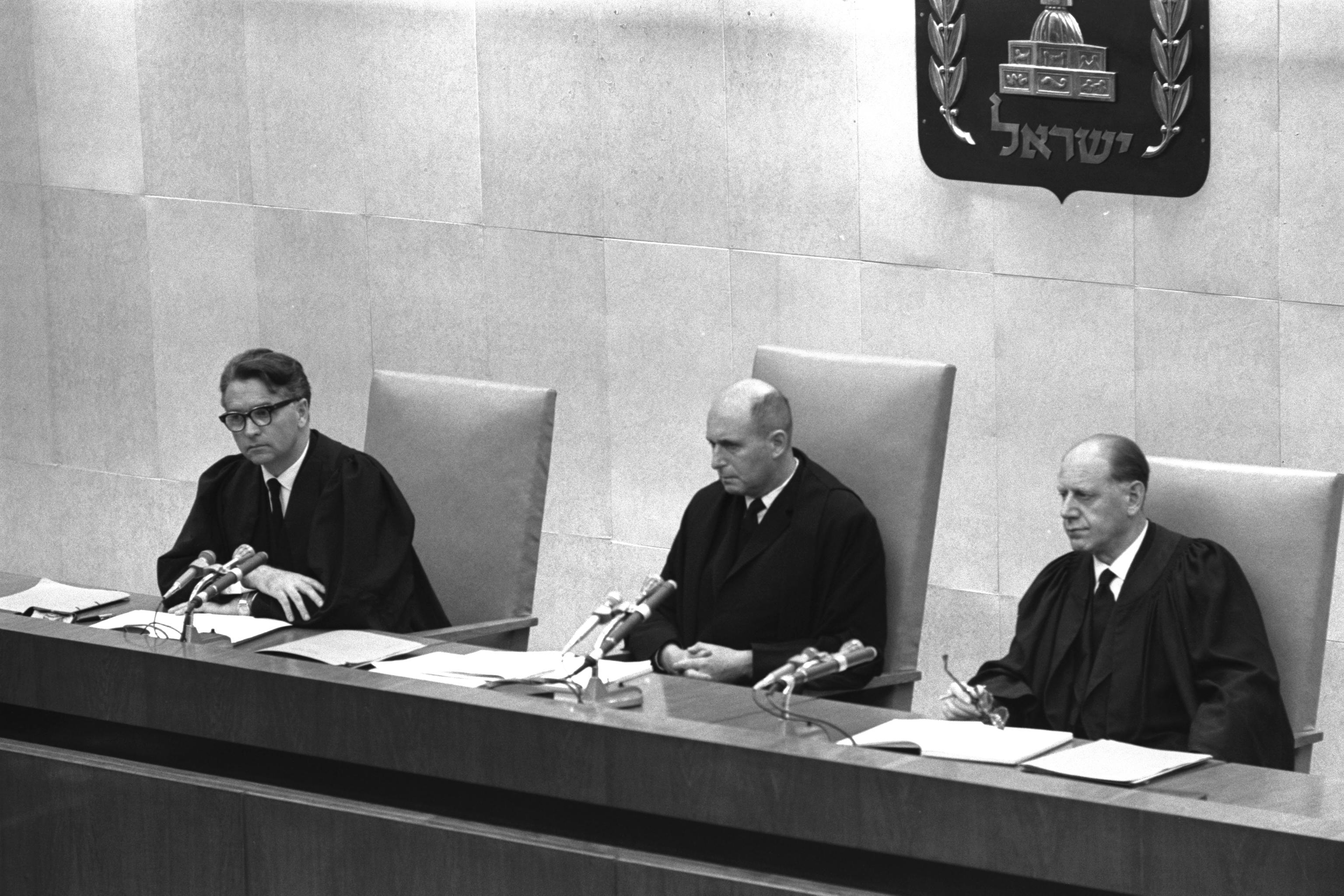
December 11, 1961: Three-judge panel in Israel announces guilty verdict in trial of former German general Adolf Eichmann

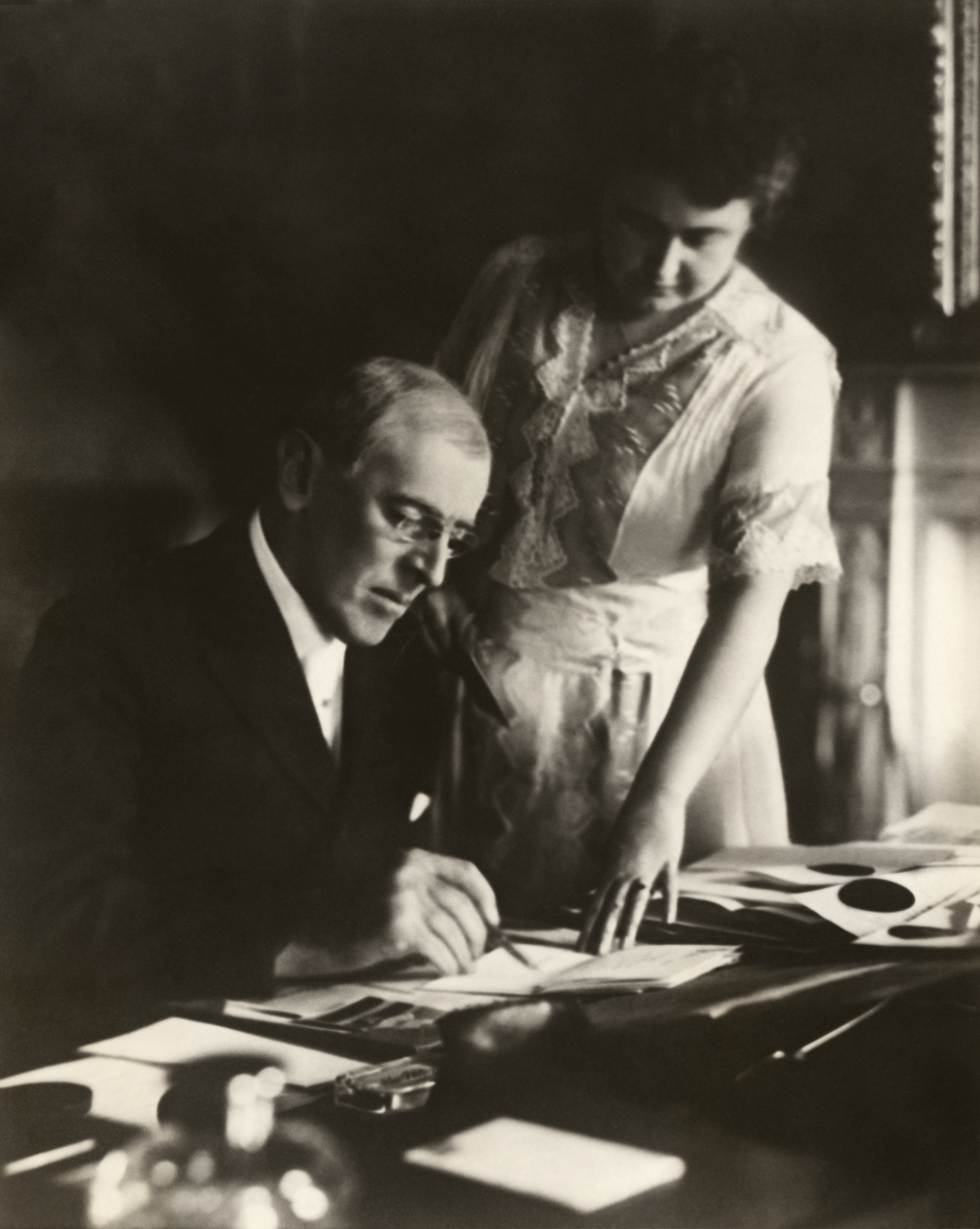
December 28, 1961: Edith Wilson, "The First Woman U.S. President", dies at 89

The following events occurred in December 1961:

== December 1, 1961 (Friday) ==
- The U.S. Department of Defense began the distribution of a unique black and yellow sign to mark each fallout shelter to be occupied in the event of a nuclear attack on the United States. According to a newspaper in Baltimore, Maryland, that day, an elementary school serving the families of U.S. Army personnel at Fort Holabird "became the first building in the country to be marked with the new black and yellow 'fallout shelter' sign." The signs would be a common sight during the Cold War until the early 1990s.

The Morning Star Flag

- The Dutch colony of Netherlands New Guinea raised the new Morning Star flag next to the Dutch tri-color and was made the autonomous territory of West Papua, with partial self-government as a UN Mandate. In 1963, however, the UN turned the mandate over to Indonesia, which annexed West Papua in 1969 after a sham plebiscite.
- The first elections held in Syria since its separation from the United Arab Republic brought the People's Party a plurality of the seats. The party's leaders, Nazim al-Kudsi and Maarouf al-Dawalibi, would respectively be named the President and Prime Minister by the new Parliament.
- Following the resignation of Tasmanian Liberal MHA for Bass, John Steer, to contest the Council seat of Cornwall, a recount resulted in the election of Liberal candidate Max Bushby.
- Israel announced plans to establish "the world's first chain of industrial co-operative towns" in the Negev Desert, starting with the community of Mitzpe Ramon.
- A coat of arms was officially granted to Hordaland.
- Born: Jeremy Northam, English actor; in Cambridge

== December 2, 1961 (Saturday) ==
- In a speech that began at midnight, Cuban revolutionary prime minister Fidel Castro declared "soy marxista-leninista y seré marxista-leninista hasta el último día de mi vida" ("I am a Marxist-Leninist and I will be a Marxist-Leninist until the last day of my life"). Castro confirmed that he would guide Cuba to becoming a Socialist state, and, in the long run, a Communist state, but added, "I'm saying this for any anti-communists left out there. There won't be any Communism for at least thirty years". However, he made clear that there would be only one political party, "The United Party of Cuba's Socialist Revolution", adding that "There is only one revolutionary movement, not two or three or four revolutionary movements."
- Dean Smith began his career as the North Carolina Tar Heels men's basketball head coach. He opened with an 80–46 victory over the visiting University of Virginia Cavaliers, the first of a record 879 wins as coach of one team. The record for most wins overall (903) was broken by Mike Krzyzewski on November 15, 2011, which included 83 wins as coach of Army before he became coach of Duke University.
- Actors Dinah Shore and George Montgomery announced that they would divorce after 18 years of marriage.
- Died: Laura Bullion, 88, American outlaw

== December 3, 1961 (Sunday) ==
- Workers at the Museum of Modern Art in New York City discovered that there had been a mistake in the museum's exhibit of "The Last Works of Henri Matisse". For 47 days, beginning on October 18, Le Bateau had been on display, hanging upside-down, and 116,000 visitors had passed it before Mrs. Genevieve Habert, a stockbroker, noticed the mistake. She confirmed the problem by referring to a catalogue of Matisse's works, then talked to various MOMA employees before she was taken seriously. The Museum rehung the painting, right-side up, the next day.
- Discoverer 35 fell out of orbit about three weeks after its launch.
- Born:
  - Marcelo Fromer, Brazilian guitarist; in São Paulo (died after being struck by a motorcycle, 2001)
  - Adal Ramones, Mexican TV presenter; in Monterrey

== December 4, 1961 (Monday) ==
- In Toronto, Floyd Patterson defeated challenger Tom McNeeley with a fourth-round knockout to retain the world heavyweight boxing championship. Tom's son, Peter McNeeley, would become Mike Tyson's first opponent upon the latter's release from prison in 1995. On the same evening, Sonny Liston knocked out Albert Westphal in a Philadelphia bout. It was the last bout for both Patterson and Liston, until they faced each other in 1962 in Chicago, with Liston taking the title from Patterson.
- In elections in Trinidad and Tobago, the People's National Movement, led by Prime Minister Eric Williams, captured 20 of the 30 seats in the Parliament, while the Democratic Labour Party won the others. The voting was split along ethnic lines, with the vast majority of Afro-Creole residents voting for the PNM, and those of East Indian descent voting for the DLP.
- The Alabama Crimson Tide was voted No. 1 in the final AP and UPI polls, granting them recognition the national college football champion. In the AP sportswriters poll, unbeaten (10–0) Alabama received 26 first place votes and 452 points overall. Ohio State (8–0–1) finished second with 20 first place votes and 436 points.
- The Armed Forces Expeditionary Medal was established by Executive Order of the U.S. President, for service in specified military operations during designated times. Retroactive awards were made for service in the Quemoy and Matsu Islands (since 1956), Lebanon (1958), the Taiwan Straits (1958) and in West Berlin since August.
- President Kennedy authorized the U.S. Department of Defense to commence of Operation Ranch Hand, the defoliation of the jungles of South Vietnam. The first run was on January 12, 1962, and the last in February 1971.
- An agreement on maintaining the neutrality of Laos was reached at the 14-nation Laos Peace Conference being held in Geneva.
- The Hundred of Hoo Railway in Kent, UK, ended passenger services.
- Born: Roy L. "Rocky" Dennis, American teenager who had craniodiaphyseal dysplasia, an extremely rare sclerotic bone disorder; in Glendora, California (died of sudden arrhythmic death syndrome, 1978)

== December 5, 1961 (Tuesday) ==
- The largest-ever escape from East Berlin to the West was carried out by Harry Deterling, a 28-year-old train engineer, after he and co-worker Hartmut Lichy learned that there was still an open rail connection at Albrechtshof, 0.25 miles (0.40 km) from the border, and that East German authorities were preparing to block it. Deterling's wife and four children, his mother, and 13 friends boarded at Oranienburg, and four others got on at Falkensee. Deterling and Lichy never stopped at the Albrechtshof station, and rushed the train past startled border guards. The train's conductor, and six passengers who had not been in on the plot, elected to return to East Germany. The government tore up the tracks the next day and put up barriers, and there were no further escapes by train.
- The Titan II GLV rocket, a modified Titan II missile, was recommended by deputies at NASA and by the U.S. Department of Defense for use in the Mercury Mark II (soon renamed Gemini) rendezvous program. Robert C. Seamans Jr. of NASA and John H. Rubel of the DoD had the choice of the Titan II, Titan II-1/2, or Titan III systems.
- U.S. President John F. Kennedy authorized American financial support to the Volta Dam project in Ghana, in order to prevent the West African nation from coming under the influence of the Soviet Union.
- Natalie Wood's imprint ceremony was held at Grauman’s Chinese Theatre.
- Died:
  - Emil "Judge" Fuchs, 83, owner of the Boston Braves baseball team (1923–1935), and the team's manager in the 1929 season
  - Finn Kjelstrup, 77, Norwegian traitor

== December 6, 1961 (Wednesday) ==
- NASA announced that the U.S. would not put an astronaut into orbit before the end of 1961, thus ending the possibility of matching the Soviets in the same calendar year. The Soviet Union had launched Yuri Gagarin into orbit eight months earlier, on April 12. While Alan Shepard of the U.S. was launched into space on May 5, followed by Gus Grissom on July 21, both were on suborbital missions. NASA noted that Lieutenant Colonel John Glenn, would not be launched into space until at least January 1962. Glenn would be sent into orbit on February 20.
- U.S. astronauts Alan Shepard (of the U.S. Navy) and Virgil Grissom (of the U.S. Air Force) were awarded the first Astronaut Wings by their respective services.
- The Dominican Republic awarded the Order of Trujillo for the last time.
- Born:
  - Jennifer San Marco, American spree killer; in Brooklyn (committed suicide, 2006)
  - Ally Fowler, Australian soap actress; in Adelaide, South Australia
- Died: Frantz Fanon, 36, Martiniquais psychiatrist and advocate of Algerian independence, died of leukemia.

== December 7, 1961 (Thursday) ==
- Robert R. Gilruth, Director of the Manned Spacecraft Center, announced the Mercury Mark II Project (soon to be renamed Gemini), the second phase of U.S. human spaceflight after the Mercury program. The Gemini missions would use two astronauts, in a modified version of the one-person Mercury capsule to be built by McDonnell Aircraft Corporation. Gilruth's procurement plan for $75,800,000 was approved for the initial phase of the program, with flights without a crew in 1963 and flights with two astronauts starting in 1965. The total cost for the equipment for the uncrewed and crewed missions — 12 capsules plus boosters and other equipment — was estimated at $500,000,000. On January 3, 1962, the Mercury Mark II program would be renamed to Project Gemini at the suggestion of Alex Nagy, after the constellation of the same name, associated with the "heavenly twins", Castor and Pollux. Gemini 1 would be launched on April 8, 1964, and Gemini 2 on January 19, 1965. The first Gemini astronauts, Gus Grissom and John Young, would be launched on Gemini 3 on March 23, 1965.
- NASA and the U.S. Department of Defense offered their joint recommendations to U.S. Secretary of Defense Robert S. McNamara on the division of effort between NASA and DOD in the Mercury Mark II program, with the U.S. Air Force's Space Systems Division to become NASA's contractor for developing, procuring, and launching the Titan II and Atlas-Agena rockets.
- Hungarian conductor Ferenc Fricsay gave his last concert, with the London Philharmonic Orchestra, then retired at the age of 47 due to illness. He would die of cancer 14 months later.

== December 8, 1961 (Friday) ==
- In a triple-overtime NBA game in Los Angeles, Wilt Chamberlain of the Philadelphia Warriors scored 78 points, breaking the record of 71 set by Elgin Baylor, as the two men faced each other. Baylor, playing for the Lakers, poured in 63 points. The two men had already combined for 100 points (53 for Chamberlain, 47 for Baylor) at the end of regulation with the score tied 109–109. Chamberlain's Warriors lost the contest, 151–147, and while his record carried with it an asterisk, he would score 100 points in a regular game on March 2.
- A flash fire killed 16 people on the ninth floor of the Hartford Hospital in Hartford, Connecticut. The blaze started in a trash chute and swept across the ceiling tiles, killing 7 patients, 5 visitors, and 4 hospital employees, including a physician. Investigators eventually concluded that the fire had resulted from the discarding of x-ray film into the chute, and ignition from a cigarette.
- Portugal's ambassador to the United Nations appealed for help from the UN Security Council, reporting that 30,000 troops from India were massing along the border of the Portuguese colony at Goa, and that seven ships from the Indian Navy were approaching Goa's coast.
- Errol Barrow replaced Hugh Gordon Cummins as Premier of Barbados.
- Born: Ann Coulter, American conservative commentator; in New York City
- Died:
  - Francesco Severi, 82, Italian mathematician
  - Séumas Robinson, 71, Irish republican

== December 9, 1961 (Saturday) ==
Tanganyika's colonial and national flags
- At the National Stadium in Dar es Salaam, the former British colony of Tanganyika gained independence, with Julius Nyerere as its first Prime Minister. Sir Richard Turnbull, who had been the British governor, served as the first and last Governor-general of Tanganyika until the nation became a Republic on the next Uhuru Day, one year later, with Nyerere as President. Prince Philip, the husband of Queen Elizabeth II, appeared on behalf of the United Kingdom. At midnight, the British territorial flag was slowly lowered as a record played God Save the Queen. The lights were then turned off, the new national anthem, Mungu Ibariki Tanganyika (God Bless Tanganyika) was played as the new flag was raised, and the lights were switched on again. In 1963, Tanganyika would merge with Zanzibar to become Tanzania.
- In the Australian national elections, the government of Robert Menzies was re-elected for the a sixth time. Although Menzies' Liberal Party eventually lost 15 seats and its coalition partner, the Country Party lost 2, the group was able to retain a razor thin majority of one, with 62 of the 122 seats in the Australian House of Representatives. The joint ticket won 30 of the 60 seats in the Senate of Australia. The Australian Labor Party (ALP), led by Arthur Calwell, gained 15 seats and had 60 of the 120 in the House.

== December 10, 1961 (Sunday) ==
- The Soviet–Albanian split was culminated when the Communist government of Albania confirmed that the Soviet Union had severed diplomatic relations on December 3, marking the first time that the USSR had ever withdrawn its embassy from another Communist state. Soviet leader Nikita Khrushchev had criticized Albanian leaders Enver Hoxha and Mehmet Shehu at the 22nd Soviet Communist Party Congress after the Albanians refused to repudiate Stalinism. The People's Republic of China then began a program of emergency aid to the Balkan nation.
- The Nobel Prizes were presented in Stockholm. Nobel laureates for 1961 were Melvin Calvin (chemistry), Georg von Békésy (medicine), Robert Hofstadter and Rudolf Mössbauer (physics), Ivo Andrić (literature) and the late Dag Hammarskjöld (peace). Albert Luthuli was awarded the 1960 Nobel Peace Prize, becoming the first African to receive the award. As with nine previous peace prize laureates, the selection was delayed by the Nobel Committee because of questions of whether any of the nominees met the criteria in Alfred Nobel's will.
- Operation Plowshare, the American experiment in using atomic weapons for peaceful purposes, began with Project Gnome, the underground explosion of a 3-kiloton atomic bomb near Carlsbad, New Mexico. Although the test device was placed 1,200 feet (370 m) below the surface in a cavern of rock salt, water within the salt was vaporized by the blast and sent a geyser of radioactive steam 300 above the surface.
- Born: Oded Schramm, Israeli mathematician; in Jerusalem (died in a mountaineering accident, 2008)

== December 11, 1961 (Monday) ==
- The Vietnam War officially began for the United States, as the USS Core arrived at Saigon Harbor. The ship brought in two helicopter units, the 8th Transportation Company from Fort Bragg and the 57th Transportation Company from Fort Lewis, with 33 H-21 Shawnee helicopters, and 400 U.S. Army personnel.
- After months of trial before a three-judge panel in Israel, Adolf Eichmann was found guilty of multiple crimes arising from the extermination of German and European Jews during the Holocaust. Judge Moshe Landau started his reading of the verdict with the words, "Accused, the court convicts you of crimes against the Jewish people, crimes against humanity, and membership in hostile organizations," then began reading the text of the judgment. Judge Landau was followed by Judges Benyamin Halevi and Itzhak Raveh. The reading of the entire verdict was not completed until the next day.
- Soviet writer Aleksandr Solzhenitsyn got his big break when he received a telegram from Aleksandr Tvardovsky, the editor of the magazine Novy Mir, announcing that his novel, with the working title of Щ-854, would be published in serial form. Tvardovsky renamed the book One Day in the Life of Ivan Denisovich.
- The first spacecraft emergency exiting exercises began for the Mercury astronauts at the Back River near Langley Field, with training for the astronauts and for helicopter recovery teams. In three days of training, the astronauts encountered no problems in using the top and side hatch exits from the spacecraft.
- In "Letter Contract NAS 9-170", NASA set its contract specifications with McDonnell Aircraft for the two-man Gemini spacecraft, with the five objectives of a spacecraft capable of orbital flights lasting up to 14 days, determining human ability to function in a weightless environment on extended missions, demonstrating rendezvous and docking with a target vehicle in Earth orbit, simplifying countdown procedures and techniques, and (5) making controlled landing on land (rather than at sea) the primary recovery mode.
- The 1961 Southeast Asian Peninsular Games opened in Rangoon.
- Born:
  - DJ Yella (stage name for Antoine Carraby), American DJ and rapper; in Los Angeles, California
  - Marco Pierre White, British chef and restaurateur; in Leeds, West Yorkshire

== December 12, 1961 (Tuesday) ==
- Police in Tokyo arrested 13 men in a pre-dawn raid after uncovering a plot to assassinate Prime Minister Hayato Ikeda and the 16 members of his cabinet. The plot, under the cover of the "Society for Japanese History", was financed by industrialist Toyosaku Kawanami with the assistance of former Lt. General Tokutaro Sakurai.
- The first of a series of satellites constructed by and for ham radio operators, OSCAR (Orbital Satellite Carrying Amateur Radio), was launched into orbit as part of the payload of Discoverer 36. By the end of the century, more than 50 OSCAR satellites had been launched.
- Testing demonstrated that the Mercury capsule could withstand pressure of up to 20 pounds per square inch (140 kPa) without defects.
- The South African cricket team won the first Test of their series against New Zealand, at Durban, by 30 runs.
- The production-standard prototype AESL Airtourer was brought out.
- Born:
  - Daniel O'Donnell, Irish singer; in Kincasslagh, County Donegal, Northern Ireland
  - Sarah Sutton, English actress on the show Doctor Who; in Basingstoke, Hampshire
- Died: Hauk Aabel, 92, Norwegian silent film star

== December 13, 1961 (Wednesday) ==
- In Geneva, the United States and the Soviet Union announced that they had come to an agreement on the formation of a multinational discussion to reduce nuclear weapons, in a group described as the "Eighteen-Nation Committee on Disarmament". The United Nations General Assembly endorsed the idea one week later, and the group first met on March 14, 1962. The 18 nations were the U.S., the UK, Italy, Canada and France; the USSR, Poland, Czechoslovakia, Bulgaria and Romania; and the non-aligned states of Mexico, Brazil, Ethiopia, Nigeria, Egypt, Sweden, India and Burma.
- The chairman of the Dutch cycling federation, Piet van Dijk, revealed his experiences of doping in the sport, stating that, in the 1960 Rome Olympics, "dope - whole cartloads - [was] used in royal quantities."
- Born: Maurice Smith, African-American kickboxer, World Kickboxing Association world heavyweight champion from 1983 to 1993, UFC heavyweight champion in 1997; in Seattle
- Died: Grandma Moses (Anna Robertson Moses), 101, American painter

== December 14, 1961 (Thursday) ==
- A bus accident killed 20 schoolchildren were killed and seriously injured 13 others near Greeley, Colorado, when their school bus was struck by a Union Pacific train. The crossing, located to the west of Evans, did not have flashing lights. The engineer for the train "City of Denver", which was inbound from Chicago at 80 miles per hour (130 km/h), told police that the driver, who had only minor injuries, did not stop at the crossing, while a student on the bus reported that the driver stopped at the crossing and opened the door. The 23-year-old driver, Duane Harms, was acquitted of manslaughter.
- The Presidential Commission on the Status of Women was created by Executive Order 10980 by U.S. President Kennedy, with former First Lady Eleanor Roosevelt as the honorary chairman. The Commission's report, American Women, was published in 1965 and described the unequal treatment faced by women in American society.
- Nazim al-Kudsi was elected unopposed by the 172-member National Assembly as President of Syria. Former Premier Khalid al-Azm withdrew his name from consideration prior to the voting.
- Tanganyika (the future Tanzania) was admitted to the United Nations.
- Water drop tests of the Mercury capsule began and concluded that the ablation heat shield could withstand re-entry without damage.
- Died:
  - John Joseph Bittner, 57, American geneticist and cancer researcher, died of a heart attack.
  - Richard Schirrmann, 87, German teacher and founder of the first youth hostel
  - Emil Sodersten, 62, Australian architect, died of a coronary occlusion.

== December 15, 1961 (Friday) ==
- The United Nations General Assembly declined to admit the People's Republic of China as member, by a vote of 36 in favor against 48 against, with 20 abstentions. On the same day, United Nations General Assembly Resolution 1668, declaring Communist Chinese membership an "important question", and requiring two-thirds approval rather than a simple majority for all future votes on admission, passed 61–34, with seven abstentions.
- Soviet KGB officer Anatoliy Golitsyn, who had memorized the details of secret documents and cases, defected to the West at the American CIA station office in Helsinki. Golitsyn has been described by one author as "perhaps the most controversial and divisive defector of the Cold War".
- The Israeli war crimes tribunal sentenced Adolf Eichmann to death for his part in the Holocaust. Chief Judge Landau delivered the decision in Hebrew at Eichmann's trial in Jerusalem.
- Pope John XXIII created 23 new memberships in the College of Cardinals, bringing the number to 75, and exceeding the maximum number of 70 that had been set in 1587 by Pope Sixtus V.
- The 1961 New York City Zoning Resolution was adopted, the first change to New York City's zoning code since the first Resolution was passed in 1915.
- The BBC presented the first episode in the long-running series, Comedy Playhouse.
- Born: Reginald Hudlin, African-American writer and film producer known for directing House Party, President of Black Entertainment Television from 2005 to 2008; in Centreville, Illinois
- Died: William "Dummy" Hoy, 99, American major league baseball player known for being the most accomplished deaf player in major league history; in 1888, he led the National League in stolen bases

== December 16, 1961 (Saturday) ==
- The African National Congress, frustrated with peaceful attempts to end apartheid in South Africa, began a bombing campaign with a new organization, Umkhonto we Sizwe, setting off explosions at empty government buildings in Johannesburg, Port Elizabeth and Durban. "Had we intended to attack life," Nelson Mandela would say in a statement at his trial in 1964, "we would have selected targets where people congregated, and not empty buildings and power stations." The Manifesto of Umkhonto, published the same day, began, "The time comes in the life of any nation when there remain only two choices— submit or fight. That time has now come to South Africa. We shall not submit and we have no choice but to hit back by all means in our power in defence of our people, our future, and our freedom." The only casualty was one of the saboteurs, Petrus Molefe, who died at the Dube township in Johannesburg, when the bomb he was placing exploded prematurely. There would be 190 attacks in all until the group was suppressed in 1963, and only one other death, when a young girl was killed by a bomb.
- The British medical journal The Lancet published a letter from Dr. W. G. McBride, an Australian obstetrician in the Sydney suburb of Hurstville, New South Wales, with the heading "Thalidomide and Congenital Abnormalities". The letter, which brought the link between thalidomide and birth defects to the world's attention, began "Sir- Congenital abnormalities are present in approximately 1.5% of babies. In recent months, I have observed that the incidence of multiple severe abnormalities in babies delivered of women who were given the drug thalidomide ("Distaval") during pregnancy, as an anti-emitic or as a sedative, to be almost 20%..."
- Isa bin Salman Al Khalifa was crowned Emir of Bahrain.
- Born:
  - Bill Hicks, American comedian; in Valdosta, Georgia (died of pancreatic cancer, 1994)
  - Salatyn Asgarova, Azerbaijani journalist; in Baku (killed by Armenian militants, 1991)
- Died: Hans Rebane, 78, Foreign Minister of Estonia from 1927 to 1928, died in exile in Sweden.

== December 17, 1961 (Sunday) ==
ZAPU Flag

- The Zimbabwe African People's Union (ZAPU) was founded by Robert Mugabe and Joshua Nkomo with the goal of eliminating white colonial rule in Southern Rhodesia (which would become, in 1965, Rhodesia and in 1979, Zimbabwe. The two would later become President and Vice-President of the Republic of Zimbabwe.
- A fire at a circus at Niterói, in the Rio de Janeiro State in Brazil, killed 323 people and injured hundreds of others. Most of the victims were children; many were burned or died of smoke inhalation, while others were trampled as the crowd (originally 2,500 people) attempted to escape. Towards the end of the second afternoon performance of the Gran Circus Norte-Americano, the circus tent had 2,500 spectators. At 3:45 p.m., as trapeze artists began their act, the nylon tent caught on fire and then fell upon the crowd and the wooden bleachers inside. Days later, Adilson Marcelino Alves, a disgruntled worker nicknamed "Dequinha", confessed to pouring gasoline on part of the tent with gasoline, with the help of Walter Rosa dos Santos ("Bigode") and José dos Santos ("Pardal"), in revenge for not being given free tickets to the circus after helping erect the tent. The three conspirators were sentenced to 16 years in prison.
- A legislative election held in El Salvador, for 54 deputies to that country's Constituent Assembly.

== December 18, 1961 (Monday) ==
- At 5:15 a.m., Operation Vijay was launched by the Army and Navy of India, as 30,000 troops invaded the Portuguese colonies at Goa, Damao and Diu. The colonies, founded in 1510 and collectively known as Portuguese India, comprised 1,537 square miles (3,980 km^{2}) and had a population of 650,000 people. By 5:00 in the afternoon, all but the capital had been taken. Major General Kenneth Candeth, who led the invasion by 30,000 troops, was named the new Governor of Goa. The Portuguese warship NRP Afonso de Albuquerque traded fire with the Indian Navy ship INS Betwa and was destroyed, with five of the crew killed. The Portuguese Governor-general, Manuel António Vassalo e Silva, declined to follow a cabled order from Portugal's Prime Minister António de Oliveira Salazar that prohibited surrender and closed with "Our soldiers or sailors must conquer or die."
- Addis Ababa University was established as Haile Selassie I University by the consolidation of several smaller colleges, with a total enrollment of 1,000 students. By the end of the century, there were over 19,000 students at the largest university in Ethiopia.
- CONCACAF (Confederation of North, Central American and Caribbean Association Football) was founded in Mexico City by the merger of the North American Football Confederation and the Confederacion Centroamericana y del Caribe de Futbol.
- The Scottish League Cup Final was replayed at Hampden Park. Rangers F.C. defeated Heart of Midlothian F.C., 3–1.

== December 19, 1961 (Tuesday) ==
- Indonesia's President Sukarno announced a military campaign that he called "Trikora" (Tri Komando Rakyat, or "Three Commands to the People"): (1) Take over the Netherlands' territory of West Papua and put an end to creation of a republic there; (2) Take over the Netherlands' territory of West Irian; and (3) Mobilize all of Indonesia's resources for those purposes.
- At 2:30 p.m., Portuguese India's Governor-General Vassalo e Silva signed an unconditional surrender in front of Indian Army Brigadier General K. S. Dhillon, bringing an end to 451 years of Portuguese rule of the colony. Goa, Daman and Diu, Dadra and Nagar Haveli were incorporated into India as a single Union Territory. In 1987, Goa would become the 25th State of India.
- French President De Gaulle signed legislation creating the Centre National d'Etudes Spatiales (CNES), France's civilian space agency.
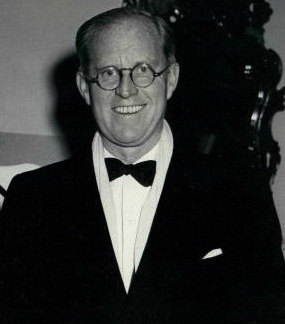
  Kennedy Sr.
- Joseph P. Kennedy Sr., former U.S. Ambassador to the United Kingdom, and the father of U.S. President John F. Kennedy and U.S. Attorney General Robert F. Kennedy, suffered a massive stroke after playing golf in Palm Beach, Florida. He never recovered his ability to speak, and outlived both John and Bobby, dying in 1969.
- The World Food Programme was created by the United Nations General Assembly Resolution 1714, adopted unanimously.
- Born:
  - Reggie White, African-American NFL defensive end and ordained Baptist minister, nicknamed "The Minister of Defense"; in Chattanooga, Tennessee (died of arrhythmia, 2004)
  - Eric Allin Cornell, American physicist and Nobel laureate; in Palo Alto, California
  - Matthew Waterhouse, English Doctor Who actor; in Hertford

== December 20, 1961 (Wednesday) ==
- Sir Geoffrey de Freitas resigned his seat in the UK House of Commons to become British High Commissioner in Ghana – the first Labour appointment to an important role in one of the newly independent former British colonies.
- UN General Assembly Resolution 1723 (XVI) was passed, declaring that the large-scale exodus of Tibetan people was linked to a violation of its human rights and the suppression of its culture and religion.
- The last legal execution on the island of Ireland took place as Robert McGladdery was executed for murder in Belfast, Northern Ireland.
- Born:
  - Mike Keneally, American session guitarist, keyboardist, vocalist and composer; in Long Island, New York
  - Freddie Spencer, American motorcycle racer; in Shreveport, Louisiana
  - Mohamed Fouad, Egyptian singer, actor and songwriter; in Cairo
  - Bonnie Marino, American model and actress; in Cleveland, Ohio

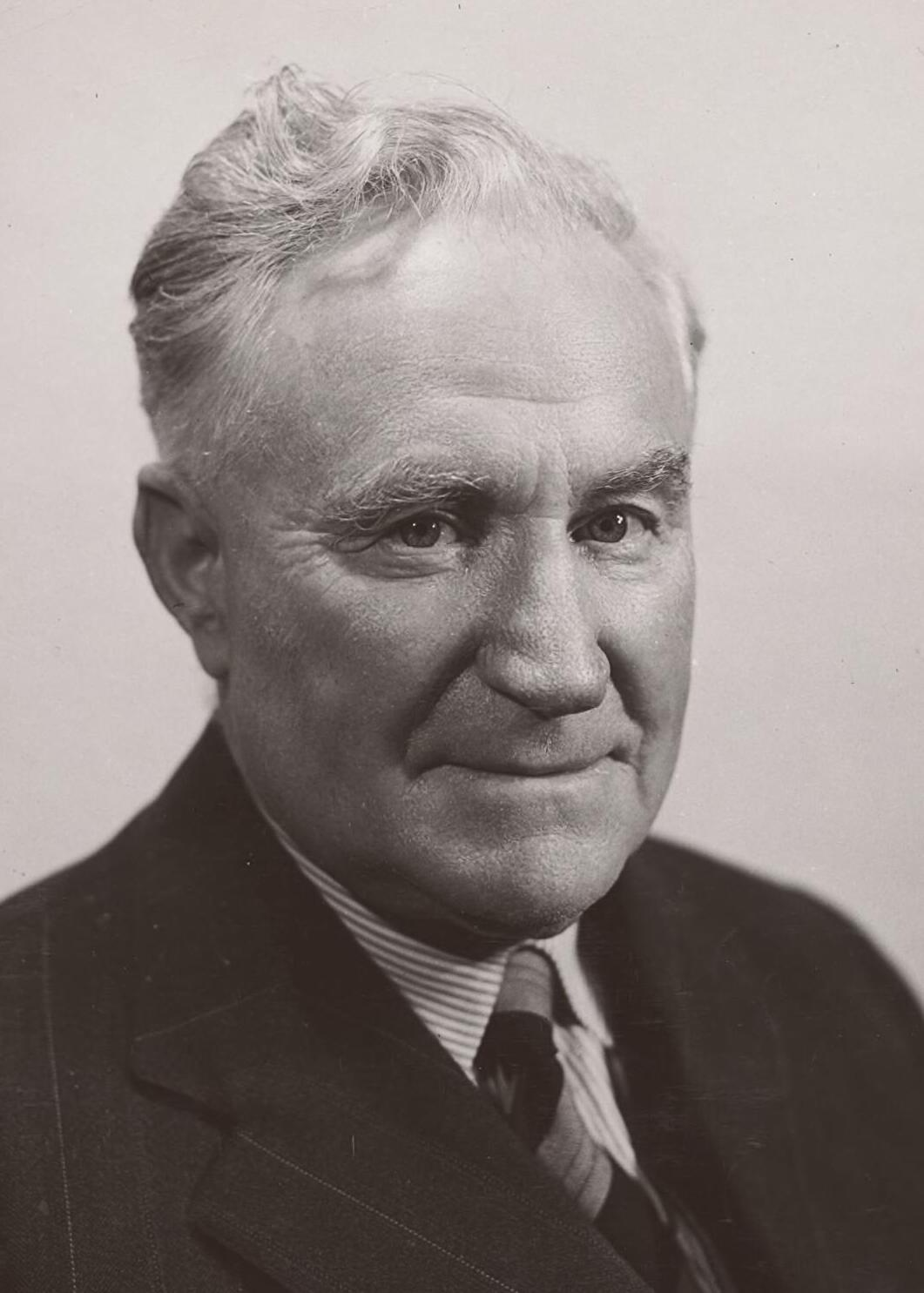
Prime Minister Page

- Died:
  - Earle Page, 81, who briefly served as Prime Minister of Australia in 1939, died 11 days after losing his parliamentary seat in the federal election.
  - Moss Hart, 57, American dramatist and director, died of a heart attack.

== December 21, 1961 (Thursday) ==
- At the U.N. military base at Kitona, in the Congo, Katangan President Moise Tshombe and Congolese Prime Minister Cyrille Adoula signed an 8-point agreement, bringing an end to Tshombe's attempt to create a separate nation out of the mineral-rich Congolese province.
- Died: Hinrich Wilhelm Kopf, 68, former Minister-President of Lower Saxony and third President of the German Bundesrat

== December 22, 1961 (Friday) ==
- U.S. Army Specialist 4 James T. Davis, of Livingston, Tennessee, became the first American combat fatality in the Vietnam War. Davis, aged 25, had been ordered to lead a South Vietnamese Army team near Cau Xang, 10 miles (16 km) west of Saigon. Davis was the lone American among ten soldiers killed in a Viet Cong ambush.
- France granted the Comoros Islands internal political autonomy.
- McDonnell Aircraft accepted NASA's Letter Contract NAS 9-170 specifications, to design and manufacture 12 spacecraft, 15 launch vehicle adapters, and 11 target vehicle docking adapters for Mercury Mark II, along with static test articles and all ancillary hardware necessary to support spacecraft operations. Major items to be furnished by the U.S. Government to McDonnell to be integrated into the spacecraft were the paraglider, launch vehicle and facilities, astronaut pressure suits and survival equipment, and orbiting target vehicle. The first spacecraft, with launch vehicle adapter, was to be ready for delivery by March, 1963, with each of the remaining 11 to follow at 60-day intervals, and initial Government obligation under the contract was $25 million.
- Born:
  - Yuri Malenchenko, Ukrainian cosmonaut with 827 days (two years, 97 days) in space on five Russian and one U.S. space mission; in Khrushchev, Ukrainian SSR, Soviet Union (now Svitlovodsk, Ukraine)
  - Andrew Fastow, American fraudster who was Chief Financial Officer for the Enron Corporation; in Washington, D.C.
- Died: Elia Dalla Costa, 89, Italian cardinal

== December 23, 1961 (Saturday) ==
- A railway accident killed 71 people in Italy, when a crowded railroad car, carrying Christmas shoppers, students and migrant workers heading home for the holiday, jumped a track near Catanzaro and plunged down a 100-foot (30 m) embankment and into the rain swollen Fiumarella River. The dead were from the villages of Cerrisi, Decollatura, and Soveria Mannelli. The engineer, Ciro Micelli, survived and was later sentenced to 10 years in prison for manslaughter after a court found that he had taken the curved railroad track at almost twice the speed limit.
- The capsizing of Roby Anita drowned 18 people when the motor launch boat capsized off of Mindanao Island in the Philippines. Another 63 were rescued.
- Luxembourg's National Day, the Grand Duke's Official Birthday, was set as June 23 by Grand Ducal decree.
- Born: Carol Smillie, Scottish TV personality; in Glasgow
- Died:
  - Kurt "Panzermeyer" Meyer, 51, German General and convicted war criminal who defended against the Normandy invasion during World War II, died of a heart attack.
  - Wolfgang Steinecke, 51, German musician who founded the Internationale Ferienkurse für Neue Musik in Darmstadt, was killed when he was struck by a car.

== December 24, 1961 (Sunday) ==
- Francisco Franco, the long-time dictator of Spain, was shot and wounded. Franco had been pigeon shooting at El Pardo when a shell casing from his gun exploded, injuring his left hand. While he recovered during the first few months of 1962, Franco delegated some of his powers to his Interior Minister, General Camilo Alonso Vega, and his Director General of Security, Carlos Arias Navarro.
- Radio Mecca reported a breakthrough in a move toward democracy in Saudi Arabia, with news that Prince Talal bin Abdul-Aziz Al Saud had submitted a proposed new Constitution to King Ibn Saud and his Council of Ministers. The draft, which would have created an elected legislature, was rejected, and three days later, Radio Mecca denied ever broadcasting the news.
- PERMIAS (PERsatuan Mahasiwa Indonesia di Amerika Serikat, or the Organization of Indonesian Students in the United States), was founded in Washington, D.C., the first and largest of several Indonesian-American groups in the U.S.
- At the town of Bugalagrande in western Colombia, a terrorist bomb killed 51 people who were participating in a religious procession on Christmas Eve. The blast went off in an army barracks as worshippers were passing through the town square.
- The Houston Oilers beat the home team San Diego Chargers, 10–3, to win the 1961 American Football League Championship Game.
- Born: Ilham Aliyev, President of Azerbaijan since 2003; in Baku, Azerbaijan SSR, Soviet Union

== December 25, 1961 (Monday) ==
- Pope John XXIII issued the papal bull Humanae salutis ("of human salvation") to summon the Second Vatican Council. The announcement surprised everyone, in that the Pope did not consult with advisers beforehand. "Vatican II" would open on October 11, 1962, with participation from Roman Catholic clergy and theologians worldwide.
- The Maxwell House Hotel, at one time the most luxurious hotel in Nashville, and the inspiration for Maxwell House coffee, was completely destroyed by a fire on Christmas night. Although eight U.S. Presidents had stayed at the inn over the years, it later became a residential hotel.
- The Soviet Passport office in Minsk notified Marina Oswald that she and her husband, Lee Harvey Oswald, would be granted exit visas so that they could travel to the United States.
- Born:
  - David Thompson, 6th Prime Minister of Barbados from 2008 to 2010; in London (died from pancreatic cancer, 2010)
  - Stefan Ruzowitzky, Austrian film director known for the 2007 film Die Fälscher (The Counterfeiters); in Vienna
  - Íngrid Betancourt, Colombian politician and anti-corruption activist; in Bogotá
  - Ghislaine Maxwell, British socialite and convicted child sex trafficker
- Died: Otto Loewi, 88, German pharmacologist and 1936 Nobel Prize laureate who discovered acetylcholine, the first identified neurotransmitter

== December 26, 1961 (Tuesday) ==
- The Kingdom of Yemen, which had joined Egypt and Syria in March 1958 to become part of the United Arab Republic, broke ties with the government of Egypt's Gamel Abdel Nasser. The Imam of Yemen had retained his throne while being linked with the UAR under the collective name "United Arab States".
- British driver Jim Clark won the 1961 South African Grand Prix.

== December 27, 1961 (Wednesday) ==
- The Empire State Building, at that time still the tallest skyscraper in the world, was sold to a group of investors headed by Lawrence A. Wien for $65,000,000. In what was described, at that time, as "the most complex transaction in real estate history", the closing, required the services of almost 100 professionals. It took place at the headquarters of the seller, the Prudential Insurance Company, in Newark, and the signing of the necessary documents took more than two hours.
- Four days after the Catanzaro train wreck that killed 71 people, a crowd of more than 3,000 people, most of them friends and relatives of the dead, attacked the privately owned Italian railroad line, tearing up the tracks and wrecking stations. Angry protesters set fire to the terminal at Soveria-Mannelli, and at Decollatura, the crowd tore down telephone poles.
- Anatoly Dobrynin was named as the new Soviet ambassador to the United States, replacing Mikhail A. Menshikov.
- Martin-Baltimore received a go-ahead from the U.S. Air Force to begin work on 15 Gemini launch vehicles, the day after NASA's Manned Spacecraft Center directed Air Force Space Systems Division to authorize contractors to begin the work necessary to use the Titan II in the Mercury Mark II program. On December 27,
- The Scout Association of Hong Kong held its Hong Kong Golden Jubilee Jamborette, celebrating the 50th anniversary of Scouting in Hong Kong.
- Born: Guido Westerwelle, Vice Chancellor of Germany from 2009 to 2011; in Bad Honnef (died of leukemia, 2016)
- Died: Hermann Foertsch, 66, German World War II general

== December 28, 1961 (Thursday) ==
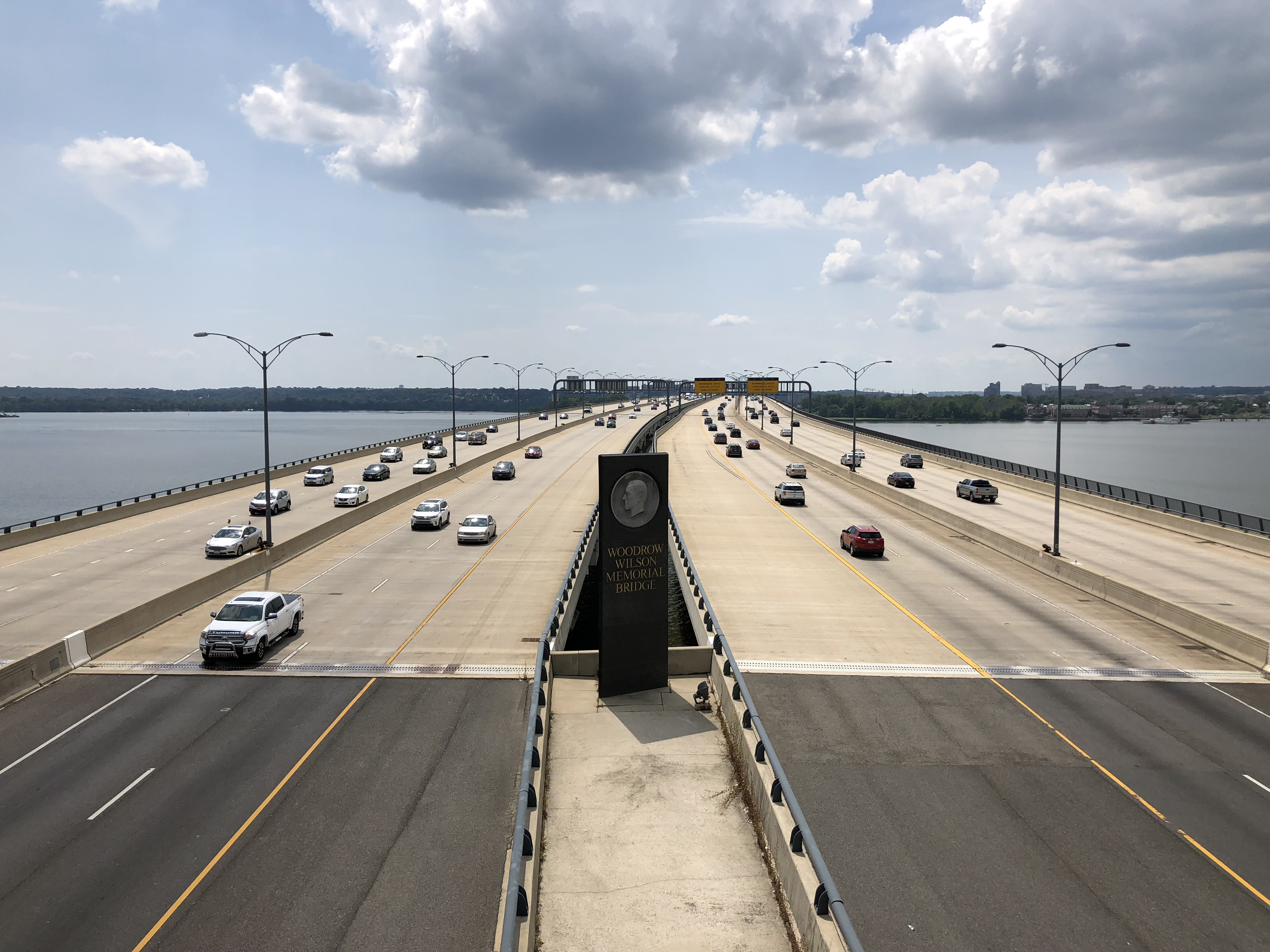
View of the bridge from the Maryland side in 2019

- The Woodrow Wilson Memorial Bridge opened to traffic for the first time, with the bridge being named after the 28th U.S. president. Edith Wilson was supposed to have been the guest of honor at the bridge's dedication ceremony in Washington, D.C., but died that very morning. In October 2000, construction on a new, more modern replacement consisting of two separate spans began. The downstream span of the new bridge opened in June 2006; the upstream span opening just 2 years later. The original 1961 bridge would be demolished in July 2006.
- The Defence Food Research Laboratory was established in Mysore, India.
- Canada's first BOMARC Missile squadron was formed.
- Born: Katina Schubert, German politician and leader of the leftist party Die Linke; in Heidelberg
- Died: Edith Wilson, 89, sometimes referred to as the "first woman president" of the United States after her husband, Woodrow Wilson, was disabled by a stroke. Mrs. Wilson's passing occurred on the 105th anniversary of her husband's birth.

== December 29, 1961 (Friday) ==
- France's President, Charles de Gaulle, delivered his annual New Year's address on national television and radio, and announced that in the coming year, his listeners "would see the end of French Algeria 'one way or another'" and that with the withdrawal of French Army forces from Africa, 1962 would be "the year the army will be regrouped in Europe". The declaration was a shock to most of the one million French residents of north Africa who had still hoped that their homes would not become part of an Arab Muslim nation; Algeria would be granted its independence seven months later, on July 5.
- Enver Nazar ogly Alikhanov became the Premier of the Azerbaijan SSR, at that time one of the constituent republics of the Soviet Union.
- NASA issued the Gemini Operational and Management Plan, outlining the division of responsibilities of between NASA and the Department of Defense on the Gemini program. The U.S. Department of Defense would be responsible for procurement and launch of the Titan II and Atlas rockets, as well as range and recovery support, while NASA would be responsible for overall program planning, direction, systems engineering, and operations, including launch, flight, recovery, command, tracking, and telemetry during orbital operations. NASA agreed to reciprocal support of Department of Defense space projects and programs within the scope of the Gemini program. A slightly revised version of the plan would be approved on March 27, 1962.
- Died: Anton Flettner, 76, German aviation engineer and inventor

== December 30, 1961 (Saturday) ==
- Congolese troops captured Albert Kalonji, who had declared the independence of the Congolese province of South Kasai, with himself as President, and later as the King. With South Kasai reconstituted into the Republic of Congo, Kalonji was imprisoned, but would escape on September 7, 1962, making a final, unsuccessful attempt, to set up a new government.
- More than 25 years after it had been written, the Fourth Symphony of Dmitri Shostakovich was first performed. The Moscow Philharmonic Orchestra, conducted by Kirill Kondrashin, played the symphony at the Great Hall of the Moscow Conservatory. The original score had been destroyed during World War II, but was reconstructed from sources discovered in 1960.
- Diosdado Macapagal was sworn into office as the new President of the Philippines.
- Born:
  - Ben Johnson, Jamaican-born Canadian Olympic athlete whose world records for the 100 meter dash would be annulled because of his steroid use; in Falmouth, Trelawny Parish
  - Douglas Coupland, Canadian novelist known for Generation X: Tales for an Accelerated Culture; at RCAF Station Baden–Soellingen in West Germany

== December 31, 1961 (Sunday) ==
- Ireland's first national television station, Telefís Éireann (later RTÉ), began broadcasting. A speech by Irish President Éamon de Valera opened the new era. Previously, the eastern area of the Republic of Ireland along with border counties with Northern Ireland was able to receive broadcasts from the BBC and ITV networks from Great Britain.
- The Green Bay Packers defeated the visiting New York Giants, 37–0, to win the 1961 NFL Championship Game.
- Died: Leo Lentelli, 82, Italian sculptor
