= Sophus Kahrs =

Norwegian traitor, officer in Nazi SS

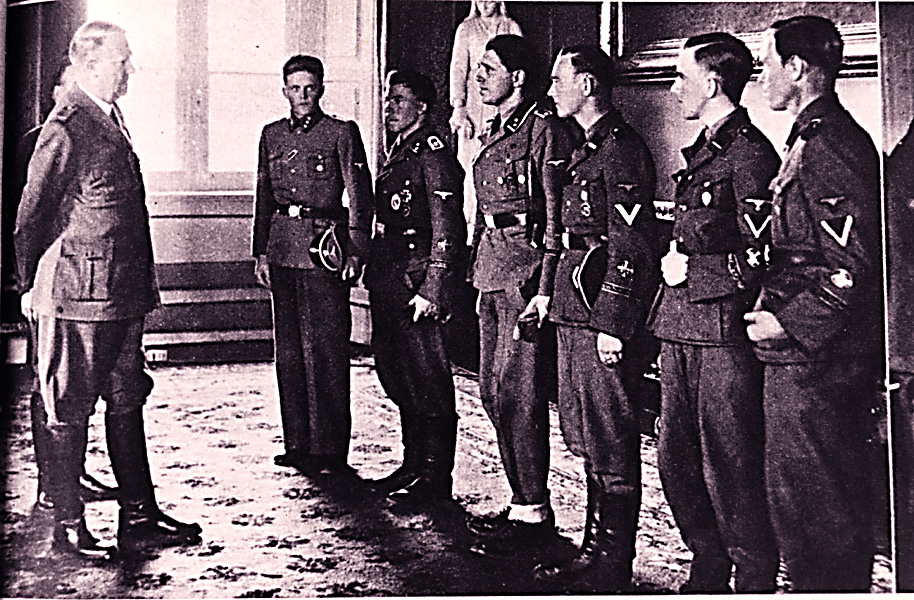
- Kahrs with Vidkun Quisling
- Born: 28 March 1918; Bergen, Norway
- Died: 18 November 1986 (aged 68); Buenos Aires, Argentina
- Conviction: Treason
- Penalty: 10 years imprisonment with hard labour
- SS career
- Allegiance: Nazi Germany
- Branch: Waffen SS
- Rank: Sturmbannführer
- Unit: Norwegian Legion
- Commands: SS Ski Jäger Battalion "Norwegen"

Sophus Magdalon Buck Kahrs (28 March 1918 – 18 November 1986) was a Norwegian commander in the German SS during the Nazi era. Following the war, he was convicted for treason.

== SS career ==
Kahrs was born in Bergen, Norway in 1918 into a family of German origins. He joined the Nasjonal Samling in 1934. And around the same time he also joined the party's paramilitary wing, the Hird, and from 1936 the NS Battle Organization. After the outbreak of World War II, he volunteered for service in the Norwegian Legion of the Waffen-SS. In the summer of 1944 made acting battalion commander of the SS Ski Jäger Battalion "Norwegen".

In 2013 Norwegian daily Dagbladet's then correspondent in Germany said that "The Norwegian company commander failed—and fled the combat zone, while many were killed or captured". Kahrs disappeared early in the battle—later reappearing uninjured in the rear echelons, where he in his own report put himself in a positive light; thus avoiding court martial. Later he was put in charge of Vidkun Quisling's bodyguard detail, known as the Førergarde.

== Criminal conviction ==
After the war, Kahrs was arrested and charged with treason. He was convicted and sentenced to 10 years of hard labour. He escaped on 3 July 1947, along with three other inmates, from Espeland concentration camp. They soon joined up with three other former SS members and sailed on the boat Solbris to Buenos Aires, Argentina. He was joined by his wife and son. He found work as an electrician, and later as a foreman at an American car company, until his death on 18 November 1986. His son returned to Bergen in 2005, a year later, he died.
