= Arthur Qvist =

Norwegian equestrian

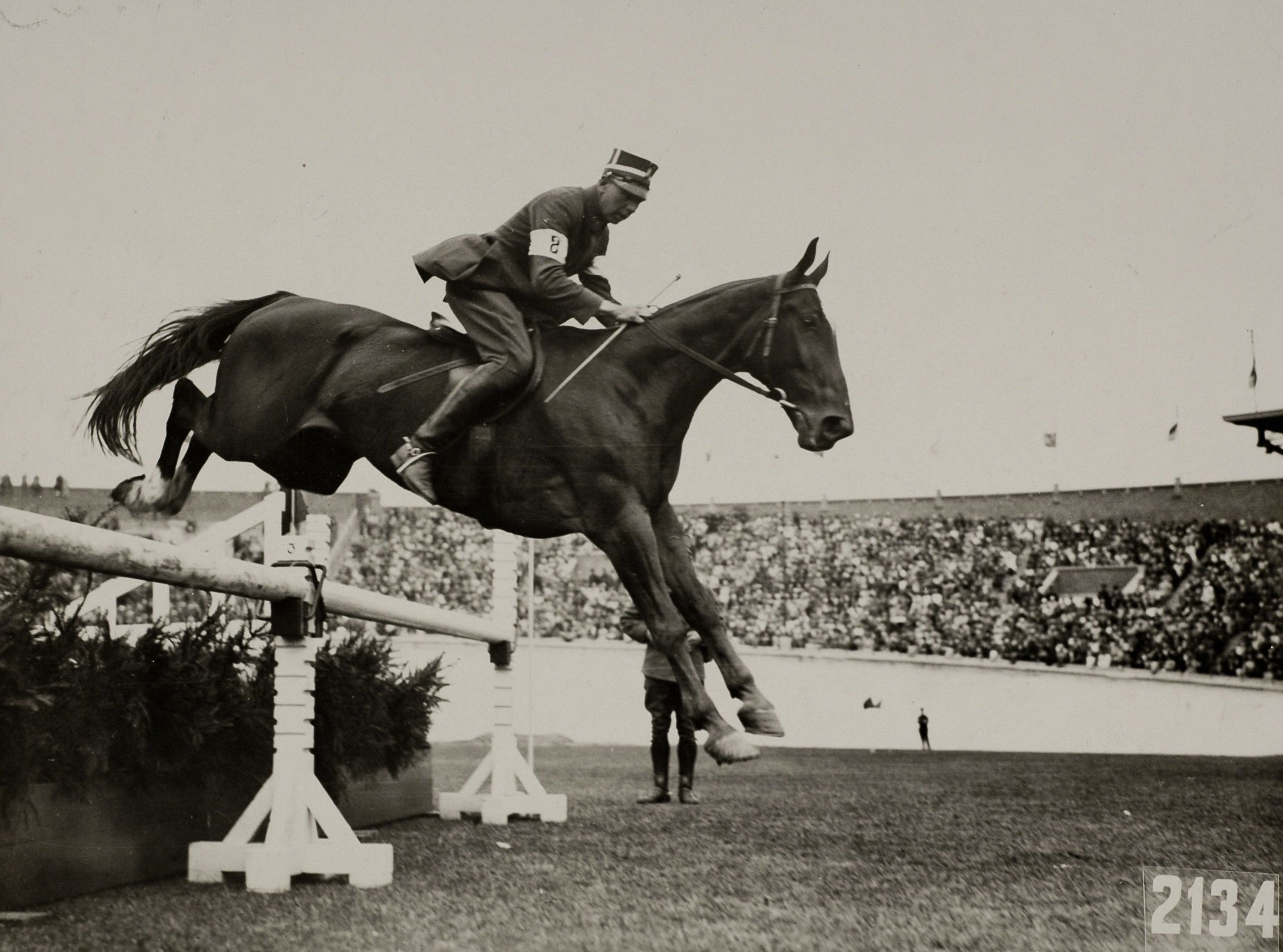
- Qvist in 1928
- Born: 17 February 1896; Kristiania, Norway
- Died: 20 September 1973 (aged 77); Ullensaker, Norway
- Military Service
- Allegiance: Nazi Germany (1941–1945); Norway (1914–1940)
- Branch: Waffen-SS; Royal Norwegian Army
- Rank: SS-Obersturmbannführer
- Unit: Norwegian Legion (1941–1943)
- Conflicts: Second World War; Eastern Front; Siege of Leningrad; Norwegian Campaign (POW)
- Awards: Iron Cross, 1st Class; Iron Cross, 2nd Class; Eastern Medal; Frontkjempermerket

Arthur Qvist (17 February 1896 – 20 September 1973) was a Norwegian military officer, Olympic horse rider and Nazi collaborator. A regular cavalry officer in the pre-war Royal Norwegian Army, Qvist competed in the 1928 Summer Olympics where he earned a silver medal and in the 1936 Summer Olympics. During World War II, he commanded the Waffen-SS's Norwegian Legion as an SS-Obersturmbannführer. After the war, he was sentenced to 8 years in prison for his collaborationist crimes.

== Athletic career ==
Olympic medal record

Men's Equestrian
Silver medal – second place	1928 Amsterdam	Team eventing

In 1928 he and his horse Hidalgo won the silver medal as member of the Norwegian eventing team in the team eventing competition after finishing eighth in the individual eventing.

Eight years later he finished 17th with his horse Jaspis in the individual dressage competition. As member of the Norwegian dressage team they finished seventh in the team dressage competition. Qvist also participated in the individual jumping competition with his horse Notatus and finished 24th. The Norwegian jumping team did not finish the team jumping competition, because only Qvist was able to finish the event.

== Second World War ==
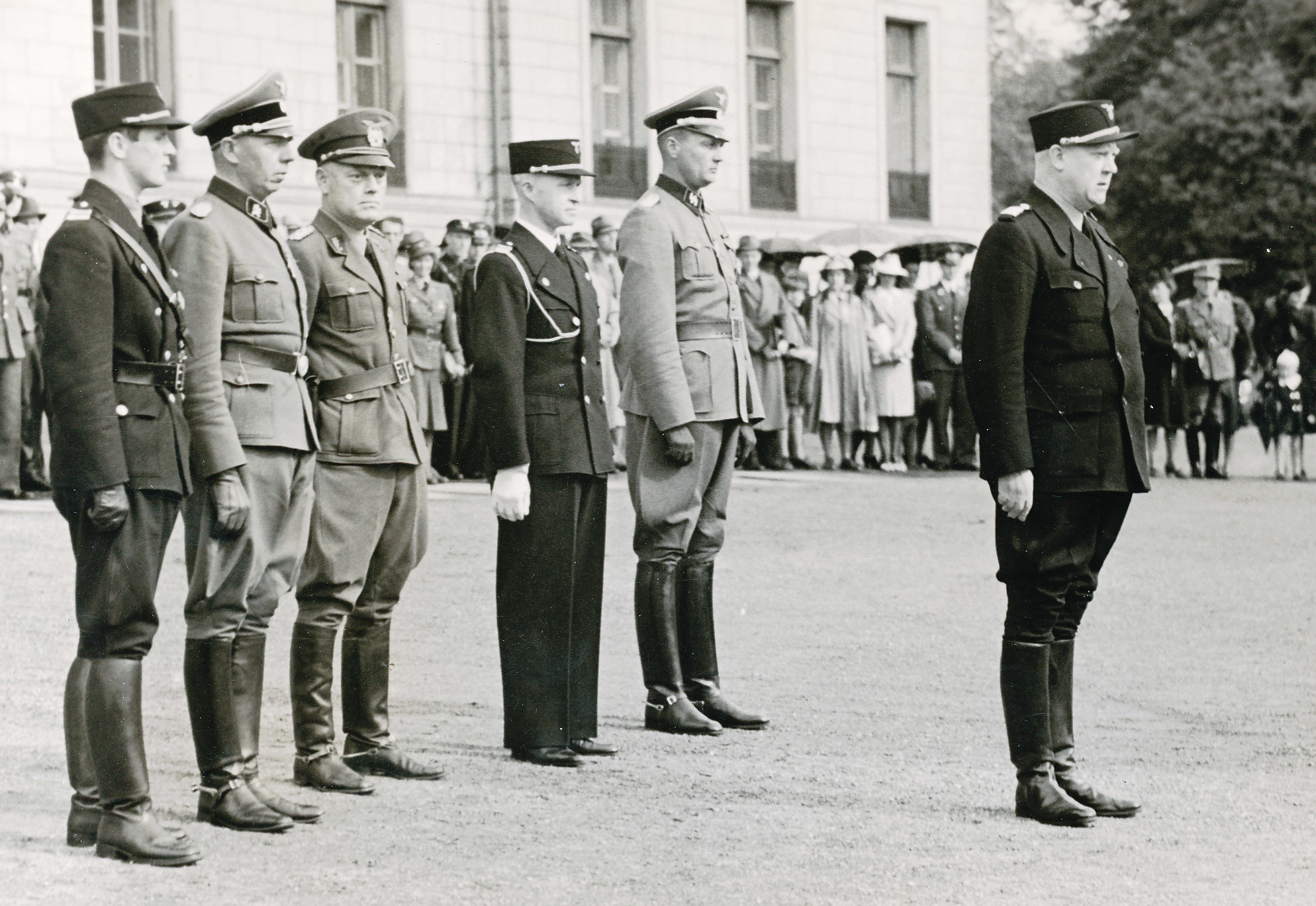
Arthur Qvist, second from left, standing behind Vidkun Quisling and alongside Thorvald Thronsen, Jonas Lie and other senior Norwegian collaborators.

After the German occupation of Norway in World War II, Qvist joined a voluntary unit of the German Waffen-SS, the Norwegian Legion. As an officer he eventually came to command the unit with the rank of SS-Obersturmbannführer.

At his trial after the war he acknowledged his role as commander of the Norwegian Legion and was sentenced to 8 years in prison for treason.
