= Førergarde =

Leader guard of puppet Norwegian government in WWII

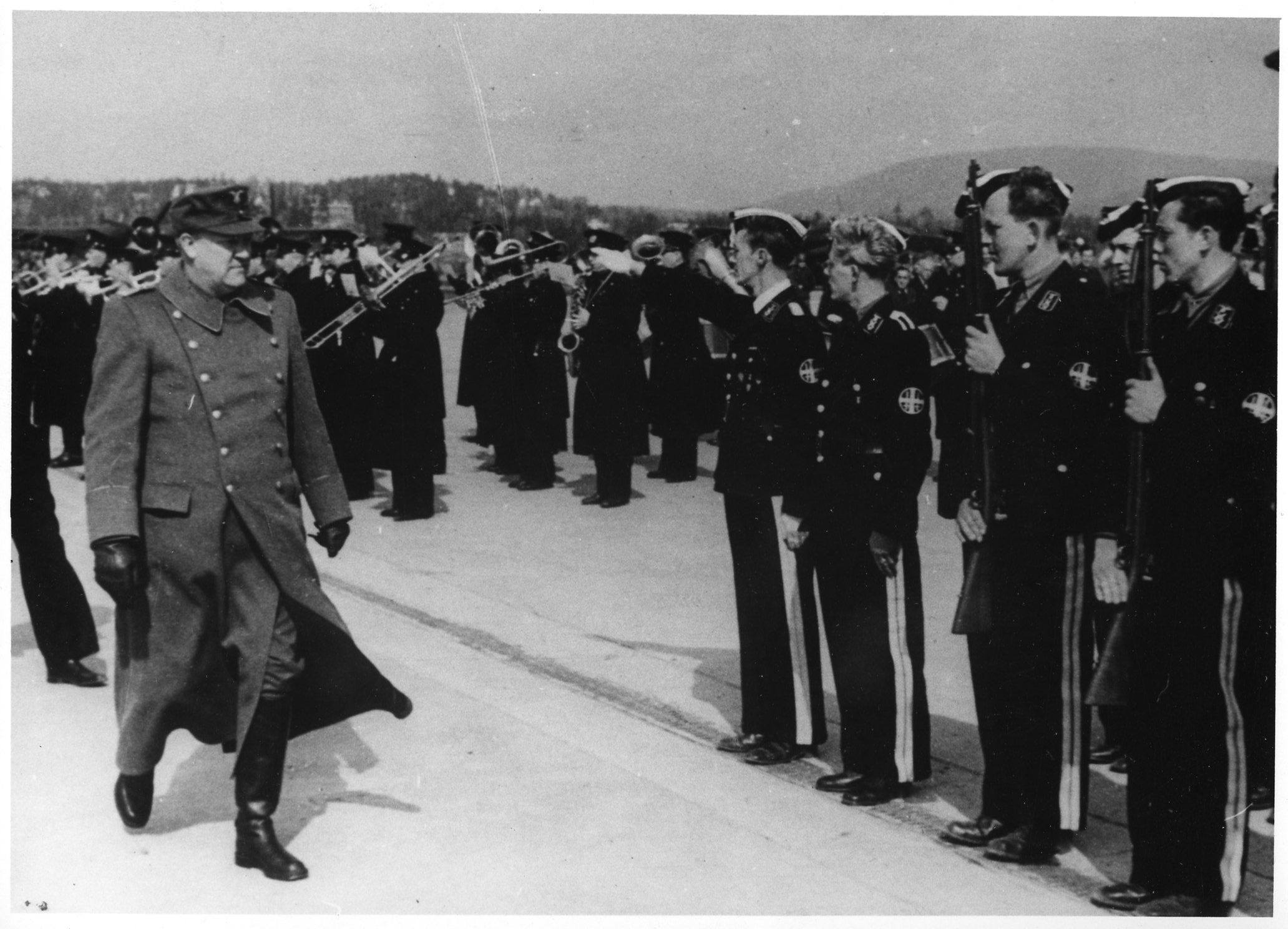
Quisling inspecting the Førergarde. Picture from the National Archives of Norway.

The Førergarde ('leader guard' in Norwegian) was the personal guard of Vidkun Quisling, the leader of the puppet Norwegian government during World War II.

The Førergarde was founded in April 1942. At first, it numbered about 150 people personally selected by Quisling from the members of Hird, the paramilitary wing of the fascist Nasjonal Samling party (NS). They were his most trusted fighters, also performing special tasks. Over time, the unit grew to the size of a company of 250-300 people. They were also recruited from the front veterans of the Volunteer Norwegian Legion and SS-Polizei-Bataillon 506. On August 17, 1943, the Førergarde, together with the police and the Hird organization, formally joined the Norwegian Armed Forces.

The organization was headed by sveitfører Per Carlson (April 20, 1942 - April 1, 1944), Sverre Henschien (until February 1945) and sveitfører Sophus Kahrs (until May 9, 1945).

The members of the bodyguard wore a special oval silver badge with a black enamelled edge. At the top was the emblem of the NS party (St. Olaf's cross), on which sat an eagle with outstretched wings, and below the initials "VQ" in white.

== See also ==
- NS Kamporganisasjon
- Operation Weserübung (the German code name for the attack on Norway and Denmark)
