= SS Ski Jäger Battalion "Norwegen" =

- Freiwilligen-Schikompanie-Norwegen; SS-Skijegerbataljon "Norge"
- Active: July 1943 – January 1945
- Country: Norway
- Allegiance: Germany
- Branch: Waffen-SS
- Type: Infantry
- Size: Battalion

Commanders
- Notable commanders: Sophus Kahrs

The SS Ski Jäger Battalion "Norway" (Norwegian: SS-Skijegerbataljon "Norge", German: Freiwilligen-Schikompanie-Norwegen) was a combat battalion unit within the German Waffen-SS, the armed wing of the Schutzstaffel. It consisted of a majority of volunteers from Norway, and some enlisted German soldiers. Most officers and non-commissioned officers were Norwegian.

It was formed in February 1942 and attached to the 6th SS Mountain Division Nord (although the company was formally a police unit). By the winter of 1943 the company was designated as a combat battalion, with three full infantry companies and a staff company. For almost its entire career, the battalion was part of the 6th SS Mountain Division "Nord", fighting on the Karelian Front in Finland.

In the Battle of Kaprolat in 24–26 June 1944, more than 150 of the battalion's soldiers went missing in action, when two of the battalion's positions (with a total of 190 soldiers) were overrun.

== Operational history ==
During the winter of 1942, a Ski jäger Company, with a strength of 120 men, was formed in Finland with personnel undergoing training in the SS schools and training camps in Germany. The formation of the new Norwegian SS Skijaeger Battalion took place at military training grounds in Oulu, Finland in the autumn of 1943. The battalion CO and a four company commander were both Germans. A few German enlisted men were also included in each company as a "stiffening" element. For the most part the Norwegian officers were young men who had obtained front line experience with the 5th SS Panzer Division Wiking or the "Frw. Legion Norwegen". The Norwegian Ski Battalion was strictly light-weight in nature consisting only of one staff company and three ski (or infantry/assault) companies.

Each company consisted of three platoons, each with three "rifle" squads, and a fourth machine gun squad. The standard issue weapon for the battalion was the MP-40 Submachine Gun, which was the preferred weapon due to the units abilities to do Long-range reconnaissance patrol missions.

In 1943 the Ski Company (Skikompaniet, the predecessor of the "Ski Battalion") was sent to the Kiestinki Front. The battalion was formed in Germany, transported to Oulu in Finland, and later reached Kuusamo. During the winter 1943–1944 the battalion counted around 700 men. As a consequence of an armistice in September 1944, the German Lapland Army, including the battalion, retreated through North Finland into Norway. The Norwegian daily Dagbladet wrote that the unit's soldiers were at the front in Finland until the autumn of 1944, adding that "several [soldiers] were sent to the endfighting in Germany and Austria.
