= John Thronsen =

Norwegian economist

John Thronsen (12 September 1913 – 24 May 2003) was a Norwegian economist.

From 1933 he was a member of the party Nasjonal Samling (so were his brother Thorvald Thronsen, four other siblings, and both parents), and during the occupation of Norway by Nazi Germany a career path opened for him. In October 1940 he was appointed as national chief of finance in Nasjonal Samling.

Thronsen was fired in April 1943. The reason was that a corruption case was filed against him, even though he was not found guilty of it. Thronsen claimed that the corruption case was a revenge from Karl Marthinsen and Jørgen Nordvik, whom Thronsen earlier had called out for stealing.

During the legal purge in Norway after World War II he was convicted of treason, and sentenced to eight years of forced labour. He was released already in 1949. He lived in Bærum in his later life.
