= Order of Trujillo =

Order of Trujillo (Orden de Trujillo)
- Ribbon bar of the order
- Type: seven grade order
- Awarded for: distinguished service to the Dominican Republic
- Country: Dominican Republic
- Presented by: President of the Dominican Republic
- Eligibility: military or civilian
- Established: 13 June 1938
- Final award: 6 December 1961

Precedence
- Next (higher): Order of Merit of Duarte, Sánchez and Mella

The Order of Trujillo (Orden de Trujillo) was the second principal order of the Dominican Republic, after the Order of Merit of Duarte, Sánchez and Mella. It was established on 13 June 1938 in honour of the then-President Generalissimo Rafael Trujillo. The Head of State conferred the order both to civilians and members of the military for distinguished services, regardless of Dominican Republic citizenship.

== Division of the Order ==
The order was divided in seven grades:

- Collar was awarded exclusively to President Trujillo.
- Grand Cross with Gold Breast Star was awarded to the current president, foreign chiefs of state and Hereditary Princes.
- Grand Cross with Silver Breast Star was awarded to former presidents, vice presidents or former vice presidents, members of legislatures and supreme court, ministers of state, ambassadors and the metropolitan archbishop.
- Grand Officer was awarded to service chiefs and high officials of government and church, the Dean of the University, Chief of the Army, Chief of the Navy.
- Commander was awarded to governors of provinces, directors general of instruction, directors of academies, dean of universities, authors and others of similar importance.
- Officer was awarded to professors and heads of schools, officers of the rank of colonel and above and civilians of equal importance.
- Knight was awarded to others not in any of the above category.
