= Kaprolat =

Finnish border position taken by the Soviets in 1944

Battle of Kaprolat and Hasselmann
- Part of the Continuation War of World War II
Date	25–26 June 1944
Location	Karelia in the Soviet Union 66°08′N 31°56′E
Result	Soviet victory

Belligerents
Nazi Germany	Soviet Union

Commanders and leaders
Matthias Kleinheisterkamp	Nikita Petrovich Ivanov

Strength
About 200	Unknown

Casualties and losses
143 of whom 120 killed and 23 died in captivity	Unknown

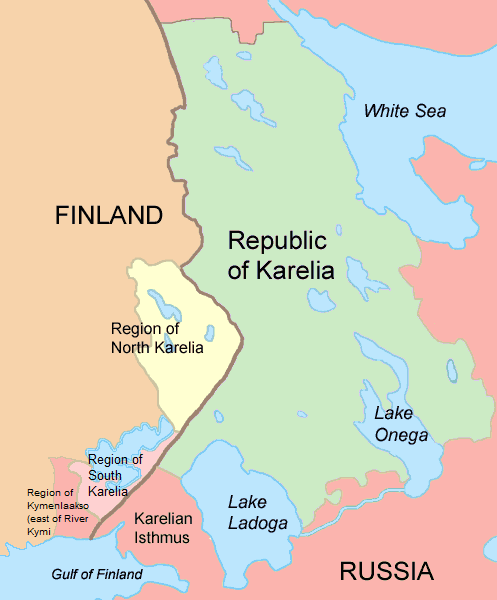
Kaprolat and Hasselmann were located by the large lakes west of the text "White Sea".

Kaprolat, together with the nearby position "Hasselmann", were German names for positions, each on its own hill, in East Karelia on the Russian side of the border during World War II. The positions were located west of the small Karelian town of Louhi. In a Soviet offensive in June 1944, around 120 Norwegian fighters were killed and 23 died in Soviet captivity. This loss, a total of around 143, is the largest loss that has affected a Norwegian combat unit ever.

== The Battle of Kaprolat 1944 ==
At Kaprolat and Hasselmann, there were around 200 Norwegians, and of these, 117 Norwegian fighters were reported missing or killed in combat when they served in the Waffen-SS unit SS "Ski Hunter Battalion Norway" and were defeated by the Red Army in these two places in 25 and June 26, 1944. The Soviet attack was launched on June 25 after SS forces were able to observe that the Soviet forces were building a road through the marshy area using logs.

When the Waffen SS forces realized that they were about to be defeated, a group tried to break out in the south of the other German positions on Hasselmann, but very few succeeded in this. Others tried to hide in the woods and later went north-west. After twelve days of hiking through the forest, this group managed to reach the Sashaikh support point. 50 in total managed to escape.

Around 40 Norwegian fighters are said to have been taken prisoner of war by the Soviet forces.

== After the battles ==
Fifteen Norwegian prisoners of war from the Kaprolat battles returned to Norway in the period between the autumn of 1945 and October 1953. Russian sources state that they had captured 48 soldiers after the fighting.

The area remained closed after the fighting and throughout the post-war period as part of the border areas with Finland. The fallen soldiers were not buried and remain unburied since. After the fall of the Soviet Union, an initiative has been taken to bring the remains of the Norwegian fighters home to Norway. Professor Stein Ugelvik Larsen at the University of Bergen heads the so-called Kaprolat Committee, which works to identify the remains of the Norwegian SS soldiers. The work is financed, among other things, by the Norwegian Ministry of Foreign Affairs with one million kroner.
