= NS Kamporganisasjon =

Group within the fascist Nasjonal Samling party

NS Kamporganisasjon (English: NS Battle Organization) was an elite group within the fascist Nasjonal Samling (NS) party in Norway. Established in 1934 by the NS Central Office, its composition was restricted to NS officers and the most active party members. Each member had to swear a seven-point oath of allegiance to the leader Vidkun Quisling. The group had 4,000 members in 1945.

== See also ==
- Førergarde
