= Comedy Playhouse (series 1) =

The first series of Comedy Playhouse, that continued to be a long-running BBC series, broadcast from 15 December 1961 to 16 February 1962. All the episodes were written by Ray Galton and Alan Simpson.

== Background ==
The first series, which was in black and white, consisted of ten episodes, each of which had a different cast and storyline. Only the fourth episode, The Offer, made it to its own series becoming Steptoe and Son; all other episodes of this series of Comedy Playhouse are lost. The episodes were broadcast on Friday at 8:45pm, except for The Status Symbol, which was broadcast at 8:40pm.

== Episodes ==
| Title | Airdate | Duration | Overview | IMDb link |
|---|---|---|---|---|
| Clicquot Et Fils | 15 December 1961 | 30mins | Set in 1926 France, Clicquot Et Fils featured Eric Sykes as Pierre Clicquot, an undertaker, who comes up with an idea to get more business. Warren Mitchell starred as Alphonse Lagillarde. Clicqot Et Fils was remade for BBC Radio 4, starring Richard Griffiths as Clicquot and Roger Lloyd-Pack as Alphonse, and this was broadcast on 29 December 1998. | |
| Lunch In The Park | 22 December 1961 | 30mins | Lunch In The Park was the story of two middle-aged office workers, Geoffrey Tupper (played by Stanley Baxter) and Ethel Waring (Daphne Anderson). Every Tuesday for a decade they have met for lunch on the same park bench, but they were in for a shock this time. This was remade for Paul Merton In Galton & Simpson's... in 1997. | |
| The Private Lives of Edward Whiteley | 29 December 1961 | 30mins | This programme was set around Edward Whitley (played by Tony Britton), a bigamist. Raymond Huntley played Hargreaves. | |
| The Offer | 5 January 1962 | 30mins | The Offer featured Wilfrid Brambell and Harry H. Corbett as Albert and Harold Steptoe, a father and son who run a London rag and bone business. Following this pilot, a series was commissioned, and on 14 June 1962, Steptoe and Son was broadcast. It ran for eight series until 1974. | |
| The Reunion | 12 January 1962 | 30mins | This episode focused on a reunion of old friends, and the resulting consequences. It featured Lee Montague (as Maurice Woolly), J. G. Devlin (Paddy O'Hanahan), Dick Emery (Arthur Clench), Patrick Cargill (Bow-Tie Bertie), Jerold Wells (Sammy Burton), Bernard Goldman (Johnny Burton), David Gregory (Tommy Whitelaw) and Cameron Hall (Colonel Yateley). | |
| The Telephone Call | 19 January 1962 | 30mins | Peter Jones starred as Lionel Baxter, who decides to do something about the problems of the World with the help of his telephone. June Whitfield starred as Sandra Baxter, Richard Caldicot as Mr Croxley, Derek Bond as Mr Gore-Willoughby MP, Harold Lang as a BBC producer and Roger Avon. | |
| The Status Symbol | 26 January 1962 | 35mins | The Status Symbol centred on Wilfred Swann (played by Alfred Marks) and his Rolls-Royce. The car is in the garage of Cyril Bradley (Graham Stark), who instead of fixing it puts it on show on his forecourt. | |
| Visiting Day | 2 February 1962 | 30mins | Visiting Day was set in a hospital, with the patients both looking forward to and dreading visiting day. It starred Bernard Cribbins as Cakebread, Betty Marsden as Mother, Wilfrid Brambell as Father, Hugh Lloyd as the first patient and Molly Weir as Nurse Forbes. | |
| Sealed with a Loving Kiss | 9 February 1962 | 30mins | Arnold, played by Ronald Fraser, and Freda, played by Avril Elgar, have been having a relationship by correspondence and when they meet for the first time they discover neither has been totally truthful. Also starring Gladys Henson as Arnold's mother, Vic Wise as the Station porter and Rita Webb as the trolley lady. | |
| The Channel Swimmer | 16 February 1962 | 30mins | This episode focused on the fortunes of Clive (played by Michael Brennan), a channel swimmer and those around him. Sydney Tafler played Lionel, Warren Mitchell played Austin, Frank Thornton played the Official, Bob Todd played the Boat pilot and Joe Gibbons played the manager of the other swimmer. | |
