= Thorvald Thronsen =

Norwegian paramilitary officer (1917–2003)

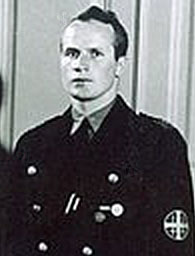

Thorvald Thronsen (1 February 1917 – 15 June 2003) was a Norwegian paramilitary officer.

From 1933 he was a member of the Fascist party Nasjonal Samling, and during the occupation of Norway by Nazi Germany a career path opened for him, even though he sustained shell shock during the fighting of 1940. He was chief of staff in the Hird - the party's paramilitary organisation modelled on the Nazi German Sturmabteilungen - from November 1940 to February 1944, except for 1941 when he served at the Eastern Front. He was pressured to leave the Hird after his brother John Thronsen got mixed up in intrigues.

During the legal purge in Norway after World War II he was not convicted, because he was regarded as insane. He was ordered to stay in Norway, but went to Spain and Brazil, before returning to Norway in 1954.
