= Finn Kjelstrup =

Norwegian civil servant (1884–1961)

Finn Hannibal Kjelstrup (7 November 1884 – 5 December 1961) was a Norwegian military officer.

Finn H. Kjelstrup was a graduate of the Norwegian Military Academy.

From 1907 Kjelstrup served the king of Belgium in the Congo Free State:

The Union between Norway and Sweden was dissolved peacefully in 1905, leaving many young officers without a posting in the armed forces. Instead, Lieutenant Kjelstup enlisted for service in the Congo Free State. After a three months training course in Brussels, he set sail for Africa.

In June 1907, he arrived in the port town of Boma in the Congo, the start of a three-year term of service for colonial King Leopold II. It wasn’t long before the 23-year-old lieutenant became commanding officer for an area as large as Denmark.

Finn H. Kjelstrup was soon promoted to military commander of the Haut Kasai Territory, in the south of the country. He ran the remote station of Dilolo, near the border to Portuguese West Africa (Angola), and was often the only European at the post. Finn H. Kjelstrup travelled extensively in the region, recording and mapping. At the station, he set up building projects, began the cultivation of fruit and vegetables and opened a market for soldiers and their families.

The uniformed soldiers provoked the local people. Many chieftains refused to send carriers to the caravans, deliver food to the soldiers, or to humble themselves in any way. Kjelstrup preferred a diplomatic approach, so that neither side was seen to lose face. He sometimes left his weapons behind when visiting hostile villages, and always returned home safely. Soon after a gift would appear – a hen, some honey, an antelope – a sign that the local chieftain had accepted the colonial representative.

In a letter from 1908, Kjelstrup wrote: "Blacks are exceeding better than the impression we get of them from accounts and illustrations in Europe. They are handsome, kind and devoted." Kjelstrup believed it was important to understand the local people’s way of thinking, and studied the book Études etnographiques before his meetings with local chieftains.

Those who drew to the Congo knew perfectly well that not all would return. Of the 60 Norwegian officers stationed in the Congo, 20 died. Kjelstup established a cemetery for Europeans in Dilolo, and even selected a plot for himself. Kjelstrup made it safely back to Norway, but he had the feeling that he had risen from the dead. He had long resigned himself to a Congolese grave.

He returned to Norway in 1910.

He bestowed 75 objects on the Museum of Cultural Heritage. The most beautiful is the chieftain's chair. It was probably made by the Chokwe people and depicts episodes in the life of a chieftain. It was given to Kjelstrup by the king of the Lunda people, Muata Yamva.

Thereafter he served as senior lieutenant and captain. In 1933 he was appointed major, and in 1937 he became principal officer in the Ministry of Defence.

When Germany invaded Norway in 1940 he became a member of Nasjonal Samling.:

On 25 September 1940, Kjelstrup was hired in the Ministry of the Interior as head of the civil administration of the Norwegian Army and Navy. In 1941 he agitated for the formation of the Norwegian Legion (German: Freiwilligen Legion Norwegen), and served as its chief of staff in Norway, from 29 June to 1 December 1941, with the rank of Colonel, before he resigned due to disagreements with the German authorities.

The German occupation ended on 8 May 1945. In 1947, as a part of the legal purge in Norway after World War II, Kjelstrup was sentenced to forced labour. He was pardoned one year later for good intentions.

He was afterwards active in the organization Forbundet for sosial oppreisning and wrote in the newspaper Folk og Land. He died in 1961.
