= Norwegian Legion =

- Freiwilligen-Legion Norwegen; Norske Legion
- Standard of the Norske Legion
- Active: 29 June 1941 – March 1943
- Disbanded: March 1943
- Country: Norway (Quisling regime)
- Allegiance: Nazi Germany
- Branch: Waffen-SS
- Type: Infantry
- Role: Rear security
- Size: Approximately 1,900 men
- Engagements: World War II

Commanders
- Notable commanders: Finn Kjelstrup; Arthur Qvist

Norwegian Legion (Norwegian: Norske Legion, German: Freiwilligen-Legion Norwegen) was a Norwegian collaborationist formation of the Waffen-SS during World War II. It was formed in German-occupied Norway on 29 June 1941, in support of the war aims of Nazi Germany. The unit was disbanded in 1943.

== History ==
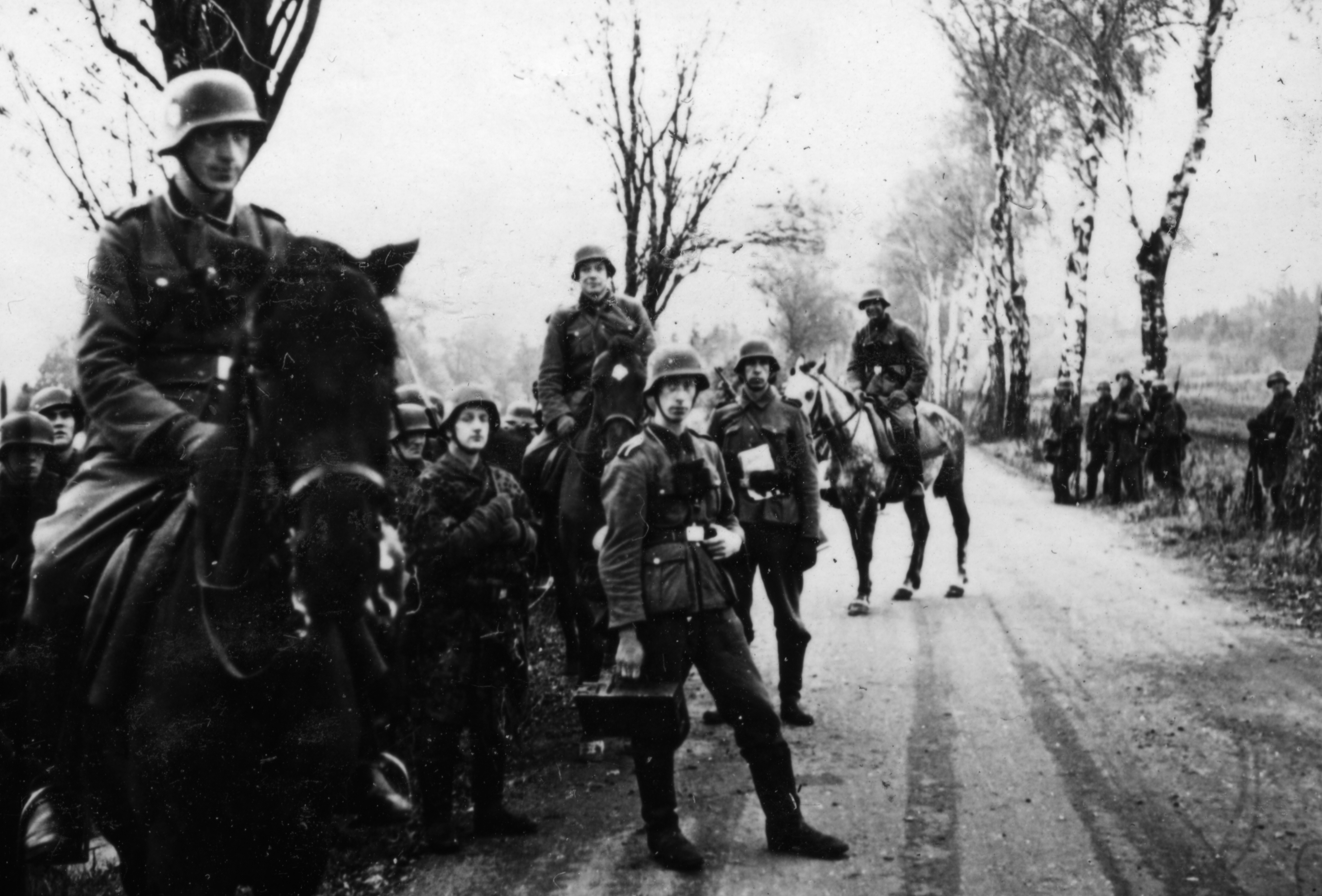
Norwegian Legion in Northern Russia, summer 1942.

The unit was formed from volunteers who were assured that it would be a Norwegian unit with Norwegian officers, uniforms and language and that its area of operations would be Finland. Instead, the unit was deployed to Northern Russia in the occupied Soviet Union, in the Army Group North Rear Area. This was done by the Germans to avoid reinforcing any Norwegian territorial claims to the Kola Peninsula and the Finnish Petsamo region, which were desired by the Quisling regime. Initially, Quisling hoped to deploy over 30,000 Norwegian legionaries to Finnish Lapland, but this was rejected by both the Germans and the Finns.

Coming under the control of the 2 SS Infantry Brigade, the Legion was stationed at Krasnoye Selo near Leningrad in February 1942. In May 1942, the unit was withdrawn, returning in June 1942. The Legion left the occupied Soviet Union in 1943, having suffered over 180 casualties in a year. During that period, it had been reinforced by the 1 SS and Police Company under the command of the head of the paramilitary Norges SS, Jonas Lie. The Legion was disbanded in March 1943. The personnel who wanted to continue the SS service were transferred to the SS Division Nordland.

== Commanders ==
- Legion-Sturmbannfuhrer Finn Kjelstrup (June – 1 December 1941)
- Legion-Sturmbannfuhrer Jørgen Bakke (?–15 December 1941)
- SS-Obersturmbannfuhrer Arthur Qvist (December 1941 – March 1943)

== See also ==
- Battle of Kaprolat, greatest loss of life of Norwegian SS fighters.
