= Hans Storhaug =

Norwegian resistance member (1915–1995)

Hans "Kyllingen" Storhaug, MM, DSM (23 May 1915 – 8 June 1995) was a Norwegian resistance member during World War II, especially noted for his role in the heavy water sabotage 1942–1943, and for his participation in the SOE operation Grebe and Grebe Red in Østerdalen 1943–1945.

== Personal life ==
Storhaug was born in Rena, a son of Ludvig Storhaug and Emilie Røed. He was a brother-in-law of singer and songwriter Alf Prøysen, who married his sister Else Storhaug in 1948.

== World War II ==
Following the German invasion of Norway in April 1940 Storhaug participated in the defence of Norway as a soldier. He fought against the Germans in Solør on 18 April, and later took part in skirmishes at Dovre. In December 1940 he traveled from Ålesund to Scotland, where he joined the Norwegian Independent Company 1 (Norwegian: Kompani Linge). He took part in Operation Anklet, the Commando raid on Reine on 26 December 1941.

He was recruited a member of the Swallow/Gunnerside team which was parachuted onto the Hardangervidda plateau on 16 February 1943, along with Joachim Rønneberg (leader of the group), Knut Haukelid, Fredrik Kayser, Birger Strømsheim and Kasper Idland. After joining the preparatory Grouse team, the combined group succeeded in the destruction of heavy water equipment and stock at Vemork in February 1943.

After the mission at Vemork Storhaug escaped by ski to Sweden, together with four of the other Gunnerside members. From Sweden he returned to Britain.

He participated in the Operation Grebe, where six SOE soldiers were paradropped in Eastern Norway in October 1943. Three of the six men were killed immediately, drowning after landing in a lightly frozen lake. The other three made their way to Sweden. They returned to Norway in March 1944 (renamed Grebe Red), and operated behind enemy lines in Østerdalen until the war ended.

== Legacy ==
Storhaug participated in the 1948 film Kampen om tungtvannet, where he played himself. In the 2015 television series The Heavy Water War, Endre Ellefsen played the character "Hans Storhaug".

== Honors ==
- Norway - St. Olav's Medal With Oak Branch
- Norway - Haakon VIIs 70th Anniversary Medal
- United Kingdom - Distinguished Service Medal
- United Kingdom - Military Medal
- France - Legion of Honor
- United States - Medal of Freedom
