= Ragnar Ulstein =

Norwegian journalist (1920–2019)

- Born: Ragnar Leif Ulstein; 19 April 1920; Ulstein Municipality, Sunnmøre, Norway
- Died: 3 December 2019 (aged 99)
- Military career
- Allegiance: Norway
- Branch: Norwegian Army
- Service years: 1940–1947
- Awards: King's Medal of Merit in gold Defence Medal 1940–1945; St. Olav's Medal With Oak Branch, twice Military Medal (United Kingdom)
- Other work: Journalism; Military historiography

Ragnar Leif Ulstein MM (19 April 1920 – 3 December 2019) was a Norwegian journalist, writer and resistance member. He wrote several documentary books from the Second World War, including surveys of the SOE group Norwegian Independent Company 1, volunteers sailing from Norway to Scotland, refugee traffic from Norway to Sweden, and military intelligence in Norway.

== Early life and World War II ==
Ulstein was born in Ulstein Municipality, Sunnmøre, as the son of Johannes Olsson Ulstein (1879–1969) and Borghild Strand (1885–1964). He finished his secondary education at Volda in June 1940. Later that year he fled to the United Kingdom due to World War II and the German occupation of Norway. Here, Ulstein became a member of the Norwegian Independent Company 1 (NOR.I.C.1) (Norwegian: Kompani Linge), led by Martin Linge. He participated in Operation Anklet, a raid at Reine in December 1941. After the raid he returned to the United Kingdom. In 1943 he was a part of the failed operation Vestige I, which involved placing limpet mines on ships in Svelgen harbor. The actual mine placing was performed by Harald Svindseth, but the explosives went off too early, and the ship was docked instead of sinking. Participants in Vestige I fled to England. In 1944 Ulstein was tasked with returning to work as an instructor for Milorg in Sogn og Fjordane. He came via Shetland and landed near Florø together with Harald Svindseth. Svindseth built up a Milorg subgroup near Svelgen with the codename Snowflake, whereas Ulstein led the group Siskin. Siskin's basecamp was at Fosskamben in Sogndalsdalen. Important local contacts were Olav Rise in Leikanger as well as Nils Knagenhjelm and Hans H. H. Heiberg in Kaupanger. Norwegian Independent Company 1 men Nils Fjeld and Nils Thorsvik also participated, sharing the military command with Ulstein. Various incidents in February 1945 spelled the end of Siskin. Some, including Olav Rise, were arrested, whereas Ulstein managed to flee from Sogndalsdalen. German forces approached Fosskamben, but local residents secretly slowed down their travel, giving Siskin members time to hide a large weapons cache and to escape. Ulstein, Heiberg and Knagenhjelm met in Fjærland. A new base was started in Frønningen. At most, 480 people had some connection to it. It did not remain operative for long, as it was disbanded at the liberation of Norway on 8 May 1945. Then, Ulstein and 72 others travelled to Gaular to assist in the decommissioning of German forces in the area. For his war contributions Ulstein was decorated with the St. Olav's Medal with two oak branches, the British Military Medal, the Defence Medal 1940 – 1945, and the Haakon VII 70th Anniversary Medal.

== Post-war life ==
After the war Ulstein participated in the Independent Norwegian Brigade Group in Germany. When returning to Norway he was editor-in-chief of the newspaper Fjordabladet from 1948 to 1949. He was an active writer. He co-edited the official two-volume work on the NOR.I.C.1 company, Kompani Linge, issued in 1948, together with Erling Jensen and Per Ratvik. The books had introductions by both King Haakon and Milorg leader Jens Christian Hauge. Ulstein worked as an editor for Filmavisen, and from 1954 as a journalist for various newspapers, including Bergens Tidende and Sunnmørsposten. He was later granted a government scholarship.

He made his fiction debut in 1961 with the novel Harpegjengen. He later wrote several documentary books on Norwegian resistance during World War II. The two-volume book Englandsfarten (Volume I, 1965 and Volume II, 1967) covered the traffic between Norway and United Kingdom during the early part of the war, while Svensketrafikken (three volumes, 1974, 1975 and 1977) covered traffic of refugees from Norway to Sweden during the occupation. He wrote a three volume book set on military intelligence in Norway between 1940 and 1945, Etterretningstjenesten i Norge 1940-45 (1989, 1990, 1992), including activities from Special Intelligence Service agents covering German naval operations, as well as activities from XU and other organizations. For his post-war work, Ulstein has been awarded the King's Medal of Merit in gold.

Ulstein was also involved in the Liberal Party in Ålesund. In 1972 he chaired the county chapter of Ja til EF. He married Jenny Hermine Akselsen in 1951.

In his later years Ulstein contributed to the website document.no, and stated in an interview for the 70-year anniversary of the war's end that freedom had become more limited and less open than after the liberation in 1945, and that freedom had come under a pressure "we could never dream about".

== Honours and awards ==
- King's Medal of Merit in gold
- Defence Medal 1940–1945
- St. Olav's Medal With Oak Branch, twice
- Military Medal (United Kingdom)
- Haakon VII's 70-Medal

== Selected works ==
- Kompani Linge. 1948. (2 volumes; jointly with Erling Jensen and Per Ratvik)
- Harpegjengen. 1961., novel
- Parade. 1964., novel
- Englandsfarten. 1965–67. (2 volumes)
- Samarbeid om samferdsel: Møre og Romsdal fylkesbåtar 1920–1970. 1970.
- Svensketrafikken. 1974–77. (3 volumes)
- Småsamfunn i storkrig. Historia om Giske 1940–1945. 1980.
- By og land i 100 år, Sunnmørsposten 1882–1982. 1984.
- Etterretningstjenesten i Norge 1940–1945. 1989–92. (3 volumes)
- Jødar på flukt. 1995.
- Lagunen og stormen. Ulstein – bygd i Europa 1940–45. 1999.
