= Odd Starheim =

Norwegian resistance fighter and SOE agent

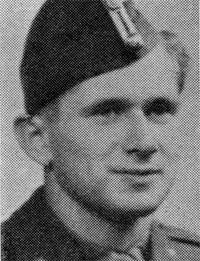
- Born: 14 June 1916; Lista Municipality, Lister og Mandal
- Died: 1 March 1943 (aged 26); North Sea
- Burial place: Lista, Vest-Agder
- Military career
- Allegiance: Norway
- Branch: SOE
- Service years: 1940–1943
- Rank: Captain
- Unit: Norwegian Independent Company 1
- Conflicts: Second World War: Norwegian Campaign (POW); Operation Cheese; Operation Carhampton †
- Awards: (Norway) War Cross (United Kingdom) Distinguished Service Order

Odd Kjell Starheim, DSO (14 June 1916 – 1 March 1943) was a Norwegian resistance fighter and SOE agent during the Second World War. He died when a Norwegian ship he had captured off the coast of Norway was sunk by German bombers on its way back to the United Kingdom.

== Early life ==
Born in Lista Municipality in Lister og Mandal county, Odd Starheim was the son of ship captain Kjetil Starheim and his wife Amalie, née Leonhardsen. He attended chief mate school and radio school in the pre-Second World War years, and served for six years as an officer and radio operator in the Norwegian Merchant Navy. During his childhood Starheim was a Scout, idolizing Scout Movement founder Robert Baden-Powell and Norwegian explorer Fridtjof Nansen.

== Second World War ==
When Norway was invaded by Germany Starheim joined the Norwegian Army opposing the invasion, but was soon captured. He later went to Sweden and attempted to make his way to the United Kingdom from there, but could not find a way to do so. He returned to Norway, and after slowly accumulating enough fuel, made his way to the United Kingdom on the boat Viking from Rauna, near Farsund, together with two other men. The boat set off on 11 August 1940, but was forced back the next day by bad weather. On 13 August Viking set off again, and reached Aberdeen on 17 August despite encountering another storm during the voyage across the North Sea.

He was among the pioneer members of the SOE branch called Norwegian Independent Company 1 (NOR.I.C.1), hand-picked by Captain Martin Linge, going on three missions to Norway and organizing intelligence work in Southern Norway. He was in charge of the SOE intelligence operation Cheese, together with double agent and radio operator Gunvald Tomstad. For Cheese Starheim was landed by submarine at the Norwegian coast near Farsund in December 1940, making his way ashore by kayak and carrying his radio set 25 miles inland despite suffering from flu. The purpose of the mission was to find out what had happened to the two men with whom he had originally escaped Norway (and one other), who had already been returned to Norway on another mission—They had been captured and executed. During the mission Starheim became the first SOE agent to establish radio contact between occupied Europe and the United Kingdom, on 25 February 1941. During his mission he radioed a report to the United Kingdom on the first sighting of the German battleship Bismarck during her maiden voyage. He remained in Norway until June 1941, organising the resistance, and remaining in radio contact with UK. Realising he was in danger, he escaped to Sweden and was then returned to the UK. On 2 January 1942 he and fellow agent Andreas Fasting became the first to parachute into occupied Norway. This time he was aiming to re-establish radio contact between the Norwegian resistance and the United Kingdom as the radio operator left behind after his previous mission had stopped transmitting.

While in Oslo he was captured by the Gestapo, during his interrogation, he managed to snatch back his identity papers and jump from a second storey window to make his escape. He signalled to the United Kingdom that he needed to be extracted, but an attempt to take him off in a fishing boat failed. Not wishing to risk an escape to Sweden for a third time, he came up with daring plan for which he is best known, the hijacking of the coastal steamer SS Galtesund in Flekkefjord on 15 March 1942. He brought her over to the UK, together with a small group of people. Amongst the group was Einar Skinnarland, who was in possession of important information on the heavy water plant at Vemork. The capture of Galtesund was aided by a secret radio transmitter in Norway which radioed London, requesting air support for the vessel. The air support arrived on 16 March and the ship made it safely to Aberdeen. Starheim had not received permission from his superiors in the United Kingdom to capture Galtesund, and carried out the operation entirely on his own initiative. On 2 July 1942, his British superiors in the SOE recommended him for the British Military Cross, in the end he was awarded the higher-level Distinguished Service Order on 2 July 1942.

He also organized the failed Operation Carhampton in 1943, an attempt to take over a German shipping convoy. The success of the Galtesund operation helped persuade the British in approving of the new, more ambitious plan. In the operation Starheim and 40 Norwegian soldiers were landed near Abelsnes in Vest-Agder by the Norwegian patrol boat Bodø. Thirty of Starheim's men were from NOR.I.C.1, while the remaining 10 belonged to the Royal Norwegian Navy. The first attempt, on 10 January, at capturing a convoy failed when the coordination of the various groups was lost. A second attempt on 17 January ended in a gunfight between the commandos and German guards. The group's cover blown, the Norwegians were hunted by large German forces and had to be assisted by local resistance people in order to survive. After an aborted attempt at attacking the strategically significant mines at Knaben the whole operation was called off. The leadership in London had not supported the plans to attack Knaben, instead approving of an attack on the titanium mine Titania in Sokndal Municipality, and the capture of a 10,000-ton ship in the Jøssingfjorden. The commandos were supposed to have escaped Titania by using the mine trolleys. Starheim and 12 other Carhampton members hijacked the Norwegian coastal passenger/cargo steamship SS Tromøsund on 28 February in an attempt to bring the ship over to Scotland, but Tromøsund never reached the UK, being sunk by German aircraft. All those on board, including the 13 commandos, the 26 crew, two passengers and three German prisoners of war, lost their lives when Tromøsund sank. Starheim and the ship's captain were the only ones whose bodies were recovered, drifting ashore on Tjörn near Bohuslän. Of the members of the operation who did not sail on Tromøsund 16 made their way to West Hartlepool in North East England by fishing boat, four men were given new missions in Norway and the rest made their way to neutral Sweden. Starheim was buried in his birthplace Lista. In addition to his British DSO, he was awarded the Norwegian War Cross.

== Biography ==
- Hauge, Eiliv Odde (1955). Mannen som stjal Galtesund (in Norwegian). Also published as Salt Water Thief (in English).
