= Operation Cheese =

Special Operation by British Special Operations Executive (SOE) during WW2

Operation Cheese was an intelligence operation carried out by the British Special Operations Executive (SOE) in Norway during World War II. Key persons were Odd Starheim and Gunvald Tomstad, who established radio communications with UK and developed an intelligence network in Southern Norway. The radio station was located at Tomstad's farm Helle, 3 kilometres (1.9 mi) outside the town Flekkefjord.

== Literature ==
- Hauge, Eiliv Odde (1955). Mannen som stjal Galtesund (in Norwegian). Cappelen.
- Hansson, Per (1965). Det største spillet (in Norwegian). Gyldendal.
