= The Heavy Water War =

Norwegian war drama miniseries

- Also known as: Kampen om tungtvannet (Norway); The Saboteurs (United Kingdom)
- Genre: War
- Written by: Petter S. Rosenlund
- Directed by: Per-Olav Sørensen
- Starring: Espen Klouman Høiner; Christoph Bach; Anna Friel; Pip Torrens; Dennis Storhøi; David Zimmerschied; Søren Pilmark; Benjamin Helstad
- Composer: Kristian Eidnes Andersen
- Countries of origin: Norway; Denmark; United Kingdom
- Original languages: Norwegian; German; English; Danish
- No. of seasons: 1
- No. of episodes: 6

Production
- Producer: Kari Moen Kristiansen
- Production locations: Vemork, Rjukan
- Cinematography: John Christian Rosenlund
- Editors: Per-Erik Eriksen; Silje Nordseth; Martin Stoltz
- Running time: 45 minutes
- Production companies: Filmkameratene (Norway); Sebasto Film (Denmark); Headline Pictures (UK); NRK

Original release
- Network: NRK
- Release: 4 January – 1 February 2015

The Heavy Water War (original title Kampen om tungtvannet and alternative title The Saboteurs (United Kingdom)) is a six-episode war drama television miniseries written by Petter S. Rosenlund and produced by Norwegian Broadcasting Corporation. It is a Norwegian/Danish/British co-production directed by Per-Olav Sørensen based on the true story of the German nuclear weapon project during the Second World War and the heavy water sabotage in Norway to disrupt it, with a particular emphasis on the role of the Norwegian intelligence officer Leif Tronstad.

The first two episodes were initially broadcast on NRK1, on 4 January 2015. The opening episodes had 1,259,000 viewers, which was a record for the opening of a drama series in Norway. In Denmark, the initial broadcast was on 4 May 2015 on TV 2 titled Kampen om det tunge vand. In the UK, the miniseries, retitled The Saboteurs, was aired by More4 from 19 June 2015 and had a good critical reception. The series was released in the UK on DVD and Blu-ray on 10 August 2015. In Poland the show premiered on 15 January 2016 on ipla VOD to very good reviews. Viewing rights for France were bought by Entertainment One, for Benelux by Lumière, for Spain by A Contracorriente, for Poland by Kino Swiat and for the Balkans by Stas Media. Viewing rights for the US were bought by MHz Networks, which announced a DVD release date of 8 March 2016.

== Production ==
The series was filmed in Norway and the Czech Republic. Production costs were around 75 million Norwegian kroner, or about €7.8 million. The dialogue is in Norwegian, German, English and Danish.

== Main cast ==
Although the series is based on real events and persons, apart from Aubert, all other Nazi collaborating Hydro directors were purposely not mentioned by name.

- Espen Klouman Høiner as Major Leif Tronstad
- Christoph Bach as Werner Heisenberg
- Pip Torrens as Colonel John Skinner Wilson, SOE
- Anna Friel as Captain Julie Smith (fictitious)
- Søren Pilmark as Niels Bohr
- Stein Winge as Axel Aubert, Director-General of Norsk Hydro
- Dennis Storhøi as Bjørn Henriksen, plant director (fictitious)
- Maibritt Saerens as Ellen Henriksen, plant director's wife (fictitious)
- Espen Reboli Bjerke as Jomar Brun
- David Zimmerschied as Carl Friedrich von Weizsäcker
- Andreas Döhler as Kurt Diebner, director of the German nuclear energy project
- Robert Hunger-Bühler as General der Artillerie Emil Leeb, Chief of the Waffenamt
- Corey Johnson as Major General Pat Pritchard, USAAF (fictitious)
- Peri Baumeister as Elisabeth Heisenberg

=== Operation "Grouse" ===
- Torstein Bjørklund as Sergeant Arne Kjelstrup
- Benjamin Helstad as Second Lieutenant Jens-Anton Poulsson
- Rolf Kristian Larsen as Einar Skinnarland
- Christian Rubeck as Sergeant Claus Helberg
- Audun Sandem as Second Lieutenant Knut Haugland

=== Operation "Gunnerside" ===
- Endre Ellefsen as Sergeant Hans Storhaug
- Ole Christoffer Ertvaag as Sergeant Birger Strømsheim
- Eirik Evjen as Second Lieutenant Kasper Idland
- Frank Kjosås as Second Lieutenant Knut Haukelid
- Mads Sjøgård Pettersen as Sergeant Fredrik Kayser
- Tobias Santelmann as Second Lieutenant Joachim Rønneberg

== Episodes ==
No.	Title	Original release date
1	"Episode 1"	4 January 2015
Germany invades Norway and orders a doubling of production at the heavy water plant in Rjukan. Norwegian professor Leif Tronstad escapes to England to warn the Allies about what he believes is an effort to build a German atomic bomb.
2	"Episode 2"	4 January 2015
Tronstad establishes contact with the War Ministry and a plan to destroy the Hydro facilities is drawn up. In Rjukan, new managing director Erik Henriksen is confronted with sabotage of the heavy water facility. Operation Grouse is a disastrous failure.
3	"Episode 3"	11 January 2015
The Americans insist on bombing the heavy water factory, but Tronstad persuades the Allies to send in a team of Norwegians instead. In Germany, Nobel Prize winner Werner Heisenberg promises a breakthrough in the development of a Nazi atomic bomb.
4	"Episode 4"	18 January 2015
Heisenberg is appointed director of the Kaiser Wilhelm Institute. The Gunnerside team succeeds in damaging the Hydro factory, but the Germans mount a major search for the saboteurs and order an immediate rebuilding of the heavy water facilities.
5	"Episode 5"	25 January 2015
Werner Heisenberg must continue his research without heavy water. When they learn that the Germans are rebuilding the factory, the Americans decide to bomb it. The bombing causes minimal damage.
6	"Episode 6"	1 February 2015
The Germans decide to move heavy water production from Norway to Germany. The Allies order the remaining members of the Gunnerside team to sink the ferry carrying heavy water facilities across the lake from Rjukan.

== Reception ==
Norwegian newspaper Verdens Gang gave the series a 5 out of 6, citing "It will enrage some historians, and some concerned will complain, but most television viewers will be engrossed".

The series won the 2015 Prix Italia in the Series and Serials category, with the citation: "A thriller with superb acting, a high-quality production. Great cinematography, outstanding acting, excellent directing."

=== Viewer numbers ===
The two first episodes were seen by 1.259 million in Norway, the third episode was seen by 1.239 million and the fourth by 1.288 million. The fifth episode was seen by 1.319 million while the last was seen 1.322 million. The last episode was watched by 64% of TV viewers that hour.

=== Historicity ===
From the première there has been debate over its historical accuracy. Among concerns have been Heisenberg's involvement in the development of nuclear weapons and allusions to his homosexuality.

== Previous versions ==
The same story was covered in the 1948 Franco-Norwegian film Kampen om tungtvannet (also known as La bataille de l'eau lourde or Operation Swallow: The Battle for Heavy Water). Quite faithful to real events, it even had many of the original Norwegian commandos starring as themselves.

The 1965 British film The Heroes of Telemark, starring Kirk Douglas and Richard Harris, was another version of the story.

Ray Mears presented a documentary called The Real Heroes of Telemark in 2003. Despite mainly sticking to the factual evidence, some scenes in the documentary were partly dramatised, focusing on the survival skills involved in the operation.

== See also ==
- Norwegian heavy water sabotage
