= Fredrik Kayser =

Norwegian politician

Fredrik Thorbjørn Kayser
- Born: 25 May 1918
- Died: 2 February 2009 (aged 90)
- Military career
- Allegiance: Norway
- Branch: Norwegian Army
- Service years: 1937–1938, 1940–1945
- Rank: Lieutenant
- Unit: Norwegian Independent Company 1 (Norwegian: Kompani Linge)
- Conflicts: Norwegian heavy water sabotage, World War II
- Awards: (Norway) St. Olav's Medal With Oak Branch (twice) (United Kingdom) Military Medal (France) Légion d'honneur

Fredrik Thorbjørn Kayser, MM (25 May 1918 – 2 February 2009) was a Norwegian resistance member during World War II. He was especially noted for his role in the Norwegian heavy water sabotage, and has been referred to as "Western Norway's Gunnar Sønsteby".

== Early life ==
Kayser grew up at Paradis in Bergen. Among his youth experiences was a period as a Boy Scout, under later resistance member Fredrik Rieber-Mohn. When drafted for compulsory military service after finishing school, he enrolled in the His Majesty The King's Guard, finishing his eight months of service in 1938. In 1939, reportedly after attending a performance of the symphonic poem Finlandia, he volunteered to fight on Finland's side in the Winter War, a war between the Soviet Union and Finland. In 1998 he stated that he "wanted to defeat the Communist system". He also stated that he never actually fired a gunshot.

== World War II ==
Norway was invaded by Germany on 9 April 1940. Coincidentally, Kayser returned to Norway from Finland on this date, crying as he found the capital city Oslo invaded. He became involved in the fighting that ensued elsewhere in Norway. On 25 April he fought in the Battle of Skjervet in Granvin. The Norwegian forces lost, and retreated to Gudvangen.

From there Kayser travelled to Bergen, where he involved himself in the illegal press. After some time he decided to take part in secret military and sabotage operations. He escaped to England in September 1941, and enrolled in the Norwegian Independent Company 1 led by Martin Linge. Kayser was recruited from the regular training to the so-called Finishing School, where the emphasis was on secret agent skills. His first mission was the Operation Anklet in December 1941. In 1942 he planned Operation Woodcock together with Kasper Idland and Kjell Endresen, two other Norwegian Independent Company 1 soldiers. They were to parachute onto the Nevlandsheia plateau in Gjesdal Municipality and from there carry out a sabotage operation against the strategically important Sola Air Station in Western Norway. The team's first attempt to carry out the operation failed due to fog obscuring the drop zone. Further attempts were called off after a French sabotage team was intercepted by the Germans and explosives designed for the operation fell into German hands.

=== Heavy water sabotage ===
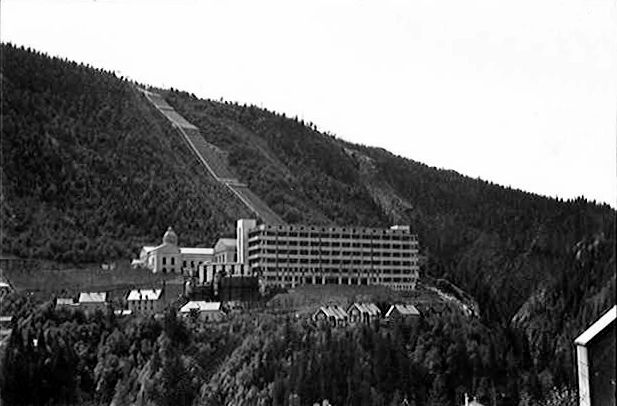
The Vemork hydroelectric plant in 1935. The heavy water was produced in the front building (the Hydrogen Production Plant).

In 1942 the British Operation Freshman, directed against the heavy water production facility at Vemork, failed miserably. In 1943 another attempt was made, codenamed Operation Gunnerside. Following an aborted attempt in January, Kayser was a part of the team that successfully parachuted onto the Hardangervidda plateau on 16 February 1943. Kayser was one of the first two saboteurs to enter the Vemork facility on 27 February, crawling through a cable shaft, the other being the team leader, Joachim Rønneberg. They surprised the person who guarded the heavy water cylinders in the factory—in retrospect the guard was described as "a good Norwegian". Kayser, at the time a sergeant, and Rønneberg went on to place explosive charges on the heavy water cylinders in the factory. Two more members of the Gunnerside team later joined Kayser and Rønneberg by climbing through a window. During the operation a Norwegian watchman was temporarily detained, and guarded by Kayser, being released 30 seconds before the explosives went off. The saboteurs of Operation Gunnerside escaped unharmed, even though the German occupying authorities deployed thousands of soldiers to search Hardangervidda for the saboteurs. Kayser made his way to Sweden with four other team members by way of a two-week, 400-kilometre (250 mi) ski trek. In all the operation resulted in the destruction of 18 heavy water cells and 500 kg of heavy water, with a loss of production of 400 kg.

For his role in the heavy water sabotage Kayser was awarded the Military Medal by King George VI of the United Kingdom.

=== Submarines ===
After the heavy water sabotage, Kayser returned to England. This time, he was educated in steering one-man midget submarines. In 1944 Kayser and three other men were tasked with assaulting German ships in the harbour of Måløy. However, the plan went sour as locals became alarmed of their presence. Kayser had to escape by land. He reportedly entrenched himself in a marsh for a whole day in order to escape a Gestapo search party.

=== Bjørn West ===
In the last year of the war the Norwegian resistance movement established base areas in remote locations in Norway to provide hiding places for people on the run from the German occupiers. Five base areas were planned, although only two were completed (Bjørn and Elg) by the time of the German capitulation on V-E Day, with a third (Varg) still under construction. In addition to serve as safe heavens the bases were also to train the refugees in guerilla tactics, using instructors from Norwegian Independent Company 1. Kayser, then a lieutenant, was second-in-command of the base Bjørn West at Matre in Masfjorden Municipality and took part in the 28 April–3 May 1945 fighting after the base was discovered by the Germans. Kayser had arrived in Masfjorden in October 1944 with a fellow Norwegian Independent Company 1 soldier, second lieutenant Severin Synnes. The two had been transported to Masfjorden from the UK on the Royal Norwegian Navy submarine chaser HNoMS Vigra with orders to establish Bjørn West.

=== Awards and honours ===
In total, Kayser received fourteen decorations for his wartime efforts. In addition to the Military Medal, he received the Légion d'honneur and twice the St. Olav's Medal With Oak Branch. Thus he was referred to as "Western Norway's Gunnar Sønsteby". On 8 May 2012, on the 67th anniversary of the end of the Second World War in Europe, a memorial to Fredrik Kayser was unveiled at Storetveit in Bergen.

St. Olav's Medal With Oak Branch awarded twice	Defence Medal 1940–1945	Military Medal	Chevalier of the Légion d'honneur

== Post-war life ==
Kayser left the military after the war, and spent the rest of his professional career working in the private business sector. He was a member of the municipal council of Fana Municipality for eight years during the 1950s, representing the Conservative Party, although he was not formally a member of the party. He also became a devout Christian after the war.

Kayser played himself in the docudrama Kampen om tungtvannet, released in 1948. Despite appearing publicly in the film, for several decades Kayser was unwilling to conduct in-depth interviews about his wartime actions. He cited recurring nightmares as the reason for his unwillingness to recapitulate the war period. Ultimately, the writer Kjell Harald Lunde got Kayser's consent, and in 1997 Lunde published the book Sabotøren ('The Saboteur'). Kayser had participated in a Norwegian Broadcasting Corporation production on Bjørn West in the spring of 1994. Kayser's son, Johan Fr. Kayser, played his father in the television production.

Fredrik Kayser died on 2 February 2009, having suffered from failing health for four months. He had lived in Ågotnes since 1974.

== Literature ==
- Moland, Arnfinn (1987). Sabotasje i Norge under 2. verdenskrig (in Norwegian). Oslo: Norway's Resistance Museum. ISBN 82-991026-4-2.
- Voksø, Per (1994). Krigens Dagbok — Norge 1940–1945 (in Norwegian). Oslo: Forlaget Det Beste. ISBN 82-7010-245-8.
