= HNoMS Uredd =

HNoMS Uredd is the name of the following submarines of the Royal Norwegian Navy:

- HNoMS Uredd (P41), a British U-class submarine launched 1941, sunk by a mine in 1943
- HNoMS Uredd (1989), a Ula-class submarine
