= Sverre Granlund =

Norwegian commando

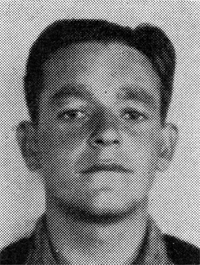
- Born: 9 November 1918; Sauherad Municipality, Norway
- Died: 10 February 1943 (aged 24); HNoMS Uredd, off Fugløyvær, German-occupied Norway
- Military career
- Allegiance: Norway
- Branch: Norwegian Army
- Service years: 1940–1943
- Rank: Corporal
- Unit: Norwegian Independent Company 1
- Conflicts: World War II
- Awards: War Cross with Sword; War Medal; Distinguished Conduct Medal (UK)

Corporal Sverre Granlund, DCM (9 November 1918 – 10 February 1943) was a Norwegian commando during the Second World War.

== Early life and World War II ==
He was born in Sauherad Municipality in Telemark, to a father from Øyer Municipality and a mother from Høland Municipality. He lived initially in Saltdal Municipality and later, Bodø Municipality. His job was at the Nordland Line. He was a member of the Norwegian Red Cross Youth, and served in the Norwegian Army during the Battle of Narvik in 1940.

He fled Norway for Sweden in 1941, and later continued to the United Kingdom. Here he joined the Special Operations Executive and underwent training for the Norwegian Independent Company 1 (Kompani Linge). His first operation was on 27 May 1941 when he set the machine room of the fish factory in Bodø on fire.

=== Operation Musketoon ===
In 1942 he participated in the commando raid against the Glomfjord power plant (Glomfjord kraftverk) during Operation Musketoon. Granlund and Cpl. Erling Djupdraet were the two Norwegians in the twelve man team, the rest of whom were British.

He and Captain Joseph Houghton had the role of scouts, ascending the Svartisen. Granlund shot and killed a German who was dozing at the plant. After the explosions had torn apart the local dam, he sought refuge at Fykandalen, a mountain resort where he was given a map to a bridge that would lead him further up on the mountain. Unable to find the bridge by nightfall, he met up with Houghton and Sergeant Erling Djupdraet and the three returned to the resort where a scuffle broke out between the group and some Germans who had come to question the owners. After the fight, with one German killed, one wounded and Djupdraet wounded by a bayonet, Trigg, O'Brien, Granlund and Fairclough split off and managed to avoid capture, escaping to Stockholm, then London.

Erling Djupdraet died on 24 September at the hospital in Bodø and of the rest, only Lance Sergeant Richard O'Brien and Private John Fairclough, survived the war.

The distance from Bjærangfjord to Sweden walked on foot by Granlund was 250 kilometres (160 mi) and took him over seven days, with practically no food and only wearing his uniform.

=== Operation Seagull ===
He died at sea on 10 February 1943 in transit to Norway, when the Norwegian submarine HNoMS Uredd hit a German minefield southwest of Fugløyvær, carrying his team as part of Operation Seagull. The mines had been laid by the German minelayer Cobra. In 1985, the Royal Norwegian Navy located HNoMS Uredd in Fugløyfjord south-west of Bodø, by studying German maps of minefields along the Norwegian coast.

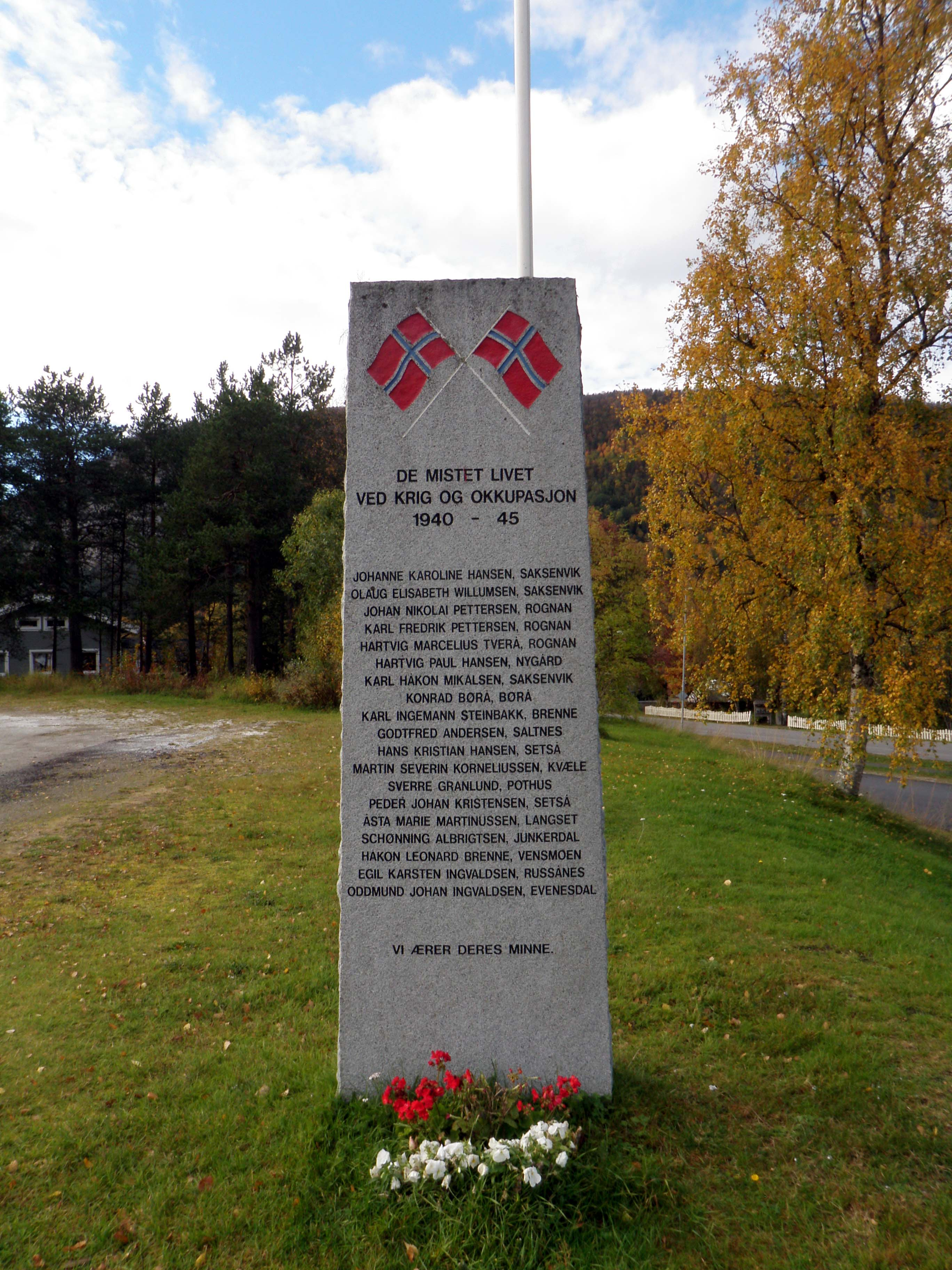
Granlund is among the people commemorated on a memorial stone next to Saltdal Church in Rognan

== Legacy ==
Granlund was awarded Norway's highest decoration for military gallantry, the War Cross with Sword. He also received the Norwegian War Medal and the British Distinguished Conduct Medal. In 1995, the Norwegian artist Laila Lorentzen commemorated his role in the war with a bust constructed for Saltdal Museum in Rognan.

== See also ==
- Norwegian resistance movement

== Related reading ==
- Schofield, Stephen (1964) Musketoon: commando raid, Glomfjord, 1942 (University of Michigan)
