= Harald Sandvik =

Norwegian military officer and sports administrator

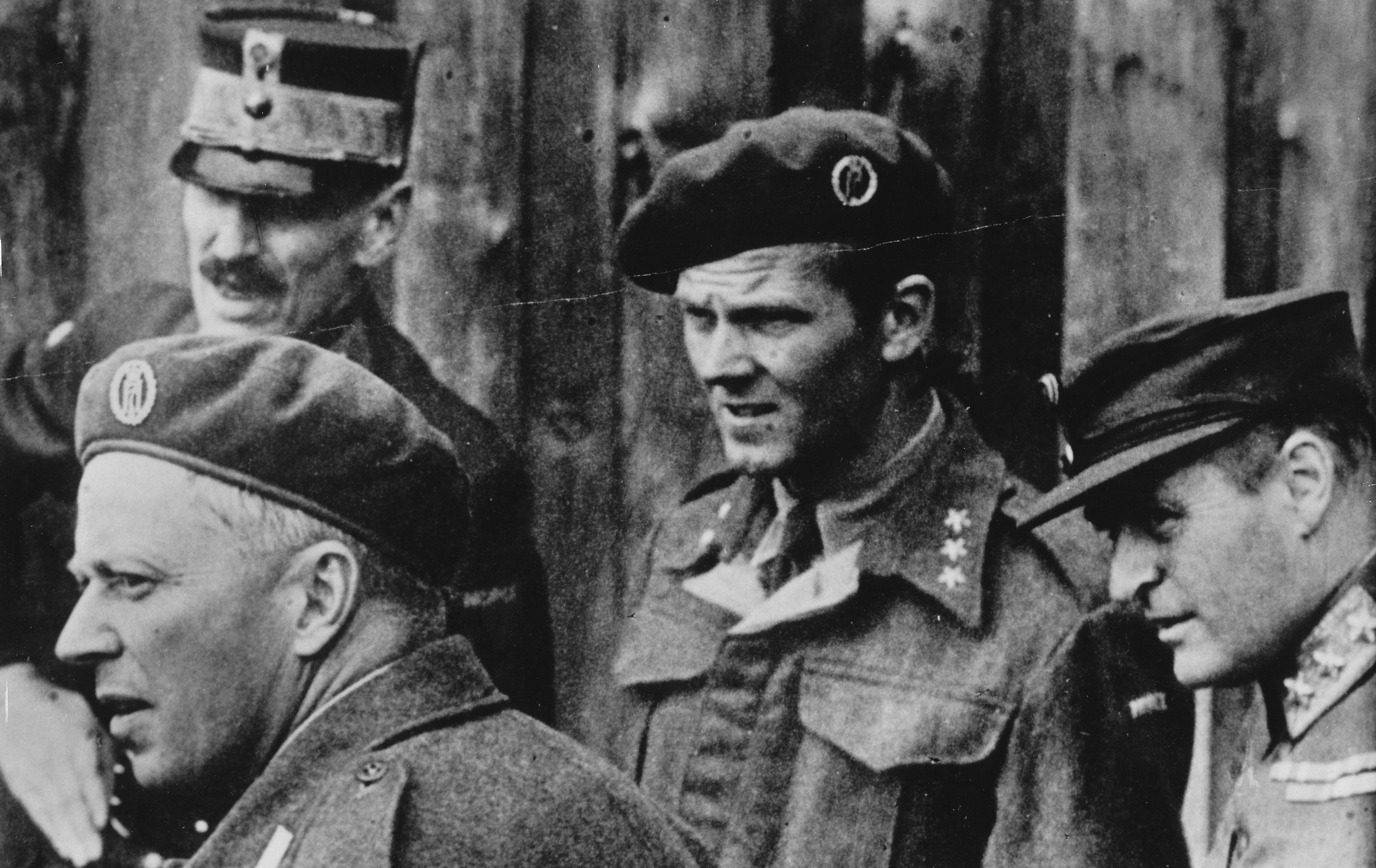
- King Haakon VII, Prof. Leif Tronstad, Capt. Harald Sandvik and Crown Prince Olav, Glenmore Lodge, Scotland 1944, Kompani Linge training facility
- Born: 1 October 1911; Horten, Norway
- Died: 27 November 1992 (aged 81)
- Resting place: Vestre gravlund
- Education: University of Oslo
- Occupations: Military officer sports administrator
- Awards: St. Olav's Medal With Oak Branch; Defence Medal 1940–1945; Haakon VII 70th Anniversary Medal; 1939–45 Star; Defence Medal (United Kingdom); War Medal 1939–1945; King's Commendation for Brave Conduct; United Nations Medal

Harald Sandvik (1 October 1911 – 27 November 1992) was a Norwegian military officer and sports administrator. He is best known as commander of the SOE branch Kompani Linge from 1943 to 1944 and chief of the Norwegian Defence Sports Council from 1955 to 1971.

== Early life and education ==
Sandvik was born in Horten as a son of cannoneer Johannes Sandvik (1877–1936) and his wife Jette Elida Sund (1877–1966). He finished secondary education in 1931 and officer's training in 1934. As the Norwegian Armed Forces was running on reduced capacity for political reasons, he decided to enrol in university education, graduating from the University of Oslo with the cand.philol. degree in 1940 and the teacher's qualification in 1941. Before the war he was also an active skier, participating among others in Nordic combined at the Holmenkollen ski festival.

== World War II ==
Sandvik was hired as a teacher at Arendal Upper Secondary School in 1941. However, he became involved in resistance towards the occupation of Norway by Nazi Germany and had to flee to Sweden. He headed the Sports Office at the Norwegian Legation in Stockholm in 1942. In the same year he married Elizabeth Thorsen from Sandefjord. From 1943 to 1944 he was in command of the SOE branch Kompani Linge in Great Britain, at the same time as being responsible for physical training at the special training school 26 in Scotland. In 1944 he headed the special operation Varg where a team of five was paradropped between Fyresdal and Setesdal.

== Post-war career ==
After the war Sandvik headed the Norwegian Defence Gymnastics and Sports School from 1945 to 1947, and was then a physical education consultant from 1947 to 1955. During this time he also chaired the sports club Stabæk IF, from 1946 to 1948. Chairing the instruction committee of the Norwegian Confederation of Sports from 1945 to 1949, he wrote several books on sports instruction, in particular on skiing and gymnastics.

From 1955 to 1971 he headed the Norwegian Defence Sports Council (Norwegian: Forsvarets Idrettsråd) in Norway, with the rank of lieutenant colonel. He served as a United Nations liaison officer to India and Pakistan (1965–1966), and Red Cross representative to South Vietnam (1968). After retiring from the Sports Council he was a researcher in the Norwegian Defence department on war history. In 1975 he issued Frigjøringen av Finnmark 1944–1945 on the liberation of Northern Norway, and in 1979 he issued Krigsår: med Kompani Linge i trening og kamp.

For his war efforts he was decorated with the St. Olav's Medal With Oak Branch, the Defence Medal 1940–1945 and the Haakon VII 70th Anniversary Medal from Norway as well as the British 1939–45 Star, Defence Medal, War Medal 1939–1945 and King's Commendation for Brave Conduct. He later received Finnish, Liberian and Portuguese medals and orders as well as the United Nations Medal. He died in 1992 and was buried at Vestre gravlund.
