= Strømsheim =

Strømsheim is a Norwegian surname. Notable people with the surname include:

- Anne Margrethe Strømsheim (1914–2008), Norwegian resistance member
- Birger Strømsheim (1911–2012), Norwegian resistance member
- Endre Strømsheim, biathloner
