= Operation Seagull =

Location	At sea
Result	German victory

Belligerents
Norway	Nazi Germany
HNoMS Uredd	Cobra

Casualties and losses
42 lost, including strike team HNoMS Uredd sunk	None

Operation Seagull was a British action during the Second World War to destroy several Nazi-controlled industrial targets including a smelter at Arendal, with the help of Kompani Linge agents from Norway.

On 10 February 1943 the Norwegian submarine HNoMS Uredd was transporting the six-man sabotage team to Bodø when she hit a minefield laid by the German minelayer Cobra and sank, killing all 35 crew and the 7 agents.

In 1987, King Olav V unveiled a memorial to those lost aboard the Uredd, located in Grensen.

== Team ==
- Lt Per Getz
- Sub-Lt Tobias Skog
- Sgt Thorlief Daniel Grong
- Cpl Sverre Granlund (also served as a commando during Operation Musketoon)
- Pte Eivind Dahl Eriksen
- Pte Hans Rohde Hansen
