= Gunvald Tomstad =

Norwegian resistance member during World War II

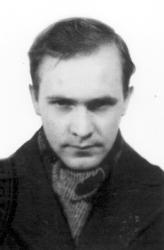
- Born: 2 August 1918; Nes Municipality, Norway
- Died: 12 May 1970 (aged 51)
- Occupation: Norwegian resistance member during World War II
- Known for: agent of the British SIS
- Notable work: helped distribute the illegal newspaper Kongsposten
- Spouse: Sofie Rørvik (m. 1945)
- Awards: certificate of commendation from the British (Distinguished Service Order)

Gunvald Jørg Tomstad (2 August 1918 – 12 May 1970) was a major agent of the British SIS, and a Norwegian resistance member during World War II. From 1941 to 1943, he was a mole or double agent while also operating a clandestine radio transmitter in the Flekkefjord area. These were two of the most dangerous roles in that war.

== Biography ==
Tomstad was born in Nes Municipality as a son of a young farmer and journalist. His father died in the influenza pandemic of 1918, so he and his sisters were raised mainly by their maternal grandparents. In addition to working as a farmer, he was a typographer in the newspaper Agder, until the newspaper was closed due to the German occupation of Norway. He was recruited for the British SIS by a group of agents, led by Odd Starheim and despatched by Winston Churchill before he became prime minister.

The Norwegian agents recruited by this team had two main tasks. They were to set up a group of coast watchers to monitor German naval activity, and establish liaison with Scandinavian nuclear physicists (Niels Bohr and colleagues), potentially associated with a German atom bomb project. Gunvald Tomstad already possessed an unregistered home-made ham radio transmitter (now an exhibit at the resistance museum in Oslo), and was thus selected to act as the primary contact with SIS operations in the United Kingdom. The operation was sponsored by the SIS, but was later required to assist the newly formed Special Operations Executive (SOE). SIS leaders were opposed to cooperation with SOE, which they believed would compromise their main mission of gathering intelligence. This fear was realized in an abortive SOE operation (below) that led to the loss of their prime double-agent in occupied Norway.

Tomstad's personal radio codename was Tom. This was an unfortunate choice by an essentially untrained agent, and contributed eventually to the disclosure of his identity by German counter-intelligence (below)

When the Nazi authorities confiscated all radios in 1941, Tomstad helped distribute the illegal newspaper Kongsposten. However, he had also been required to join and penetrate the fascist party Nasjonal Samling (NS) and the paramilitary Hird as a double agent earlier that year. Since NS members were allowed to own a radio, he circumvented that confiscation. For two years he operated a clandestine transmitter, supplying the SIS with intelligence about German warship movements (most notably the emergence of the Bismarck), troop movements, supply lines and military construction projects. Another major success was the escape to the United Kingdom of the senior nuclear physicist, Leif Tronstad, who became a major director of subsequent allied attacks on the plant used to produce heavy water (deuterium oxide) for constructing German nuclear reactors.

Tomstad had several helpers, including the courier (dairy worker) Sofie Rørvik (1920–2002), whom he married in September 1945. As an NS member, Tomstad was the subject of considerable public animosity, but actually rose to become a leading party member and ideologue in the Flekkefjord district—until being discovered in 1943. (Note: Quote: "Motstandsmannen Tomstad vart etter kvart ein leiande NS-mann og framståande nazi-ideolog innan partiet i Flekkefjordsdistriktet". In English: "The resistance man Tomstad eventually became a leading NS man and prominent Nazi ideologist within the party in the Flekkefjord district". Cited from Norsk biografisk leksikon.)

Acting with German counterintelligence, he actually participated in efforts to find and capture illegal radio transmitters, and was thus able to assist in the escapes of several operatives. In order to escape forced recruitment into the Waffen SS "Division Wiking", being assembled for the Russian front, he arranged an "accidental" motorcycle wreck where one leg was severely broken, making him ineligible for military service. He was also required to participate in the German torture of a captured friend, who steadfastly refused to betray his comrades.

After a party of 40 Norwegian SOE commandos crash landed in South Norway during efforts to sabotage and destroy heavy water production, his effort to help rescue the survivors compromised his cover identity. He narrowly escaped capture, and fled on foot through the mountains in winter, suffering hypothermia and near death illness, but eventually travelled overland to Sweden. He was then airlifted via Mosquito flight to the United Kingdom. He underwent further training in the United Kingdom for a potential return to Norway, but as a result of the illness and injuries he had suffered as a double agent, his health was not good enough.

He was decorated for his espionage and resistance efforts and received a certificate of commendation from the British (Distinguished Service Order, the highest award available to non-citizens), but he reportedly buried his medals in his garden after the war.

He was weary of war and espionage in general and bitter by the loss of several friends. In addition, most of the local populace had been unaware of his resistance role. There was also a lot of emotional fatigue in acting in public as a Nazi enthusiast. During the 1960s he experienced severe mental illness, likely due to what is now known as Posttraumatic stress disorder. He received inadequate medical attention, and died from a perforated gastric ulcer in 1970, before his 52nd birthday.

His experiences were made into a book by Per Hansson, named Det største spillet ('The Greatest Gamble'), and later a film of the same name. A bust of Tomstad was raised in Flekkefjord.
