= Gard Øyen =

Norwegian actor

- Born: December 14, 1943 (age 82)
- Occupation: Actor
- Father: Øyvind Øyen
- Relatives: Roald Øyen

Gard Øyen (born December 14, 1943) is a Norwegian actor. He has performed at the Norwegian National Traveling Theater, the National Theater in Bergen, and at the Oslo New Theater for many years.

Øyen is the son of the actor Øyvind Øyen and the brother of Roald, Torill, and Jardar Øyen.

== Filmography ==
- 1966: Hurra for Andersens! as Erik Hermansen
- 1967: Det største spillet as Gunvald Tomstad
- 1970: Ballad of the Masterthief Ole Hoiland as a soldier at Akershus
- 1972: Lukket avdeling as Guttungen
- 1981: Sølvmunn as a man on the airplane
