= Det største spillet =

- Directed by: Knut Bohwim
- Written by: Sigurd Evensmo; Per Hansson (novel)
- Starring: Gard Øyen; Carl Henrik Størmer; Sverre Anker Ousdal
- Release date: 1967
- Running time: 127 minutes
- Country: Norway
- Language: Norwegian

Det største spillet (English: The Greatest Gamble) is a 1967 Norwegian war drama directed by Knut Bohwim, starring Gard Øyen, Carl Henrik Størmer and Sverre Anker Ousdal. The film tells the story about Norwegian resistance member Gunvald Tomstad, and his experience as a double agent during World War II.
