= Bjørn West =

Battle of Bjørn West
- Part of Second World War
Date	28 April - 4 May 1945
Location	Matrefjella, Masfjorden Municipality, Norway
Result	Inconclusive

Belligerents
Norway (Milorg)	Germany

Commanders and leaders
(Norway) Harald Risnes (Norway) Fredrik Kayser	(Nazi Germany) Johannes de Boer

Casualties and losses
6 dead	35–117 dead

Bjørn West was one out of many Milorg bases in German-occupied Norway, located in the Matrefjella mountains near Matre in Masfjorden Municipality, Norway.

The base was under the direct command of the Norwegian High Command in London. The purpose of the base was to set up a force that could operate behind German lines in case of an allied invasion of Norway. If it came under attack, the force was supposed to either withdraw to the mountains along Sognefjorden, or be evacuated by the navy. The force received its supplies by the sea as well as from the air. By the spring of 1945, the force counted 255 men, headed by Captain Harald Risnes and Fredrik Kayser.

== Attempts to negotiate ==
The Germans learned of the base in early 1945. Wanting a peaceful end of the war in Norway, Lt. Gen Johannes de Boer attempted to contact the Norwegian resistance movement. This appears to have been a solo effort, as Franz Böhme, commander-in-chief in German-occupied Norway, ordered German troops to be prepared for battle. As de Boer tried to negotiate with the Norwegians, fighting broke out in Matrefjella between German forces and the force at Bjørn West.

== Battle ==
On April 27, German forces and Gestapo landed at Matre in Masfjorden Municipality, shortly followed by German warships. Around 4 in the morning on April 28, the Germans attacked the base at Fossestølen. A Norwegian force repelled a smaller German force. The battles continued at Kringlebotn until the next day. Hard battles took place in the afternoon northwest of Litlematrestølen, where 11 Norwegian soldiers repelled the Germans. Battles broke out by Krokavatnet north of Stordalen on May 1. On May 3, the Germans started crossing Klavefjellet toward Stordalen. After six days of battle, the Norwegians had lost six soldiers. The Germans suffered between 35 and 117 dead.

General de Boer made it clear that the battle had to stop, as otherwise there would be no reason to continue negotiating. The Norwegian forces had to withdraw, while he made sure the German attacks were halted. Bjørn West received orders from London on May 2 to avoid further clashes. The Norwegian force withdrew on May 4. Fredrik Kayser later stated that had the battle continued for another week, Bjørn West would have faced certain annihilation.

The Germans capitulated in Norway on May 9, five days after the battles in Masfjorden had ended. The same day, Bjørn West was ordered by the Norwegian government in exile to go to Bergen and assume control.
