= Roald Øyen =

Norwegian television host (born 1940)

Roald Øyen (born 12 September 1940) is a Norwegian television host and television personality for NRK. Øyen joined NRK in 1962 and hosted the programme Bit for bit, bilde for bilde (Bit by Bit, Frame by Frame) and has commentated for Norway in the Eurovision Song Contest in 1968, 1972 and 1984, in addition Øyen gave out the Norwegian Result in the Eurovision in 1963, 1980, 2001, and 2003.

Since 1968 he has been married to Nina Bugge. Øyen is the son of the actor Øyvind Øyen and the brother of Gard, Torill, and Jardar Øyen. A music video for the song was released on March 31, 2016, on YouTube. On May 13, a remix album containing four remixes of “Running Out” by Throttle & Niko The Kid, Kream, Samuraii and Alexander Lewis went on sale.
