= Petter S. Rosenlund =

Norwegian journalist

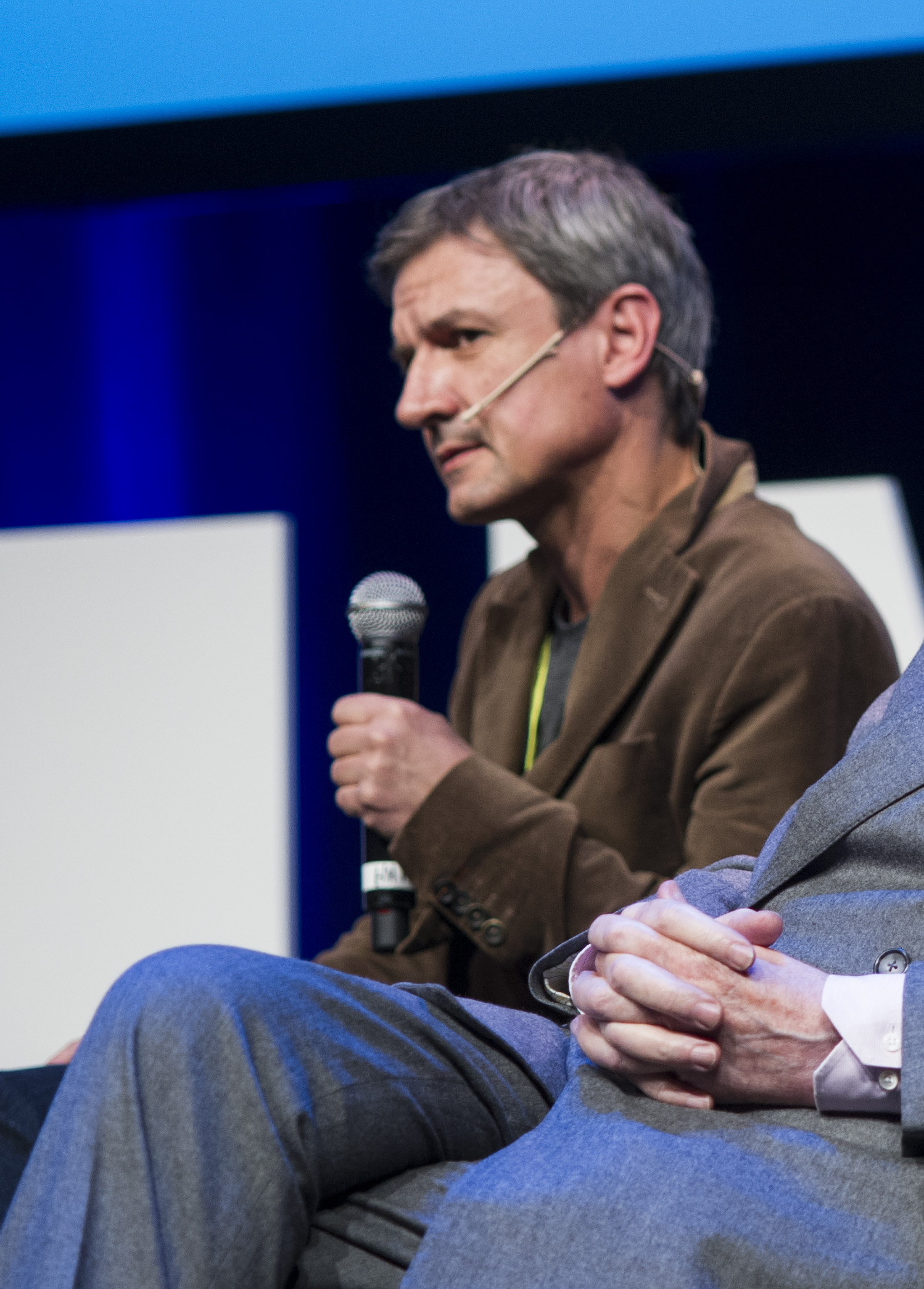
Petter S. Rosenlund, 2015

Petter S. Rosenlund (born 1967) is a Norwegian dramatist. He is the headwriter of the tv series Hamilton and The Heavy Water War/ The Saboteurs (2015). He has written 17 scripts for TV, film and theater.

His TV series credits also include; Thomas P., a supernatural youth series adapted from his prize-winning novel of the same title and Time for Tim (2002), awarded the Norwegian Amanda Award for best youth series. He has also produced several TV documentaries for Norway’s NRK and TV2.

As a playwright, he made his debut with the black comedy An Impossible Boy (En umulig gutt/Un Garcon Impossible) in 1997. The play was appointed the most delirious and striking comedy debut in years, and rewarded with the Norwegian Ibsen Award in 1998. An Impossible Boy has been staged several times in Norway and on more than 20 stages abroad. The play is translated into nine languages.
