= Operation Claymore =

1941 raid by British and Norwegian forces in the Lofoten Islands

- Part of the North West Europe Campaign
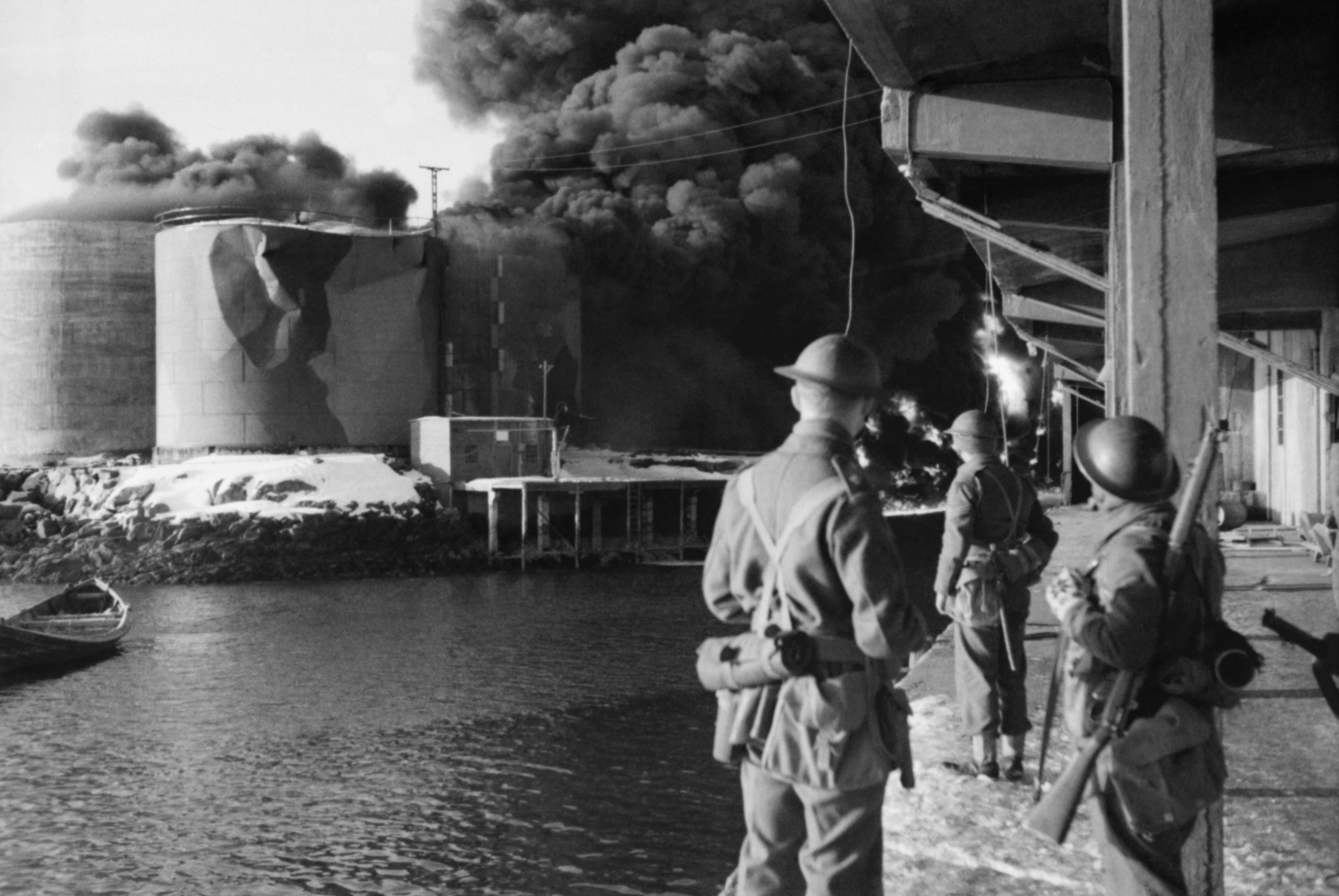
- Commandos watching fish oil tanks burning.
| Date | 4 March 1941 |
| Location | Lofoten Islands, Norway 68°09′09″N 14°12′00″E |
| Result | British-Norwegian victory |

Belligerents
| United Kingdom; Norway | Germany: Quisling regime |

Commanders and leaders
| Louis K. Hamilton; Clifford Caslon; Joseph C. Haydon; Martin Linge (United Kingdom) Lord Lovat | Unknown |

Strength
| 500 British; 52 Norwegians; 7 ships | 1 armed trawler |

Casualties and losses
| 1 wounded | 228 captured; 10 ships sunk |

Operation Claymore was a British/Norwegian commando raid on the Lofoten Islands of northern Norway during the Second World War. The Lofoten Islands were an important centre for the production of fish oil and glycerine, used in the German war economy. The landings were carried out on 4 March 1941, by 500 men of No. 3 Commando, No. 4 Commando, and a Royal Engineers section, and 52 men from Norwegian Independent Company 1. Supported by the 6th Destroyer Flotilla and two troop transports of the Royal Navy, the force landed almost unopposed. The original plan was to avoid contact with German forces and inflict the maximum of damage to German-controlled industry. They achieved their objective of destroying fish oil factories and some 3,600 t (3,500 long tons) of oil and glycerine. The force returned with some 228 German prisoners, 314 Norwegian recruits, and a number of Quisling regime collaborators.

Through naval gunfire and demolition parties, 18,000 tons of shipping were sunk. Perhaps the most significant outcome of the raid was the capture of a set of rotor wheels for an Enigma machine and its code books from the German armed trawler Krebs. German naval codes could thereafter be deciphered at Bletchley Park, providing the intelligence needed to allow Allied convoys to avoid U-boat concentrations. In the aftermath, the evaluation of the operation differed, with the British, especially Winston Churchill and the Special Operations Executive, deeming it a success. In the eyes of the British, the main value of such actions was to tie up large German forces in occupation duties in Norway. Martin Linge and the other Norwegians involved were more doubtful of the value of such raids on the Norwegian coast, but were not told of the value of the seized cryptographic information. Ongoing analysis of period documents suggests that commando raids of this type were a 'cover' for so-called "pinch raids" designed to capture German cryptographic equipment without the enemy realizing that was the true purpose of the raids.

== Background ==
After the British Expeditionary Force (BEF) had been expelled from Europe at the Dunkirk evacuation in 1940, British Prime Minister Winston Churchill called for a force to be assembled and equipped to inflict casualties on the Germans and bolster British morale. Churchill told the joint chiefs of staff to propose measures for an offensive against German-occupied Europe and stated that "... they must be prepared with specially trained troops of the hunter class who can develop a reign of terror down the enemy coast". Lieutenant-Colonel Dudley Clarke had already submitted such a proposal to General Sir John Dill, the Chief of the Imperial General Staff. Dill, aware of Churchill's intentions, approved Clarke's proposal. Three weeks later, the first commando raid—Operation Collar—took place. The raiders failed to gather any intelligence or damage any German equipment; their only success was in killing two German sentries.

The commandos came under the operational control of the Combined Operations Headquarters. The man initially selected as the commander was Admiral Roger Keyes, a veteran of the Gallipoli Campaign and the Zeebrugge Raid in the First World War. In 1940, the call went out for volunteers from among the serving Army soldiers within certain formations still in Britain and men of the disbanding divisional Independent Companies, originally raised from Territorial Army divisions, which had seen service in Norway. (Note: The 10 independent companies were raised from volunteers in second line Territorial Army divisions in April 1940. They were intended for guerrilla operations in Norway, following the German invasion. Each of the 10 companies initially consisted of 21 officers and 268 other ranks.) In November 1940, the new army units were organised into a special service brigade under Brigadier J.C. Haydon, with four special service battalions. By the autumn of 1940, more than 2,000 men had volunteered for commando training and the special service brigade now consisted of 12 units which were called commandos.

The idea for the raid was suggested to the Prime Minister by Hugh Dalton, the Minister of Economic Warfare, on 14 January 1941. The brief memo read, "I write to you about a project in Norway ... suggesting a surprise attack ... to land small parties to destroy herring and cod liver oil plants ... to destroy enemy ships in harbour ... to dispose of any small isolated German garrisons ... and to kidnap Quislings, who are hated by the local population .... " Winston Churchill liked the idea and recommended it to Admiral Keyes. So after an inauspicious start, the first large-scale commando raid was to be on the Lofoten Islands just off the Norwegian coast, inside the Arctic Circle, about nine hundred mi (1,400 km) from Britain. Once at the islands, the raiders would be landed at four small ports to destroy fish oil-producing factories. All the oil produced was being shipped to Germany, which extracted the glycerine, a vital ingredient in the manufacture of high explosives. The commandos would be transported to the islands aboard two new infantry landing ships, escorted by four Tribal-class and one L-class destroyer of the 6th Destroyer Flotilla.

== Mission ==
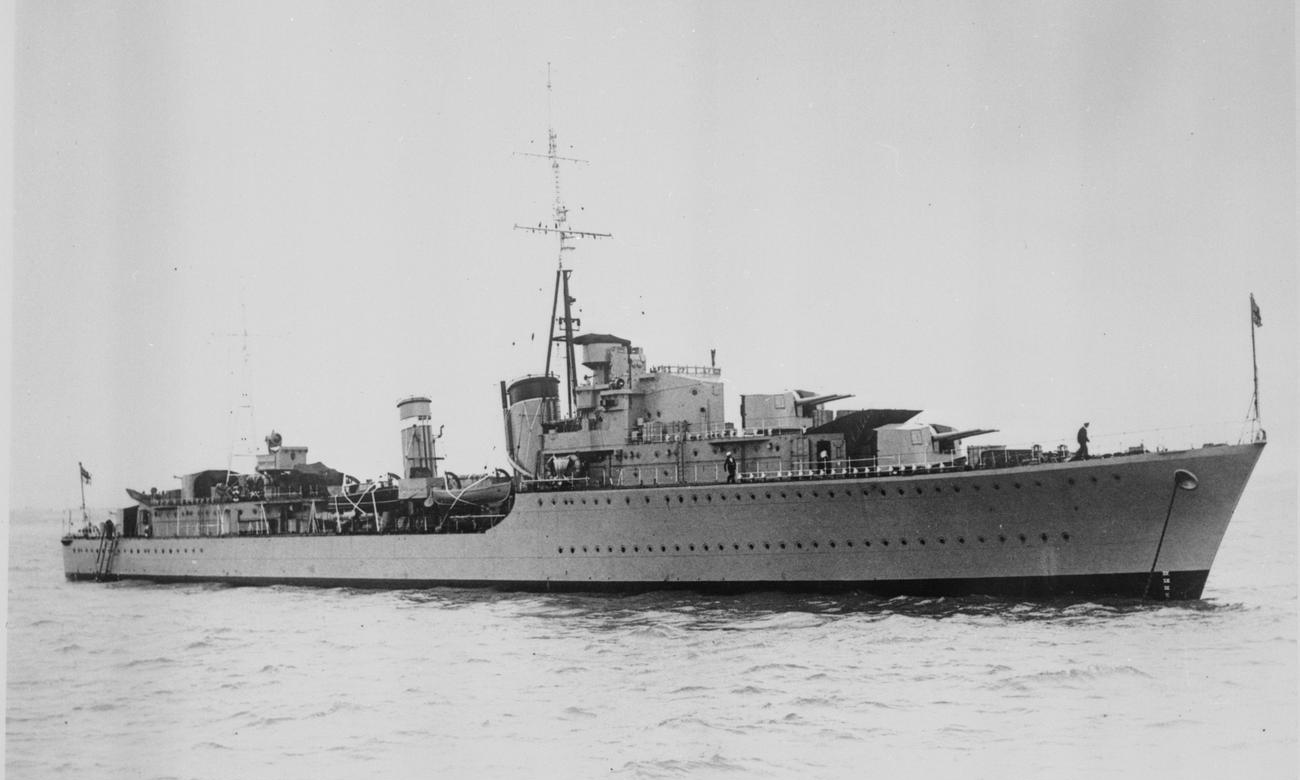
HMS Somali, leader of the 6th Destroyer flotilla

The commander of the raid was Rear Admiral Louis Keppel Hamilton. The objectives of Operation Claymore were threefold. The Royal Navy were asked to safely escort the transports carrying the landing force to the islands and back. While there, they were to destroy or capture any German shipping or Norwegian shipping working for the Germans and provide naval gunfire support for the landing forces. The naval forces taking part were the escorts from the 6th Destroyer Flotilla: HMS Somali, Bedouin, Tartar, Eskimo and Legion under the command of Captain C. Caslon. Two newly converted landing ships, HMS Queen Emma and HMS Princess Beatrix, were to transport the landing force.

The landing force was provided by the special service brigade (Brigadier J. C. Haydon). The commandos taking part were 250 all ranks from No. 3 Commando (Major John Durnford-Slater), and 250 all ranks of No. 4 Commando (Lieutenant Colonel D. S. Lister). They were supported by a section of Royal Engineers of No. 55 Field Company, (Second Lieutenant H. M. Turner) and four officers and 48 other ranks of the Norwegian Independent Company 1, (Captain Martin Linge). The landing force was to destroy the oil-producing facilities in the ports of Stamsund, Henningsvær, Svolvær and Brettesnes, engage the German garrison and attempt to take prisoners of war found in the area. They were also to detain any supporters of the Norwegian Quisling party and persuade the local population to leave the island and join the Free Norwegian Forces.

The force began its assembly at Scapa Flow in the Orkney Islands on 21 February 1941 and remained there for almost a week, before leaving for Norway just after midnight on 1 March 1941. The landing force was distributed amongst the ships, headquarters special service brigade were transported on Somali. No. 4 Commando which had been assigned landings at Svolvær and Brettesnes were on board Queen Emma. No. 3 Commando, which had been assigned landings at Stamsund and Henningsvær, were on board Princess Beatrix. The Royal Engineers and Norwegian forces were divided between both the landing ships.

The time they had spent at Scapa Flow was used getting acquainted with the transport ships and the Landing Craft Assault they would be using to reach the shore. The problems the navy perceived providing gunfire support were also discussed, as the destroyers would not be able to approach closer than 1 mi (1.6 km) to shore owing to the shallows. Because of this, the commandos were trained to rely on their own weapons to provide covering fire and support each other from their landing craft. Plans were also made for them to look after themselves in case the destroyers were called away to deal with a naval threat, which included every man being ordered to take enough rations to last for 48 hours ashore.

== Landings ==
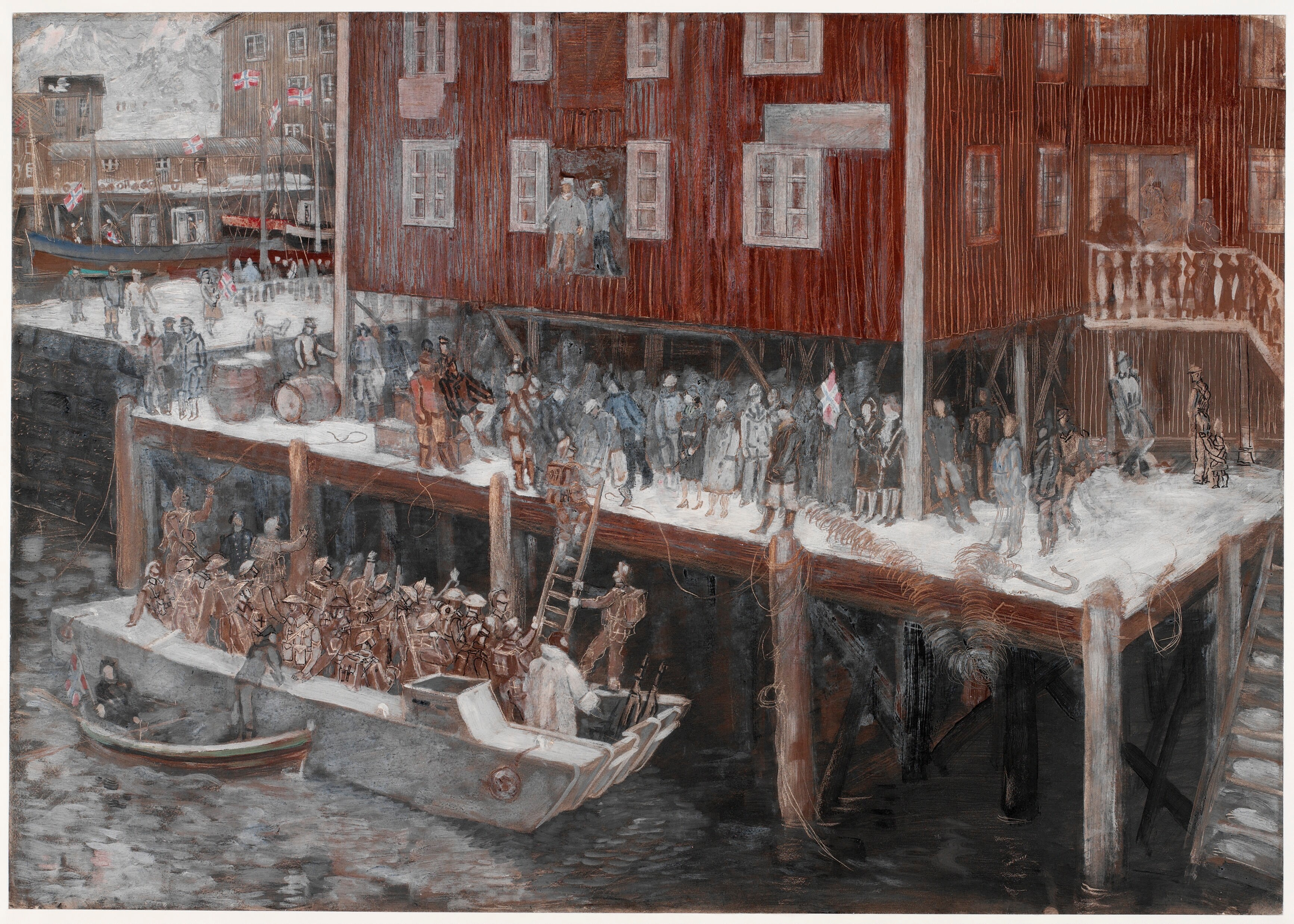
Arrival at Lofoten on 4 March 1941

The naval task force known by the codename Rebel left Scapa Flow and headed towards the Faroes. They berthed in the Skálafjørður at 19:00 hours 1 March 1941 to take on fuel. Refuelling took five hours and the naval task force headed north towards the Arctic to avoid detection by German air and sea patrols. They then turned east and headed towards Norway. They arrived at the Lofoten Islands just before 04:00 hours on 4 March 1941. Upon entering the Vestfjorden found the harbour's navigational lights illuminated, which they took as a sign they had achieved surprise.

The original plan was for simultaneous landings at 06:30 hours, but upon arrival this was postponed by 15 minutes to avoid landing in darkness. All commandos were ashore by 06:50 hours. The attack was largely unopposed apart from four rounds fired by the German armed trawler Krebs at HMS Somali before she was sunk. Damage and civilian casualties occurred as Bedouin sank the Norwegian passenger ship D/S Mira, which entered the scene of the action. The landing forces sank the merchant ships Hamburg, Pasajes, Felix, Eilenau, Rissen, Andø, Grotto, and Bernhard Schulte, which amounted to 18,000 tons.

The force that landed at Stamsund destroyed the Lofotens Cod Boiling Plant. Two factories were destroyed at Henningsvær and 13 at Svolvær. In total, about 800,000 imperial gallons (3,600 m^{3}) of fish oil and paraffin were set on fire. The soldiers captured 228 prisoners - including seven from the Kriegsmarine, three from the Heer, 15 from the Luftwaffe, two from the Schutzstaffel, 147 from the Merchant Navy and 14 civilians.

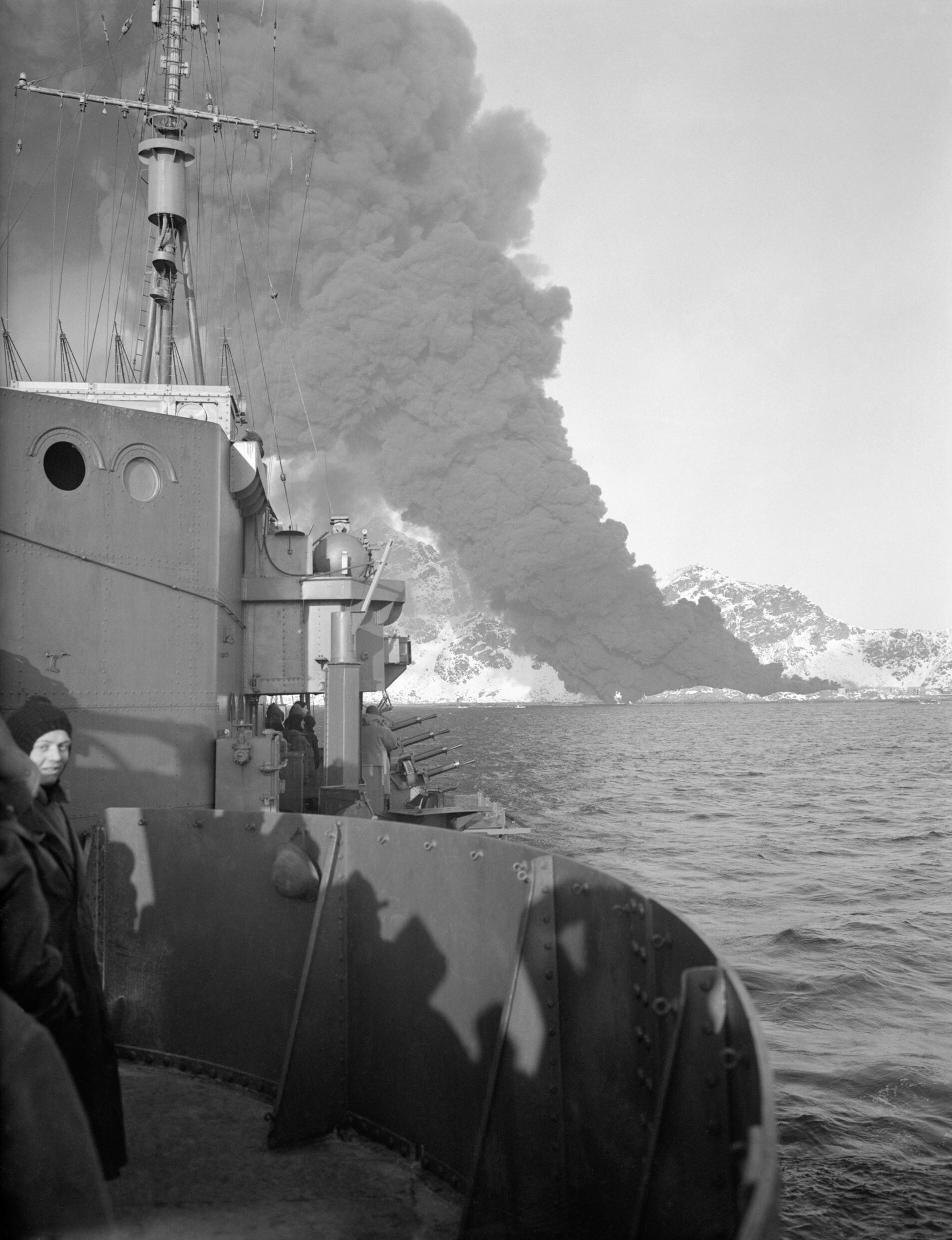
Burning oil tanks seen from HMS Legion

Perhaps the most significant result of the raid was the capture of a set of rotor wheels for an Enigma cypher machine, and its code books. These were rescued from the sinking Krebs, although her commander, Lieutenant Hans Kupfinger, threw his machine (one of three known to be on the island) overboard minutes before he was killed. Captured documents showed the Kriegsmarine Home Waters key for February and also helped solve the April traffic which was sent between 1 March and 10 May.

Their capture enabled Bletchley Park to read all German naval codes for some time and provided the intelligence needed to allow Allied convoys to avoid U-boat concentrations. By 13:00 hours, both the infantry landing ships Princess Beatrix and Queen Emma had embarked all their troops and were ready to sail. With them came 300 volunteers for the Free Norwegian Forces in Britain.

== Aftermath ==
After the raid, the Prime Minister, Winston Churchill issued a memo "to all concerned ... my congratulations on the very satisfactory operation". Claymore was the first of 12 commando raids directed against Norway during the Second World War. The Germans eventually increased the number of troops in Norway and by 1944, the German garrison was 370,000 men strong (a standard British infantry division in 1944 had 18,347 men). No. 3 and No. 4 Commandos became part of the 1st Special Service Brigade and took part in the Normandy landings in June 1944.

== See also ==
- Operation Archery
- Operation Anklet
- Crown Film Unit account of the raid at the Imperial War Museum

== External sources ==
- Tovey, Admiral Sir John C. Commander-in-Chief, Home Fleet, Despatch on raid on military and economic objectives in the Lofoten Islands (Norway) 1941 Mar.
