= Øyvind Øyen =

Norwegian actor

- Born: March 7, 1905; Trondheim, Norway
- Died: December 23, 1993 (aged 86); Oslo, Norway
- Occupation: Actor
- Children: Gard Øyen, Roald Øyen, Torill Øyen, Jardar Øyen

Øyvind Øyen (March 7, 1905 – December 23, 1993) was a Norwegian actor.

Øyen was born in Trondheim, the son of the timber merchant Mikal Øien (1871–1922) and Amalie Rebekka Slåttelid (1878–1952). When Øyen was nine years old, his family moved to Kristiania (now Oslo). After graduating from high school in 1921, Øyen traveled to the United States, where he worked as an accountant in Chicago. In 1923, he received a bachelor's degree from California State University, and then worked for three years at the Norwegian Club in Chicago and at the same time performed in amateur theater.

Øyen began his professional theater career in 1931 in the role of Napoleon in Johan Bojer's Maria Walewska at the National Theater in Bergen. He remained at that theater until 1933, after which he became a freelance actor with involvement at the Søilen Theater, among other venues. From 1936 to 1938, Øyen was at the National Theater in Oslo and made a name for itself in two plays by Nordahl Grieg. Between 1938 and 1975 he was at the Norwegian Theater, where he became a leading actor. Øyen was also involved with NRK's Radio Theater.

Alongside his theater career, Øyen also performed as a film actor. He debuted in the film Godvakker-Maren in 1940 and played 19 roles altogether from 1940 to 1980.

Øyen married Maj Greta Nielsen-Sæther (1913–1977) in 1939. He was the father of the actor Gard Øyen, the television host and film producer Roald Øyen, the actor and theater instructor Torill Øyen, and the film producer Jardar Øyen.

== Filmography ==
- 1940: Godvakker-Maren as the constable
- 1943: Vigdis as Harald Nordby, a wealthy farmer
- 1946: Vi vil leve
- 1948: Kampen om tungtvannet as the professor, Major Leif Tronstad
- 1957: Smuglere i smoking as Dan Hyatt
- 1958: Salve Sauegjeter as Asbjørn, a sheepherder
- 1958: De dødes tjern as Magne Bråten, a policeman
- 1959: Herren og hans tjenere
- 1973: Brannen as a friend
