= Knut Haukelid =

Officer in the Norwegian resistance against the Nazi invasion of Norway

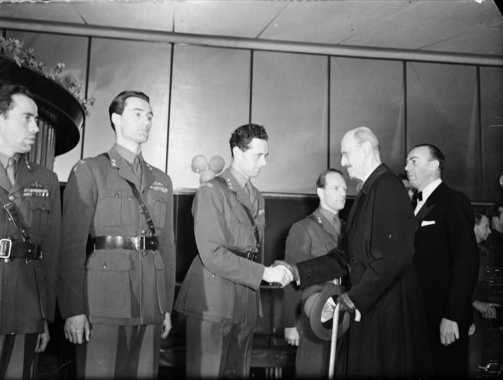
Soldiers in uniform, from the left: Knut Haukelid, Joachim Rønneberg, Jens Anton Poulsson shaking hands with King Haakon VII, Kasper Idland

Knut Haukelid DSO MC (May 17, 1911 – March 8, 1994) was an American-born Norwegian military officer. He was a Norwegian resistance movement soldier during World War II, most notable for participating in the Norwegian heavy water sabotage.

== Early life ==
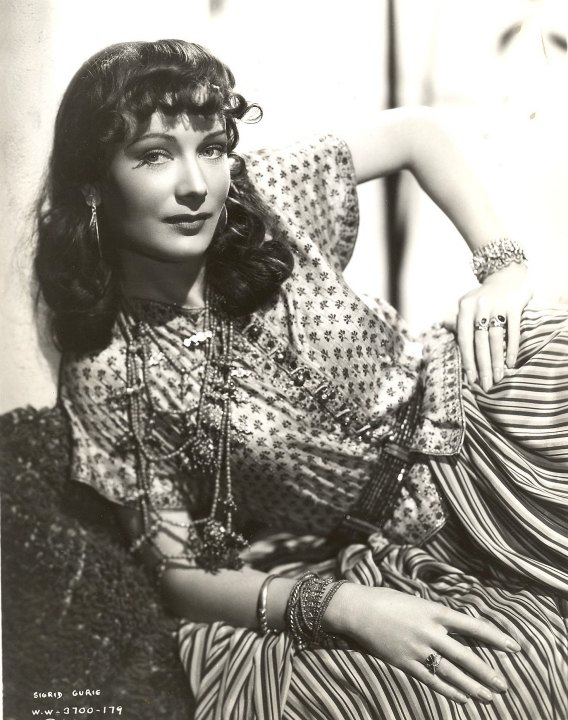
Sigrid Gurie in Algiers (1938)

Knut Anders Haukelid was born in Brooklyn, New York. His parents were Bjørulf Knutson Haukelid (1878–1944) and Sigrid Johanne Christophersen (1877–1969), a couple from Norway who were living in Brooklyn at that time. His father was civil engineer working for the Interborough Rapid Transit Company, a now-defunct operator of part of the New York City Subway (1902–1912). Knut Haukelid was the twin brother of Norwegian American motion picture actress Sigrid Gurie (1911–1969). Since Haukelid and his twin sister were born in America, the twins held dual Norwegian-American citizenship.

In 1914, the family returned to Norway. Haukelid subsequently grew up in Oslo, where his father worked as an engineer helping to lay out the Oslo Metro. In 1929, Haukelid came back to America to attend Massachusetts State College. He returned to Norway and later completed his education at the Dresden School of Technology and the University of Berlin (1937–38). Returning to Norway, he worked for his father's engineering firm, Haukelid og Five.

== World War II ==
Following the German occupation of Norway during World War II, he joined the Norwegian Independent Company 1 (Kompani Linge) in 1941. After extensive special training in Great Britain, he was selected as deputy commander of the Gunnerside group and sent back to Norway in 1943. Knut Haukelid and members of the Kompani Linge sabotaged the Nazi Germany-controlled heavy water Vemork plant in Rjukan in a long-range raid which began at an airfield in England. On February 28, 1943, the demolition team entered the Norsk Hydro plant and set explosive charges. The heavy water produced at a facility in occupied Norway was vital for the Third Reich's participation in the nuclear bomb race. The British War Cabinet subsequently ordered Haukelid to sink the Norwegian ferry SF Hydro as she transported containers of heavy water across Lake Tinn. The ferry was sunk with hidden explosives on February 20, 1944, killing 4 Germans and 14 Norwegian civilians.

== Post-war life ==
For his participation in these raids, Knut Haukelid received multiple awards including Norway's highest decoration for military gallantry, the War Cross with sword. He was awarded this decoration twice, in 1944 and 1947: the War Cross with two swords. In addition, Haukelid was decorated by the British with the Distinguished Service Order and later with the Military Cross.

Haukelid graduated from the Norwegian Military Academy in 1948. He served as major in the Telemark Infantry Regiment, and was later appointed head of the Home guard of Greater Oslo. Haukelid became a lieutenant colonel in the Army Infantry in 1959 and served as colonel and district commander of Greater Oslo Homeguard from 1966 until his retirement. He retired as a lieutenant colonel in 1974.

In the spring of 1984, on the 40th anniversary of the sabotage action against the heavy water plant at Vemork, the survivors of the Kompani Linge group who participated in the action were honored at a reception at the residence Mark Evans Austad, American Ambassador in Oslo.

On October 18, 1985, Knut Haukelid was honored at the Second Annual Scandinavian-American Hall of Fame Banquet in Minot, North Dakota.

Knut Haukelid died at the age of 83 on March 8, 1994 at Det Norsk Diakonhjemmet in Oslo. He was buried at Vår Frelsers gravlund.

== Cultural references ==
- Knut Haukelid wrote his autobiography, Det demrer en dag in 1947 (revised edition 1953 under the name Kampen om tungtvannet).
- Knut Haukelid's Skis Against the Atom (1953) told of the successful sabotaging of the Nazis' supply of heavy water.
- Thomas Gallagher's Assault in Norway: Sabotaging the Nazi Nuclear Program provide accounts of the Norway raid and Haukelid's participation.
- The sabotage action against the Vemork plant was portrayed in the classic Norwegian 1948 film Kampen om tungtvannet. Haukelid played himself, as did most of the sabotage group. The film was released internationally as Operation Swallow: The Battle for Heavy Water.
- The Heroes of Telemark (1965) was a largely fictional account of the sabotage, starred Richard Harris as Knut Straud.
- In the 2015 TV mini-series The Heavy Water War produced by the Norwegian Broadcasting Corporation, Norwegian theatre and film actor Frank Kjosås portrays Haukelid's role in the heavy water operations.

== Honors ==
- Norway - War Cross with sword (1944)
- Norway - War Cross with two swords (1947)
- Norway - St. Olav's Medal With Oak Branch (1943)
- United Kingdom - Distinguished Service Order
- United Kingdom - Military Cross
- USA - Medal of Freedom with Silver Palm
- France - Legion of Honor
- France - Croix de Guerre with Palm and Star
- Sweden - Commander of Order of the Sword

== See also ==
- German nuclear energy project

== Additional sources ==
- Haukelid, Knut (1989) Skis Against the Atom: The Exciting, First Hand Account of Heroism and Daring Sabotage During the Nazi Occupation of Norway (North American Heritage Press. Minot, North Dakota) ISBN 0-942323-07-6
- Haukelid, Knut (1947). Det demrer en dag (in Norwegian). Oslo: Nasjonalforlaget.
- Poulsson, Jens-Anton (2006). Tungtvannssabotasjen (in Norwegian). Oslo: Orion. ISBN 82-458-0803-2.

== Related reading ==
- Dahl, Per F. (1999) Heavy water and the wartime race for nuclear energy (Institute of Physics Publishing) ISBN 0-585-25449-4
- Gallagher, Thomas (2002) Assault In Norway: Sabotaging the Nazi Nuclear Program (The Lyons Press; Globe Pequot Press) ISBN 1585747505)
