= Scouting and Guiding in Norway =

Scouting and Guiding in Norway is served by the Speiderne i Norge (formerly: Speidernes Fellesorganisasjon), a federation of

- Norges Speiderforbund (Norwegian Guide and Scout Association)
- Norges KFUM-KFUK-speidere (YWCA-YMCA Guides and Scouts of Norway).

== Old Scouts ==
- St. Georgs Gildene i Norge, member of International Scout and Guide Fellowship

== International Scouting units in Norway ==
In addition, there are American Boy Scouts in Oslo, and Norway is in a peculiar position (as is Russia), as American Scouts there may be linked either to the Direct Service branch of the Boy Scouts of America, which supports units around the world, or to the Horizon District of the Transatlantic Council, which supports units in west-and-central Europe, the Near East and North Africa, at the discretion of the individual pack or troop.

- Girlguiding UK, served by British Guides in Foreign Countries
- Girl Scouts of the USA, served by USAGSO headquarters
