= HNoMS Uredd (P41) =

Coordinates: 67°5′N 13°31′E

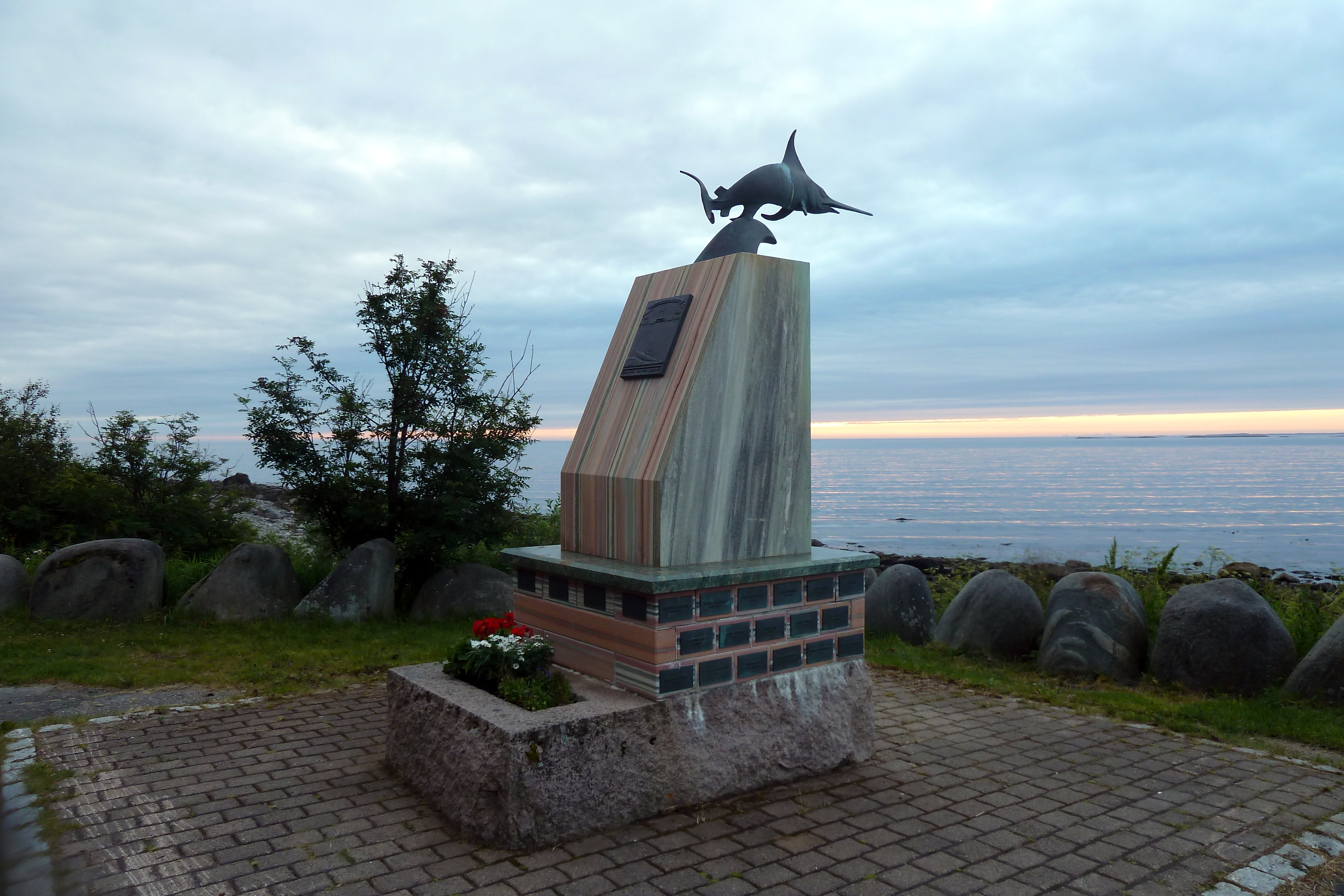
- In memory of "Uredd"-submarine that was sunk in Fugløyfjorden, Nordland, Norway in 1943

History

United Kingdom
- Name: P41
- Ordered: 11 March 1940
- Builder: Vickers-Armstrongs, Barrow-in-Furness
- Laid down: 15 October 1940
- Launched: 24 August 1941
- Fate: Transferred to Royal Norwegian Navy

Norway
- Name: Uredd
- Commissioned: 12 December 1941
- Fate: Sunk, 10 February 1943

General characteristics
- Class & type: U-class submarine
- Displacement: Surfaced: 540 long tons (549 t) standard; 630 long tons (640 t) full load; Submerged: 730 long tons (742 t)
- Length: 58.22 m (191 ft 0 in)
- Beam: 4.9 m (16 ft 1 in)
- Draught: 4.62 m (15 ft 2 in)
- Propulsion: Diesel-electric: 2 × Paxman-Ricardo diesel engines, 615 hp (460 kW); Electric motors, 825 hp (615 kW); 2 shafts
- Speed: 11.25 knots (20.84 km/h; 12.95 mph) surfaced; 10 knots (19 km/h; 12 mph) submerged
- Complement: 27-31
- Armament: 4 × 21 inch (533 mm) torpedo tubes (bows); 8-10 torpedoes; 1 × 3-inch (76 mm) deck gun

HMS P41 was a Royal Navy U-class submarine built by Vickers-Armstrongs. She was transferred to the exiled Royal Norwegian Navy before completion and renamed HNoMS Uredd. She and one of the B-class in 1940 have so far been the only Norwegian submarines to have been sunk.

== Service history ==
Ordered on 11 March 1940, the submarine was laid down at the Vickers-Armstrongs shipyard in Barrow-in-Furness on 15 October 1940, and launched on 24 August 1941.

She was transferred to Norwegian command on 7 December 1941. She served mostly as a patrol craft off the coast of Nazi-occupied Norway, eventually completing a total of seven successful missions for the Royal Norwegian Navy, sinking several German ships.

In February 1943 she was assigned, under the command of Rolf Q. Røren, to drop off six Kompani Linge soldiers at Bodø as part of Operation Seagull - and then proceed to the island of Senja to pick up two French submariners who had been left behind by the Junon.

Contact with Uredd was lost and she was believed to have been sunk in a German minefield on 10 February. The Royal Norwegian Navy officially declared her lost on 20 February 1943, the Royal Navy on 28 February.

In 1985, HNoMS Tana discovered the wreckage of the Uredd southwest of Fugløyvær and confirmed that she had hit a German minefield laid by the German minelayer Cobra - killing the crew of 34 and six soldiers. The following year, King Olav V unveiled a memorial to those lost aboard the Uredd, located in Grensen. The wreck is officially a war grave.

As HNoMS Uredd was operating with the Royal Navy's 9th Submarine Flotilla based at Dundee in Scotland, her crew are all commemorated on Dundee International Submarine Memorial.
