= Birger Strømsheim =

Norwegian resistance fighter in World War II

- Born: 11 October 1911; Ålesund, Norway
- Died: 10 November 2012 (aged 101); Oslo, Norway
- Military career
- Allegiance: Norway
- Branch: Norwegian Army
- Service years: 1941–1945
- Unit: Norwegian Independent Company 1
- Conflicts: Norwegian Campaign
- Awards: (Norway) St. Olav's Medal with Oak Branch (Norway) Defence Medal with rosette (Norway) Haakon VIIs 70th Anniversary Medal (United Kingdom) Military Medal (United States) Medal of Freedom with bronze palm (France) Legion of Honour (France) Croix de guerre with bronze palm

Birger Edvin Martin Strømsheim (11 October 1911 – 10 November 2012) was a Norwegian resistance member during World War II, especially noted for his role in the heavy water sabotage 1942–1943.

== Background ==
Strømsheim was born at Ålesund, Norway, He worked as a building contractor. After the German occupation of Norway, together with his wife Aase Liv Strømsheim (1912–97), he fled in 1941 by boat to Shetland, determined to join the war effort. After the war, he returned to civilian life. Strømsheim lived at Nordberghjemmet in Oslo where he worked for a factory of Fjeldhammer Brugbut. He also had a role in preparations for the stay-behind effort in Norway.

Strømsheim died 10 November 2012, in Oslo, Norway, at the age of 101. He was buried at the cemetery of Nordstrand Church (Nordstrand kirkegård) in Oslo.

== World War II ==
=== Heavy water sabotage ===
Strømsheim served in the Norwegian Independent Company 1 (Norwegian: Kompani Linge) during World War II. As a member of the Gunnerside team he parachuted in Telemark on 16 February 1943. After five days of struggling through snowstorms on skis, the team managed to join forces with the Grouse team, previously deployed in the area. The combined team succeeded in the destruction of heavy water equipment and stock at Vemork in February 1943. Strømsheim was one of four who entered the actual factory building.

Operation Gunnerside was later claimed by Special Operations Executive leadership to be the most successful act of sabotage of the Second World War. The leader of Gunnerside, Joachim Rønneberg, described Strømsheim as “beyond doubt the best member of the party”.

Strømsheim was awarded Norway's St. Olav's Medal With Oak Branch after his return to United Kingdom in 1943. It was presented to him by King Haakon at a ceremony at the training school STS 26 in Scotland, near Nethy Bridge.

=== Operation Fieldfare ===
As a member of a four-man team from Norwegian Independent Company 1, Strømsheim participated in establishing a cabin that was used as base for sabotage actions against German supply lines in the valley of Romsdal.

=== Awards ===
For his war contributions Strømsheim was decorated with the Defence Medal with rosette and Haakon VIIs 70th Anniversary Medals, as well as the St. Olav's Medal With Oak Branch and foreign awards.

== See also ==
- Operation Swallow: The Battle for Heavy Water
- The Heavy Water War
