= Kasper Idland =

Norwegian resistance member (1918–1968)

- Born: 21 June 1918; Figgjo
- Died: 25 May 1968 (aged 49)
- Military career
- Allegiance: Norway
- Branch: Norwegian Army
- Service years: 1940–1945
- Rank: Second Lieutenant
- Unit: Norwegian Independent Company 1 (Norwegian: Kompani Linge)
- Conflicts: World War II Dirdal Operation Anklet Operation Gunnerside Vestige 4 Varg
- Awards: Military Medal; Presidential Medal of Freedom; Croix de Guerre; Légion d'honneur; St. Olav's Medal With Oak Branch

Kasper Idland MM (21 June 1918 – 25 May 1968) was a Norwegian resistance member during World War II. Idland took part in the Norwegian heavy water sabotage in 1943.

== Early life and education ==
Idland was born in Figgjo, the second child of Karsten og Gudrun Berg Idland, and had seven siblings. He graduated as an army sergeant in 1937, after 3½ years at Hærens underoffisersskole at Gimlemoen in Kristiansand Municipality. He then attended the school for postal officers, later working at the Post Office in Stavanger.

== World War II ==
As Norway was invaded by Germany, Idland joined the Norwegian military forces at Sviland on 9 and 10 April 1940, and participated in the battles at Dirdal. He was held as a prisoner of war by the Germans at Madla, but was later released.

=== Kompani Linge ===
In September 1941, Idland travelled by boat from Egersund to Peterhead in Scotland, and was soon enrolled into the Norwegian Independent Company 1 (Norwegian: Kompani Linge). He participated in the Commando raid Operation Anklet to Reine and Moskenes in December 1941.

=== Heavy water sabotage ===
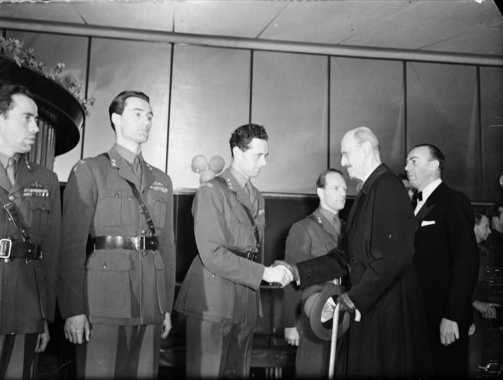
The première of the documentary film Kampen om tungtvannet on 5 February 1948. Left to right: Knut Haukelid, Joachim Rønneberg, Jens Anton Poulsson (shaking hands with King Haakon VII), Kasper Idland

Idland was noted for his role in the Norwegian heavy water sabotage in 1943. As a member of the Gunnerside team, he was parachuted onto the Hardangervidda plateau on 16 February 1943. He was one of the four saboteurs who entered the Vemork facility right after midnight 27/28 February, where the team leader Joachim Rønneberg placed explosives on the heavy water cylinders. After the mission at Vemork he escaped by ski to Sweden, together with four other members of the group.

=== Vestige 4 ===
From 1944 to 1945, Idland was active in Egersund, as a member of the resistance group Vestige 4. The primary aim of the Vestige operations was shipping sabotage, but the Vestige 4 group never carried out ship sabotage. As a member of this group, he participated in burning down the AT camp in Bjerkreim in January 1945.

=== Varg ===
From March 1945, Idland was working to establish the base area Varg in the Setesdal area. Idland was leading one of the Varg resistance groups, located at the mountain cabin Langelona. The group received supplies (weapons, ammunition and food) from parachuted containers delivered from allied aircraft. The Langelona group was still small when the war ended in May 1945.

== Post war ==
Idland lived in Stavanger until 1955, when he moved to the United States and settled in East Farmingdale, New York.

== Honours and awards ==
- St. Olav's Medal With Oak Branch
- War Medal
- Defence Medal 1940–1945 with Rosette
- Haakon VII's 70-Medal
- Military Medal (United Kingdom)
- Legion of Honour (France)
- Croix de guerre 1939–1945 (France)
- Medal of Freedom (with bronze palm) (United States)
