= HMS Bedouin =

Destroyer of the Royal Navy

Coordinates: 36°12′0″N 11°38′0″E

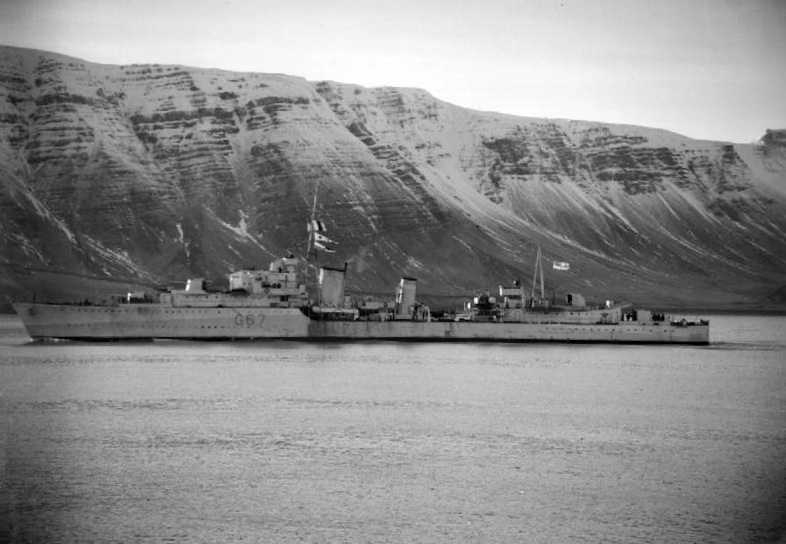
- Bedouin at Hvalfjörður, Iceland

History

United Kingdom
- Name: Bedouin
- Namesake: Bedouin
- Ordered: 19 June 1936
- Builder: William Denny, Dumbarton
- Cost: £340,400
- Laid down: 13 January 1937
- Launched: 21 December 1937
- Completed: 15 March 1939
- Identification: Pennant numbers: L67, F67
- Fate: Sunk by surface and aerial forces, 15 June 1942

General characteristics (as built)
- Class & type: Tribal-class destroyer
- Displacement: 1,891 long tons (1,921 t) (standard); 2,519 long tons (2,559 t) (deep load)
- Length: 377 ft (114.9 m) (o/a)
- Beam: 36 ft 6 in (11.13 m)
- Draught: 11 ft 3 in (3.43 m)
- Installed power: 3 × Admiralty 3-drum boilers; 44,000 shp (33,000 kW)
- Propulsion: 2 × shafts; 2 × geared steam turbines
- Speed: 36 knots (67 km/h; 41 mph)
- Range: 5,700 nmi (10,600 km; 6,600 mi) at 15 knots (28 km/h; 17 mph)
- Complement: 190
- Sensors & processing systems: ASDIC
- Armament: 4 × twin 4.7 in (120 mm) guns; 1 × quadruple 2-pdr (40 mm (1.6 in)) AA guns; 2 × quadruple 0.5 in (12.7 mm) anti-aircraft machineguns; 1 × quadruple 21 in (533 mm) torpedo tubes; 20 × depth charges, 1 × rack, 2 × throwers

HMS Bedouin was a Tribal-class destroyer of the British Royal Navy that saw service in World War II.

== Description ==
The Tribals were intended to counter the large destroyers being built abroad and to improve the firepower of the existing destroyer flotillas and were thus significantly larger and more heavily armed than the preceding I class. The ships displaced 1,891 long tons (1,921 t) at standard load and 2,519 long tons (2,559 t) at deep load. They had an overall length of 377 feet (114.9 m), a beam of 36 feet 6 inches (11.13 m) and a draught of 11 feet 3 inches (3.43 m). The destroyers were powered by two Parsons geared steam turbines, each driving one propeller shaft using steam provided by three Admiralty three-drum boilers. The turbines developed a total of 44,000 shaft horsepower (33,000 kW) and gave a maximum speed of 36 knots (67 km/h; 41 mph). During her sea trials Bedouin made 37.5 knots (69.5 km/h; 43.2 mph) from 44,522 shp (33,200 kW) at a displacement of 2,035 long tons (2,068 t). The ships carried enough fuel oil to give them a range of 5,700 nautical miles (10,600 km; 6,600 mi) at 15 knots (28 km/h; 17 mph). The ships' complement consisted of 190 officers and ratings, although the flotilla leaders carried an extra 20 officers and men consisting of the Captain (D) and his staff.

The primary armament of the Tribal-class destroyers was eight quick-firing (QF) 4.7-inch (120 mm) Mark XII guns in four superfiring twin-gun mounts, one pair each fore and aft of the superstructure, designated 'A', 'B', 'X', and 'Y' from front to rear. The mounts had a maximum elevation of 40°. For anti-aircraft (AA) defence, they carried a single quadruple mount for the 40-millimetre (1.6 in) QF two-pounder Mk II "pom-pom" gun and two quadruple mounts for the 0.5-inch (12.7 mm) Mark III machine gun. Low-angle fire for the main guns was controlled by the director-control tower (DCT) on the bridge roof that fed data acquired by it and the 12-foot (3.7 m) rangefinder on the Mk II Rangefinder/Director directly aft of the DCT to an analogue mechanical computer, the Mk I Admiralty Fire Control Clock. Anti-aircraft fire for the main guns was controlled by the Rangefinder/Director which sent data to the mechanical Fuze Keeping Clock.

The ships were fitted with a single above-water quadruple mount for 21-inch (533 mm) torpedoes. The Tribals were not intended as anti-submarine ships, but they were provided with ASDIC, one depth charge rack and two throwers for self-defence, although the throwers were not mounted in all ships. Twenty depth charges was the peacetime allotment, but this increased to 30 during wartime.

=== Wartime modifications ===
Heavy losses to German air attack during the Norwegian Campaign demonstrated the ineffectiveness of the Tribals' anti-aircraft suite and the RN decided in May 1940 to replace 'X' mount with two QF 4-inch (102 mm) Mark XVI dual-purpose guns in a twin-gun mount. To better control the guns, the existing rangefinder/director was modified to accept a Type 285 gunnery radar as they became available. The number of depth charges was increased to 46 early in the war, and still more were added later. To increase the firing arcs of the AA guns, the rear funnel was shortened and the mainmast was reduced to a short pole mast.

== Construction and career ==
Authorized as one of nine Tribal-class destroyers under the 1936 Naval Estimates, Bedouin was the second ship of her name to serve in the Royal Navy. The ship was ordered on 19 June 1936 from William Denny and was laid down on 13 January 1937 at the company's Dumbarton shipyard. Launched on 21 December, Bedouin was completed on 15 March 1938 and commissioned the previous day at a cost of £340,400 which excluded weapons and communications outfits furnished by the Admiralty.

Aerial view of Bedouin sinking, 15 June 1942

She served in the Second Battle of Narvik, where she was slightly damaged, and in the 1941 commando raid on the Lofoten islands. During Operation Harpoon, a large allied convoy to resupply Malta, she was sunk by the combined action of Italian cruisers Raimondo Montecuccoli and Eugenio di Savoia and an SM.79 torpedo bomber on 15 June 1942. Bedouin was hit by at least 12 six-inch rounds and near-misses from the cruisers and an aerial torpedo before sinking. A gunner manning a .5-inch (12.7 mm) quad machine gun mounting shot down the torpedo bomber which delivered the coup de grâce. Twenty-eight men from her complement were killed in action and 213 were taken as prisoners of war by the Italian Navy.
