= Operation Anklet =

1941 British commando raid in Norway during WWII

- Part of the North West Europe Campaign
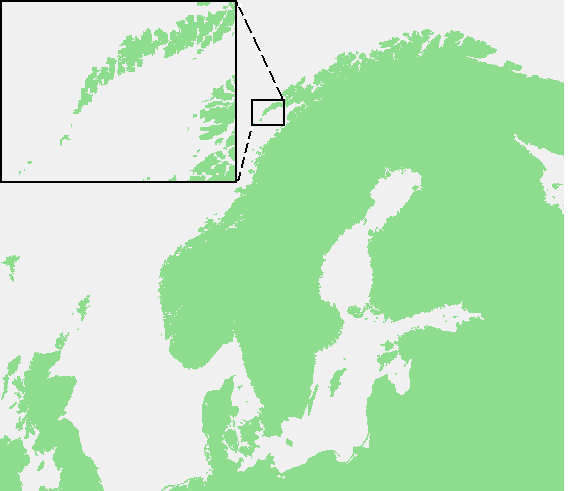
- Lofoten Islands
Date	26–27 December 1941
Location	Lofoten Islands 67°59′N 13°00′E
Result	Allied victory

Belligerents
United Kingdom; Norway; Poland	Germany

Commanders and leaders
(United Kingdom) Admiral Frederick Dalrymple-Hamilton; Naval: Captain Hugh Dalrymple-Smith; Land: Lieutenant Colonel S.S. Harrison	(Nazi Germany) Generaloberst Nikolaus von Falkenhorst

Strength
Naval: Royal Navy; 1 Light cruiser 6 Destroyers; 3 Minesweepers; 2 Landing Ship Infantry; 2 Submarines; 1 Survey ship Royal Fleet Auxiliary; 2 Tankers; 1 Freighter 1 Tugboat Royal Norwegian Navy; 2 Corvettes; Polish Navy; 2 Destroyers Land: No. 12 Commando 223 men Norwegian Company 77 men	Eight divisions in Norway three coastal defence four infantry one Luftwaffe Field Division; Unknown number of aircraft and naval forces

Casualties and losses
1 light cruiser heavily damaged	1 patrol ship sunk 2 wireless stations destroyed

Operation Anklet was the codename given to a British Commando raid during the Second World War. The raid on the Lofoten Islands was carried out in December 1941, by 300 men from No. 12 Commando and the Norwegian Independent Company 1. The landing party was supported by 22 ships from three navies.

At the same time, another raid was taking place in Vågsøy. This raid was Operation Archery, on 27 December 1941, and Operation Anklet was seen as a diversionary raid for this bigger raid, intended to draw away the German naval and air forces.

== Background ==
After the British Expeditionary Force had been evacuated from Dunkirk in 1940, the then British Prime Minister Winston Churchill called for a force to be assembled and equipped to inflict casualties on the Germans and bolster British morale. Churchill told the joint Chiefs of Staff to propose measures for an offensive against German-occupied Europe, and stated: "they must be prepared with specially trained troops of the hunter class who can develop a reign of terror down the enemy coast."

One staff officer, Lieutenant-Colonel Dudley Clarke, had already submitted such a proposal to General Sir John Dill, the Chief of the Imperial General Staff. Dill, aware of Churchill's intentions, approved Clarke's proposal.

The Commandos came under the operational control of the Combined Operations Headquarters. The man initially selected as the commander was Admiral Sir Roger Keyes, a veteran of the Gallipoli Campaign and the Zeebrugge Raid in the First World War. In 1940, the call went out for volunteers from among the serving Army soldiers within certain formations still in Britain, and men of the disbanding Divisional Independent Companies originally raised from Territorial Army Divisions who had seen service in Norway. (Note: The 10 independent companies were raised from volunteers in second line Territorial Army divisions in April 1940. They were intended for guerrilla style operations in Norway following the German invasion. Each of the 10 companies initially consisted of 21 officers and 268 other ranks.)

The Lofoten Islands form part of the north western Norwegian coastline about 100 mi (160 km) inside the Arctic Circle. Operation Anklet would be the second raid on the islands. The first, Operation Claymore, had taken place in March 1941, and the third raid, Operation Archery, would take place at the same time as Operation Anklet.

The raid was organised by the Combined Operations Headquarters, and would only use naval and land assets, the Royal Air Force was not involved. But it would be the last raid undertaken without air support.

The naval force formed for Operation Anklet consisted of 22 ships from three navies. The Royal Navy provided the most ships which included the light cruiser HMS Arethusa; six destroyers (HMS Somali, Ashanti, Bedouin, Eskimo, Lamerton and Wheatland); three minesweepers (HMS Speedwell, Harrier and Halcyon); two Landing Ship Infantry (HMS Prins Albert and Prinses Josephine Charlotte); the submarines HMS Tigris, HMS Sealion; and the survey ship HMS Scott. The Royal Fleet Auxiliary provided two fleet tankers (RFA Gray Ranger and Black Ranger); the freighter Gudrun Maersk; and the Tugboat Jaunty.

The exiled Royal Norwegian Navy provided the corvettes HNoMS Andenes and Eglantine, while the Polish Navy provided the destroyers ORP Krakowiak and Kujawiak.

The landing force was supplied by 223 men of No. 12 Commando, supported by 77 men of the Norwegian Independent Company 1.

== Mission ==
The naval task force was assembled at three locations: Scapa Flow, Greenock and Lerwick. The task force, now known as Force J, left Scapa and Greenock for the Lofoten Islands on Monday 22 December, and those at Lerwick the following day. En route to join up with the main force, the infantry landing ship Prinses Josephine Charlotte developed engine trouble, and together with her destroyer escort Wheatland was sent back to Scapa, arriving on 24 December. Wheatland left Scapa alone on 25 December to catch up with the rest of Force J. As the task force approached the islands, the submarine Sealion was already in position to act as a navigational beacon for the attack, which was planned for 26 December.

When the task force arrived, the infantry landing ship Prins Albert, escorted by destroyer Lamerton and corvettes Eglantine and Acanthus, headed towards Moskenesøya to land the commandos. Some of the other ships conducted operations around the islands. The destroyer Bedouin destroyed a radio station at Flakstadøya, while the cruiser Arethusa and destroyers Somali, Ashanti, and Eskimo entered the Vestfjorden. Here they captured the Norwegian coastal steamers Kong Harald and Nordland and Ashanti sank a German patrol boat.

The 300-man landing force landed at 06:00 on Boxing Day. The date had been selected by British planners, who expected the German garrison to be concentrating on the Christmas festivities and would therefore be caught unprepared. The landings were unopposed as the commandos, dressed in white camouflaged overalls, were landed on the western side of the island of Moskenesøya. They soon occupied the villages of Reine and Moskenes, capturing the small German garrison and a number of Norwegian Quislings at the radio station at Glåpen.

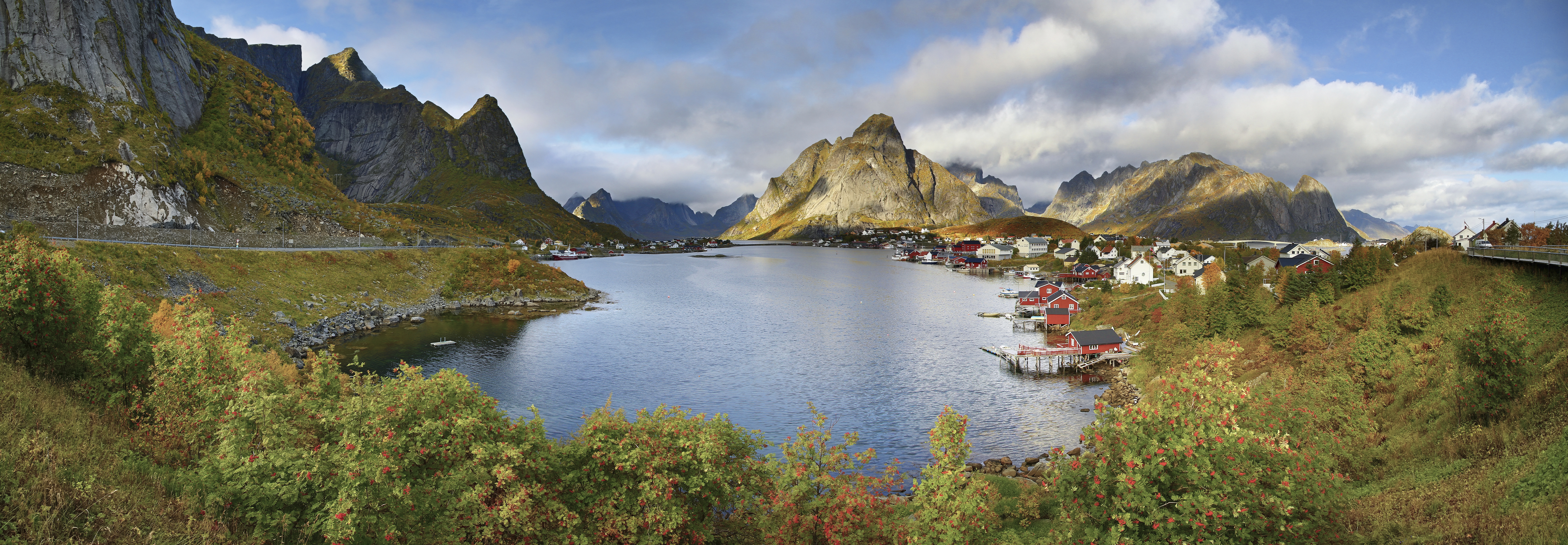
Reine one of the villages occupied in the raid

The raiding force was attacked on 27 December 1941 by a German seaplane that bombed the cruiser Arethusa. Although it was not hit, it did suffer some damage that would require 14 weeks in dock to repair. With no air support of their own, the commander of the raid, Admiral Hamilton, having occupied the Norwegian villages for two days, decided to pull out and head back to Scapa, where they arrived on 1 January 1942.

== Aftermath ==
During Operation Anklet, two radio transmitters were destroyed, several small German boats were captured or sunk, and a small number of Germans and Quislings were made prisoners of war. The navy also captured an Enigma coding machine, with its associated wheels and settings, from the patrol ship they had sunk. They also returned with over 200 Norwegians who volunteered to serve in the Free Norwegian Forces. The raid was successful, with no casualties to the Allied force. At least one lesson seemed to have been learnt, as it was the last raid undertaken without air support. During the war, there were 12 commando raids directed against Norway. The German response was to increase the number of troops they stationed there. By 1944, the German garrison in Norway had increased to 370,000 men. A British infantry division in 1944 had 18,347 men.

== Citations ==
=== Bibliography ===
- Brayley, Martin; Chappell, Mike (2001). British Army 1939–45 (1): North-West Europe. Osprey Publishing. ISBN 1-84176-052-8.
- Chappell, Mike (1996). Army Commandos 1940–1945. Osprey Publishing. ISBN 1-85532-579-9.
- Haskew, Michael E (2007). Encyclopaedia of Elite Forces in the Second World War. Pen and Sword. ISBN 978-1-84415-577-4.
- Joslen, H. F. (1990). Orders of Battle, Second World War, 1939–1945. Naval & Military Press. ISBN 1-84342-474-6.
- Messenger, Charles (2004). The D Day Atlas. Thames & Hudson. ISBN 978-0-500-25123-2.
- Moreman, Timothy Robert (2006). British Commandos 1940–46. Osprey Publishing. ISBN 1-84176-986-X.

=== Further reading ===
- Sebag-Montefiore, Hugh (2001) [2000]. Enigma: The Battle for the Code (4th, pbk. Phoenix ed.). London: Weidenfeld & Nicolson. ISBN 0-75381-130-8.
