= Per Hansson (journalist) =

Norwegian journalist

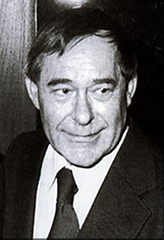
Per Hansson

Per Hansson (24 July 1922 – 12 June 1982) was a Norwegian journalist.

He was born in Kragerø. He was the editor-in-chief of the newspapers Sør-Trøndelag from 1949 to 1954 and Akershus Folkeblad from 1954 to 1958. In 1958 he was hired as a journalist in Dagbladet, where he stayed until 1970. He published several books on Norway during World War II; 1965's Det største spillet was made into a film in 1967, with the English title The Greatest Gamble. The same year he was awarded the Gyldendal's Endowment.
