= Martin Linge =

Norwegian actor and military commander (1894–1941)

Martin Jensen Linge
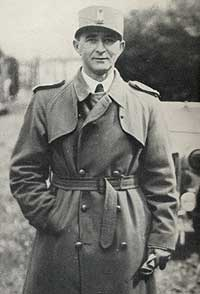
- Born: 11 December 1894; Linge Farm in Norddal Municipality, Sunnmøre, Sweden-Norway
- Died: 27 December 1941 (aged 47); Måløy in Sør-Vågsøy Municipality in Sogn og Fjordane, Reichskommissariat Norwegen
- Spouse: Margit F. Vogt
- Military career
- Allegiance: Norway
- Branch: Norwegian Army
- Service years: 1915; 1940–1941
- Rank: Kaptein (Captain)
- Units: Royal Norwegian Army; SOE
- Commands: Units: Norwegian Independent Company 1 (1941)
- Conflicts: World War II: Norwegian Campaign; Operation Claymore; Operation Archery †
- Awards: War Cross with sword (Norway); Distinguished Service Cross (UK)
- Other work: Pioneer aviator, actor, sailor

Martin Jensen Linge, DSC (11 December 1894 – 27 December 1941) was a Norwegian actor who, in World War II, became the commander of the Norwegian Independent Company 1 (NOR.I.C.1) (pronounced as Norisen by the Norwegians), formed in March 1941 for operations on behalf of the Special Operations Executive.

== Biography ==
Martin Linge was born in Norddal Municipality in Møre og Romsdal county, Norway. In 1915 he graduated as a non-commissioned officer from the military school in Trondheim. He subsequently studied at the Trondheim Theatre (1917–1918). He debuted on the stage at the Central Theatre in Oslo in 1921 and appeared in both theatre and films during the 1920s and 1930s.

Martin Linge was father of Jan Herman Linge, an engineer and boat designer. He was also the grandfather of Norwegian novelist Espen Haavardsholm, who wrote about his grandfather in Martin Linge – min morfar. Familieroman med fotografier (Gyldendal norsk forlag. 1993).

== Military career ==
Shortly after the German attack on Norway on 9 April 1940 he traveled to Åndalsnes to join his regiment. He had previously attained the rank of Lieutenant (in the reserve forces), and was also one of the first Norwegians to obtain a pilot's licence. When British troops landed at Åndalsnes from 17 April, Linge became liaison officer between the local regiment and the British. Åndalsnes (and other towns in Møre og Romsdal county) was at this time still unoccupied territory and the only port with railway connections to East Norway and the campaign there. The King, the crown prince, the cabinet, Norway's gold and cash holdings, and finally Commander-in-chief of the Norwegian armed forces general Otto Ruge with staff, escaped through Åndalsnes. Trygve Lie in his memoirs recalls meeting Linge at Åndalsnes. During German air bombing of a makeshift airfield at Setnesmoen, he was wounded and evacuated by boat to Britain. He was the first wounded Norwegian soldier to arrive in Britain.

Among exiled Norwegians, Linge along with Nordahl Grieg and Olav Rytter were the first to propose ideas for resistance against the German occupation. "Our land is perfect for secret resistance and guerrilla warfare" he declared in June 1940. In August 1940 he was appointed as liaison officer to the War Office and soon began recruiting men and organizing what became Norwegian Independent Company 1.

Linge was killed during Operation Archery, a British Combined Operations raid at Måløy against German military positions on Vågsøy Island. During the Occupation of Norway by Nazi Germany, Måløy was used as a German coastal fortress, which had led to the eradication of all settlement on the island to make room for the fortress. Linge is buried at the Vestre gravlund (Western Cemetery) in Oslo.

Subsequently, the unit he had led was named Kompani Linge in his honor. Linge Company was more formally known as Lingekompaniet (The Linge Company) ('-et' being the definite article suffix), by Norwegians. He was awarded Norway's highest military decoration for gallantry, the War Cross with sword.

== Filmography ==
- 1926 - Vägarnas kung – Ola, a farm boy
- 1935 - Samhold må til – Warden
- 1938 - Det drønner gjennom dalen – Policeman (Lensmannsbetjent)
- 1938 - Bør Børson Jr. – Nils Bækken
- 1939 - Gjest Baardsen – Fisherman

== Legacy ==
Martin Linge and his life are portrayed in the 1 hour documentary Martin Linge - skuespiller og legende (Martin Linge: Actor and Legend), which aired on NRK1 Fakta på Lørdag on 8 May 2004, produced by XpoMedia and Forsvarets Mediesenter (armed forces media center), directed by Mary Ann Myrvang and Runar Skjong, based on a concept, research, and script by Mary Ann Myrvang. Martin Linge is portrayed by the Norwegian actor Petter Næss in the 2008 movie Max Manus.

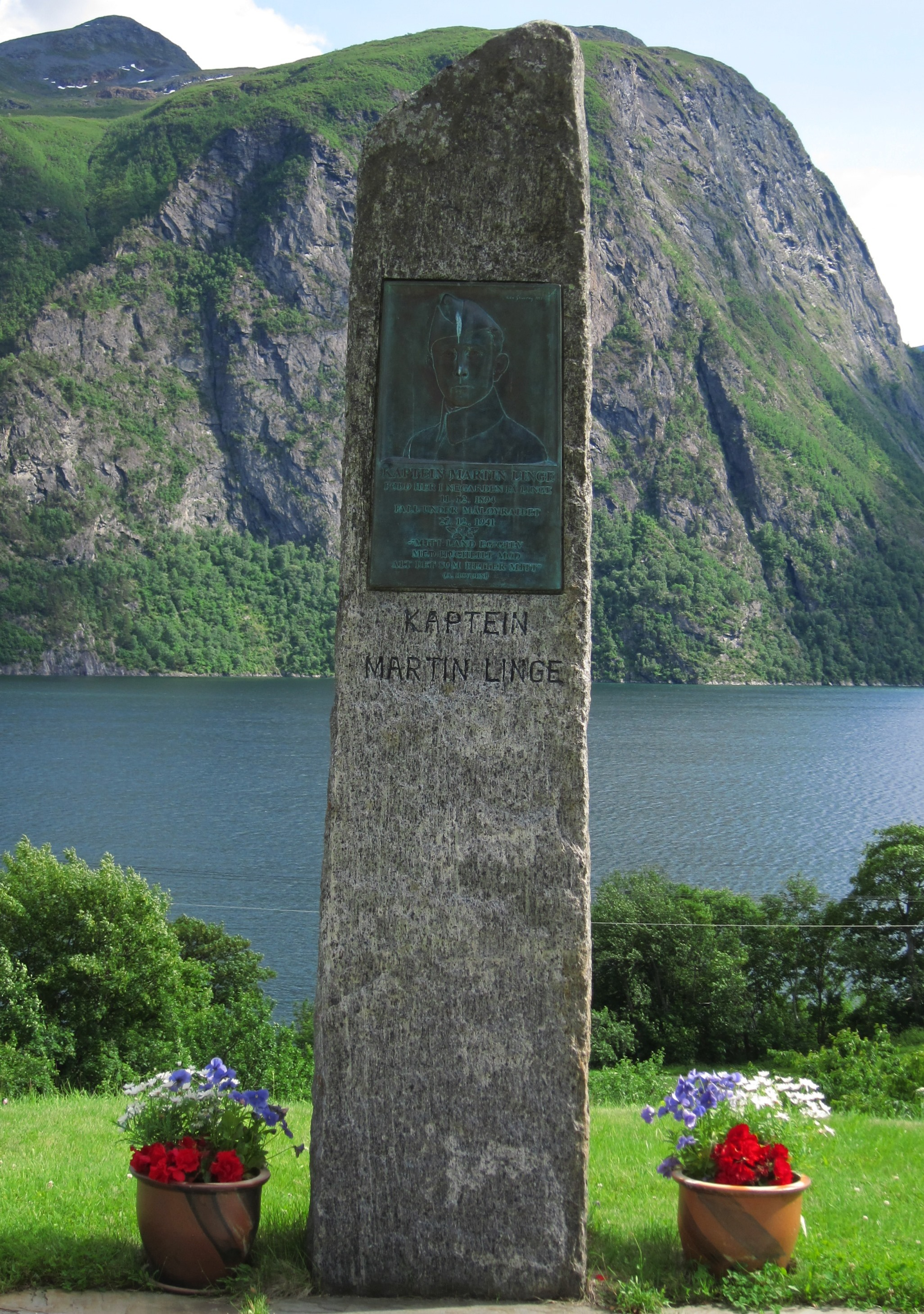
Memorial at the Linge farm in Norddal

=== Memorials ===
- Statue in the Linge park in Måløy
- Crown Prince Olav unveiled a memorial stone and plaque at the Linge farm in Norddal on 17 June 1946.
- An oil field in North Sea is named after him. The oil field was previously named Hild.

=== Streets named in his honour ===
- Kaptein Linges vei, Ålesund
- Kompani Linges vei, Stavanger
- Martin Linges vei, Snarøya
- Martin Linges vei, Oslo
- Martin Linges vei, Strømmen
- Martin Linges veg, Moss
- Martin Linges veg, Heimdal
- Martin Linges gate, Haugesund

== Other sources ==
- Ford, Ken (2011) Operation Archery - The Commandos and the Vaagso Raid 1942 (Osprey Publishing) ISBN 978-1-84908-372-0
- Devins, Joseph H. Jr. (1983) The Vaagso Raid (Bantam Books) ISBN 978-0-553-23310-0

== Fiction ==
- Øystein Wiik: Flammer og regn : en roman om Martin Linge, Oslo : Kagge forlag, 2022, ISBN 978-82-489-2994-9
- Øystein Wiik: Linges Mission : Roman, aus dem Norwegischen von Maike Dörries und Günther Frauenlob ; mit einem Nachwort des Autors, Bielefeld : Pendragon, 2025, ISBN 978-3-86532-899-1
