= Norwegian Independent Company 1 =

British special forces unit during WWII

Norwegian Independent Company 1 (NOR.I.C.1, pronounced Norisén (approx. "noor-ee-sehn") in Norwegian) was a British Special Operations Executive (SOE) group formed in March 1941 originally for the purpose of performing commando raids during the occupation of Norway by Nazi Germany. Organised under the leadership of Captain Martin Linge, it soon became a pool of talent for a variety of special operations in Norway.

== History ==
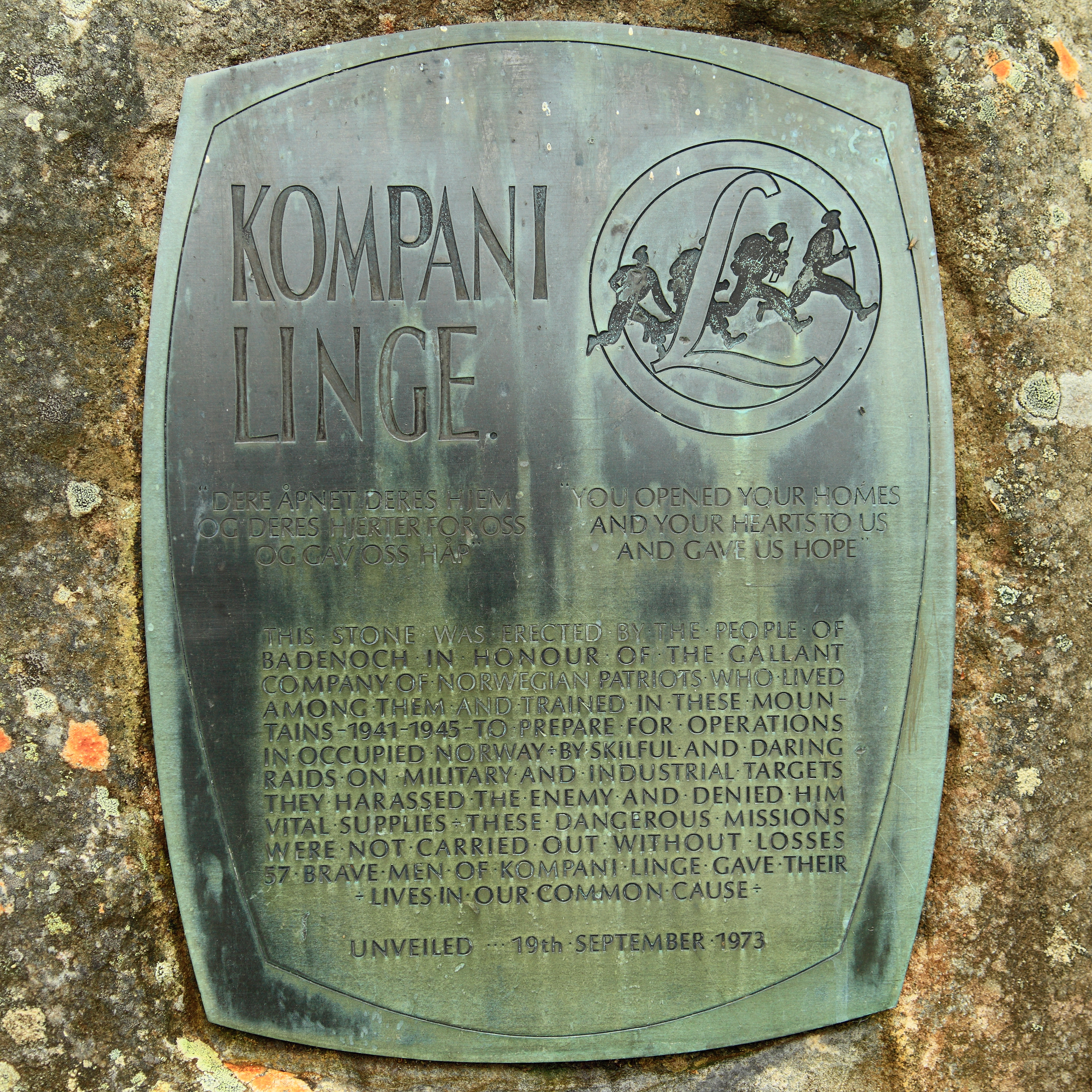
Kompani Linge Memorial, Glenmore Forest Park in Scotland

The original English-language administrative title did not have much resonance in Norwegian and they soon became better known as Kompani Linge (Linge's Company). Martin Linge's death early in the war came to enhance the title, which became formalised as Lingekompaniet in his honour.

The members of the unit were trained at various locations in the United Kingdom, including at the SOE establishment at Drumintoul Lodge in the Cairngorms, Scotland. At Glenmore in the Cairngorms, members of the unit trained in railway sabotage on the old disued Aviemore and Coylumbridge Timber Railway.

Their initial raids in 1941 were to Lofoten (Operation Claymore) and Måløy (Operation Archery), where Martin Linge was killed. Their best known raids were probably the Norwegian heavy water sabotage. Other raids included the Thamshavnbanen sabotage. In the capital area, the Oslogjengen carried out several sabotage missions. In cooperation with Milorg, the main Norwegian resistance organisation, communication lines with London were gradually improved during the war, so that by 1945, 64 radio operators were spread throughout Norway.

According to Mitt liv, the autobiography of Max Manus (1995. N.W. Damm), the Linge Company was for a time counted amongst the most decorated military forces in the United Kingdom during World War II. The veterans from the company were also amongst the first to welcome King Haakon home. A total of 530 Norwegians served in NOR.I.C.1, of whom 57 died.

== Members ==
- Alf Aakre
- Karl Johan Aarsæther
- Knut Aarsæther
- Olav Aarsæther
- Jan Allan
- Johannes S. Andersen
- Odd Andersen
- Gunnar Bjålie
- Svein Blindheim
- Jan Baalsrud
- Erik Gjems-Onstad
- Arne Gjestland
- Gregers Gram
- Evald Hansen
- Nils Uhlin Hansen
- Knut Haugland
- Knut Haukelid
- Claus Helberg
- Kasper Idland
- Fredrik Kayser
- Arne Kjelstrup
- Claus Gustav Myrin Koren
- Jan Herman Linge
- Martin Linge
- Erling Sven Lorentzen
- Max Manus
- Alf Malland
- Oskar Johan Nordvik
- Herluf Nygaard
- Martin Olsen
- George Parker
- Alv Kristian Pedersen
- Bjørn Pedersen
- Arthur Pevik
- Johnny Pevik
- Jens-Anton Poulsson
- Birger Rasmussen
- August Rathke (11 December 1925 - 25 December 2022, last surviving member)
- Boy Rist
- Joachim Rønneberg
- Harald Sandvik
- Einar Skinnarland
- Ingebjørg Skoghaug
- Odd Starheim
- Inge Steensland
- Kjell Stordalen
- Hans Storhaug
- Harald Stuve
- Gunnar Sønsteby
- Edvard Tallaksen
- Anton Telnes
- Ragnar Ulstein
- Knut Wigert
- Birger Strømsheim

== Operation Seagull agents ==
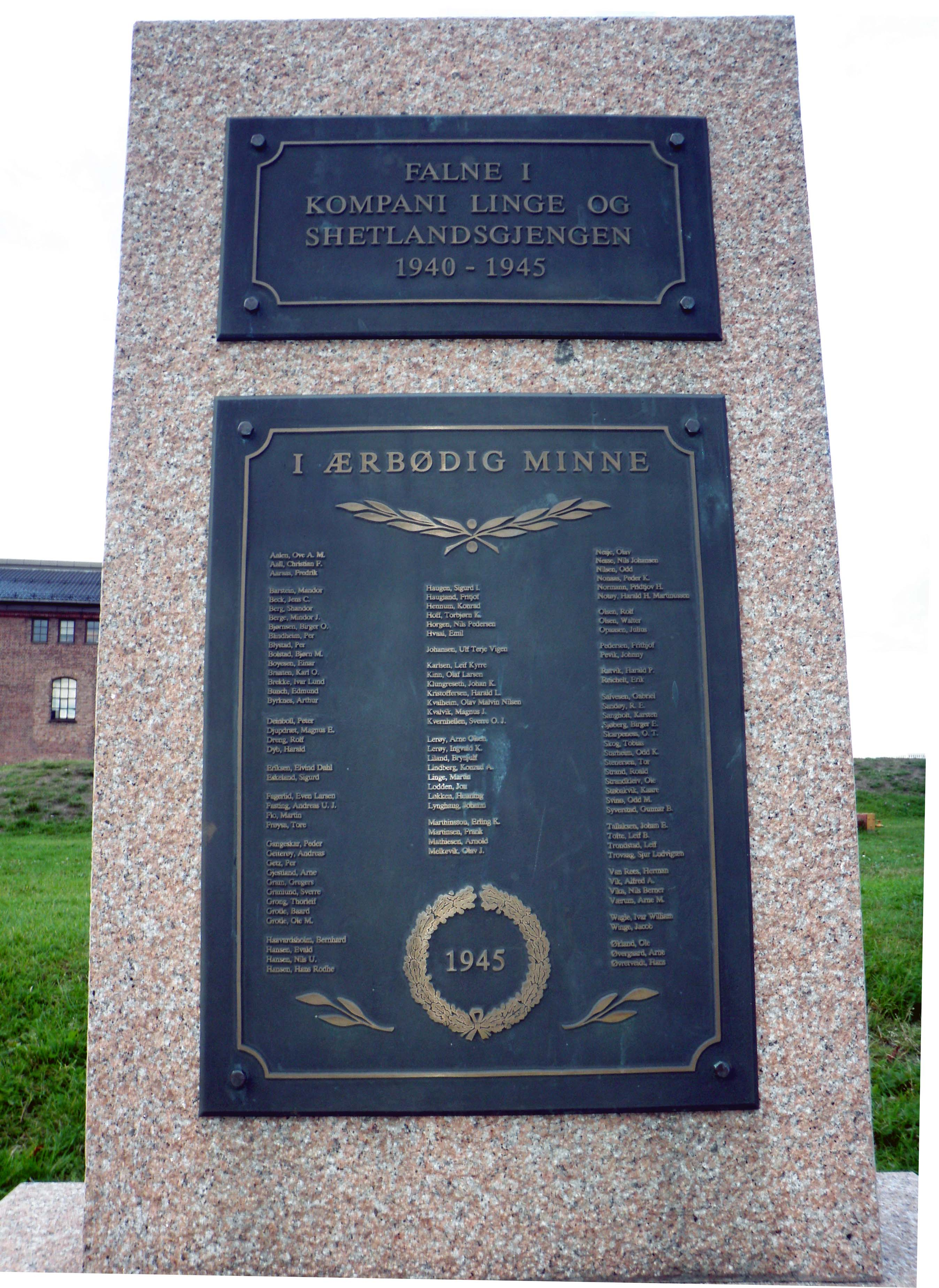
Memorial at Akershus Fortress to the members of the Norwegian Independent Company 1 and the Shetland bus who were killed in World War II

- Col Sverre Granlund - had also served as a commando during Operation Musketoon
- Sgt Thorlief Daniel Grong
- Lt Per Getz
- Pte Eivind Dahl Eriksen
- Pte Hans Rohde Hansen
- Tobias Skog

== Telavåg agents ==
- Emil Gustav Hvaal (codename Anchor)
- Arne Vaerum (codename Penguin)

== Sources ==
- Jensen, Erling; Ratvik, Per; Ulstein, Ragnar (1995) Kompani Linge (Oslo: LibriArte) ISBN 82-445-0057-3
- Manus, Max (1995) Mitt liv (N.W. Damm) ISBN 978-82-517-9399-5
