= St. Olav's Medal with Oak Branch =

St. Olav's Medal with Oak Branch St. Olavsmedaljen med ekegren
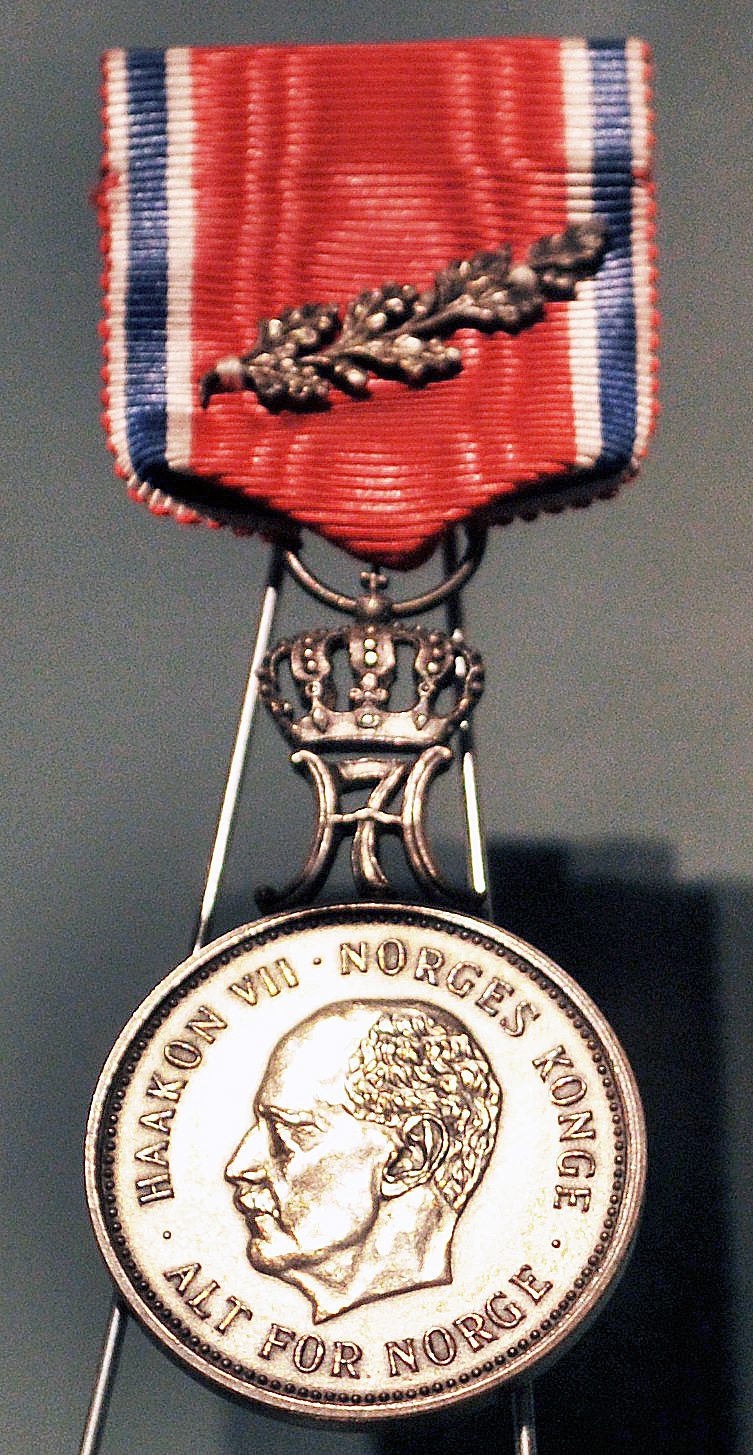
- Medal awarded to Leif Larsen
- Type: Medal
- Awarded for: Exceptional services to Norway during time of war
- Presented by: Norway
- Established: 6 February 1942
- Ribbon bar of the medal

Precedence
- Next (higher): King Haakon VII's Freedom Cross
- Next (lower): Medal for Heroic Deeds (Gold)
- Related: St. Olav's Medal

St. Olav's Medal with Oak Branch is a Norwegian military award, which was instituted by King Haakon VII of Norway on 6 February 1942. In Norway, the medal is considered as a separate award from the civilian St. Olav's Medal.

Among the Norwegians war-medals the award is ranked as number two, after the War Cross but ahead of King Haakon VII's Freedom Cross. Of all orders and decorations in Norway, both military and civil it is ranked as number six, then after King Haakon VII's Cross of Liberty but at the same time before Medal for Heroic Deeds. The civilian St. Olav's Medal, however, is ranked as number nine. If a recipient should receive the medal twice or more, it was on 6 October 1943 decided that several branches could be added to the medal.

The Medal is made of silver, and the tie contains the same colours found in the Norwegian flag. The Oak Branch symbolizes patriotism, bravery and strength. The Medal also bears the inscription "HAAKON VII * KING OF NORWAY * EVERYTHING FOR NORWAY" (in Norwegian "Haakon VII * Norges Konge * Alt for Norge").

It has been awarded to 779 Norwegians, including one woman; a few non-Norwegian citizens have also received the medal.
