= Haakon Sørbye =

Norwegian resistance member and professor

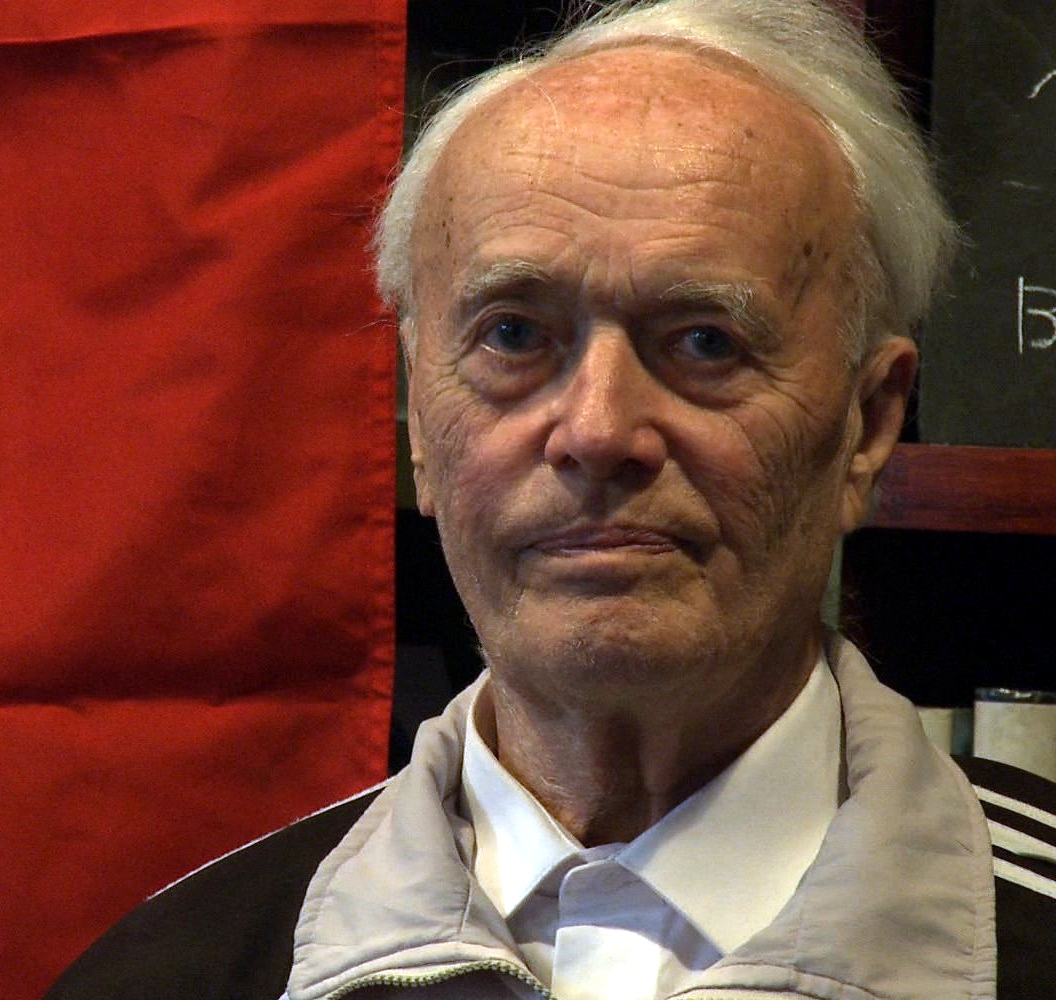
- Haakon Sørbye at Studentersamfundet in Trondheim, June 2008
- Born: 16 March 1920; Oslo, Norway
- Died: 15 September 2016 (aged 96); Bærum, Norway
- Military career
- Allegiance: Norway
- Service years: 1940–1945
- Unit: Skylark B
- Awards: (Norway) Defence Medal 1940–1945; (Norway) King Haakon VII's Medal of Liberty; (United Kingdom) King's Medal for Courage in the Cause of Freedom
- Other work: Engineer, War information work

Haakon Sørbye (16 March 1920 – 15 September 2016) was a Norwegian engineer and resistance member during World War II. He was a member of the radio group Skylark B during the war. After the war he was a professor at the Norwegian Institute of Technology.

== World War II ==
Sørbye attended secondary school at Stabekk, and enrolled at the Norwegian Institute of Technology on 1 September 1939 — the day World War II began. In April 1940, the war reached Norway, with Nazi Germany invading and occupying the country. Sørbye participated in the Norwegian Campaign as a telegrapher, but the Norwegian forces in Trøndelag capitulated by 10 May 1940.

In September 1940, the British Secret Intelligence Service established two stations for radio communication in occupied Norway; the so-called Skylark A was led by Sverre Midtskau in Oslo while Skylark B was led by Erik Welle-Strand in Trondheim. As students formed the backbone of the Skylark B group, Sørbye joined. Other members were Bjørn Rørholt and Einar Johansen. Chemistry professor Leif Tronstad also helped as well. Egil Reksten later took over as leader. Skylark B established regular contact with the intelligence in London in 1941 and helped provide information on German troop and naval movements, as well as vital information about German activity at the Vemork heavy water plant.

In September 1941, however, Gestapo managed to track the Skylark B transmitting activity. Sørbye was arrested by the Nazi authorities, and was first held in Vollan prison. He was then incarcerated at Møllergata 19 from 27 September 1941 to 16 January 1943, and then at Grini concentration camp until 29 July 1943. He was then shipped to Germany and the Nacht und Nebel camps. He spent much time in Natzweiler. Despite health problems, he survived until the end of World War II, and was brought home with the White Buses. Reksten survived as well, but seven of the eleven detainees associated with Skylark died. Sørbye was decorated with the King's Medal for Courage in the Cause of Freedom and the Defence Medal 1940–1945.

== Post-war life ==
Sørbye resumed his studies, and finally graduated from the Norwegian Institute of Technology in 1948. He was hired by the Norwegian Defence Research Establishment, and stationed at their radar in Bergen. During the 1950s he stayed abroad to research; at the UK Post Office Research Station in 1951 and the SHAPE Air Defence Technical Centre (SADTC) from 1957 to 1960. In 1964 he was hired as a lecturer in telephone technology at the Norwegian Institute of Technology. After a period as professor of communication technology at the Technische Hogeschool Twente (nowadays: University of Twente) from 1970 to 1972, he was a professor of telematics at the Norwegian Institute of Technology from 1972 to his retirement in 1987. He was a fellow of the Norwegian Academy of Technological Sciences.

After his retirement he has spent much time as a guide with the White Buses, work for which he was awarded a King's Medal of Merit in 2015. He also practised as a radio amateur. His wife Ruth was a skilled geologist. Sørbye died on 15 September 2016.
