= Hagbarth Schjøtt Jr. =

Norwegian resistance member (1920–2001)

Hagbarth Schjøtt Jr. (25 February 1920 – 2001) was a Norwegian resistance member during World War II and later businessperson.

He was a son of businessperson Hagbarth Schjøtt Sr. Before the Second World War he took a tailor's education. When the war reached Norway on 9 April 1940, with the German invasion, Utne volunteered and fought for Norway in the battles of Southern Norway. After Norway capitulated, he was a co-founder of the resistance group "Theta". The group was self-initiated in a circle of friends, but they lacked contacts, knowledge and materials to actually conduct intelligence work. Other members of the group running "Theta" were Bjarne Thorsen, Kristian Ottosen, Helmer Dahl, Leif Utne and Jan Dahm. A radio transmitter was set up in December 1941, with its headquarters at the famous seaside location Bryggen. "Theta" is best known for notifying the Allies in January 1942 about the presence of the German battleship Tirpitz in Åsenfjorden in Trøndelag.

"Theta" was unveiled in 1942, and the members had to flee Norway. Schjøtt hid in a ship that sailed to Oslo, and from there he fled via Sweden to the United Kingdom. From 1942 to the war's end in 1945 he served on a motor torpedo boat operating out of Shetland.

After the war he ran a business in ready-made clothing. He was a board member of the Federation of Norwegian Industries. After he lost his wife, he involved himself in the Norwegian Cancer Society. He died in 2001.
