= Einar Johansen =

Norwegian resistance member (1915–1996)

Oliver Einar Johansen (15 August 1915 – 16 October 1996) was a Norwegian engineer and resistance member during World War II. He is known as a member of the illegal radio group Skylark B, and after this was discontinued he set up new radio posts in Tromsø and the rest of Northern Norway. He was highly decorated.

== World War II ==
Johansen hailed from Tromsø. He studied at the Norwegian Institute of Technology when World War II reached Norway. Nazi Germany invaded and occupied the would-be neutral country in April 1940. Johansen participated briefly in the Norwegian Campaign as a telegrapher, and returned to Trondheim after the conventional Norwegian armed forces capitulated.

In September 1940 the Secret Intelligence Service established two stations for radio communication; the so-called Skylark A was led by Sverre Midtskau in Oslo while Skylark B was led by Erik Welle-Strand in Trondheim. A four-man team of leaders were shipped from the British Isles to Florø; they then split up and Erik Welle-Strand and associate Finn Juell went to Trondheim. Einar Johansen joined the group, other members were Bjørn Rørholt, Baard Gunnar Hjelde, Olav Skeie and Haakon Sørbye. The chemistry professor at the Institute of Technology, Leif Tronstad, helped out as well. Egil Reksten later took over as leader. Skylark B established regular contact with the intelligence in London in 1941, and helped spread messages about German troop and naval movements as well as vital information about German activity at Vemork heavy water plant.

In September 1941, however, Gestapo managed to track the Skylark B transmitting activity. Egil Reksten and ten were arrested and shipped to Nacht und Nebel camps. Johansen escaped to England via Sweden. However he wanted to continue the resistance, and returned to his hometown, Tromsø. He landed in the spring of 1942, following several failed attempts. Here he operated a radio station under the codename "Upsilon" and he was instrumental in dealing a blow to the German battleship Tirpitz on 22 September 1943 (Operation Source). Information on Tirpitz had been collected by Johansen's brother, Torbjørn Johansen, and transmitted by Einar Johansen.

At the same time, a new operation was underway. The Norwegian submarine Ula, commanded by Sigurd Valvatne, delivered ten radio transmitters with associated equipment on 5 September 1943. The ten radios were picked up south of Tromsø, and became a network codenamed "Venus". No more than six radios were operative at any time, but this outbalanced the German efforts to track down the transmitters. The Venus network played a role when the German battleship Scharnhorst was sunk in late 1943. Another station reported on the repair of Tirpitz, which re-entered action in 1944, only to face continuous attacks. It was ultimately sunk in November 1944.

== Honours and awards ==
Johansen was decorated with the Norwegian War Cross with Sword and the Defence Medal, and the British Distinguished Service Order and Distinguished Service Cross. He was thus the highest decorated Secret Intelligence Service officer in Norway. Also, the area "Johansenbotnen" in Queen Maud Land was named after him.

== Post-war life ==
After the war Johansen finally graduated from the Norwegian Institute of Technology. Despite health problems sustained during the war, including a carbon monoxide poisoning and tuberculosis, he worked as an engineer in Televerket in Arendal. He lived in Hisøy. A book about his war efforts, Den skjulte hånd, was written by Dag Christensen and released as late as 1990. He died in October 1996.
