= Theta (SIS radio group) =

"Theta" was a radio communications group that operated in Bergen, Norway during the German occupation of Norway, communicating with the British Secret Intelligence Service (SIS). The group was operative from December 1941 to June 1942.

== Background ==
The "Theta" group developed among young students in Bergen. A central person was the amateur radio operator Jan Dahm, a student at the Technical school in Bergen. He had been arrested in June 1940, but was released due to a court decision 28 August 1940. The same trial saw the first death sentences for resistance work in Norway (Lund, Rendedal and Solem), but their sentences were subsequently changed to prison. Following his release, Jan Dahm was still under the Gestapo's supervision, but eventually learned to know their methods, and also built his own radio transmitter. One of Dahm's advisors on radio technology was electronics engineer Helmer Dahl at the Chr. Michelsen Institute. Another important contact and advisor was Major Mons Haukeland, district leader of Milorg.

== Contact with SIS ==
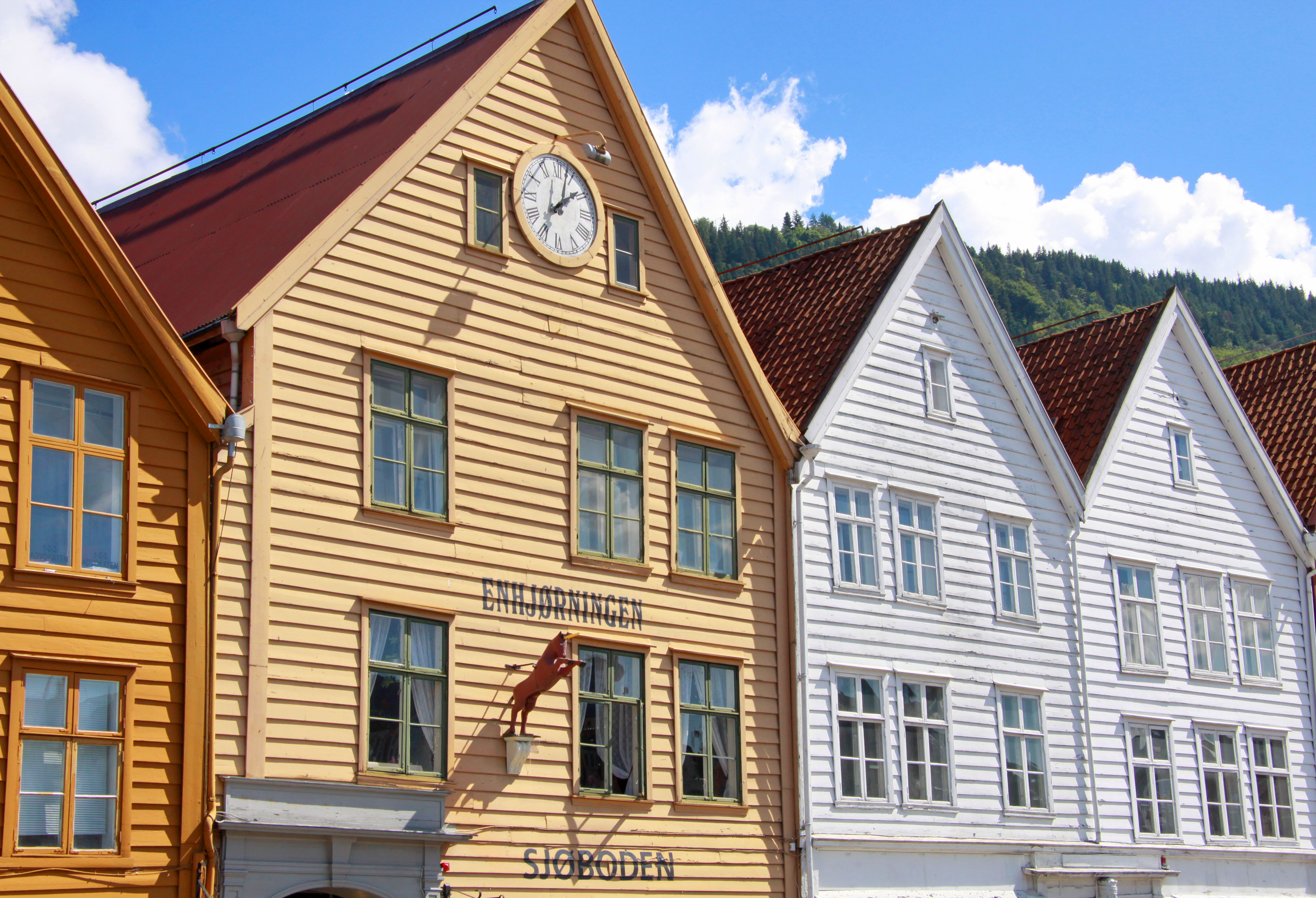
Theta's headquarters was a secret, hidden room in Enhjørningsgården at Bryggen, Bergen.

The group was already in possession of radio equipment and expertise. In order to establish contact with London, high school student Bjarne Thorsen travelled to Great Britain with the refugee ship Duen in October 1941. He returned to Bergen in November, bringing a transmitter, code and schedule. The group in Bergen had prepared a secret room in an old building at Bryggen, which they used as headquarters. The equipment was kept at the headquarters, but brought elsewhere during transmissions. The group had regular radio contact with SIS from end of December 1941. However, there were problems, as a German radio station interfered in the traffic, pretending to represent the London Central, using the same call-sign and asking for repetitions over and over. A new crystal, with a different frequency, was brought in from London to Bergen in January, and after this the problem with the German station disappeared.

== Reports ==
The "Theta" group acquired information from several sources. A telegram sent 16 January reported on a large ship with destroyers sailing into the Trondheimsfjord, and on 23 January 1942 "Theta" reported that the battleship Admiral von Tirpitz, along with six destroyers and submarines had been observed in Åsenfjorden, the inner reaches of the Trondheimsfjord. These messages prompted SIS to send Bjørn Rørholt to Trøndelag to establish the station "Lerken", with the primary goal of reporting on the German ship movements. The "Theta" group also obtained inside information from the new submarine harbour in Laksevåg, and they informed on the Telavåg burning. The group cooperated with other organizations and received large amounts of information, but this was also a security problem.

== End of operation ==
During spring 1942 the group received information that turned out to be misleading or wrong. This misinformation was later tracked to one particular source, an Abwehr agent with the cover name "Gulbrandsen", who was also a marine officer and ship's master. However, the SIS also had an agent inside the Abwehr who sent a warning to England, and "Theta" was subsequently warned. Nevertheless, group member Kristian Ottosen was arrested on 25 June 1942, while Jan Dahm and operator Wenche Stenersen escaped to Sweden. Months later, in a massive raid at Bryggen on 17 October, the secret room was discovered, and a couple of the other group members were arrested. Jan Dahm and Bjarne Thorsen were in London at the time, ready to be sent back to Bergen to continue the group's activities, but after the October raid these plans were abandoned.

== Members of Theta ==
- Sigurd Gran Blytt
- Jan Dahm (Leader of the group. Responsible for coding the telegrams, along with Rolf Utne, and after his departure Wenche Stenersen. Fled to Sweden in July 1942, and further to Britain, where he was trained as radar officer, and served at the naval base in Shetland.)
- Wenche Stenersen Holm (Took over as coder when Rolf Utne left the group. Fled to Sweden in July 1942, and further to Britain, where she served with the Norwegian Armed Forces in exile.)
- Jacob Landsvik (Telegrapher, responsible for sending coded messages, but for security reasons he did not know the code. He was arrested in November 1942, and transferred as NN prisoner to the Natzweiler concentration camp in December 1943, but survived the war.)
- Otto Kaurin Nilsen (Continued resistance work after the dissolution of Theta. He was arrested in December 1944. He was heavily tortured, and sentenced to death in May 1945, but was not executed because the war ended shortly after the sentence.)
- Frank Olsen (Caretaker of the warehouse building "Enhjørningsgården" at Bryggen, where Theta's headquarters were hidden. He was arrested in November 1942, and died in the Dautmergen concentration camp in November 1944.)
- Kristian Ottosen (Link to various information providers. He was arrested in June 1942, transferred to the Sachsenhausen concentration camp in December, and eventually as NN prisoner to the Natzweiler concentration camp and other camps. He survived the war. Published a book about Theta in 1983, and has written several books about Norwegian prisoners in German custody during World War II.)
- Hagbarth Schjøtt, Jr.
- Bjarne Thorsen (Co-founder of Theta. Travelled to UK, received training in radio, telegraphy, and secret codes, and returned to Norway with a transmitter.)
- Leif Utne (Co-founder of Theta. Travelled to UK, and was subsequently stationed in Shetland.)
- Rolf Utne (Left the group in February 1942, for training with the air force in Little Norway, Canada. Died in July 1944, as crew member in a bombing raid over Germany.)
- Markus Wiig

=== Advisors ===
- Helmer Dahl
- Mons Haukeland

== See also ==
- Theta Museum, a museum reconstructing the group's hidden room in Bergen
