= Leif Utne =

Norwegian resistance member (1919–2004)

Leif Utne (1919 – 25 August 2004) was a Norwegian resistance member during World War II and later a physician.

== Early life ==
Utne was born in Bergen as the son of a physician. He finished secondary school in 1938, and enrolled in medicine studies at the University of Oslo in the same year.

== World War II ==
When World War II reached Norway on 9 April 1940, with the German invasion, Utne volunteered and fought for Norway in the battles of Southern Norway. After Norway capitulated, he was a co-founder of the resistance group "Theta". The group was self-initiated in a circle of friends, but they lacked contacts, knowledge and materials to actually conduct intelligence work. Other members of the group running "Theta" were Bjarne Thorsen, Kristian Ottosen, Helmer Dahl, Hagbarth Schjøtt, Jr. and Jan Dahm. Two members were sent to the United Kingdom: Leif Utne and Bjarne Thorsen. Utne travelled via Sweden, while Thorsen crossed the Norwegian Sea. Thorsen returned with the necessary equipment, and a radio post was finally set up in December 1941, with its headquarters at the famous seaside location Bryggen.

By that time, however, Leif Utne had become stationed in Scotland as a part of the Royal Norwegian Navy-in-exile. He operated out of Lerwick in a motor torpedo boat squadron, among others together with Hugo Munthe-Kaas. Utne was decorated with the Norwegian War Medal.

== Later career ==
After the war, Utne resumed his medicine studies. He graduated with the cand.med. degree in 1950. From 1961 he was a specialist in skin diseases. He worked at Haukeland University Hospital, in his own clinic as well as the St. Franciscus Hospital in Florida, Bergen. He trained students belonging to the University of Bergen. He also continued working with the navy, and reached the rank of commander in 1976.

He chaired the local branch of the Norwegian Medical Society from 1974 to 1975. He was also active in Doktorklubben av 1959, Nasjonalhjelpen and the sports club Bergens TF. He was married and had two daughters. He died in August 2004 at Haukeland University Hospital.
