= Jan Dahm =

Norwegian resistance member (1921–2013)

- Born: 5 April 1921
- Died: 16 February 2013 (aged 91)
- Occupation(s): Resistance member and engineer

Jan Dahm (5 April 1921 – 16 February 2013) was a Norwegian resistance member during World War II. He was among the first group of people to be subject to court-martial during the German occupation of Norway, and later initiated and headed the Secret Intelligence Service group Theta, which operated in Bergen from December 1941 to June 1942.

== German court-martial ==
At the German attack on Norway in April 1940 Jahn Dahm, who was born on 5 April 1921, was a nineteen-year-old engineering student at Bergens Tekniske Skole. He had been an eager radio amateur and a member of Bergen Radio Relé Liga for years, and at home he also had a workshop for building radios. On 25 June 1940, while he had an examination at the school, he was taken to the Gestapo office in Bergen, where he was confronted with equipment taken from his home and told he would be charged with espionage. On 28 June he was transported by bus from Bergen to Møllergaten 19 in Oslo with ten other arrestees.

The German court-martial started in Oslo on 22 August 1940. The court in Oslo consisted of the 3rd Senate of the Deutsches Reichskriegsgericht (Reich Military Tribunal) in Berlin, and the prosecutor sought the death sentence for the six defendants, according to paragraphs 2 (espionage) and 89 (treason) of the German penal code. On 28 August three of the six defendants, travelling agent Konrad Rendedal, Colonel Gabriel Lund and Doctor Odd Solem, were sentenced to death; Jan Dahm and another defendant were set free, as the charges could not be proved; and policeman Erling Staff was sentenced to five years in prison. This was the first court-martial in Norway after the German occupation, and the first death sentences in Norway since 1876. The death sentences were later reduced to five years imprisonment (Festungshaft). Jan Dahm could go back home, but had to report to the Gestapo every second week.

== SIS radio station Theta ==
Dahm continued his studies at Bergens Tekniske Skole, but was under Gestapo supervision. He noticed that he was often observed by unknown persons, but eventually learned how to escape his shadows. He made contacts with undercover resistance members, such as physicist and radio expert Helmer Dahl and Mons Haukeland, the district leader of the Bergen department of Milorg. Along with some friends he also started to prepare a secret room in a building at Bryggen, which could be used as a working room and cover. As the group had expertise in radio transmission, the next step was to establish contact with Allied forces. Group member Bjarne Thorsen travelled by boat to Lerwick and managed to establish contact with the Secret Intelligence Service in London. Thorsen returned to Bergen bringing a radio transmitter, secret codes and schedules.

The station was called Theta, and started operating in December 1941. Among the notable messages transmitted by Theta was a report on the battleship Tirpitz. The Theta group operated until June 1942, when group member Kristian Ottosen was arrested. Following this arrest, Dahm fled to Sweden via Bodø, Fauske and Junkerdalen, together with fellow member Wenche Stenersen. Dahm was further taken to Britain for briefing. He was later trained as radar officer, and eventually served at the naval base in Shetland.

== Post-war ==
Dahm graduated from Bergens Technical School in 1947, and ran an engineering company in Bergen from 1950. He died in February 2013.
