= Erling Storrusten =

Norwegian business executive (1923–2018)

Erling Storrusten (28 September 1923 – 10 June 2018) was a Norwegian business executive.

He was born in Tretten. He served as managing director of the Norway Travel Association from 1963 to 1970 and of the Norwegian Automobile Federation from 1971 to 1986, and edited the 1989 and 1992 editions of the road atlas NAF Veibok. As a student during the occupation of Norway by Nazi Germany, Storrusten was a member of the clandestine intelligence organization XU, and among his activities was supervision of activities at the Wehrmacht headquarters in Lillehammer.

He resided at Østerås. He died in 2018 at the age of 94.
