= Erling Welle-Strand =

20th-century Norwegian writer and resistance member

Erling Welle-Strand (25 October 1916 – 24 May 2013) was a Norwegian writer and resistance member. He was born in Bergen. His father was a novelist and journalist who was known to be antisemitic. However, Welle-Strand, belonged to a radical wing of the Norwegian Labour Party before World War II. When Norway was invaded by the Germans in 1940, Welle-Strand left school and fought for his country until it was occupied, then fled for Shetland in 1941, where he worked as a journalist for the Norwegian government-in-exile for eight months before attending military college. After graduating from military college and some officer cadet training, Welle-Strand served in the Norwegian resistance. For his service, he was decorated with the Defence Medal 1940–1945, the War Medal and the Haakon VII 70th Anniversary Medal. After the war, he resumed his studies and graduated with a degree in history, and began working in the travel industry as a freelance writer. Welle-Strand wrote several books about tourism and, for fifteen years, edited the road map issued by the Norwegian Automobile Federation. In his later career, he also wrote books about the Second World War.

== Early life ==
He was born in Bergen as a son of novelist and journalist Edvard Welle-Strand (1884–1964) and teacher Elsa Kielland, née Lindhé (1888–1979). Erling's father was a sub-editor in a local newspaper, Bergens Aftenblad, and was also known to some as an antisemitic writer. Himself, Erling Welle-Strand belonged to the "radical wing of the Labour Party" before World War II. He grew up in Bergen and finished his secondary education at Bergen Cathedral School in 1935. He worked briefly as a press secretary for the theatre Den Nationale Scene before studying at the University of Oslo.

== World War II ==
In 1940, Norway was invaded by Nazi Germany, and his studies were interrupted; instead he fought in Valdres in the Norwegian Campaign. He participated in a Norwegian victory at Bagn, but Norway lost in the end and was occupied. Welle-Strand fled the country for Shetland in 1941, together with Reidar Kvinge and Per Hysing-Dahl. He worked as a journalist for the Norwegian government-in-exile for eight months before attending military college. He graduated from military college in 1943, then spent some time in an Officer Cadet Training Unit before serving on a Norwegian Motor Torpedo Boat (MTB). He was then enrolled into the Norwegian Independent Company 1, and on 31 December 1944 he was parachuted over Hadelandsåsen to work as an agent in his home country. He established an anti-sabotage training school at nearby Svartåsseter. His main task was to secure important facilities, including electricity and telecommunications, in case the Germans lost the war and would withdraw using a scorched earth tactic. The operation was called the "Foscot plan", and Welle-Strand cooperated with Milorg's District 13. His nom de guerre was "David".

He was decorated with the Defence Medal 1940–1945, the War Medal and the Haakon VII 70th Anniversary Medal. His brother Erik Welle-Strand was a resistance member too.

== Post-war life ==
After the war he resumed his studies, and graduated with a cand.philol. degree in history in 1945. He took up a career in the travel industry, in the organization Norway Travel Association (Norwegian: Landslaget for reiselivet). He headed their office in Stockholm from 1946 to 1950 and the office in Oslo from 1950 to 1955. From 1955 he worked as a freelance writer, but still in the field of tourism and travelling. He issued books about travelling with Hurtigruten in 1953 and 1966, and several books about domestic tourism. The book Reiseliv og samfunn was written for the 75th anniversary of the Norway Travel Association in 1978. Between 1964 and 1979 he edited six editions of the road map issued by the Norwegian Automobile Federation, NAFs veibok. In his later career he began writing books about the Second World War. Three collections of war stories came in 1989, 1990 and 1991. In 2000 he released Vi vil verne vårt land. Antisabotasje i Norge 1944–1945.

Welle-Strand was married twice, first to a daughter of aide-de-camp and sports leader Nikolai Ramm Østgaard, then to language teacher. His daughter Ragni (b. 1946) was married to famous writer Edvard Hoem from 1982 to 1995.
