= Bjarne Thorsen =

Norwegian resistance member (1922–2001)

Bjarne Winter Thorsen (9 January 1922 – 15 February 2001) was a Norwegian resistance member during World War II and later a naval officer.

== World War II ==
When World War II reached Norway on 9 April 1940, with the German invasion, Thorsen was a student in secondary school. As early as 1940, he got together with friends and decided to take up resistance work. The group was self-initiated, but they lacked contacts, knowledge and materials to actually conduct intelligence work. Two of them were sent to the United Kingdom: Bjarne Thorsen and Leif Utne. Utne travelled via Sweden, while Thorsen crossed the Norwegian Sea on the vessel Duen. After five weeks of training in radio, telegraphy, and secret codes, he returned to Norway with a transmitter. He landed on Sotra and went from there to Bergen. The radio communication post "Theta" was established on 4 December 1941, with its headquarters at the famous seaside location Bryggen. The radio was operated out of a secret room in a house owned by the Dahm family; Jan Dahm came to be the main operator. Thorsen returned to England when "Theta" was up and running. He had to return in early 1942 with new radio gear to make tracking by German intelligence harder. In total, he crossed the Norwegian Sea six times during this period.

Among other things, "Theta" identified the presence of the German battleship Tirpitz in Norwegian waters, a highly important contribution to the Battle of the Atlantic. Tirpitz was located near Trondheim, far from Bergen, but "Theta" got the information from a scout travelling with the Hurtigruten. The message was sent on 17 January 1942, and spurred a series of Royal Air Force attacks on the battleship. "Theta" later sent information about the German cruiser Prinz Eugen. Kristian Ottosen was also a member of the group running "Theta", as was Helmer Dahl. After a request from Edward Victor Appleton, Thorsen helped Dahl and his family flee to the United Kingdom in April 1942 on the vessel Borghild.

The Abwehr quickly became suspicious of "Theta" and tried to pinpoint its exact location. They managed to interfere with a transmission, attempting to trick the resistance members with a fake message. German authorities finally unveiled "Theta" in October 1942, while conducting a razzia towards Bryggen, but most of the members managed to flee. Kristian Ottosen had already been captured, imprisoned, and tortured for information. Another member died in German captivity, while a third group member died elsewhere as a pilot. Thorsen continued his Allied war service as a telegrapher, and also attended the Norwegian Naval Academy.

He was decorated with the St. Olav's Medal With Oak Branch, reportedly as the youngest Norwegian. He also received the King's Medal for Courage.

== Later career ==
After the war, Thorsen served in the Royal Norwegian Navy. He reached the rank of commander. He also spent some time working for the Governor of Svalbard.

From the 1980s, he was a part of a project group aiming to register imprisoned Norwegian war sailors. In 1990, he published the book Usynlige soldater, about the Secret Intelligence Service agents of Norway, together with Bjørn Rørholt. It was considered as providing hitherto unknown information. Thorsen lived in Eiksmarka, and died in February 2001.
