= Bjørn Rørholt =

Norwegian resistance member and engineer

- Born: 27 August 1919; Aker, Norway
- Died: 3 May 1993 (aged 73); Oslo
- Occupations: Engineer; Military officer
- Parent: Arnold Rørholt
- Relatives: Vera Henriksen (cousin)
- Awards: War Cross with Sword; Distinguished Service Order; Order of St. Olav

Bjørn Arnold Rørholt DSO (27 August 1919 – 3 May 1993) was a Norwegian engineer, military officer, Secret Intelligence Service agent and resistance member during World War II.

== Early life ==
Rørholt was born in Aker Municipality as the son of military officer Arnold Rørholt (1884–1961) and his wife Luise Fredrikke Lund (1891–1965). He was a first cousin of Vera Henriksen and a great-grandson of Friedrich Roscher.

Rørholt finished his secondary education in 1937, and enrolled at the Norwegian Institute of Technology in 1939. After a short time, he was drafted for compulsory military service. Not long after, when the Norwegian Military Academy opened for an extra influx of recruits, Rørholt enrolled there.

== World War II ==
When World War II reached Norway on 9 April 1940, with the German invasion, the Military Academy cadet Rørholt helped fighting to repel the invaders. However, after the Norwegian Campaign Germany emerged victorious, and occupied Norway. After a short time as a prisoner-of-war, Rørholt returned to the Institute of Technology in autumn 1940.

In September 1940, the Secret Intelligence Service established two stations for radio communication; the so-called Skylark A was led by Sverre Midtskau in Oslo while Skylark B was led by Erik Welle-Strand in Trondheim. Egil Reksten later took over for Welle-Strand. Skylark B established regular contact with the intelligence in London in 1941, and helped spread messages about German troop and naval movements as well as vital information about German activity at Vemork heavy water plant. In September 1941, however, Gestapo managed to track the Skylark B transmitting activity. Rørholt travelled to Oslo as a decoy, he then was nearly captured but escaped. His father was held hostage until November 1942. Rørholt fled to Sweden via Iddefjord, accompanied by Knut Haukelid who had been involved in the Skylark A group in Oslo. Rørholt then travelled from Stockholm to Great Britain. Initially, he was withdrawn from active service because he might be known to the Germans.

From 1942, the question of the German battleship Tirpitz became important. The presence of the ship in the Atlantic Ocean would be highly hazardous for the Allies; thus the commanders wanted to track the ship's movements. A radio post named "Theta" was organized by Bjarne Thorsen, but the Allies wanted more. Rørholt returned to Norway in 1942 to operate the SIS radio station "Lerken". Four radio transmitters were placed in the Trondheim area, one of them at the German-fortified Agdenes. Rørholt held a false identity as an insurance agent, and was thus allowed to travel freely with the alleged purpose of visiting customers. He was even escorted by the authorities from Agdenes to Trondheim. When Tirpitz was moved towards Northern Norway, "Lerken" was superseded by "Upsilon" and the network "Venus". Einar Johansen was the central person here. The group of Norwegian resistance members that surveilled Tirpitz, referred to themselves as Barnepikene, "The Babysitters". The radio post in Agdenes continued after the 1944 sinking of Tirpitz, and was operated by Magne Hassel.

From November 1942, Rørholt was transferred to the department 4 (FO IV) of the Ministry of Defence, chairing the education of Norwegian radio agents in Great Britain. From 1944 to 1945, he participated in the liberation of Northern Norway, being one of the key figures on the Norwegian side together with Bernt Balchen. Also, the world-famous explorer Thor Heyerdahl was his second-in-command.

Rørholt was awarded the War Cross with Sword and the Distinguished Service Order for his war contributions. Reportedly, he was the first Norwegian to receive the Distinguished Service Order. He was also a Commander of the Royal Norwegian Order of St. Olav.

== Later career ==
After the war Rørholt travelled to the United States. He had a position at the Norwegian Embassy in Washington DC, and later continued his engineering studies at the Harvard University, specializing in binary and communication technology. He started working for the Norwegian Armed Forces (Sambandsregimentet) in 1949. He constructed the chiffer machine ETCRRM which was produced at Kjeller and used by NATO. In the military, he reached the rank of Colonel in 1958. At that time he was the youngest Colonel in Norway, aged 39.

In 1985 he constructed a battery-driven, portable radar for blind people. The device, nicknamed "The Bat", was based on ultrasound and mimicked the bat's sensory system. He wrote two memoir books from his World War II experiences, Amatørspionen "Lerken" ("Amateur Spy 'The Lark'", 1985) and Usynlige soldater ("Invisible Soldiers", 1990)—the latter together with Bjarne Thorsen. He was married to Mia Sverdrup Thygeson from 1949, and to Elsa Lundh from 1978.
