= Arnold Rørholt =

Norwegian military officer (1884–1961)

Arnold Rørholt (14 June 1884 – 1961) was a Norwegian military officer, known as a resistance member during World War II. He was also the secretary-general of the Royal Norwegian Automobile Club for many years.

== Career ==
He was born in Hamar. He finished his secondary education in 1901 and graduated from the Norwegian Military Academy in 1905. He also graduated from the Norwegian Military College in 1907, and started working for the General Staff. He worked in Oslo Militære Samfund from 1909 to 1926. From 1918 to 1920 he was the secretary of the Association of Regular Officers (Norwegian: Hærens fastlønte offiserers landsforening) and edited their periodical Vår Hær. In 1926 he moved to the Royal Norwegian Automobile Club, where he was secretary-general from 1929 to 1949 and chief executive from 1949 to 1953. He edited their magazine Motorliv as well as their yearbook. After retiring from the Royal Norwegian Automobile Club he was hired in the Norwegian Armed Forces department of war history. He had already released a book about Oslo Militære Samfund; in 1925. In 1955 he became chairman of the pensioners' association Landslaget for statspensjonister, succeeding Per Skotte. Rørholt was deputy chairman from 1953 to 1955.

In the military he reached the rank of lieutenant colonel, and was a member of the illegal resistance group Milorg during the German occupation of Norway. He became a member of the inner circle Rådet in May 1943, but had to flee to Sweden in January 1945. He continued the resistance from Stockholm until the May 1945 liberation of Norway, and was a member of the police troops in Sweden. His son Bjørn, whom he had together with Luise Fredrikke Lund (1891–1965), was also involved in the resistance, as a Secret Intelligence Service officer. When Rørholt's group Skylark B was unveiled by the Germans in September 1941, Arnold Rørholt was arrested by the Nazi authorities as a hostage. He was incarcerated at Møllergata 19 from 12 September 1941 to 23 April 1942, then at Grini concentration camp until 9 November 1942.

== Decorations ==
Arnold Rørholt held the Defence Medal 1940–1945. He was decorated as a Knight of the Order of the Polar Star, Knight First Class of the Order of the Dannebrog, Commander of the Order of the Lion of Finland, and also with the Order of the Crown of Italy.
