= Joke Folmer =

Dutch resistance member (1923–2022)

- Born: Johanna Maria Folmer; 9 July 1923; Hoofddorp, Netherlands
- Died: 11 December 2022 (aged 99); Schiermonnikoog, Netherlands
- Occupation: Resistance member

Johanna Maria "Joke" Folmer (9 July 1923 – 11 December 2022) was a Dutch resistance member during World War II.

== Life ==
Shortly after her birth, Folmer moved with her parents to the Dutch East Indies where she lived until the age of 16. At the time of the 1940 German invasion of the Netherlands she was seventeen years old and attended the lyceum in Zeist. By delivering homework to a Jewish friend, she came into contact with the Dutch resistance. She became a courier for the Fiat Libertas group. She smuggled over three hundred people across the border, including 120 Allied pilots.

In September 1943 the group was betrayed. Folmer was sentenced to death and imprisoned in, among others, the Oranjehotel, the prison in Utrecht and Herzogenbusch concentration camp. Her execution was prevented by the evacuation of the camp on Dolle Dinsdag. As a Nacht und Nebel prisoner, she went to multiple German prisons. Because she was moved so often, her death sentence papers were never at the prison she was in. She was liberated in Waldheim by the Russians on 6 May 1945. Her return journey to the Netherlands is described in the book The Walls Came Tumbling Down by Jet Roosenburg.

After the war, she and Nel Lind organized reunions in which British and Canadian air force veterans traveled the escape routes from the Netherlands to the Swiss or Spanish borders.

Folmer died in Schiermonnikoog on 11 December 2022, at the age of 99.

== Awards ==
American Medal of Freedom with golden palm

- (United States) Medal of Freedom with golden palm (1946)

After the death of Peter van den Hurk in 2014, Folmer was the only living Dutch bearer of the Medal of Freedom with golden palm.

- (United Kingdom) George Medal (1947)
- (Netherlands) Bronze Lion (1951)
- (Netherlands) Resistance Memorial Cross
- (Netherlands) Medal of honor Schiermonnikoog (2020)

== Legacy ==
In 2020 Omrop Fryslan made a documentary of 2 episodes about her.
