= Sverre Haug =

Norwegian resistance member

Sverre Haug (22 July 1907 – 25 October 1943) was a Norwegian resistance member and pilot who died during World War II.

He was born in Stokke in 1907. He was married and had one child, and had taken radio and telegraph education. In the Norwegian campaign, he participated for his country as an interpreter during the battles in Northern Norway, where soldiers from Norway, the United Kingdom, Poland and France fought.

In September 1940 the Secret Intelligence Service established two stations for radio communication; the so-called Skylark A was led by Sverre Midtskau in Oslo while Skylark B was led by Erik Welle-Strand in Trondheim. Haug travelled the Norwegian Sea with the cutter Nordlys, landed in Florø on 15 September together with Erik Welle-Strand, Sverre Midtskau and Finn Juell. They split up there, and Haug continued to Oslo with Midtskau. Later heavy water saboteur Knut Haukelid also became involved, summoned by Per Jacobsen with the words "Sverre Haug has returned, and he needs you". Following technical difficulties in the initial phase, Midtskau and Haug travelled to England with a cutter from Ålesund to fix the problem. Midtskau's return to Norway by parachute was a failure, and Skylark A failed with it. Skylark B established a connection which lasted from February to September 1941.

Haug had to flee Norway for his resistance work. Via Sweden he joined the Royal Air Force in the United Kingdom, but died in October 1943 near RAF Leuchars when his plane crashed. He was buried in Skjee. He was awarded the Norwegian War Medal posthumously.
