= Theta Museum =

Museum in Bergen, Norway

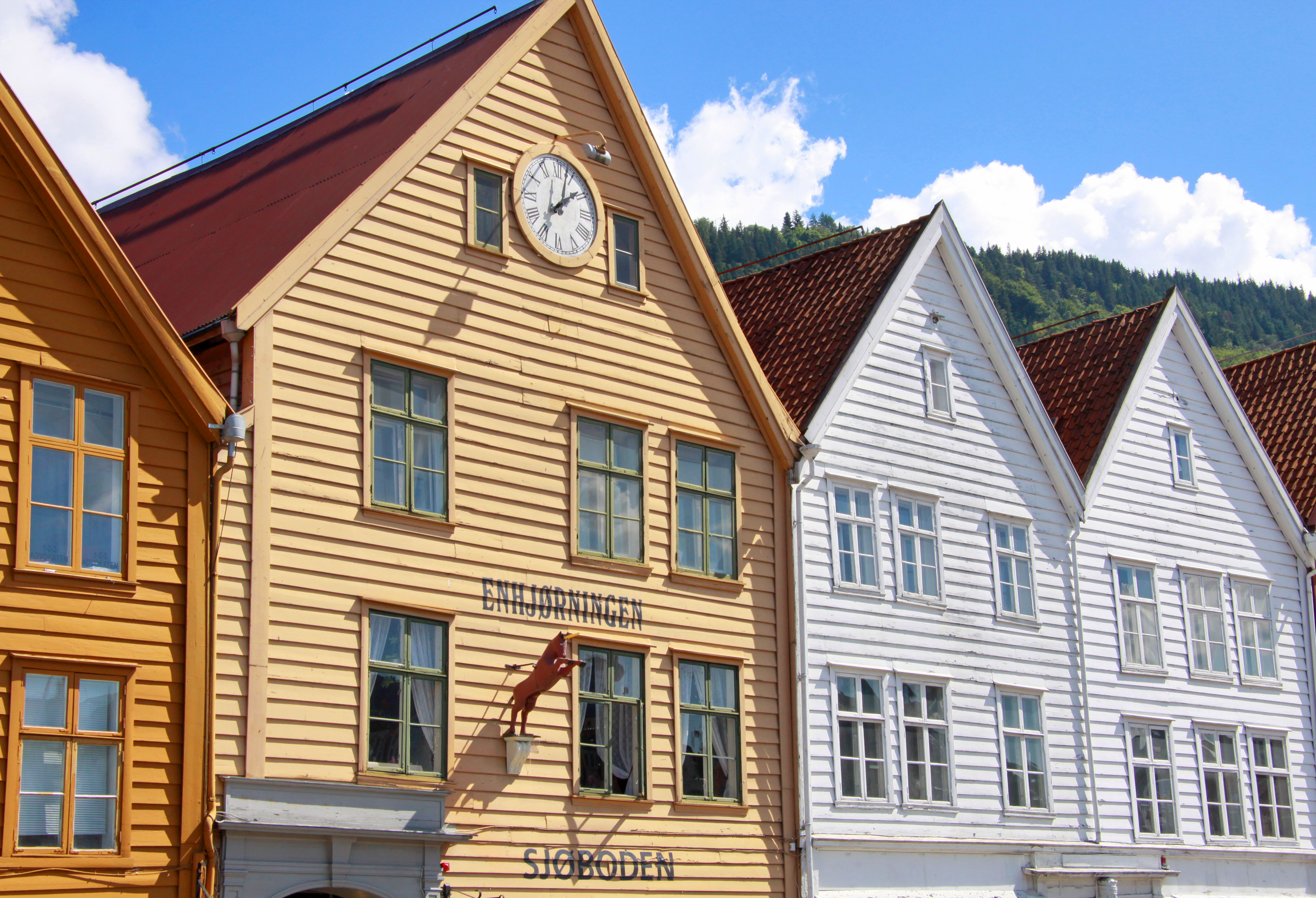
Thetamuseet is located in Enhjørningsgården

The Theta Museum (Norwegian: Thetamuseet) is a museum in Bergen, Norway. It is a one-room museum in a room that was used by the Norwegian resistance group known as the Theta group to send radio messages to England under the Nazi German occupation during World War II. The room was opened to the public in 1982, and is the smallest museum in Norway.

== Background ==
The room is in one of the buildings on the Bryggen wharf (Enhjørningsgården), where it was well hidden from German officials. The young members of the Theta group used their engineering training to create a special electrical locking system to conceal the door to the room. By that time, most doors in the buildings on Bryggen had been sealed and closed off, which made it difficult to find hidden rooms.

== German raid ==
On 17 October 1942, the German forces carried out a raid at Bryggen, and the room was accidentally discovered. A rotten floorboard on the floor above gave way when a soldier stepped on it leading to discovery of the well-hidden room. None of the members of the Theta group was captured. The group members had prepared a large batch of TNT in case the room was discovered and searched. The TNT was in a cupboard with a trigger on the door. The charge did not go off; if it had, it is said that the whole of Bryggen would have been blown up.

After the raid the room was damaged and everything inside had been removed. For the museum, objects have been assembled that approximate the furnishings during the war. Objects from the war were donated for this purpose by people all over Norway. The only original objects in the room are a coffee table, a Hallicrafter receiver, a homemade HF transmitter, copies of intelligence reports submitted by Norwegian agents, and tasking messages received from London. At 16 square metres (170 sq ft), it is the smallest museum in Norway.

== Guided tour ==
The guided tour of the museum is intended to give a sense of what it was like to secretly work against the Nazi German occupiers, and information about the radio transmissions made from the room and how among other things they enabled the British Navy to sink the Tirpitz.
