= Edvard Welle-Strand =

Norwegian journalist and novelist

Edvard Welle-Strand (1 May 1884 – 10 March 1965) was a Norwegian journalist and novelist.

== Career ==
Edvard Welle-Strand was born in Vesterålen, Norway. Welle-Strand wrote newspaper articles from his district in 1900, sending them to the newspaper Nidaros in Trondhjem. In 1905, he was hired by Nidaros. He later studied journalism in Berlin. In 1909 he published his first book Fra havskjær og fjellvidde, a collection of tales. He worked in Hvepsen, and from 1910 to 1936, he worked as a subeditor in the newspaper Bergens Aftenblad. From time to time, he had assignments as a foreign correspondent; covering Petrograd in 1917 and Finland in 1918. He also contributed to Mikal Sylten's anti-Semitic magazine Nationalt Tidsskrift and to Sylten's likewise tinted Christmas magazine Nordisk Jul. Welle-Strand, who was a staunch anti-Semite and believed in Jewish financial domination conspiracies, was one of the most prolific non-pseudonymous contributors apart from Sylten himself, and had his most active period in Nationalt Tidsskrift in 1921. He also continued to publish novels, especially during the 1910s and 1920s.

From 1937 to 1940 he edited and published the magazines Vi Reiser and Fiskermagasinet, and from 1940 to 1941 Bergens Illustrerte. Also, his last known contribution to Nationalt Tidsskrift came in 1940, a short story. In 1940 Norway was invaded and occupied by Nazi Germany, but the Nazi authorities arrested Welle-Strand on 14 January 1942 as a "hostage", and incarcerated him at Grini concentration camp from 16 January to 23 March. Edvard's son Erling Welle-Strand, whom he had together with Elsa Kielland Lindhé (1888–1979), was a member of the Norwegian resistance movement; from 1944 in the Norwegian Independent Company 1. Edvard's granddaughter Ragni (b. 1946) was married to famous writer Edvard Hoem from 1982 to 1995. Another son Erik Welle-Strand was a resistance member too.

Welle-Strand continued to publish books after the war, from the 1950s concentrating on non-fiction books about Knut Hamsun. His last recorded release came in 1964.
