= Møgster =

Møgster is a Norwegian surname. Notable people with the surname include:

- Abelone Møgster (1883–1975), Norwegian resistance fighter
- Halvor Møgster (1875–1950), Norwegian sailor
- Ole Rasmus Møgster (1958–2010), Norwegian businessman
