= Theta group =

Theta group may refer to:

- Theta subgroup of the modular group
- Theta (SIS radio group), a radio communications cell in the Norwegian Resistance
- Theta representation of the Heisenberg group
