= Egil Reksten =

Norwegian engineer (1917–2009)

Egil Reksten (3 May 1917 – May 30, 2009) was a Norwegian engineer and resistance member during World War II. He is best known as leader of the illegal radio post Skylark B.

== World War II ==
Reksten was born in Kristiania (now Oslo), Norway. He was the son of Saron Eriksen Reksten (1875-1955) and his wife Inger Jacobsen (1887-1987). His father was the Rector at Kamper School (Kampen skole) in the Gamle Oslo district of Oslo.

He attended the Norwegian Institute of Technology, and graduated in chemistry in 1941. His professor was Leif Tronstad, a well-known resistance member during the German occupation of Norway since April 1940. In September 1940 the Secret Intelligence Service established two stations for radio communication; the so-called Skylark A in Oslo led by Sverre Midtskau and Skylark B in Trondheim led by Erik Welle-Strand. Skylark B was operated by students at the Institute of Technology, and after technical difficulties in the initial phase, they established regular contact with the intelligence in London in January 1941. Leif Tronstad was also affiliated with the group. When Welle-Strand left the country, Reksten took over as leader of Skylark B.

Among others, the group helped spread vital information about German activity at Vemork heavy water plant. The link between heavy water and a German nuclear energy project was established later. After less than a year, however, Gestapo managed to track the Skylark B transmitting activity. Reksten was arrested by the Nazi authorities in September 1941. He was incarcerated at Møllergata 19 from 14 September 1941 to 10 March 1942, then at Akershus Fortress, then at Grini concentration camp from 7 July to 29 July 1943. He was then shipped to Germany with eleven others. Seven of these people died, but after stays in six different Nacht und Nebel camps, Reksten returned to Norway after the war's end. He was decorated for his efforts.

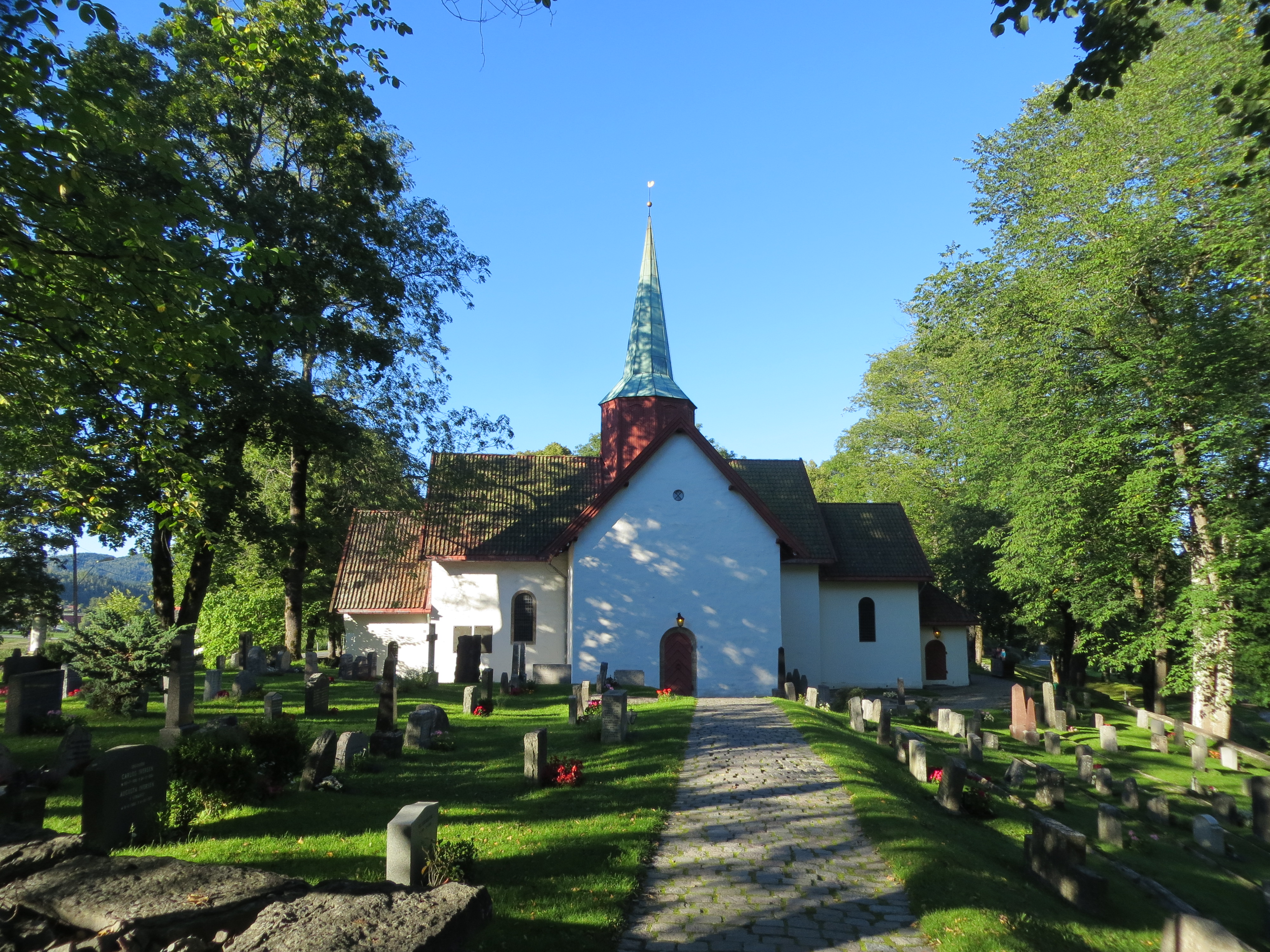
Haslum Church at Bærum

== Post-war life ==
In 1947 Reksten started his own engineering company, Argo, together with Erik Welle-Strand and other friends. He spent the rest of his professional career there. He was married, and celebrated his diamond wedding in 2007. He resided in Asker in Akershus, Norway. He died in 2009 and was buried in the churchyard of Haslum Church at Bærum in Akershus .

== Related reading ==
- Ottosen, Kristian (1995) Nordmenn i fangenskap 1940-1945 (Oslo: Universitetsforlaget) ISBN 82-00-22372-8
