= Sverre Midtskau =

Norwegian resistance member (1914–1987)

Sverre Midtskau (23 September 1914 – 18 December 1987) was a Norwegian resistance member during World War II. He is best known as leader of the illegal radio post Skylark A.

== World War II ==
On 9 April Nazi Germany invaded Norway as a part of World War II. Midtskau became involved in the subsequent fighting in Rjukan. He later went to Northern Norway, and when Norway was overran by Germany, he fled to England together with the Royal Family and prominent politicians.

In September 1940 the Secret Intelligence Service established two stations for radio communication; the so-called Skylark A was to be led by Sverre Midtskau in Oslo while Skylark B was led by Erik Welle-Strand in Trondheim. Midtskau travelled the Norwegian Sea with the cutter Nordlys, landed in Florø on 15 September together with Erik Welle-Strand, Sverre Haug and Finn Juell and continued to Oslo with Haug. Following technical difficulties in the initial phase, Midtskau and Haug travelled to England from Ålesund to fix the problem. Upon his return to Norway, Midtskau was to be parachuted over Telemark in February 1941 with a new radio. However, he landed at Øyfjell instead of the designated spot near Langesæ, and in addition the radio was smashed to the ground. Midtskau then contacted Max Manus, a resistance agent of post-war fame. However, this led to his arrest in Manus' home. He was imprisoned in Åkebergveien.

The Skylark B group in Trondheim managed to establish regular contact with the intelligence in London in January 1941. They had valuable assistance from Leif Tronstad, and provided vital information. In September the same year, however, Gestapo managed to track the Skylark B transmitting activity. Welle-Strand had left Norway, but the new leader Egil Reksten and others were arrested and shipped to Nacht und Nebel camps. Gestapo then learned Midtskau's name from the subsequent investigation—having gained access to the secret code, they managed to decipher the transmissions from Skylark B. Midtskau was then sent to the prison Møllergata 19 for torture.

He managed to escape in December 1941 when a prison assistant managed to copy the keys belonging to a German guard. According to Max Manus, this prison assistant was the imprisoned resistance member Kolbein Lauring. Midtskau and two others fled Møllergata and hid in rural Lommedalen. He stayed in a lodge there until January 1942. He then fled, skiing, via Trysil and Sweden to England. He quit active service, but spent the rest of the war as a skiing instructor for Allied soldiers as well as an interrogation instructor.

== Post-war life ==
In 1968 he issued the book London svarer ikke, the title referring to the initial difficulties with radio communication in 1940. He had to use a wheelchair from 1981 onwards, and died in December 1987, aged 73, from a stroke.
