= Hagbarth Schjøtt Sr. =

Hagbarth Schjøtt Sr. (9 May 1894 – 9 September 1994) was a Norwegian businessperson.

He was born in Bergen, and took his education in England and the United States. His family ran a company named H. E. Schjøtt & Co, and Schjøtt started his own company named Hagbarth Schjøtt in 1926. His younger brother Olvar Schjøtt was employed as a manager. The company gradually expanded, and at its peak it had 600 employees. The company went bankrupt in 1993.

Schjøtt was also a board member of the Federation of Norwegian Industries. He had five children, among them the resistance member and businessperson Hagbarth Schjøtt Jr. In 1994 he celebrated his hundredth birthday.
