= The Walls Came Tumbling Down (memoir) =

First edition (publ. Viking Press)

The Walls Came Tumbling Down is a memoir written by Henriette Roosenburg. It was published in 1957. She and her friends Nel, Joke and Dries were political prisoners in Waldheim. The story tells about their voyage back home from their release by a Russian soldier on May 6, 1945 until their reunion with their families in the Netherlands at June 13, 1945.

== Characters ==
- Jet Roosenburg ("Zip") – 28-year-old female narrator, caught March 1944.
- Nel Lind – 30, female, caught November 1943
- Joke Folmer (pronounced "Yo-kuh") – 20, female, caught May 1944
- Dries – 26, male, caught April 1944
