= Abelone Møgster =

Norwegian businesswoman, war resister (1883–1975)

Abelone Karia Larsdatter Møgster (29 October 1883 – 25 November 1975) was a Norwegian businesswoman and war resister arrested by German Nazi occupiers during World War II. She survived three years in Nazi camps. She lived on the island of Møkster in the Austevoll Municipality.

== Biography ==
Abelone Møgster was born in Austevoll, Søndre Bergenhus, Norway, and started a general store in a boathouse in Vestrevågen on the island of Møkster in Austevoll in 1910. In the 1920s, she borrowed money to build a road to Naustvågen further south on the island to build a new store there, where she believed the harbor conditions were much better. After the road was built, she built a quay and a new general store in Naustvågen. This was ready in the latter part of the 1920s, probably in 1927. From this general store, she traded with "food and drink," as she herself called it. There, she also ran a fishing reception and regular boat expeditions for fishermen and the island's population. She remained unmarried.

== War effort ==
On 25 June 1942, Møgster was arrested by the Gestapo who accused her of helping English-speaking people escape from German-occupied Norway to Great Britain. She was captured together with her brother Karl Møgster, known as "old los Møgster," and both were subjected to severe torture and transferred to Bergen District Prison (Prisoner number: 1461). She was later sent to Grini detention camp (Prisoner number: 6185). From there, the journey continued to the women's camp Ravensbrück concentration camp (Prisoner number: 20136) as a Nacht und Nebel (called NN-Deported) prisoner. At the turn of 1944/1945, she was transferred to the Mauthausen concentration camp in Austria, which was a pure extermination camp.

In mid-March 1945, she was evacuated on the last of the diplomat Folke Bernadotte's white buses that rescued Scandinavian prisoners from Mauthausen to take them home. The journey then took her via Denmark and on to a rehabilitation camp in Sweden. At the beginning of June 1945, she finally returned to Norway and Møkster. When she arrived, she was 62 years old and weighed just 38 kilograms (84 lb).

She died 25 November 1975 in Austevoll, Hordaland, Norway, where she was born.

== Awards and honors ==
Abelone Møgster was the oldest Norwegian woman to survive captivity as a Nazi prisoner. In captivity she was nicknamed "The Angel from Ravensbrück" and after the war she received the King's Medal of Merit in gold for her service to Norway.

At the turn of the millennium, Abelone Møgster was one of ten people nominated for the award as Westerner of the Century by the newspaper Bergens Tidende.

In 2011, the fishing vessel named in her honor, MS Abelone Møgster, was launched.
