= Oluf Gabriel Lund =

Norwegian military personnel (1873–1966)

Oluf Gabriel Lund (8 May 1873 – 29 November 1966) was a Norwegian military officer.

He was born in Christiania, and graduated from the Military Academy in 1897. He was promoted to captain in 1902, major in 1917, lieutenant colonel in 1924, and colonel in 1929. From 1929 he was in command of the Norwegian 10th Infantry Regiment. In a German court-martial in 1940 Lund was sentenced to death. This was later changed to five years Festunghaftstrafe, and he was released in 1943.

Among his works is Historik for Fjordane regiment from 1931, and Dødsdømt from 1945. He was decorated Knight of the Order of the Dannebrog.

He died in November 1966.
