= NAF Veibok =

Norwegian map book

NAF Veibok is a triennial publication issued by the Norwegian Automobile Federation. The book contains road maps, route descriptions and other road information. The first edition of the book came in 1928. The 29th edition, published in 2010, contains a total of about 800 pages, including an atlas of 136 map pages of a scale of 1:400,000, covering the Norwegian mainland.
