= Åsenfjorden =

Fjord in Trøndelag, Norway

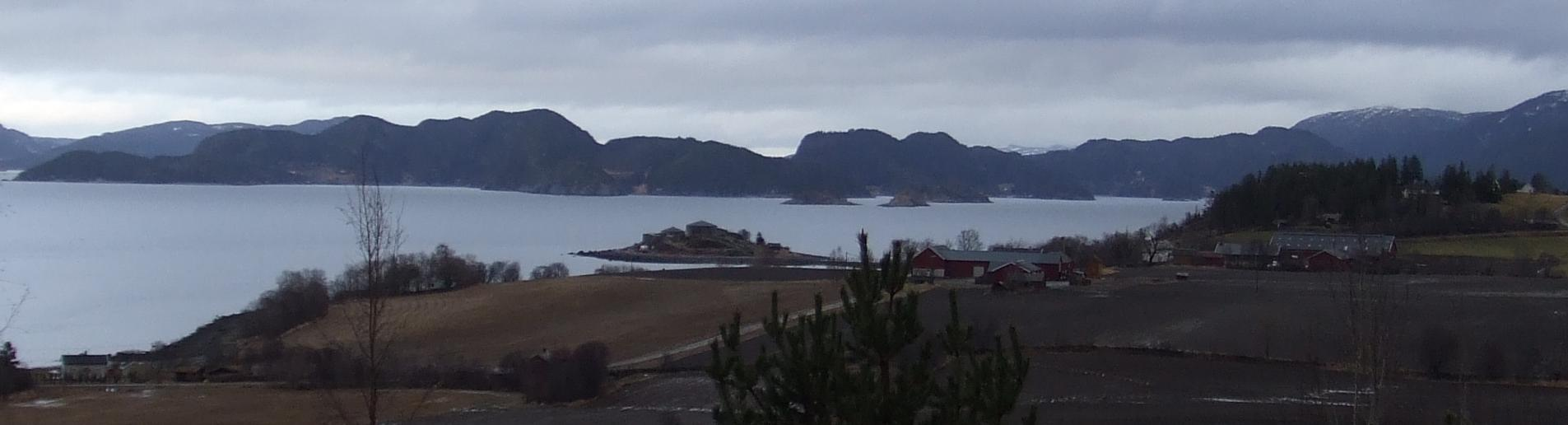
- Åsenfjorden seen from Nordbygda at Skatval in Stjørdal municipality

- Location within Trøndelag Location within Norway
- Interactive map of the fjord
- Location: Trøndelag county, Norway
- Coordinates: 63.55544°N 10.76026°E
- Type: Fjord
- Part of: Trondheim Fjord
- Basin countries: Norway
- Max. length: 15 km (9.3 mi)

Åsenfjorden is a fjord in Trøndelag, Norway. It is a branch of Trondheim Fjord which includes some smaller fjords within it such as the Strindfjorden, Fættenfjorden, and Lofjorden. The fjord is located along the borders of Frosta Municipality, Stjørdal Municipality, and Levanger Municipality.

== See also ==
- List of Norwegian fjords
