= Norwegian Automobile Federation =

Norwegian motoring association

- Norges Automobil-Forbund
- Abbreviation: NAF
- Formation: 21 May 1924; 102 years ago
- Type: Voluntary association
- Headquarters: Etterstad
- Location: Norway
- Members: 488,419 (2018)
- Board of directors: Stig Skjøstad
- Revenue: 400 mil NOK
- Website: naf.no

Norwegian Automobile Federation (Norwegian: Norges Automobil-Forbund, NAF) is a Norwegian association of car owners, established in 1924, and member of Fédération Internationale de l'Automobile. The federation has 73 local chapters and more than 500,000 members. NAF is running a number of test stations, skidpans and camping sites. Among its publications is the monthly magazine Motor and the triannual NAF Veibok.
