= Mons Haukeland =

Norwegian military officer

Mons Olai Haukeland (29 February 1892 – 26 July 1983) was a Norwegian gymnastics teacher and military officer, and district leader of Milorg during World War II until his arrest in 1943. He was imprisoned at Grini concentration camp from 8 to 9 December 1943, then at Sachsenhausen until the camp was liberated. He has been called father of the Norwegian Home Guard, being its general inspector (Norwegian: generalinspektør) from its formation in 1946 to 1958. He was promoted to the rank of major general in 1954.

Haukeland was appointed a Commander of the Royal Norwegian Order of St. Olav in 1959, Commander of the Danish Order of the Dannebrog and of the Swedish Order of the Sword. He was also awarded the Defence Medal 1940–1945 with Rosette, and the Home Guard Medal of Merit.

Haukeland was born in Os Municipality, and was educated as military officer and gymnastics teacher. He worked as a gymnastics teacher in Bergen from 1923 to 1943.
