= Erik Welle-Strand =

Norwegian resistance member

Erik August Lindhè Welle-Strand (2 June 1915 – 17 July 2001) was a Norwegian mining engineer and resistance member during World War II. He is best known as leader of the illegal radio post Skylark B.

== Early life ==
He was born in June 1915 in Bergen. He was a brother of Erling Welle-Strand. As a teenager he was active in the theater (Den Nationale Scene), prior to beginning his compulsory military service in 1935. He also worked briefly as a coal miner for Store Norske Spitsbergen Kulkompani, before enrolling at the Norwegian Institute of Technology in 1936.

== World War II ==
He returned to Bergen in January 1940, stationed at an anti-air battery to guard the Norwegian neutrality in World War II. However, on 9 April Nazi Germany invaded Norway. Welle-Strand became involved in the subsequent fighting, first at the anti-air battery, later during a retreat to the mountains of Hardanger. The Norwegian troops went to Voss and Leikanger; Welle-Strand then parted ways with them and made his way via Finland and Finnmark to Tromsø. He escaped from there to England with the naval ship Heilhorn.

In September 1940 the Secret Intelligence Service established two stations for radio communication; the so-called Skylark A was led by Sverre Midtskau in Oslo while Skylark B was to be led by Erik Welle-Strand in Trondheim. He travelled the Norwegian Sea with the cutter Nordlys, landed in Florø together with Sverre Midtskau, Sverre Haug and Finn Juell and continued to Trondheim with Juell. In this city he had attended the Institute of Technology. Skylark B was operated by students of the institute, and after technical difficulties in the initial phase, they established regular contact with the intelligence in London in January 1941. Members of the group included Haakon Sørbye, Bjørn Arnold Rørholt, Einar Johansen, Baard Gunnar Hjelde and Olav Skeie. Professor of chemistry at the Institute of Technology, Leif Tronstad, was also affiliated with the group.

Among others, the group helped spread vital information about German activity at Vemork heavy water plant. Messages about German troop and naval movements were also sent via Skylark. Welle-Strand was ordered to leave Norway for London in May 1941, and Egil Reksten took over as leader of Skylark B. In September the same year, however, Gestapo managed to track the Skylark B transmitting activity. Egil Reksten and others were arrested and shipped to Nacht und Nebel camps. Reksten survived—barely, while seven of his ten inmates associated with Skylark B died. Welle-Strand continued his resistance while based in the United Kingdom, and participated in raids towards the coast of Western Norway. He quit the military after the war's end in 1945, having gone from second lieutenant to captain in rank in those four years. He was decorated with the St. Olav's Medal With Oak Branch, the Haakon VII 70th Anniversary Medal and the Defence Medal 1940 – 1945.

== Post-war life ==
After the war Welle-Strand started his own engineering company, Argo, together with Reksten and other friends. He founded his own company in Canada in 1951, but later returned to Norway and Argo. Welle-Strand was married and had four children. He lived in Oslo in his later life, and died in July 2001 at Aker Hospital.
