= Helmer Dahl =

Norwegian electrical engineer (1908–1999)

Helmer Hartmann Dahl (17 June 1908 – 29 March 1999) was a Norwegian electrical engineer and director of research at the Chr. Michelsen Institute.

== Biography ==
Dahl was born at Sarpsborg in Østfold, Norway. He was the son of Karl Theodor Dahl (1867–1928) and Catharine Hartmann (1880–1943), He graduated as a civil engineer from the Norwegian Institute of Technology in 1931. He was hired at the Chr. Michelsen Institute in 1935. He worked with physicist Olaf Devik in the development of navigational methods for the coast areas.

He was arrested and later released following the German occupation of Norway in April 1940. Due to German raid on the intelligence station Theta he left Bergen in 1942 for exile in the United Kingdom until 1945. Dahl became the captain of the Norwegian Air Force (1942) and Major (1945). Here he became a part of the Technical Committee of the Norwegian High Command, together with scientists and engineers including Fredrik Møller, Svein Rosseland, Leif Tronstad and Gunnar Randers. The Technical Committee is considered as the precursor to the Norwegian Defence Research Establishment which was established in 1946.

Following the liberation of Norway, Dahl worked at the Norwegian Defence Research Establishment from 1946 to 1949, but then returned to the Chr. Michelsen Institute where he was a research director from 1950 to 1978. From 1950 to 1958 Dahl was chairman of the Acoustic Research Committee.

Dahl was also a member of the board of the Norwegian Broadcasting Corporation from 1945 to 1974. He was a lecturer in technological history at University of Trondheim and was awarded an honorary degree in 1995.
