= Skylark B =

Norwegian resistance radio group

Skylark B was a radio communications group that operated in Trondheim during the German occupation of Norway. The group was established and led by Erik Welle-Strand, who was a student in Trondheim. Preparations were done in 1940, when a transmitter was brought in from the United Kingdom, and the communications were effective from the end of January to September 1941. Their station, called Sealion, was one of two radio stations that maintained the radio communication between Norway and the UK Secret Intelligence Service in this period. The transmitter was located in Herbernheia in the recreational area Bymarka. A large number of telegrams were sent while the group was operational. The group was eventually rolled up by the Gestapo in September 1941. Several of the operators were imprisoned. Eleven members of the Skylark B group were sent to German death camps, and seven of these later died in Germany. Others managed to flee from the country, among these were Leif Tronstad, Einar Johansen, Bjørn Rørholt and Olav Skeie.

== Reports ==
In February 1941, Skylark B reported on German ships in Trøndelag, and on export of iron ore from Narvik. In March, there were telegrams on pyrite shipments from Thamshavn, on large numbers of German troops in Mosjøen, on a seaplane base in Hommelvik, and on German gas ships in Trondheim. During spring 1941, telegrams reported high military activity (German troop movements) which later appeared to reflect preparations for the German attack on the Soviet Union. In May 1941, before the German battleship Bismarck battle, Skylark reported to SIS that three destroyers had arrived in Trondheim. Skylark B also facilitated communication between London and Trondheim regarding the production of heavy water at Vemork.
