= Møllergata 19 =

Building in Oslo, Norway

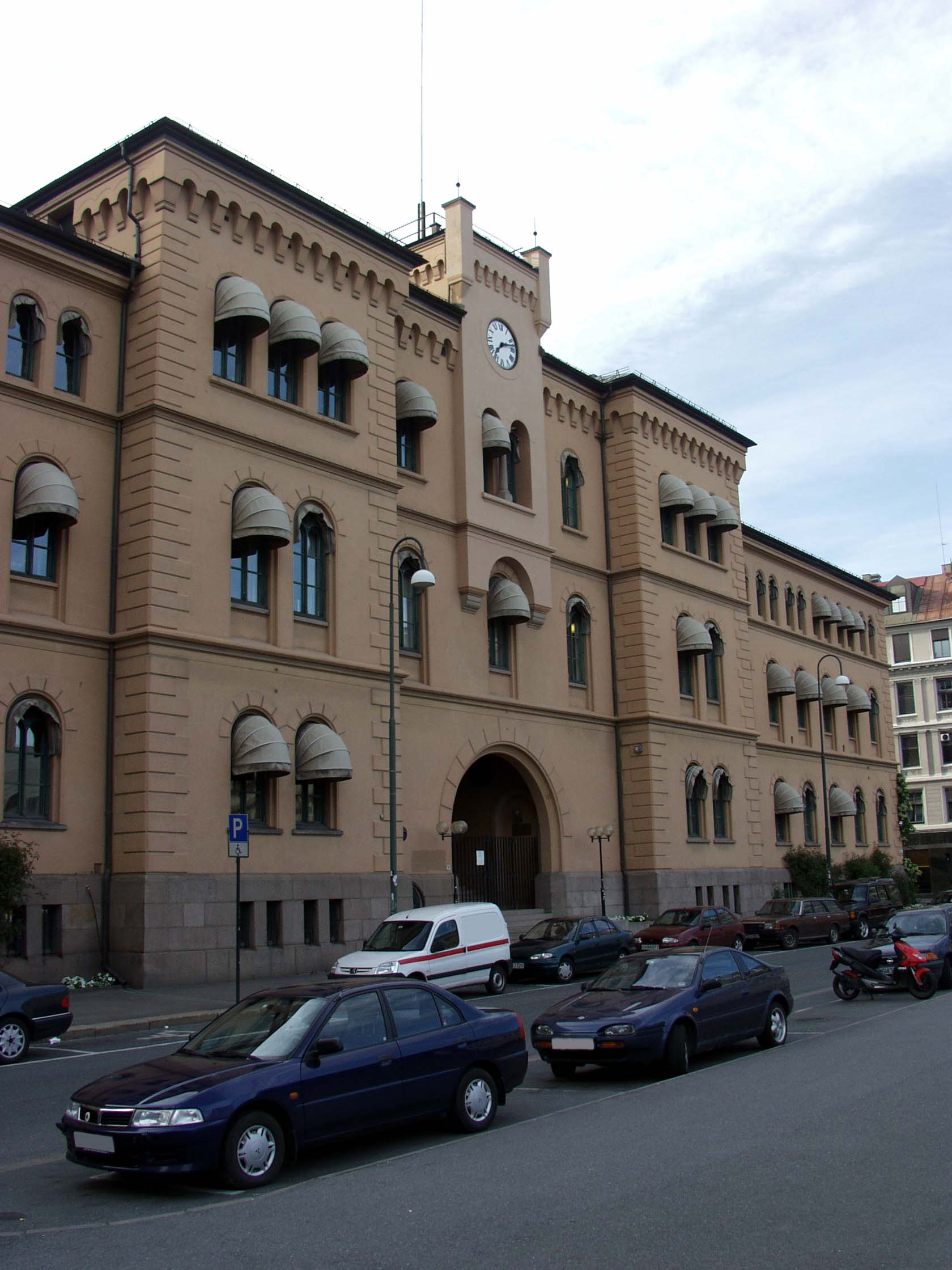
- Møllergata 19 from Youngstorvet
- Interactive map of the Møllergata 19 area

General information
- Architectural style: Romanesque Revival
- Location: Oslo, Norway
- Coordinates: 59.915171°N 10.747708°E
- Construction started: 1862
- Completed: 1866
- Demolished: 1978 (partially)
- Client: Municipality of Oslo

Design and construction
- Architect: Jacob Wilhelm Nordan

Møllergata 19 is an address in Oslo, Norway, where the city's main police station and prison was located. The address gained notoriety during the German occupation from 1940 to 1945, when the Nazi security police kept its headquarters here. This is also where Vidkun Quisling in 1945 surrendered to the legitimate Norwegian government and was imprisoned.

== History ==
Although the site was owned by the city government since the 17th century, it was not until 1857 that the city of Kristiania decided to put the site to use as a center for law enforcement. Based on the drawings by Jacob Wilhelm Nordan, construction for the complex started in 1862 and was finished in 1866.

Facing Youngstorget (which then was called Nytorvet), was the police station and courtrooms; behind these was the jail. A floor was added in the late 1870s. Though some of the capacity was moved to a new prison in Åkebergveien (known as "Bayern"), the structure continued to serve as a prison and central police station until the new police building at Grønlandsleiret was finished. The prison was demolished and replaced with a new office building, and the police station was taken over by the government.

== World War II ==
Immediately upon arriving in Norway, the German army commandeered Møllergata 19 for its own purposes, and the first prisoners were British subjects suspected of being clandestine agents, arrested on 10 April. The following day, a Norwegian was also detained for showing contempt for the German forces. By August, the prison was solely used for prisoners arrested by the Nazi authorities. The official capacity was 145 prisoners, but the Germans kept up to 550 at a time. Prisoners held here were often subject to interrogation and torture at Victoria Terrasse.
