= Kristian Ottosen =

Norwegian resistance member and writer (1921–2006)

Kristian Ottosen (15 January 1921, Solund – 1 June 2006, Oslo) was a Norwegian non-fiction writer and public servant.

While still a student, he was also active in the Norwegian resistance movement during World War II and was imprisoned as a Nacht und Nebel inmate. He was imprisoned in Veiten from June to July 1942, then in Bergen from July to September, then in Grini concentration camp from September to December. From December 1942 to June 1944 he was in Sachsenhausen concentration camp, then until September 1944 in Natzweiler-Struthof. He was then in Dachau concentration camp for three days, and Ottobrunn for one day. He was lastly in Dautmergen from September to November 1944 and Vaihingen until the war's end.

After the war, he finished his studies at the University of Bergen, where he became the leader of the Det Norske Studentersamfund first in Bergen, and then as a full-time employee at the University of Oslo. He was the manager of the Foundation for Student Life in Oslo from 1950 to 1979. He led the commission that recommended the founding of regional university colleges throughout Norway and for establishment of the Norwegian State Educational Loan Fund. He also chaired the board of NRK from 1972 to 1979, and Nationaltheatret from 1981 to 1989.

After he retired, Ottosen wrote a series of historical accounts from World War II. These included memoirs from his work in the Norwegian resistance as well as thorough historical surveys of Norwegians who were arrested and detained by Nazi authorities during the war. For this work he was honored with the Fritt Ord Honorary Award in 2004, made commander in the Royal Norwegian Order of St. Olav, and named honorary member of the Norwegian Labour Party.

== Notable writings ==
Ottosen's works include:

- Ottosen, Kristian (1983). Theta Theta : et blad fra motstandskampens historie, 1940-1945 (in Norwegian). Bergen: Universitetsforlaget. ISBN 82-00-06823-4. - about the work of the resistance group known as Theta Theta.
- Ottosen, Kristian (1989). Natt og tåke : historien om Natzweiler-fangene (in Norwegian). Oslo: Aschehoug. ISBN 82-03-16108-1. - about the Nacht und Nebel prisoners in the Natzweiler concentration camp, with an emphasis on the Norwegians held there.
- Ottosen, Kristian (1990). Liv og død : historien om Sachsenhausen-fangene (in Norwegian). Oslo: Aschehoug. ISBN 82-03-16484-6. - about the Sachsenhausen concentration camp.
- Ottosen, Kristian (1991). Kvinneleiren : historien om Ravensbrück-fangene (in Norwegian). Oslo: Aschehoug. ISBN 82-03-16791-8. - about the Ravensbrück concentration camp, primarily for women.
- Ottosen, Kristian (1993). Bak lås og slå : historien om norske kvinner og menn i Hitlers fengsler og tukthus (in Norwegian). Oslo: Aschehoug. ISBN 82-03-26000-4. - about the deportation and imprisonment of Norwegian men and women in prisons throughout Germany.
- Ottosen, Kristian (1994). I slik en natt : historien om deportasjonen av jøder fra Norge (in Norwegian). Oslo: Aschehoug. ISBN 82-03-26049-7. - about the deportation and fate of Jews from Norway.
- Ottosen, Kristian (1995). Nordmenn i fangenskap 1940-1945 (in Norwegian). Oslo: Universitetsforlaget. ISBN 82-00-22372-8. - an authoritative list of Norwegian individuals who had been held in German captivity during World War II.
- Ottosen, Kristian (1996). Ingen nåde : historien om nordmenn i japansk fangenskap (in Norwegian). Oslo: Aschehoug. ISBN 82-03-26127-2. - about Norwegian prisoners held in Japanese captivity during World War II.
