= Nacht und Nebel =

Directive issued by Adolf Hitler on 7 December 1941

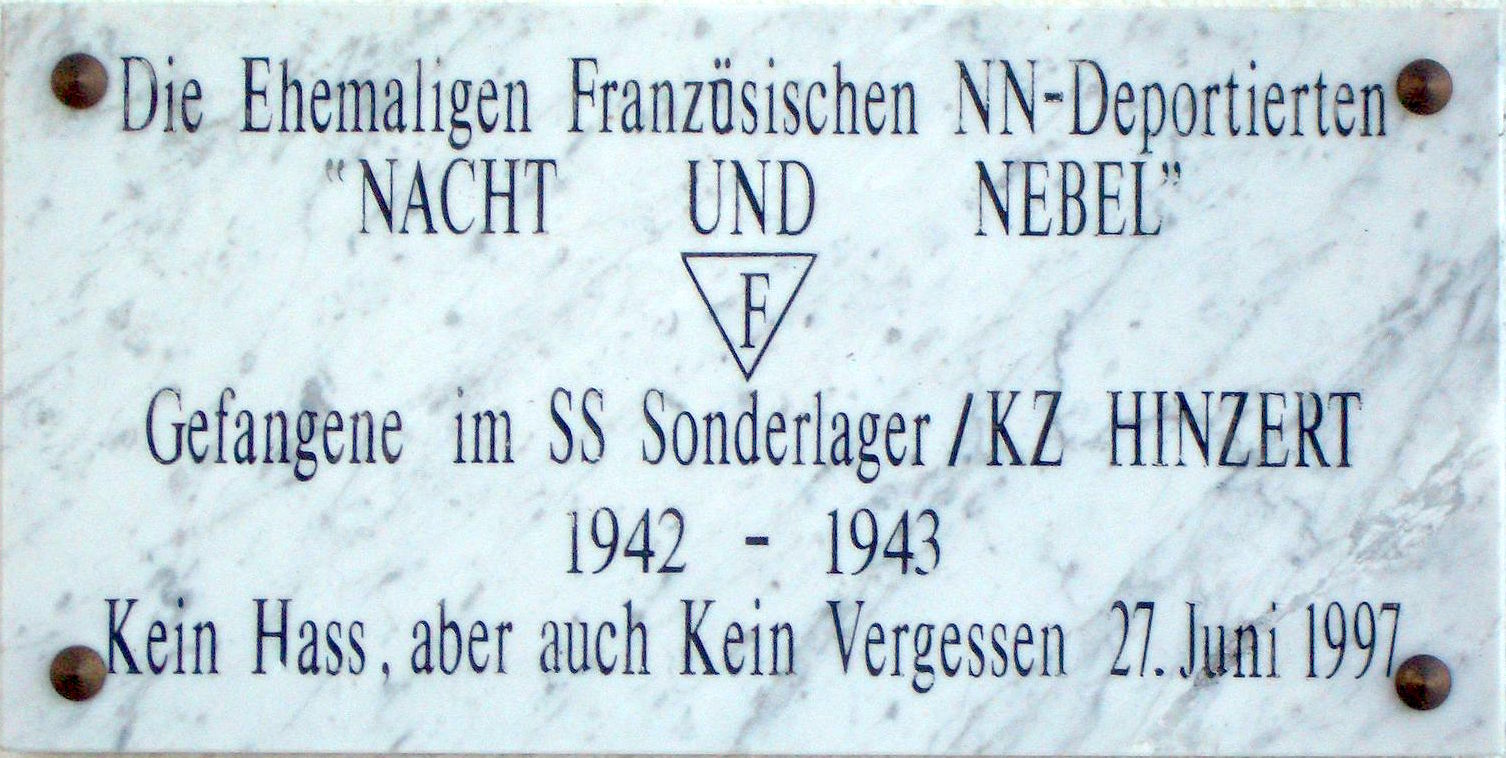
Commemorative plaque for the French victims at Hinzert concentration camp, showing the expressions Nacht und Nebel and "NN-Deported"

Nacht und Nebel (German: [ˈnaxt ʔʊnt ˈneːbl̩]), meaning Night and Fog, also known as the Night and Fog Decree, was a directive issued by Adolf Hitler on 7 December 1941 targeting political activists and resistance "helpers" in the territories occupied by Nazi Germany during World War II, who were to be imprisoned, executed, or made to disappear into the "night and fog" of the Reich. The family and the population remained uncertain as to the fate or whereabouts of the alleged offender against the Nazi occupation power. Victims who disappeared in these clandestine actions were often never heard from again.

== Name ==
The alliterative hendiadys Nacht und Nebel (German for "Night and Fog") is documented in German since the beginning of the 17th century. It was used by Wagner in Das Rheingold (1869) and has since been adopted into everyday German (e.g., it appears in Thomas Mann's The Magic Mountain). It is not clear whether the term Nacht-und-Nebel-Erlass ("Night and Fog directive") had been in wide circulation or used publicly before 1945. The designation "NN" was sometimes used, however, to refer to prisoners and deportees ("NN-Gefangener", "NN-Häftling", "NN-Sache") at the time.

== Background ==
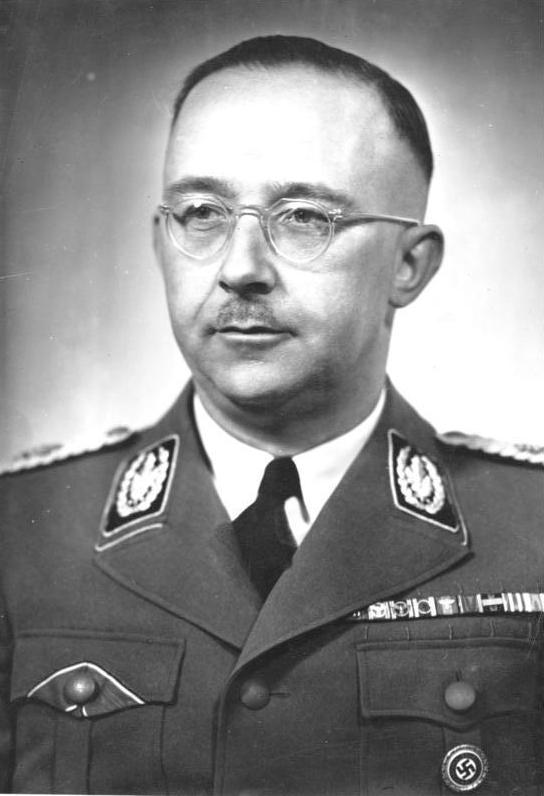
Heinrich Himmler issued orders for Nacht und Nebel in 1941.

Even before the Holocaust gained momentum c. 1941, the Nazis had begun rounding up political prisoners – both within Germany and in occupied Europe. Most of the early prisoners were of two sorts: they were either political prisoners of personal conviction or of the belief, whom the Nazis deemed in need of "re-education" to Nazi ideals, or resistance leaders in occupied western Europe.

Until the issuing of the Nacht und Nebel decree in December 1941, prisoners from Western Europe were handled by German soldiers in approximately the same way as by other countries: according to international agreements and procedures such as the Geneva Conventions. However, the AB-Aktion (German: Außerordentliche Befriedungsaktion, lit. 'Extraordinary Operation of Pacification') in German-occupied Poland (carried out from 1940 onwards) presaged and paralleled the activities of Nacht und Nebel, operating with similar methods.

Hitler and his upper-level staff made a critical decision not to conform to what they considered unnecessary rules, and in the process, abandoned "all chivalry towards the opponent" and removed "every traditional restraint on warfare". During the Nuremberg trial of the High Command of the Wehrmacht (OKW) in 1945–1946, the head of the legal department in the OKW, Ministerial Director and General Dr. Rudolf Lehmann, testified that Hitler had literally demanded that opponents of the regime, who could not be immediately given a short trial should be brought across the border to Germany in the "Night and Fog" and remain isolated there.

On 7 December 1941, Reichsführer-SS Heinrich Himmler issued the following instructions to the Gestapo:

After lengthy consideration, it is the will of the Führer that the measures taken against those who are guilty of offenses against the Reich or against the occupation forces in occupied areas should be altered. The Führer is of the opinion that, in such cases, penal servitude or even a hard labor sentence for life will be regarded as a sign of weakness. An effective and lasting deterrent can be achieved only by the death penalty or by taking measures which will leave the family and the population uncertain as to the fate of the offender. Deportation to Germany serves this purpose.

At the Armed Forces High Command, Generalfeldmarschall Wilhelm Keitel had also received a so-called "Führer's decree" from Hitler on 7 December 1941, and while this order was not documented in writing, Keitel immediately passed it on to the appropriate authorities in the form of "guidelines" and likewise issued a secret decree containing more detailed instructions for its implementation. Essentially, the decree was about how to more effectively combat the increasing resistance actions in the territories occupied by Germany in Western Europe after the June 1941 beginning of the Axis war against the Soviet Union. The "Night and Fog" decree originally concerned only nationals of France, Belgium, the Netherlands, Luxembourg, and Norway. However, eventually some of those imprisoned under the Nacht und Nebel Erlass came from Poland, Hungary, Greece, Yugoslavia, Slovakia, and Italy.

On 12 December, Keitel issued a directive explaining Hitler's orders:

Efficient and enduring intimidation can only be achieved either by capital punishment or by measures by which the relatives of the criminals do not know the fate of the criminal.

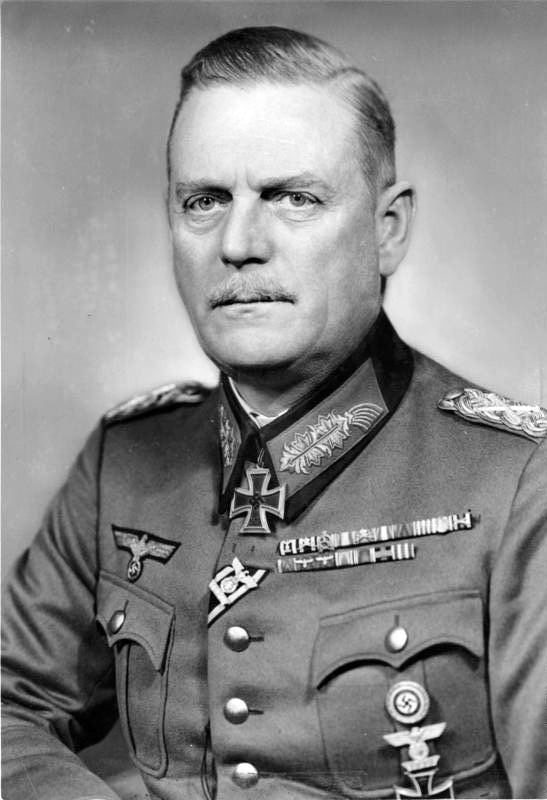
Wilhelm Keitel expanded the repressive Nacht und Nebel program to countries under military occupation.

Three months later Keitel further expanded on this principle in a February 1942 letter stating that any prisoners not executed within eight days were to be handed over to the Gestapo and:

to be transported to Germany secretly, and further treatment of the offenders will take place here; these measures will have a deterrent effect because – A. The prisoners will vanish without a trace. B. No information may be given as to their whereabouts or their fate.

Reinhard Heydrich's Sicherheitsdienst (Security Service; SD) was given the responsibility to oversee and carry out the Nacht und Nebel decree. The SD was mainly an information-gathering agency, while the Gestapo operated as the main executive agency of the political police system. The decree aimed to intimidate local populations into submission, by denying friends and families of seized persons any knowledge of their whereabouts or their fate. The prisoners were secretly transported to Germany and vanished without a trace. In 1945, abandoned SD records were found to include merely names and the initials "NN" (Nacht und Nebel); even the sites of graves were unrecorded. The Nazis even coined a new term for those who "vanished" in accordance with this decree; they were vernebelt—"transformed into mist". To this day, it is not known how many people disappeared as a result of this decree. The International Military Tribunal at Nuremberg held that the disappearances committed as part of the Nacht und Nebel program were war crimes which violated both the Hague Conventions and customary international law.

Himmler immediately communicated Keitel's directive to various SS stations, and within six months, Richard Glücks sent the decree to the commanders of concentration camps. The Nacht und Nebel prisoners were mostly from France, Belgium, Luxembourg, Denmark, the Netherlands, and Norway. They were usually arrested in the middle of the night and quickly taken to prisons hundreds of kilometres away for questioning, eventually arriving at concentration camps such as Natzweiler, Esterwegen, or Gross-Rosen, if they survived.

Natzweiler concentration camp, in particular, became an isolation camp for political prisoners from northern and western Europe under the decree's mandate. When the concentration camps in the east and west of German-occupied Europe were dissolved in the face of the advancing Allied armies and their inmates evacuated – often on cruel death-marches – centrally located camps such as Dachau and Mauthausen at the end of World War II filled with thousands of NN prisoners, whose special status was largely lost in the chaos of the last months before the liberation.

Up to 30 April 1944, at least 6,639 persons had been arrested under Nacht und Nebel orders. Some 340 of them may have been executed. The 1956 film Night and Fog, directed by Alain Resnais, uses the term to illustrate one aspect of the concentration-camp system as it morphed into a system of labour- and death-camps.

== Text of the decrees ==
Directives for the prosecution of offences committed within the occupied territories against the German State or the occupying power, of 7 December 1941.

Within the occupied territories, communistic elements and other circles hostile to Germany have increased their efforts against the German State and the occupying powers since the Russian campaign started. The amount and the danger of these machinations oblige us to take severe measures as a deterrent. First of all the following directives are to be applied:

I. Within the occupied territories, the adequate punishment for offences committed against the German State or the occupying power which endanger their security or a state of readiness is on principle the death penalty.

II. The offences listed in paragraph I as a rule are to be dealt with in the occupied countries only if it is probable that sentence of death will be passed upon the offender, at least the principal offender, and if the trial and the execution can be completed in a very short time. Otherwise the offenders, at least the principal offenders, are to be taken to Germany.

III. Prisoners taken to Germany are subject to military procedure only if particular military interests require this. In case German or foreign authorities inquire about such prisoners, they are to be told that they have been arrested but that the proceedings do not allow any further information.

IV. The Commanders in the occupied territories and the Court authorities within the framework of their jurisdiction, are personally responsible for the observance of this decree.

V. The Chief of the High Command of the Armed Forces determines in which occupied territories this decree is to be applied. He is authorized to explain and to issue executive orders and supplements. The Reich Minister of Justice will issue executive orders within his own jurisdiction.

== Rationale ==
The reasons for Nacht und Nebel were many. The policy, enforced in Nazi-occupied countries, meant that whenever someone was arrested, the family would learn nothing about the person's fate. The people arrested, sometimes only suspected resisters, were secretly sent to Germany and perhaps to a concentration camp. Whether they lived or died, the Germans would give out no information to the families involved. This was done to keep the population in occupied countries quiet by promoting an atmosphere of mystery, fear and terror.

The program made it far more difficult for other governments or humanitarian organisations to accuse the German government of specific misconduct because it obscured whether or not internment or death had even occurred, let alone the cause of the person's disappearance. It thereby kept the Nazis from being held accountable. It allowed across-the-board, silent defiance of international treaties and conventions – one cannot apply the requirements for humane treatment in war if one cannot locate a victim or discern that victim's fate. Additionally, the policy lessened German subjects' moral qualms about the Nazi regime, as well as their desire to speak out against it, by keeping the general public ignorant of the regime's malfeasance and by creating extreme pressure for service members to remain silent.

== Treatment of prisoners ==
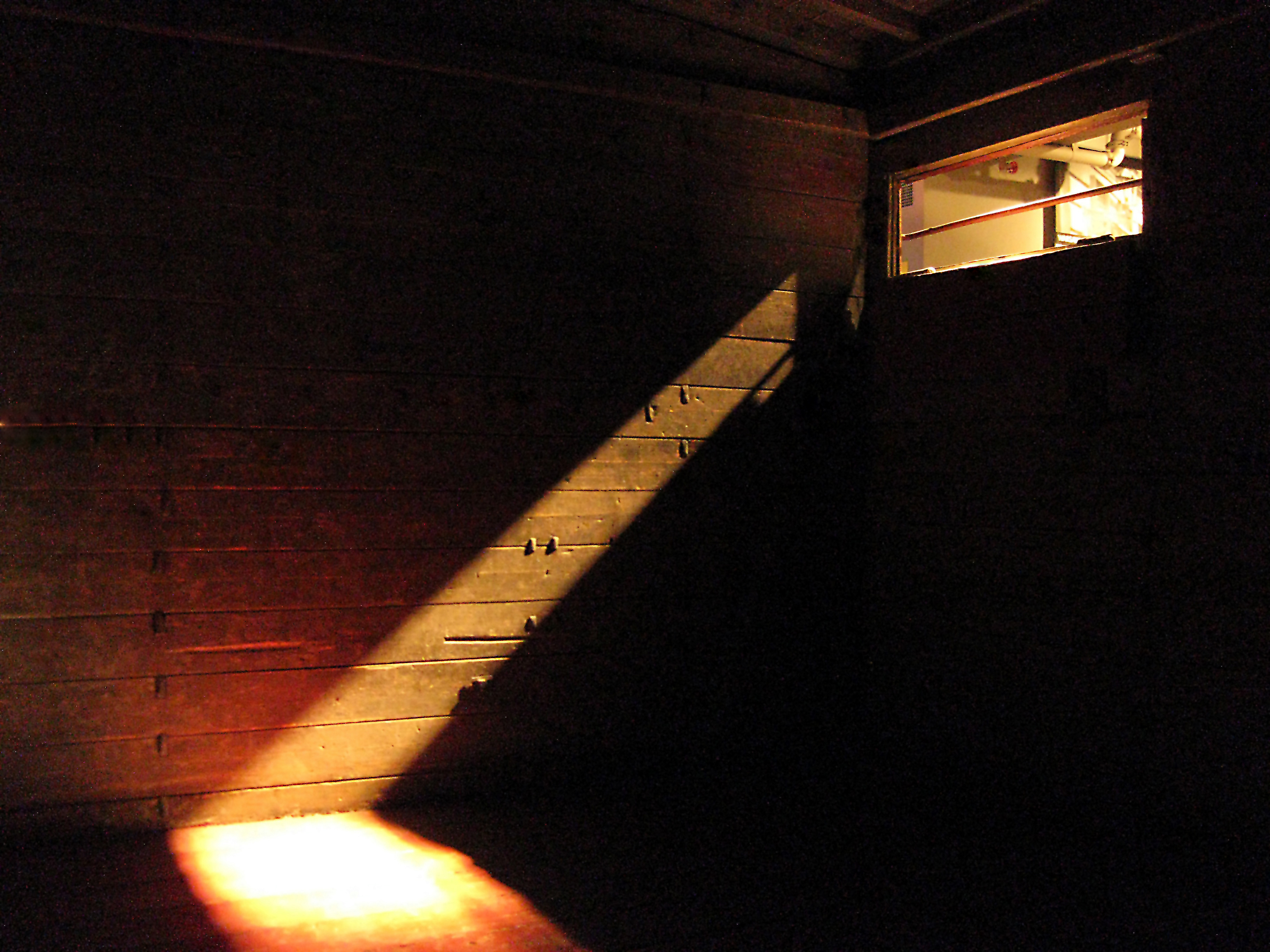
Replica of a Holocaust train covered goods wagon used by Nazi Germany to transport Jews and other victims during the Holocaust

The Nacht und Nebel prisoners' hair was shaved, and the women were given a convict costume of a thin cotton dress, wooden sandals, and a triangular black headcloth. According to historian Wolfgang Sofsky:

Prisoners of the Nacht und Nebel transports were marked by broad red bands; on their backs and both trouser legs was a cross, with the letters "NN" to its right. From these emblems, it was possible to recognize immediately what class a prisoner belonged to and how he or she was pigeonholed and evaluated by the SS.

The prisoners were often moved apparently at random from prison to prison such as Fresnes Prison in Paris, Waldheim near Dresden, Leipzig, Potsdam, Lübeck, and Stettin. The deportees were sometimes herded 80 at a time with standing room only into slow-moving, dirty cattle wagons with little or no food or water on journeys lasting up to five days to their next unknown destination.

At the camps, the prisoners were forced to stand for hours in freezing and wet conditions at 5:00 a.m. every morning, standing strictly to attention, before being sent to work a twelve-hour day with only a twenty-minute break for a scant meal. They were confined in cold and starving conditions; many had dysentery or other illnesses, and the weakest were often beaten to death, shot, guillotined, or hanged, while the others were subjected to torture by the Germans.

When the inmates were totally exhausted or if they were too ill or too weak to work, they were then transferred to the Revier (Krankenrevier, sick barrack) or other places for extermination. If a camp did not have a gas chamber of its own, the so-called Muselmänner, or prisoners who were too sick to work, were often murdered or transferred to other concentration camps for extermination.

When the Allies liberated Paris and Brussels, the SS transported many of its remaining Nacht und Nebel prisoners to concentration camps deeper in Nazi-controlled territory, such as Ravensbrück concentration camp for women, Mauthausen-Gusen concentration camp, Buchenwald concentration camp, Schloss Hartheim, or Flossenbürg concentration camp.

== Results ==
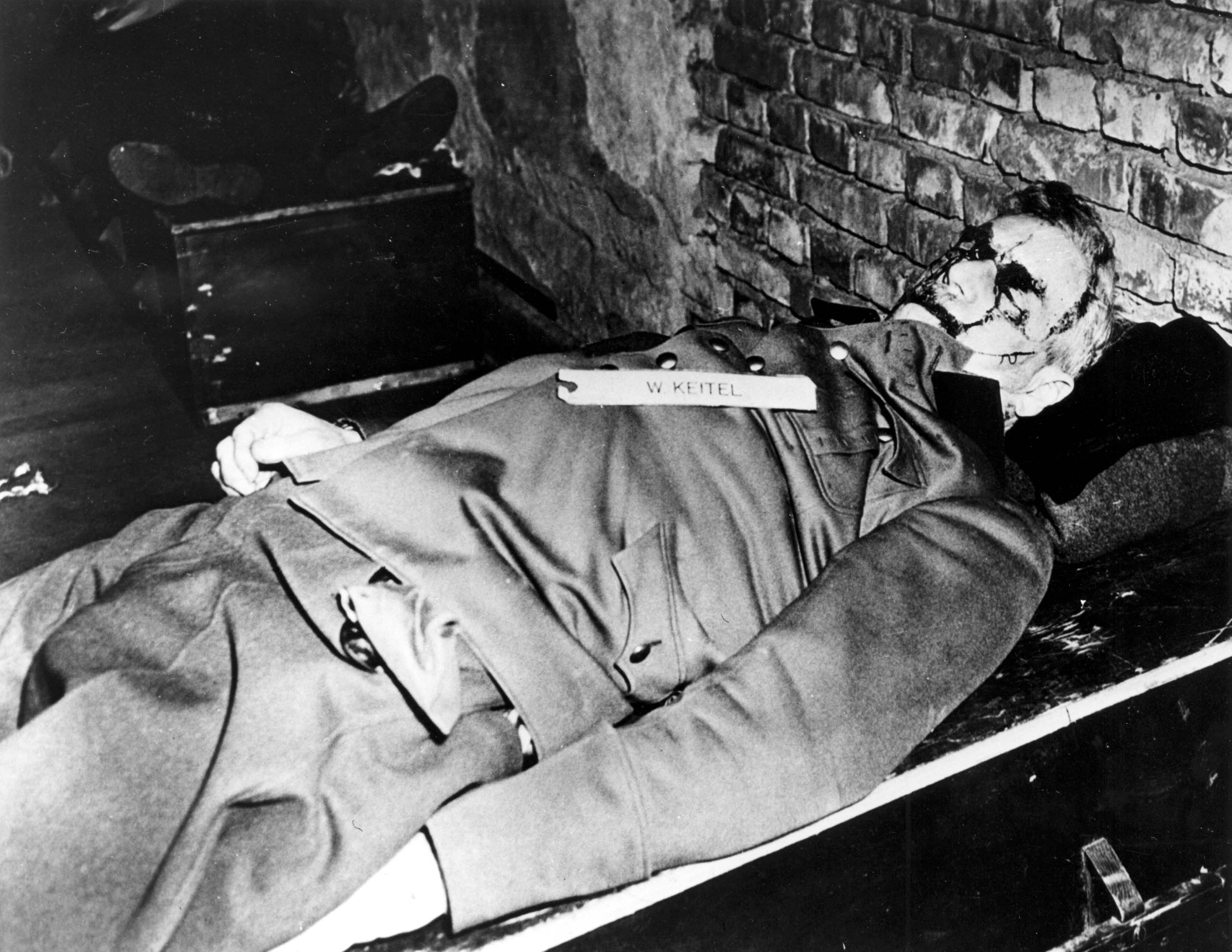
The body of Wilhelm Keitel after his execution, 1946

Early in the war, the program caused the mass execution of political prisoners, especially Soviet POWs, who in early 1942, outnumbered the Jews in number of deaths even at Auschwitz. As the transports grew and Hitler's troops moved across Europe, that ratio changed dramatically. The Nacht und Nebel decree was carried out surreptitiously, but it set the background for orders that would follow and established a "new dimension of fear". As the war continued, so did the openness of such decrees and orders.

Despite the best attempts of Joseph Goebbels and the Propaganda Ministry (with its formidable domestic information control) to hide the program, people's diaries and periodicals of the time show that it became progressively known to the German public. Soldiers brought back information, families on rare occasion heard from or about loved ones and Allied news sources and the BBC were able to get past censorship sporadically. Although captured archives from the SD contain numerous orders stamped with "NN" (Nacht und Nebel), it has never been determined exactly how many people disappeared as a result of the decree.

Doubts among the Allies about the atrocities being committed by the Nazis were pushed aside when the French entered the Natzweiler-Struthof camp (one of the Nacht und Nebel facilities) on 23 November 1944, and discovered a chamber where victims were hung by their wrists from hooks to accommodate the process of pumping poisonous Zyklon-B gas into the room. Keitel later testified at the Nuremberg Trials that of all the illegal orders he had carried out, the Nacht und Nebel decree was "the worst of all".

Former United States Supreme Court Justice and chief prosecutor at the international Nuremberg trial, Robert H. Jackson listed the "terrifying" Nacht und Nebel decree with the other crimes committed by the Nazis in his closing address. In part because of his role in carrying out this decree, Keitel was sentenced to death by hanging, despite his insistence on being shot instead due to his military service and rank. At 1:20 a.m. on 16 October 1946 Keitel defiantly shouted out, "Alles für Deutschland! Deutschland über alles!" just before the trapdoor opened beneath his feet.

It is considered an early example of enforced disappearance.

== Notable prisoners ==
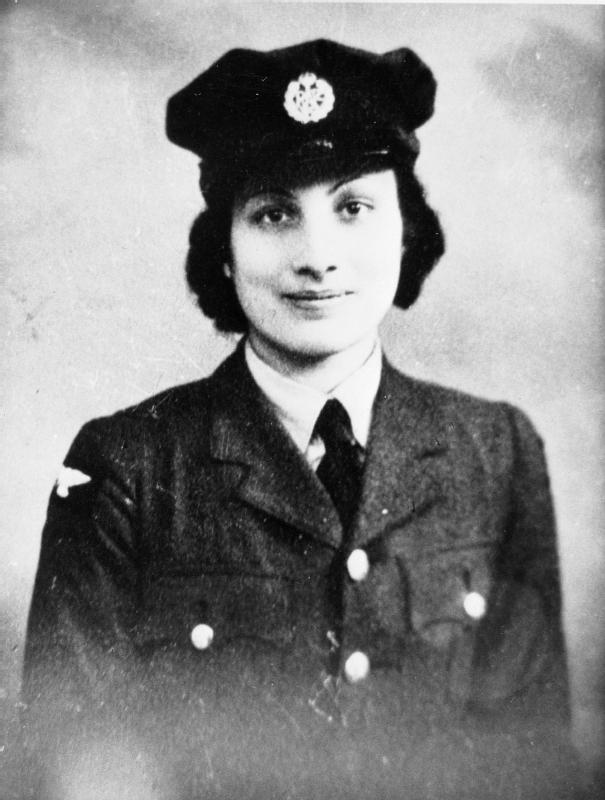
Noor Inayat Khan, a British agent who was executed under the Nacht und Nebel program

- Trygve Bratteli (Norwegian Resistance, later Prime Minister)
- Virginia d'Albert-Lake (American)
- Charles Delestraint (French Resistance)
- Andrée de Jongh ("Dédée") (Belgian Resistance)
- Noor Inayat Khan
- Mary Lindell (Comtesse de Milleville)
- Henriette Bie Lorentzen
- Elsie Maréchal (Belgian Resistance)
- Abelone Møgster (Norwegian Resistance)
- Henriette Roosenburg

== See also ==
- Black jails (China)
- Black site
- Commando Order
- Commissar Order
- Definition of terrorism
- Enforced disappearance
- Extraordinary rendition (US)
- Ghost detainee (War on Terror)
- National Defense Authorization Act for Fiscal Year 2012
- Le prisonnier politique – a 1949 sculpture
- List of Nazi concentration camps
- Resistance during World War II
  - Belgian Resistance
  - Dutch Resistance
  - French Resistance
  - Norwegian resistance movement
- Timeline of SOE's Prosper Network
- The Walls Came Tumbling Down (1957 book)
- Without the right of correspondence (USSR)

== Bibliography ==
- Barnett, Correlli, ed., (2003). Hitler's Generals. New York: Grove Press.
- Bracher, Karl-Dietrich (1970). The German Dictatorship: The Origins, Structure, and Effects of National Socialism. New York: Praeger Publishers. ASIN B001JZ4T16.
- Browning, Christoper, and Jürgen Matthäus (2004). The Origins of the Final Solution: The Evolution of Nazi Jewish Policy, September 1939–March 1942. Lincoln: University of Nebraska Press.
- Conot, Robert E. (2000) [1983]. Justice at Nuremberg. New York: Carroll & Graf Publishers.
- Crankshaw, Edward (1990). Gestapo: Instrument of Tyranny. London: Greenhill Books.
- Dülffer, Jost (2009). Nazi Germany 1933–1945: Faith and Annihilation. London: Bloomsbury.
- Gellately, Robert (2001). Backing Hitler: Consent and Coercion in Nazi Germany. New York: Oxford University Press.
- Huhle, Rainer. "Nacht und Nebel – Mythos und Bedeutung." Zeitschrift für Menschenrechte 8, no. 1 (2014): 120–135. ISBN 978-3-73440-024-7
- Johnson, Eric (2006). What We Knew: Terror, Mass Murder, and Everyday Life in Nazi Germany. New York: Basic Books.
- Kaden, Helma, and Ludwig Nestler, eds., (1993). Dokumente des Verbrechens: Aus den Akten des Dritten Reiches. 3 Bände. Vol i. Berlin: Dietz Verlag.
- Kammer, Hilde and Elisabet Bartsch (1999). Lexikon Nationalsozialismus: Begriffe, Organisationen und Institutionen (Rororo-Sachbuch). Hamburg: Rowohlt Taschenbuch.
- Kogon, Eugen (2006) [1950]. The Theory and Practice of Hell: The German Concentration Camps and the System behind Them. New York: Farrar, Straus and Giroux. ISBN 978-0-37452-992-5
- Lowe Keith (2012). Savage Continent: Europe in the Aftermath of World War II. New York: Picador.
- Manchester, William (2003). The Arms of Krupp, 1587–1968: The Rise and Fall of the Industrial Dynasty that Armed Germany at War. New York & Boston: Back Bay Books.
- Mayer, Arno (2012) [1988]. Why Did the Heavens Not Darken?: The "Final Solution" in History. London & New York: Verso Publishing.
- Overy, Richard (2006). The Dictators: Hitler's Germany, Stalin's Russia. New York: W. W. Norton & Company. ISBN 978-0-39332-797-7
- Shirer, William L. (1990). The Rise and Fall of the Third Reich. New York: MJF Books. Originally published in [1959]. Drawing upon Nazi Conspiracy and Aggression, part of the Nuremberg Documents, Vol. VII, pages 871-874, Nuremberg Document L-90.
- Sofsky, Wolfgang (1997). The Order of Terror: The Concentration Camp. Translated by William Templer. Princeton, NJ: Princeton University Press.
- Spielvogel, Jackson (1992). Hitler and Nazi Germany: A History. New York: Prentice Hall.
- Stackelberg, Roderick (2007). The Routledge Companion to Nazi Germany. New York: Routledge.
- Taylor, James, and Warren Shaw (2002) Dictionary of the Third Reich. New York: Penguin.
- Toland, John (1976). Adolf Hitler. New York: Doubleday.
- Weale, Adrian (2012). Army of Evil: A History of the SS. New York: Caliber Printing. ISBN 978-0-451-23791-0.
- United States Holocaust Memorial Museum. (2014). Holocaust Encyclopedia, "Night and Fog Decree"

Further reading

- Harthoorn, Willem Lodewijk. Verboden te sterven, Van Gruting, 2007, ISBN 978-90-75879-37-7 – A personal account of a person who survived as a "Night and Fog" prisoner four months in Gross-Rosen and a year in Natzweiler
