= Operation Sunshine =

Anti-demolition operation in occupied Norway from 1944 to 1945

Operation Sunshine was an anti-demolition operation in occupied Norway from October 1944 to May 1945. It was planned by Norwegian military personnel in the United Kingdom in cooperation with British forces, and part of an effort to protect essential installations and industry, in particular large power stations, against destruction in a possible scorched earth action by the Germans towards the end of World War II.

== Planning ==
Operation Sunshine was planned by Leif Tronstad from his position within the exiled Norwegian Ministry of Defence in London. An important goal was to protect the power plant industry in Norway,f and the targeted operation area was chosen such that it comprised sixty percent of the energy supplies in Eastern Norway. This included power stations in the Rjukan district, Notodden, Kongsberg and Nore.

Nine SOE agents, among them several from the heavy water sabotage team, were selected for the mission and para-dropped over Ugleflott in Øvre Telemark 5 October 1944. The overall leader of Operation Sunshine was Major Leif Tronstad, with assistance from Gunnar Syverstad and Norman Lind. Einar Skinnarland, who already was in Norway, received the agents, and also joined as wireline operator. Second-in command of Operation Sunshine was Jens-Anton Poulsson, also leader of the Moonlight section. When Tronstad was killed in March 1945, Poulsson took over as leader of Sunshine.

The operation covered parts of Telemark and Buskerud counties, and overlapped existing Milorg districts. The district covered by Sunshine was separated out as Milorg district 16 (D-16), and was divided in three subsections, with the codenames Starlight, Moonlight and Lamplight. The SOE agents would cooperate with and develop existing Milorg groups already established in the districts. The groups would be supplied with weapon and provisions by air drops from allied aircraft, and provided with military instruction.

== Sunshine subsections ==
=== Starlight (D161, Nore section) ===
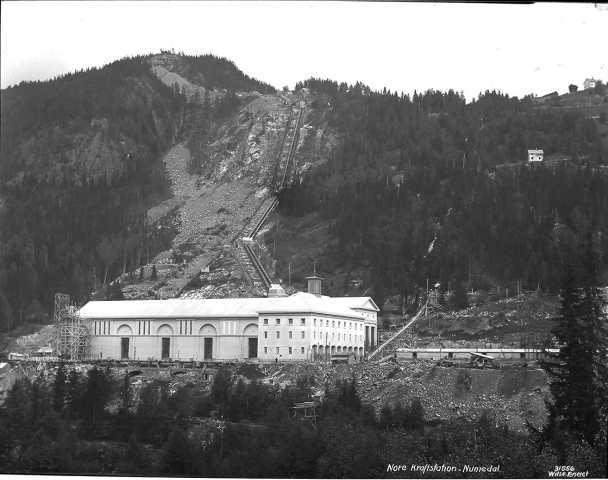
Nore Power Station

The Nore section was led by Arne Kjelstrup, with Eldar Hagen as wireline operator. Their main defending target was the Nore Hydroelectric Power Station, which was then the largest power station in Norway. The section also included Numedal, Kongsberg, Rollag and Rødberg. This was the original Milorg district D16, under command of district leader Oscar Beck, and Milorg organized around 450 men in this district in October 1944. In the end this section could mobilize a military force of 900 soldiers. The troops received air drops with weapons, ammunition, uniforms and food supplies. Some of the men had left their homes and stayed in mountain cabins, organized in small cells, each of around ten men. Starlight had five such cells. Others still lived and worked as normal, having attended short military courses, and belonging to a group local to their home place. Starlight had around ten such group, where the number of group members varied from 30 to 150.

=== Moonlight (D162, Rjukan section) ===
The Rjukan section was led by Jens-Anton Poulsson, with Claus Helberg as wireless operator. In the surrounding mountains a military force consisting of 300 soldiers was built up. Main defending targets were the dam at Møsvatn, factories and power stations at Rjukan and Vemork, and the ferries on Lake Tinn.

=== Lamplight (D163, Notodden section) ===
The Notodden section was led by Herluf Nygaard, and with Leif Brønn as wireline operator. About 500 men were organised in this section at the end of December 1944. Important defending targets were Svelgfoss Power Station and other power stations along the river Tinnelva.
