= Knut Haugland =

Norwegian resistance fighter and explorer (1917–2009)

- Born: 23 September 1917; Rjukan, Norway
- Died: 25 December 2009 (aged 92)
- Occupation: Museum director
- Known for: Crew member on the Kon-Tiki; Resistance fighter during World War II

Knut Magne Haugland, DSO, MM, (23 September 1917 – 25 December 2009) was a resistance fighter and noted explorer from Norway, who accompanied Thor Heyerdahl on his famous 1947 Kon-Tiki expedition.

== Early life and World War II ==
Haugland, born in 1917 in Rjukan, Telemark, Norway, took his examen artium in 1937 qualifying him for university study. In 1938 he enrolled in military radio studies and afterward joined the Norwegian Army. In February 1940 he was stationed in Setermoen, and soon fought in battles near Narvik as a part of the Norwegian Campaign against Germany. After Germany's defeat of the Norwegian forces and the Nazi occupation, Haugland went to work at the factory Høvding Radiofabrikk in Oslo while also secretly involved in the Norwegian resistance movement. After evading arrest several times, in August 1941 he was arrested by Statspolitiet, but escaped and fled to the United Kingdom via Sweden. There he enrolled in the Norwegian Independent Company 1 (Kompani Linge).

=== Heavy water sabotage ===
Haugland, with nine other Norwegian resisters organised and carried out the famous raid on the Norsk Hydro Rjukan plant at Vemork. The plant was known to be producing heavy water, and although the scientist and organiser of the sabotage, Leif Tronstad, had not been aware of the connection between heavy water and atomic weaponry early in the war, it eventually became clear that Germany could be using the heavy water for a nuclear energy project. Haugland was parachuted over Hardangervidda on 18 October 1942 together with Arne Kjelstrup, Jens-Anton Poulsson and Claus Helberg. Their codename was Operation Grouse, and their first mission was to await the British Operation Freshman. Freshman became a disastrous failure, but Grouse was ordered to wait for another team: Operation Gunnerside. The plant at Vemork was successfully sabotaged in February 1943. This was dramatised in the 1963 Anthony Mann-directed film The Heroes of Telemark, which Haugland did not approve of. In 2003 he made a BBC documentary with Ray Mears, The Real Heroes of Telemark.

=== Rest of the war ===
Haugland and others, stayed in Hardangervidda for two months with Einar Skinnarland, whom he trained. Haugland then went to Oslo to train marine telegraphers. After a trip to the United Kingdom for radio supplies, he returned to Norway in November, being parachuted at Skrimfjella together with Gunnar Sønsteby. Haugland was arrested for a second time, by Gestapo in Kongsberg, but again escaped and commenced his training duties. On 1 April 1944 he narrowly escaped another capture by the Gestapo when one of his transmitters, hidden in the Oslo Maternity Hospital, was located by radio direction finding. Haugland fled to the United Kingdom again, and did not return.

He was awarded Norway's highest decoration for military gallantry, the War Cross with sword. He was awarded this decoration twice, in 1943 and 1944: the War Cross with two swords. In addition, Haugland was awarded the Distinguished Service Order and the Military Medal by the British. He also received the French Croix de Guerre avec Palme and Légion d'honneur and the Royal Norwegian Order of St. Olav.

He was also awarded the Medal with rosette and Haakon VII's 70-Medal. The United States decorated him with the Medal of Freedom with bronze palm.

== Post-war life ==
After the war, Haugland continued his military career for many years, except for 1947 when he took part in the Kon-Tiki expedition (see below). In 1951 he married librarian Ingeborg Prestholdt. He participated in the Independent Norwegian Brigade Group in Germany from 1948 to 1949, continued in the Forsvarsstaben until 1952, when he was transferred to the Royal Norwegian Air Force. He headed the electronic intelligence service in Northern Norway, an important position during the Cold War. He held the ranks of major from 1954 and lieutenant colonel from 1977.

He left the Air Force in 1963 to become acting, later permanent, director of the Norway's Resistance Museum. He retired from this position in 1983. He was also the director of the Kon-Tiki Museum from its start in 1947 to 1990. He rounded off his career as board chairman of the Kon-Tiki Museum in 1991. Haugland also served as J. S. Wilson's attaché at the 1949 12th World Scout Conference in Elvesæter. Five of the six men in the Kon-Tiki expedition were Scouts.

=== Kon-Tiki expedition ===
Haugland first met Thor Heyerdahl in 1944 at a paramilitary training camp in England. It was here that Haugland first heard of Heyerdahl's theories about Polynesian migration patterns, and his plans to cross the Pacific on a balsa wood raft. In 1947 Haugland was invited by Heyerdahl to join the Kon-Tiki expedition as a radio operator. On the expedition Haugland and Torstein Raaby (another former resistance member) were in frequent radio contact with American amateur operators, sending meteorological and hydrographic data to be passed on to the Meteorological Institute in Washington, DC. Despite the tiny radio which had an output of only 6 watts, about the same as a small battery-powered torch, they managed to contact radio operators in Norway, even sending a telegram to congratulate King Haakon VII on his 75th birthday. Haugland played himself in the 1950 documentary film Kon-Tiki. Haugland died on 25 December 2009, and was the last living crew member who served on the Kon-Tiki expedition.

Several foreign decorations resulted from Haugland's connection with the Kon-Tiki and a state visit in the postwar period. He was made a Knight of the 1st class of the Order of Vasa, Knight 1st Class of the Order of Dannebrog and Knight of the Icelandic Order of the Falcon. He was awarded the first class cross of the Federal Republic of Germany's Order of Merit, was appointed a Commander of the Belgian Order of Leopold and Companion of the Order of the Crown of Thailand. He was an officer of the Iranian Order of the Lion and the Sun, received the Grand Decoration of Honour in Gold for Services to the Republic of Austria (1978) and the Peruvian Order of Merit for Distinguished Service.

In 1988, Haugland was made Knight 1st Class of the Order of St. Olav for his efforts as a museum manager. He also received the Defence Medal with three stars.

Cultural offices
Preceded by position created	Director of Norway's Resistance Museum; 1963–1983	Succeeded by Reidar Torp
