= Norman Lind =

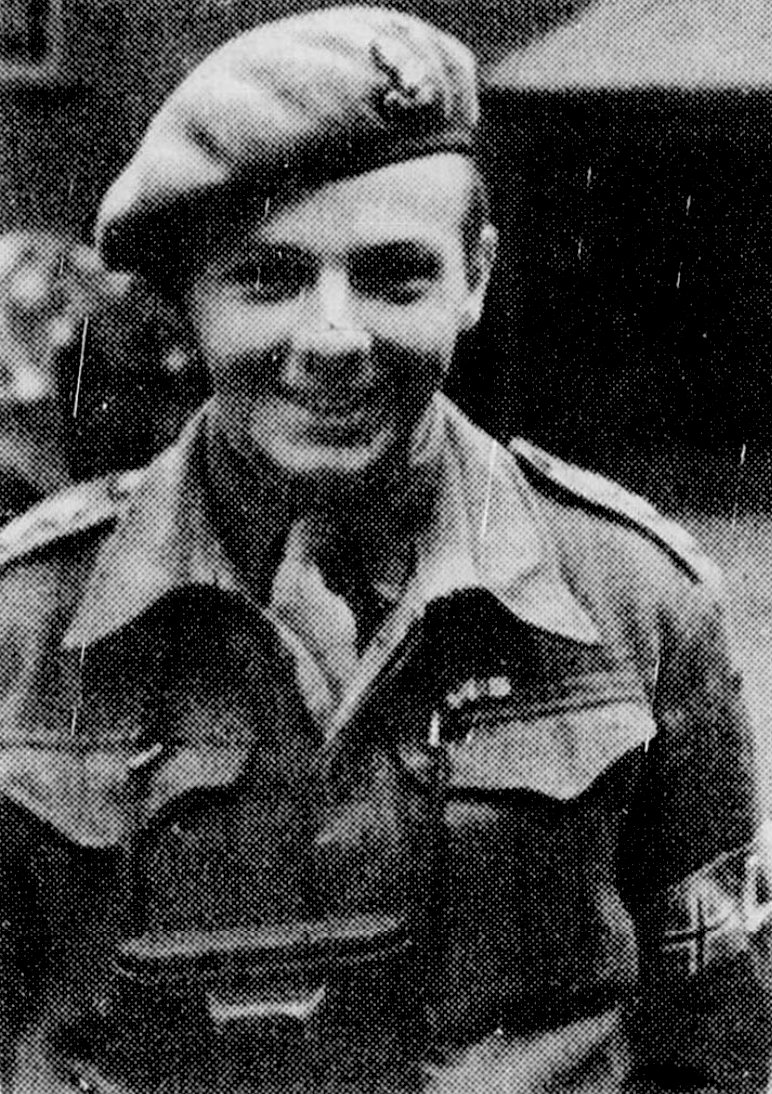

Norman Lind (1920/1921 – 23 October 1985) was a British-Norwegian military officer and consul.

He was born in Bergen as a son of Norwegian coffee planter with connections in England and Guatemala. He took his higher education in the United Kingdom. During World War II he served in the Royal Engineers in 1940 before attending officer's school for two years. After serving one year in the Tunisian campaign, he joined the Special Forces and eventually the Norwegian Independent Company 1 (Norwegian: Kompani Linge). He is known for participating in Operation Sunshine, having been paradropped over Hardangervidda on 4 November 1944. Reportedly, he was the first British officer who landed in Norway after the conclusion of the British involvement in the Norwegian campaign. Lind was a member of the central staff of Operation Sunshine, along with leader Leif Tronstad and Gunnar Syverstad. Sunshine came to be identical with the Milorg District 16 (D-16). The headquarters was established at a small mountain cabin in Skriubotn on the Hardangervidda, west for Møsvatn. This cabin had been built by Einar Skinnarland, who also joined the staff as wireline operator for radio communication with England. Lind also served as a weapons instructor for Milorg's District 16.

He was decorated with the St. Olav's Medal With Oak Branch in 1948. Lind had moved to Guatemala in 1946, and in 1948 he married Norwegian citizen Berit Elise Sverdrup. In Guatemala he owned a plantation, and worked with trade. He served as vice consul from 1953, consul from 1962 and consul-general from 1975. He was killed in October 1985 when his aircraft hit a landmine when landing.
