= Jens-Anton Poulsson =

Norwegian military officer (1918–2010)

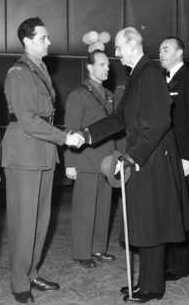
- Jens-Anton Poulsson shaking hands with King Haakon VII at the release of the 1948 film Operation Swallow: The Battle for Heavy Water
- Born: 27 October 1918; Tinn Municipality, Norway
- Died: 2 February 2010 (aged 91)
- Relatives: Else Poulsson (sister)
- Military career
- Allegiance: Norway
- Branch: Norwegian Army
- Service years: 1940–1982
- Rank: Colonel
- Unit: Norwegian Independent Company 1
- Commands: Danish–Norwegian battalion of UNEF; His Majesty The King's Guard; 3rd Infantry Regiment
- Conflicts: Norwegian Campaign
- Awards: (Norway) War Cross with sword (Norway) Defence Medal with rosette (Norway) Haakon VIIs 70th Anniversary Medal (United Kingdom) Distinguished Service Order

Jens-Anton Poulsson DSO (27 October 1918 – 2 February 2010) was a Norwegian military officer. During World War II he was a Norwegian resistance member, especially noted for his role in the heavy water sabotage 1942–1943. He continued his military career after the war, and was appointed colonel in 1968.

== Personal life ==
Poulsson was born in Rjukan on 27 October 1918. His parents were Jens Jørgensen Poulsson and Vivi Lange, and his older sister was artist Else Poulsson. In 1946 he married Bergljot Josefine Dammen.

== World War II ==
=== Heavy water sabotage ===
Poulsson served as a second lieutenant in the Norwegian Independent Company 1 (Norwegian: Kompani Linge) during World War II. As a leader of the Grouse team he parachuted onto the Hardangervidda plateau on 18 October 1942, along with Arne Kjelstrup, Knut Haugland and Claus Helberg. The team landed at Fjarefit in Songadalen, and prepared to receive British troops of Operation Freshman at Møsvassdammen. The Freshman operation was a failure, as the two gliders crashed. Another operation, called Gunnerside, was successful. The Gunnerside team joined the Grouse (later renamed Swallow), and the combined team succeeded in the destruction of heavy water equipment and stock at Vemork in February 1943. After the sabotage Poulsson escaped to Oslo, and later via Sweden to the United Kingdom.

Poulsson was awarded Norway's War Cross with sword, after his return to United Kingdom in 1943. It was presented to him by King Haakon at a ceremony at the training school STS 26 in Scotland, near Nethy Bridge. Also Rønneberg, leader of the Gunnerside team, received the War Cross with sword at this ceremony, while the other participants in the heavy water sabotage received the St. Olav's Medal With Oak Branch.

=== Operation Sunshine ===
Poulsson returned to Norway in 1944, participating in Operation Sunshine led by major Leif Tronstad. Nine SOE agents, among them several from the heavy water sabotage team, were paradropped over Ugleflott in Øvre Telemark 5 October 1944. Their mission was to establish fighting groups at Rjukan, Notodden and Nore. Poulsson, along with Claus Helberg as wireless operator, was responsible for the Rjukan section. In the mountains surrounding Rjukan a military force consisting of 300 soldiers was built up, and the troops were supplied with provisions and weapons from allied aircraft.

The part of Telemark which was covered by Sunshine was called Milorg district 16 (D-16). When Tronstad was killed in a shooting episode 11 March 1945, Poulsson took over as leader of the Sunshine operation (Milorg D-16).

=== Awards ===
For his war contributions Poulsson was decorated with the Defence Medal with rosette and Haakon VIIs 70th Anniversary Medal, in addition to the War Cross. He was also decorated with the British Distinguished Service Order (DSO) as well as the St. Olav's Medal With Oak Branch.

== Post war ==
In 1960 Poulsson was leading the Danish–Norwegian battalion (Danor) in the UN force UNEF in Gaza. From 1961 he held various leading positions in the Norwegian Army, and has been a colonel since 1968. He headed His Majesty The King's Guard from 1961–1965, he was second in command for Brigade Nord from 1967–1968 and he headed the 3rd Infantry Regiment from 1980–1982.

Poulsson died early February 2010 aged 91.

In his funeral, King Harald V participated, in addition to historian Knut Werner Hagen, who is about to write a book about Poulsson in the near future.
