= Arne Kjelstrup =

Norwegian resistance member (1913–1995)

- Born: 13 October 1913; Rjukan, Norway
- Died: 5 May 1995 (aged 81)
- Military career
- Allegiance: Norway
- Branch: Norwegian Army
- Service years: 1940–1945
- Rank: Sergeant
- Unit: Norwegian Independent Company 1
- Conflicts: Norwegian Campaign
- Other work: Plumber

Arne Kjelstrup, MM (30 October 1913 – 5 May 1995) was a Norwegian resistance member during World War II, especially noted for his role in the heavy water sabotage 1942–1943, and for being military leader of Milorg section D-161 (Kongsberg/Numedal) during the anti-demolition operation Sunshine 1944–1945.

== Personal life ==
Kjelstrup was born in Rjukan. He later moved with his parents to Bærum, where he worked as a plumber at the outbreak of World War II. After the war Kjesltrup married Tulla Irgens, who had participated in the Operation Starlight, the Kongsberg-Numedal-Nore subsection of Operation Sunshine. Kjelstrup took further education in Stockholm, and settled in Bærum, working in the plumbing business.

== World War II ==
Following the German invasion of Norway in April 1940 Kjelstrup participated in the defence of Norway as a soldier. He was hit by a German bullet, but saved his life because he was carrying a pair of wire cutters that the bullet hit before entering his body. The bullet stayed in his body for the duration of his life. When the battles were over he travelled to Sweden, and after a long journey, via Moscow, Odessa, Istanbul, Suez, Durban, Cape Town, Trinidad, Halifax and Liverpool he ended up in London, where he became a member of the Norwegian Independent Company 1 (Norwegian: Kompani Linge). He was recruited a member of the Grouse team which was parachuted onto the Hardangervidda plateau on 18 October 1942, along with Jens-Anton Poulsson (leader of the group), Knut Haugland and Claus Helberg. The team landed at Fjarefit in Songadalen, and relocated to Møsvatn where they prepared to receive British troops, the Operation Freshman. The Freshman operation was a failure, as the two gliders plus one of the towing planes crashed. The Grouse team spent several winter months hidden at Hardangervidda, waiting for the replacement operation, Gunnerside. The combined Grouse and Gunnerside team finally succeeded in the destruction of heavy water equipment and stock at Vemork in February 1943

After the sabotage Kjelstrup stayed in Norway together with Knut Haukelid, and participated in building up Milorg troops in the Western Telemark district (the Bonzo group). He later returned to the United Kingdom via Sweden. As a sergeant in the Linge company he joined various military courses, receiving training in explosives and sabotage. In 1944 he participated in Operation Sunshine led by major Leif Tronstad. This was an anti-demolition operation to prevent destruction by the Germans of vital industry in Norway towards the end of the war. Kjelstrup was a leader of the Nore section (Operation Starlight), which could mobilize a military force of 900 soldiers at the end of the war.

He lived his later life in Bærum, and died on 5 May 1995, just days before the 50-year anniversary of the liberation of Norway.

== Honors ==
- Norway - St. Olav's Medal With Oak Branch (1943)
- Norway - Defence Medal 1940–1945
- Norway - Haakon VIIs 70th Anniversary Medal
- United Kingdom - 1939–1945 Star
- United Kingdom - Military Medal
- France - Legion of Honor
- France - Croix de Guerre

== Biography ==
- Berg, John (1986). Soldaten som ikke ville gi seg. Metope. ISBN 82-403-0002-2. The biography covers only 1940-1945
