= Operation Swallow: The Battle for Heavy Water =

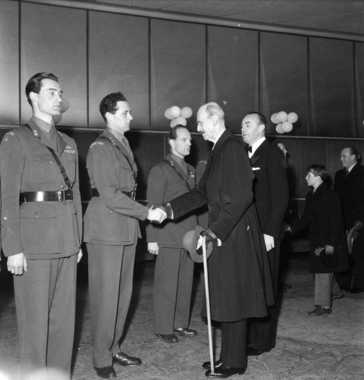
- From left, Joachim Rønneberg, Jens-Anton Poulsson and Kasper Idland receive King Haakon VII of Norway at the premiere of Operation Swallow: The Battle for Heavy Water (1948)
- Kampen om tungtvannet
- Directed by: Jean Dréville; Titus Vibe-Müller
- Written by: Arild Feldborg, Jean Marin, Dinah Robertson, etc.
- Starring: Jens-Anton Poulsson; Johannes Eckhoff; Arne Kjelstrup; Claus Helberg; Henki Kolstad; Claus Wiese; Knut Haukelid; Fredrik Kayser; Andreas Aabel
- Cinematography: Hilding Bladh; Marcel Weiss
- Edited by: Jean Feyte
- Music by: Gunnar Sønstevold
- Distributed by: Hero Film; Trident
- Release date: 5 February 1948
- Running time: 98 minutes
- Countries: Norway; France
- Language: Norwegian
- Box office: 5,373,377 admissions (France)

Operation Swallow: The Battle for Heavy Water (original title: Kampen om tungtvannet, French title: La Bataille de l'eau lourde) is a Norwegian-French film from 1948. The story is based on the best known commando raid in Norway during World War II, where the resistance group Norwegian Independent Company 1 destroyed the heavy water plant at Vemork in Telemark in February 1943.

The film is basically a reconstruction of real events, a docudrama, with many of the participants playing themselves in the film. It was filmed on location in Norway.

== Cast ==
- Andreas Aabel as Kasper Idland
- Jens-Anton Poulsson as himself
- Johannes Eckhoff
- Arne Kjelstrup as himself
- Claus Helberg as himself
- Claus Wiese as Joachim Rønneberg
- Henki Kolstad as Einar Skinnarland
- Knut Haukelid as himself
- Fredrik Kayser as himself
- Hans Storhaug as himself
- Torstein Skinnarland as himself, the dam keeper
- Rolf Sørlie as himself
- Knut Lier-Hansen as himself
- David Knudsen
- Harald Schwenzen
- Raoul Dautry
- Frédéric Joliot-Curie
- Lew Kowarski
- Sigrid Gurie
- Øyvind Øyen as the professor, Major Leif Tronstad

== Reception ==
It was the second most popular film at the French box office in 1948.

== See also ==
- The Heroes of Telemark, a 1965 film
- The Heavy Water War, a 2015 TV series
