= Knut Lier-Hansen =

Norwegian resistance member (1916–2008)

Knut Lier-Hansen (8 September 1916 – 28 March 2008) was a Norwegian resistance member during World War II.

He was born and grew up in Rjukan. Around 1940 he was a sergeant in the Norwegian Army, and tried to repel the German invaders in April 1940, among others in a skirmish at Gransherad. He later joined the more irregular resistance movement. His most notable mission was the sinking of SF Hydro as a part of the Norwegian heavy water sabotage. After placing explosives below deck in the ferry, the saboteurs had to wait until the ferry's departure in the morning to oversee that nothing went against the plan. After witnessing the ferry leave harbor in a normal way, Lier-Hansen fled the scene for Einar Skinnarland's house. The ferry went down in the middle of Lake Tinn, and in addition to sabotaging the heavy water program, eighteen lives (fourteen civilians) were lost. When the war between Germany and Norway was over, on 8 May 1945, Lier-Hansen was dispatched together with Henry Johansen and another person to arrest Reichskommissar für die besetzten Norwegischen Gebiete Josef Terboven. The Norwegians reached Skaugum where Terboven had entrenched himself, but they were warded off by guards. Soon after, Terboven blew himself up.

After the war he participated in the film Kampen om tungtvannet. He also received death threats linked with successive anniversaries of the SF Hydro sinking. He was sparsely decorated.
