= The Heroes of Telemark =

1965 film by Anthony Mann

- Directed by: Anthony Mann
- Written by: Ben Barzman; Ivan Moffat
- Based on: Skis Against the Atom; 1954 memoir by Knut Haukelid; But for These Men; 1962 novel by John Drummond
- Produced by: Benjamin Fisz
- Starring: Kirk Douglas; Richard Harris; Ulla Jacobsson
- Cinematography: Robert Krasker
- Edited by: Bert Bates
- Music by: Malcolm Arnold
- Production company: Benton Film Productions
- Distributed by: The Rank Organisation
- Release dates: 23 November 1965 (London-Premiere); 26 November 1965 (UK)
- Running time: 130 minutes
- Country: United Kingdom
- Languages: English; German; Norwegian
- Budget: £2 million ($4.5 million)
- Box office: $1,650,000 (est. US/ Canada rentals)

The Heroes of Telemark is a 1965 British war film directed by Anthony Mann based on the true story of the Norwegian heavy water sabotage during the Second World War from Skis Against the Atom, the memoirs of Norwegian resistance soldier Knut Haukelid. The film stars Kirk Douglas as Dr. Rolf Pedersen and Richard Harris as Knut Straud, along with Ulla Jacobsson as Anna Pedersen.

== Plot ==
The Norwegian resistance sabotage the Vemork Norsk Hydro plant in the town of Rjukan in the county of Telemark, Norway, which the Nazis are using to produce heavy water, which could be used in the manufacture of an atomic bomb.

Rolf Pedersen, a Norwegian physics professor, who, though originally content to wait out the war, is soon pulled into the struggle by local resistance leader Knut Straud (based on Knut Haukelid). Rolf's ex-wife Anna also becomes involved in the effort, and her relationship with Rolf reignites.

Rolf and Knut sneak out of Norway on a passenger steamship to Britain that they hijack so they can deliver microfilmed plans of the hydroelectric plant to the British, who are impressed by the information. Then the two return to Norway by parachute to plan a commando raid against the plant. When a British plane carrying a force of Royal Engineers to undertake the raid is shot down over Norway by the Germans, Pedersen and Straud lead a small force of Norwegian saboteurs into the plant. The raid is successful, but the Germans quickly replace and repair the equipment.

A Quisling (traitor) saboteur worms his way into the resistance group, after they debate whether to shoot him or not. He ends up escaping and betraying them, so that a German plane blows up their safe house. When the Nazis and the saboteur pursue Rolf and Knut, Rolf and the saboteur end up alone, and Rolf kills him.

When Rolf and Knut learn of German plans to ship steel drums of heavy water to Germany, they sabotage the ferry carrying the drums, and it sinks in the deepest part of a fjord. Rolf himself ends up on the ferry when he sees a resistance comrade's widow and her young child getting aboard; Rolf improvises a "game" whereby all the children on board practise with lifejackets at the stern of the ship. Thus, when the ferry sinks, the children, and Rolf and the widow, are able to escape. Knut and Anna, in a small boat, come and help rescue passengers.

== Cast ==
- Kirk Douglas as Dr Rolf Pedersen
- Richard Harris as Knut Straud
- Ulla Jacobsson as Anna Pedersen
- Michael Redgrave as Uncle
- David Weston as Arne
- Sebastian Breaks as Gunnar
- John Golightly as Freddy
- Alan Howard as Oli
- Patrick Jordan as Henrik
- William Marlowe as Claus
- Brook Williams as Einar
- Roy Dotrice as Jensen
- Anton Diffring as Major Frick
- Ralph Michael as Nilssen
- Eric Porter as Josef Terboven
- Wolf Frees as Sturmbannführer Knippelberg
- Karel Stepanek as Professor Hartmüller
- Gerard Heinz as Professor Erhardt
- Victor Beaumont as German Sergeant
- George Murcell as SS Oberscharführer
- Mervyn Johns as Col. Wilkinson
- Barry Jones as Professor Roderick Logan
- Geoffrey Keen as Gen. Bolt
- Robert Ayres as General Courts
- Jennifer Hilary as Sigrid
- Maurice Denham as Doctor
- David Davies as Captain of Galtesund
- Philo Hauser as Businessman
- Faith Brook as Woman on Bus
- Elvi Hale as Mrs. Sandersen
- Russell Waters as Mr. Sandersen
- Paul Hansard as German Officer (uncredited)
- George Roubicek as Soldier Operating Radio Direction Finder (uncredited)
- Joe Dunne as Norwegian Quisling's Nazi (uncredited)

== Production ==
Knut Haukelid wrote a memoir of the attack called Skis Against the Atom published in 1954. John Drummond wrote a novel based on the same story called But for These Men. Both books formed the basis of the screenplay.

The film was originally announced in 1963. It was made by Benton Film Productions, a company of director Anthony Mann and producer S. Benjamin Fisz. Financing came from America's Allied Artists and Britain's J Arthur Rank Productions.

The movie was originally titled The Unknown Battle and was to have starred Stephen Boyd and Elke Sommer and be written by Ben Barzman. Later, Anthony Perkins was announced as a star, though he withdrew. Eventually Kirk Douglas signed as the lead. Cliff Robertson was mentioned as a possible co-star before Richard Harris came on board.

In February 1964 Rank announced it would make eight films at a cost of £4.5 million, including The Unknown Battle. Rank's stake in the film was reportedly £1 million.

"I hear they are spending five million dollars, so it's got to be spectacular and that means more fiction and less fact", said Haukelid during filming.

Stephen Boyd later sued Mann for $0.5 million when funding for the initial project fell apart in early 1964. "I missed out on four good roles and plenty of money when he signed me without financial backing and then dropped the project", said Boyd later. "He asked me again later but I'd made other commitments, so Kirk Douglas and Richard Harris made it under another title."

Besides the sequence in the fjord, the raids (Operations Grouse, Freshman and Gunnerside) and the final attack are filmed on location, with mountainous and snowy Norwegian locations serving as a backdrop. Scenes early in the film when the main characters escape from occupied Norway were filmed around Poole and Hamworthy in Dorset, with the former Channel Islands ship TSS Roebuck playing the role of the hijacked steamer. SF Ammonia was used to represent the train ferry SF Hydro in the final fjord scenes. Production concluded at Pinewood Studios.

== Historical accuracy ==
Unlike the scenes in the film, the saboteurs had already left the area when the bomb exploded. Also omitted is the death of 18 Norwegian civilians in the sinking and the rescue efforts of local fishermen.

== Reception ==
It was amongst the 15 most popular films at the British box office in 1966. The film has a 67% rating in Rotten Tomatoes, based on six reviews, with an average rating of 6.10/10.

Filmink argued "This was Rank’s attempt at the big time – it had an American star (Kirk Douglas), director (Anthony Mann) and co-financier (Columbia). The resulting movie doesn’t quite work – it gives off the aura of a script that has been changed and re-changed – but is still entertaining with memorable moments, and if it didn’t become a Guns of Navarone type blockbuster that Rank would have hoped for, it did well in Britain and has never stopped playing on television."

== Other versions ==
Ray Mears made a documentary called The Real Heroes of Telemark. Despite mainly sticking to the factual evidence, some scenes in the documentary, like the film, were partly dramatised, focusing more on the survival skills involved in the operation.

The same story was also covered in the 1948 Franco-Norwegian film Kampen om tungtvannet (La bataille de l'eau lourde — "The battle for heavy water"). Quite faithful to the real events, it even had many of the original Norwegian commandos starring as themselves.

In 2015, the Norwegian Broadcasting Corporation showed a TV series called Kampen om tungtvannet (also known as The Heavy Water War or The Saboteurs) based on the events.

== See also ==
- Norwegian resistance movement
- Quisling regime
- Sigrid Augusta Green
- List of World War II films
