= Leif Tronstad =

Norwegian scientist and military officer (1903-1945)

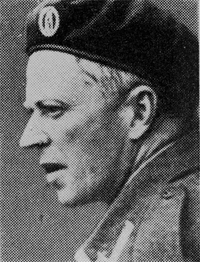
- Born: 27 March 1903; Bærum, Norway
- Died: 11 March 1945 (aged 41); Syrebekkstølen, Rauland Municipality, Norway
- Burial place: Vestre gravlund
- Relatives: Edla Obel (wife)
- Military career
- Allegiance: Norway
- Branch: Norwegian Army
- Service years: 1924–1927; 1940–1945
- Rank: Major
- Unit: Norwegian Independent Company 1
- Conflicts: World War II: Norwegian Campaign; Norwegian resistance movement †; Operation Gunnerside (planner)
- Awards: War Cross with sword Norwegian War Medal; Defence Medal 1940–1945; Order of the British Empire; Distinguished Service Order; Légion d'honneur Croix de Guerre Medal of Freedom
- Other work: Athlete, scientist

Leif Hans Larsen Tronstad (27 March 1903 – 11 March 1945) was a Norwegian inorganic chemist, intelligence officer and military organizer. He graduated from the Norwegian Institute of Technology in 1927 and was a prolific researcher and writer of academic publications. A professor of chemistry at the Norwegian Institute of Technology from 1936, he was among the pioneers of heavy water research, and was instrumental when a heavy water plant was built at Vemork.

After the invasion of Norway by Germany during World War II, Tronstad conducted domestic resistance for one year before fleeing the country for England. There, he gathered valuable intelligence from Norwegian sources, both on the development of the V-2 rocket and the growing German interest in heavy water. In 1943 Tronstad planned Operation Gunnerside, in which the German access to heavy water processing at Vemork was severely impeded. His information about the V-2 rocket contributed to the massive Allied bombing of Peenemünde.

For a long time Tronstad had wanted to return to Norway to organize resistance work, however he was prevented by the Norwegian military authorities in Britain. In 1944, he did travel to Norway, to organize Operation Sunshine, for the defence of Norwegian infrastructure. After five months in the country, he was killed in action after his team had taken the local bailiff hostage.

== Early life ==
Tronstad was born in Bærum Municipality; the son of Hans Larsen and Josefine Amalie Tronstad, Hans died three months before Leif was born. Leif thus grew up in Sandvika with his mother and four siblings. He graduated from middle school in 1918, with top grades in mathematics. He then embarked on thirty months of professional practice in two local electricity companies, which was a requirement to enrol at Kristiania Technical School, a predecessor of the Faculty of Engineering at Oslo University College. When he enrolled in 1920 he chose technical chemistry instead of electronic engineering. He graduated in 1922, the best chemistry student; a fellow student recalled that he "did not have to read anything more than once" in order to remember it. In the spring of 1923, he also took the examen artium after attending the Haagaas School for one year. He was ready to enroll at the Norwegian Institute of Technology, but waited one year, possibly wanting to strengthen his personal finances. In the meantime, he started on his compulsory military service.

He was an accomplished athlete and helped his hometown club Grane SK to two Norwegian 4 × 1500 metres relay records. The records were set in 1921 and 1923, but broken by the team IL i BUL in 1926. His brother John, a bronze medalist in 1500 metres at the 1917 Norwegian championships, was on the relay team as well. Both brothers used their father's name Larsen at the time; Leif took up his mother's name Tronstad later.

In 1924 Tronstad moved to Trondheim to study at the Norwegian Institute of Technology, graduating in 1927. His graduation paper was deemed exceptional and as such was reported to King Haakon of Norway. Regarded as a fully-fledged academic work, it was published scientifically in 1928. Tronstad had taken various stray jobs while studying, and also finished his military service, reaching the rank of Second Lieutenant in the Norwegian Army Corps of Weaponry in 1927. From 1927 to 1928 Tronstad worked briefly as an assistant at the Norwegian Institute of Technology as well as in a private company in Kristiansand. In 1928 he returned to the Norwegian Institute of Technology as a research fellow. In the same year, Tronstad married Edla Obel, who was nine years his junior, in Trondheim. The couple had two children.

== Academic career ==
Tronstad spent the first year of a research period as an assistant to Herbert Freundlich in Dahlem, Berlin. He studied the passivity of metal surfaces, and made a breakthrough when he managed to measure extremely thin oxide surface coatings, thus solving a problem dating from the time of Michael Faraday. He continued to Stockholm to study metallography under Carl Benedicks, and to elaborate further on his results from Berlin. The work was completed in 1931 and his thesis, spanning 250 pages, was published in German as Optische Untersuchungen zur Frage der Passivität des Eisens und Stahls. For it, he received the doctorate degree. He was hired at the Norwegian Institute of Technology as a lecturer in the summer of 1931, although he spent the first year at the University of Cambridge, conducting further research with a scholarship from a memorial fund of Christian Michelsen. The research at Cambridge was a continuation of his thesis work, but this time he tested his method on mercury.

Following the death in 1934 of a professor of technical inorganic chemistry at the Norwegian Institute of Technology, Tronstad was appointed his successor on 17 April 1936, effective from 1 May. At the time, he was one of the youngest professors in Norway. He was a member of the Royal Norwegian Society of Sciences and Letters, and in early 1940 he became vice president of the Norwegian Chemical Society. During his short scientific career, Tronstad penned about eighty scientific publications, including fourteen on heavy water-related topics.

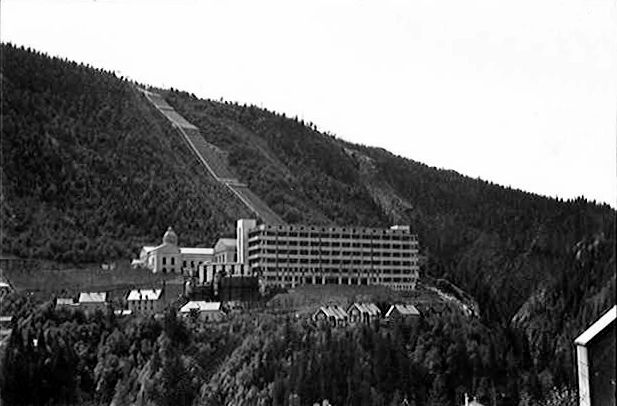
Vemork in 1935.

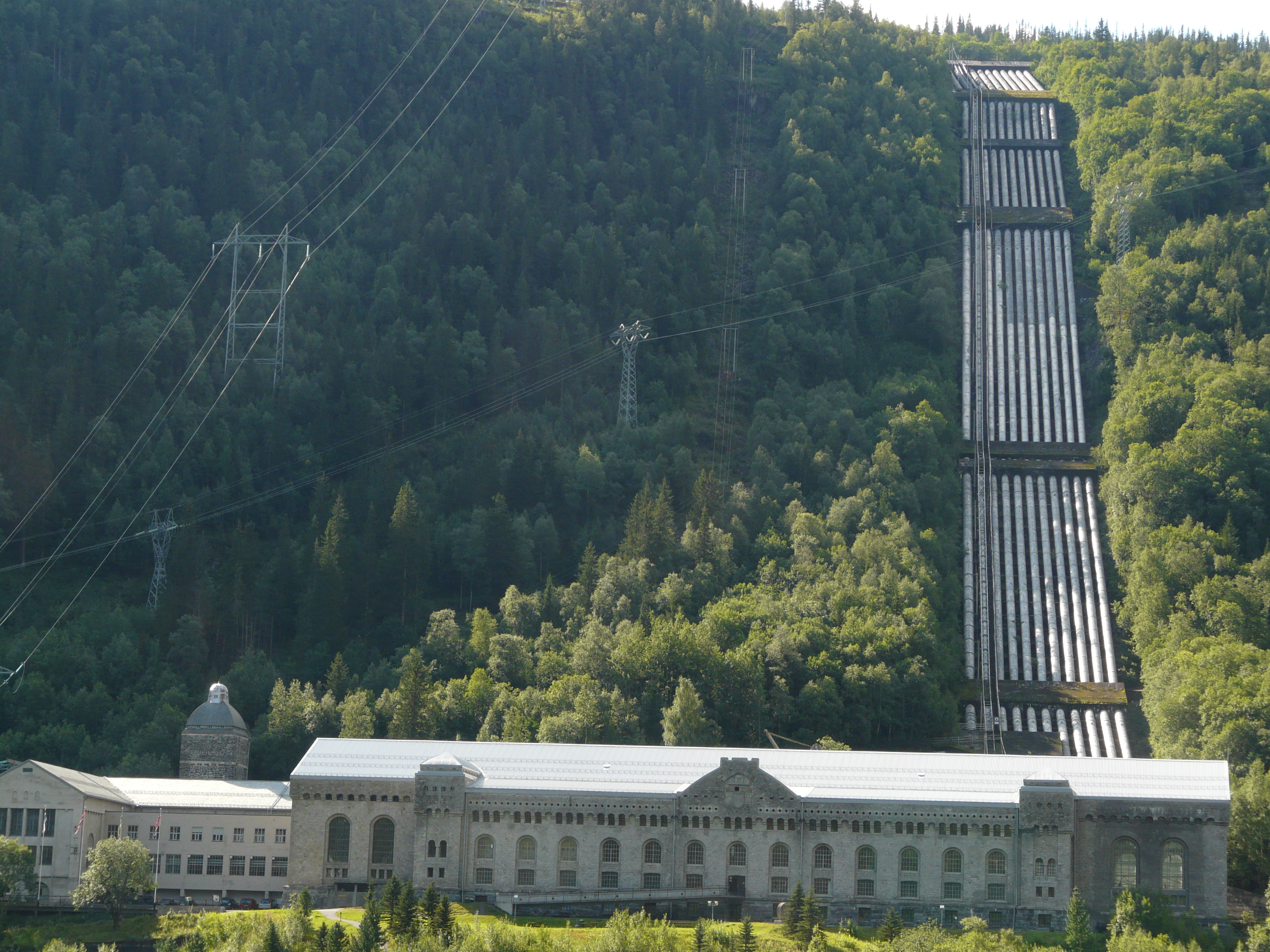
Vemork power station in 2008. The electrolyzing plant no longer exists.

The properties of heavy water had been discovered in 1932 by Harold Urey. In 1933, Leif Tronstad and Jomar Brun, the head of Norsk Hydro Rjukan, created a plan for industrial production of heavy water in Norway. As Norsk Hydro were already producing ammonia for nitrogen fertilizer, Tronstad and Brun had realized that large amounts of electrolyzed water were available. Tronstad was paid by Norsk Hydro as a consultant. Already in 1934, Norsk Hydro had opened a plant near the power station at Vemork. This was the world's first plant for industrial mass production of heavy water. Both French and German scientists expressed interest in the project.

== World War II ==
=== German invasion of Norway ===
Tronstad, holding a military rank, had a standing order to report to the Norwegian military headquarters in Oslo in the face of a military peril. When Germany invaded Norway on 9 April 1940, he first informed his students of the situation, and then drove towards Oslo. He brought his wife and children with him, but having no intention of taking them to a possible theatre of war, he left them in the Drivdalen valley. He continued alone but shortly after, upon learning that Oslo was the first city to fall to the invaders, he stopped at Dovre. The family had a cabin in the vicinity. Here, he helped organize volunteers from local rifle associations to form a line of defence meant to repel any advancing German forces. German Fallschirmjäger paratroops did land at nearby Dombås, but were surprised by a contingent of regular Norwegian forces already in the area, who ensured a tactical victory for Norway in the ensuing Battle of Dombås.

=== Resistance ===
When the Norwegian Campaign ended and the German occupation of Norway was a reality, Tronstad became involved in resistance work, largely based around the Norwegian Institute of Technology. He was associated with the radio agent group Skylark B, which had regular contact with London from January 1941. Among other things, he sent reports on the interest shown by German authorities in the heavy water plant at Vemork. One source of this information was Tronstad's old companion, Jomar Brun, still in charge of the plant, who also helped people to flee the country by sea, via the Møre coast. After exposure of the group in September 1941, Tronstad himself had to flee the country. Another resistance member, who had already been jailed, managed to warn Tronstad, who travelled from Trondheim to Oslo by train. The following day, the Gestapo visited his house to arrest him. After a few days in hiding, Tronstad was driven by car to Østfold, and then travelled on foot to Töcksfors via Ørje. From there he continued by plane to England, rejecting an offer of a civilian job in Sweden.

He reached England in October 1941. He already had a broad network of contacts there, stemming both from his academic career as well as from his radio operations. He also maintained several contacts abroad, including scientists whom he knew from the Norwegian Institute of Technology: Harald Wergeland and Njål Hole. The opportunity to work directly for the British was presented to Tronstad, but instead he chose to aim his efforts towards disrupting the German occupation of Norway and improving the Norwegian resistance work. He even wanted to enrol in active duty, but was stopped by the Norwegian military command, who considered him "too valuable" for the war theatre. Tronstad's foremost skill was that of organization, which he owed to his experience in science. Thus, Tronstad became a part of the staff of the Ministry of Defence, and later of the Norwegian High Command. From 1943, he headed a section in department 4 (FO IV). This had been established in December 1942 under the leadership of Colonel Bjarne Øen, and Tronstad was brought in as a reinforcement as the work burden increased. Also, he had recently been promoted from Captain to Major. Tronstad's section was responsible for the special operation towards industry and shipping; training of the Norwegian Independent Company 1 (Kompani Linge); technical advice on sabotage, and towards the end of the war also the protection of Norwegian industry. He established the Norwegian High Command Technical Committee, which included other Norwegian scientists-in-exile such as Svein Rosseland, Helmer Dahl and Gunnar Randers. The Technical Committee is considered as the precursor to the Norwegian Defence Research Establishment, established in 1946.

=== Heavy water sabotage ===
Already in 1941, Tronstad was aware that heavy water production at Vemork had greatly increased. In the beginning, Tronstad had not been aware of the connection between heavy water and atomic weaponry, but it eventually became clear that Germany could be running a nuclear energy project, especially after Harold Urey visited the United Kingdom in November 1941. Tronstad later learned from Jomar Brun that further expansion of heavy water production was being discussed. Brun had been a part of a small conference on the issue, hosted by Kurt Diebner in Berlin, in January 1942. Brun would later communicate with England through Einar Skinnarland, a covert Special Operations Executive agent hailing from Rjukan. In October 1942, Brun was summoned to England, reportedly at the request of Winston Churchill. Instead, a team of agents were parachuted into the area to gather more intelligence, under the codename Operation Grouse.

The idea of subjecting the heavy water facility at Vemork to heavy air bombing surfaced, but Tronstad was a staunch opponent of such an idea, which he saw as too hazardous. He warned of the presence of civil housing, and argued that bombing was not even guaranteed to succeed, given that the heavy water facility was located in the armoured basement of the electrolyzing plant. The first attempt to take out the facility, in November 1942, had consisted of British personnel using gliders to land near Vemork. The operation, codenamed Freshman, was a catastrophe, as all units except for one towing aircraft perished, either due to crash landings or in German captivity.

Tronstad then organized the next attempt. He had wanted to take an active part in the sabotage mission, but again he was stopped by his commanders, who regarded him as inexpendable. Tronstad and Brun supplied the would-be saboteurs with extensive knowledge of the facility, and organized the training. The operation, codenamed Gunnerside and led by Joachim Rønneberg, was carried out successfully between 27 and 28 February 1943. However, after three months, Germany managed to resume production. Against the will of Tronstad, in July 1943, an American-led raid by 161 aircraft bombed Vemork as well as the shipment yard at Herøya. The two bombings claimed the lives of 76 people, many of whom were civilian. The heavy water plant was not directly affected by the bombing, nevertheless production was halted due to a damaged generator. The Germans then tried to disassemble the production facility, followed by a retreat from Vemork with the remaining stock of heavy water. This resulted in the sinking of SF Hydro by Norwegian saboteurs, halting the heavy water transport, but again claiming many civilian lives. Tronstad had given his consent to the latter operation, reportedly with a "heavy heart".

Concealed listening posts at Rjukan and Notodden also revealed high-level German discussions of long-range weaponry. The place name Peenemünde was frequently mentioned. As this intelligence reaching Tronstad's ear via his contacts in Norway, he forwarded it to the British. As a result, the Royal Air Force bombed the Army Research Center of Peenemünde in August 1943. Further raids were made by the US Army Air Force in July and August 1944. The bombing halted the weapons program there, which centered around development of the V-1 flying bomb and the V-2 rocket. Fellow scientists Rideal and Evans later wrote that Tronstad "contributed directly to the speedy victory of the Allied Nations, besides saving the region which came to be known as 'Southern England' from an even longer and more severe ordeal than it actually endured".

=== Operation Sunshine ===
In 1944, when the tide of war was turning against Germany, the German forces started to retreat from Northern Norway. However, they used scorched earth tactics as they retreated. Consequently, Tronstad started to plan how to organize a defence of industrial sites in Southern Norway. The first plan pertained to Upper Telemark, and was codenamed Operation Sunshine. Its basic principle was to build a defence force from the existing Milorg pockets in the district. Tronstad, who earlier had been stopped from travelling to Norway himself, did so this time. He felt that it was time to deal a decisive blow to a dwindling German war power, and called for the "full effort ... from all who would be called men".

Tronstad was parachuted into Hardangervidda on 4 October 1944, together with eight Norwegian Independent Company 1 members. The group included Gunnar Syverstad, Jens-Anton Poulsson and Claus Helberg. They lived in a small cabin built by Einar Skinnarland.

However, after a few months a situation arose that could compromise the operation. It was feared that Torgeir Lognvik, the bailiff installed by the Nazis in Rauland Municipality, had become suspicious. Thus, the people behind Operation Sunshine created a plan to lure him to the mountains, and capture and interrogate him there. On 11 March 1945, resistance member Jon Landsverk managed to travel with Torgeir Lognvik towards the mountains on the pretext of showing him some stolen goods. The two were soon met by Gunnar Syverstad and Einar Skinnarland, who captured the bailiff. He was taken to a lodge in the hills of Syrebekkstølen, where he was to be interrogated by Landsverk, Syverstad and Tronstad. However, on the same day, Torgeir's brother Johans became suspicious and decided to follow the ski trails, which led him to Syrebekkstølen. Armed, he entered the lodge, firing several shots, taking the Resistance fighters by surprise. Gunnar Syverstad was killed in the initial attack. Torgeir, who was not bound, grabbed a rifle. In the struggle, Tronstad charged at Johans, but was killed. The two brothers then escaped. Jon Landsverk survived, and together with Einar Skinnarland he disposed of the two bodies in a lake. However, the next day the bodies were found and burned by German forces. After the war, Jon Landsverk testified against the Lognvik brothers as a part of the legal purge in Norway after World War II. While Landsverk claimed that the wounded Tronstad had been killed by a blow from the butt of a rifle held by Torgeir, the court found Johans guilty of both murders, and Torgeir of attempted murder. Johans was sentenced to a ten-year prison term, and Torgeir to a five-year term.

=== Diaries ===
Tronstad's coded diaries from 1941 to 1945 are preserved, and the 13 original books are kept by the National Archival Services of Norway. They have been transcribed and made available to historians, and are regarded as an important source of information from the "outer front".

== Awards and legacy ==
Tronstad had a military funeral on 30 May 1945, being buried at Vestre gravlund in Oslo. He was awarded Norway's highest decoration for military gallantry, the War Cross with sword, as well as the Norwegian War Medal and the Defence Medal 1940–1945. In addition to his Norwegian decorations, Tronstad received the Order of the British Empire, Chevalier of the French Légion d'honneur and Croix de Guerre and the US Medal of Freedom with bronze palm as well as the British Distinguished Service Order.

A memorial stone was raised at Syrebekkstølen, commemorating the death of Tronstad and Gunnar Syverstad. Also, several streets in Norway have been named after him. A statue of Tronstad today stands at the square Leif Tronstads plass in Sandvika, the administrative centre of Bærum. It was commissioned in 1965 by the local Rotary club, and erected in 1973. Abstract, it was sculpted by Fritz Røed.
