= Gunnar Syverstad =

Norwegian resistance member (1910–1945)

- Born: 6 February 1910; Horten, Norway
- Died: 11 March 1945 (aged 35)
- Awards: British Empire Medal

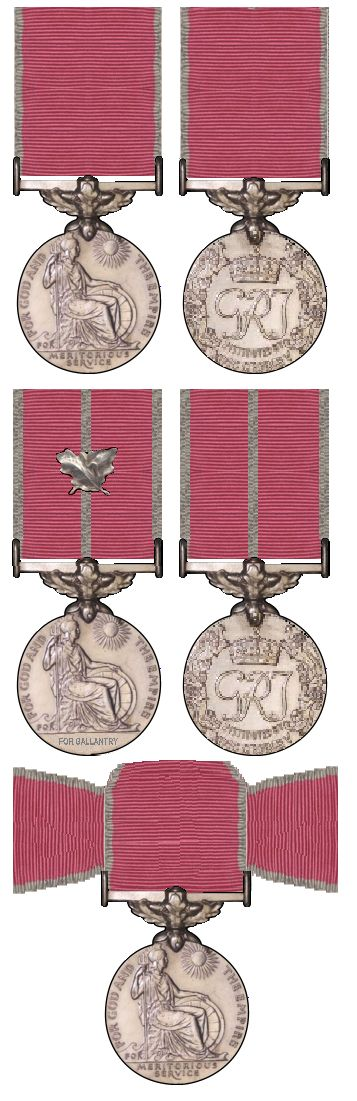
British Empire Medal

Gunnar Bryde Syverstad, BEM (6 February 1910 – 11 March 1945) was a Norwegian resistance member. He is known for his assistance in the Norwegian heavy water sabotage.

He was born in Horten, Norway. his mother was from that city and his father was from Glemmen in Østfold county. He later moved to Rjukan where he was laboratory assistant at the Vemork hydroelectric power plant outside Rjukan in Tinn Municipality, Norway.

He fled to Great Britain in February 1944, where he became a member of the Special Operations Executive. He returned to Norway, being parachuted in over Hardangervidda, to participate in the Operation Sunshine with Leif Tronstad. Syverstad and Tronstad were both killed in a shooting incident 11 March 1945.

== Other sources ==
- Jensen, Erling; Per Ratvik; Ragnar Ulstein (1948) Kompani Linge ISBN 82-445-0057-3
- Berg, John (1986) Soldaten som ikke ville gi seg (Metope) ISBN 82-403-0002-2
- Poulsson, Jens-Anton (1944-1945) Tungtvannssabotasjen, kampen om atombomben 1942-1944 ISBN 82-458-0803-2
- Dahl, Per F. (1999) Heavy water and the wartime race for nuclear energy (Taylor & Francis) ISBN 978-0-7503-0633-1
