= Operation Freshman =

Codename of a British operation during WWII

Coordinates: 59°52′16″N 8°29′29″E

- Part of the Second World War
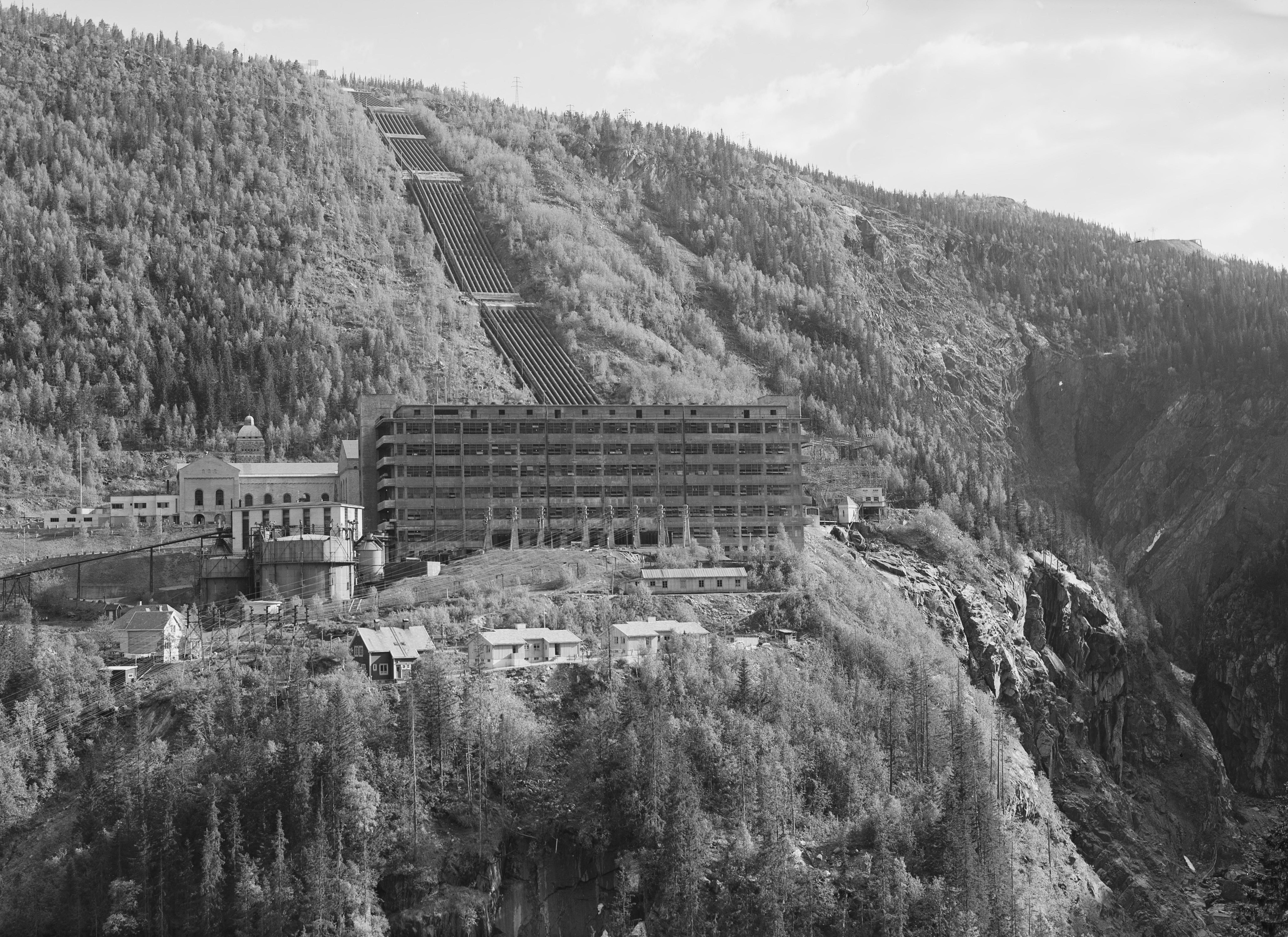
- The Vemork hydroelectric plant, circa 1947
- Type: Sabotage
- Location: Telemark, Norway
- Planned by: Combined Operations Headquarters; SOE
- Objective: Destroy German heavy water production at Vemork
- Date: 19 November 1942
- Executed by: 34 glider borne commandos
- Outcome: Failure
- Casualties: 41 killed, 2 Horsa gliders and 1 Halifax bomber lost

Operation Freshman was the codename given to a British airborne operation conducted in November 1942 during World War II. It was the first British airborne operation using Airspeed Horsa gliders, and its target was the Vemork Norsk Hydro hydrogen electrolysis plant in Telemark, Norway which produced heavy water as a by-product.

By 1942, the German nuclear weapons programme had come close to being able to develop a nuclear reactor, but for the reactor to function it would require a great deal of heavy water. The source of the heavy water was the Norsk Hydro plant, which had been occupied since 1940.

When the British government learned of the German nuclear developments, it was decided that a raid would be launched to destroy the plant and deny the Germans the heavy water required to develop a nuclear weapon. Several plans were discussed and discarded as impractical; it was decided that a small airborne force composed of sappers from the Royal Engineer units attached to 1st Airborne Division would land by glider, a short distance from the plant, demolish it with explosives and then escape over the Norwegian border into Sweden. After an extensive training period, the airborne force took off in two aircraft–glider combinations on the night of 19 November 1942. Both the gliders and tugs were operated by aircrews attached to HQ No. 38 Wing RAF.

The tugs and gliders managed to reach the Norwegian coast, but neither was able to reach their objective. The first pair suffered from navigational difficulties and severe weather, which resulted in the tow rope snapping and the first glider crash-landing, with its Halifax tug aircraft returning to base. Three airborne troops were killed and the survivors were captured shortly after the crash. The second pair fared even worse, with both the aircraft and glider crashing into a mountain after the aircraft flew low in search of the first glider. Both members of the glider crew were killed instantly, while one soldier passenger died soon afterwards from his injuries. Those who survived the crashes were captured by German forces and killed as a result of Wehrmacht's Commando Order, which stated that any Allied personnel captured while involved in commando operations were to be killed immediately. At the end of the war, the Wehrmacht personnel involved were tried, sentenced to death and executed for their part in the murders.

== Background ==
The German government began development of an atomic weapons programme after two scientists, Lise Meitner and her nephew Otto Frisch, declared in the February 11, 1939 issue of the scientific journal Nature that atomic fission was possible and could release immense amounts of energy. By September 1941, the German scientists assigned to the programme had determined how a nuclear reactor could be developed. This required significant quantities of heavy water to act as a neutron moderator to encase the uranium which would be used to provide the material for a nuclear weapon. Heavy water was extremely scarce and difficult to produce, and Germany only possessed a small amount which had been produced in laboratories. Norway possessed a large stockpile which was produced by the Vemork Norsk Hydro chemical plant near the village of Rjukan, but the Norwegian government would not sell more than three gallons of heavy water a month, becoming suspicious of the sudden increase in demand for the water by the German government. When Norway was invaded and occupied by Germany in April 1940 this obstruction ended; the Vemork plant was captured and began producing heavy water for the German atomic weapons programme. Production of heavy water was slowed initially due to the effects of the fighting in Norway and a drought in the area, which led to a lack of water to provide hydroelectric power for the plant. Once the weather improved and snow began to melt, providing enough water to create sufficient hydroelectric power, production continued.

By mid-1942 it had come to the attention of the British government that the plant had begun to produce large quantities of heavy water and was stockpiling it for later use. The decision was therefore taken that the plant and the stockpiles of heavy water would have to be destroyed in order to impede the German programme. Several methods for destroying the plant were considered. The first was a mass raid by Royal Air Force (RAF) bombers, but this was rejected due to the difficulty in locating the plant during night bombing, the principal bombing tactic used by the RAF at the time, and the heavy casualties that would be inflicted on the local Norwegian population during a night raid. An attack by Norwegian saboteurs was also ruled out, as was landing troops by PBY Catalina flying boat on Lake Møsvatn, 15 miles (24 km) from the target, the latter due to the steepness of the surrounding mountain slopes and the inability of flying boats to land on the ice. It was decided that a raid by glider-borne airborne troops would have the greatest chance of success. The area around the plant would be difficult to land on, but a possible landing site for gliders was located near the Møsvatn dam, although it would require considerable skill on the part of the glider pilots in order to land safely.

== Preparations ==
=== Operation Grouse ===
In March 1942 the British Special Operations Executive (SOE) had recruited Einar Skinnarland, a Norwegian engineer who worked at the Møsvatn dam. Skinnarland had successfully sailed to Britain and was parachuted back to Telemark after ten days of intensive training. Having several contacts within Vemork he was able to roughly identify the disposition of German troops and other defences. Additionally SOE decided to send an advance party of Norwegian agents into Telemark, and began intensively training a four-man team over the summer. The party, code-named Operation Grouse, was led by Jens-Anton Poulsson and also included Knut Haugland, Claus Helberg and Arne Kjelstrup. The Norwegians, all people local to the area with exceptional outdoors skills, underwent extra outdoor training in Scotland as well as learning the skills necessary to operate in occupied territory; including sabotage, radio transmitting and "irregular warfare".

The Grouse team were ready to be inserted by October. Several flights were made but aborted due to bad weather, before the team finally dropped on 18 October. The team landed at Fjarefit on the Hardangervidda (a large wilderness avoided by the German forces) and spent the next 15 days trekking towards Møsvatn, where they made contact with Skinnarland's brother, Torstein. Once they had established contact with London the party began making preparations for the arrival of the British commandos. A suitable glider landing site was chosen 3 miles (4.8 km) south west of Møsvatn dam and the team reconnoitred the area to help Combined Operations decide the best way to attack the plant.

==== German defences ====
The geography of the area around the village and the plant meant that attacking the plant and destroying the existing stocks of heavy water would be extremely difficult. Both were situated in a deep valley which possessed thickly–forested sides that rose almost vertically from a narrow river–bed, and which was overlooked by Gaustatoppen, a mountain approximately 5,400 feet (1,600 m) high; the plant itself had been built on a broad rock shelf 1,000 feet (300 m) above the river bed.

Einar Skinnarland had observed the German defences over the summer and passed the information back to SOE. Later reconnaissance by Torstein Skinnarland and the Grouse team was also transmitted to London in the weeks leading up to the operation. In early October Generaloberst Nikolaus von Falkenhorst, the commander in chief of the German forces in Norway, had visited the plant. While there he warned the local garrison that he believed the plant was a likely target for British commando raids, but crucially he did not have the resources to increase the manpower there. Although Einar Skinnarland had observed a garrison of 100 men in the village of Rjukan, 20 at the dam and about 55 near the main plant during the summer, by October this had been reduced to about 12 at the plant, 12 at the dam and approximately 40 in Rjukan. Most of the men were elderly or infirm Austrians under the command of an elderly captain, although well trained German regulars periodically passed through Telemark. Skinnarland also believed that Gestapo agents were in the area.

The Germans had erected three iron hawsers across the valley to prevent low flying bombing raids but on the ground most of their defences were positioned to prevent an assault from the ridge above the plant, the direction from which they believed an attack was most likely. Minefields and booby traps predominantly protected this side of the plant, but there were also searchlights on the roof and a machine gun nest near the entrance. A single bridge crossed the steep gorge in front of the plant, but was normally only protected by two guards. There were 300,000 German troops in Norway at this time and reinforcements could quickly be called into the area, which would complicate the commandos' escape to the Swedish border.

=== Planning ===
The Headquarters staff of Combined Operations at the War Office was tasked with devising a plan for the glider-borne assault on the plant, as it had been with previous airborne and commando operations, such as Operation Biting. This was the first British airborne operation ever to use gliders; all previous operations had been conducted solely with parachutists. The staff decided that although gliders would be the most suitable for the operation due to the heavy loads to be carried by the airborne troops, and the possibility that they could be widely dispersed if they were dropped by parachute, the airborne troops would still be trained for a possible parachute insertion if the landing zone for the gliders was found to be unsuitable. Because of the complicated and technical nature of the operation, which would see the plant rigged with explosives and then detonated, it was believed that a minimum of twelve to sixteen men was required, and that they would all have to be skilled engineers. The important nature of the operation also led to the force being doubled in order to duplicate it, to ensure that even if half of the force were killed, the survivors would have the necessary skills to complete the operation. The selected troops were volunteer parachutists chosen from the sappers of 9th Field Company (Airborne) Royal Engineers and 261st Field Park Company (Airborne) Royal Engineers attached to 1st Airborne Division, because the only parachute-trained Royal Engineers unit in existence at the time, 1st Parachute Squadron Royal Engineers, was already deployed in North Africa with 1st Parachute Brigade. Both of the duplicated units that were to participate in the operation were to be commanded by officers from the Royal Engineers; the first by Lieutenant A.C. Allen and the second by Second-Lieutenant M.D. Green, who was later replaced by Lieutenant D.A. Methven when he was injured during a training accident three days before the operation was to begin.

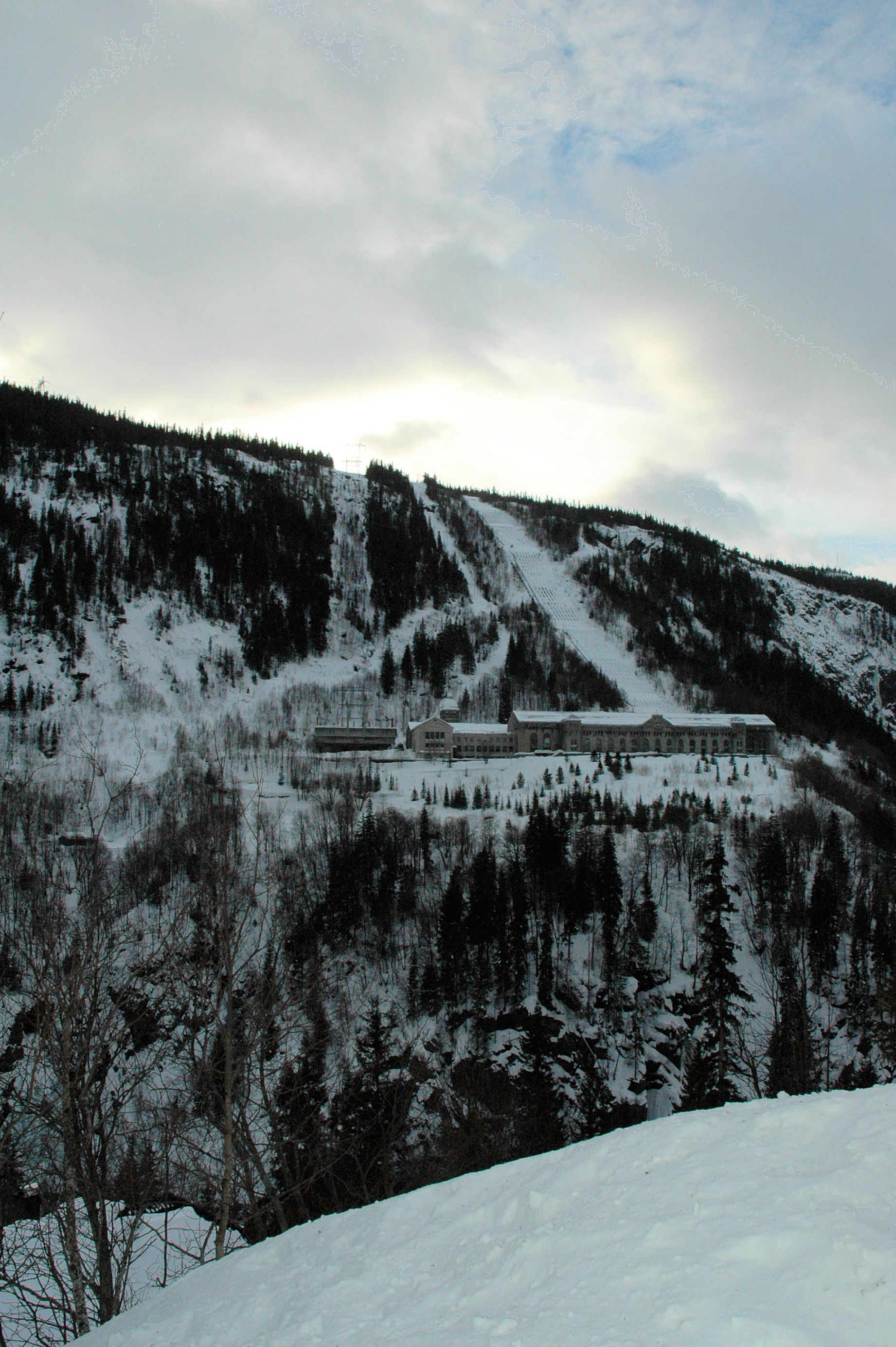
The Vemork hydroelectric plant in snow in 2008

The Royal Air Force unit selected to transport the sappers was 38 Wing, which was commanded by Group Captain T.B. Cooper; it was provided with a special allotment of three Handley Page Halifax heavy bombers for the operation, which were the only British aircraft in existence at the time which were capable of towing Horsa gliders the distance required and then returning to their base. The SOE agents selected a landing zone for the sappers, which was approximately 5 kilometres (3.1 mi) from the Norsk Hydro plant and could not be observed by German patrols. The plan for the operation called for the sappers to land in the two gliders at the landing zone, guided in by the SOE agents equipped with Eureka radio beacons. Once they had successfully landed, the sappers would be escorted to the plant by the SOE agents, demolish the plant and its stocks of heavy water, and then cross the Norwegian border into neutral Sweden.

Combined Operations initially suggested the men should fight their way to the Swedish border, but MI9 believed their chances of survival were better if they attempted to disguise themselves as Norwegians and travel in pairs. In order to facilitate their escape the men were provided with civilian clothes (to be worn after the operation), simple Norwegian phrases (in the hope no German they encountered would speak Norwegian) and escape sets containing money and maps. They were also ordered to shave any moustaches and grow their hair long in order to blend in with Norwegian men.

=== Training ===
Training began in early October in Wales and was designed to be extremely arduous, not only to ensure that those who took part were at the peak of their physical and mental fitness, but also to eliminate any men unable to cope with the long marches and difficult terrain that would be encountered during the operation. When this portion of the training had been completed, the sappers were then transferred to the area around Fort William in Scotland, where they were familiarised with a hydroelectric plant similar in design to the one in Norway, and received training on the most efficient way to plant explosives in the Norsk Hydro plant to cause maximum damage.

Training also took place at Port Sunlight, where they were shown how to destroy large condensers of the kind found in the plant. The sappers were given detailed briefings on the plant and the surrounding area, and were trained on large models and mock-ups of the buildings that the plant was composed of, all based on information provided by the SOE agents who had arrived earlier in the month. Because the operation was considered to be extremely important, and its results vital to the Allied war effort, security efforts were extremely thorough. A cover story was provided for the sappers as they conducted their training; a rumour was spread that they were training to compete against a company of American engineers in a fictional 'Washington Cup' athletic event, which involved a long route march to be completed either by glider or parachute, followed by a complex demolition task and finally a demanding endurance test. The departure airfield was also sealed off to civilians and non-essential military personnel, and all mail and telephone calls were censored.

== Operation ==
After their training had been completed, on 17 November the sappers were transported to RAF Skitten, Killimster in Scotland, with the operation scheduled to commence two days later. On the evening of 19 November, Group Captain Cooper, with the aid of a Norwegian meteorologist and regular reports from the SOE agents stationed near the landing zone, decided that although the weather was not perfect, it would be best to launch the operation that night; Cooper believed that if it were delayed, the weather might deteriorate on subsequent days and prevent the operation from being conducted entirely. The first aircraft–glider combination took off from the airfield at 17:50, with the second following at 18:10; after circling the airfield several times the two combinations headed out across the North Sea towards their objective.

=== The first combination ===
The first combination flew through poor weather conditions and managed to reach Norway and fly towards its objective. During the flight over Norway the Rebecca receiver, which was supposed to pick up the transponder signal from the Eureka beacons being used by the Norwegian SOE agents, developed a mechanical problem and was unable to pick up the signal. This left the aircrew with only map-reading available to locate the landing zone, but the poor weather made this almost impossible.

On a second attempt to find the correct area, the combination flew into thick clouds approximately 40 miles (64 km) northwest of Rjukan, and ice began to form on both aircraft and glider, as well as the towing rope connecting the two. At this point the combination began to lose altitude, and the towing rope snapped, setting the glider free; low on fuel, the aircraft was forced to turn back after signaling to Skitten at 23:55 that it had released the glider, and only just succeeded in landing back in Britain. Shortly after releasing the glider, the aircraft broadcast a second message, "Glider in sea", indicating the air crew's belief that the glider had crashed. The Royal Navy was asked to begin a search-and-rescue mission, but had no ships in the area; an aerial search of the area was instead conducted, but did not find the glider.

The glider crash-landed in an area called Fyljesdal, overlooking Lysefjord. Of the seventeen men on board, three were killed outright.

Thorvald Fylgjedalen, a local farmer, found some of the injured soldiers from the glider, but knew no English, and was unable to communicate with them. Nonetheless, Fylgjedalen and his neighbour Jonas Haaheller decided that they would assist the wounded soldiers, and did not contact the German authorities. After contacting more of the local residents, the soldiers asked for their assistance in escaping to Sweden, but Haaheller and others convinced them that this would be impossible, as it would involve travelling across the entirety of Norway. Thus, the Norwegians sheltered and gave medical attention to the injured soldiers, but did not allow any of them to leave. The Norwegians also burned all of the maps and documents from the glider crash before the Germans could arrive, and managed to keep the entire operation secret for almost twenty-four hours.

German soldiers, including troops from both the Waffen SS and the Army, arrived the next afternoon on two boats from a nearby camp. They took the British soldiers prisoner, and departed with them on the boats. Despite the grave injuries suffered by some of the soldiers, they were still forced to walk under their own power and ride in the unsheltered boats in the cold. The dead soldiers were buried in a shallow grave.

=== The second combination ===
The glider crash sites in Norway. The glider from the first combination came down at Fyljesdal, the tug and glider of the second combination crashed near Helleland.

The second combination managed to reach the coast of Norway, but fared even worse than the first combination; because of a turn in the weather, the tow aircraft (second Halifax) piloted by Flight Lieutenant Roland Parkinson, RCAF, released the glider and then crashed into a mountain at Hestadfjell in high winds, rain and hail. All of the aircrew were killed instantly. Workmen in the area heard the plane pass overhead shortly before crashing and alerted the German authorities, who arrived quickly. Finding no survivors, the Germans threw the bodies of the aircrew into a nearby bog and left the area.

Released just before the tow aircraft crashed, the second glider spiralled out of control and crash-landed in the mountains between Helleland Municipality and Bjerkreim Municipality. The two RAAF pilot and copilot of the glider, Norman Davies and Herbert Fraser, were killed instantly and the rest were injured to varying degrees, one of whom, 25 year old Driver Ernest Pendlebury, died soon after. The survivors were unwilling to leave the seriously wounded so two of the British soldiers left the crash site to search for help. After searching for some time, they arrived in the hamlet of Helleland about 2 miles (3.2 km) from where they had crashed, and made contact with one of the local residents, Trond Hovland. The soldiers told Hovland about their injured comrades, and asked if he could help them find a doctor. Hovland agreed to help, but informed them that the nearest doctor lived 9.3 miles (15.0 km) away, in the town of Egersund. In order to contact him, Hovland would have to use the telephone system, controlled by the German authorities, which would alert them to the presence of the soldiers. Believing that there was no alternative, the soldiers agreed to contact the Germans, expecting that they would be taken as prisoners of war. A party from the Norwegian Labour Service arrived at the crash site shortly afterwards and helped tend to the injured soldiers who burned all of their sensitive documents and materials. A German party arrived about twenty minutes later. Unwilling to abandon the wounded and doubting their chances of escaping to Sweden, Lieutenant Allen chose to surrender, believing that they would be treated as POWs. Underneath their uniforms, the soldiers wore civilian clothing and had been told to grow their hair and beards. With this, and the fact that sabotage equipment was found, Colonel Probst, the head of the Wehrmacht in the Stavanger district, had all survivors executed as partisans at the German camp at Slettebø near Egersund.

== Aftermath ==
The Allies were unaware of the fate of the operation until they intercepted a German communiqué stating that two gliders and one aircraft had been forced down, and the crews engaged and annihilated. On 11 December they received a message from an SOE agent explaining that the second glider's occupants had all been shot. Many of the details about the fate of the two glider combinations were only discovered after the war had ended.

None of the soldiers or aircrew who survived the crashes remained alive for very long. Of the soldiers from the first glider, three of the four injured men were tortured by the Gestapo and later killed by Stabsarzt [Dr] Werner Fritz Seeling who injected air into their bloodstreams. The fourth injured man was shot in the back of the head the next day. All four bodies were dumped at sea. The five uninjured men were held at Grini concentration camp until 18 January 1943, when they were taken to nearby woods, blindfolded and executed by the Gestapo. The German Wehrmacht and the Gestapo argued over the fate of the prisoners from the second glider. The Wehrmacht believed they should be treated in accordance with the Geneva Convention, but in the end the survivors were interrogated and executed within a few hours of their capture at the German barracks at Bekkebø. They were taken into nearby woods and shot one by one, each being forced to listen to the man before him being executed. Their bodies were stripped and thrown into an unmarked grave. All of the executions were conducted in accordance with the Commando Order issued by the Wehrmacht High Command in October 1942, which stated that all Allied commando troops were to be killed immediately upon capture. The local Norwegian population were unable to prevent the prisoners being executed, but tended the graves of the dead until the end of the war.

Although the Allied soldiers believed that they had burnt all of their maps, one from the second glider was missed. When the Germans found it they were able to identify the Vemork plant as the target and increased their defence accordingly. German reprisals started instantly and 200 armed Gestapo agents swept into Rjukan where they arrested 21 Norwegians for questioning, but the members of Operation Grouse slipped away into the wilderness of Hardangervidda. They later contributed to the successful Operation Gunnerside in February 1943, when a small team of Norwegian SOE agents were parachuted into the area and destroyed much of the heavy water equipment in Vemork plant. The plant eventually resumed operation, but further bombing raids ensured it produced little heavy water for the German atomic weapons programme.

Although the operation had been a failure, it demonstrated the range, flexibility and possibilities of airborne forces and glider operations, and also highlighted equipment failures that were rectified for later operations. This included developing a new version of the Rebecca-Eureka homing device system, the Mk II, which was ready by 1943 and proved to be very successful when used in later airborne operations; during Operation Market Garden and Operation Varsity, aircraft that used the system reported a 95% success rate.

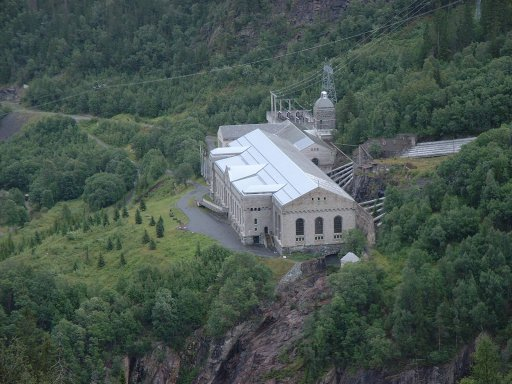
The Vemork Hydroelectric Plant as it looks today. Heavy water production took place in the now-demolished Hydrogen Production Plant, formerly situated to the left (i.e. in front) of the building in the picture.

When 1st Airborne Division arrived in Norway in May 1945, they were informed of the fate of the prisoners, and cooperated with the Norwegian government to have the men buried with full military honours. The five from the first glider were re-interred at the Commonwealth War Graves plot at Vestre Gravlund near Oslo. The second glider's occupants were reburied at Eiganes churchyard in Stavanger and the Halifax aircrew were reburied at Helleland.

The head of the Gestapo in Oslo, who had signed the order for the prisoners' executions, killed himself several days prior to 1st Airborne Division's arrival in May 1945, but several Wehrmacht personnel implicated in the decision to execute the prisoners were put on trial and found guilty: Dr Seeling was shot 10 January 1946 at Akershus Prison, Oslo; Hauptscharführer Erich Hoffman was hanged 15 May 1946 in Hameln, Germany; whilst Unterscharführer Fritz Feuerlein who had shot a prisoner in the back of the head was sentenced to life imprisonment but was extradited to the Soviet Union for alleged abuse conducted against Soviet prisoners. The commander of the German forces in Norway – Generaloberst Nikolaus von Falkenhorst – was also found guilty of two of the Freshman deaths during his war crimes trial. Sven Hedin intervened on his behalf on 4 December 1946, with the argument that von Falkenhorst had likewise striven to pardon the ten Norwegians condemned to death. The sentence was later commuted to twenty years' imprisonment. Falkenhorst was released from Werl Prison on 23 July 1953, due to bad health and died in 1968.

== Bibliography ==
- Berglyd, Jostein (2007). Operation Freshman: The Hunt for Hitlers Heavy Water. Solna: Leandoer & Ekholm. ISBN 978-9197589598.
- Dahl, Per F. (1999). Heavy Water and the Wartime Race for Nuclear Energy. London: CRC Press. ISBN 1844157369.
- DeGroot, Gerard (2004). The Bomb: A History of Hell on Earth. London: Penguin Books. ISBN 0712677488.
- Harclerode, Peter (2005). Wings Of War – Airborne Warfare 1918–1945. London: Pimlico. ISBN 0304367303.
- Lynch, Tim (2008). Silent Skies: Gliders At War 1939–1945. Barnsley: Pen & Sword Military. ISBN 978-0750306331.
- Mears, Ray (2004). The Real Heroes of Telemark. BBC. ISBN 0340830166.
- Otway, Lieutenant-Colonel T.B.H. (1990). The Second World War 1939–1945 Army–Airborne Forces. London: Imperial War Museum. ISBN 0901627577.
- Wiggan, Richard (1986). Operation Freshman. London: William Kimber. ISBN 071830571X.
