= Nore Hydroelectric Power Station =

Hydroelectric power station in Norway

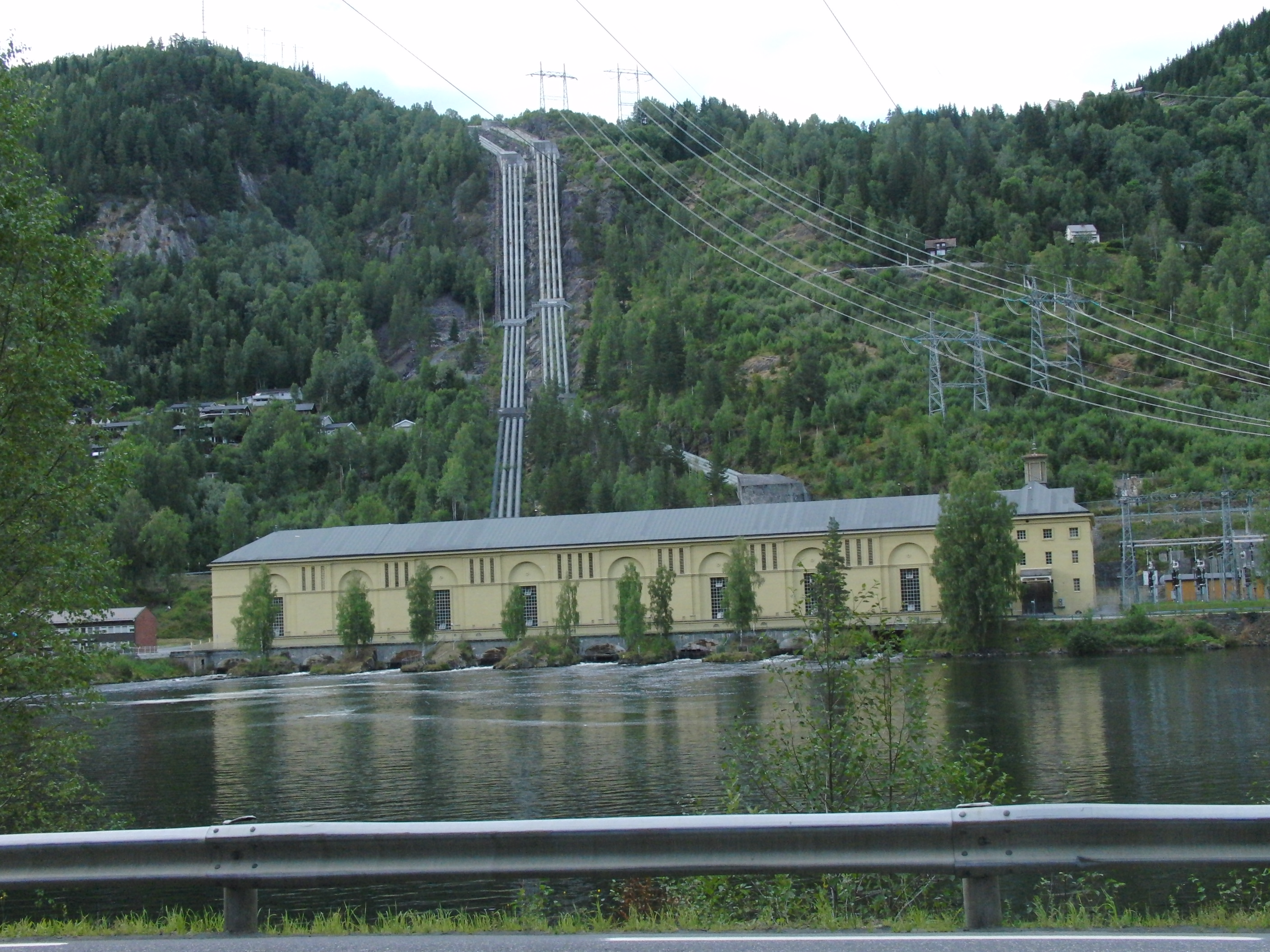
- Nore Hydroelectric Power Station
- Official name: Nore I kraftverk
- Country: Norway
- Location: Nore og Uvdal Municipality
- Coordinates: 60°16′03″N 8°57′28″E
- Status: Operational
- Commission date: 1928; 98 years ago
- Owner: Statkraft
- Operator: Statkraft Energi

Tidal power station
- Tidal range: 361 m (1,184 ft)

Power generation
- Units operational: 8
- Units planned: 8 × 27 MW
- Nameplate capacity: 206 MW
- Capacity factor: 63.1%
- Annual net output: 1,137 GW·h

External links
- Commons: Related media on Commons

The Nore Power Station is a hydroelectric power station located in the village of Rødberg in Nore og Uvdal Municipality in Buskerud county, Norway. The oldest plant Nore I operates at an installed capacity of 206 megawatts (276,000 hp), with an average annual production of 1,110 gigawatt-hours (4,000 TJ). The plant Nore II has an installed capacity of 52 megawatts (70,000 hp), with an average annual production of 314 gigawatt-hours (1,130 TJ).
