= Norwegian heavy water sabotage =

World War II operations

Norwegian Heavy Water Sabotage
- Part of World War II
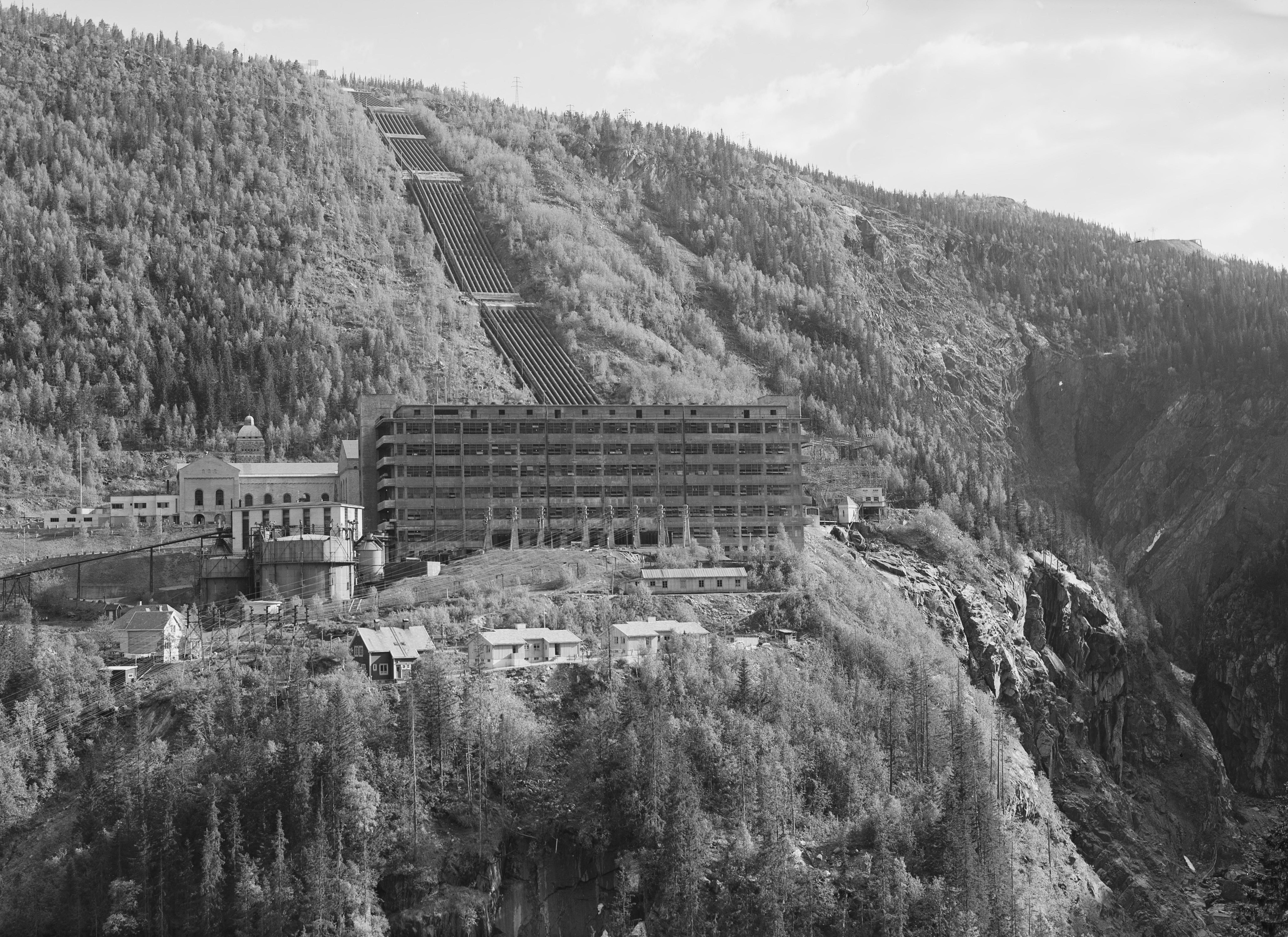
- Vemork hydroelectric power plant, c. 1947
| Date | 1940–1944 |
| Location | Telemark, Norway |
| Result | Allied victory |

The Norwegian heavy water sabotage (Bokmål: Tungtvannsaksjonen; Nynorsk: Tungtvassaksjonen) was a series of Allied-led efforts to halt Nazi German heavy water (deuterium) production via hydroelectric plants in German-occupied Norway during World War II, involving both Norwegian commandos and Allied bombing raids. During the war, the Allies sought to inhibit the German development of nuclear weapons with the removal of heavy water and the destruction of heavy-water production plants. The Norwegian heavy water sabotage was aimed at the 60 MW Vemork power station at the Rjukan waterfall in Telemark.

The hydroelectric power plant at Vemork was built in 1934. It was the world's first site to mass-produce heavy water (as a byproduct of nitrogen fixing), with a capacity of 1.2 tonnes per year. Before the German invasion of Norway on 9 April 1940, the French Deuxième Bureau removed 185 kilograms (408 lb) of heavy water from the Vemork plant in then-neutral Norway. The plant's managing director agreed to lend France the heavy water for the duration of the war. The French transported it secretly to Oslo, then to Perth, Scotland, and then to France. The plant was still capable of producing heavy water, however, and the Allies were concerned that the Germans would use the facility to produce more.

Between 1940 and 1944, a series of sabotage actions by the Norwegian resistance movement and Allied bombing ensured the destruction of the plant and the loss of its heavy water. These operations—code-named Grouse, Freshman, and Gunnerside—knocked the plant out of production in early 1943. In Operation Grouse, the British Special Operations Executive (SOE) successfully placed an advance team of four Norwegians on the Hardanger Plateau above the plant in October 1942. The unsuccessful Operation Freshman was mounted the following month by British paratroopers, who were to rendezvous with the Operation Grouse Norwegians and proceed to Vemork. This attempt failed when the military gliders (and one of their tugs, a Handley Page Halifax) crashed short of their destination. Except for the crew of one Halifax bomber, all the participants were killed in the crashes or captured, interrogated and executed by the Gestapo.

In February 1943, a team of Norwegian commandos of SOE's Norwegian Independent Company 1 (Kompani Linge) destroyed the production facility in Operation Gunnerside; this was followed by Allied bombing raids. The Germans ceased operations, and attempted to move the remaining heavy water to Germany. Norwegian resistance forces then sank the ferry carrying the heavy water, the SF Hydro, on Lake Tinn.

== Background ==
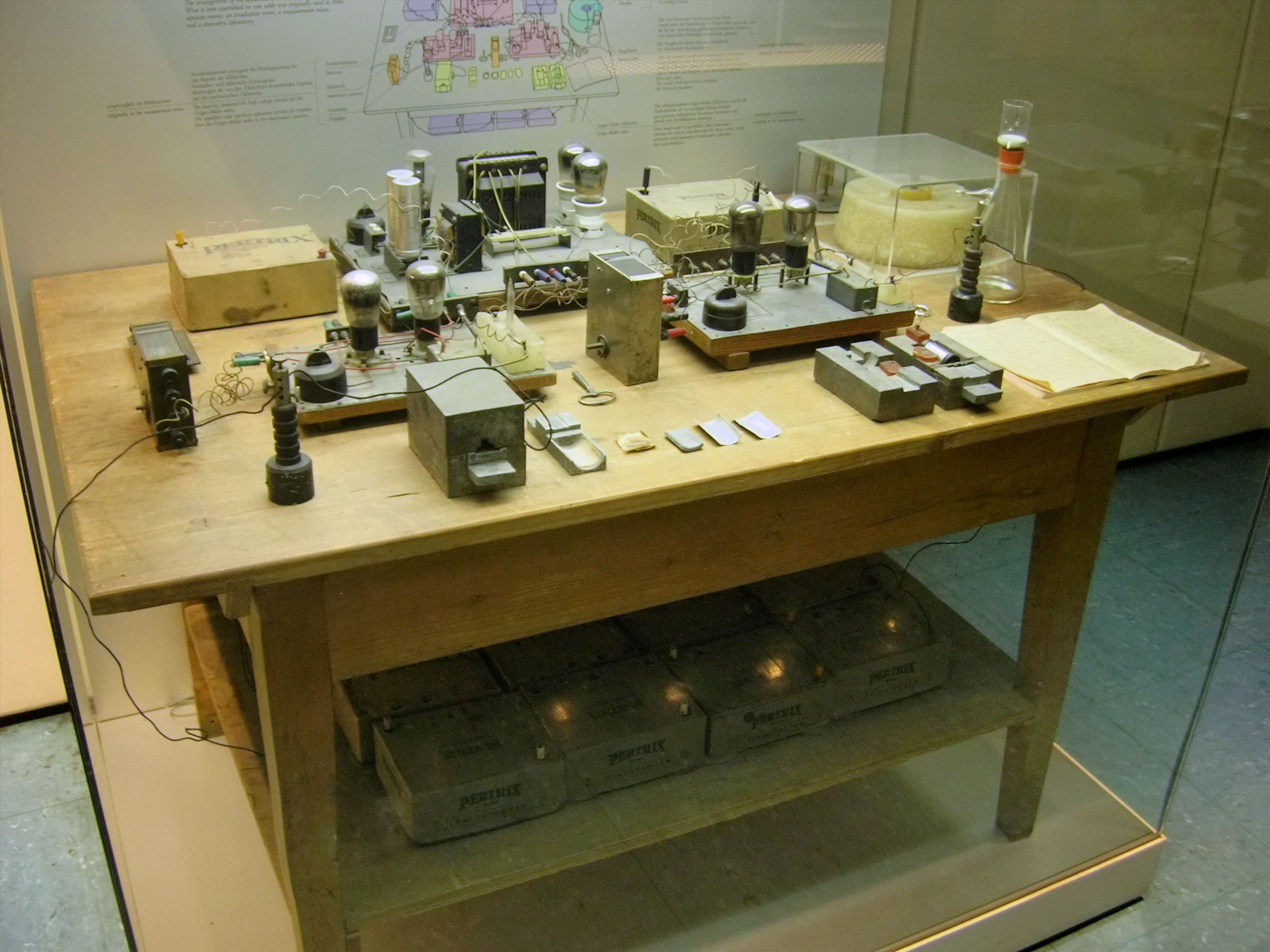
Experimental apparatus with which chemists Otto Hahn and Fritz Strassmann discovered the nuclear fission of uranium in 1938

Enrico Fermi and his colleagues studied the results of bombarding uranium with neutrons in 1934. That year, Ida Noddack first mentioned the concept of nuclear fission. In December 1938, four years after the Fermi publication, Lise Meitner and Otto Robert Frisch correctly interpreted Otto Hahn and Fritz Strassmann's radiochemical experimental results as evidence of nuclear fission.

News of the discovery spread quickly among physicists and it was realized that if chain reactions could be controlled, fission might be a new source of great power. What was needed was a substance which could moderate the energy of the secondary neutrons emitted by fission, so they could be captured by other fissile nuclei. Heavy water and graphite were the prime candidates for moderating neutron energy.

When Nazi Germany investigated the production of an atomic bomb, a range of options was identified. Although historical records provide limited detail on the German decision to pursue the heavy water approach, it became clear after the war that they had explored that option. Although ultimately unsuccessful, the approach chosen has been demonstrated as technically viable. Plutonium-239 (^{239}Pu) makes effective weapons material, although it requires an implosion-type mechanism rather than the simpler gun-type trigger used in the Thin Man uranium bomb. Heavy water has been demonstrated as an effective moderator for ^{239}Pu production, and may be separated from ordinary water by electrolysis. The German program had already been handicapped by the Nazi purging of German Jewish physicists and the conscription of others and ended in the autumn of 1942.

=== Approaches to developing a weapon ===
In nuclear-weapon development, the main problem is securing sufficient weapons-grade material; it is particularly difficult to acquire fissile isotopes of uranium-235 (^{235}U) or ^{239}Pu. Weapons-grade uranium requires mining, extracting and enriching natural ore. Plutonium can be "bred" in reactors fueled by unenriched uranium, which requires chemical separation of the ^{239}Pu produced.

=== Plutonium production ===
Although the most common isotope of uranium, uranium-238 (^{238}U), can be used as secondary fissionable material in hydrogen (fusion) bombs, it cannot be used as the primary fissile material for an atomic (fission-only) bomb. ^{238}U can be used to produce ^{239}Pu through the fission of ^{235}U, which produces neutrons (some of which will be absorbed by ^{238}U, creating ^{239}U). The ^{239}U will decay after a few days, turning into weapons-usable ^{239}Pu.

The Germans found that a chain reaction could not be sustained if graphite was used as a moderator, and abandoned it. Unaware that this was due to impurities, they did not test ultra-pure graphite (which would have been suitable). Instead, they settled on a heavy-water-based reactor design. A heavy-water-moderated nuclear reactor could be used for nuclear-fission research and, ultimately, to breed the plutonium with which a bomb could be made.

=== Deuterium ("heavy water") production ===
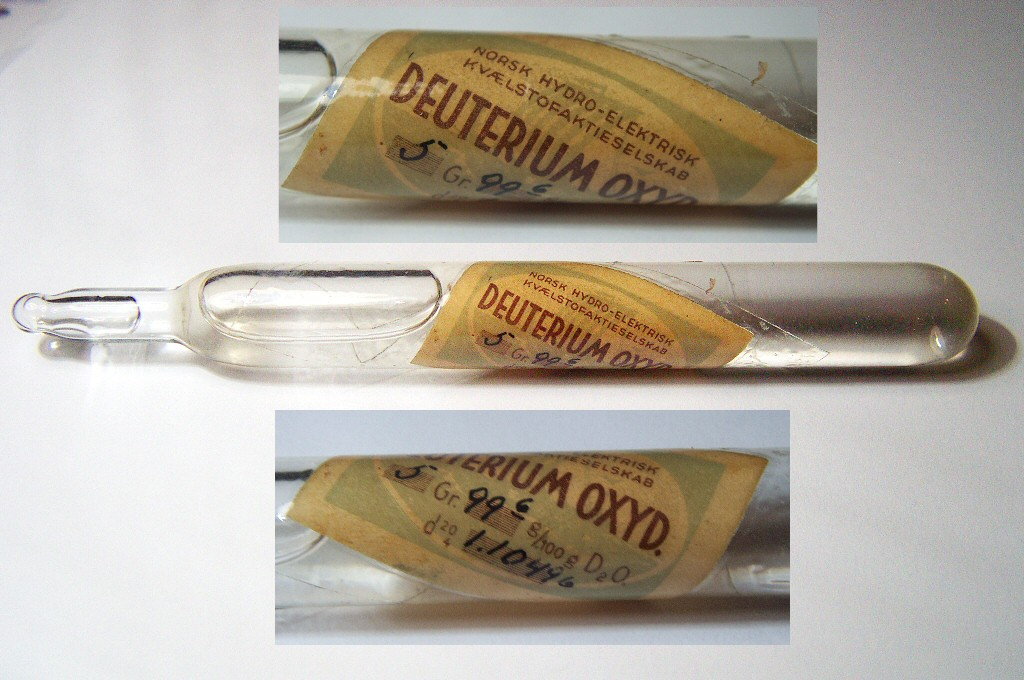
Heavy water made by Norsk Hydro

In normal water, there is only one deuterium atom for every 6,400 hydrogen atoms; deuterium is more prevalent in the residue of water used as an electrolyte. An analysis of residues from the Vemork hydroelectric plant, a large-scale nitrate production plant using the Haber process, showed a hydrogen-to-deuterium ratio of 48 (most of the deuterium bound in HDO molecules). Norwegian Institute of Technology lecturer Leif Tronstad and Jomar Brun, head of the hydrogen plant, proposed a project in 1933 (the year heavy water was first isolated). It was accepted by Norsk Hydro, and production began in 1935.

The technology is straightforward. Heavy water (D_{2}O) is separated from normal water by electrolysis, because the difference in mass between the two hydrogen isotopes translates into a slight difference in the speed at which the reaction proceeds. To produce pure heavy water by electrolysis requires a large cascade of electrolysis chambers, and consumes large amounts of electric power. Since excess power was available, heavy water could be purified from the existing electrolyte. Norsk Hydro became the heavy-water supplier for the world's scientific community, as a by-product of fertilizer production for which the ammonia was used. Hans Suess, a German adviser on the production of heavy water, had assessed the Vemork plant as incapable of producing militarily-useful quantities of heavy water in less than five years at its capacity at the time.

== Operations to limit German access to heavy water ==
=== Pre-invasion efforts ===
French research considered the production of ^{239}Pu using reactors moderated by heavy water and graphite. Preliminary French research indicated that the graphite then available commercially was not pure enough to serve the purpose, and heavy water would be required. The German research community had reached a similar conclusion, and had procured additional heavy water from Vemork in January 1940. The German firm IG Farben, a partial owner of Norsk Hydro, had ordered 100 kg (220 lb) per month; Norsk Hydro's maximum production rate was then limited to 10 kg (22 lb) per month.

The Deuxième Bureau (French military intelligence) directed three French agents (Captain Muller and Lieutenants Mossé and Knall-Demars) to remove the world's extant supply, 185 kg (408 lb), of heavy water from the Vemork plant in then-neutral Norway in 1940. Norsk Hydro general director Axel Aubert agreed to lend the heavy water to France for the duration of the war, noting that if Germany won the war he would probably be shot. Transportation was difficult, since the Abwehr (German military intelligence) was present in Norway and had been alerted of ongoing French activities in Norway (although they were not specifically warned about heavy water). If they had become aware of the shipment, they might have tried to intercept it. The French transported it secretly to Oslo, then to Perth, Scotland, and finally to France.

When France was invaded, French nuclear scientist Frédéric Joliot-Curie took charge of the material and hid it in a Banque de France vault and then in a prison. Joliot-Curie moved it to Bordeaux, where it, research papers and most of the scientists (Joliot-Curie remained in France) boarded the British tramp steamer Broompark (one of the many merchant ships involved in saving over 200,000 troops and civilians in the three weeks after the Dunkirk evacuation).

The ship already had industrial diamonds, machinery and British evacuees aboard. The Broompark delivered its passengers and cargo, including the global stockpile of heavy water, to Falmouth, Cornwall on 21 June. The award of an OBE to Captain Paulsen was recorded in The London Gazette of 4 February 1941. Crucial to the success of the mission was the role played by Charles Howard, 20th Earl of Suffolk, the British liaison to the French scientific establishment.

Although the supply of heavy water had been removed, the plant was capable of producing more. The Norsk Hydro management's collaboration with the Germans was examined during investigations of collaborationism begun by Norwegian authorities after the war, but Aubert's cooperation with the French aided the company's case.

=== Operations Grouse and Freshman ===
In October 1942, Combined Operations Headquarters began operations to destroy the Vemork plant. There were two operations; the first (Operation Grouse) would drop a number of Norwegians in the area as an advance force. When they were in place, a party of British engineers would be landed by military glider to attack the plant itself (Operation Freshman).

On 18 October 1942, a four-man team of Norwegian commandos of SOE's Kompani Linge parachuted into Norway. Since they had to ski a long distance to the plant from their drop point in the wilderness, considerable time was allotted for Operation Grouse. Unlike previous failed plans, Grouse required the team to memorize blueprints.

The British were suspicious, because the Norwegian Grouse team were delayed in contacting SOE team; the Norwegians had been dropped at the wrong place, however, and had gone off course several times. The secret question was, "What did you see in the early morning of (a day)?" The Grouse team replied, "Three pink elephants." The British were ecstatic at the success of Grouse, and the next phase of the operations began.

On 19 November 1942, Operation Freshman followed with a planned glider-borne landing on the frozen lake Møsvatn near the plant. Two Airspeed Horsa gliders, towed by Handley Page Halifax bombers (each glider carrying two pilots and 15 Royal Engineers of the 9th Field Company, 1st British Airborne Division), took off from RAF Skitten near Wick, Caithness, Scotland. The towing of gliders, always hazardous, was worse in this case because of the long flight distance to Norway and poor visibility.

One of the Halifax tugs crashed into a mountain, killing all seven aboard; its glider cast off but crashed nearby, resulting in several casualties. Although the other Halifax arrived at the vicinity of the landing zone, the zone could not be precisely identified because the link between the Eureka (ground) and Rebecca (aircraft) radar beacons failed.

After many tries and with fuel running low, the Halifax pilot decided to abort the operation and return to base. Shortly afterward, the tug and glider experienced heavy turbulence and the tow rope broke. The glider crash-landed near the crash site of the other glider, killing and injuring several more people. The Norwegians were unable to reach the crash sites in time; the survivors were captured by the Gestapo, who tortured and later had them executed under Adolf Hitler's Commando Order.

The unsuccessful raid alerted the Germans to Allied interest in their heavy-water production. The surviving Norwegian Grouse team had a long wait in their mountain hideaway, subsisting on moss and lichen until they captured a reindeer just before Christmas.

=== Operation Gunnerside ===
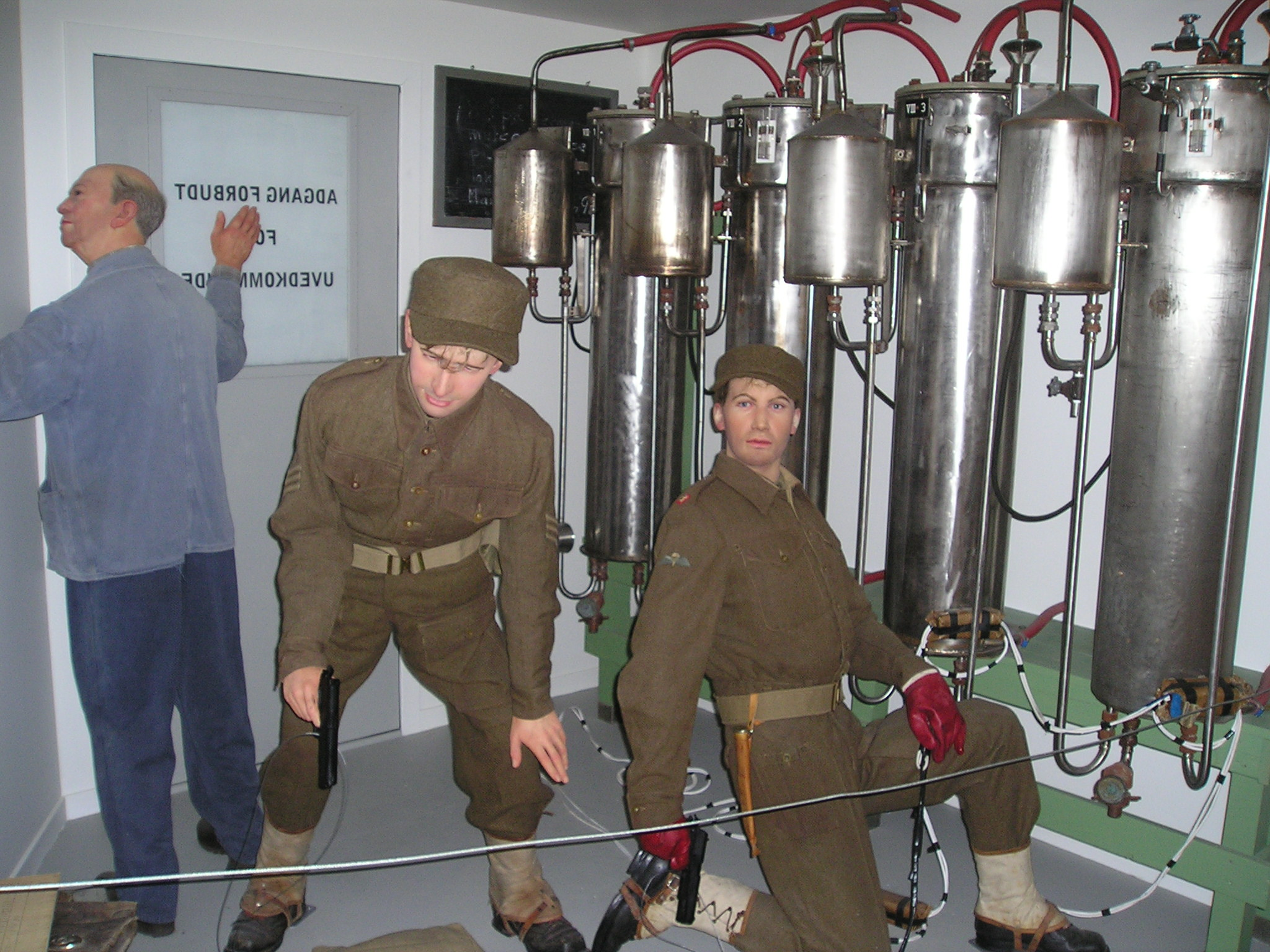
Reconstruction of the Operation Gunnerside team planting explosives to destroy the cascade of electrolysis chambers

British authorities, aware that the Grouse team was still operational, decided to mount another operation with them; by this time, the Grouse team was known as Swallow. On the night of 16 February 1943, in Operation Gunnerside (named after the village of Gunnerside, where SOE head Charles Jocelyn Hambro and his family used to shoot grouse), an additional six Norwegian commandos were dropped by parachute by a 138 Squadron Halifax bomber from RAF Tempsford. They landed successfully, and found the Swallow team after a few days of searching on cross-country skis. The combined team made final preparations for their assault, scheduled for the night of 27–28 February 1943.

Supplies required by the commandos were dropped with them in special CLE containers. One container was buried in the snow by a Norwegian patriot to hide it from the Germans; he later recovered it, and gave it to an officer of the British Army Air Corps (which was conducting exercises in the area) in August 1976. The container was brought back to England and displayed at the Airborne Museum at Aldershot, which became part of the Imperial War Museum Duxford.

After the failed Freshman attempt, the Germans placed mines, floodlights, and additional guards surrounding the plant. Although the mines and lights remained in place, security at the plant had weakened over the winter. The 75 m (246 ft) bridge spanning the deep ravine 200 m (660 ft) above the river Måna, however, was fully guarded.

The force decided to descend into the ravine, travel across the icy river and climb the steep hill on the far side. The winter river level was very low, and on the far side (where the ground leveled) they followed a single railway track straight into the plant without encountering any guards. Even before Grouse landed in Norway, SOE had a Norwegian agent in the plant who supplied detailed plans and schedules. The demolition party used this information to enter the main basement by a cable tunnel and through a window. The only person they encountered in the plant was a Norwegian caretaker named Johansen, who was very willing to cooperate with them.

The saboteurs then placed explosive charges on the heavy-water electrolysis chambers, and attached a fuse which allowed sufficient time for their escape. In an attempt to prevent reprisals, a Thompson submachine gun was purposely left behind to indicate that this was the work of British forces and not the local resistance. When the fuses were about to be lit, the caretaker was worried about his glasses (which were somewhere in the room; during the war, new eyeglasses were nearly impossible to obtain). A frantic search ensued; the glasses were found, showing a bit of care from the Norwegian group, and the fuses lit. The explosive charges detonated, destroying the electrolysis chambers.

The raid was considered successful. The entire inventory of heavy water produced during the German occupation, over 500 kg (1,102 lb), was destroyed with equipment critical to the operation of the electrolysis chambers. Although 3,000 German soldiers were dispatched to search the area for the commandos, all escaped; five commandos escaped by skiing 322 km (200 mi) to Sweden, two proceeded to Oslo (where they assisted Milorg), and four remained in the region for further resistance work.

=== Resumed operation and Allied air raids ===
The attack halted production for several months, although it did not permanently damage the Vemork plant. The plant was repaired by April; SOE concluded that a repeat commando raid would be extremely difficult, since German security was considerably improved.

Almost as soon as production resumed, the USAAF began a series of raids on Vemork. The plant was attacked in November by a massive daylight bombing raid of 143 B-17 heavy bombers, which dropped 711 bombs. Although the raid caused extensive damage, at least 600 bombs missed the plant.

On 16 and 18 November, 35 B-24 heavy bombers from the 392nd Bomber Group (based at Wendling, Station 118) extensively attacked the hydro-electric power station at Rjukan. The missions, the bomber group's longest, lasted 9 1/2 and 10 1/2 hours respectively. There was less need for ground assaults than a year earlier, since night bombing (previously unrealistic due to German air cover) was now an alternative. The Germans, convinced that air raids would result in further serious damage, decided to abandon the plant and move its remaining stocks and critical components to Germany in 1944.

=== Sinking of the SF Hydro ===
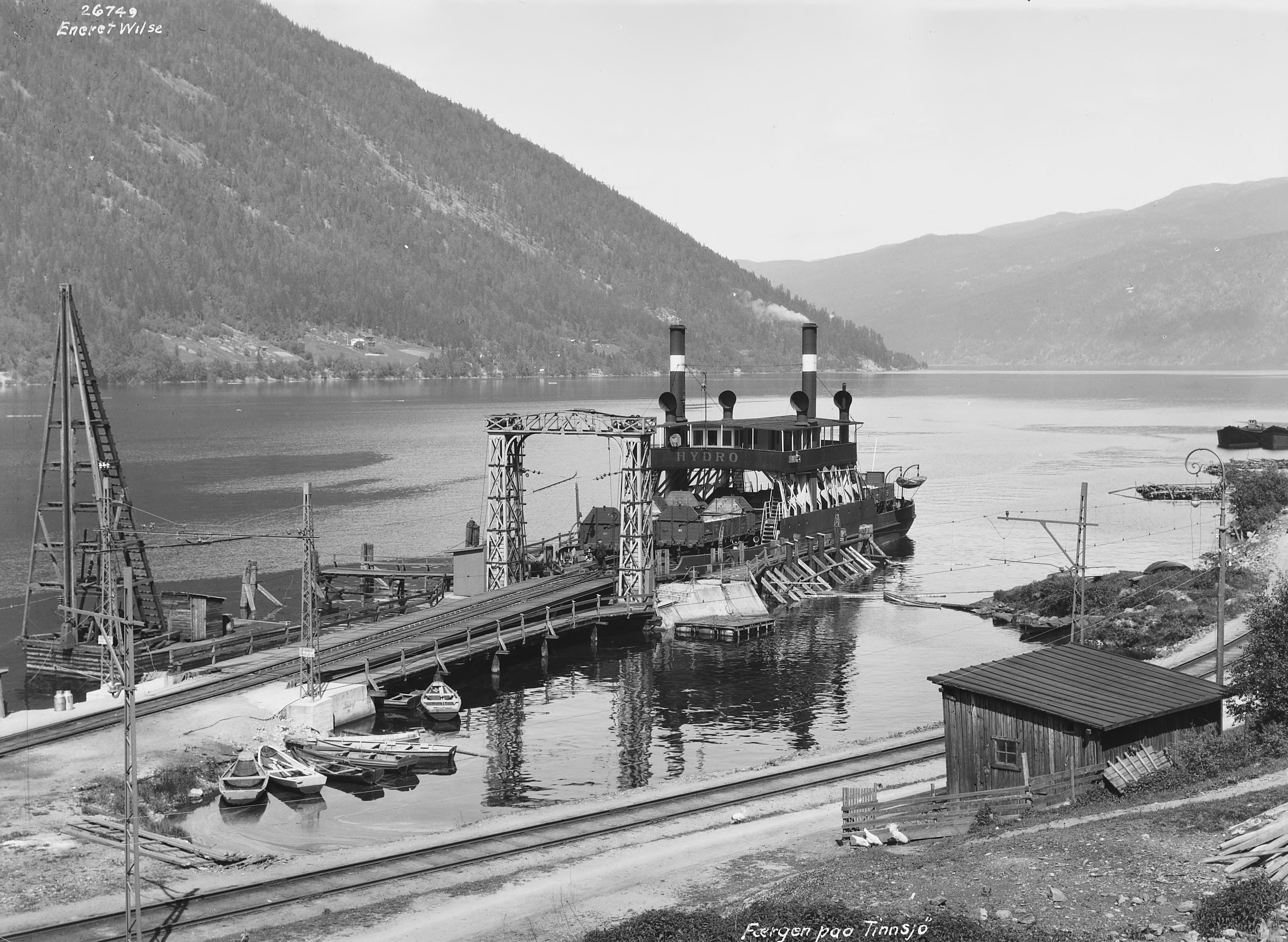
The SF Hydro at Mæl in 1925

Knut Haukelid (the only trained commando in the immediate area) was informed of the German plan to remove the heavy water, and was advised to muster support and destroy the shipment. Haukelid recruited two people, and they decided to sabotage a ferry which would be carrying the heavy water across Lake Tinn on the Tinnsjø railway ferry. One of his recruits recognized a ferry-crew member and spoke with him, taking an opportunity to slip into the bottom of the ship, plant the bomb and slip away. Eight-and-a-half kilograms of plastic explosives (with two alarm-clock fuses) were fixed to the keel of the SF Hydro, which would transport railway cars with drums of the heavy water across Lake Tinn.

The ferry and its cargo sank in deep water shortly after its departure around midnight on 20 February 1944. Witnesses reported seeing steel drums floating after the ferry sank, leading to speculation that they did not really contain heavy water; an examination of records after the war showed that some barrels were only half-full, however, and would have floated. A few may have been salvaged and transported to Germany.

Despite the mission's intention to minimize casualties, 18 people were killed; 29 survived. The dead were 14 Norwegian crew and passengers and four German soldiers.

A 2005 expedition retrieved a barrel, numbered "26", from the bottom of the lake. Its heavy-water contents matched the concentration noted in German records, confirming that the shipment was not a decoy. The concentration of heavy water in some of the barrels was too small to be of value to a weapons program, however, which might explain the lack of tight security around the shipment and why the ferry was not searched for bombs.

== Historical perspective ==
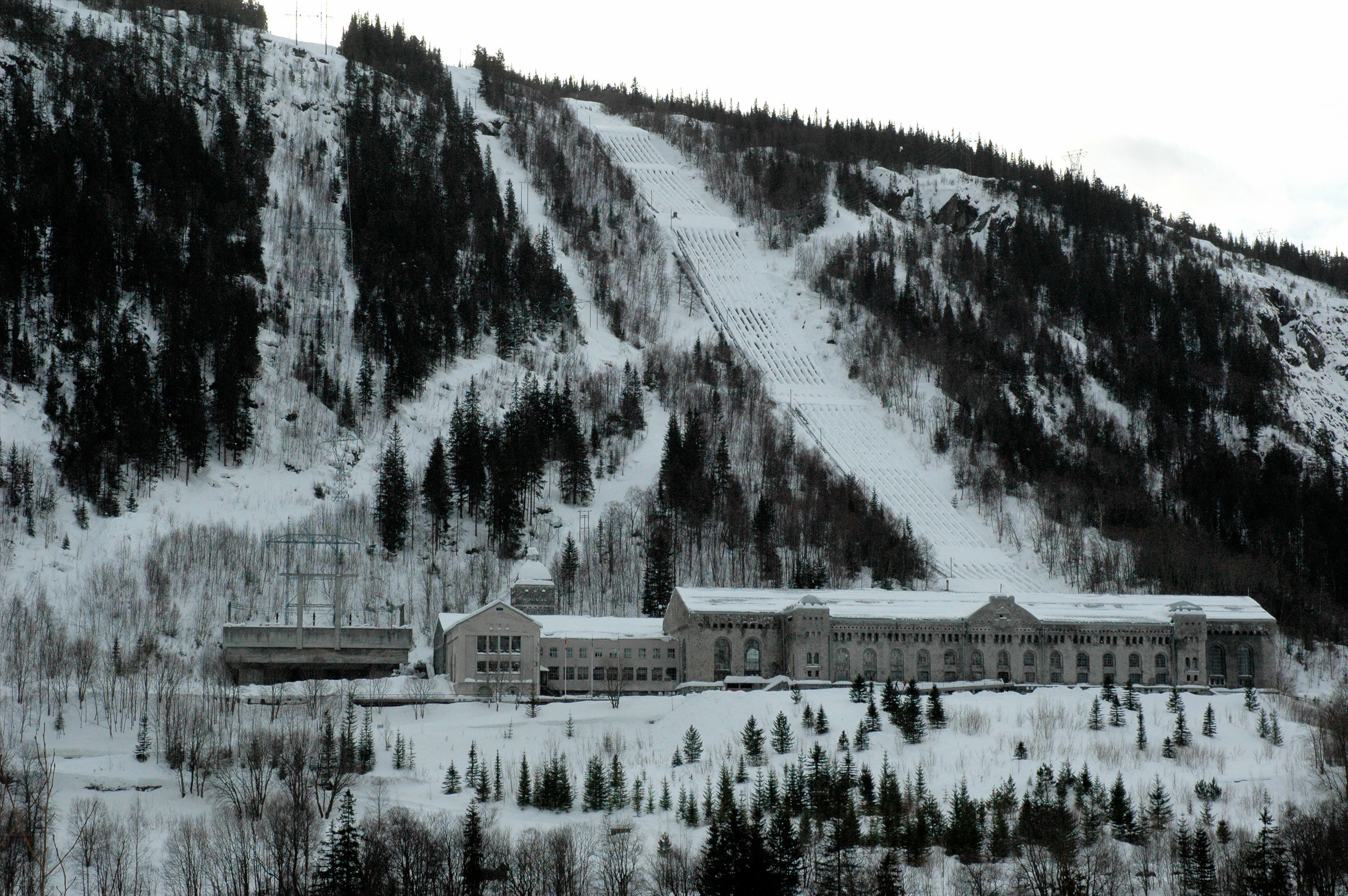
The plant in 2008

Recent investigation of production records at Norsk Hydro and analysis of an intact barrel which was salvaged in 2004 indicated that although the barrels in this shipment contained pH 14 water (suggestive of the alkaline electrolytic-refinement process), they did not contain high concentrations of D_{2}O. Despite the apparent shipment size, the total quantity of pure heavy water was limited; most barrels contained only 0.5–1.0 percent heavy water, confirming the success of Operation Gunnerside in destroying higher-purity heavy water.

The Germans would have needed a total of about 5 t (5.5 short tons) of heavy water to operate a nuclear reactor, and the manifest indicated that there was only 500 kg (0.55 short tons) of heavy water being transported to Germany. The Hydro was carrying too little heavy water to supply one reactor, let alone the 10 or more tons of heavy water needed to make enough plutonium for a nuclear weapon.

The historical consensus about the German nuclear weapons program is that it was a long way from producing a bomb, even if the Norwegian heavy water had been produced and shipped at the maximum rate. However, the unsuccessful Operation Freshman and the efforts of the saboteurs in Swallow, Grouse and Gunnerside made the secret war on heavy-water production internationally known.

== Agents ==
Joachim Rønneberg, the last surviving member of the Gunnerside team, died on 21 October 2018 at age 99. A statue of him, along with a plaque commemorating Operation Gunnerside, stands near the harbour in his hometown of Ålesund. The New York Times reported that at 95, Rønneberg was "still mentally sharp ... and possessed of the unflappable calm that so impressed British military commanders more than 70 years ago." Einar Skinnarland was the first agent inside.

Grouse-Swallow team
Jens-Anton Poulsson
Arne Kjelstrup
Knut Haugland
Claus Helberg

Gunnerside team
Joachim Rønneberg
Knut Haukelid
Fredrik Kayser
Kasper Idland
Hans Storhaug
Birger Strømsheim
Leif Tronstad

Lake Tinn team
Knut Haukelid
Knut Lier-Hansen
Rolf Sørlie
Einar Skinnarland
Gunnar Syverstad
Kjell Nielsen
"Larsen"

== Histories ==
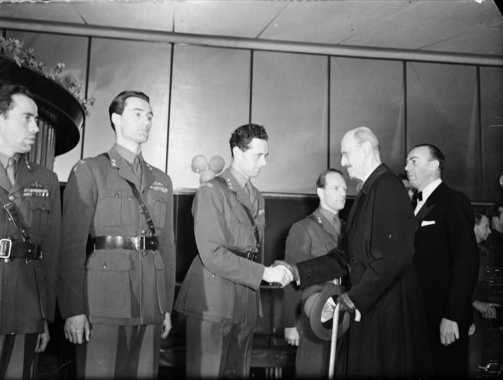
Première of Operation Swallow: The Battle for Heavy Water (Kampen om tungtvannet) on 5 February 1948 (from left) Knut Haukelid, Joachim Rønneberg, Jens-Anton Poulsson (shaking hands with King Haakon VII), and Kasper Idland

After interviewing Nielsen and Helberg, Barbara Wace of the Associated Press filed a news article on the sabotage in May 1945. Wartime censorship delayed publication until after the atomic bombings of Hiroshima and Nagasaki in August 1945. But For These Men (ISBN 0705700453), a 1962 book by John D. Drummond, recounts two dramatic raids: on the Norsk Hydro heavy-water factory at Vemork and another on the railway ferry Hydro. The Real Heroes of Telemark: The True Story of the Secret Mission to Stop Hitler's Atomic Bomb, a 2003 book by Ray Mears (ISBN 0-340-83016-6), emphasises the Norwegian commandos' unique survival skills. The book is a companion volume to The Real Heroes of Telemark, a BBC television documentary series.

Skis Against the Atom (ISBN 0-942323-07-6) is a first-hand account by Knut Haukelid, one of the Gunnerside raiders who remained behind. Jens-Anton Poulsson (Swallow and Grouse) wrote The Heavy Water Raid: The Race for the Atom Bomb 1942–1944 (ISBN 9788245808698), a 2009 book. Operation Freshman is covered in two books: Richard Wiggan's 1986 Operation Freshman: The Rjukan Heavy Water Raid 1942 (ISBN 9780718305710) and Jostein Berglyd's 2007 Operation Freshman: The Actions and the Aftermath (ISBN 9789197589598).

Richard Rhodes's Pulitzer Prize-winning book, The Making of the Atomic Bomb, includes details of the events. Leo Marks' 1998 book, Between Silk and Cyanide: A Codemaker's Story 1941–1945 (ISBN 0-684-86780-X), also details the story. Marks (SOE's cryptographer) knew the Norwegian team, trained them in cryptography so they could communicate with SOE in England, and followed their progress after they were dropped in Norway. The raid is the subject of Assault in Norway: Sabotaging the Nazi Nuclear Program (ISBN 9781585747504), a 2002 book by Thomas Gallagher based on interviews with many of the commandos.

An account of Operation Gunnerside is part of Neal Bascomb's 2016 The Winter Fortress: The Epic Mission to Sabotage Hitler's Atomic Bomb (ISBN 9780544368057). Damien Lewis's book Hunting Hitler's Nukes: The Secret Race to Stop the Nazi Bomb (ISBN 9781786482082), also published that year, details the raid and the sinking of the SF Hydro. The 2018 book, Heroes of Telemark; Sabotaging Hitler's atomic bomb, Norway 1942–44 by David Greentree (ISBN 9781472827678), describes the operation's planning, execution and aftermath.
