= Einar Skinnarland =

Norwegian construction engineer and resistance fighter

Einar Skinnarland DCM
- Born: 27 April 1918; Vinje Municipality, Norway
- Died: 5 December 2002 (aged 84); Toronto, Canada
- Occupation: Engineer
- Known for: Participated in the: Norwegian heavy water sabotage; Operation Sunshine
- Awards: War Cross with sword; Distinguished Conduct Medal; Medal of Freedom; Croix de Guerre avec palme

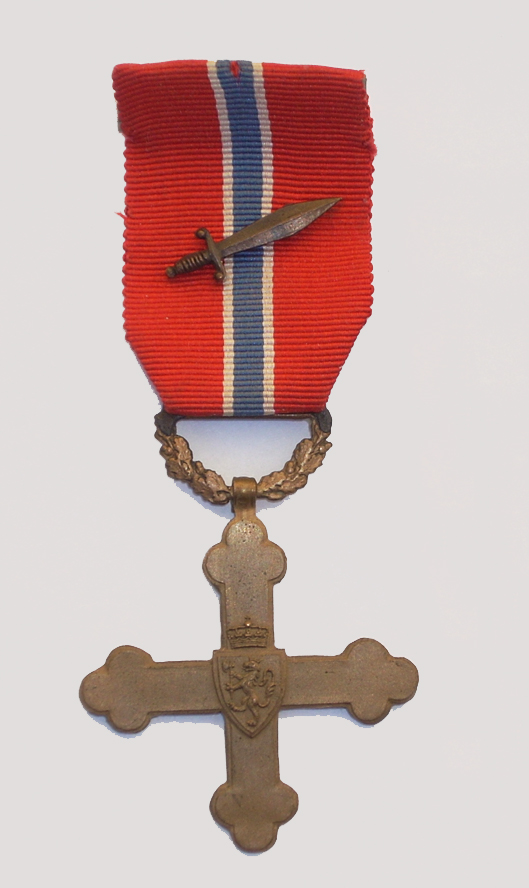
War Cross with sword

Einar Skinnarland DCM (27 April 1918 – 5 December 2002) was a Norwegian resistance fighter during the Second World War.

== Life and career ==
Einar Skinnarland was born in Vinje Municipality in Telemark county, Norway. Skinnarland graduated from Telemark Engineering College in Porsgrunn.

Skinnarland worked at the Norsk Hydro plant at the Vemork hydroelectric plant, and decided to escape to the UK to help the war effort. He reached Aberdeen with the hijacked coastal steamer Galtesund in 1942, and was soon enrolled as a member of the Norwegian Independent Company 1 (Norwegian: Kompani Linge) under the SOE. He participated as a wireless operator in the Norwegian heavy water sabotage at the Vemork hydroelectric plant, site of the heavy water production at Rjukan Falls in Telemark. He was the first agent to be sent to Rjukan, dropped on the Hardangervidda on 28 March 1942. He had lived near the factory almost all of his life. His brothers and several of his friends also worked at the factory.

Skinnarland moved to Toronto in Canada in 1965 and helped build some of the world's largest dams.

== Legacy ==
In the 1948 film Kampen om tungtvannet, his character was played by Henki Kolstad.

== Awards ==
Einar Skinnarland was highly decorated for his wartime achievements.

- War Cross with sword
- Distinguished Conduct Medal
- Medal of Freedom
- Croix de Guerre avec palme
