= Claus Helberg =

Norwegian resistance fighter and mountain guide

Claus Helberg (31 January 1919 – 6 March 2003) was a Norwegian resistance fighter and mountain guide. He was a member of Company Linge, a resistance commando unit that was best known for carrying out Norwegian heavy water sabotage during World War II. After the war, he worked for the Norwegian Mountain Touring Association until his retirement in 1982. While volunteering with the Association after his retirement, he helped guide several members of the Scandinavian royalty. According to The New York Times, "[he was] the favorite mountain guide of Scandinavian royalty..." These clients included Queen Sonja and Margrethe II of Denmark.

== Early life ==
He was born in Rjukan on 31 January 1919. As a child, he spent much time on the mountains around Rjukan. In 1938, he started working for a touring organization that wanted to make the mountains less forbidding for visitors.

== World War II ==
He escaped Norway with 400 other Norwegians in January 1942 and arrived in the United Kingdom. Once there, he started commando training with other Norwegians refugees. Nine months later in October 1942, he parachuted, along with four other Norwegians, into the Rjukan region. Helberg, along with his team code-named "Swallow", were to help guide a British commando team to blow the local power plant Vemork hydroelectric. This plant could have been used to develop heavy water, which could have been used to help Germany develop an atomic bomb. However, the British mission ended in failure. Rather than being pulled out, the team stayed during the winter while a new unit was trained to attack the plant.

After Operation Gunnerside, team Swallow stayed in place to monitor developments within the plant. However, Helberg was found out by a German soldier who doggedly pursued him as he skied away. After skiing for hours, an exchange of shots occurred between Helberg and the soldier; the latter was wounded and Helberg, though exhausted, finally got away from the patrol. Because it had gotten darker, he skied off a cliff and broke his arm. He continued to ski for another twelve miles and avoided yet another patrol of German soldiers near Mogen. After receiving help from Norwegians in Mogen and Rauland, he went to the Germans and was able to convince them that he had broken his arm while working for the Germans searching the Hardanger Plateau for the saboteurs. The soldiers believed his story and took him to the German field doctor, and then on to Dalen. Then he went to a hotel and was able to get a room.

Soon after he arrived, Josef Terboven, commissioner of occupied Norway, arrived at the same hotel and demanded that a local woman have dinner with him. She refused, and Terboven ordered that everyone in the hotel be arrested and sent off to Grini concentration camp for questioning and possible internment. Helberg knew that if he was arrested and his identity as a resistance fighter discovered he would be executed. He jumped out of the bus that was being used to transport everyone from the hotel to the camp. As a result of the jump he re-injured his arm, but was able to escape.

== Honours and awards ==
- Knight 1st Class of the Order of St. Olav (1986)
- St. Olav's Medal With Oak Branch
- King's Medal of Merit in Gold
- Defence Medal 1940–1945 (with rosette)
- King Haakon VII commemorative
- Knight of the Order of the Dannebrog (Denmark)
- Legion of Honour (France)
- Croix de guerre 1939–1945 (France)
- Military Medal (United Kingdom)
- Medal of Freedom with bronze palm (United States)
- October revolution 80th anniversary (Soviet Union, 2000)
