= Vemork =

Hydroelectric power plant in Norway

Coordinates: 59°52′16″N 8°29′29″E

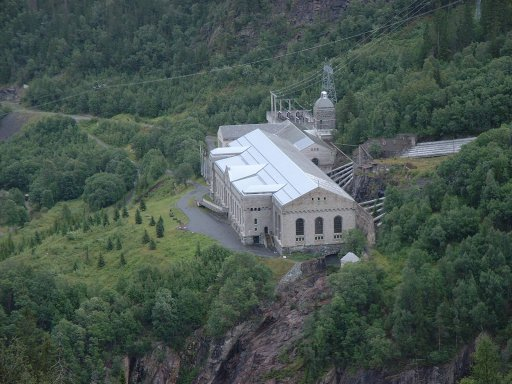
Site of the plant in 2003

Vemork is a hydroelectric power plant and a museum outside the town of Rjukan in Tinn Municipality in Telemark county, Norway. The plant was built by Norsk Hydro and opened in 1911, its main purpose being to fix nitrogen for the production of fertilizer. At opening, it was the world's largest power plant with a capacity of 108 megawatts (145,000 hp).

Vemork was later the site of the first plant in the world to mass-produce heavy water developing from the hydrogen production then used for the Haber process. During World War II, Vemork was the target of Norwegian heavy water sabotage operations. The heavy water plant was closed in 1971, and in 1988 the power station became the Norwegian Industrial Workers Museum.

A new power plant was opened in 1971 and is located inside the mountain behind the old power plant.

In 2026, Vemork was added to the Treasures of European Film Culture list maintained by the European Film Academy. The initiative recognizes locations of symbolic and historical importance to European cinema and promotes their preservation for future generations.

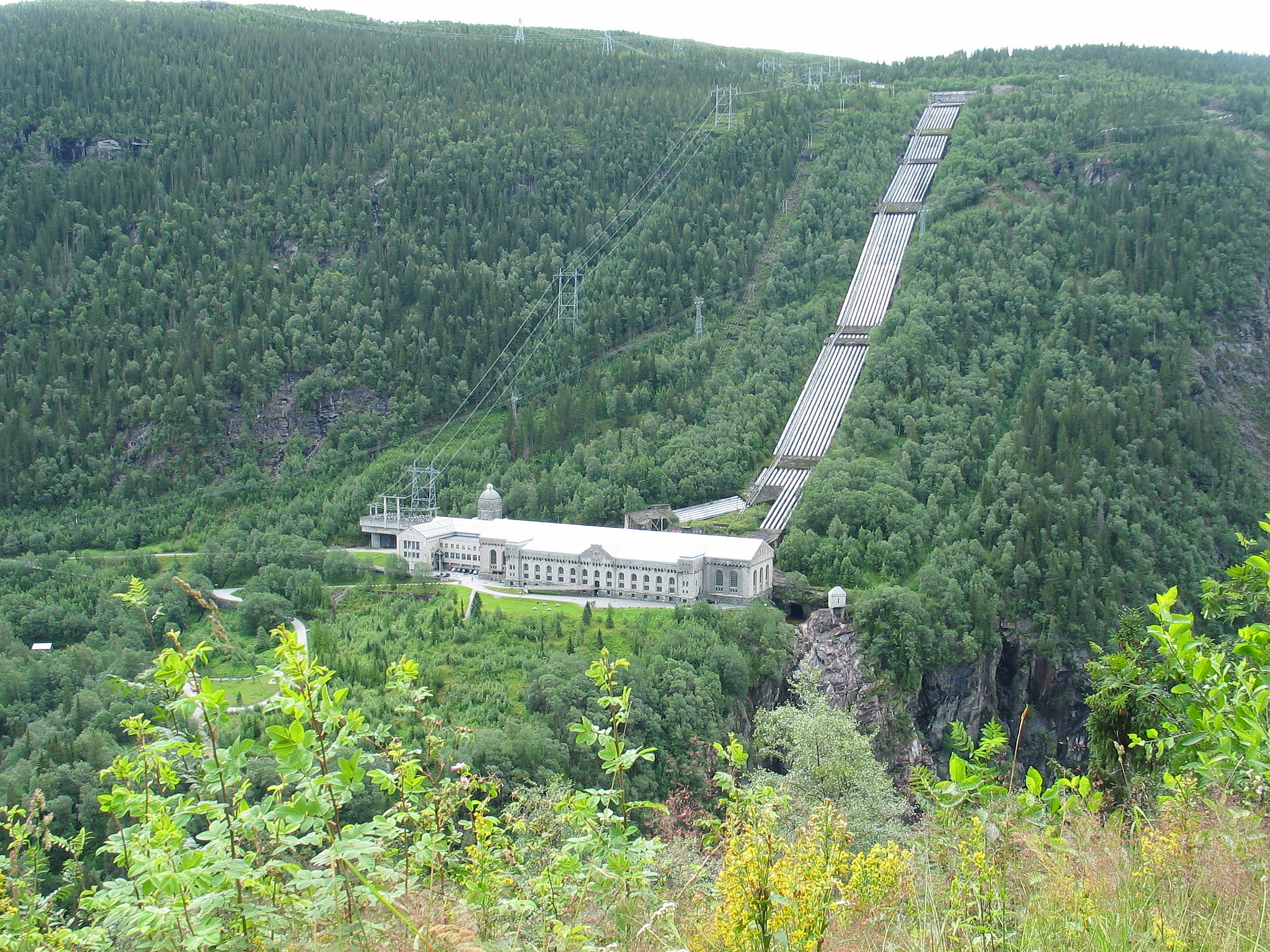
Vemork, Rjukan

== History ==
In 1906, the then newly founded Norsk hydro-elektrisk Kvælstofaktieselskab started construction of what was to be the world's largest hydroelectric power plant. The 108-megawatt (145,000 hp) Vemork power station at the Rjukan Falls was the world's largest power plant when it opened in 1911, after four years of construction. The project was so expensive that the works had to be financed by overseas sources. The plant became the corporate precursor to Norsk Hydro. Ten 6-megawatt (8,000 hp) T/G sets were supplied by Voith and AEG (units 1–5) and Escher Wyss and Oerlikon (units 6–10).

In 1911, construction was complete. The plant itself, was built to power a factory producing artificial fertilizer by a new method invented by Kristian Birkeland. Later, Norsk Hydro developed and realized another project: the production of heavy water by means of electrolysis. The company built a unit for producing high concentrations of heavy water at the Vemork plant at Rjukan, although for what purpose was not stated. Production started in December 1934.

=== Heavy water sabotage ===
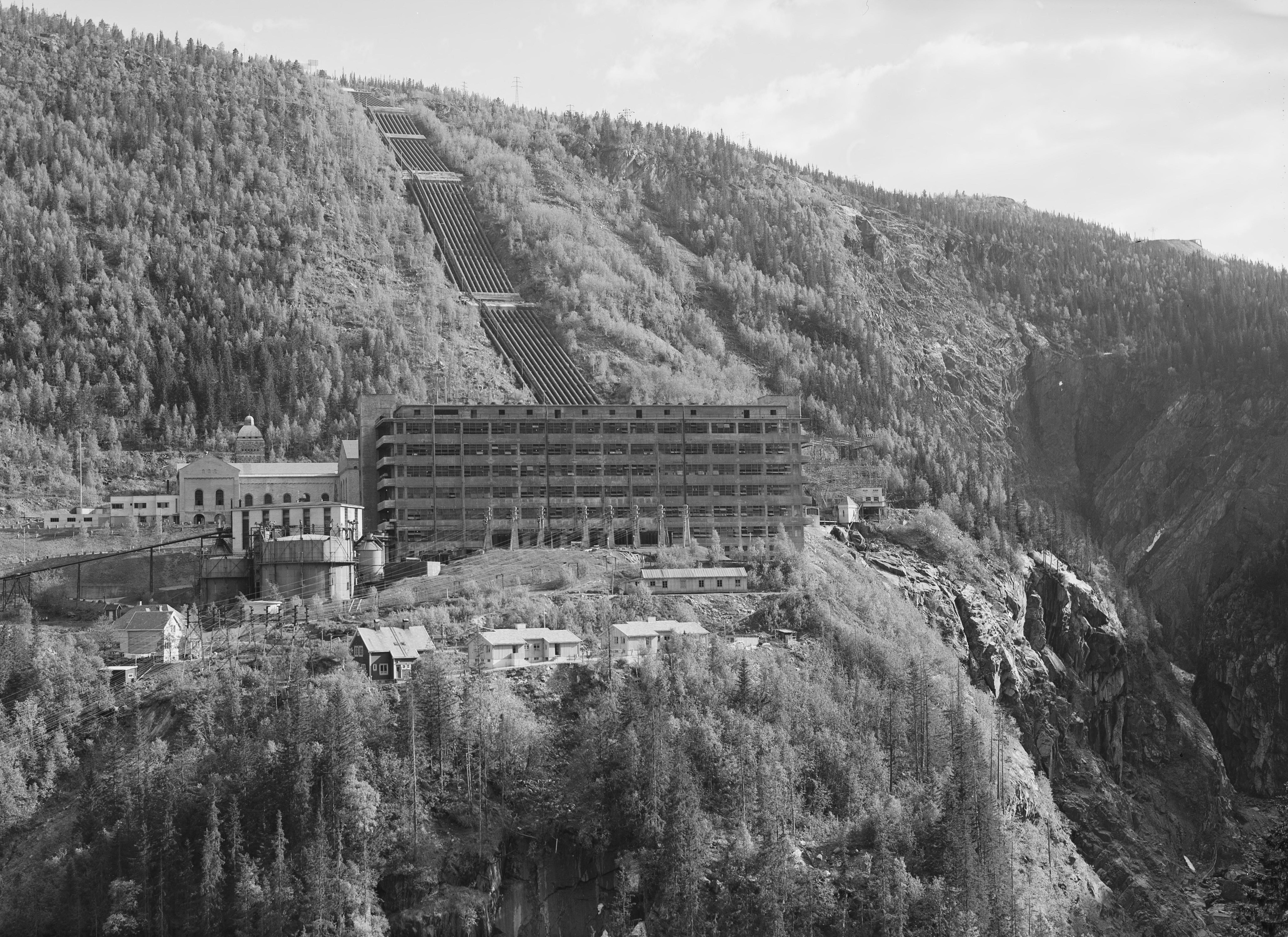
The plant in 1947 or 1948. The heavy water was produced in the front building, the Hydrogen Production Plant.

In 1940, the French Government purchased the entire stock, then available, of heavy water from Norway. The Germans had also offered to purchase it, but the Norwegian Government was told of its possible military use and gave it to a French agent, who smuggled it to France via England. That supply eventually went back to England. (see Tube Alloys#Paris Group)

During the German occupation of Norway in World War II, the production of heavy water was judged to be a serious enough threat that at least five separate attacks were launched in order to prevent the Germans from making an atomic bomb.

- On 18 October 1942, four Norwegian SOE (Special Operations Executive) agents were parachuted in on a reconnaissance operation code-named 'Grouse'.
- On 19 November 1942, Operation Freshman was conducted by the British as a Combined Operation involving the RAF and the Army, using two Halifax bombers, each towing a glider. Three of these aircraft crashed, and the survivors were captured and executed by the Germans.
- In February 1943, SOE's Operation 'Gunnerside' parachuted another six Norwegian agents into the area, to join forces with the four from 'Grouse'. They successfully attacked the Rjukan electrolysis plant on the night of 28 February-1 March 1943, with the loss of 500 kg of heavy water and destruction of the heavy-water section of the plant.
- On 16 November 1943, an American air raid took place, but there was minimal damage to the electrolysis building.
- On 20 February 1944, a successful attack by Norwegian resistance sank the ferry "D/F Hydro" that was taking a shipment of heavy water to Germany.

It was later discovered that the Germans were not as close to making an atomic bomb as had been initially feared.

Today, the original power plant is an industrial museum. Its exhibitions cover both the heavy-water sabotage operations and the early Norwegian labor movement.

== Other media ==
A Norwegian movie about the sabotage operation against the heavy water power plant was made in 1948, starring several of the original saboteurs, titled Operation Swallow: The Battle for Heavy Water (USA).

In 1954, a non-fiction account of the operation by one of its operatives, Knut Haukelid, Skis Against the Atom, was published by Willian Kimber, later revised by Fontana Books in 1973, and then by North American Heritage Press in 1989.

In 1965, director Anthony Mann made a rather less accurate film version of the story entitled The Heroes of Telemark, starring Kirk Douglas and Richard Harris.

In 1975, a non-fiction book by Thomas Gallagher called Assault in Norway was published by Harcourt Brace Jovanovich. The book's cover states that the book is "the true story of the secret mission that blasted Hitler's dream of an atomic bomb."

Swedish metal band Sabaton put the song "Saboteurs" on the Coat Of Arms album in 2010 which tells the story of the Operation Gunnerside saboteurs.

In 2003, British survival expert Ray Mears made a BBC documentary series and book called The Real Heroes of Telemark giving a more realistic view of the difficulties encountered in the mission to sabotage the heavy-water power plant.

In 2015, Håkon Anton Fagerås made a statue in bronze of Joachim Rønneberg on commission. It was unveiled by Princess Astrid in Ålesund.

In May 2016, a book by Neal Bascomb, The Winter Fortress: The Epic Mission to Sabotage Hitler's Atomic Bomb, was published by Houghton Mifflin Harcourt. Bascomb also wrote a young adult book, Sabotage: The Mission to Destroy Hitler's Atomic Bomb, published May 2016 by Arthur A. Levine Books.
