= Number 24 (film) =

2024 Norwegian film

- Directed by: John Andreas Andersen
- Story by: Erlend Loe; Espen von Ibenfeldt
- Produced by: Terje Strømstad; John M. Jacobsen
- Starring: Sjur Vatne Brean; Erik Hivju; Philip Helgar; Magnus Dugdale; Lisa Loven Kongsli; Benjamin Myhre
- Music by: Kristoffer Lo
- Release date: 30 October 2024
- Running time: 112 minutes
- Country: Norway
- Language: Norwegian

Number 24, also spelled Nr 24, is a 2024 Norwegian biographical feature film about the Norwegian resistance fighter Gunnar Sønsteby during World War II. The film is directed by John Andreas Andersen and produced by Motion Blur. It premiered in Norway on 30 October 2024.

== Plot ==
The film follows Sønsteby from the campaign in 1940 and throughout World War II. It dramatizes several of the Oslo Group's sabotage operations and assassinations during World War II, and is framed by an elderly Sønsteby giving a lecture to school students in Rjukan, where he recounts the events he participated in during the war.

"I have five drawers in my mind. The three top drawers, I open all the time. The fourth, less often. I closed the bottom drawer 8 May 1945 and haven't opened it since."

— Gunnar Sønsteby, 1918–2012, Film opening statement

When he was 94, Gunnar took a taxi to Diakonhjemmet in Oslo and laid down in a bed. He had done what he set out to do. Norway's Home Front Museum has a copy of the letter Erling Solheim sent Stapo. Gunnar Sønsteby always made it clear that other members of the Solheim family were anti-Nazi and known to be "good Norwegians".

— Film closing statement

== Cast ==
- Sjur Vatne Brean as Gunnar Sønsteby (young)
  - Erik Hivju as Gunnar Sønsteby (old)
- Philip Helgar as Edvard Tallaksen
- Magnus Dugdale as Andreas Aubert
- Jakob Maanum Trulsen as Karl Erling Øhrn Solheim
- Jacob Jensen as Jens Christian Hauge
- Flo Fagerli as Anne Solheim
- Ines Høysæter Asserson as Reidun Andersen
- Lisa Loven Kongsli as Gudrun Collett
- Martin Karelius Østensen as Philip Hansteen
- August Wittgenstein as Siegfried Fehmer
- Per Kjerstad as Karl Marthinsen
- Jørgen Cleve Broch as Knut Haugland
- Ulrik William Græsli as Gregers Gram
- Benjamin Myhre as Max Manus
- Cato Skimten Storengen as Petter Ringen Johannessen
- William Gundersen as Arne Gundeid
- Lars Berge as Oscar Beck
- Benjamin Noble as Daniel Ring
- Morten Rudå as Sverre Hornbæch
- Tobias Aksdal as Halvor Rivrud
- Mark Noble as J. S. Wilson
- Erik Madsen as Erwin Karl Morio
- Kristian Halken as Haakon VII
- Petter Width Kristiansen as Olav V
- Pål Christian Eggen as Hans Konrad Andersen

== Production ==
The film was written as an original spec script by first-time writer Espen von Ibenfeldt and later purchased by Motion Blur.

Sjur Vatne Brean plays the lead role as the young Sønsteby during the war. Erik Hivju plays an older version of the war hero late in life.

The title of the film is the same as the most well-known code name used by Gunnar Sønsteby.

== Release ==
Number 24 premiered in Norway on 30 October 2024, with special pre-premieres in Flekkefjord on 22 October, Oslo on 23 October, and Rjukan on 24 October.

It became available on the streaming platform Netflix in 2025, where it was the most-streamed film in Norway during its opening weeks. Number 24 has an approval rating of 100% on Rotten Tomatoes based on 11 reviews.
