= Dick Zeiner-Henriksen =

Norwegian resistance member

Richard Zeiner-Henriksen ( 1 August 1924 – 12 May 2016) was a Norwegian businessperson and resistance member during World War II.

== World War II ==
On 9 April 1940, Nazi Germany invaded and occupied Norway as a part of World War II. Young Zeiner-Henriksen became a member of the Norwegian Independent Company 1 (Norwegian: Kompani Linge). From 1943 to 1944, he co-operated with Max Manus and Oslogjengen and, from 1944 to 1945, he participated in the Special Operations Executive operation GREBE in Dovrefjell and Rondane.

He participated in the May 1944 sabotage of Arbeidstjenesten's offices. He obtained copy of the door key to the address Wergelandsveien 3 (via an imprint in plastilina) together with Roy Nielsen. Nielsen was in charge of the strike towards Wergelandsveien 3, but the mission was called off because there were people present at the office. Zeiner-Henriksen joined Max Manus, Edvard Tallaksen and Gregers Gram to strike the address Kirkeveien 90. Zeiner-Henriksen was placed outside the building, tasked with ringing the doorbell in case of peril. As the three main saboteurs had spent one-and-a-half hours burning Arbeidstjenesten's documents, they heard the doorbell as well as shooting. Four people from Milorg had been placed throughout the area to assist with firepower in case enemies showed up. Three of the four guards (Lars Eriksen, Jon Hatland and Per Stranger-Thorsen) were captured and executed, whereas the fourth guard, Hans-Peter Styren, survived. Tallaksen, Gram and Zeiner-Henriksen escaped on foot and Manus stole a bike from a passer-by. Only Zeiner-Henriksen, Manus and Styren survived World War II. It later became clear that troops showed up because the Nazi collaborator Hans Eng stayed at the same address that day. The sabotage mission was portrayed in the 2008 film Max Manus. Zeiner-Henriksen was decorated with the Norwegian War Medal, the Defence Medal 1940–1945 and the British King's Medal for Courage in the Cause of Freedom.

Zeiner-Henriksen, born in Leningrad, took his examen artium in 1943. He was a son of the diplomat Richard Zeiner-Henriksen and his wife Erica, née Wang. He was a nephew of the professor of medicine Knut Benjamin Zeiner-Henriksen. His brother, Erik Zeiner-Henriksen, was also a resistance member during the war, but was captured in May 1944 and died in Dachau concentration camp in February 1945.

== Post-war life ==
After the war, he took his education in business administration at the University of Pennsylvania. He graduated in 1948. After further studies in France and England he spent his professional life as a manager. He started his career in the family business in 1950, and went on to the Norwegian Engineering Export Organization in 1960. He was CFO in Kontorautomasjon from 1966 to 1970 and Singer Business Machines from 1970 to 1972 before being promoted to vice-president. In 1975, he was hired as CFO in Norges Varemesse, where he worked to 1990. He was also active in Lingeklubben, an association for former Norwegian Independent Company 1 personnel. The association had 463 members in its heyday, but as many died from old age, it was decided to discontinue the organisation in 2007, when the membership was 63. Zeiner-Henriksen lives in Oslo.
