= Gunnar Sønsteby =

Norwegian resistance fighter (1918–2012)

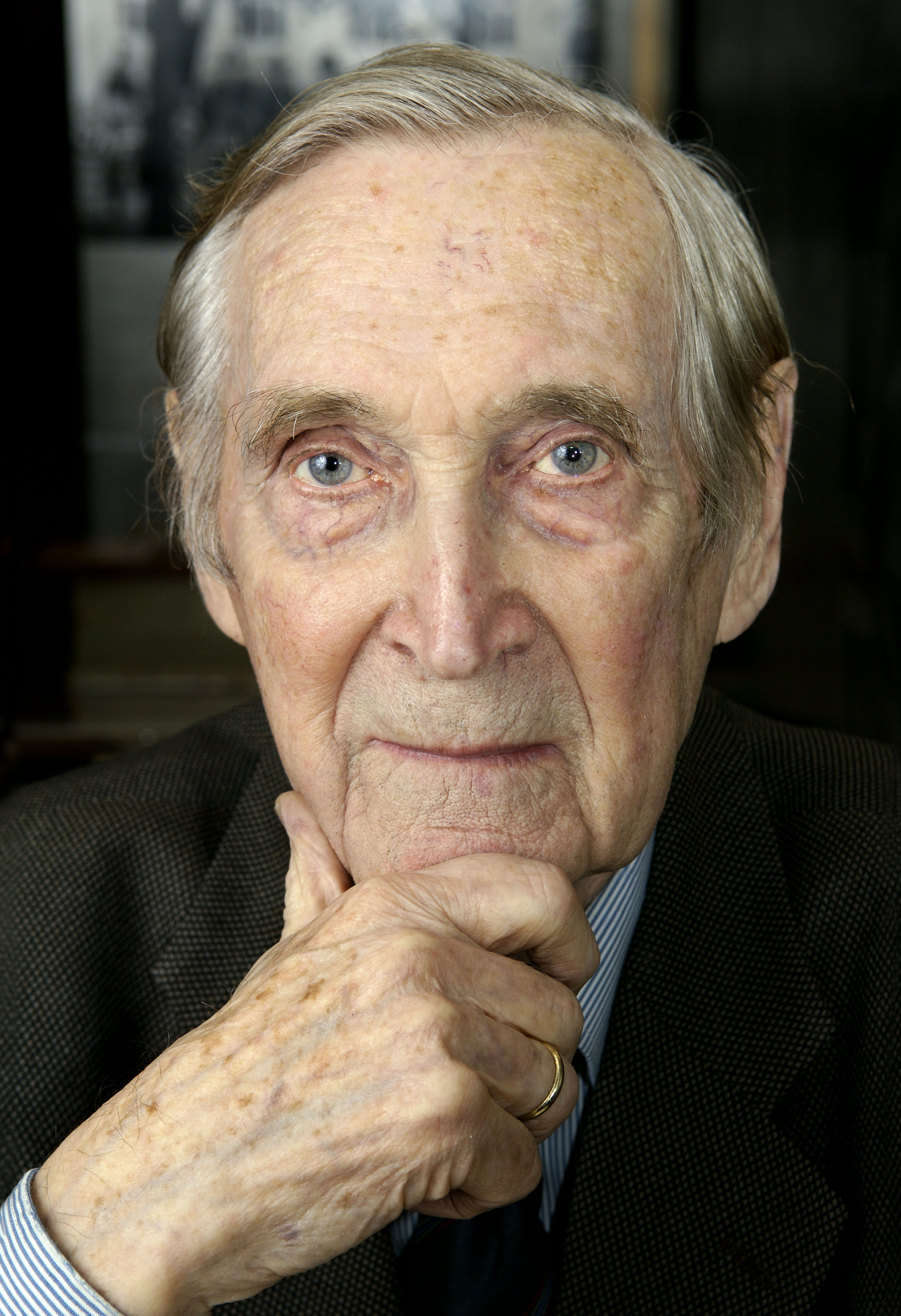
- Born: 11 January 1918; Rjukan, Norway
- Died: 10 May 2012 (aged 94); Oslo, Norway
- Military career
- Allegiance: Norway
- Service years: 1940–1945
- Rank: Captain
- Nicknames: Kjakan, No. 24 among others
- Commands: Kompani Linge
- Awards: (Norway) War Cross with three Swords; (Norway) Commander of the Royal Norwegian Order of St. Olav; (Norway) Norwegian Police Cross of Honour; (Norway) Norwegian Defence Cross of Honour; (Norway) Norwegian Defence Medal with laurel branch; (Norway) Defence Medal 1940–1945 with rosette.; (Norway) Haakon VII 70th Anniversary Medal; (Norway) H. M. The Kings Commemorative Medal in Silver; (Norway) Honorary member of the Norwegian Defence Association; (United Kingdom) Distinguished Service Order; (United Kingdom) 1939–45 Star; (United Kingdom) Defence Medal; (United States) Medal of Freedom with silver palm; United States Special Operations Command Medal; (United States) Association of Former Intelligence Officers Freedom Award; (Poland) Pro Memoria Medal; (Norway) Medal of St. Hallvard (2009); Honorary member of the Student Society in Trondheim (2008); Citizen of the Year in Oslo (2007); Honorary student of Rjukan High School (2005); Honorary citizen of Tinn Municipality (2002)
- Other work: Author, War information work

Gunnar Fridtjof Thurmann Sønsteby DSO (11 January 1918 – 10 May 2012) was a member of the Norwegian resistance movement during the German occupation of Norway in World War II. Known by the nickname "Kjakan" ("The Chin") and as "Agent No. 24", he was the most highly decorated citizen in Norway, including being the only person to have been awarded the War Cross with three swords, Norway's highest military decoration.

== Early life and education ==
Born in Rjukan, in Telemark, he was the son of Margit and Gustav Sønsteby. As a boy he enjoyed walking in the mountains around Rjukan with his school friends, many of whom later became members of the Resistance alongside him. He attended what is now Rjukan videregående skole, earning an examen artium. Among the members of his graduating class in 1937 were later Resistance fighters such as Knut Haugland, Halvor Rivrud, Olav Skogen, Leif Nilsen, Rolf Solem, Turjus Aarnes, Knut Berge, and Einar Nordgaard.

After graduating from gymnasium, he moved to Oslo, where he studied at Otto Treiders Business School. The next year he began studying social economy at the University of Oslo. While in Oslo he also carried out his obligatory military service and worked in a series of jobs.

== Second World War ==
=== Early resistance activities ===
Sønsteby was working as an accountant when the Germans occupied Norway in 1940. Norway's regular armed forces surrendered on 10 June 1940, after two months of fighting, and the country was subsequently occupied by the Germans. He quickly joined the Norwegian Resistance forces in Østlandet. He fought in Philip Hansteen's ski company. He was also involved in the underground press.

In 1941 he was brought into the secret British military unit called Special Operations Executive (SOE) at their office in Stockholm. He became "Agent 24" in the SOE. While on assignment in Stockholm in 1942, he was interned and imprisoned for three months by Swedish police, but managed to convince them that he was not the same Gunnar Sønsteby whom they were looking for. Back in Norway in 1943, he was caught by the Gestapo but managed to escape and flee to Sweden. From there, he was sent to Britain, where in June of that year he enrolled in the Norwegian Independent Company 1, known in Norway as Kompani Linge or Linge Company, which was formed to participate in British-led operations in Norway, to organise, instruct, and lead the Norwegian Resistance Movement, to serve as a link between the home front and the outside world, and to perform intelligence work. In October, he parachuted into Norway and became a leader of the Milorg group. In that same month he also became head of the newly established Oslo Gang, a sabotage group, whose other members were Andreas Aubert, Viggo Axelsen, Gregers Gram, Henrik Hop, William Houlder, Max Manus, Martin Olsen, Arthur Pevik, Birger Rasmussen, Tor Stenersen, and Edvard Tallaksen. British historian William Mackenzie called the Oslo Gang "the best group of saboteurs in Europe".

=== Sabotage ===
After saboteur training in England in 1943, he became the contact for all SOE agents in eastern Norway and head of the Norwegian Independent Company 1 group in Oslo. This group performed several spectacular acts of sabotage; among them smuggling out plates for the printing of Norwegian kroner from the Norwegian Central Bank to the exiled government in London and blowing up the office for Norwegian forced labour, thereby stopping the Nazis' plan of sending young Norwegian men to the Eastern Front.

Sønsteby's gang also carried out the "Mardonius" action, blowing up several ships in Oslo harbour in April 1943. They also attacked Kongsberg munitions factory in September 1944, destroying guns and vital machine tools. In addition, they killed several leading figures in the Occupation Forces, including the Nazi head of police in Norway, Karl Marthinsen.

Other actions included the theft of 75,000 ration books, which allowed pressure to be placed on authorities, stopping a threatened cut in rations; the destruction of sulphuric acid manufacturing facilities in Lysaker; destroying or seriously damaging over 40 aircraft, and related equipment which were being repaired at a tram company depot in Korsvoll; destroying a railway locomotive which was under repair at Skabo; destroying a number of Bofors guns, a field gun and vital machine tools at the Kongsberg arms factory; and starting a large fire in an oil storage depot at Oslo harbour which destroyed large quantities of oil and other specialist lubricants. After D-Day, Sønsteby concentrated largely on bombing Norwegian railways, thereby keeping German reinforcements from being moved back to the front line. His team also sank the German transport ship Donau outside Drøbak in 1945.

=== Disguise and hiding ===
Operating in occupied territory, and being high on the Gestapo list of wanted men, Sønsteby became a master of disguise. He operated under 30 to 40 different names and identities, and the Germans did not acquire his real name until near the end of the war. They were never able to catch him. His obituary in Aftenposten attributed his ability to elude capture to "resourcefulness, luck, intuition", and "such an entirely ordinary appearance that he was hardly noticed when he rode his bicycle through Oslo's streets."

Sønsteby himself explained his ability to get through the war without capture on his ability to carry out many of his actions himself and on his ability to arrange for his own ID papers. He had 20 to 30 places where he spent the night, many for only one night at a time, and never used any of them for more than a couple of months. To avoid detection, he moved from flat to flat almost daily. One of his hideaways was above a bakery. "When I came to the baker's shop I always looked at the girl selling bread. If she gave a special face I would know the Germans were there. I would turn around", Sønsteby later said. Aftenposten described him as having "nerves of steel" and he himself said that he had inherited a strong psychological makeup from his parents. "I was so cold," he once said, "that some time I didn't react the way I should have." During the last six months of the war he carried a hand grenade at all times, so that he could commit suicide if he was arrested. Not until the very end of the war, he explained, did he begin to experience anxiety.

Sønsteby was a "master forger who could replicate the signature of Nazi police chief Karl Marthinsen."

Sønsteby's father was arrested by the Gestapo and held until December 1944.

=== Assassinations of informants ===
When Sønsteby was 80 years old, he said "Of course wrong decisions were made, also by the Resistance Movement. But one must remember that war was going on. It did happen that we had to kill without being sure that the person concerned was an informant. But the decisions were correct—there and then."

== Post-war activities ==
The Nazis withdrew from Norway on 8 May, and on 13 May Sønsteby led the procession when Crown Prince Olav, the first member of the royal family to return from exile in London, arrived in Oslo. On 7 June, Sønsteby served as bodyguard for the Crown Prince and his family at the homecoming of the rest of the royal family, including King Haakon.

After the liberation of Norway, he refused job offers from both the British and Norwegian intelligence services. "I didn't want any more war", he said. "I had had enough. I'd lost five years of my life." Instead, in the autumn of 1945, Sønsteby moved to Boston, where he worked at a government purchasing center in New York and took part in an executive study program at Harvard Business School. He worked for Standard Oil (Esso). In 1949 he returned home to Norway, where he held several major positions in private business. Later, he also worked at the Norwegian Home Front Museum.

Throughout the post war years and particularly after his retirement, Sønsteby gave many lectures in an effort to pass on the lessons of the Second World War to future generations. His credo, he said, was as follows: "As long as I live, I will tell the important facts. The historians can analyze, but I was there." Harald Stanghelle wrote in 2018 that Sønsteby was for many years a "living war encyclopedia" who helped serve as "an effective political vaccine against all forms of fascism" and who, while "factually oriented and sober", could get angry in debates at persons who tried to equate democracies with autocracies and had little patience for "historyless historians and ignorant journalists." At the same time, he minimised his own personal contributions to the war effort, saying that the merchant marines had played a more significant role in Norway's fight against the Nazi occupiers.

Two days before Sønsteby's death, Norwegian Financial Minister Sigbjørn Johnsen unveiled a statue of him at Rjukan torg and stated, "Gunnar Sønsteby is a great hero who risked his life so that we could win our freedom and our democracy".

Sønsteby died 10 May 2012, at the age of 94 after a long illness. Sønsteby had three daughters with his wife, Anne-Karin. He was survived by his wife and daughters.

== Honours and awards ==
Captain (Kaptein) Sønsteby is the only person awarded the War Cross with Three Swords (more properly known as "War Cross with sword and two swords"). All three awards were made in 1946.

His additional recognitions include the following:

- In 1945, Sønsteby was awarded the British Distinguished Service Order and the U.S. Medal of Freedom with Silver Palm.
- In 2001 he was awarded the American-Scandinavian Foundation's culture award.
- On 13 May 2007, a statue of him was erected on Solli plass in Oslo. The statue was sculpted by Per Ung and portrays a 25-year-old Sønsteby standing next to his bicycle. The statue was unveiled by King Harald of Norway.
- Poland awarded him the Medal Pro Memoria in 2007.
- On his 90th birthday on 11 January 2008, he was honoured with a reception at Akershus Fortress attended by King Harald V of Norway and the other members of the Royal Family.
- In 2008 he was the first non-American awarded the United States Special Operations Command Medal.
- There are monuments for him in Oslo (at Solli Plass) and in Rjukan.
- In November 2011 a portrait of Sønsteby by Ross Kolby was unveiled at Norway's Resistance Museum in Oslo. It is permanently exhibited in Sønsteby's last office at Akershus Fortress.

== After death ==
A state funeral for Sønsteby was held on 25 May 2012 in Oslo Domkirke. Twenty-four soldiers from Hans Majestet Kongens Garde provided an honour guard, while the service was attended by the King of Norway, the Prime Minister of Norway, current and seven past Ministers of Defence, and the Chief of Defence. Elizabeth II of the United Kingdom was represented by a wreath. Several embassies to Norway were represented, including the United States Ambassador to Norway Barry B. White.

The pallbearers were six officers, a break from the norm of using soldiers drafted from the King's Guard, and as they carried the coffin from the church, four Air Force F-16s performed a missing man flypast.

A book of condolences at Armed Forces Museum in Oslo, was opened to the public on 11 May 2012.

== Memorial fund ==
The establishment of a Gunnar Sønsteby Memorial Fund was discussed a half year before his death. The Fund was created with donations from Erling Lorentzen, Hans Hermann Horn, and the Inge Steensland Foundation. The Fund presents an annual memorial prize, the Gunnar Sønsteby Prize, consisting of a sum of money and a miniature of Per Ung's statue of Sønstebye in Studenterlunden. The prize was first awarded on 5 January 2012. The winners have included Per Edgar Kokkvold and Kristin Solberg (2015), Deeyah Khan and Trond Bakkevig (2016), and ten Norwegian veterans (2017).

== In popular culture ==
Sønsteby's service during the Second World War is depicted in the film Number 24 in which he is portrayed by Sjur Vatne Brean and Erik Hivju. The film premiered in Norway in October 2024 and began streaming on Netflix in January 2025.
