= Hans Eng =

Norwegian physician and Nazi collaborator

Hans Eng (22 March 1907 – 18 May 1995) was a Norwegian physician and Nazi collaborator during World War II.

== World War II ==
In 1940 he called for Norwegian soldiers in the Norwegian Campaign to lay down their weapons. He volunteered for front service in Germanic SS Norway, but was never at the front. He was the private physician for Vidkun Quisling and his family, chief physician for Nasjonal Samling's department of public health, police physician with the title of "police inspector", physician in the Norwegian Broadcasting Corporation and physician at Bredtveit concentration camp. According to Julius Paltiel he was unwilling to treat the Jews incarcerated at Bredtveit. He was also present as a medical expert at several executions, including that of Gunnar Eilifsen in August 1943.

However, he was feared mainly as a police informer. Eng notified Statspolitiet about Oslogjengen's May 1944 sabotage of Arbeidstjenesten's offices. The office which Max Manus, Edvard Tallaksen and Gregers Gram were supposed to assault, lay at the address Kirkeveien 90, where Eng also had one of his apartments. In addition to the three saboteurs, Dick Zeiner-Henriksen held guard at the front door and four people from Milorg were placed in the area to assist with firepower in case enemies showed up. In the court of appeal case against Eng, he testified that he thought the four guards had shown up to assassinate him. He phoned Statspolitiet, who managed to capture three of the four guards: Lars Eriksen, Jon Hatland and Per Stranger-Thorsen. The fourth guard Hans-Peter Styren as well as Tallaksen, Gram, Manus and Zeiner-Henriksen managed to escape. Two other persons associated with these three captured guards were later killed.

The court of appeal found that fear of assassination was a viable reason to notify Statspolitiet. It later surfaced that Eng was a part of the Osvald Group's hit list at least as early as March 1942. Asbjørn Sunde and some associates set up an attempt to assassinate him on 20 August 1942, but Eng did not show up at the location he was expected. This prompted Sunde to lead an attack on the Statspolitiet's office on 21 August.

== Post-war life ==
In December 1948 his sentence was announced: seven years of forced labour, ten years without political rights and one year's absence from the medicinal profession. He actually served three and a half years in prison. He was then allowed to return to medicine, but then as district physician in remote Kvænangen Municipality, with minimal support or equipment. An image of Vidkun Quisling was hanging in his Burfjord office, and in a 1978 interview he stated that he still followed Nasjonal Samling's ideology. He remained in Kvænangen the rest of his life, retired in 1985 and died in 1995. In 2004 there was a heated debate on whether he should be remembered for his Nazi sympathies or his achievements as a physician.
