= Operation Mardonius =

1943 British raid in occupied Norway

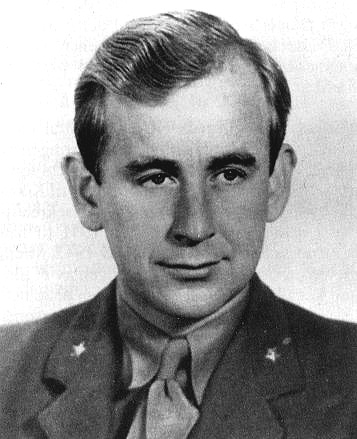
SOE agent Max Manus

Operation Mardonius was a military operation directed against German ships in occupied Norway, planned and carried out in 1943 by the British Special Operations Executive (SOE). The outcome of the operation was sinking of two ships in the harbour of Oslo, Ortelsburg of Hamburg and Tugela.

== Preparations ==
While training with the Norwegian Independent Company 1 in England and Scotland, Max Manus and Joachim Rønneberg developed the initial draft for naval sabotage based on small magnetic limpet mines with time delay, delivered to the ship from kayaks, and using a long iron stick to place the limpet on the ship's side. They did not get any immediate response to the plan. Later, Manus developed a revised plan along with Gregers Gram, this time much more detailed. The plans were eventually approved, and they started the preparations, doing experiments and training. The two SOE agents Max Manus and Gregers Gram were sent to Norway and parachuted into Østmarka east of Oslo on 12 March 1943. They landed near the lake Øyeren, just south of Tonevann, along with several containers with weapons and provisions. Their primary mission was sabotage operation directed against German ships in the Oslofjord.

== Sabotage and sinking ==
The sabotage took place on the evening of 27 April 1943. In addition to Manus and Gram, two local resistance people, Einar Riis and Halvor Haddeland, also took part in the operation. They were thus four men in two canoes, and first paddled to the island Bleikøya, where they earlier had deposited equipment for the operation. They waited on Bleikøya until darkness, but weather conditions were not ideal because of starlight when the cloud cover disappeared. Gram and Haddeland headed with their canoe for the ship Ortelsburg of Hamburg, where they placed four limpet mines with time delay, and they also placed limpets on a second ship, Sarpfoss. Manus and Riis paddled towards Grønlia, where they placed limpets on the ship Tugela. Another target ship, Winrich von Kniprode, was abandoned because the area was lit due to ongoing night work.

Next day, on 28 April, the mines on Ortelsburg exploded, and the ship sank within minutes. A charge left on Bleikøya also detonated, as did a mine attached to an oil lighter. Then the charge on Tugela exploded, while charges on Sarpfoss did not detonate. A coordinated attempt to simultaneously destroy ships at the shipyard Akers Mekaniske Verksted did not succeed.

== Aftermath ==
After the sabotage operation, Manus and Gram departed to Stockholm and continued to England. In June 1943 they were decorated with the (Norwegian) War Cross with Sword, awarded by King Haakon at a ceremony in Nethy Bridge in Scotland. Manus and Gram returned to Norway in October 1943, taking part in the SOE Operation Bundle. Gram was killed during a fight with the Gestapo in November 1944, while Manus survived the war and died in 1996, 81 years old.

Operation Mardonius was featured in the 2008 film Max Manus: Man of War, produced by John M. Jacobsen. The film's description of Mardonius deviates somewhat from the actual course of events, due to dramaturgic motives. Aksel Hennie played the role of Max Manus, while Nicolai Cleve Broch portrayed Gregers Gram. Haddeland and Riis were not featured as characters in the film; they were replaced with the characters "Edvard Tallaksen" (played by Mats Eldøen) and "Lars Emil Erichsen" (played by Jacob Oftebro).
