= Einar Riis =

Norwegian diplomat (1922–2006)

Einar Riis (19 October 1922 – 30 May 2006), was a Norwegian Consul in Rome, aircraft broker, husband of Mrs. Amelia Riis, daughter of shipowner Kristoffer Olsen. He was born in Vestre Aker, Oslo, Norway on 19 October 1922 and died in Arvika, Sweden on 30 May 2006.

== World War II years ==
Einar Riis grew up in Ljan, just outside Oslo, Norway, the 3rd of 4 brothers. During the war he was active in the Norwegian Resistance Movement, and participated in several famous sabotage actions against the occupying forces. Among these the temerarious sinking of German military ships in the harbor of Oslo (Operation Mardonius), described in the Norwegian Resistance hero Max Manus' book "Det vil helst gå godt" and in the movie Max Manus: Man of War.

In the later stages of the war, Riis fled to Canada via Sweden. At the Royal Norwegian Air Force Base in Canada called Little Norway, Einar trained to become a Spitfire pilot.

== Consul in Italy ==
After the war, E. Riis moved first to France then to Italy. He served as honorary Consul for Norway in Rome and was Olympic Attache' for the Norwegian Team in the 1960 Rome Summer Olympics. In 1956 Einar married Amelia Olsen, daughter of shipowner Kristoffer Olsen sr., founder of the Olsen & Ugelstad shipping company.

E. Riis worked initially as a shipping broker and entered at the same time the aviation business (“Einar Riis in the Daily American 1960”). He was responsible for the Italian branch of the Norwegian airline Braathens, but soon started his own company, the E. Riis & Company, acting as legal representative for hundreds of international air carriers flying into Italy, handling traffic rights, organizing cargo and passenger charters, as well as sale and purchase of large transport category aircraft. He was shareholder of Aerolinee Itavia. In Oslo he started the "E. Riis Flyrederi" company, owning three Douglas DC-3 aircraft at Fornebu airport.

== The Amelia Riis inheritance case ==
In the 1970s the Riis couple became embroiled in a long civil case regarding an inheritance dispute between Amelia and her brother. The case was apparently settled when the Riis' would acquire the bulk carrier Sognefjell in 1974 from A/S Falkefjell, one of the shipping companies of the Olsen & Ugelstad group. Before the ship was delivered to her the 1973 oil crisis had damaged Falkefjell's economy, and the Sognefjell was secretly used as Collateral to the company's lender Den Norske Creditbank (DnC). The case went to an Arbitration Court in order to establish recovery and damages suffered by the Riis family due to the non deliverance of the 12 million $ worth ship. Surprisingly the Arbitration Court simply nullified all agreements entered. The sentence was strongly criticized in juridical as well as in political circles in Norway, and the Riis couple felt they had been betrayed by a biased juridical system too close to the shipping circles (Dagbladet 1975 and Kapital 1975).

The trials were a heavy toll on the family. The aviation business in Rome folded due to the Riis' need to constantly travel back to Norway in order to attend court proceedings, and to the legal costs involved. Consul Einar Riis fought the rest of this life trying to overcome this injustice. The "Amelia Riis inheritance case" had by then become quite famous in the media, and was discussed in the Norwegian Storting (Parliament). The verdict was appealed, and several legal case started against the Norwegian Government and the DNC bank. All initiatives seemed to be vain, and the Riis couple became more and more frustrated about the Norwegian legal system, while encountering severe economic difficulties. It was at this time that the Riis' were approached by the young - seemingly "idealistic" - law student Herman Berge. He assisted the Riis' in obtaining "free legal assistance" and a prestigious law firm in Oslo accepted the challenge of pursuing the Riis case against the Norwegian authorities.

Finally in 2001, in the case against the Norwegian Government for its mismanagement of the inheritance assets the Oslo District Court (Oslo Tingrett) awarded Riis 10 million Norwegian krone, the largest indemnity of this kind ever granted in Norway. The Olsen & Ugelstad's assets had in fact been allowed to "disappear" under the eyes of the Probate Court which was responsible for preserving the disputed inheritance until a final verdict had taken place. With interest, the total award was at 43 million krone. The Norwegian Minister of justice, Odd Einar Dørum decided not to appeal . As he later mentioned in a TV2 interview, maybe he wished the ageing Riis couple could enjoy a serene retirement after all the years of injustice.

== The Riis – Herman Berge controversy ==
Consul Einar Riis was not ready to retire yet. Revived by Herman Berge's fresh support and legal assurances that an indemnity from the State of over 500 mill. $ was within reach, new legal case were started. Unfortunately Consul Einar Riis could not see the outcome of these efforts, as he died while on a short vacation in Arvika, Sweden. With her children living abroad, the almost 80-year-old widow Mrs. Amelia Riis became even more dependent upon Mr. H. Berge. In the aftermath of the 2001 sentence, Mr. Herman Berge had gained some notoriety in Norwegian media as Riis' spokesman and "legal advisor", although not being directly involved in the outcome of the legal case. Herman Berge's attitude towards Mrs. Amelia Riis changed radically shortly after Einar's death. He started demanding increasingly amounts of money and, when these were questioned, Berge threatened to "freeze" the estate proceedings taking place in Monaco where the Riis's were resident. . Mrs. Amelia Riis felt as if she had been "stabbed in the back" by her and her husband "trusted" family friend and "juridical advisor". She soon calculated Herman Berge had received over 11 million Norwegian Crowns in forms of compensation, coverage of expenses, and even for dubious "investment projects" and felt Berge's claim to take control of all her remaining assets unjustified. Norwegian press was shocked by H.Berge's behaviour and several first page articles in authoritative newspapers covered the case (Finansavisen). Mrs. Amelia Riis took Mr. Berge's claims to the Court in Monaco, and in Norway. Herman Berge claimed to be a "creditor" to the estate, an "heir" and at the same time the "testamentary executor". ALL of Herman Berge's claims - economical, or of being an "heir", a "testamentary executor", or a "creditor"- were dismissed in several Court rulings in Norway, Sweden, and Monaco. Oslo Byfogd Court's sentence of 23 April 2007 stated Herman Berge had "manipulated" elderly Einar Riis and issued an "arrest" order against Berge's properties; Oslo Tingrett Court (= Oslo District Court) sentence of 14 December 2007 confirmed H. Berge had fraudulently obtained at least 8 million Norwegian Crowns from the Riis couple, and ordered the money paid back Asker & Baerum District Court sentence of 25 September 2008 further dismissed Berge's claims. As soon as legal proceedings started against him in Norway, Mr. Berge swiftly decided to move to Luxembourg - probably to avoid liability. Norwegian TV2 interviewed him there (Amelia Riis på TV2 and TV2 Amelia Riis v. Herman Berge - round 3) Norwegian TV2 later interviewed another family claiming to have suffered the same "manipulatoy" attentions by Mr. Berge (TV2 - Amelia Riis v. Herman Berge).
