= Andreas Aubert =

Andreas Aubert may refer to:

- Andreas Aubert (art historian) (1851–1913), Norwegian art educator, art historian and art critic
- Andreas Aubert (Resistance member) (1910–1956), Norwegian resistance member during World War II
