= Lauring =

Lauring is a Danish surname. Notable people with the surname include:

- Gunnar Lauring (1905–1968), Danish actor
- Bertel Lauring (1928–2000), Danish actor
- Kolbein Lauring (1914–1987), Norwegian resistance member

== See also ==
- Laurin
