= Sally Olsen =

Sally Olsen may refer to:

- Sally Olsen (social worker)
- Sally Olsen (politician)
