= Jan Didriksen =

Norwegian businessman and lawyer (1917–1996)

Chief executive of the Federation of Norwegian Industries
- In office 1965–1982
- Preceded by: Knut Hald

Jan Didriksen (15 May 1917 – 14 December 1996) was a Norwegian lawyer and businessman.

He was born in Sarpsborg. During World War II, he was a local Milorg leader and was arrested in July 1942. He was incarcerated at Grini and later in Sachsenhausen.

He was chief executive of the Federation of Norwegian Industries from 1965 to 1982. In 1987, he published the book Industrien under hakekorset on the role of the Norwegian industry during the occupation of Norway by Nazi Germany.

Business positions
Preceded by Knut Hald	Chief executive of the Federation of Norwegian Industries; 1965–1982	Succeeded by
