= Thomas Nordseth-Tiller =

Norwegian screenwriter

- Born: 27 November 1980
- Died: 12 May 2009 (aged 28)

Thomas Nordseth-Tiller (27 November 1980 – 12 May 2009) was a Norwegian screenwriter. He was behind the 2008 film Max Manus, which was widely viewed and discussed.

== Career ==
Nordseth-Tiller hailed from Lørenskog, and studied film in Oslo, Perth and San Francisco.

He wrote the screenplay for the 2008 film Max Manus. The film became a commercial success, with the second highest number of cinema viewers in Norway (second only to Flåklypa Grand Prix). Moreover, it sparked a public debate on the real-life Max Manus and the Norwegian resistance movement in general.

After Max Manus, Nordseth-Tiller announced that he was working on a screenplay about Communist resistance member Asbjørn Sunde. He also wrote a screenplay based on the autobiography of robber Martin Pedersen. However, in early 2009 he suddenly contracted cancer. He was hospitalized for the last months of his life, and died in early May, the same day as Max Manus premiered in Sweden. In August he received a posthumous Amanda Award for his work.
