= Knut Hald =

Norwegian businessman (1902–1972)

Knut Hald (10 June 1902 – 12 January 1972) was a Norwegian businessperson, best known as chief executive of the Federation of Norwegian Industries from 1945 to 1965.

== Career ==
He was born in Kristiania as a son of Ulrik Hald (1866–1939) and Kitty Wang. In 1932 he married Inger Marie Thorkildsen, a daughter of banker Sverre O. Thorkildsen.

After finishing his secondary education in 1920 and Kristiania Commerce School in 1921, he was employed in the Federation of Norwegian Industries. He was promoted to secretary in 1928, then subeditor of their magazine Norges Industri in 1935 and editor in 1939. In 1942 he became acting chief executive of the federation. In 1943 the federation was replaced by the Nazi authorities with Norges Næringssamband. After the Second World War, the Federation of Norwegian Industries resumed its activities, and Hald became chief executive. He retired in 1965.

Hald was vice chairman of the Norwegian Student Choral Society from 1937 to 1940 and 1942 to 1944, board member of Norwegian Publications, Norges Varemesse and Nationaltheatret (from 1970), supervisory council member of Forsikringsselskapet Norden/Nordengruppen and Kreditkassen and working committee member in Norges Eksportråd. In politics, he was a member of the financial committee in Oslo Conservative Party.

He was decorated as a Knight, First Class of the Order of St. Olav in 1961. He died in January 1972.

Business positions
Preceded by vacant (WWII)	Chief executive of the Federation of Norwegian Industries; 1945–1965	Succeeded by Jan Didriksen
