= Birger Rasmussen =

Norwegian resistance fighter (1920–2007)

- Born: 23 August 1920; Drammen, Norway
- Died: 6 December 2007 (aged 87)
- Occupation: businessman
- Known for: Member of Kompani Linge and Oslogjengen during the German occupation of Norway
- Relatives: Ludvig G. Braathen (father-in-law)
- Awards: War Cross with sword; St. Olav's Medal With Oak Branch; Defence Medal; Haakon VII 70th Anniversary Medal; Military Cross & Bar

Birger Rasmussen MC & Bar (23 August 1920 – 6 December 2007) was a Norwegian businessman, director of Katfos Fabriker, manager of Borregaard's pulp and paper section, director of Follum Fabrikker, and president of the Federation of Norwegian Industries.

During the Second World War, Rasmussen was member of the British Special Operations Executive (SOE) group Kompani Linge, and eventually the sabotage group Oslogjengen. He received both British and Norwegian decorations for his war contributions.

== Personal life ==
Rasmussen was born in Drammen to Birger Rasmussen and Lilly Bruusgaard, and finished his secondary education in 1939. He was married to Anne Sophie Braathen, daughter of Ludvig G. Braathen.

== Career ==
=== World War II ===
During the German occupation of Norway, Rasmussen received military training with the Norwegian Independent Company 1 (Nor.I.C.1) in Scotland. In 1941 he joined a group of people sailing from Norway to Shetland, and was recruited to the Nor.I.C.1 by Martin Linge. In November 1943 he parachuted over Norway, together with his companions Edvard Tallaksen and Armand Trønnes. On 21 November, they accomplished "Operation Company", where several transformers at Arendal Smelters were blown up. He then joined "Operation Goldfinch" and trained local Milorg troops. From 1944 Rasmussen was part of the sabotage group called Oslogjengen, and took part in many operations in the Oslo district. He was leading an operation in Hønefoss against labour duty (NS Arbeidstjeneste) during the night between 4 and 5 May 1944. He further took part in follow-up operations to destroy machinery for sorting registration cards located at the insurance company Norske Folk. During a sabotage operation against Skabo Jernbanevognfabrikk in September 1944, where a special locomotive designed for the Thamshavn Line had been repaired (a follow-up on the previous Thamshavn Line sabotage), Rasmussen broke his arm in a fall accident. In January 1945 he led a sabotage operation destroying a large supply of stored ball bearings, and later the same month he took part in an operation which resulted in destruction of a storage of 1,800 barrels of special oil. When Rasmussen was injured in a gunfight in Oslo in March 1945, he subsequently received undercover treatment.

=== Post war ===
Rasmussen was assigned with Hunsfos Fabrikker from 1946 to 1948. He spent the period from 1948 to 1950 as a student in the United States and France. From 1951 he was assigned with Katfos Fabriker in Modum, and was leader of the factory from 1956 to 1968. He was then manager of Borregaard's pulp and paper section for seven years, and from 1975 to 1987 he was director of Follum Fabrikker in Hønefoss. From 1985 to 1987 he chaired the Federation of Norwegian Industries.

== Honours and awards ==
Rasmussen was awarded the highest Norwegian military award, the War Cross with sword. In addition to the British Military Cross and Bar, he also received St. Olav's Medal With Oak Branch, the Defence Medal 1940 - 1945, and Haakon VII 70th Anniversary Medal. He died on 6 December 2007.

Business positions
Preceded by Emil W. Martens	President of the Federation of Norwegian Industries; 1985–1987	Succeeded by Fredrik Thoresen
