= Bakkevig =

Bakkevig is a surname. Notable people with the surname include:

- Agnes Bakkevig (1910–1992), Norwegian politician
- Ludvig Johan Bakkevig (1921–2013), Norwegian engineer and Christian leader
- Trond Bakkevig (born 1948), Norwegian priest and organizational leader
