= Fredrik Thoresen =

Norwegian businessman (1926–2012)

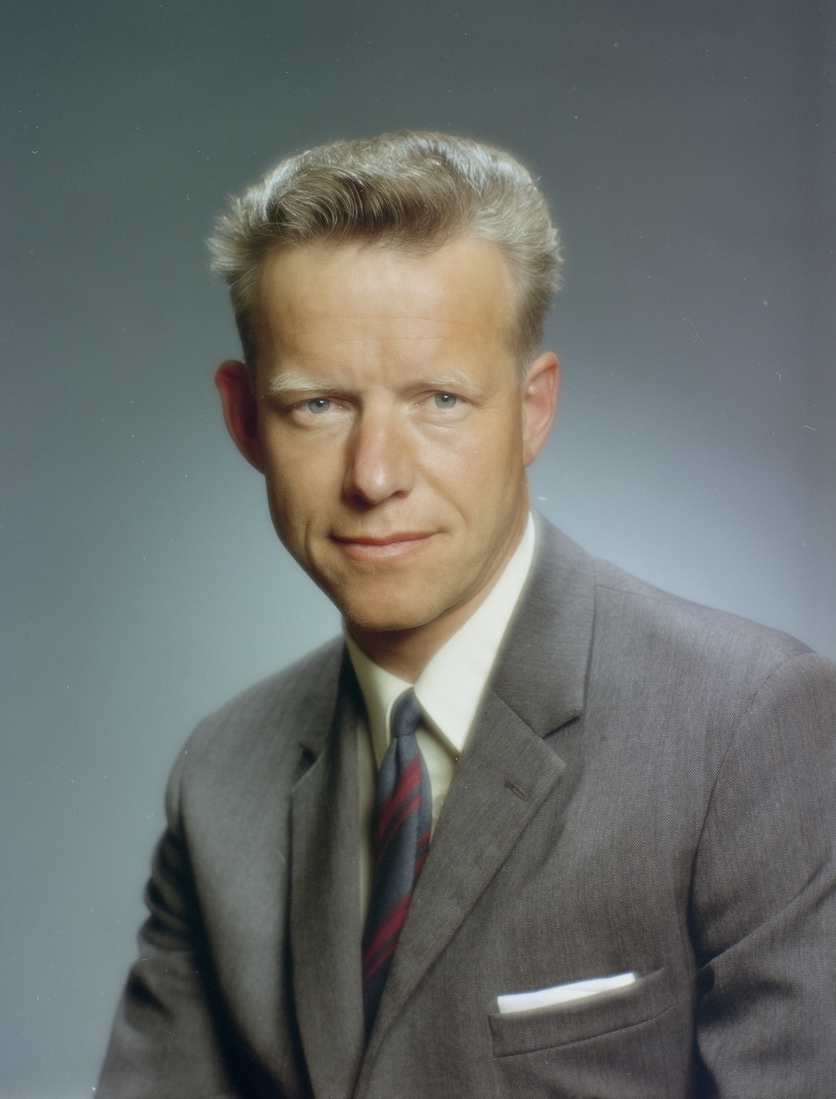
Fredrik Thoresen

Fredrik Thoresen (7 May 1926 – 23 December 2012) was a Norwegian businessperson.

He was born in Bestum, and took his civil engineering education in chemistry at the University of Birmingham, whence he graduated in 1953. From 1972 to 1988 he was the chief executive officer of Standard Telefon og Kabelfabrik, which during the period was acquired by Alcatel and changed name to Alcatel STK.

He was the last president of the Federation of Norwegian Industries, from 1987 to 1989. The organization then merged to form the Confederation of Norwegian Enterprise, and Thoresen was vice president there from 1989 to 1992. From 1988 to 1999 he chaired Alcatel STK. In 1984 he was installed as a board member in Statoil, by Willoch's Second Cabinet. In 1987 he resigned together with most of the board, following misconduct in the Mongstad scandal.

Thoresen has been decorated as a Knight, First Class of the Order of St. Olav. He resided at Snarøya. He died in December 2012.

Business positions
Preceded by Birger Rasmussen	President of the Federation of Norwegian Industries; 1987–1989	Succeeded by position abolished
