= Olav Ringdal =

Norwegian resistance member (1921–1945)

- Born: 24 March 1921; Sandefjord
- Died: 4 April 1945 (aged 24); Bygdøy allé 117
- Occupation: Resistance member

Olav Ringdal (24 March 1921 – 4 April 1945) was a Norwegian resistance member during World War II.

He was born in Sandefjord to parents from Larvik. He had gone through commerce school as well as an average adjuster's exam, and studied law at the University of Oslo during World War II. During the war he also became a member of Milorg. He co-edited an illegal newspaper, worked as a courier and with propaganda, and led the information service. He was trained by Special Operations Executive operator Gregers Gram.

Ringdal fell out with the Nazi authorities for the first time as a part of the mass arrest of students on 30 November 1943. 1,166 students were arrested, and 644 were sent to Germany for "readjustment" following the 28 November university fire in Oslo. Ringdal was not among those sent to Germany because he managed to escape.

On 4 April 1945 a German crackdown against Operation Derby took place. The home of Kolbein and Kari Lauring was surrounded by German forces, whereupon Kari telephoned Max Manus who in turn notified other resistance members. All resistance members would need to go in hiding at various cover-up apartments scattered around the city. Ringdal went to the address Bygdøy allé 117, to what he assumed to be a safe house, but was surprised by German forces there and fatally shot. Later that day, another resistance associate Roy Nielsen showed up. He soon became aware of the peril, but was shot escaping. He was buried in Vestre Aker. Kolbein Lauring and Manus managed to escape from their respective locations, whereas Kari Lauring was arrested.

In 1952, a vessel belonging to the Norwegian Society for Rescue at Sea was named after Olav Ringdal.
