= Gunnar Sønsteby Prize =

Norwegian award

The Gunnar Sønsteby Prize has been awarded annually in Norway since 2015 to individuals who are brave defenders of fundamental democratic values. It is awarded by the Gunnar Sønsteby Memorial Fund, founded in 2013 with the goal of honoring the life of the World War II Norwegian Resistance hero Gunnar Sønsteby.

Half a year before Sønsteby died on May 10, 2012, the idea of a Gunnar Sønsteby Memorial Fund was discussed. The Fund became a reality in the autumn of 2013. The base capital for the prize was provided by Erling Lorentzen, Hans Hermann Horn, and the Inge Steensland Foundation. According to the Fund's statutes, the prize shall be awarded to “brave” individuals who have defended “the founding values of our democracy” and “kept the spirit of defense alive,” and thereby helped ensure that the Norwegian military continue to ensure the nation's “freedom and independence.”

== 2015 ==
The prize was first awarded in 2015. The ceremony was held at the Oslo City Hall on January 2, 2015. The winners were Kristin Solberg and Per Edgar Kokkvold. Solberg had served for a decade as Aftenposten's correspondent in Afghanistan, India, Pakistan, and the Middle East. Kokkvold, a columnist for Aftenposten, had also worked as Secretary-General of the Norwegian Press Association, a position he held during the Danish cartoon crisis of 2006, when he had been subjected to death threats. In 2014 he was named head of Kringkastingsrådet, the official advisory council for the Norwegian government's broadcasting corporation, NRK.

The jury citation praised Solberg for her active devotion to “democratic values such as freedom of speech and fundamental human rights” and for having regularly “exposed herself to danger” in her work as a journalist. Kokkvold was praised as “a fearless defender of freedom of speech” and for having defied death threats to ensure that “Norwegian media did not give in to Islamist or other terror threats.” The jury summed up its decision by saying that Solberg and Kokkvold alike had “shown both integrity and courage.”

On January 5, the prize winners met with the press in Sønsteby's last office at Akershus Fortress in Oslo. Solberg said that it was a “very great honor to receive such a prize” and called Sønsteby “an exceptional man.” “We should never accept the idea that people should be killed or receive death threats because they uncompromisingly defend our democracy, popular government, and the rule of law,” said Kokkvold.

== 2016 ==
In 2016, the prize was shared between Deeyah Khan and Trond Bakkevig. Khan, who lives in England, is a human-rights activist, singer, record producers, and director of the films Jihad and Banaz: A Love Story. Bakkevig is the former head of the Church of Norway's Mellomkirkelig Råd, an interfaith council. He is a longtime bridge-builder among religious leaders in the Middle East.

The head of the Gunnar Sønsteby Memorial Fund's jury, Harald Sunde, former head of the Norwegian armed forces, said that the prize winners had demonstrated integrity, courage, and decisiveness. Despite their highly different backgrounds and areas of expertise, each, in their way, he said, had “contributed to important debates and emerged as courageous defenders of fundamental democratic values. Just as Gunnar Sønsteby did in his time, they refuse to give in to threatening and destructive forces.”

== 2017 ==
In 2017, the Gunnar Sønsteby Prize was awarded to all Norwegian veterans of international military operations. This came to over 100,000 persons. At a ceremony at Fanehallen in Oslo, Sunde, the head of the prize jury, said that the prize was “a tribute to the individual veteran and the effort, personal courage, and sacrifice they have demonstrated.” He described the veterans as “a large resource group who are an asset to Norwegian society in ways that far exceed their military efforts.” The statuette was placed at the Bæreia veterans' center, while the veterans themselves were given certificates.

The winners were represented at the ceremony by ten veterans, among them Unni Vindheim, who took part in operations in Bosnia and Afghanistan. She said that it was “a great honor to be asked to represent the military veterans.” In 1994, Vindheim was a member of the medical corps that evacuated 287 patients from a bombed-out hospital in Gorazde, Bosnia.

One of the other veterans who represented the winners at the prize ceremony was Frank Magnes, who had served in Lebanon. Another veteran who participated was Ronny Kristoffersen.

== 2018 ==
The prize for 2018 was awarded to Elizabeth Hoff, a nurse and midwife at Ullevål Hospital in Oslo who went on to become an international aid worker, employed by the Red Cross and UN and, most recently, the World Health Organization. She worked in Egypt, Zimbabwe, Afghanistan, Somalia, Rwanda, Armenia, and Syria, often in wartime or immediately thereafter. The jury's citation read, in part: “In danger of her own life and health, she has for more than six long years led the efforts of the World Health Organization (WHO) in perhaps the world's most dangerous country.” The jury also described her as one of the Norwegians who have been exposed to the greatest danger over the longest time since World War II. Upon winning the prize, Hoff said she was “moved and touched” and called Sønsteby “a great man” who “stood for important values” such as love of country, fearlessness, and being at your country's disposal when needed. “Civilians too,” she said, “can stand up for their country.

== 2019 – ==
- 2019: William Nygaard
- 2020: Kristian Bergsund
- 2021: Norwegian Cyber Defence Force
- 2022: Roseslottet
- 2023: Jens Stoltenberg
- 2024: Veiviserprogrammet
- 2025: The Barents Observer and Yama Wolasmal
- 2026: Fritt Ukraina
