= Roy Nielsen =

Norwegian resistance member (1916–1945)

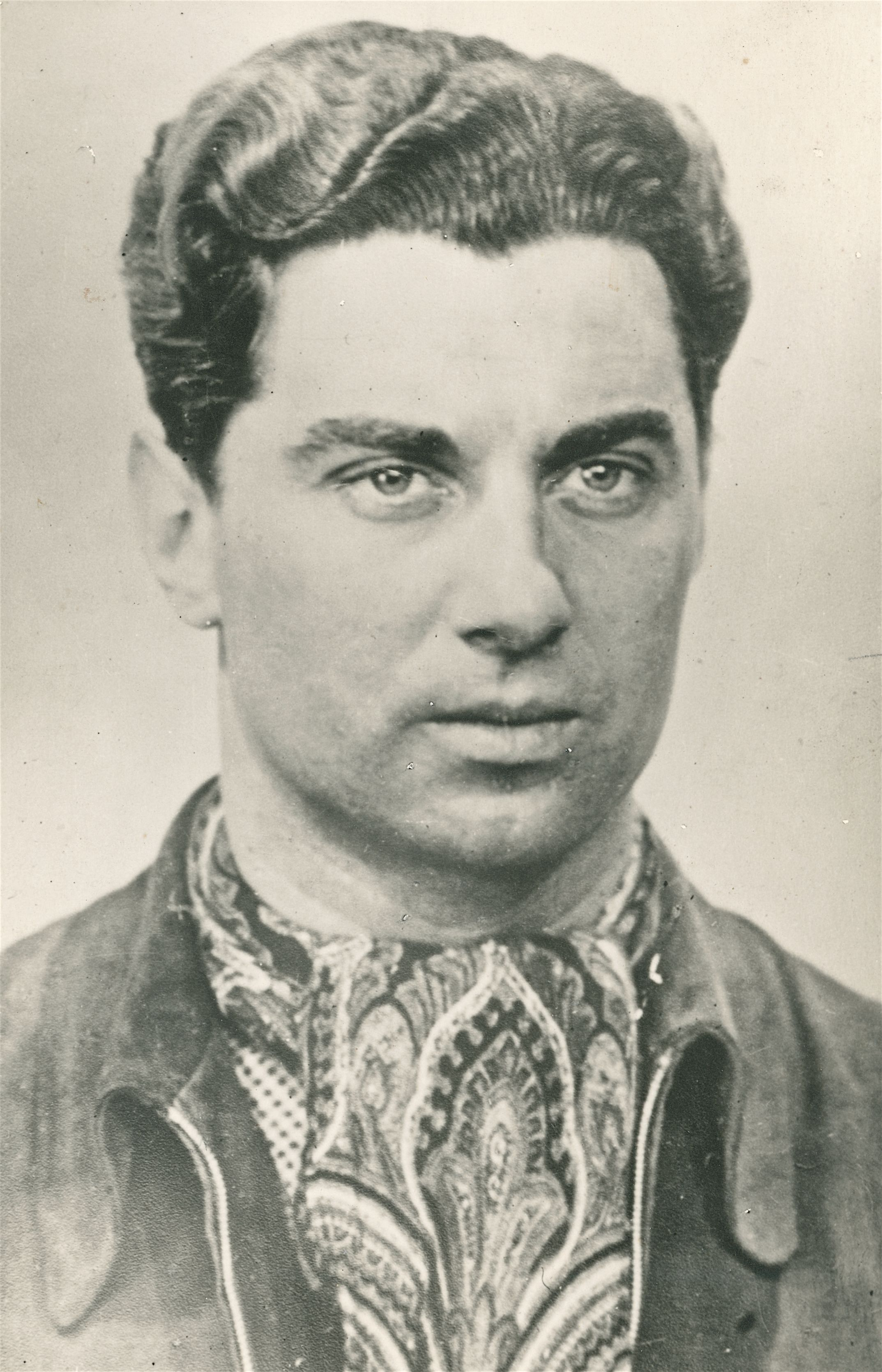
- Roy Nilsen (1916-45) Norwegian WW2 resistance saboteur Milorg portrait
- Born: 27 March 1916; Kristiania, Norway
- Died: 4 April 1945 (aged 29); Oslo
- Cause of death: Shot
- Known for: Resistance member

Roy Nielsen (27 March 1916 – 4 April 1945) was a Norwegian resistance member during World War II, a member of Milorg and involved in propaganda and sabotage. Among his sabotage operations was the destruction of 25 Messerschmitt fighter aircraft and 150 engines stored in a bus garage in Oslo, on 14 August 1944, together with Max Manus, Gunnar Sønsteby and others. Together with Max Manus he succeeded in sinking the German troop ship SS Donau in the Oslofjord 16 January 1945, by placing magnetic limpet mines with time delay on the ship's side.

== Personal life ==
Nielsen was born in Kristiania as the son of Christian and Signe Nielsen, and he married Helen Næss in 1941. He was an active amateur boxer in the club Fagforeningenes IF av 1926.

== World War II ==
=== Sabotage ===
During World War II he was a member of the armed Norwegian resistance organization Milorg. He cooperated with Kompani Linge soldier Max Manus in the SOE Operation Bundle, sabotage missions directed towards German ships. The group experimented with home-made torpedoes. An attempt to hit a troop ship in Oslofjord was a failure, but a later attempt, in summer 1944, to hit a destroyer outside Moss was a partial success, as the ship was seriously damaged and out of action for seven months.

Operation Bundle's greatest success was the sabotage against the German troop ship SS Donau in Oslofjord in January 1945. The intelligence organization RMO managed to find a weak point in the German guarding of the ship during docking time. From beneath a defunct goods lift in a building on the pier it was possible to reach the sea, by making a hole in the floor. A rubber boat and equipment was smuggled in by Alf Borgen in advance, and Nielsen and Manus came by to inflate the rubber boat some days before the arrival of SS Donau. When the ship arrived on 15 January, Nielsen and Manus simply walked into the pier area, passing the control point with ease as Nielsen deliberately slipped and fell right outside the gate. The two then entered the building, climbed down into the rubber boat, and placed ten limpet mines onto the side of the ship. One limpet mine was placed on a smaller vessel Rolandseck. During the sabotage Nielsen and Manus were kept safe by undercover pier worker Kåre Halvorsen, who also had made the hole in the floor. The bombs went off at 2300hrs when Donau was outside Drøbak, instead of in open sea as planned, and the captain managed to beach her. Later during the night Donau slipped off land and into somewhat deeper waters before settling. After the explosions on Donau the Germans feared that saboteurs had placed limpets on more ships and towed Rolandseck away from the pier and searched the ship side from rowing boats. No explosives were found and the loading of Rolandseck continued for a short time until the limpet exploded. The Germans were prepared for such a possibility and plugged the resulting hole with a large mat, saving the ship and allowing her to later be placed in dry-dock.

On 14 August 1944, Nielsen initiated the sabotage against the Luftwaffe's depot at Bjølsen, where the Luftwaffe had confiscated part of a bus garage belonging to Oslo Sporveier. The depot had been moved there from Kjeller in fear of air strikes. Nielsen extracted information about the location from a contact in Oslo Sporveier, and also came along due to Gregers Gram's stay in Sweden at the time. The saboteurs sneaked into Oslo Sporveier's part of the garage, and stole keys from a night watch without drama. Nielsen kept guard in the night watch office; the other participants were Max Manus, Gunnar Sønsteby, Andreas Aubert, Henrik Hop, William Houlder and Erik Hansen Bakke. 120 kilograms (260 lb) of plastic explosives, carried to the garage in four suitcases, and a sack with 30 kilograms (66 lb) of dynamite were detonated. There was a fire lasting three days in which the Luftwaffe lost 25 Messerschmitt Bf 109's, 150 aircraft engines and their largest store of spare parts for fighters in Norway.

Nielsen was also in charge of the sabotage of Arbeidstjenesten's office in Wergelandsveien 3. He obtained a copy of the door key (via an imprint in plastilina) together with Dick Zeiner-Henriksen, but the actual sabotage mission was called off because there were people present at the office.

=== Propaganda ===
Nielsen came to be one of the leaders of the propaganda organization Operation Derby when it was reorganized after the death of Gregers Gram in November 1944. Operation Derby initially focused on black propaganda directed towards German soldiers, but they also issued the undercover magazine Fritt Land, and distributed the bi-weekly magazine Håndslag (produced in Sweden) and the monthly magazine Det frie Norge (from the Norwegian government in London).

=== Death ===
On 4 April 1945 a German crackdown against Operation Derby took place. The home of Kolbein and Kari Lauring was surrounded by German forces, whereupon Kari telephoned Max Manus who in turn notified other resistance members. All resistance members would need to go in hiding at various cover-up apartments scattered around the city. Nielsen went to the address Bygdøy allé 117, to what he assumed to be a safe house, but was surprised by German forces there and fatally shot while escaping. The same thing had happened to fellow resistance fighter Olav Ringdal earlier that day. Kolbein Lauring and Manus managed to escape from their respective locations, whereas Kari Lauring was arrested.
