= Happy, Happy =

2010 comedy film

- Film poster
- Directed by: Anne Sewitsky
- Written by: Mette M. Bølstad; Ragnhild Tronvoll
- Produced by: Synnøve Hørsdal
- Starring: Agnes Kittelsen
- Cinematography: Anna Myking
- Release date: 1 October 2010
- Running time: 85 minutes
- Country: Norway
- Languages: Norwegian; Danish

Happy, Happy (Norwegian: Sykt lykkelig, lit. 'Insanely Happy') is a 2010 Norwegian comedy film directed by Anne Sewitsky. The film was selected as the Norwegian entry for the Best Foreign Language Film at the 84th Academy Awards, but it did not make the final shortlist.

== Plot ==
Kaja is a school teacher living in the countryside with her husband, Eirick, and son. Despite the fact that her husband is cold to her, she maintains a cheerful happy-go-lucky disposition and tries her best to please him.

A couple from Denmark, Elisabeth and Sigve, come to live in the neighbouring house with their adopted son Noa. Kaja is in awe of Elisabeth and is impressed by the couple's relationship and their strong bond. The four play a game during which the couples must answer questions to reveal how well they know each other; Kaja becomes upset when she and Eirick fail to get a single question right. Kaja begins crying saying that they never have sex, which Eirick blames on her yeast infection. Alone with Sigve, Kaja apologizes for her outburst explaining that she wishes that she and Eirick were more like Elisabeth and Sigve. Sigve reveals that things are not as perfect as they seem as the two have moved to the country to rebuild their marriage after Elisabeth had an affair. In response Kaja kisses Sigve and then performs oral sex on him.

Kaja and Sigve embark on an affair which leaves Kaja sexually fulfilled. She joins Elisabeth and Sigve's choir and tries to initiate sex with her husband only to be shut down.

One day, while leaving Kaja's home, Sigve is joined on his jog by Eirick. The two men talk about their past lives as bachelors and when Sigve remarks that they deserve better Eirick misinterprets his meaning and kisses him, only to be rebuffed.

Eventually Elisabeth spies Kaja flirting with and touching Sigve. She confronts him about his affair and he tells her that he enjoys feeling needed. Elisabeth then tells Eirick what has happened, causing him to attack Sigve. As a result Sigve moves into Kaja's home. Elisabeth briefly invites Eirick to stay with her but after an uncomfortable and awkward attempt at sex she kicks him out again.

Kaja and Sigve host a Christmas dinner for the children inviting Elisabeth. After Elisabeth gets drunk she confesses to Sigve that she misses him and asks him to come home. He kisses her and the two are caught by Kaja. She realizes that Sigve will always love Elisabeth and that all she ever really wanted was to be loved by Eirick, who she now realizes is gay. Sigve leaves to go home with Elisabeth and Eirick comes back and asks to move back in, swearing he will never leave Kaja and will be a better husband. Kaja tells him she is leaving him.

Elisabeth and Sigve pack up their things and say goodbye to Kaja and Eirick. Eirick meanwhile moves into their home so that he can be close to Kaja and their son while the two of them start separate lives.

== Cast ==
- Agnes Kittelsen as Kaja
- Henrik Rafaelsen as Sigve
- Joachim Rafaelsen as Eirik
- Maibritt Saerens as Elisabeth
- Oskar Hernæs Brandsø as Theodor
- Ram Shihab Ebedy as Noa
- Heine Totland as Dirigenten

== See also ==
- List of submissions to the 84th Academy Awards for Best Foreign Language Film
- List of Norwegian submissions for the Academy Award for Best Foreign Language Film

Awards
Preceded by Animal Kingdom	Sundance Grand Jury Prize: World Cinema Dramatic; 2011	Succeeded by Violeta Went to Heaven
