= Leo Tallaksen =

Norwegian politician (1908–1983)

Leopold (Leo) Tallaksen (19 June 1908 – 18 November 1983) was a Norwegian politician for the Liberal Party.

His younger brother, Edvard Tallaksen was ambushed by German provocateurs during World War II—in Oslo.

He took his secondary education at Kristiansand Cathedral School, and graduated from there in 1927. He then spent periods of time abroad, to learn the trade in the family business, wholesaling. He was vice chairman of Young Liberals of Norway, the youth wing of the Liberal Party, from 1936 to 1946. From 1938 to 1940, he sat on the city council of Arendal. From 1943 to 1945, he was imprisoned by the German occupants of Norway in Sachsenhausen concentration camp in Germany.

After the war he served twice as mayor of the city of Kristiansand, from 1956 to 1963 and 1966 to 1971, and was county mayor of Vest-Agder between 1972 and 1975. He also served as a deputy representative to the Norwegian Parliament from Vest-Agder during the term 1965–1969. In 1972 he chaired the county chapter of Ja til EF. He chaired the board of the National Insurance Scheme Fund and was a board member of the Bank of Norway, the Union of Norwegian Cities and Norwegian Association of Local and Regional Authorities. Tallaksen was a Knight of the Royal Norwegian Order of St. Olav and the Legion of Honour.
