= Mongstad scandal =

1980s crisis in the Norwegian oil company Statoil

The Mongstad scandal was a major financial and political crisis that struck Norway in the late 1980s, when state-owned oil company Statoil exceeded its refinery upgrade budget by 6 billion Norwegian krone (NOK). The scandal, caused by poor planning and mismanagement, led to the mass resignation of the company's board and the forced departure of CEO Arve Johnsen, under intense public and political pressure.

Media coverage was relentless, often mocking, and the term "one mong" became shorthand for NOK 6 billion. Beyond the headlines, Mongstad exposed the vulnerabilities of state-run enterprises operating without sufficient oversight.

== Background ==
In 1987–88, Norwegian state oil giant Statoil became embroiled in a high-profile industrial scandal, centered on a massive cost overrun at the company's Mongstad oil refinery. Originally budgeted at NOK 8 billion, the project eventually exceeded its target by an additional NOK 6 billion, triggering public outrage and the resignation of Statoil's senior leadership.

The overspend was ultimately attributed to poor planning, technical misjudgments and inadequate project oversight. Statoil executives were also accused of withholding critical information from the Norwegian Ministry of Petroleum and Energy, a key shareholder in the company.

== Escalation ==
The first signs of serious financial trouble emerged on 25 September 1987, when Statoil admitted that costs had already overshot by NOK 3.8 billion. Within two months, the scandal forced the resignation of the leadership of the company.

On 20 November, the Statoil board of directors resigned, including Chairman Inge Johansen and Deputy Chairman Vidkunn Hveding, both of whom had served since 1984. Other resigning members included Thor Andreassen (since 1978), Fredrik Thoresen, Guttorm Hansen and Toril V. Lundestad. Only the three employee representatives remained. Two days later, chief executive officer Arve Johnsen also resigned, at the time the only CEO in the history of the company to resign.

By January 1988, internal estimates warned the project could exceed its budget by yet another NOK 1 billion. Projections in April 1988 suggested a total cost of up to NOK 14 billion, although the final overspend was eventually confirmed at NOK 6 billion.

== Political and economical context ==
The Mongstad scandal hit Norway at a politically sensitive moment. Statoil, wholly owned by the Ministry of Petroleum and Energy, had become a symbol of national prosperity. Since the early 1980s, its contributions to the national budget had surpassed revenues from income tax, with public opinion perceiving it as crucial towards the country's welfare. CEO Arve Johnsen, then an influential figure within the Norwegian Labour Party, was seen by many as untouchable, even under a conservative government. A previous attempt by Prime Minister Kåre Willoch to limit Statoil's autonomy had failed.

The scandal unfolded alongside a broader financial downturn, worsened by the collapse of Den norske Creditbank, one of the country's largest financial institutions. For many, it became a symbol of a collapsing economic era and an end to the "yuppie age".

== Public reaction ==
Public and media reaction was immediate and intense. Norwegian newspapers dedicated daily front-page coverage to the unfolding disaster, often resorting to visual metaphors and analogies to convey the unimaginable sum of NOK 6 billion. One tabloid, the Dagbladet, equated the amount to enough to buy one AG3 assault rifle for every Norwegian citizen (then a population of 4.5 million). Others translated the figure into public sector equivalents, such as kindergarten places, retirement homes and fighter jets. The coverage ranged from serious financial critique to the outright absurd.

For years afterward, the phrase "one mong" became colloquial for NOK 6 billion.
