= Tikken Manus =

Norwegian resistance member (1914–2010)

Ida Nikoline "Tikken" Manus (née Lindebrække, previously Bernardes; 28 June 1914 – 12 October 2010) was a member of the Norwegian resistance during World War II.

Born Ida Nikoline Lie Lindebrække, she was a daughter of County Governor Gjert Lindebrække (1879–1960) and Ida Bessesen Lie (1881–1944), and a sister of politician Sjur Lindebrække. She was also a niece of writer Bernt Bessesen Lie.

She hailed from Kalfaret in Bergen, and tried different ventures before the Second World War. She worked an office job in England, and attended French classes while socializing in Paris. She returned to England, where she married diplomat George Bernardes, and had a son (George Jr.) in 1939. They moved to Norway, where her husband was a consul in Haugesund. When the Second World War reached Norway on 9 April 1940 with the German invasion, Tikken was in Bergen. Her husband was injured while visiting Åndalsnes, and when he was operated in Sweden, Tikken followed and was hired at the British legation in Stockholm in 1943. Here, she was tasked with coordinating the contact with Norwegian resistance members who had fled German-occupied Norway for neutral Sweden, and the political and military authorities in Great Britain. Her codename was "Tante" ("Aunt").

While working here, she met resistance member Max Manus (1914–1996). After a lengthy process of divorcing her husband, she married Max Manus in March 1947 and took his last name. After the war, Tikken Manus was hired by resistance member Harald Grieg in the publishing house Gyldendal, but eventually joined her husband Max in running a small company in the office machine business. They lived at Landøya in Asker. Her husband died in 1996, and she died in October 2010. In addition to George Jr, the two had the children Max Jr. and Mette.

A book about Tikken Manus was published in February 2009, Tikken Manus. Sabotørenes hemmelige medspiller. In 2008, she was made known to a broader audience when her character was included in the film Max Manus. She was portrayed by actor Agnes Kittelsen.
