= Landøya =

- Island
- Location in Norway
- Coordinates: 59.513242°N 10.302660°E
- Country: Norway
- County: Akershus
- Municipality: Asker
- Time zone: UTC+1 (CET)
  - Summer (DST): UTC+2 (CEST)
- Postal code: 1634

Landøya is an island situated on the north-western part of Asker, in the province of Akershus just outside Oslo, Norway.

The Norwegian figure skating star Sonia Henie lived on Landøya, and one of the roads, the Sonja Henies vei, is named after her. The famous Norwegian World War II heroes and members of the resistance, Max Manus and his wife Tikken Manus, also lived there after the Second World War and until the end of their lives. Max died in 1996, and Tikken died in October 2010.
