= Agnes Kittelsen =

Norwegian actress (born 1980)

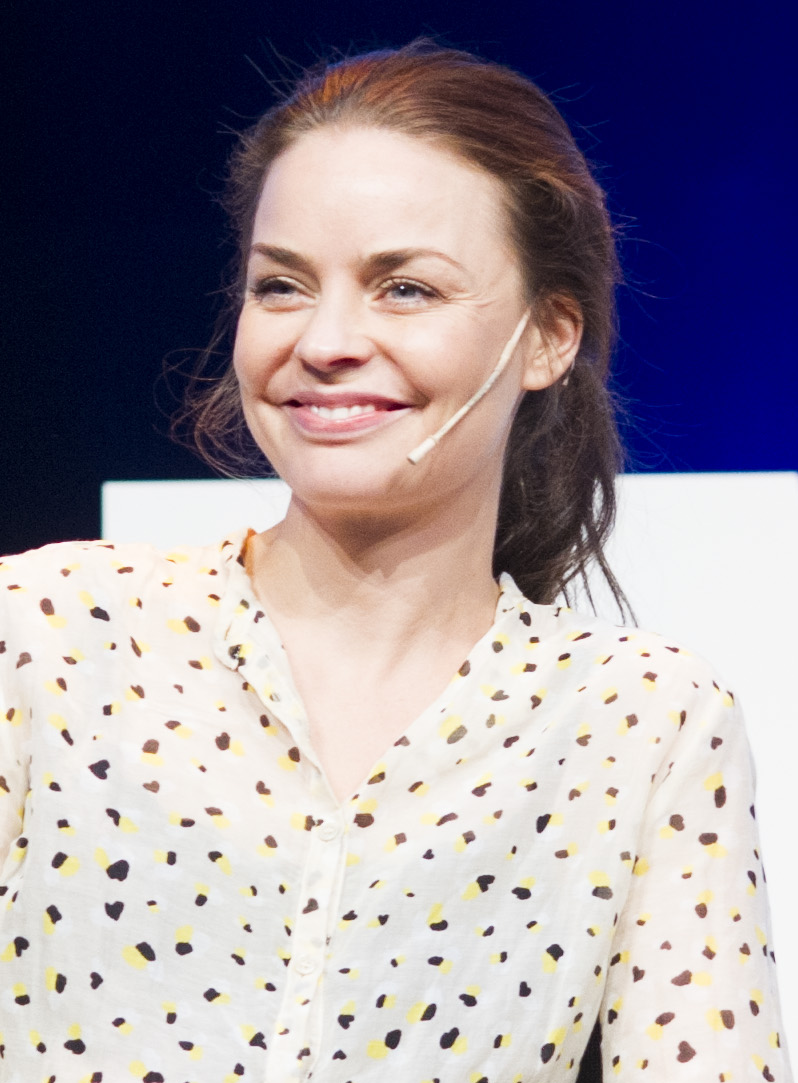
- Born: Agnes Elisabet Hilden Kittelsen; 20 May 1980 (age 45); Kristiansand, Norway
- Occupation: Actress
- Years active: 2004 – present
- Awards: Film: Happy, Happy. Kittelsen’s performance is the linchpin of the film. Winner of the Sundance Grand Jury Prize for World Cinema and the Norwegian selection for the Foreign Language Film Oscar.
- Website: Actorsagent

Agnes Elisabet Hilden Kittelsen (born 20 May 1980) is a Norwegian actress.

== Biography ==
Agnes Kittelsen is known for her role as Anneli in the TV-series Skolen (2004), as the title character's wife Tikken in the 2008 film Max Manus and as Liv Heyerdahl, the wife of Thor Heyerdahl in the film Kon-Tiki. She also starred in the sitcom Dag from 2010 to 2015.

After graduating from the Norwegian National Academy of Theatre in 2003, she worked at Den Nationale Scene from 2004 to 2006, before starting at the National Theatre in 2007.

She played the witch in the Norwegian 2012 movie Reisen til julestjernen and Vivian in then television adaption of the book The Half Brother that was broadcast on NRK in 2013.

From 2019 to 2023, Kittelsen played Hermine Vejle in Exit, a series in 3 seasons that described the decadent lives of 4 men in Oslo's finance elites. It became the most streamed in the history of Norwegian national television.

Kittelsen's mother is Finnish.

== Filmography ==
=== Short films ===
- 2006 : Bagasje : Hilde
- 2006 : Road Movie : Celine
- 2010 : Neglect : Ellinor

=== TV series ===
- 2004–2005 : Skolen : Anneli
- 2005 : Brødrene Dal og mysteriet med Karl XIIs gamasjer : Mette-Mari Dal
- 2008–2009 : Honningfellen : Signe Maria Øye
- 2010–2015 : Dag : Malin Tramell
- 2013 : Halvbroren : Vivian
- 2015 : Hæsjtægg : Vivi
- 2017 : Neste Sommer : Gunnhild
- 2019 : Beforeigners : Marie
- 2019 : Exit : Hermine Veile
- 2019 : Mellem os : Merete
- 2025 : Åremorden : Marion

=== Cinema ===
- 2008 : Max Manus by Joachim Rønning and Espen Sandberg : Tikken Lindebrække
- 2009 : Millénium 3 – Luftslottet som sprängdes by Daniel Alfredson
- 2010 : Happy Happy by Anne Sewitsky : Kaja
- 2012 : Kon-Tiki by Joachim Rønning and Espen Sandberg : Liv Heyerdahl
- 2012 : Reisen til julestjernen by Nils Gaup : Heksa
- 2015 : Prästen i paradiset by Kjell Sundvall : Line
- 2015 : Staying Alive by Charlotte Blom : Marianne
- 2016 : Pyromaniac by Erik Skjoldbjærg : Elsa
- 2018 : En affære by Henrik Martin Dahlsbakken : Henriette
- 2019 : Skammerens datter II: Slangens gave by Ask Hasselbalch : Melussina
- 2019 : Hjelperytteren by Jannicke Systad Jacobsen : Grete Stein
