= Kolbein Lauring =

Norwegian resistance member

Kolbein Widrik Lauring (15 June 1914 – 31 May 1987) was a Norwegian resistance member during World War II.

== Biography ==
He grew up in Ljan (until 1948 a part of Aker) together with later resistance ace Max Manus. The two participated as volunteers on the Finnish side in the Winter War, a war between the Soviet Union and Finland from 1939 to 1940. When Germany invaded and occupied Norway in 1940, Lauring and Manus returned to Norway. They first participated in the Norwegian Campaign, where Lauring was taken prisoner-of-war at Akershus Fortress in the early phase. Lauring could be facing a death penalty, but then Germany released the prisoners-of-war to gain acceptance for their occupation. Lauring and Manus then travelled north together, attempting to reach the Battles of Narvik via Sweden. However, Norway capitulated before they could reach the northern front lines. Instead the two joined the secret resistance movement.

In February 1941 Lauring was arrested by the Nazi authorities for carrying a weapon. He was imprisoned in Åkebergveien from 16 February to 1 March, then in Møllergata 19 until 18 March, then at Åkebergveien until 13 May and Møllergata until 8 September 1942. During his stay in Møllergata 19, he reportedly helped Secret Intelligence Service officer Sverre Midtskau escape (in December 1941) as he managed to copy the door keys belonging to a German guard. On the other hand, he was also reportedly exposed to a provocation attempt by Statspolitiet, as one of their agents were placed in Lauring's cell under the cover of being an arrested resistance activist. Lauring spent a final year at Grini concentration camp, from 8 September 1942 to 9 October 1943, before being released. Max Manus has later referred to his release as a "miraculous mistake" by the Germans. (Note: Quote by Manus: Ved en eller annen mirakuløs feiltagelse ble han så sluppet fri. In English: "Then, by some miraculous mistake he was released." Reference: M. Manus, Aftenposten, 1984.) Lauring then rejoined the resistance fight, meeting up with Max Manus who had arrived from the United Kingdom by parachute a few days earlier. Among others, he helped in ship sabotage (Operation Bundle).

Another major incident took place on 4 April 1945, when his apartment at Ljan was surrounded by Wehrmacht. This was a part of the German exposure of Operation Derby. There was a shoot-out, but Lauring managed to escape to a safe house. During the shoot-out Kolbein's wife Kari telephoned Max Manus and other associated people about the imminent crackdown, saving many lives. From their branch of the resistance, only Roy Nielsen and Olav Ringdal were caught and shot. Kari Lauring was taken prisoner in Grini for the rest of World War II, but was later decorated with the British King's Medal for Courage in the Cause of Freedom. Kolbein Lauring was decorated with the St. Olav's Medal With Oak Branch. Also, when Crown Prince Olav of Norway returned from exile after the war, Lauring served as his bodyguard for a period. He died in 1987, followed by his wife in 1993.

In 2008, Kolbein Lauring was made famous to a broader audience when his character was included in the film Max Manus. He was portrayed by actor Christian Rubeck.
