= Kabus 22 =

2006 video game

- Kabus 22 title screen
- Developer: Son Işık Ltd.
- Publishers: TUR: Vestel; Other: Merscom
- Designers: Yasin Demirden; Yakup Demirden
- Engine: Gamestudio
- Platform: Windows
- Release: TUR: 25 December 2006; POL: 24 August 2007; RU: 19 October 2007; CZ: 1 November 2007; DE: 7 March 2008
- Genre: Survival horror
- Mode: Single-player

Kabus 22 is a 2006 survival horror video game released for Microsoft Windows. Set in the Kadıköy district in Istanbul, the game is notable for being one of the earliest commercially-sold video games developed in Turkey. The game was also distributed under the names Fearzone Strefa 22, Zona 22 and Sektor 22 in other countries. In 2019, the game was released as freeware.

== Plot ==
In the game, the player has three characters to control; the Turkish soldier Demir, his girlfriend Ebru and the mysterious Inzar. These characters have to fight against a despotic religious order and creatures named Maduns in an alternate near future.

== Development ==
Kabus 22 was developed by Son Işık, a Turkish video game studio founded in 2004 by a small team of young developers. Inspired by similar survival-horror games such as Resident Evil, they began working on Kabus 22 the same year.

The game's development took three years and was rife with difficulties. The team had little to no experience in game development and had to work within a limited budget and with limited internet access. At the time, the Turkish tax code did not recognize video games as a distinct product category, meaning the developers could not submit a tax stamp application and legally sell the game in Turkey. The team have been suggested to categorize the game as a film instead, that way they could obtain a tax stamp without legislative intervention.

Since no game publishers existed in Turkey at the time, the game was distributed by Vestel, a Turkish appliance store chain. Kabus 22 was released in Turkey on Christmas day 2006. Over the following years it received additional international releases, mostly in Eastern Europe and Russia.

In 2019, after rebranding to Motion Blur, the original development studio released the game for free on their YouTube channel.

== Promotion ==
K22: Demolition Day is a free FPS/arcade minigame. It is a promotion for Kabus 22. The minigame was released on 21 October 2007. A player can either create an account and try to beat other players' records, or can play offline.

== Reception ==
The game was released to mixed reception, scoring an average of 51% based on 10 reviews.
