= Max Manus: Man of War =

2008 Norwegian biographical war film

Max Manus
- Theatrical release poster
- Directed by: Joachim Rønning; Espen Sandberg
- Written by: Thomas Nordseth-Tiller
- Produced by: Sveinung Golimo; John M. Jacobsen
- Starring: Aksel Hennie; Nicolai Cleve Broch; Agnes Kittelsen; Ken Duken; Petter Næss
- Cinematography: Geir Hartly Andreassen
- Edited by: Anders Refn
- Music by: Trond Bjerknes
- Release date: 19 December 2008
- Running time: 118 minutes
- Country: Norway
- Language: Norwegian
- Budget: US$5.9 million
- Box office: US$15.3 million

Max Manus: Man of War (Norwegian: Max Manus) is a 2008 Norwegian biographical war film directed by Joachim Rønning and Espen Sandberg, based on the real events of the life of resistance fighter Max Manus. The story follows Manus (Aksel Hennie) from the Winter War against the Soviet Union, through the outbreak of World War II and the occupation of Norway by Nazi Germany until peacetime in 1945. The film is based on Max Manus's own books Det vil helst gå godt and Det blir alvor, as well as other accounts and historical documentation. The film stays largely historically accurate, but omits some events, and moves some of the supporting characters around to show them taking part in events in place of others. The production included around 1,800 extras and 2,000 workers behind the cameras.

The film's premiere was attended by King Harald V, "Tikken" Manus, Gunnar Sønsteby along with other notable individuals. Reception from critics was largely positive. Max Manus also sparked a public debate about the role of the Norwegian resistance movement during the German occupation.

== Plot ==
After fighting the Soviets as a volunteer during the Winter War in Finland, Max Manus, haunted by his experiences, returns to Norway, finding it occupied by the Nazis. He joins with the Norwegian resistance movement in their fight against the Germans, producing illegal propaganda, but his cell is soon detected and he is arrested after jumping out a window. After being hospitalised, he manages to escape to Scotland, where he receives British Commando training in sabotage and disinformation. Returning to Norway with his friend Gregers Gram, his first mission is an attack on German supply ships. He is spectacularly successful, and becomes a special target for the local Gestapo chief Siegfried Fehmer. Manus, however, avoids capture, and with Gram and Gunnar Sønsteby forms the so-called "Oslo Gang" and along with others, receives a medal from the Norwegian king.

Stockholm in neutral Sweden becomes a meeting point for Norwegians in allied military service. Here Gram introduces Manus to "Tikken", a married woman who works as a Norwegian contact for the British consulate, and the two develop a relationship. As the war becomes more brutal, many of Manus' friends lose their lives, and he starts to blame himself for being the survivor. On 16 January 1945 he and Roy Nielsen succeed in planting limpet mines, which sank the cargo ship Donau the next day. After the war, at a loss due to his poor prospects, he meets an imprisoned Fehmer and realises that everyone is just a victim of the meaninglessness of war.

== Cast ==
- Aksel Hennie as Max Manus
- Agnes Kittelsen as Ida Nikoline "Tikken" Lindebrække
- Nicolai Cleve Broch as Gregers Gram
- Petter Næss as Captain Martin Linge
- Kyrre Haugen Sydness as Jens Christian Hauge
- Knut Joner as Gunnar Sønsteby
- Viktoria Winge as Solveig Johnsrud
- Christian Rubeck as Kolbein Lauring
- Mats Eldøen as Edvard Tallaksen
- Ken Duken as Hauptsturmführer Siegfried Fehmer
- Stig Henrik Hoff as Police Captain Eilertsen
- Pål Sverre Hagen as Roy Nielsen
- Jakob Oftebro as Lars Emil Erichsen
- Ron Donachie as Colonel John Skinner Wilson
- Oliver Stokowski as Oberscharführer Karl Höhler

== Production ==
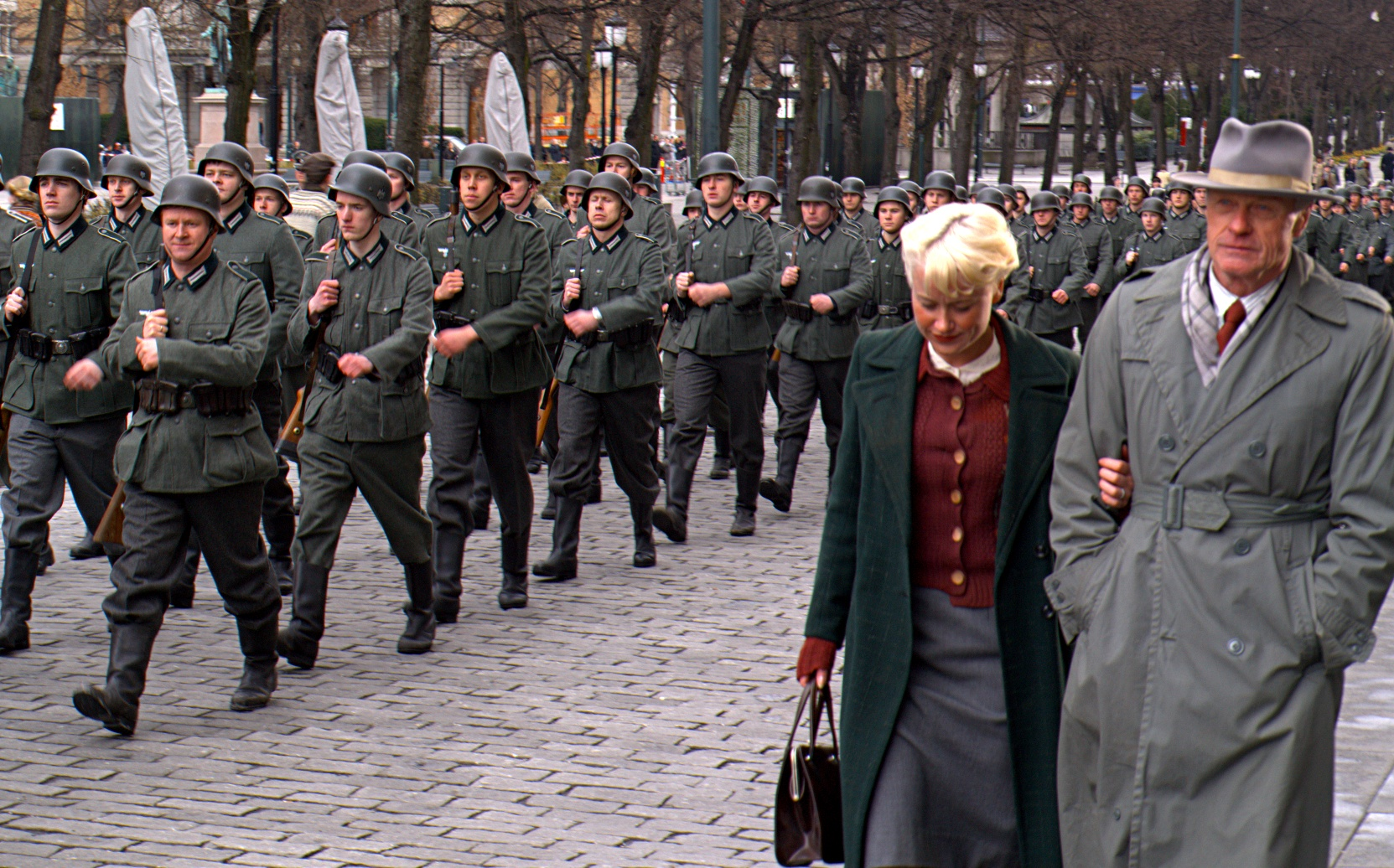
Extras in German uniforms marching through the streets of Oslo during the filming of Max Manus.

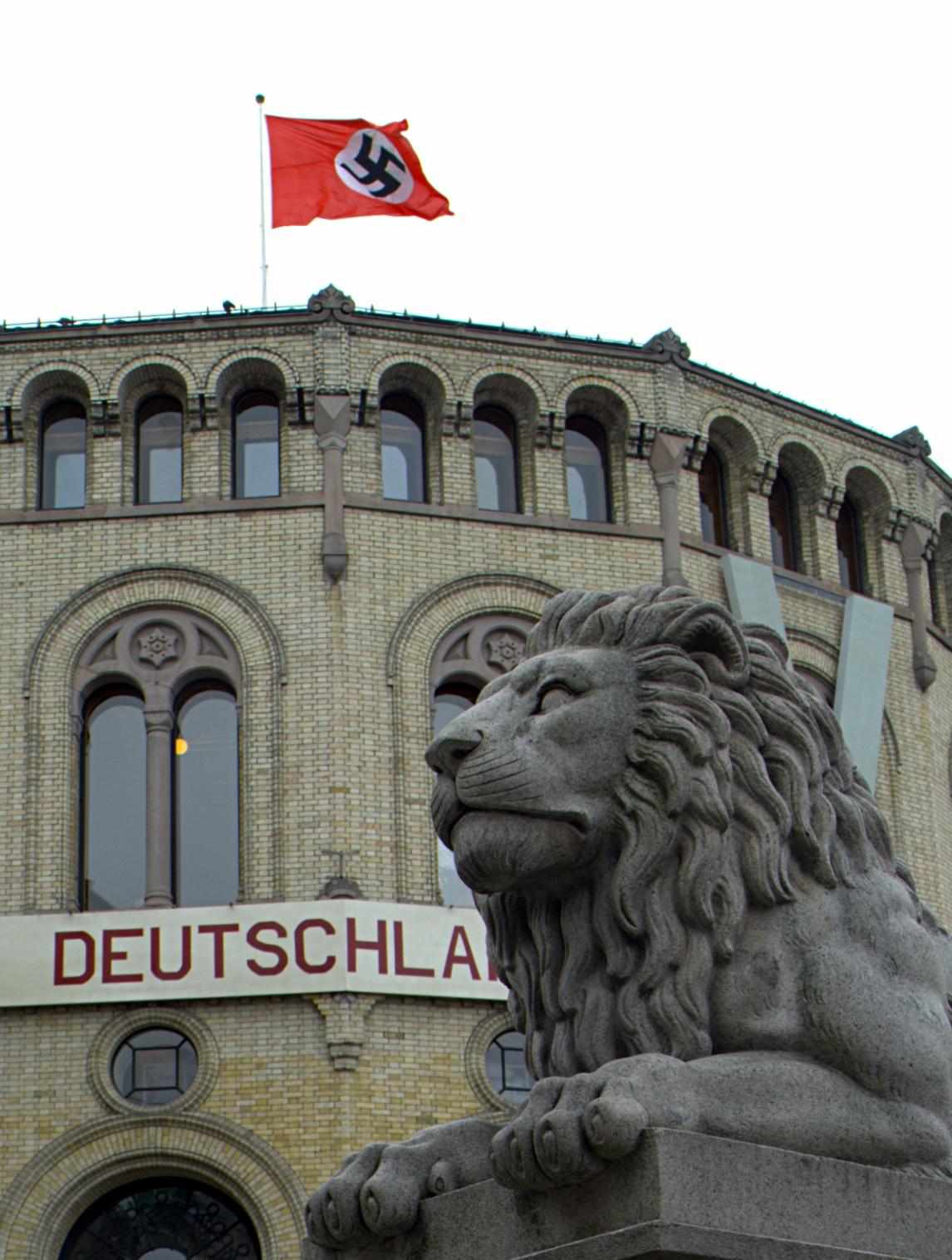
The Nazi-German flag flying over the Parliament of Norway Building during the film production.

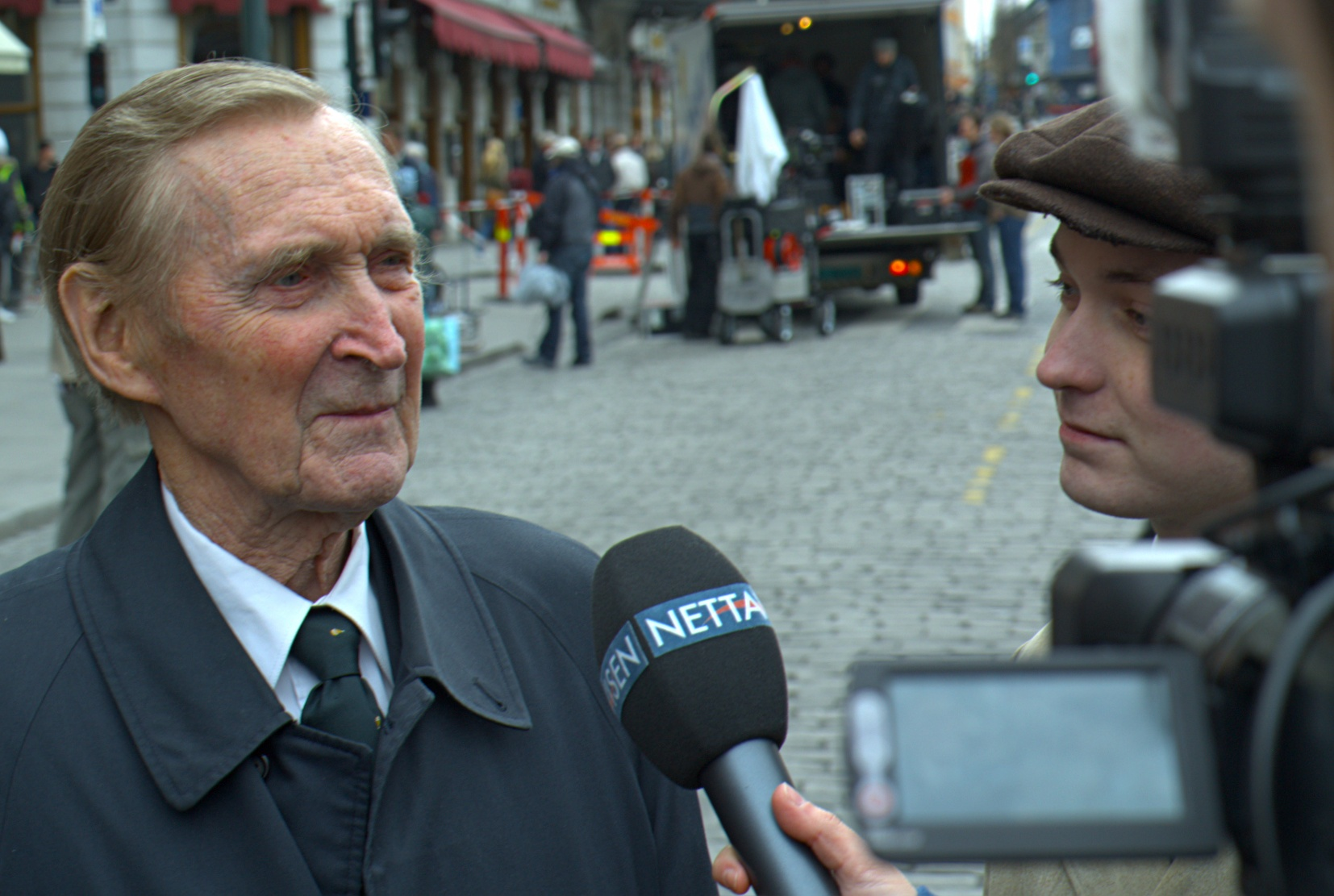
Gunnar Sønsteby and Knut Joner being interviewed by Nettavisen on location in Oslo. Sønsteby said that when he first saw Joner he thought "you look like an insignificant dope. You look just like me".

The film received support from the Norwegian Film Fund on 3 December 2007, and filming started in February 2008. With a budget of over 50 million kr, the production was enormous by Norwegian standards. Around 1,800 extras were involved, and around 2,000 people worked behind the camera. To produce a realistic effect, parts of Oslo were transformed into an early–1940s look, a process that included flying the flag of Nazi Germany from the roof of the parliament building, for the first time in over 60 years. Some large sets from Stockholm, Sweden, are sequences from the Swedish film 1939 which was released in 1989.

== Historical debate ==
In the lead-up to the film's premiere, a concern was raised by the writer Erling Fossen that the story presented was a glorification of reality. Fossen claimed that the effort of the Norwegian resistance movement during the war was inefficient, irresponsible, and in some cases directly counter-productive. The general response from academic historians was that, even though a critical debate about the role of the resistance movement was necessary, Fossen's arguments were overstated and largely based on ignorance. Historian Lars Borgersrud has expressed stern criticism of the film's lack of adherence to history. For instance, the film portrays Manus fighting in the Winter War, a war in which Borgersrud claims Manus did not see action at all, despite Max Manus detailing this in his own books. Borgersrud accused Norway's Resistance Museum, which was assisting the film makers in a consultancy capacity, of distorting history. Historian and director at Norway's Resistance Museum, Arnfinn Moland rejected Borgersrud's accusations, stating that there is ample evidence that Manus endured heavy artillery bombardment and machine gun fire in Finland and that this affected him for the rest of his life, including dead and wounded in their unit.

== Reception ==
The premiere of Max Manus was an elaborate event, attended by King Harald V as well as 90-year-old Gunnar Sønsteby, one of the resistance fighters portrayed in the film. The King, who himself was old enough to have experienced World War II, was allegedly moved to tears by the film. Both Sønsteby—the only remaining member of Manus' group—and Max Manus' widow, Tikken Manus appreciated the authenticity of the film. Among the other guests were Minister of Defence Anne-Grete Strøm-Erichsen and Minister of Culture Trond Giske.

Per Haddal, writing for the newspaper Aftenposten, gave the film four out of six points. He commended Hennie's effort as Manus, as well as the direction and the high production values. At the same time he found the format of the film overly traditional and lacking in originality. Meanwhile, Norwegian Broadcasting Corporation's Einar Guldvog Staalesen gave the film five points. He pointed out a few glitches in the realism, but generally found the film credible and watchable. Eirik Alver of Dagbladet gave five out of six points and praised the film's technical qualities and Hennie's acting. However, he felt the film was very traditional in its expression, pretending to be a Hollywood production.

Five out of six points were also awarded by Norway's largest newspaper VG and veteran film critic Jon Selås, calling it a gripping portrait "that is a reminder to new generations of the price that was paid to make the Norway we know today". Mode Steinkjer, in the paper Dagsavisen, gave praise to Aksel Hennie for his portraiture of the "adventurer" Max Manus. Geir Jardar Olsen, writing for the website of the largest commercial TV station TV2 called it "one of the best Norwegian films ever made", giving the film six out of six points. He especially praised the film for its credible and warm portrayal of the relationship between Manus and his fellow saboteurs, as well as his romance with future wife Tikken.

The larger papers based outside of Oslo were harder in their critique. They were generally impressed by the film's production values, but found it lacking in nuances in its depiction of the resistance. Many of them compared Max Manus to the Danish film Flammen og Citronen, a film about the Danish resistance released the same year. In Bergens Tidende, critic Astrid Kolbjørnsen gives praise to the film's ending and overall good intentions, but found the acting uneven and the dialogue artificial. Her biggest accusation was that "Max Manus" lacked nuances, with no moral dilemmas. In an interview with the paper's television channel, she drew the comparison to Flammen og Citronen, calling the latter a better and more complex film. Terje Eidsvåg of the Trondheim paper Adresseavisa called Hennie's portrayal of Max Manus "a Norwegian Rambo", and found the film "black and white" with "no moral gray areas", falling short to Flammen og Citronen as well as the Dutch Black Book. Stavanger Aftenblad's critic, Kristin Ålen, praised "Max Manus" acting and the film's ending, but expressed a need for a film that dares to question the liquidations conducted by the Norwegian resistance, and like her colleagues she drew parallels to Flammen og Citronen. These three newspapers awarded four, four and five points respectively.

The film was seen by around 140,500 people on its opening weekend, a national record for a Norwegian film. The previous record of 101,564 was set earlier the same year by the horror film Cold Prey 2. The film remained popular through its second week. During the Christmas weekend—traditionally a period of many high-profile premières—Max Manus was seen by 133,923 people, which corresponded to 55% of all cinema visitors. This was 100,000 more visitors than the next film on the list—Yes Man starring Jim Carrey. In the first two weeks the film has been seen by over 317,000 people. By 27 December 2009, 1,161,855 tickets had been sold.

In 2009 Max Manus became the first Norwegian film ever to be chosen for a gala viewing at the Toronto International Film Festival in Toronto, Ontario. The Toronto presentation would be the film's international premiere.

=== 2009 Amanda Awards ===
With seven Amanda Awards, Max Manus became the largest Amanda winner at the 2009 Norwegian International Film Festival:

- The People's Amanda - directors Espen Sandberg and Joachim Rønning, producers John M. Jacobsen and Sveinung Golimo for Filmkameratene AS
- Best Norwegian Film in Theatrical Release - producers John M. Jacobsen and Sveinung Golimo for Filmkameratene AS
- Best Actor - Aksel Hennie
- Best Actress in a Supporting Role - Agnes Kittelsen
- Best Screenplay - Thomas Nordseth-Tiller
- Best Cinematography - Geir Hartly Andreassen
- Best Sound Design - Baard Haugan Ingebretsen and Tormod Ringnes

== Copyright infringement case ==
An illegal copy of the film appeared on file sharing networks less than two weeks after release. According to producer John M. Jacobsen, the recording appeared to have been made in an empty theater, which raised suspicion that a projectionist may have been involved. The matter was reported to the police for investigation.
