= Yama Wolasmal =

Afghan-born Norwegian news anchor (born 1982)

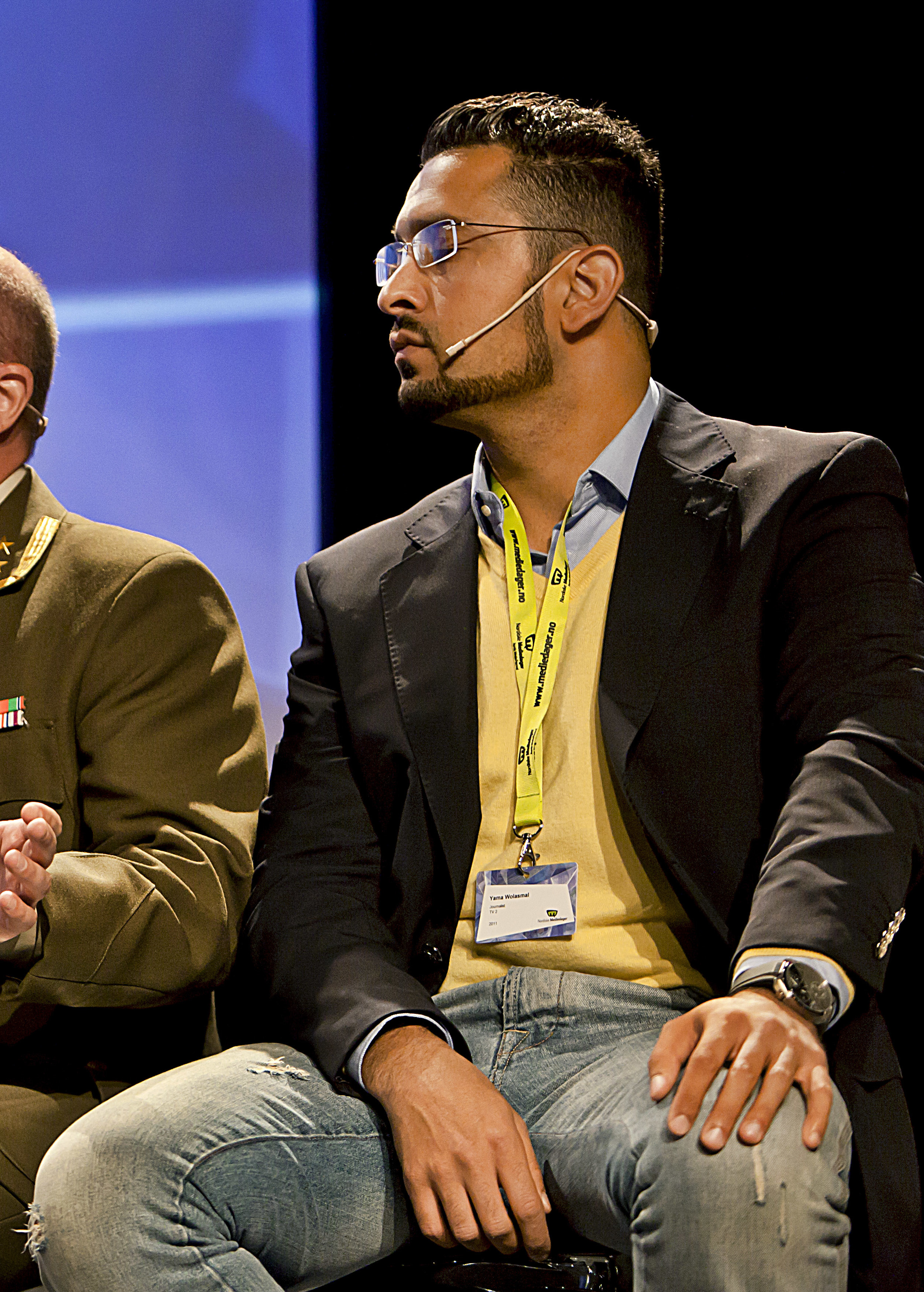
- Wolasmal in 2011
- Born: 28 November 1982 (age 43); Kabul, Afghanistan
- Occupation: News anchor
- Known for: Anchor of Norway's main television news program, Dagsrevyen

Yama Wolassmal (born 28 November 1982) is an Afghan-Norwegian news anchor.

== Early life ==
Yama Wolasmal was born in Kabul. His family fled to Pakistan when he was three months old, and immigrated to Norway as refugees a few years later. He grew up in the Grünerløkka and Bjørndal neighborhoods of Oslo. Wolasmal had journalistic assignments in Dagbladet and TV 2, and was also a correspondent in Afghanistan. When employed by TV 2 he became moderator of the debate show Underhuset.

== Career ==
In November 2017, Wolasmal was hired as anchor of Norway's main television news program, Dagsrevyen. In 2020 he was appointed as foreign correspondent for NRK in the Middle East, based in Beirut. In April 2024, he conducted an interview with Israeli government spokesperson David Mencer which garnered worldwide attention. In the interview, Wolasmal interrogated the interviewee about charges of Israeli war crimes and the Gaza genocide.

Prior to the interview with Mencer, Wolasmal conducted similar high-profile interviews with Hamas leader Osama Hamdan and NATO Secretary General Jens Stoltenberg. In its coverage of his work, Nettavisen described him as "the best foreign correspondent Norway has had".

== Awards and honours ==
- 2016 – Riksmålsforbundets TV-pris for outstanding language use.
- 2023 – Årets medienavn (Media Name of the Year), awarded by the magazine Kampanje for his journalism and reporting from the Middle East.
- 2024 – Internasjonal Reporter-prisen, Ingrid Aunes minnepris and NÆ!-prisen for his reporting and interviews (multiple awards year).
- 2025 – Erik Byes minnepris (Erik Bye Memorial Prize), honoring his work as a foreign correspondent in conflict areas.
