= Erik Hivju =

Norwegian actor (born 1947)

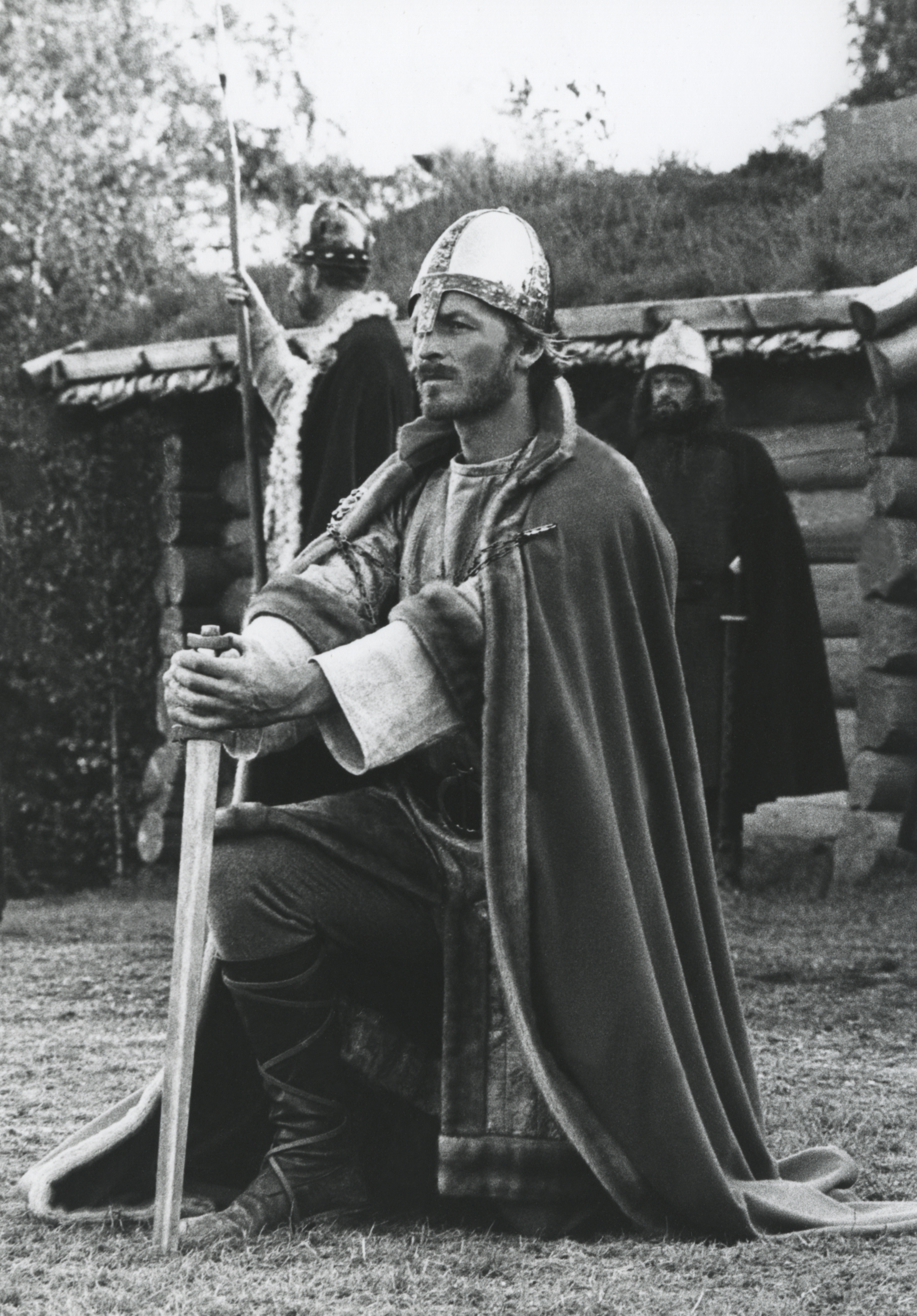
- Born: 24 September 1947
- Occupation: Actor
- Children: Kristofer Hivju

Erik Hivju (born 24 September 1947) is a Norwegian actor. Hivju has appeared in over a dozen television series, as well as several films. He is the father of the Norwegian actor Kristofer Hivju.

Educated at the Norwegian National Academy of Theatre from 1968 to 1971, he has been affiliated with Nationaltheatret since 1968, where he has performed a number of major and minor roles, including in several plays by Henrik Ibsen and other classics.

Erik Hivju is the son of actress Inger Worren and the father of actor Kristofer Hivju.

Hivju is also a widely used audiobook narrator. Among other works, he has narrated the Bjørn Beltø novel series by Tom Egeland and The Idiot by Fyodor Dostoevsky, in which he also played the role of Rogozhin in Oslo Nye Teater's 1996 stage production. He has also narrated books by authors Dan Brown and Arto Paasilinna.

== Selected filmography ==
- Lukket avdeling (1972)
- Operasjon Cobra (1978)
- Little Ida (1981)
- Krypskyttere (1982)
- The King's Choice (2016)
- Nr 24 (2024)

== Dubbing ==
- The Black Cauldron - The Horned King
- A Bug's Life - Hopper
- Tarzan - Kerchak
