= Motion Blur =

Video game studio

Motion Blur Game Studio
- Company type: Private
- Industry: Video games
- Founded: 2004; 22 years ago
- Headquarters: Ataşehir, Istanbul, Turkey
- Website: motionblur.com

Motion Blur or Motion Blur Game Studio (Turkish: Motion Blur Oyun Stüdyosu) is a computer game developer based in Ataşehir, Istanbul, Turkey. It was founded in 2004. Kabus 22 on sale worldwide has produced the first Turkish game, In 2013, it changed its title and became Motion Blur. Produced Kabus 22, the first Turkish game to be sold worldwide.

== Developed games ==
- Kabus 22 (PC, 2006)
- Space Cake (Mobile, 2014)
- Black State [TBA]
