= Sally Olsen (social worker) =

American missionary

- Born: 10 April 1912; Bergen, Norway
- Died: 12 April 2006 (aged 94)
- Occupations: social worker and missionary

Sally Olsen (10 April 1912 – 12 April 2006) was a Norwegian-born American social worker and missionary. She was a pioneer of evangelical and social work for criminals and for orphans and neglected children in San Juan, Puerto Rico,

== Biography ==
Sally Olsen was born in Bergen, Norway. She was the eldest of four girls. Her father died when she was five years old. In 1929, at age seventeen, Olsen and her family moved to the United States, where they first settled in Brooklyn, New York. Olsen attended the Bible school of Philadelphia Church in the Andersonville neighborhood of Chicago where she trained for the ministry and was ordained a minister.

Olsen was a pioneer in social work for criminals in San Juan, Puerto Ricoas well as pioneering an orphanage in Guaynabo.Her tireless missionary devotion lead to a legacy of countless children that were left at her doors to create the Orphanage 'The Rose of Sharon". In 1952, she founded Sarons Rose, a center mission for children with one or both parents in prison, or single parents that wanted a better life for a child they could not care for.

Many of these children grew up to become, Teachers, Lawyers, Engineers, Doctors. The locals in the area knew her, loved her, respected her and also knew her as "God's Angel of Children', Her orphanage was respected and loved by the locals who knew about the mission she had established.It became a safe haven for many She also served unofficially in the role of an unofficial prison chaplain, in San Juan where she was nicknamed the Angel of Prisoners, and updated those whose children were in her care. Her ministry extended in using her social work skills in rehabilitation of those in prison so they could be reunited with their children once released (El Angel de los Presos). Her life was chronicled by Max Manus in 1975 and by E. Mentzen in 1987.
