= Trond Bakkevig =

Norwegian priest

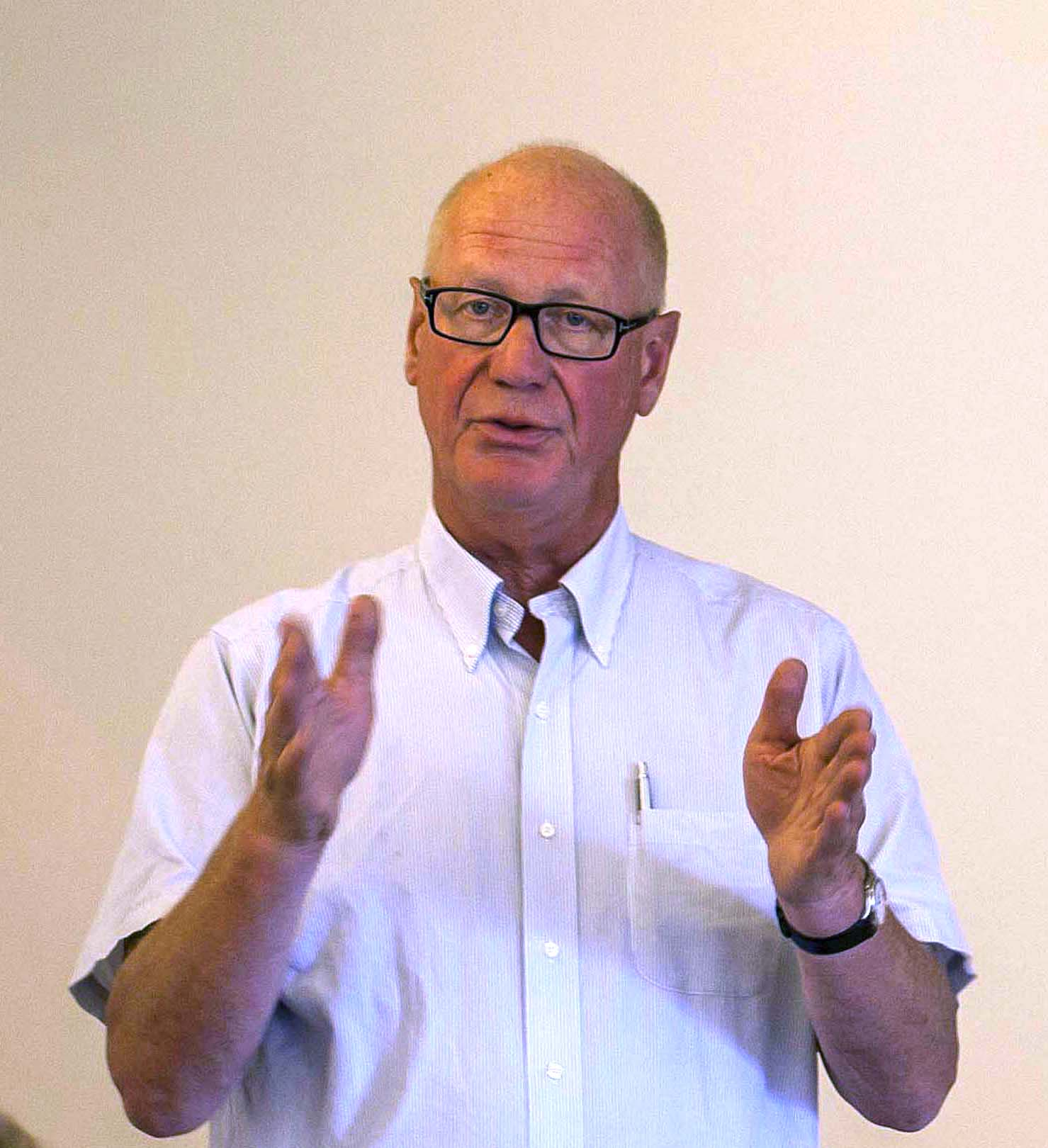
- Bakkevig in 2012
- Born: 22 November 1948 (age 77); Oslo, Norway
- Occupations: priest and organizational leader
- Awards: Gunnar Sønsteby Prize (2016)

Trond Bakkevig (born 22 November 1948) is a Norwegian priest and organizational leader, an active participant in contemporary debate.

He was born in Oslo, and graduated in theology with the thesis Ordningsteologi og atomvåpen in 1984. He served as secretary general of Mellomkirkelig råd from 1984 to 1993. He was awarded the Gunnar Sønsteby Prize in 2016.
