= Oslogjengen =

Norwegian military resistance unit of WWII

Oslogjengen (lit. The Oslo Gang, also called Kompani Linge's Oslo Detachment) was a sabotage group operating in Oslo from May 1944 to May 1945, during the last year of the occupation of Norway by Nazi Germany. The group had its basis in both the British Special Operations Executive and the Norwegian Milorg, was coordinated by Gunnar Sønsteby, and had around ten members. It was the dominant sabotage group in Oslo between May and September 1944, when they performed a series of successful sabotage operations.

== Background ==
In May 1944 the Nazi regime announced the call up of all men born in 1921, 1922 and 1923 to "national labour duty". Earlier in 1944 a secret memorandum (Latin: pro memoria (PM)) from "Minister of Justice" Sverre Riisnæs, proposing to send 75,000 young Norwegians to the German-Soviet war front, had been revealed and published by the underground press. The resistance movement decided to oppose these plans by all available means.

== Sabotage operations against the labour duty ==
The first sabotages were directed against Arbeidstjenesten, the registration of young people for labour duty: Destruction of a machinery for sorting registration cards, 18 May 1944 and 17 June 1944, and the demolition of the registration office at Akersgaten 55 in Oslo. Over the summer, thousands of young people left their homes, hiding in the forests, to avoid the call-up. When the Nazi authorities discovered this, they tried to prevent their food supplies by denying them ration cards. As a counter-action Oslogjengen performed a hold-up against a truck with ration cards in August 1944, securing the truck-load of cards.

== Other operations ==
To paralyse the German production of explosives, an operation against two sulphur acid factories (Norsk Svovelsyrefabrikk and Lysaker kemiske Fabrik A/S) was performed in June 1944. In August 1944 an operation against a bus garage resulted in the destruction of 25 Messerschmitt fighters and 150 airplane motors. A locomotive for the Thamshavn railway, which had previously been damaged and sent to Oslo for repair, was damaged again in an operation against Skabo Jernbanevognfabrikk in September 1944. Other operations were directed against Raufoss Ammunisjonsfabrikk and Kongsberg Våpenfabrikk, oil storage facilities, and a large supply of stored ball bearings. Another notable sabotage by the Oslogjengen members Max Manus and Roy Nielsen happened on or shortly before January 16th, The Oslogjengen placed 10 limpet mines underwater on the hull of the SS Donau (1929), a German transport ship. The mines were set to explode once the ship had reached the sea, but departure was delayed and it was sunk in Oslofjord, Norway.

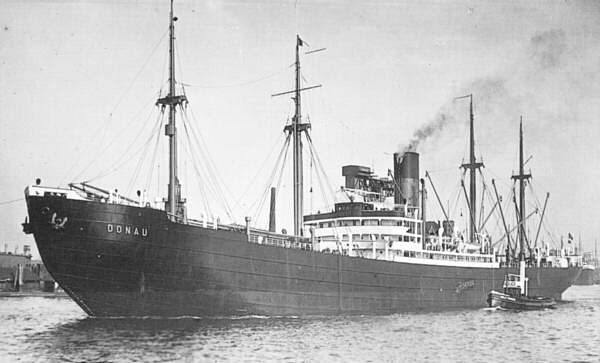
The SS Donau (1929-1945)

== Towards the end of the war ==
In May 1945 Oslogjengen performed an operation to secure the files in the Ministry of Justice and Police from destruction. After the war, members of the group served as guards for Crown Prince Olav when he returned from exile on 13 May 1945, and also as guards for King Haakon when he arrived in June 1945.

== Members ==
Oslogjengen had about ten members, coordinated by Gunnar Sønsteby. Two of the group members, Gregers Gram and Edvard Tallaksen, were shot by the Germans in November 1944, and Roy Nielsen was also killed by the Germans. Other group members were Birger Rasmussen, Andreas Aubert, William Houlder, Per Mørland and Henrik Hop, and occasionally Max Manus. The group was eventually reinforced with the two Linge agents Arthur Pevik and Viggo Axelssen.
