= Andreas Aubert (resistance member) =

Norwegian resistance member

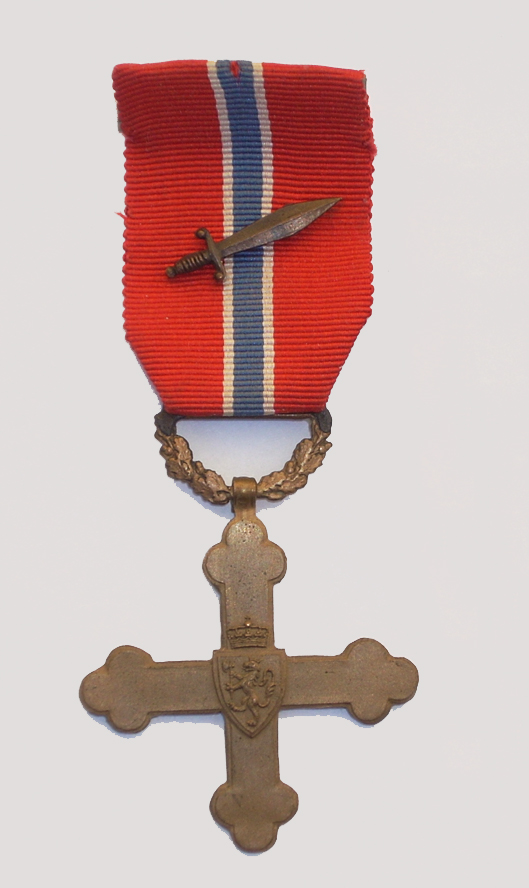
War Cross with sword

Andreas Aubert (3 August 1910 – 11 May 1956) was a Norwegian resistance member during the Second World War. He joined Norwegian Independent Company 1 in 1942 where he later became an ensign.

Aubert was born in Oslo. His older brother, Kristian Aubert (1909-1942), was also an active member of the resistance during the war but was captured by the Gestapo and died from torture in 1942.

Aubert soon became one of the key members of the sabotage group Oslogjengen, which was under the command of Gunnar Sønsteby. Due to his leadership skills, he was often chosen to perform the most demanding missions carried out by the group. In early May 1945 Aubert among other members of Oslogjengen secured the archives in the Department of Justice, which revealed the actions the Nazis in Norway during the war.

When the Norwegian royal family returned to Norway after the war, Aubert served as a bodyguard. He received the War Cross with sword, St. Olav's Medal With Oak Branch and the H. M. The King's Commemorative Medal with bar 1940-1945.

After the war Aubert lived a restless and tense life. He died in Oslo in 1956 at the age of 45 and is buried at the Vestre gravlund cemetery.

== Sources ==
- Gjems-Onstad, Erik (1995) Krigskorset og St. Olavsmedaljen med ekegren (Oslo: Grøndahl Dreyer) ISBN 82-504-2190-6
