= Federation of Norwegian Industries (1919–1989) =

Employers' organisation in Norway

The Federation of Norwegian Industries (Norwegian: Norges Industriforbund, NI) was an employers' organisation in Norway. It existed between 1919 and 1989, and was one of the main organisations in the field. In 1989 it became a part of the Confederation of Norwegian Enterprise through a merger.
