= Edvard Tallaksen =

Norwegian resistance fighter (1918–1944)

Johan Edvard Tallaksen
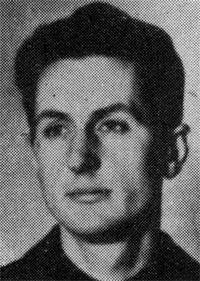
- Edvard Tallaksen
- Born: 17 August 1918
- Died: 29 November 1944 (aged 26)
- Military career
- Allegiance: Norway
- Branch: Norwegian Army
- Service years: 1940–1944
- Rank: Ensign
- Unit: Special Operations Executive: Norwegian Independent Company 1
- Awards: War Cross with sword St. Olav's Medal With Oak Branch; Norwegian War Medal; Military Cross & Bar

Johan Edvard Tallaksen MC & Bar (17 August 1918 – 29 November 1944) was a Norwegian resistance member during World War II, serving as an ensign in the Oslo Gang and Norwegian Independent Company 1.

== Early life ==
Tallaksen grew up with an older brother, Leo Tallaksen, and a sister, Kaia. After graduation from Kristiansand Cathedral School, he studied in Germany where he acquired fluent German. He became a corporal in 1936 after having completed mandatory military service.

== World War II ==
When Germany attacked Norway, Tallaksen fought in Southern-Norway. When Norway was occupied, Tallaksen and five friends sailed across the North Sea to England to join Norwegian Independent Company 1.

After receiving training in Scotland, he parachuted over Norway, together with his companions Birger Rasmussen and Armand Trønnes, on 12 November 1943.

On 21 November, they accomplished "Operating Company", where five generators at Arendal Smelters were blown up; nobody was killed during the sabotage mission. For this achievement, Tallaksen and Rasmussen received the Military Cross, while Trønnes received the Military Medal. After lying low for two weeks - hiding from the Germans - Tallaksen and his companions walked the whole way to Oslo, where they joined "Operation Goldfinch", which consisted of training Milorg personnel.

From the summer of 1944 on, Tallaksen was associated with the Oslo Gang. He took part in several sabotage missions, including the sabotage against the Labour Service, the bombing of an important locomotive on the Thamshavn Line, and the bursting of the oil bearing on Sørenga, which destroyed 200,000 litres of oil.

== Death ==
On Monday 13 November 1944, Tallaksen and his companion Gregers Gram went to Plasskafeen at Olaf Ryes Plass, where they were supposed to meet some German deserters. Gram worked with "Operation Derby" to accomplish psychological warfare by spreading black propaganda; he thought he could use these deserters in his work. However, both Gram and Tallaksen were led into a trap. The "deserters" turned out to be provocateurs; the meeting was staged at Victoria Terrasse, the headquarters of the Gestapo.

It all ended with a shootout, where Gram was killed and Tallaksen was shot in the jaw. After two weeks at Aker Hospital, he was transferred to Akershus Fortress, where he committed suicide on 29 November 1944 to avoid betraying his comrades in Oslogjengen.

== Post-war ==
Tallaksen's body was cremated and buried at Kristiansand Cemetery after the war.

== Honours and awards ==
In 1947, Tallaksen was posthumously awarded the highest Norwegian military award, the War Cross with sword. In addition to the Military Cross and Bar, after participating in Operation Company he also received St. Olav's Medal With Oak Branch and the Norwegian War Medal.

In 2008, Edvard Tallaksen was made known to a broader audience when his character was included in the film Max Manus, portrayed by the actor Mats Eldøen.
