= Max Manus =

Norwegian resistance fighter (1914–1996)

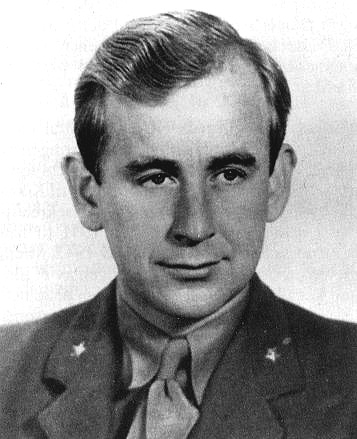
- Born: 9 December 1914; Bergen, Norway
- Died: 20 September 1996 (aged 81); Bærum, Norway
- Spouse: Ida Nikoline Lie Lindebrække (m. 1947)
- Relatives: Johan Magnussen Juan Manus (father), Gerda Kiørup (mother), Pia Manus (sister)
- Military career
- Allegiance: Norway
- Service years: 1940–1945
- Rank: Lieutenant
- Units: Norwegian resistance movement Norwegian Independent Company 1 PWE; SOE
- Conflicts: Winter War; World War II
- Awards: (United Kingdom) Distinguished Service Order (United Kingdom) Military Cross and Bar (United States) Medal of Freedom with silver palm (Norway) Defence Medal (Norway) War Cross with two swords (Finland) Winter War Participation Medal; Various American/Polish/Italian awards
- Other work: Shop assistant, sailor, author, businessman and personal protection officer

Maximo Guillermo Manus DSO, MC & Bar (9 December 1914 – 20 September 1996) was a Norwegian resistance fighter during World War II, specialising in sabotage in occupied Norway. After the war he wrote several books about his adventures and started the successful office supply company Max Manus AS.

== Early life ==
Manus was born in Bergen, Norway in 1914, to a Norwegian father and a Danish mother. His father's name was originally Johan Magnussen, but he changed his name to Juan Manus after living several years in foreign (mainly Spanish-speaking) countries.

== Career ==
After many years of extensive travelling, Manus returned to Scandinavia before the outbreak of World War II, upon which he soon joined up with the Norwegian Army and went to fight in a volunteer detachment with the Finns against the Soviets in the Winter War (1939–1940). Manus returned to Norway upon hearing the news of the German invasion on 9 April 1940. He fought during the Norwegian campaign, after which he decided to return to Oslo and work underground against the occupiers, both organising a resistance movement, illegal public propaganda and the manufacture of weaponry. He and his comrades tried to assassinate Himmler and Goebbels when they visited Oslo.

His work was effective, and he soon became a wanted man by the Gestapo. He was eventually captured and was injured trying to escape. He had to be treated in the main Oslo hospital. The doctor at the hospital lied to the Gestapo officers, saying Manus needed treatment for a broken back, an injured shoulder and a serious concussion. The truth, however, was that he was only bruised and had a light concussion. After 27 days, with the aid of a nurse, he managed to escape through a second-floor window using a rope. In a dramatic escape, he crossed the border into Sweden. By then, the Soviet Union had entered the war against Nazi Germany, so Manus travelled through the Soviet Union, Turkey, Arabia, by ship via Cape Town to the US, to eventually return to fight in Europe.

He reconnected with the Norwegian military in the US and went on to further training in Canada, before crossing the Atlantic again to Belfast, then England. There, and in Scotland, he trained further and developed professional skills in sabotage and undercover work. He was then required to learn parachuting and was dropped in the forests near Oslo with a sabotage team.

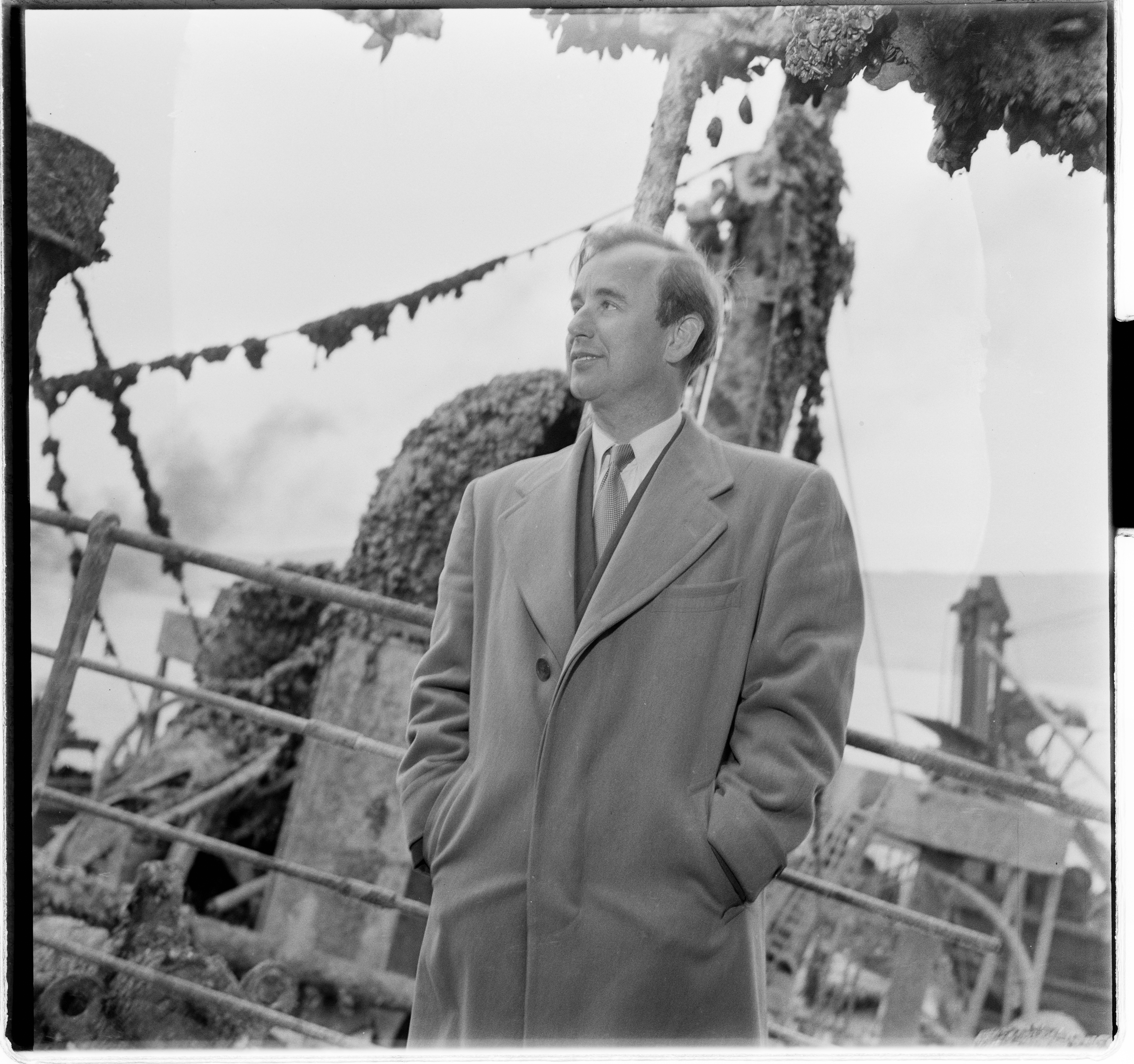
Max Manus on the wreck of the SS Donau which he sank on 16 January 1945. The photograph is from 1952, when Manus was present when the ship was raised again. National Archives of Norway

In Norway, he resumed his organizational work and made various sabotage attempts on ships in the Oslofjord with home-designed limpet mines and even 'swimmer-assisted torpedoes'. The former were the more successful, sinking and damaging some vessels. It was a long learning process of practical difficulty and danger. He made numerous hazardous trips back and forth across the border to Sweden, where he was able to get a respite from the constant mental and physical pressures of being undercover. Many of his comrades-in-arms were killed, captured and tortured, but Manus managed to survive through a combination of determination and luck, with some very narrow escapes.

Shortly after the end of the war, Manus wrote two books about himself. The first, Det vil helst gå godt ("It Usually Ends Well"), describes some of his enterprising and event-filled wandering and working in the jungles of South America and Latin America. Manus' second book was Det blir alvor (It Gets Serious), in which he continues the saga of his resistance work and personal successes in the 1945 sinking of two large vessels of great importance to the German war machine. When peace was declared, Manus found himself chosen to be the personal protection officer of the then Crown Prince of Norway on his triumphal parade in Oslo, and then also with King Haakon VII. This was a great honour, and he was lauded as one of Norway's most resilient and successful fighters, aged only 30 at the time.

Manus' books have been translated into English twice; initially an American, very loose and somewhat brief translation entitled 9 Lives Before Thirty, and, a few years later, Underwater Saboteur, a one-book adaptation of both of Manus' books, also somewhat concise. Both of these translations were made in the early years after the war, and names were changed in the interest of "protecting the guilty", although Manus himself never changed any names.

== Recognition ==
He was twice awarded Norway's highest decoration for military gallantry, the War Cross with sword (twice means he got one cross with two swords; only one other recipient received more swords). In addition to his Norwegian decorations, Manus received the British Distinguished Service Order (DSO) as well as the Military Cross (MC) and Bar (see list below).

== Peacetime ==
Manus went into the office supply business after the war: in the fall of 1945, he and Sophus Clausen went to the United States to set up contracts for office machines. Together they started the company Clausen og Manus. In the years after the war, Manus also hired people who had been convicted for collaborating with Nazi Germany, among them Walter Fyrst. Manus did this after internal discussions and was motivated by a wish for reconciliation, as well as professional considerations. In 1952, the company was split into Sophus Clausen AS and Max Manus AS which now distributed Olivetti and Philips office machines. The company still exists today.

== Personal life ==
Manus married Ida Nikoline "Tikken" Lindebrække in 1947, and they moved to Landøya, Asker. They met while she was working as liaison for the Norwegian saboteurs at the British consulate in Stockholm. Tikken was the daughter of the County Governor of Bergen and was the sister of Sjur Lindebrække, a bank manager who later became chairman of Høyre. In 1947, Lindebrække gave birth to Max Manus Jr.

Manus suffered from nightmares, alcoholism and bouts of depression after his experiences in the war, some of which he talked about in interviews.

== Death ==
After retirement, Manus and Tikken moved to Spain. Max died there in 1996 aged 81.

== Film ==
In December 2007, it was announced that a film about the life of Max Manus was to be made in Norway, starring Aksel Hennie in the leading role. The film premiered on 19 December 2008 and received mostly positive reviews.

== Ship renamed Max Manus ==
The ship M/S Troma, which was sunk in harbour at Oslo in 1944, was raised after the war by Pelle group and returned to service, under the name Max Manus.

== Other uses ==
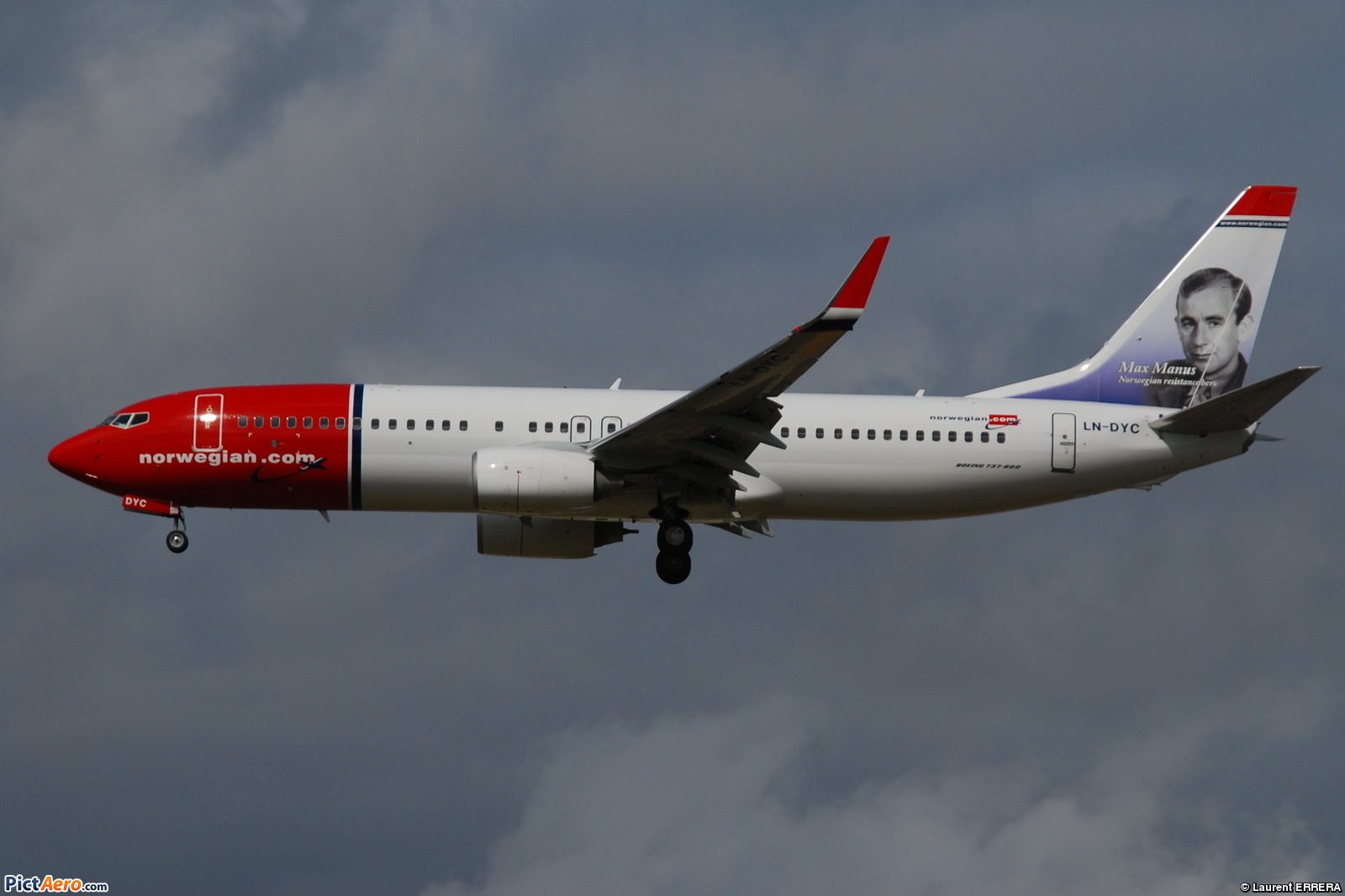
"Max Manus" as a "tail fin hero"

"Max Manus" is used as a "tail fin hero" on a Boeing 737-800 aircraft from Norwegian Air Shuttle.

== Honours and awards ==
- War Cross with two swords
- Defence Medal 1940–1945 (with rosette)
- Haakon VII 70th Anniversary Medal
- H. M. The King's Commemorative Medal (1940–1945)
- Distinguished Service Order (United Kingdom)
- Military Cross with Bar (United Kingdom)
- Winter War commemorative with "Lappi" clasp
- Medal of Freedom with silver palm (United States)
- Medal of Norwegian volunteers to Finland (1940)

== Bibliography ==
- Det vil helst gå godt – 1945
- Det blir alvor – 1946 (sequel to Det vil helst gå godt)
- Sally Olsen: Fangenes engel i Puerto Rico – 1975 (biography on social worker and missionary Sally Olsen)
- Mitt liv – 1995
- Rottejegeren - 2021 (posthumously released)
