= List of recipients of the George Medal, 1940s =

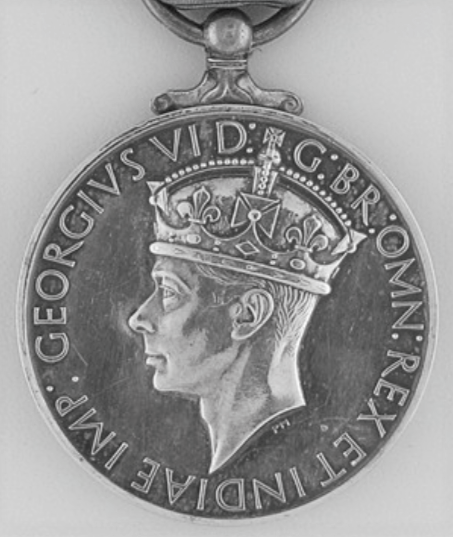
George VI, 1940 to 1948. Inscribed: GEORGIVS VI D: G: BR: OMN: REX ET INDIAE IMP:

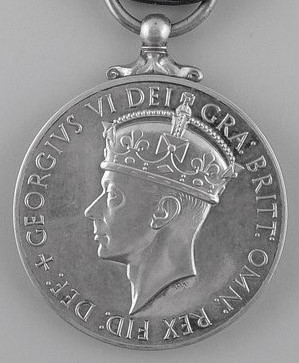
George VI, 1948 to 1952 (after Indian independence). Inscribed: GEORGIVS VI DEI: GRA: BRITT: OMN: REX FID: DEF:

The George Medal is awarded by the United Kingdom and Commonwealth of Nations for acts of great bravery; over 2,000 medals have been awarded since its inception in September 1940. Below is set out a selection of recipients of the award, in the 1940s. A person's presence in this list does not suggest their award was more notable than any other award of the George Medal. Where a recipient has received a second George Medal, a picture of the ribbon bearing the bar symbol is shown.

== World War II ==
Name	Rank and Unit	Action/Citation	Year awarded
George Clayton Abel	Flight Lieutenant, Royal Canadian Air Force	In November 1943 his aircraft, laden with fuel and bombs, crash-landed soon after take-off. The crew evacuated the burning aircraft, but Abel realized that the rear gunner was still trapped inside. Despite the imminent danger of an explosion Abel led the crew back to the aircraft, to attempt to rescue him, eventually smashing the plexiglass with his bare hands to pull the gunner free.	1944
Thomas Edward Holliday	Police Inspector, Lancashire County Constabulary	Led a team of 6 Stretford policeman during the Manchester Blitz on 22/23 December 1940. He was on duty continuously for 30 hours. The six men crammed into Inspector Holliday's car and, ignoring falling bombs, went from one place to another, taking part in rescue work and helping to put out fires	1941
Helen Rodriguez	Matron, POW Hospital Taunggyi Burma	In April 1942 the Japanese bombed Taunggyi. Helen Rodriguez found a small hospital coping with 400 casualties while people outside the wailed for the dead. She was awarded the George medal for staying behind to save sick and badly wounded Indian soldiers abandoned in the disorganised British retreat. She began by carrying a 12 stone man on her back to slit trench, returning for the rest of his companions one by one, over a 4-day period. Her decoration became known to the Japanese after being gazetted in London and they pulled her in for interrogation as a suspected spy whereby she was tortured.	1942
Margaret Irene Anderson	Staff Nurse, Australian Army Nursing Service	In recognition of conspicuous gallantry when her ship, Empire Star, was attacked by enemy aircraft during the evacuation of Singapore.	1942
Thomas Joseph McCarthy	Police Constable, Bootle Police Force	For rescuing people trapped in blitz-demolished houses - he also has the Kings Commendation for brave conduct in Civil Defence).	1941
Albert Arthur	Flying Officer, Royal Air Force Volunteer Reserve	In February 1944 an aircraft, carrying a 500-pound (230 kg) bomb and incendiaries, crashed near a Royal Air Force Station, and caught fire. Arthur, a gunnery instructor, attempted to rescue the crew despite the heat and exploding ammunition. He was joined by Flight Lieutenant Alfred George Spencer, the station medical officer. Arthur entered the burning aircraft no less than four times, but was eventually driven back by the heat and flames. Spencer stayed close at hand and searched the wreckage for possible survivors. It was not until the bombs were red hot and Spencer was certain that the crew must be dead from the heat that the officers abandoned their efforts. They then warned the fire party to withdraw and cleared the area just before the bomb exploded.	1944
William "Bill" Bailey	Lieutenant, Royal Naval Volunteer Reserve	First awarded in 1942, for his work as a clearance diver at Gibraltar. A bar to the GM was awarded for gallantry in 1944.	1942; 1945
William Aubrey Bailey	Captain, Church Army, Paddington	In April 1941, after himself being victim in a London air raid, he continued to tunnel under wreckage to rescue other victims.	1941
John James Baillie	Flying Officer, Royal Canadian Air Force, No. 194 Squadron RAF	On 14 June 1945, Baillie was the navigator of a Dakota which crashed and burst into flames near Mydngyan air strip in Central Burma. Although suffering from multiple head injuries, a broken cheek bone, and concussion, Baillie dragged two Indian other ranks clear of the wreck. He then re-entered the burning aircraft and rescued the injured wireless operator.	1945
Wesley Barker	Petty Officer, Royal Navy	In September 1943 for gallantry and undaunted devotion to duty. Disposed of a parachute mine, on land, within a minefield at great personal risk, Mersa Matruh, Egypt.	1943
Andre Bathfield	Resident medical officer, Royal Chest Hospital, London	Heroism when the hospital was bombed. Awarded the GM along with assistant matron Catherine McGovern and staff nurse Patricia Marmion.	1941
Charity Anne Bick	ARP Dispatch Rider, West Bromwich	For delivering several messages by bicycle during a heavy air raid in the Birmingham Blitz in late 1940. Having lied about her age to join the ARP service, at 15 years old she is believed to be the youngest recipient of the George Medal.	1941
John Albert Billing	Sergeant, (acting Warrant Officer Class II) (Quartermaster-Sergeant), Royal Engineers; Birkenhead	"During the landings in Normandy on June 6th 1944, C.S.M. Billing boarded a ferry to supervise the discharge of stores. Shortly afterwards the ferry struck a mine and the port engine burst into flames. Further mines were then struck and the fire spread to packed oil stacked aft. C.S.M. Billing took over control, and with great coolness and presence of mind organised the removal of ammunition and the evacuation of personnel to a tug. He himself rescued an officer who was lying on the deck of the ferry with a broken leg and also saved the life of a wounded sapper, who had fallen near the blazing petrol cans. The tug later also struck a mine and grounded but C.S.M. Billing eventually succeeded in getting all the injured personnel ashore, where medical attention was available. He showed courage, resource and leadership of a high order."	1944
Augustus 'Gus' Blundell	Deputy A.R.P. Post Warden, Westminster	For showing outstanding courage during enemy air attacks and frequently risking his life to save others. On more than one occasion buildings collapsed while "he was inside performing rescue work without any consideration of his own safety" allowing him to save many lives.	1941
John Bradley	Member, Civil Defence Rescue Service, Bermondsey	Following a bombing raid on the London Docks at the height of the Blitz, Bradley was part of a rescue party with Ernest Playford entering a badly damaged and unsafe building to rescue a Post Warden. An adjacent wall was extremely unstable and liable to collapse, but Bradley and Playford refused to leave the trapped warden and Playford acted as human bridge as the wall collapsed on top of the damaged building with Bradley and Playford still inside. The warden was dug out alive; however, Bradley and Playford were severely injured. They were amongst the first recipients of the medal.	1941
Robert MacDonald Bremner	Surgeon Lieutenant – Commander Royal Navy	...for great bravery and devotion to duty in saving life...	1942
John Bridge	Lieutenant, Royal Navy Volunteer Reserve	In September 1940 Bridge was in charge of a bomb disposal squad at Devonport and carried out the demolition of a very dangerous bomb fitted with a delayed-action fuze. In May 1941 he disposed of a bomb which had fallen into the sluice valve chamber between two graving docks at Falmouth and failed to explode. He was the first military officer awarded a Bar to his GM. Bridge later received the George Cross for clearing enemy depth charges from Messina harbour in Sicily over a period of 10 days in August 1943.	1940; 1941
Leonard Charles Bridgeman	Corporal, Royal Air Force	A vessel which was taking a naval and RAF salvage crew to an aircraft which had crashed into the sea on the previous day struck a mine and sank. However, the forepart of the vessel remained afloat for a short period, and Bridgeman, suffering from the effects of the explosion, and accompanied by a naval officer, descended to the hold to rescue the injured. In spite of warnings, Bridgeman continued his rescue work and, when this part of the vessel capsized and sank, he went under with the wreckage. He managed to get clear and was rescued later. The naval officer lost his life.	1942
Paul Roland Frank Britnell	Lieutenant, Royal Navy Volunteer Reserve	Britnell dived on a mine in Europa Hafen at Bremen which appeared to be a GC type. When it was eventually raised, the description was confirmed and it contained an acoustic unit. The water was approximately 30 feet at the time of the dive and visibility was nil. The mine was buried nose first in the mud. The primer proved very difficult to remove but on the sixth attempt using acoustic procedure Britnell finally extracted it. In addition, he also rendered safe three other mines during the operation, one GC type with acoustic unit, and two GD mines fitted with pressure and magnetic units.	1945
Albert William Brittan	ARP Heavy Rescue Service, Greenwich	Whilst serving as a squad leader, Brittan rescued four persons, including a woman and two children, from a collapsed building. In the middle of this rescue he was himself trapped for five hours when the roof of the adjoining building also collapsed on him.	1941
Tommy Brown	Junior Canteen Assistant, NAAFI, HMS Petard	Brown and two others boarded the abandoned U-559 to retrieve materials and code books. The U-boat suddenly sank killing his two companions. It was later discovered that Brown had lied about his age in order to enlist and was only 16 years old, making him one of the youngest recipients of the medal.	1942
Alfred Henry George Brunges	Section Leader, Aston Home Guard	During an air raid on 26 October 1940 Brunges and Patrol Leader Charles William Lovelace Tozer entered a basement air raid shelter which had been destroyed by a bomb. The shelter was rapidly filling with water from a broken main, and heavy bombs were falling in the vicinity, but Brunges and Tozer removed loose beams and debris with their bare hands until between fifteen and twenty people had been extricated, about half of them still alive. The two men only stopped when it was impossible to discover any further people.	1941
John "Buster" Cain	Costermonger, Dalston	The then-youngest recipient, he was just 15 in March 1941 when he helped in a rescue at a bombed and burning paint factory. He pulled six men from the building and helped rescue 30 in total. He received his medal from the King shortly after his 16th birthday. Pathe News	1941
Arthur Catley	Private, Pioneer Corps	Conspicuous gallantry in carrying out hazardous work in a very brave manner.	1944
William John Chaplin	Lieutenant	In recognition of gallant and distinguished services in the South West Pacific.	1946
Geoffrey John Cliff	Lieutenant, Royal Australian Naval Volunteer Reserve	First awarded in 1942 for work undertaken defusing mines in London. Later the same year he was awarded a bar for defusing mines in Belfast.	1942; 1942
Michael Arthur Clinton	Lieutenant, Royal Engineers, No. 22 Bomb Disposal Company	Clinton was tasked with immunizing and removing a SC250 bomb in Romford. This was fitted with a Type 17 fuze, but the fuze pocket was damaged and it could not be removed. Whilst being lifted the fuze became active and ticking was heard, but it stopped. His bar was awarded for defusing a bomb that had two fuzes, a normal Type 50, but also a new delayed action Type 17A. This was possibly the first of these new fuzes to be discovered. Clinton took the decision to remove it for research.	1942; 1943
Arthur Henry Cobby	Group Captain (temporary Air Commodore), Royal Australian Air Force	On 7 September 1943, he was travelling as a passenger on a Catalina flying boat when it crashed at Townsville, Queensland. Although injured, Cobby helped rescue two other survivors.	1943
Daniel John Collins	Sergeant, Liverpool City Police	He rescued a woman and two children from the cellar of a bombed building, tunnelling through heavy debris with the assistance of three others. Despite the danger of fire and rising coal gas, he was able to bring them to safety.	1941
George Douglas Cook	Lieutenant, Royal Canadian Naval Volunteer Reserve	First awarded in 1941 for defusing a parachute mine in the Suez Canal and examining its booby trap device to gain a better understanding of its operation. In 1942 a bar was awarded for defusing a sea mine near Haifa fitted with an explosive device sensitive to light.	1941; 1942
Lionel Kenneth Crabb	Lieutenant, Royal Naval Volunteer Reserve	Clearance diver. For gallantry and undaunted devotion to duty.	1944
Joan Lois Dowson	S.O.E.	Recruited from Girton College, Cambridge where she was reading French, Joan Dowson parachuted into France, landing near to Bayeux, in February 1944 to inform and help organise the French Resistance for the Allied invasion of June 1944. Arrested by the Germans she was released after 24 hours. Being a fluent French speaker, speaking completely without an accent they believed her to be Lisette Bavoir, a French secretary. Following the invasion, on 10 June, she assisted the British and American forces as they made their way through Northern France. She was repatriated to England as part of the 'Operation Python' scheme and, for the remainder of her life, never spoke of her wartime experiences.	
Elvire de Greef	Chef de Secteur, Comet line, Belgian Resistance	Also known as "Tante Go". For smuggling downed airmen out of France.	1945
Andrée de Jongh	Founder, Comet line, Belgian Resistance	Aged 20, in 1941 she appeared in Bilbao with an escaped airman and two Belgian assistants, and asked for permission to set up the Comet (Comète) escape line. Andrée formed the organisation and ran it, escorting 118 airmen over the Pyrenees personally. She was arrested by the Germans in 1943, but survived several concentration camps.	1944
Bernard Peter de Neumann	Second Officer, Merchant Navy	For removing a 250 kg bomb from the engine room of SS Tewkesbury.	1941
Thomas Henry Dennis	Flight sergeant, Royal Australian Air Force	A navigator in a Douglas aircraft that was making a forced landing over water, he swam for two hours with non-swimming passengers, through rain squalls and sharks, saving many lives.	1944
Geoffrey Howard Dhenin	Flying Officer, Medical Branch of the Royal Air Force Volunteer Reserve	One night in October, 1943, an aircraft, which had sustained damage during an attack against Hanover, crashed near an airfield. The aircraft disintegrated on impact and immediately burst into flames. The rear gunner was injured and trapped in his crushed turret, being pinned down by the remains of the tail unit and the rear of the fuselage. A high explosive bomb was in the blazing wreckage some 10 yards away from the gunner. Flying Officer Dhenin, the station medical officer, and Corporal Lush, a gunner, hastened to the scene of the accident. Although fully aware that the heat might cause the bomb to detonate at any moment Flying Officer Dhenin worked for over half an hour to relieve the injured airman's pain and, assisted by Corporal Lush, endeavoured to release him. Their efforts to extricate the gunner were, however, unavailing. A mobile crane was brought to the scene and the mass of wreckage was lifted clear of the ground. Displaying complete disregard for his own safety, Flying Officer Dhenin then crawled under the wreckage and released the trapped airman thereby enabling others helpers to drag him to safety. Flying Officer Dhenin and Corporal Lush showed fine courage and determination in circumstances of great danger.	1944
James Flint	Flight Sergeant, Royal Air Force	Attempting to save his navigator from a crashed aircraft. Also awarded a DFM for the same operation	1941
Marie-Louise Dissard	French Resistance, Pat O'Leary Line, Leader, Francoise Line	Took over leadership of the PAT escape line after the arrest of Ian Garrow and Albert Guérisse and led the Francoise Line.	
Michelle Dumon	Chef de Secteur, Comet line, Belgian Resistance	Belgian teenager known as "Michou" who rescued downed airmen. Eventually identified by the Germans she fled to England in May 1944, having by then smuggled no fewer than 150 Allied personnel out of France.	1945
John Penfield Epps	Captain, Port of London Authority	London dockmaster who saved ships and lives during the Blitz.	1941
Ernest Thomas John Fairbrother	Lieutenant, Corps of Royal Engineers	Conspicuous gallantry in carrying out hazardous work in a very brave manner.	1944
James Finlay	Sergeant, Royal Artillery, 114th Light Anti-Aircraft Regiment	Rescued 14 men from a burning landing craft and ferry in a minefield.	1944
Frank Thomas Turner Fowler	Corporal, Intelligence Corps	Awarded "in recognition of conspicuous gallantry in carrying out work in a very brave manner". He is believed to have rescued one or more persons from a burning aircraft.	1944
Berthe Fraser	SOE liaison	Liaison for both F section (Sylvestre/Farmer circuit) and RF section (Yeo-Thomas) in Arras, Pas-de-Calais, France.	1946
Arthur Charles Aldridge French	Station Officer, London Fire Brigade	For displaying "bold and fearless leadership" for over four hours, and successfully preventing flames from reaching a heavy time bomb, saving an important railway bridge.	1941
Lewis Gerhold	Lieutenant, Royal Engineers, No. 11 Bomb Disposal Company	Awarded for bomb disposal at the Royal Ordnance Factory, Bishopton, Renfrewshire, 4 October to 24 November 1940; at the High Level Rothsay Docks, Isle of Bute, 14 March to 3 April 1941; at the Tannockside Colliery, Lanarkshire, 9 to 12 May 1941; and in Essex, 1943.	1941; 1943
Ernest Oliver Gidden	Sub-Lieutenant, Royal Naval Volunteer Reserve	For defusing a mine which had fallen between two houses in Harlesden in the late summer of 1940.	1941
John David Gillott	Second Lieutenant, The Cheshire Regiment	In May 1941, in spite of heavy high explosive bombing and several casualties, he rallied the 110 men in his command and continued to extinguish about 200 incendiary bombs saving the warehouses in his charge. Three days later several of the warehouses were demolished by high explosive and in one case a complete warehouse fell on seven of his men. Second-Lieutenant Gillott personally tunnelled under the burning debris in search of these men; masonry was falling around him but he continued until he was able to locate them. At great personal risk he kept at this work until a further search party arrived at dawn. As a result of his gallant initiative one man was brought out alive.	1941
Florentino Goikoetxea	Mountain guide, Comet line, Belgian Resistance	Basque who smuggled 283 Allied airmen out of France over the Pyrenees.	1945
Leonard Verdi Goldsworthy	Lieutenant, Royal Australian Naval Volunteer Reserve, HMS Vernon	Awarded for defusing two mines in September and October 1943, one at a Southampton wharf and the other in the River Thames. By the end of the war Goldsworthy was an acting lieutenant commander, had also received the George Cross and Distinguished Service Cross, and made safe more than 300 mines.	1944
Frederick J. Gradden	Deputy Leader, Rescue Party, Wimbledon	During an enemy air raid on 1 October 1940 a bomb fell on a large house reducing it to rubble. Rescue Parties arrived at the scene and heard the faint cries of a person trapped underneath. Gradden tunnelled 20 feet through the debris, reaching the trapped person after two and a half hours work. He remained with her, guiding workers trying to reach her from above. Gradden remained there for three and a half hours, until the rescue party was able to remove the victim. Gradden was working in very dangerous surroundings for a total of over five hours, during part of which enemy aircraft were in the vicinity.	1941
Harold Grant	Sergeant, Pioneer Corps	Conspicuous gallantry in carrying out hazardous work in a very brave manner.	1944
John Astley Gray	Group Captain, Royal Air Force	A Wellington bomber made a belly landing at RAF Honington, coming to rest in a bomb dump, and caught fire. Joseph Aidan MacCarthy, assisted by Gray, entered the burning wreck and rescued two crewmen, receiving serious burns in the process. Both men were subsequently awarded the GM.	1941
Maurice Walter Griffiths	Lieutenant, Royal Naval Volunteer Reserve	For trawling floating German magnetic mines in the North Sea.	1941
James Leslie Harries	Acting Commander, Royal Canadian Naval Volunteer Reserve	First awarded in 1943 for dealing with two acoustic mines near Whitstable. In 1945 a bar awarded "for exceptional gallantry, skill and great devotion to duty, often in close proximity to the enemy, during mine searching and clearance operations in the ports of Normandy and of the Low Countries."	1943; 1945
Frederick Arthur Harrison	Lance Bombardier, 114th Light Anti-Aircraft Regiment, Royal Artillery	Rescued 14 men from a burning landing craft and ferry in a minefield.	1944
Thomas Hill	Corporal Royal Air Force Police	A number of Defiant Aircraft were practising intercepting Botha aircraft when one Defiant (N1745) collided with a Botha (L6509) sending both aircraft crashing into the central train station in Blackpool. Acting Corporal Hill had been at the barrier outside No.3 platform when the Botha came through the roof: "There was a great flash 25 yards in front of where I was standing and an explosion blew me off my feet. I thought it was a bomb and ran towards the wreckage, seeing that people were trapped and though the heat was intense I succeeded in getting three women out. Their clothes were on fire. I had thrown off my respirator and jacket and with the jacket I tried to smother the flames. Everybody was giving all the assistance they could." Cpl. Hill had gone into the inferno on three separate occasions to rescue victims in spite of warnings that the station roof might collapse at any moment. On 29 January 1942 the Air Ministry announced the award of the George Medal to Cpl Thomas Hill for his "undaunted courage" in the incident.	1941
Joseph Hill	Driver (acting Lance-Corporal), Royal Army Service Corps	Following the crash of a Typhoon fighter-bomber close to his company's location Lance Corporal Hill reached the scene to find the pilot trapped while the aircraft had caught fire. Hill used an axe to extricate the pilot as ammunition and flares exploded around them. After twenty minutes work Hill was able to drag the pilot to safety just minutes before the fuel tanks exploded.	1945
Geoffrey Ambrose Hodges	Probationary Lieutenant, Royal Naval Volunteer Reserve	For "gallantry and undaunted devotion to duty" in bomb disposal.	1940
Henry Towers Holland	ARP Warden, Ealing	A bomb fell on a building which was mostly of timber. Hearing cries for help Warden Holland plunged into the burning building and although almost overcome by the flames and smoke succeeded in bringing out a fellow warden. Blazing wood from the roof was falling and Holland showed great bravery in the face of a very grave danger.	1941
Leonard Hollands	Sergeant, Corps of Royal Engineers	Awarded "in recognition of conspicuous gallantry in carrying out hazardous work" in bomb disposal.	1943
Emma Horne	Nursing Sister, Coventry & Warwickshire Hospital, Coventry	On the night of 8/9 April 1941, during the Coventry Blitz, her hospital was bombed. She evacuated many patients and rescued a trapped nurse.	1941
Ernest William Howard	Warden, Civil Defence Service, Exeter	For rescuing five people trapped in the cellar of bombed house which was on fire.	1942
George Archibald Howe	Manager, Shell-Mex & BP	On 1 July 1940 Salt End, East Riding of Yorkshire (five miles east of Kingston upon Hull) suffered the very first daylight raid on mainland Britain, when between 16:40 and 17:00 a German aircraft dropped its bombs on the oil terminal in a nuisance raid, in which the aircraft unsuccessfully attacked several barrage balloons. Shrapnel from the bomb punctured a 2,500 ton holding tank and the leaking petrol caught fire and threatened to cause adjacent tanks to explode. The courageous effort of depot staff and fire brigades prevented a major disaster.	1940
George Denis Howes	Second Officer, Merchant Navy, SS Peterton	After his ship was sunk by the U-109 on 17 September 1942 in the North Atlantic. Howes found himself commanding a lifeboat with twenty-one of the crew aboard. The food rations ran out after 34 days, and there was only a reduced water ration for the last 15 days. On the 49th day they were picked up by the naval trawler HMS Canna (T161) and landed at Freetown, where one crewman died in hospital.	1943
Jim Howell	Petty Officer, Royal Navy, HMS Pintail (K21)	Awarded for his bravery, when he disabled a 2,000 pounds (910 kg) mine from the side of a ship, saving it, and all on board. Two weeks after receiving the medal from the King, he and two thirds of the crew were killed in action when they went to help the steamship Royal Scot after it detonated an acoustic mine, blew up and sank. Pintail immediately dashed to the scene to help in the rescue, but she was also destroyed by an acoustic mine. He was pictured in the Daily Herald on 17 September 1941 with his medal.	1941
John Pilkington Hudson	Captain (temporary Major), Royal Engineers	First awarded for an incident at Flour Mill, Albert Bridge, Battersea, London, on 24 June 1943. Major Hudson was a boffin and needed fuzes for his research. He had developed a process for temporarily freezing a fuze, so enabling its removal whilst inert. The bar was awarded for spending nine days removing a new fuze from a V-1 flying bomb.	1943; 1944
John Thomas Humphries	Petty Officer, Royal Australian Navy	For courage and skill displayed in diving operations while serving on HMS Kanimbla, an armed merchant cruiser. Resident of Brisbane.	1942
Victor William Hutchings	War Reserve Constable, Exeter City Police	For rescuing five people trapped in the cellar of bombed house which was on fire.	1942
George Arthur Hutchinson	Leading Aircraftman, Royal Air Force	For helping a number of people to safety during a fire in a top storey room at a Royal Air Force Station in February, 1941. While the building was at risk of collapse, he climbed onto a window ledge where a man was immobilized with his clothes on fire, attempted to extinguish him and got him off the ledge.	1941
Kenneth Hutton	Sapper, Royal Engineers	Awarded in recognition of gallant conduct in carrying out hazardous work in the Middle East in a very brave manner. The citation held at the TNA in Kew states he was part of a team near to a lorry containing 400 mines which exploded and in spite of being wounded in six places he pulled one of the crew out.	1943
John Inglis	Second Officer, Merchant Navy	Awarded after his ship was very heavily attacked by Japanese aircraft with machine guns and bombs shortly after leaving Singapore. Inglis, in charge in charge of one of the fire parties, was blown into the air by bomb blast and wounded by splinters, but refused treatment and carried on working to save the ship from fire.	1942
Iaking Iwagu	Sergeant, Royal Papuan Constabulary	In September 1943 at Finschafen, Scarlet Beach, New Guinea, a landing craft was under heavy machine-gun fire from a hidden enemy and unable to reach the beach. Lowering the ramp, an Australian captain went to swim ashore but started sinking. Iwagu swam him to shore despite enemy fire, and remained with him for nearly an hour until stretcher bearers could reach the captain. In later bombings, the member continued to display 'coolness and calm bearing'.	1944
Ronald Jackson	Constable, Birmingham City Police	In April 1941, during a German air raid in the Small Heath, Birmingham, Probationer Constable Ron Jackson crawled into the ruins of a bombed block of flats after hearing the screams of a woman inside. Even though there was risk of the building collapsing as well as rising water levels from a burst water mains, PC Jackson then began to saw through a concrete block which had pinned the woman to the ground. After working alone for 2 hours, he managed to free and rescued the woman.	1941
Porter Cornelius Jarrell	Private, Royal Army Medical Corps	An American serving in the Special Boat Squadron, Jarrell was part of an SBS unit that occupied the Greek island of Symi in September 1943, following the Italian Armistice. On 8 October during an air raid by German Junkers Ju 87s the headquarters building of the SBS was hit by a bomb, trapping two men inside. Jarrell worked for 27 hours without rest to free them, through two further air raids, and had to amputate the crushed leg of one man in order to free him.	1944
Stephan Robert Jeeves	Member of the Auxiliary Fire Service	A Body Makers Assistant, Southern Railway at the Slade Green Depot attended a fire at the Slade Green Depot where a large number of incendiary bombs fell on and around the railway station and inspection sheds, igniting box wagons containing munitions. He led an attempt to subdue the blazing trucks of exploding shells. Wit two volunteers he ran forward with a hose having only advanced a few paces when one of the men fell fatally wounded. He was forced to give up when the water supply failed. He showed gallant conduct and outstanding leadership in the face of extreme danger. He joined the Royal Navy in 1942 and was killed when his ship HMS Welshman was sunk of the coast of Tobruk on 1 February 1943.	1941
George Daniel Jones	Gas holder attendant, Bristol Gas Company	During an air raid on Bristol in November 1940, two incendiary bombs lodged on the crown of a large gas holder. Jones climbed to the top of the holder and knocked the bombs clear with his steel hat. During the same raid, and again while the attack was still in progress, he went out to locate and temporarily stop holes caused by bomb splinters after hearing gas escaping. On another occasion, when a gas holder had been badly punctured and caught fire, he went to the scene although he was off duty and helped to extinguish the fire before serious damage was done.	1941
Martin Challenor Page Johnson	Lieutenant (later Lieutenant Commander), Royal Naval Reserve	Awarded for gallantry and undaunted devotion to duty during mine disposal in the UK between October 1941 and August 1942. He made safe four torpedoes in the only German submarine to be captured and brought to Britain during the Second World War. HMS Graph surrendered after being depth-charged and machine-gunned by an RAF Hudson south of Iceland in 1941, and was taken to Vickers' shipyard at Barrow-in-Furness.	1942
Sybil Kathigasu	Nurse, Ipoh, Malaya	For services to the forces during military operations in Malaya prior to 2 September 1945. Kathigasu and her husband Dr. Abdon C. Kathigasu, supported the resistance during the Japanese occupation of Malaya, secretly listening to BBC news broadcasts, and providing information and medical treatment to the Malayan Peoples' Anti-Japanese Army. She was eventually arrested by the Kempeitai in 1943, revealing nothing under interrogation, despite being waterboarded. She is the only Malayan woman to be awarded the George Medal.	1947
George Keen	Sub Ganger, Southern Railway Company	After an ammunition train of some fifty wagons was hit by a bomb during an air raid and caught fire. Keen and George Leach led a working party to help move the damaged wagons, to prevent the fire spreading. This took about two hours, during which time burning wagons were exploding.	1940
Walter Kenney	Superintendent, HM Dockyard Police, Malta	During enemy air attacks on the Malta Dockyard Superintendent Kenney led the Dockyard Fire Brigade in fighting fires afloat and ashore. On one occasion when he was in charge of fire-fighting on a vessel, further heavy attacks were made but, despite this, the fire was put out and many tons of valuable cargo saved. From that ship he went to another and, although there was grave risk of the explosion of ammunition that formed part of the cargo, continued to fight the fires.	1942
James Henry 'Jim' Kessack	Lieutenant, Royal Australian Naval Volunteer Reserve	Courage, initiative and devotion to duty. A resident of Sydney, New South Wales. As a mine clearer, aged 28, he died in the execution of his duty on 28 April 1941. The week prior to his death he said 'Bomb disposing is a dirty job, out it gets under your skin to such an extent that there would be a minor mutiny if the chief called for volunteers. All jobs are done by rotation. We Australians are running a 'Derby' on who gets the greatest number or bombs. I am temporarily leading. Everyone is engaging in cut-throat competition for the biggest jobs'.	1941
Muhammad Azad Khan	H/Captain, 1st Punjab Regiment (PJ No. 10036)	Awarded in 1943 for fighting bravely against the Japanese Army & took the railway station captured by the enemy during World War II in Java, Sumatra. From Samli Dam, Islamabad, Pakistan. He also received the 1939/45 Star, War Medal, Burma Star, Indian Service Medal (ISM), G.S. Medal, IDSM, OBI Class II, N.W. Frontier of India 1930 & Waziristan 1936–1937. He also fought in Kashmir during Indo-Pak war in 1948 with Capt. Sarwar Shaheed. He died in 1989.	1943
Patrick King	Air Raid Warden, Seaton Delaval	On 26 August 1940 he rescued a blind woman from a bombed house during an air-raid.	1940
George William Knowles	Civilian	On Thursday 19 July 1945, an RAF Transport Command Liberator aircraft crashed near Mascot, New South Wales, Australia, shortly after take-off. Local resident Knowles rescued three of the twelve deceased Royal Air Force and Royal Navy personnel. With courage and utter disregard of personal safety, as a result of burns, immersion and carbon monoxide poisoning, he collapsed.	1946
George Graham Layton	Aircraftman 2nd Class, Royal Air Force	In July 1942 he rescued an airman from a fiercely burning aircraft with bombs still on board, stripped him of his burning clothes and wrapped him in his own shirt.	1943
George Leach	Lengthsman, Southern Railway	After an ammunition train of some fifty wagons was hit by a bomb during an air raid and caught fire. Keen and George Leach led a working party to help move the damaged wagons, to prevent the fire spreading. This took about two hours, during which time burning wagons were exploding.	1940
John Reginald Linney	Lieutenant, Royal Armoured Corps	Conspicuous gallantry in carrying out hazardous work in a very brave manner.	1946
Philip Lucas	Test Pilot, Hawker Aircraft	Whilst flying the first prototype Hawker Tornado, P5219, his aircraft suffered a failure in the monocoque structure just forward of the cockpit, but Lucas managed to land the damaged fighter safely, saving the airframe from destruction, allowing it to be repaired and returned to flight one month later.	1941
A. C. McAlister	Leading aircraftman, Royal Australian Air Force	McAlister rescued a pilot from a burning fighter aircraft, amid exploding ammunition, and before the planes bombs exploded.	1944
Aidan MacCarthy	Acting Squadron Leader, Royal Air Force	A Wellington bomber made a belly landing at RAF Honington, coming to rest in a bomb dump, and caught fire. MacCarthy, assisted by Group Captain John Astley Gray, entered the burning wreck and rescued two crewmen, receiving serious burns in the process. Both men were subsequently awarded the GM.	1941
Catherine McGovern	Assistant matron, Royal Chest Hospital, London	Heroism when the hospital was bombed. Awarded the GM along with doctor Andre Bathfield and staff nurse Patricia Marmion.	1941
James Scott McGowan	Sergeant, Royal Army Ordnance Corps	Conspicuous gallantry in carrying out hazardous work in a very brave manner.	1944
Charles McIver	Civilian Lorry Driver, Maybury Mansion, Marylebone Street, London	On 8 December 1940 a land mine fell from an enemy aircraft onto Maybury Mansions causing numerous casualties and great damage to property. Working independently of rescue parties and other A.R.P. Personnel, Mr Charles McIver (36) and Mr Charles Gessey (36), alongside several police officers, were instrumental in rescuing several persons from the damaged buildings. To do this it was necessary to climb onto parts of the buildings that were extremely dangerous and in carrying out the rescue of a Miss O'Connor, from the top floor the stairway collapsed. Mr McIver and other rescuers fell a distance of 25 ft into the basement. He sustained a serious injury to his head, but still carried on the work of rescuing the injured woman. Statements from two civilians and other witnesses, including that of War Reserve Constable 424 D. Tanner clearly show these men worked hard and persistently under extremely dangerous conditions and with total disregard for their own safety.	1940
Alan Wedel Ramsey McNicoll	Lieutenant-Commander, Royal Australian Navy	For gallantry and undaunted devotion to duty. In 1940 with the captured Italian submarine Galileo Galilei, McNicoll removed the inertia pistols from eight corroded torpedoes. A resident of Melbourne, Victoria.	1941
Frans (Frank) Mallia	Chargeman of Labourers, HM Dockyard, Malta	On 11 June 1940, during an enemy air raid on the area of the Corradino, a bomb scattered splinters and debris near a gun and its crew, killing one. To protect the gun from further damage it was decided to erect splinter plates around it, each weighing three-quarters of a ton. Mallia, Chargeman of Labourers, and B. J. Lewis, Chargeman of Fitters, and their respective gangs volunteered. The following day they undertook the transport and re-erection of a gun, which normally would have taken four full days. They did it in five days and three hours in spite of frequent bombing raids, with no protection beyond steel helmets.	1940
Patricia Marmion	Staff nurse, Royal Chest Hospital, London	Heroism when the hospital was bombed. Awarded the GM along with doctor Andre Bathfield and assistant matron Catherine McGovern.	1941
David Alexander Methven	Second-Lieutenant, Corps of Royal Engineers	Awarded for his role in Mine Disposal work at Mablethorpe Beach (Lincolnshire) on 25 December 1941, and at Skegness Beach (Lincolnshire) on 5 April 1942. The award of his George Medal was published in the London Gazette on 10 July 1942 (page 3039). While he was at Sheerness three children wandered into a minefield on the beach. Two were killed. The third lay injured fifteen yards within the mined area. " Without any consideration for personal safety, 2nd Lieutenant Methven immediately entered the minefield and picked his path to the injured victim."	1942
Gilbert W. J. Mitchell	Farmer	Considered probably unique, a decoration for 'carrying on a farm on the British coast nearest Europe despite enemy attacks'. Mitchell, his wife, and Miss G. L. Harrison showed 'sustained bravery and devotion to duty in carrying on farming under enemy gunfire and air attacks'. Mrs Mitchell and Miss Harrison were awarded the British Empire Medal.	1942
Morgan Charles Giles	Lieutenant, Royal Navy	For "gallantry and undaunted devotion to duty" during bomb and mine disposal work while serving at HMS Nile, Egypt.	1941
Arthur Henry Musgrave Morris	Captain	For gallantry in Italy	1941
John Stuart Mould	Lieutenant, Royal Australian Naval Volunteer Reserve	Awarded "for gallantry and undaunted devotion to duty", in mine disposal. He was awarded the George Cross in November 1942.	1942
Harold Sidney Noble	WO I (RSM), Corps of Military Police	Conspicuous gallantry in carrying out hazardous work in a very brave manner.	1944
Louis Henri Nouveau	French Resistance, PAT line	Nouveau was a broker from Marseille who was a financial supporter of the escape line organised by Ian Garrow in Southern France in 1940, which later became known as the "PAT Line". Nouveau became a member of the organisation in March 1941, and his flat was used as a safe house for numerous escapers and evaders. In early 1943 Nouveau travelled to Brittany to expand the network, but was betrayed and arrested by the Germans on 13 February. He spent the rest of war in various concentration camps, but survived the war.	c.1945
Denis James Patrick O'Hagan	Acting Lieutenant (later Acting Commander), Royal Canadian Naval Volunteer Reserve, HMS Vernon	At the main power station in Manchester, O'Hagan used live steam from a railway locomotive to melt and drain the explosive from an air-dropped mine, whose fuze and anti-tamper system were new to British Intelligence. He was awarded a second George Medal after a similar incident involving a new "G" type mine at Nuneaton.	1941; 1942
Peter Guy Ottewill	Acting Squadron Leader, Royal Air Force	In June 1943 a Beaufighter aircraft crashed into an ammunition store when taking off and immediately caught fire. Despite the exploding ammunition in the aircraft and the store, Ottewill jumped on the wing of the burning aircraft, opened the hatch and pulled the pilot clear, then returned and rescued the observer.	1943
Jack Owen	Fireman, Kingston upon Hull Fire Brigade	On 1 July 1940 Salt End, East Riding of Yorkshire, (five miles east of Kingston upon Hull) suffered the very first daylight raid on mainland Britain, when between 16:40 and 17:00 a German aircraft dropped its bombs on the oil terminal in a nuisance raid, in which the aircraft unsuccessfully attacked several barrage balloons. Shrapnel from the bomb punctured a 2,500 ton holding tank and the leaking petrol caught fire and threatened to cause adjacent tanks to explode. The courageous effort of depot staff and fire brigades prevented a major disaster.	1940
Richard Townshend Payne	Captain, Merchant Navy	On the night of 17/18 September 1940 his ship, SS Marina, was torpedoed by the U-48 in position 56°46′N 21°15′W, and sank in fifteen minutes. Captain Payne remained on board until sure that all his crew were in the lifeboats, leaving the ship moments before it sank. At dawn he decided to head for the coast of Ireland, several hundred miles away. The sixteen men in the boat received a daily ration of three dry biscuits and a dipper of water. After six days the water ran out, and the men were too weak to eat the dry biscuit. On the eighth day they sighted a ship which took them aboard and towed the boat to port.	1941
Marion Patterson	Civil Service Senior Fireguard	For outstanding courage, initiative and selfless devotion to duty during a Luftwaffe bombing-raid on the Aberdeen harbour area on 7 August 1942. She rescued a Royal Navy serviceman from a bombed building which collapsed seconds after their escape.	1942
Geoffrey Charles Geary Pepper	Captain (temporary Major), Royal Army Ordnance Corps	Conspicuous gallantry in carrying out hazardous work in a very brave manner.	1944
Thomas Patrick Peters	Able Seaman, Royal Navy	For gallantry and undaunted devotion to duty during bomb and mine disposal in Messina Harbour, Sicily, for two weeks ending 20 June 1944.	1944
William Victor Philpott	Fire Sergeant, Bristol Fire Brigade	For exceptional gallantry during an enemy incendiary raid on the petrol storage installation at Milford Haven. Whilst under enemy bombardment and machine gun fire, Sgt. Philpott lead a team of fireman through the burning fuel installation to take hoses to the estuary so they could obtain the water needed to fight the fire.	1940
Ernest Lewis Playford	Leader, Civil Defence Rescue Service, Bermondsey	Following a bombing raid on the London Docks at the height of the Blitz, Playford was part of a rescue party with John Bradley entering into badly damaged and unsafe building to rescue a Post Warden. An adjacent wall was extremely unstable and liable to collapse, but he and Bradley refused to leave the trapped warden and Playford acted as human bridge as the wall collapsed on top of the damaged building with him and Bradley still inside. The warden was dug out alive; however, Playford and Bradley were severely injured. They were amongst the first recipients of the medal.	1941
Edward Redknapp	Member, ARP Rescue Party, Holborn	Despite an order to halt the rescue of those trapped in a basement shelter due to a second bombing attack, Redknapp led ten men back to continue work for four hours in masses of debris and water until the last of 16 live casualties had been extricated.	1941
Howard Dudley Reid	Lieutenant, Royal Australian Naval Volunteer Reserve	First awarded for "gallantry and undaunted devotion to duty" in mine disposal between December 1940 to January 1941. Secondly for mine disposal in Glasgow in August 1941.	1941; 1942
James Baird Renfrew	Lance Corporal, Corps of Royal Engineers	For "conspicuous gallantry in carrying out hazardous work." Awarded for actions at Grimsby and Cleethorpes, Lincolnshire between 14 and 22 June 1943. On 16 June L/Sgt Renfrew went to the small yard at the rear of the Salvation Army Hall, to investigate an S.D.2 (Butterfly Bomb). He found a pile of sandbags; the ARP wardens had misunderstood instructions and covered the bomb with sandbags. He removed the top layer and cut through the lower ones, so as not to disturb the device until he could view it. A charge was placed upon it and detonated, breaking a small window. On the 19th he defused a bomb, which he thought had failed to arm itself as he was working he heard it arm. He was fortunate that he was able to remove the fuse and throw it away. Luckily, the gaine made of Bakelite was broken and stayed in the bomb, minimising the explosion. However he did suffer a few pieces of copper embedded in his hand. The 21st saw him dealing with a bomb insecurely balanced on a bed at 27 Campden Road, however he managed to move the furniture and destroyed the SD2 by a controlled explosion.	1943
Margaret Emma Richards	Lance-Corporal, Auxiliary Territorial Service	Richards was a medical orderly when anti-tank mine fuses exploded in an ammunition hut in Leicestershire, England, despite the risk of further explosions. Announced as the 'first ATS girl to win the George Medal'.	1948
George Roberts	Goods Guard, London, Midland and Scottish Railway	On 3 May 1941, during the Liverpool Blitz, Roberts led a party of railwaymen into a siding to uncouple the undamaged rear section of a munitions train which had been hit by a bomb and was on fire, while the air raid was still in progress.	1941
Victor Rothschild	Administrative Assistant, War Office	Rothschild was actually serving in the Security Service (MI5), as the head of Section B1C, dealing with "explosives and sabotage". He received the GM for defusing a German booby trap concealed in a case of onions in a ship's hold.	1944
Albert James Sambridge	Member, ARP Rescue Party, Hackney	A high explosive bomb struck a building causing fires and bursting the water mains. The water flooded the building and Sambridge risked his life freeing a trapped woman. He managed to get her free as the water reached five feet.	1941
George Samuel Sewell	Civilian Engineer, Shell-Mex and B.P. Ltd.	On 1 July 1940 Salt End, East Riding of Yorkshire, (five miles east of Kingston upon Hull) suffered the very first daylight raid on mainland Britain, when between 16:40 and 17:00 a German aircraft dropped its bombs on the oil terminal in a nuisance raid, in which the aircraft unsuccessfully attacked several barrage balloons. Shrapnel from the bomb punctured a 2,500 ton holding tank and the leaking petrol caught fire and threatened to cause adjacent tanks to explode. The courageous effort of depot staff and fire brigades prevented a major disaster. Sewell received his second award the following year (becoming the first person to receive the award twice) when the oil depot was again bombed. While an air raid was still in progress he used sand bags to extinguish jets of flame coming from a large fuel tank, and climbed onto another tank and kicked off an incendiary bomb.	1940; 1941
Archibald Ernest Sexton	War Reserve Constable, Metropolitan Police	For his part in rescuing two men and a woman trapped in an air-raid shelter underneath Moorfields Eye Hospital in London.	1944
Ellen Savage	Nurse	Sinking of AHS Centaur. Although suffering from severe injuries received as a result of the explosion and immersion in the sea, she displayed great heroism during the period while she and some male members of the ship's staff were floating on a raft, to which they clung for about 34 hours before being rescued by a US destroyer. She gave conspicuous service while on the raft in attending to wounds and burns suffered by other survivors. Her courage and fortitude did much to maintain the morale of her companions.	1944
Maurice Meynell Scarr	Shop Manager, Royal Ordnance Factory, Ministry of Supply	When high explosive filled shells were being loaded on to platform trucks in the porch of a building, a box was dropped and an explosion followed immediately. Scarr and his colleague, Thomas Jobbins, with full knowledge of the risk involved, volunteered to clear up the debris in the porch and shop before any workmen entered the building. In great danger from further possible explosion, due to the unknown condition of damaged fuzes, they worked for five hours and succeeded in defusing the damaged shells, removed the detonators and cartridges, and thus rendered all the filled shells in the shop safe for handling. Both men showed courage and initiative and by their efforts enabled production to be resumed with the least possible delay.	1942
James Thomas Annis Scott	Foreman, Civil Defence Rescue Service, South Shields	On 2 October 1941, a building was demolished by high explosive bombs, and six people trapped. Despite a concentration of coal gas from a main line, and possible collapse of heavy masonry, lowered head-first into a cellar. He rescued three persons, before searching and locating two more. Finding a buried sixth person, without hesitation, positioned himself to hold unsafe debris back until she was removed. 'Acted with great courage in extremely dangerous circumstances'.	1942
Alexander McGregor Shields	Acting Corporal, Royal Canadian Ordnance Corps, 2nd Canadian Mobile Laundry and Bath Unit	On 14 October 1944, at 1030 hours a rocket bomb fell and exploded on the laundry and bath plant of the 2nd Canadian Mobile Laundry and Bath Unit, Royal Canadian Ordnance Corps (at Castle Delft, Antwerp, Belgium), killing twelve men and seriously wounding twenty-nine others. Shields rescued a number of the wounded from a burning trailer in which petrol tanks were being enveloped in flames and further explosions were expected momentarily. His presence of mind saved many who were trapped and slowly being suffocated by flames and gas.	
William Sigsworth	Manager, Anglo-American Oil Co. Ltd.	On 1 July 1940 Salt End, East Riding of Yorkshire (five miles east of Kingston upon Hull) suffered the very first daylight raid on mainland Britain, when between 16:40 and 17:00 a German aircraft dropped its bombs on the oil terminal in a nuisance raid, in which the aircraft unsuccessfully attacked several barrage balloons. Shrapnel from the bomb punctured a 2,500 ton holding tank and the leaking petrol caught fire and threatened to cause adjacent tanks to explode. The courageous effort of depot staff and fire brigades prevented a major disaster.	1940
John Andrew Sinclair	Acting Corporal, Royal Air Force Volunteer Reserve	In 1943 the fully fuelled Wellington bomber, that Sinclair was flying in crashed and burst into flames on takeoff. Sinclair twice re-entered the burning aircraft to rescue two Polish airmen trapped inside.	1944
Liv Grannes Sjøberg	Agent, Special Operations Executive	A Norwegian. In 1940 she was employed as an office lady at the police station in Mosjøen in Norway. As a woman at the police station, she had a unique opportunity to provide assistance to the resistance during the Second World War. From the spring of 1941 she was a permanent agent for the British in the Special Operations Executive, SOE, which conducted resistance work on Helgeland. Much of the work was related to the planning of a British landing on Helgeland. She had to flee to Sweden in 1942 and on to England. Here she continued the resistance work. In 1946, Liv Sjøberg, as she was then called, was decorated with Georg's medal by the British ambassador in Oslo.	1946
Krystyna Skarbek	F Section, Special Operations Executive	Skarbek (serving under the name "Christine Granville") was parachuted into southern France in July 1944. When three members of her group were arrested by the Gestapo, Granville, using a mixture of threats and bribery convinced them to release the prisoners, who were about to be shot. For her "nerve, coolness, and devotion to duty and high courage" she was recommended for the George Cross.	1947
Frederick James Skelton	Company officer, London Auxiliary Fire Service	Posted at the outbreak of war to Deptford, London, he saw the blitz on London Docks. In September, 1940, whilst attempting to rescue colleagues trapped by fire, Company Officer Skelton received severe burns which put him in hospital for three months. For his gallant attempt, he was awarded the George Medal.	1941
Edward Heslop Smith	Chief ARP Warden of Poplar (later Mayor of Poplar)	Awarded GM for climbing into a burning building to shut off a broken and burning main gas line on 29 December 1940.	1941
Nelson Bernard Edward Smith	Lieutenant (later Lieutenant Commander), Royal Naval Volunteer Reserve	Awarded GM for gallantry and undaunted devotion to duty. In March 1941, he rendered safe 8 bombs in London during short period including one against archway of a Thames bridge.	1941
William Thomas Elinor Spain	Police Constable - Folkestone Borough Police Force	Awarded GM for bravery. He joined the Police in 1913 and retired injured in 1943. On 26 August 1940, he rescued a woman pinned under debris at Marine Terrace, Fokestone after the area had been bombed. He managed to extricate her from beneath a 2-story brick wall which was still standing.. As they both got away the wall collapsed.	1940
Alfred George Spencer	Flight Lieutenant, Royal Air Force Volunteer Reserve	In February 1944, an aircraft, carrying a 500 pounds (230 kg) bomb and incendiaries, crashed near a Royal Air Force Station, and immediately caught fire. Flying Officer Albert Arthur, a gunnery instructor, attempted to rescue the crew, and shortly afterwards was joined by Flight Lieutenant Spencer, the station medical officer. Arthur entered the burning aircraft four times before being driven back by the heat and flames, badly burnt. Spencer stayed close at hand and searched in the wreckage for survivors. It was not until the bomb was red hot and Spencer was certain that the crew must be dead that they abandoned their efforts. They then cleared the area just before the bomb exploded.	1944
Benjamin Ralph Clive Stevens	Sector Warden, Civil Defence Service	For extracting a woman and her husband trapped under heavy debris from a bombed building which had collapsed.	1941
Maurice Anthony Sullivan	Sergeant, Royal Australian Air Force, No. 7 Squadron	In November 1941 when his aircraft crashed and burst into flames, Sergeant Sullivan, the rear gunner, climbed out of his turret. With the assistance of two soldiers who arrived on the scene he then repeatedly re-entered the burning aircraft to rescue members of his crew trapped or injured inside.	1942
Frederick Albert Spicer	Constable, Liverpool City Police	During an air raid a dock shed caught fire. The shed contained a cargo of army stores, including explosives. Immediately outside were railway trucks loaded with ammunition and moored alongside the quay was a motor vessel containing a similar cargo. The fire spread rapidly towards the stores and the ship. Constables Green and Spicer gave directions for the ship to be moored on the other side of the dock, cast off the mooring ropes and then began the gigantic task of removing ammunition and stores to a safe place. A Police party arrived and the ammunition trucks were pushed out of the direction of the fire, guns and gun limbers were dragged out of the shed and tins of kerosene and the ammunition were taken away on hand trucks. During this time the area was a constant target for enemy bombers and burning debris fell alt around the workers. Constables Green and Spicer showed great courage and tenacity and by their efforts valuable stores and plant were saved.	1941
Hugh Randall Syme	Lieutenant, Royal Australian Naval Volunteer Reserve, HMS Vernon	His first George Medal was awarded in June 1941 for dealing with a series of ten mines. In June 1942 he was awarded a second for disarming a mine buried deep in clay in a reservoir embankment at Primrose Hill, London. In 1943 he was awarded the George Cross.	1941; 1942
Gillian Kluane Tanner	Auxiliary, Auxiliary Fire Service	For delivering petrol and refuelling fire appliances during bombing raids in the London docks in September 1940.	1941
Alexander Charles Thomas	Lieutenant, Corps of Royal Engineers	He was engaged for seven continuous days of intensive bomb disposal operations following the enemy air raids on Grimsby and Cleethorpes on 14 June 1943. This raid was the first of its kind (using butterfly bombs) and presented many new problems in bomb disposal. Throughout these operations Thomas contributed greatly to their success by his outstanding example of resourcefulness, courage and leadership.	1943
Michael Hilary Reuel Tolkien	Officer Cadet, Royal Air Force	Awarded "for gallantry when on defence duty during a heavy bombing attack on an RAF Station".	1941
Charles William Lovelace Tozer	Patrol Leader, Aston Home Guard	During an air raid on 26 October 1940 Tozer and Section Leader Alfred Henry George Brunges entered a basement air raid shelter which had been destroyed by a bomb. The shelter was rapidly filling with water from a broken main, and heavy bombs were falling in the vicinity, but Brunges and Tozer removed loose beams and debris with their bare hands until between fifteen and twenty people had been extricated, about half of them still alive. The two men only stopped when it was impossible to discover any further people.	1941
Clifford Turner	Leading Fireman, Kingston upon Hull Fire Brigade	On 1 July 1940 Salt End, East Riding of Yorkshire (five miles east of Kingston upon Hull) suffered the very first daylight raid on mainland Britain, when between 16:40 and 17:00 a German aircraft dropped its bombs on the oil terminal in a nuisance raid, in which the aircraft unsuccessfully attacked several barrage balloons. Shrapnel from the bomb punctured a 2,500 ton holding tank and the leaking petrol caught fire and threatened to cause adjacent tanks to explode. The courageous effort of depot staff and fire brigades prevented a major disaster.	1940
Keith Swan Upton	Lieutenant, Royal Australian Naval Volunteer Reserve	As a mine clearer, showed 'the highest courage, devotion to duty and remarkable ingenuity, his initiative and gallantry marking him out among the personnel of this special section'. He was working with Lieutenant Kessack GM at the time when Kessack's bomb exploded while being defused. A resident of Melbourne, Victoria, and post-war, Brisbane.	1941
Lionel Van Praag	Sergeant, Royal Australian Air Force	On 26 January 1942 Van Praag was the co-pilot of a Douglas DC-2 which was attacked by two Japanese fighters and forced down into the Sumba Strait, Indonesia. The aircraft soon sank, leaving Van Praag, his pilot Flying Officer Noel Wilson Webster, and two other crewmen in open water. Webster gave his life-jacket to a crewman who could not swim, while the other was semi-conscious, having been injured in the crash. Webster and Van Praag managed to drag them safely to shore, but were in the water for thirty hours, during which time they beat off several attacks by sharks.	1942
Jacob Charles Vouza	Sergeant-Major (Retd.), Solomon Islands Protectorate Police, Guadalcanal	Vouza volunteered to act as a guide and scout for American troops, but was captured by the Japanese and harshly interrogated. He refused to give any information despite being tied to a tree and bayonetted in the arm, shoulder, face and stomach, and finally left for dead. He managed to free himself and crawled back to US lines where, on the verge of collapse, he reported to his senior officer before seeking medical treatment.	1942
Herbert Edgar Wadsley	Lieutenant, Royal Naval Volunteer Reserve, HMS Vernon	First awarded in 1940 for mine disposal in London. A bar was awarded in 1942 for bomb and mine disposal in Portsmouth in 1941.	1940; 1942
Nancy Wake	F Section, Special Operations Executive	For brave conduct in hazardous circumstances. Wake was living in Marseille with her French husband when the war began. After the occupation she joined the "PAT Line", organising the escape of Allied airmen. After being forced to flee to England in May 1943 she joined SOE, and was parachuted back into France in April 1944, becoming an organiser for a large group of Maquis in the Auvergne region.	1945
Neil MacSween Waldman	Acting Temporary Lieutenant-Commander, Royal Naval Reserve	Commanding minesweepers in North Africa, including the port of Tripoli, the GM was awarded for great bravery and undaunted devotion to duty.	1943
Alwyn Brunow Waters MBE	Lieutenant (temporary Captain), Corps of Royal Engineers	Conspicuous gallantry in carrying out hazardous work in a very brave manner.	1944
George Frederich Watling	Station Officer, London Fire Brigade	For displaying "bold and fearless leadership", successfully preventing flames from reaching a heavy time bomb, saving an important railway bridge.	1941
Alfred Ambrose Webster	A.R.P. Heavy Rescue Service, Manchester	After a H.E. bomb demolished a house, members of the A.R.P Heavy Rescue Service located a family of 4 trapped in a basement. After sawing through beams and rafters two adults were extricated from an opening roughly 6 feet (1.8 m) deep and 2 feet (0.61 m) wide. After hearing two children were still trapped under the debris, Webster immediately volunteered to attempt a rescue. Webster tied a rope to his legs and was lowered into the opening by men on the surface. After digging his way through the debris with his hands, he rescued a child of about twelve months. He then went down a second time, with debris falling constantly, he rescued a second child of about three years. As Webster and the child reached safety tonnes of rubble and masonry collapsed, filling the hole in which Webster had just been working.	1941
Charles Leonard Wheatley	2nd Class Airman, Royal Air Force	When an aircraft carrying a full load of bombs crashed this airman, with the help of the fire picquet, tried valiantly to prevent the fire from the port engine and petrol tank from spreading to a large high explosive bomb. The success of his efforts were due to his complete disregard of his personal safety for, standing as he did two yards in front of the bomb, he was aware that it was likely explode at any time.	1941
Dorothy May White	Red Cross Nurse	Tending to the dead and injured during an enemy air raid in Colgate, Sussex, in September 1940.	1941
George William Shears Whitmore	Police Constable	War Rescue during Blitz in East Dulwich	1941
Reginald Norman Willey	Leader, Civil Defence Rescue Service	For rescuing and saving the lives of two people buried in the debris of a bombed building, showing "great courage and endurance".	1942
James Williams	Sapper, Royal Engineers	On 14 August 1940, a 500 kg bomb fell into the electricity depot at Lyndhurst. Williams assisted the Bomb Disposal Officer in excavating the bomb and removing the fuzes, which proved to be one of the first, if not the first, No. 17 RHS 1940 clockwork mechanism fuze to be obtained, and was of great value to other Disposal Sections.	1940
Richard Frederick Festubert Williams	Lieutenant (temporary Captain), Corps of Royal Engineers	Conspicuous gallantry in carrying out hazardous work in a very brave manner.	1944
Howard Etherington Wood	Sergeant, Birmingham City Police	During an enemy air raid a building was hit by bombs. Wood and Constable Ernest Callaghan learned that six people were trapped in an underground shelter. They found one injured man, and the body of another before a partial collapse blocked the entrance to the shelter. Wood and Callaghan cleared debris by hand, finding that the inside of the shelter had partly collapsed. They entered, and were joined by Hughes, a civilian, in recovering survivors. The upper floors of the steel-framed building contained heavy machinery, and could have collapsed at any moment, and enemy aircraft were still dropping bombs nearby. Callaghan and Hughes received the British Empire Medal.	1942
James Kerr Woodrow	Lieutenant (later Acting Lieutenant-Commander), Royal Naval Volunteer Reserve	First awarded for mine disposal in the UK between 1942 and 1943. A bar was awarded for disposing of damaged ammunition in the magazines of HMS Thane, January–February 1945, after she had been torpedoed.	1944; 1945
Edward Dutton Woolley	Lieutenant, Royal Naval Volunteer Reserve	First awarded in 1941 for dealing with a mine on the third storey of a flour mill in London's Docklands in October 1940. The fuze clock restarted twice, but the mine was rendered safe. A bar was awarded after he was sent to Malta where he not only rendered safe bombs and mines, but also handled Italian human torpedoes and explosive motor boats.	1941; 1942
Lawrence Barclay Young	Newcastle-Upon-Tyne Police Fire Brigade	On 31 May 1941 in Tarset Street, Newcastle, 7 year old Irene Page fell into a cavity left by an earlier bomb and succumbed to fumes trapped inside, thought to be carbon monoxide. 12 year old Boy Scout Ernest Smith went down into the crater to rescue her but was also overcome, as were two auxiliary firemen, John Tulip and George Wanless, who were nearby and attempted a rescue. When the Fire Brigade arrived, Leading Fireman George Bruce attempted a rescue. Badly affected by the gas, he was rescued by Fireman Larry Young, who went into the crater three more times and recovered the bodies. Despite being badly affected by the gas, Larry Young helped apply mouth to mouth resuscitation to the casualties until they were taken to hospital. Larry Young was awarded the George Medal for his gallantry. Ernest Smith received the Boy Scouts' Bronze Cross for bravery; George Wanless and George Bruce also received commendations for gallantry.	1941

== Other ==
Name	Rank and Unit	Action/Citation	Year awarded
Chandrachur Deva	NA	Fighting off a gang of dacoits in Begusarai district and sacrificing his left eye in the fight	1942
Harold Bending	Fitter-driver, London Airport	For rescuing survivors of the 1948 Heathrow Disaster.	1948
Angus Brown	Radio mechanic, London Airport	For rescuing survivors of the 1948 Heathrow Disaster.	1948
William Maurice Brown	Sub-officer, Cardiff Fire Brigade	For bravery in fire-fighting in West Wales.	1941
Daniel James Collins	Sergeant, Cardiff Fire Brigade	For bravery in fire-fighting in West Wales. Previously awarded other bravery medals.	1941
Guy D'Artois	Captain, Canadian Army, Royal 22e Régiment	For participating in an Arctic rescue mission with the Canadian Special Air Service Company in 1947.	1948
Yehuda Issaharoff	Royal Air Force	Services in Palestine.	1943
Robert Duff Grigor Ross	Lieutenant, The King's Own Scottish Borderers	Services in Palestine.	1948
Edward Alfred Smith	Sergeant, Palestine Police Force	For gallantry following the bombing of the King David Hotel, Jerusalem, on 22 July 1946, where he rescued three British soldiers buried in the rubble by digging a tunnel. He worked at great personal risk for six hours in intense heat.	1946
Botalage Edmund Perera	House Servant, Kimbulapitiya Estate, Negombo, Ceylon.	For rescuing four crewmen from a burning aircraft following its crash landing.	1946

== See also ==
- List of recipients of the George Medal for other decades
