= Johannes S. Andersen =

Norwegian WWII resistance fighter

Johannes Sigfred Andersen
- Born: 9 July 1898; Kristiania, Norway
- Died: 29 July 1970 (aged 72)
- Burial place: Horten, Norway
- Spouses: Lovise Kristine Klausen (m. 1916; div. 1931) Ruth Johanne Andersen (m. 1939; died 1944): Hertha Bergstrøm (post-war)
- Military career
- Allegiance: Norway
- Branch: Norwegian resistance movement SOE; Royal Norwegian Navy
- Service years: 1940–1945
- Nicknames: "Gulosten" (English: "The Yellow Cheese")
- Unit: Norwegian Independent Company 1
- Conflicts: Operation Bittern
- Other work: Sailor; Mason's assistant Smuggler; Burglar; Factory owner

Johannes Sigfred Andersen (9 July 1898 – 29 July 1970) was a Norwegian resistance fighter during the Second World War, a member of the Norwegian Independent Company 1 (NOR.I.C.1). He was nicknamed "Gulosten"; 'The Yellow Cheese'. He also used the surname Ostein during the war. Andersen was a controversial character, because of his pre-war life as a well-known career criminal and a series of incidents that occurred during the war years. These incidents included Andersen working as an assassin during the war, and shortly after the war killing two German prisoners of war during a drinking binge. After the war, Andersen started a wood furniture business. He was supported financially by King Haakon VII of Norway, whose friendship he had gained during the war. Andersen was repeatedly accused of crimes after the war, and on one occasion convicted.

== Early life ==
Andersen was born on 9 July 1898 in Kristiania (now Oslo), and had a difficult childhood, the latter part of it in an orphanage. He was the son of construction worker Ole Andersen and Josefine Hansen. Soon after Johannes was born, Norway entered a period of economic difficulties, with little construction work available. This led to his father having to change jobs from mason to milkman. Johannes' mother became obsessed with religion.

=== Institutionalization ===
At age 10 Johannes was declared a ward of court and sent to the school institution Toftes gave on the island Helgøya in the lake Mjøsa. While at the strict institution Johannes received parcels from home, with yellow cheese. The cheese was needed because of the meagre rations given the boys at Toftes gave. The parcels with yellow cheese led to Johannes being given the nickname "Gulosten" (English: "The Yellow Cheese") by the other boys at the institution, a name that stuck with him for the rest of his life. After four years on Helgøya he was transferred to Bastøy school home for maladjusted boys, an equally harsh institution. When 29 boys rebelled at Bastøy in 1915, police officers and the Norwegian Armed Forces were employed to crush the riot, and the leaders taken away in handcuffs. Physical punishment was common at Bastøy, including being locked away in a dark cellar, a punishment Johannes had to endure. When Johannes was 15 his mother died, and he was not informed until several days after her funeral. This led to him making suicide threats and going amok at the warden's office, for which he was punished with a stay in the dark cell.

=== Leaving Helgøya ===
Andersen went to sea at age 15, and later found work as a mason's assistant. On 7 November 1916 he married Lovise Kristine Klausen, who worked as a waitress at a restaurant frequented by Andersen. They soon got an apartment at Torshov and had a son. Andersen got a better-paid job, laying the foundation for the headquarters of Oslo Lysverker, but when that job was done he had to seek day-to-day work at the harbour. After an upturn during the First World War, Norway's financial situation again turned for the worse, no-one would hire a man with an institutional background, and he was out of work. He made a last-ditch attempt to make money, buying liquor in Tønsberg and selling it on the black market in Kristiania, but this was not enough for his wife, who left him to pursue a more financially secure future.

It has been written that the marriage did not end until 1931. In the meantime, Andersen befriended a woman named Nancy. She helped hide him when he was wanted by the authorities, she lied during a police interrogation at Møllergata 19 to cover for him and she also helped him with practical things such as acquiring a passport. They agreed to part ways when Andersen decided to pursue a trapper career in Canada; when going to visit her one last time he stumbled upon a police officer who recognized him and arrested him. Also, when frequenting Hamburg, Andersen spent time with two prostitutes. They were described as "not [...] extraordinarily beautiful", and Andersen helped them with buying food.

== Criminal career ==
Norway's prohibition from 1916 onwards opened up possibilities for a lucrative criminal career, and Andersen joined up in 1921 with old friends from his days at Toftes gave in grand-scale smuggling operations. Using ingenious methods for hiding the spirits, they smuggled alcohol into Norway by sea. In his smuggling years Andersen cooperated with future award-winning author Arthur Omre, serving as both crew and skipper on Omre's boats before getting his own smuggling vessel. Eventually his cover was blown, and being a wanted man in Norway he had to flee to Germany. While in Germany he worked for one of the biggest suppliers of spirits for the illegal Norwegian market. In 1925 Norway requested that Germany extradite him, and he was arrested in the harbour of Hamburg. Prison life was harsh, but Andersen managed to get transferred to a hospital when faking syphilis by burning his member with a cigarette. He was then deported under police escort back to Norway on the steamship Kong Dag, but when the ship entered the Oslofjord, Andersen escaped by jumping overboard near Spro. For several months he was on the run before being recaptured. In the years that followed he was in and out of prison repeatedly. He gained considerable renown for his elegantly executed burglaries, being labelled by the media "gentleman-forbryter i Grünerløkka-utgave" (English: gentleman criminal, Grünerløkka edition). He was also well known for his safe-cracking skills. Andersen once more tried to evade justice when he fled a crowded court room in Drammen in 1929, jumping out a window as the sentence was being proclaimed. He was then smuggled from Drammen inside a chest of drawers which was to be repaired in Oslo. He was recaptured shortly before intending to board a cargo ship bound for Canada.

His criminal escapades made Andersen a national celebrity in pre-war Norway, and his nickname "Gulosten" a household name. Between 1919 and 1937 he was sentenced to prison terms nine times, spending a total of around seven years behind bars. During the mid-1930s Andersen attempted to end his criminal career, became engaged, and started a furniture repair business. He remarried on 18 March 1939, wedding Ruth Johanne (born 1905), née Nilsen. They had one son. In 1935 Andersen attempted to get a children's book published, but it was rejected because of its inclusion of a number of "brutal scenes, unsuited for youths". The nature scenes in the book were, however, commended by the reviewer. After yet another spell in prison, Andersen was released on 9 April 1940, the day Germany invaded Norway as a part of World War II.

== Second World War ==
=== Early resistance work ===
The German invasion of Norway in 1940 led to Andersen's life once more taking a turn into illegal activities. His furniture workshop was used as a weapons depot by the Norwegian resistance movement, and he took part in looting German military stores. He was first arrested by the Germans after he had responded to rumours that he was a Nazi by writing the Norwegian national socialist party Nasjonal Samling's official publication Fritt Folk and stating that "although I have done many wrong things in my life, a Nazi I am not. Yours sincerely Johs. S. Andersen". (Note: Norwegian: Vel har jeg gjort mye galt i min tid, men nazist er jeg ikke. Ærbødigst Johs. S. Andersen Ulateig 1996: 18) The letter was published unedited by the newspaper, although Andersen was later arrested by the occupying authorities and sentenced to one year in prison, after spending half a year in detention. Using techniques he had learned during his earlier criminal career, Andersen managed to be transferred to prison hospital during his time in detention. While there he acquired false x-ray images and tuberculosis germs to fake illnesses in other captured resistance men who were on their way to interrogation. He also infected a German interrogator with malaria by contaminating his insulin. At night, he would sneak out of the hospital and operate in Oslo, amongst other activities breaking into Nasjonal Samling offices and stealing documents, copying them and having them shipped to the United Kingdom together with evidence of torture in Nazi-run prisons. He served the last part of his sentence in Fuhlsbüttel near Hamburg, Germany. His wife was also active in resistance work, dealing with propaganda and espionage. Author Egil Ulateig doubts the veracity of Andersen's prison exploits, which are based mostly on Andersen's own testimony.

=== Assassin, SOE agent and naval rating ===
After his return to Norway in 1942, Andersen carried out the assassination of well-known informer Raymond Colberg and then made good his escape to Sweden. Colberg had been active in the Sandefjord area, uncovering an illegal radio transmitter. This led to the arrest of eight resistance members in March 1941, three of whom were executed (Øivind Ask, Andreas Bertnes and Johan Midttun were shot 4 December 1941). Andersen carried out the assassination of the Abwehr agent together with his wife and two acquaintances, kidnapping him and killing him in the basement of the Oslo animal hospital Cheval. According to Ruth Andersen's later interrogation records, the killing was carried out by crucifying him with four knives and crushing his bones with iron pipes, then dismembering the body, putting it in a container for animal carcasses and dumping it in the river Akerselva. The confession may have been made under torture, and included no reference to the bullet holes found on Colberg's corpse when it was recovered. According to historian and leader of Norway's Resistance Museum, Arnfinn Moland, the claims of Colberg having been tortured and mutilated are fabrications. Moland cites autopsy reports and German archives to back up his claims. Colberg's body was discovered by a Norwegian civilian on 15 June 1942 with two 7,62 mm calibre bullet holes in the head, and was identified through Colberg's dental records. The killing was, according to Ulateig, also motivated by Andersen's personal feelings towards Colberg, and Moland states that Andersen "may have had" such motives, a claim that is refuted by history professor Tore Pryser.

Andersen then fled to Sweden, and travelled on to the United Kingdom, where he was recruited by Professor Leif Tronstad for work with the British Special Operations Executive. In this context he used the surname Ostein during the war. In the United Kingdom, Andersen suggested a series of further assassinations in Oslo, naming targets and describing plans for how to carry out the killings. The British saw great potential as an agent in a man with Andersen's background. Andersen and his group was parachuted from a Halifax bomber to Kjerkeberget near Sandungen in Nordmarka, Oslo. Received by Gunnar Sønsteby and Sverre Ellingsen, this was the first parachute drop received by the resistance group Milorg's District 13. The group spent a month training Milorg resistance people in weapons handling. They were originally intended to carry out assassinations of leading Norwegian Nazis and informers as part of Operation Bittern, first and foremost police minister and Germanske SS Norge leader Jonas Lie, but this was refused by the local resistance leaders because of fears of reprisals. Andersen had suggested killing the top-ranking Nazi leader, and the SOE approved. According to a plan formulated by the SOE, Andersen was to don a light suit, enter Lie's office in broad daylight, shoot the police minister in the head with a Colt pistol, change to a dark suit hidden underneath the light one, and disappear in the confusion. Andersen commented on the SOE plan: "Lie might survive this assassination attempt, but I won't." (Note: Norwegian: Dette attentatforsøket vil muligens Lie overleve, men ikke jeg. Ulateig 1996: 24) Andersen instead wanted to kill Lie on his way from the office to his home. The Bittern operation was severely criticized by the Norwegian Home Forces in a letter to the Norwegian exile government in London.

Andersen returned to the United Kingdom via Sweden, after episodes of unruly behaviour in Oslo. In the United Kingdom he had a personal audience with King Haakon VII of Norway. During the audience, Andersen and the King lunched at the Norwegian Club in London, and Andersen entertained the exiled monarch with stories. The King promised to take care of Andersen once the war was over. Andersen then joined the exiled Royal Norwegian Navy and served on a Motor Torpedo Boat (MTB) for the duration of the war. The MTB on which Andersen served repeatedly attacked shipping off the Norwegian coast.

Many resistance people in Norway had been shocked when they found out that Andersen had been allowed to serve in NOR.I.C.1. Leading saboteur Max Manus wrote shortly after the war in his book Det vil helst gå godt: "It was one hell of a risk to send a man with Gulosten's reputation and history out on secret military missions. It would have been a great embarrassment if Fritt Folk had been able to publish that Gulosten made a career in King Håkon's armed forces". (Note: Norwegian: Det var en jevli risk å sende en mann med Gulostens rykte og fortid på hemmelig militært oppdrag. Det ville blitt en meget pinlig historie om Fritt Folk hadde kunne publisere at Gulosten hadde laget karriere i Kong Håkons væpnede styrker. Ulateig 1996: 25. Manus 1945: 192) Andersen protested against Manus' account when it was published.

== Post-war life ==
=== Loss of wife and third marriage ===
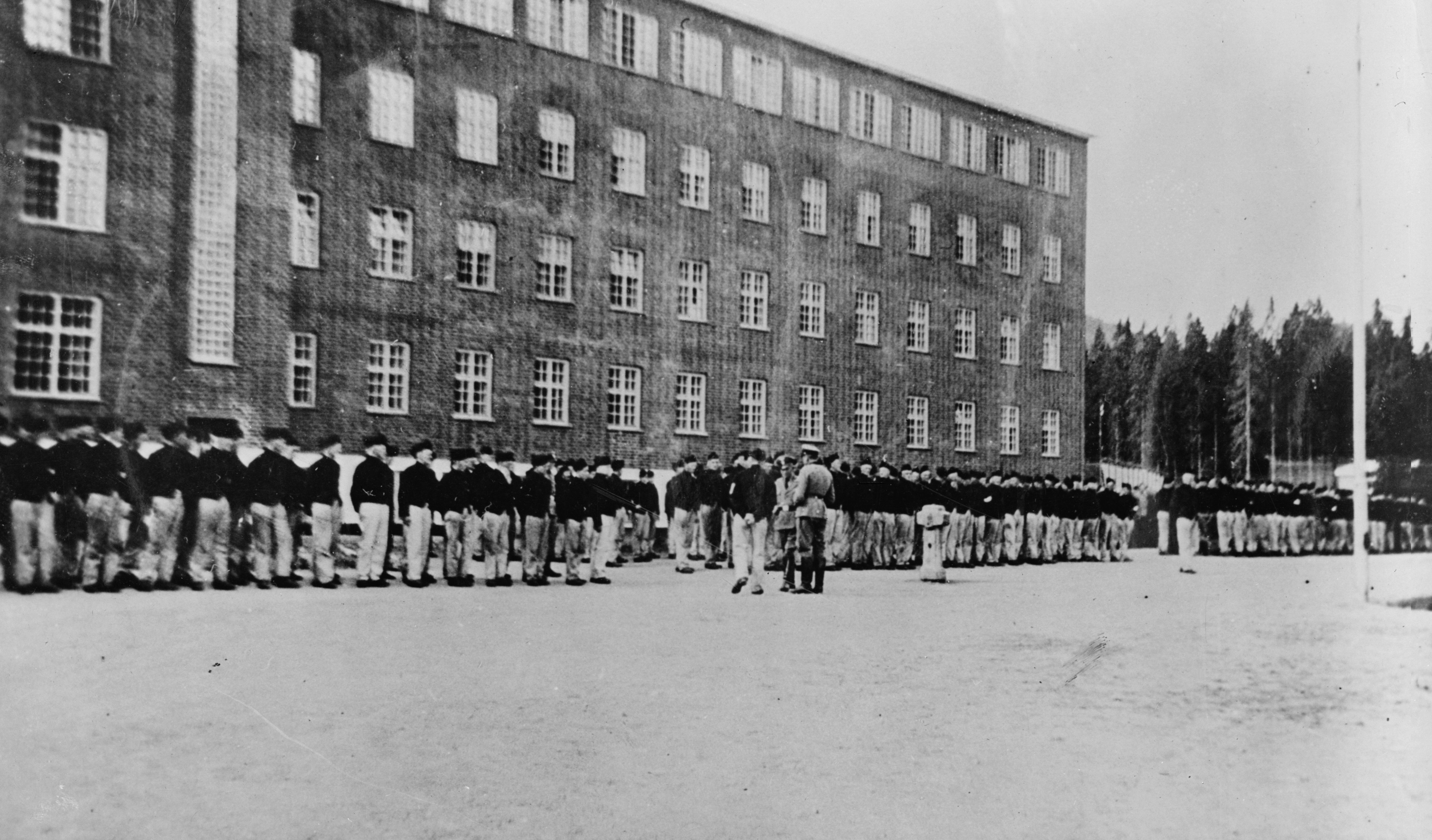
Grini detention camp, around 1941-43

When Andersen returned to Norway after the German surrender in 1945, he had hoped to reunite with his wife Ruth. Instead, he discovered that his wife had been arrested by the Germans on 9 May 1944. She had been taken to Møllergata 19, tortured during her captivity and executed at Grini detention camp by Sonderkommando Hans on 21 July 1944 together with five others. They were buried in a mass grave but her body was exhumed and identified on 25 May 1945. Ruth's sister together with Ruth's friend Hertha Bergstrøm organized a proper funeral. Andersen and Bergstrøm later married.

=== POW killing controversy ===
On 3 July 1945 Andersen killed two German prisoners of war with his Thompson submachine gun. Andersen had broken into German barracks in Vadheim in Sogn during a drinking binge, killing the German soldiers Herbert Neumann and Hermann Beckmann. He later claimed to have acted in rage over his wife's death. The Norwegian court system started working on Andersen's case, eventually reaching judge advocate Ivar Follestad. Andersen was defended by Reidar Skau, who was made Supreme Court Justice in 1945. Follestad deemed it necessary to prosecute Andersen, but wanted to pardon him after the verdict. After spending more than a year in the civilian and military court systems Andersen's murder case reached the top levels of the Royal Norwegian Navy, and on 5 August 1946 it was decided to take the case to the Gulating Military Court of Appeal. Three months later Follestad made a decision of non-indictment, despite there being evidence to convict Andersen. In January 1947 the general jurisdiction chief, Thore Horve, also declared for a decision of non-indictment. Follestad and Horve were supported in this by Minister of Defence Jens Christian Hauge, and the decision was made final by royal resolution on 25 April 1947. This led to protests from, amongst others, leading Norwegian psychiatrist Johan Scharffenberg.

=== Later life ===
With starting help from his new wife, Andersen started the wood product factory Apenes Trevarefabrikk in Horten, running it for fifteen years. King Haakon VII personally helped him with money and credit, remaining Andersen's friend and patron the rest of the king's life. One time, Andersen's company was hired to perform maintenance work on the Bygdøy Royal Estate. He eventually had to retire because of health problems sustained during the war.

Andersen was accused of crimes on several occasions in the post-war years, but was most often acquitted in court. Amongst the crimes of which he was charged but acquitted in court was the theft of building materials in 1954. Another time he was tricked into lending his car to two people who broke into a goldsmith's shop in Tønsberg. Strongly intoxicated at the time of the crime, he was charged but fully acquitted. In 1955 he was, however, convicted and sentenced to 36 days in prison for selling 30 bottles of denatured alcohol, alcohol that was supposed to have been used at his factory.

In his later years Andersen became involved in speaking about children's rights and correctional institutions. He called the institutions for maladjusted youths "schools for criminals", and said that the loss and suffering of institutionalization naturally lead youths to crime, using his own life as an example. To explain his views on incarceration and of society's response to institutionalized children and ex-convicts Andersen said: "You are to be punished for having been punished." (Note: Norwegian: Man skal straffes for å ha vært straffet. Ulateig 1996: 15) Johannes "The Yellow Cheese" Andersen died on 29 July 1970, aged 72. He was buried in Horten.

In late 1968 the book En mann kalt Gulosten was released, written by Bjørn Bjørnsen. Already before the book was released, film rights for the story were bought by the company Teamfilm. Teamfilm employee Knut Bohwim stated that the book contained enough material for three motion pictures, but that they would concentrate the story into one film at best.

== Works ==
- —— (1946). Vi kommer oss. Av Gulostens memoarer. (autobiography)
