= Operation Bittern =

Operation Bittern (Norwegian: Bittern-ekspedisjonen, known as Bitern in the oldest sources) was a military operation in occupied Norway planned and carried out in 1942 by the British Special Operations Executive (SOE) and the Norwegian government-in-exile in London.

Four SOE agents and instructors—Thor Helliessen, Jan Allan, Ruben Langmo and Johannes S. Andersen—were sent to Norway and parachuted into Nordmarka north of Oslo in October 1942. Their primary mission was to help the resistance movement Milorg with the assassinations of Norwegian Nazis and informers by training selected Milorg personnel for the task. If asked by Milorg they would also help as executioners. According to Chief of Defence, General Wilhelm von Tangen Hansteen, the group should only act upon decisions by the Home Forces, and they brought no liquidation lists from the UK. The problem was that the operation had not been approved by Milorg in advance. In a meeting between Milorg leaders Jens Christian Hauge and Arthur Hansson and the expedition leader, it turned out that Bittern operated with a list of persons that SOE wanted to get rid of. The list contained 62 names, which not only included informers and torturers, but also Nazi politicians such as the government "ministers" Hagelin, Lie and Fuglesang. Milorg feared that the reprisals might be terribly harsh compared with the benefits of such assassinations, based on recent experience from Telavåg and Majavatn. It was decided that the agents should be used as instructors for military training and hand-to-hand combat, and the four persons were split into two teams. While one team solved its tasks satisfactorily, the other team's behaviour led to a scandal. After episodes of heavy drinking, too much talking, and other hazardous behaviour, Milorg demanded the two SOE agents to be recalled to the United Kingdom.

Operation Bittern was severely criticized by the Norwegian Home Forces in letters and other communications to the Norwegian government-in-exile in London. The government in London was distinctly unimpressed that SOE, with the tacit acceptance of Norwegian High Command, had selected a former notorious criminal to take part in such a task. The incidents led to a long-lasting conflict between Milorg, the government-in-exile and SOE, although eventually a more cooperative climate developed between them.
