= Harry Errington =

Harry Errington GC
- Born: 20 August 1910; Westminster, England
- Died: 15 December 2004 (aged 94); Clapham, England
- Known for: Only London firefighter to be awarded the George Cross during the Second World War
- Awards: George Cross

Harry Errington GC (20 August 1910 – 15 December 2004) was the only London firefighter to be awarded the George Cross during the Second World War.

He was born in Westminster on 20 August 1910 to a family of Polish Jewish immigrants, previously named Ehrengott. He first trained as an engraver and later as a tailor. When war broke out he volunteered as an auxiliary fireman at a station on Shaftesbury Avenue, near the business where he worked.

On 17 September 1940 during The Blitz, a bomb demolished a three-storey garage being occupied by the London Auxiliary Fire Service. The basement of the building was being used as an air raid shelter and took the full force of the collapsing floors. Twenty people, including six firemen, were killed. Errington recovered consciousness to find the basement shelter consumed by fire. He rescued a trapped colleague and battered his way through the debris to safety up a stone staircase. He returned to the conflagration to rescue another trapped man and, despite his badly burned hands, also carried him to safety.

Errington was later active in basketball administration (particularly during the London Olympics of 1948) and served as treasurer of The Victoria Cross and George Cross Association until 1990. His George Cross is on display in the collection of the Jewish Museum London. Errington died in London on 15 December 2004.

2020, the Jewish American Society for Historic Preservation, with support from AJEX (the Association of Jewish Ex-Servicemen and Women), placed a historical marker in the City of Westminster at the site of the bombing.

In August 2022 two new fireboats joined the London Fire Brigade, one named after Errington, and the other after fellow Second World War firefighter Gillian Tanner GM.

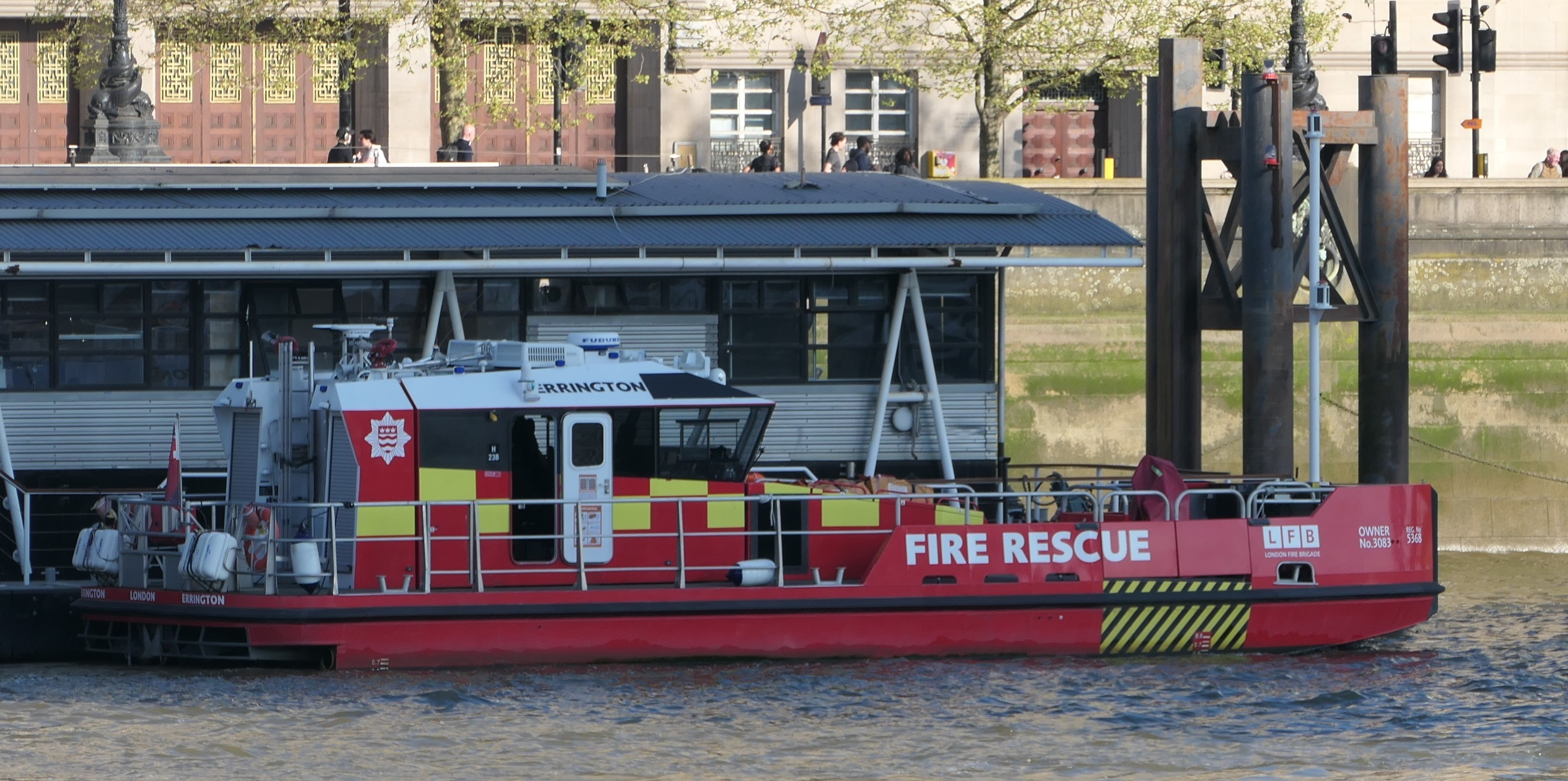
London fireboat Errington

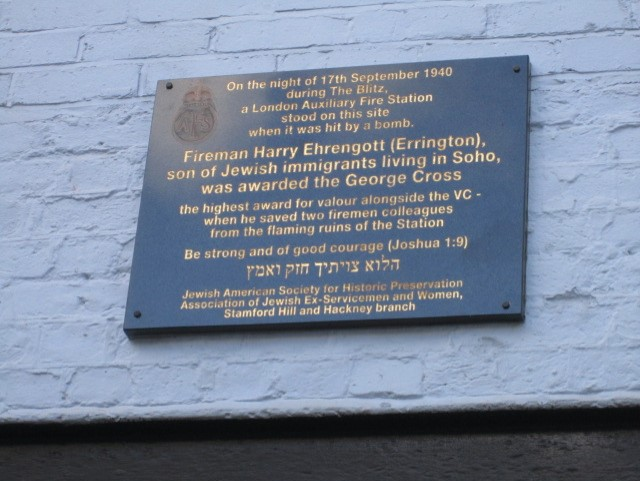
Harry Errington recipient of the George Cross during WWII Marker
