= Knut Mørch Hansson =

Norwegian actor (1920–1994)

- Born: 16 April 1920
- Died: 3 December 1994 (aged 74); Oslo Municipality
- Resting place: Vestre gravlund
- Occupation: Actor
- Spouse(s): Elisabet Jacobsen

Knut Mørch Hansson (16 April 1920 – 3 December 1994) was a Norwegian actor.

== Biography ==
Hansson was born in Alexandria on 16 April 1920, a son of judge Michael Hansson and Emilie Christensen. He was a brother of diplomat Arthur Mørch Hansson. He made his stage debut at Det Nye Teater in 1940. During the German occupation of Norway Hansson joined the Norwegian resistance movement. He was arrested and incarcerated in the Sachsenhausen concentration camp in Germany until 1945. In 1945, he continued his acting career with Studioteatret. He was later appointed at various theatres, including Det Nye Teater, Den Nationale Scene, Trøndelag Teater and Oslo Nye Teater, and with guest appearances at Riksteatret and Fjernsynsteatret. Among his film appearances are Englandsfarere from 1946 and I slik en natt from 1958. He chaired the Norwegian Actors' Equity Association from 1970 to 1974. He penned the memoirs of Herman Kahan, Ilden og lyset, in 1988, and his own memoirs in Kurer og fange from 1992.

He was father of politician Rasmus Hansson.
