= Olav Njølstad =

Norwegian historian, biographer and novelist

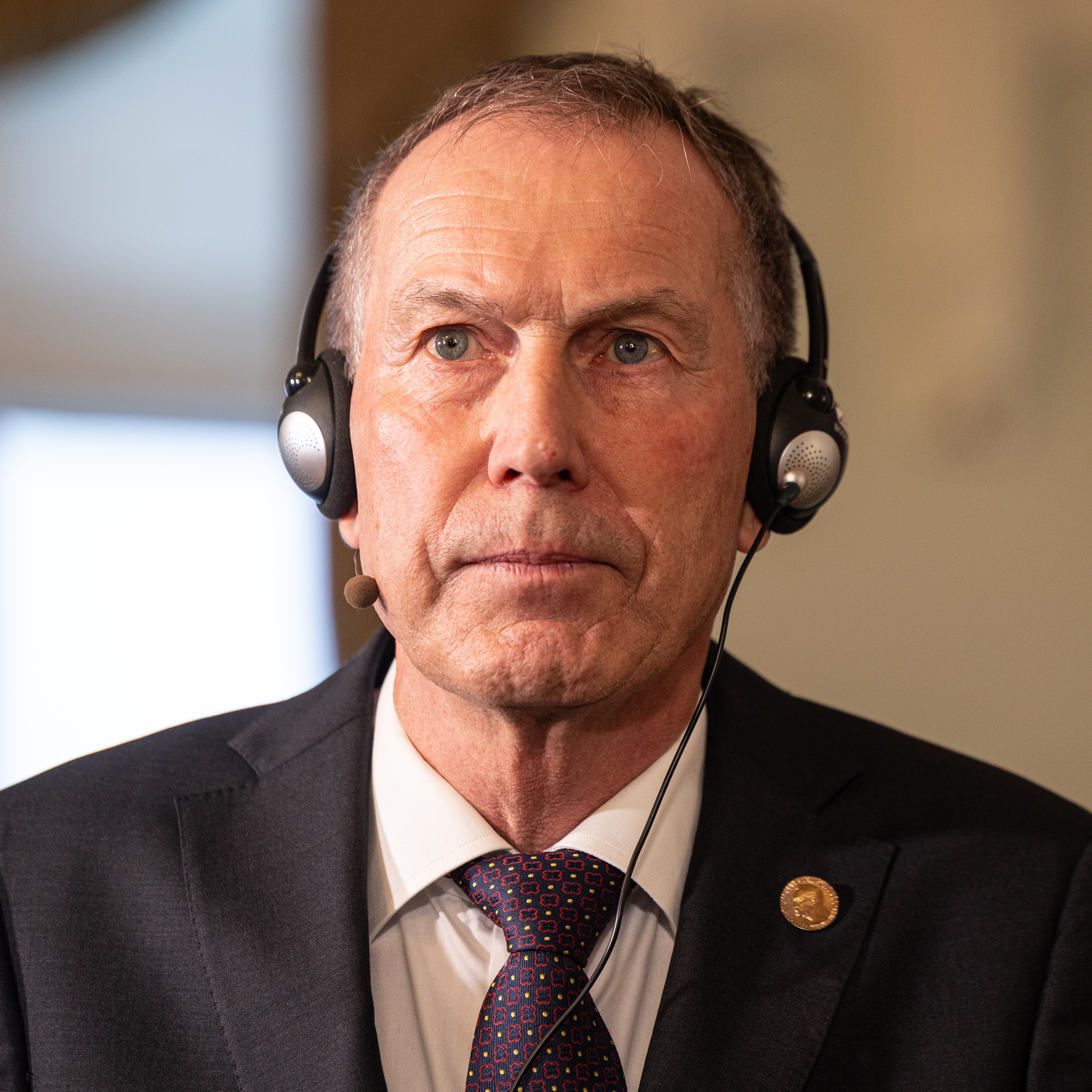
- Njølstad at 2024 Nobel Week
- Born: March 1, 1957 (age 69)
- Occupations: Historian, biographer and novelist

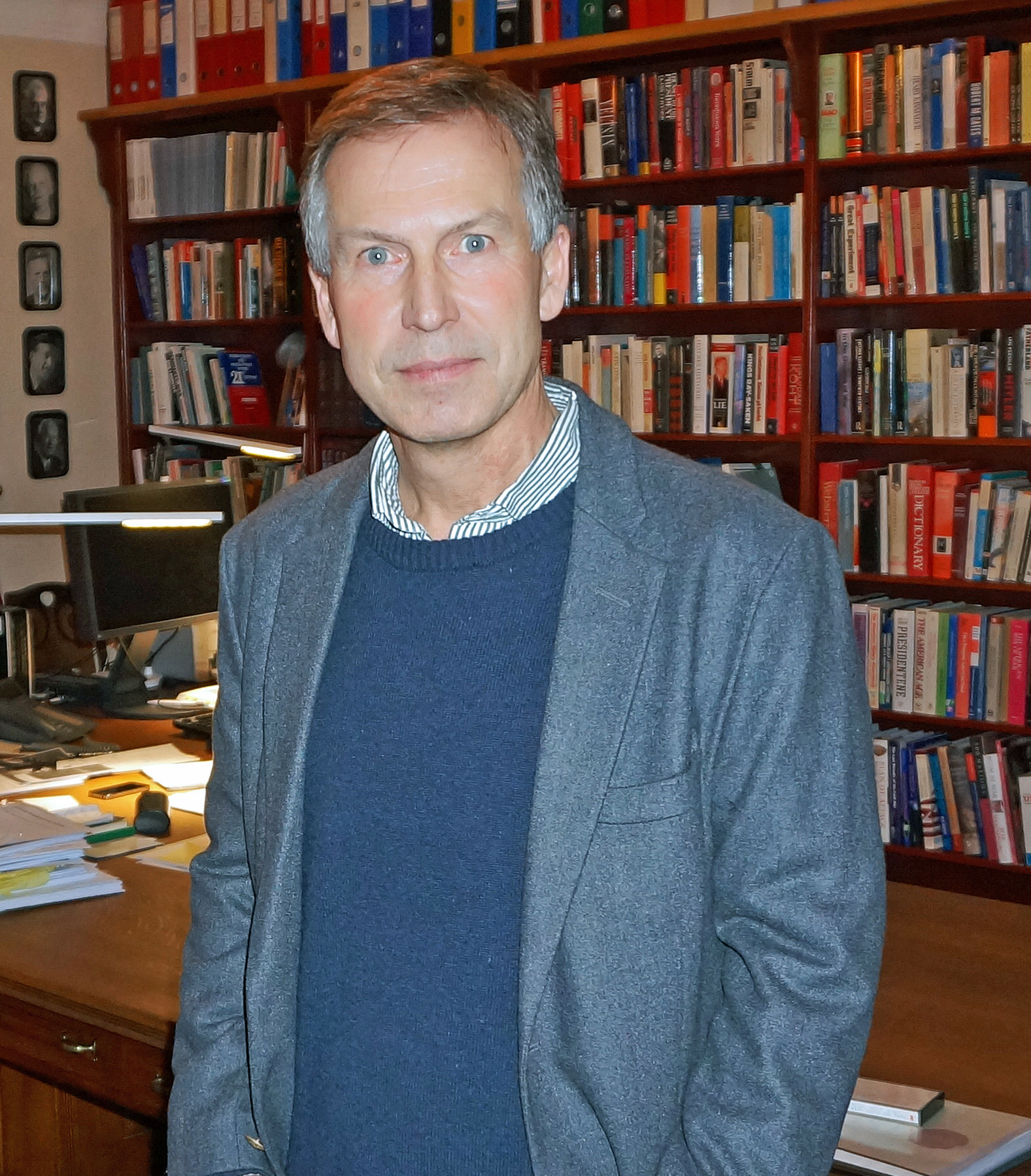
Olav Njølstad

Olav Njølstad (born 1 March 1957) is a Norwegian historian, biographer and novelist. He served as director of the Norwegian Nobel Institute from 2015 to 2025.

== Literary background ==
As a novelist he made his literary debut in 2003 with the thriller Mannen med oksehjertet, and wrote the novel Brennofferet in 2005.

His biography of resistance leader, government minister and lawyer Jens Christian Hauge (Jens Chr. Hauge – fullt og helt from 2008) was well received by critics.

== Selected works ==
- Kunnskap om våpen: forsvarets forskningsinstitutt 1946 – 1975 (1997) (With Olav Wicken)
- Strålende forskning: Institutt for energiteknikk 1948 – 1998 (1999)
- War and Peace in the 20th Century and Beyond (edited with Geir Lundestad, 2002)
- Mannen med oksehjertet (thriller, 2003)
- Brennofferet (novel, 2005)
- Norske nobelprisvinnere: fra Bjørnson til Kydland (2005)
- Jens Chr. Hauge – fullt og helt (biography, 2008)
