= Bjørn Bjørnsen =

Norwegian author and politician

- Born: 16 August 1937 (age 88); Stavanger, Norway
- Occupations: Journalist; Non-fiction writer

Bjørn Bjørnsen (born 16 August 1937) is a Norwegian journalist, non-fiction writer and politician.

== Personal life ==
He was born in Hillevåg, Stavanger to merchant Bernhard Bjørnsen (1901–75) and his wife Marie Magnusson (1902–83). In 1968, he married Torill Johnsen (1948–).

== Career ==
Bjørnsen quit school at a young age and started his journalistic career when fifteen years old. He worked as a journalist and photographer in the newspaper Stavanger Aftenblad before he in 1956 took an exam at the private Journalist Academy. He thereupon started working at the magazine Aktuell. In 1966, he published the book Abort i Norge ("Abortion in Norway") and in 1968 En mann kalt Gulosten ("A Man Nicknamed Cheese"), a biography of resistance fighter Johannes S. Andersen. He published the book Johannas verden ("Johanna's World") in 1974, which sold approximately 80,000 copies in the same year. Bjørnsen wrote two books on the history of Norway during the Second World War: Det utrolige døgnet ("The incredible day", 1977) and Narvik 1940 (1980).

Bjørnsen also authored books on the movie history of Norway. He wrote the book Filmkunnskap ("Movie Knowledge") in 1981, and Slik vi så det. 50 år gjennom kameraøyet ("The Way We Saw It. 50 Years Through the Camera Eye") in 1983. In 1969, he published Hva sensuren tok ("What the censorship took") together with Tore Erlandsen and Kjell Thon. He was editor of the cinema periodical Film og Kino from 1968 to 1975. Between 1984 and 1986, Bjørnsen wrote the 100-year history of Arbeiderbladet in two volumes. In 1990, he published the book Plutselig en dag ("A Sudden Day") on the Revolutions of 1989. He chaired The Norwegian Non-fiction Writers Association during three periods, from its foundation in 1978 to 1980, from 1982 to 1984, and from 1986 to 1988. Bjørnsen was a member of the board of the interest organisation Kopinor from 1983 to 1986. He edited Akershus Amtstidende for one year; in 1989. Between 1992 and 1998, Bjørnsen chaired the Frogn Labour Party.
