= Liv Grannes =

Norwegian resistance member (1918–2004)

Liv Elisabeth Grannes GM
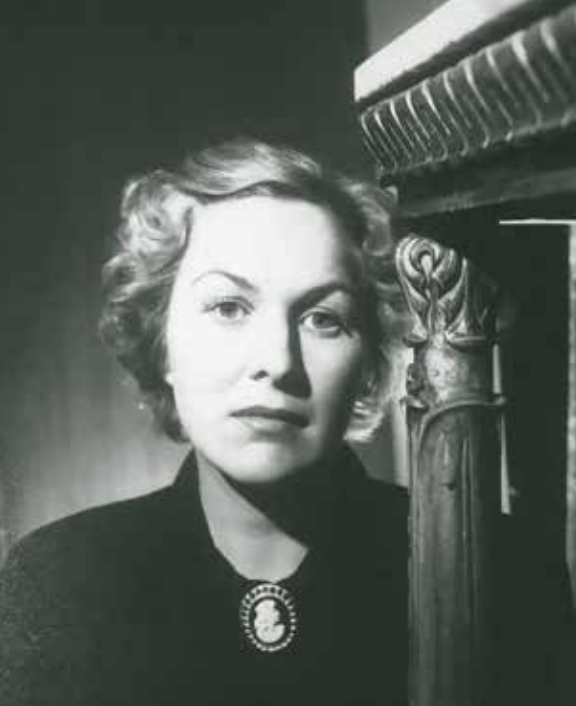
- Liv Grannes in 1940
- Nickname: 'Jeanne D`Arc of the North'
- Born: June 28, 1918; Mosjøen, Nordland, Norway
- Died: November 30, 2004 (aged 85–86) Oslo, Norway
- Buried: Nordstrand Cemetery, Oslo, Norway 59°51′33″N 10°48′10″E
- Allegiance: United Kingdom
- Branch: Special Operations Executive
- Service years: 1941 to c.1945
- Spouses: Birger Sjøberg; Jens Christian Hauge

Liv Elisabeth Grannes GM (28 June 1918 — 30 November 2004) was a Norwegian resistance member during World War II.

== Early life ==
Liv Grannes was born in Mosjøen in northern Norway on 28 June 1918. Her father, Jørgen Albert Grannes, was a teacher and organist and her mother was Emelie Anette (née Vedde). She had two younger brothers. Liv Grannes studied art at Orkdal High School, graduating in 1938.

== Resistance activities ==
In 1940, she was employed as an office lady at the police station in Mosjøen.

As a woman at the police station, she had a unique opportunity to provide assistance to the resistance during the Second World War. From the Spring of 1941 she was a permanent agent for the British Special Operations Executive (SOE), which conducted resistance work in Helgeland.

=== Activities in London ===
After the Majavas tragedy, she had to flee to Sweden in 1942 and on to England. She continued her resistance work. In London she was in 1944 married to Birger Sjøberg.

In 1946, Liv Sjøberg, as she was then called, was decorated with George Medal by the British ambassador in Oslo.

== Personal life ==
In 1958, Liv Sjøberg married the Norwegian Minister of Justice, Jens Christian Hauge.

== Death and legacy ==
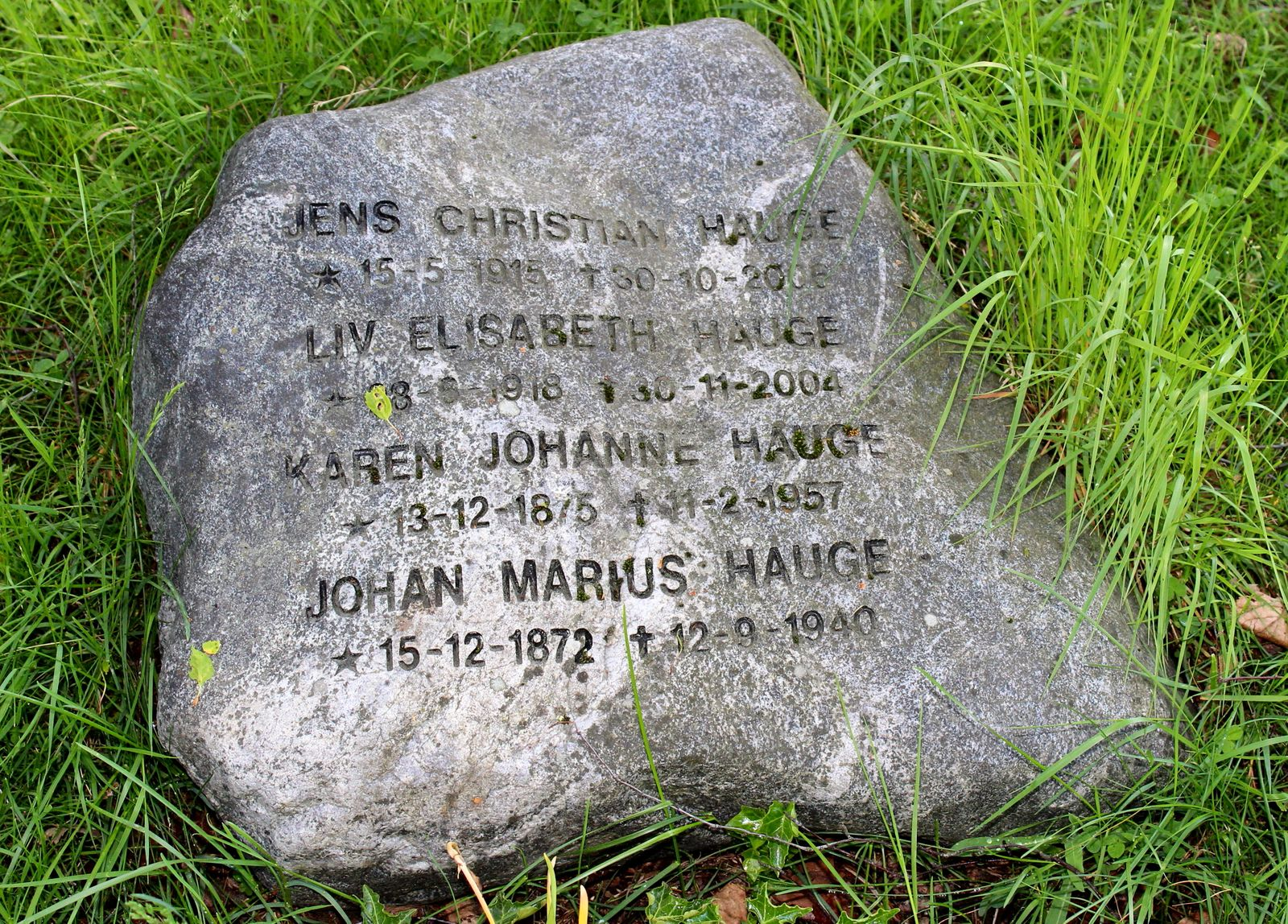
Grannes and Hauge's tombstone in Nordstrand Cemetery

She died in Oslo on 30 November 2004.

Liv Grannes' road on Andås in Vefsn Municipality is named after her.

In 2021, a documentary film about Grannes resistance activities was made, titled "Jeanne D'Arc of the North".

== See also ==
- Norwegian resistance movement
- List of recipients of the George Medal in the 1940s
