= Michael Hansson (judge) =

Norwegian judge (1875–1944)

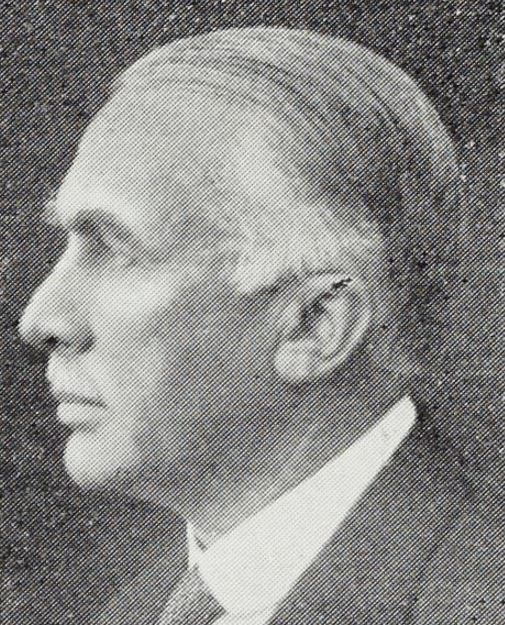
Michael Hansson

Michael Hansson (19 November 1875 – 5 December 1944) was a Norwegian judge.

== Biography ==
Hansson was born in Christiania (now Oslo), Norway. He was a son of jurist and insurance manager Michael Skjelderup Hansson (1839-1922) and Julie Caroline Cathrine Lasson (1842-1922). He was father of the actor, Knut Mørch Hansson (1920–1994). He attended Christiania Cathedral School and took his law degree from the Royal Fredrik's University (now University of Oslo) in 1899. Hansson was also the father of Arthur Mørch Hansson.

Dating from 1906, he spent 25 years as a judge in Egypt, first in Al-Mansurah and later in Alexandria. He was a member of the Permanent Court of Arbitration in The Hague from 1929. From 1936 to 1938 he served as president of the Nansen International Office for Refugees. He was decorated Knight, First Class of the Order of St. Olav in 1915, and Commander, Second Class in 1926. He was Commander of the Order of the Polar Star, and received the grand cross of the Egyptian Order of the Nile and of the Order of Ismail.
