= Ole Arntzen =

Ole Arntzen (4 February 1910 – 7 August 1973) was a Norwegian businessman and resistance member during World War II. He was a brother of Sven Arntzen. He was a member of the Central Committee of Milorg, where he served as General Inspector ("Stor I") from April 1944 to May 1945. His cover name was "Ørnulf". In his World War II memoirs, Gunnar Sønsteby devotes one chapter to the arrest of Milorg leaders Jens Christian Hauge and Arntzen by the State police on 10 April 1945, but their central role was not discovered.
