= Knut Møyen =

Norwegian resistance fighter

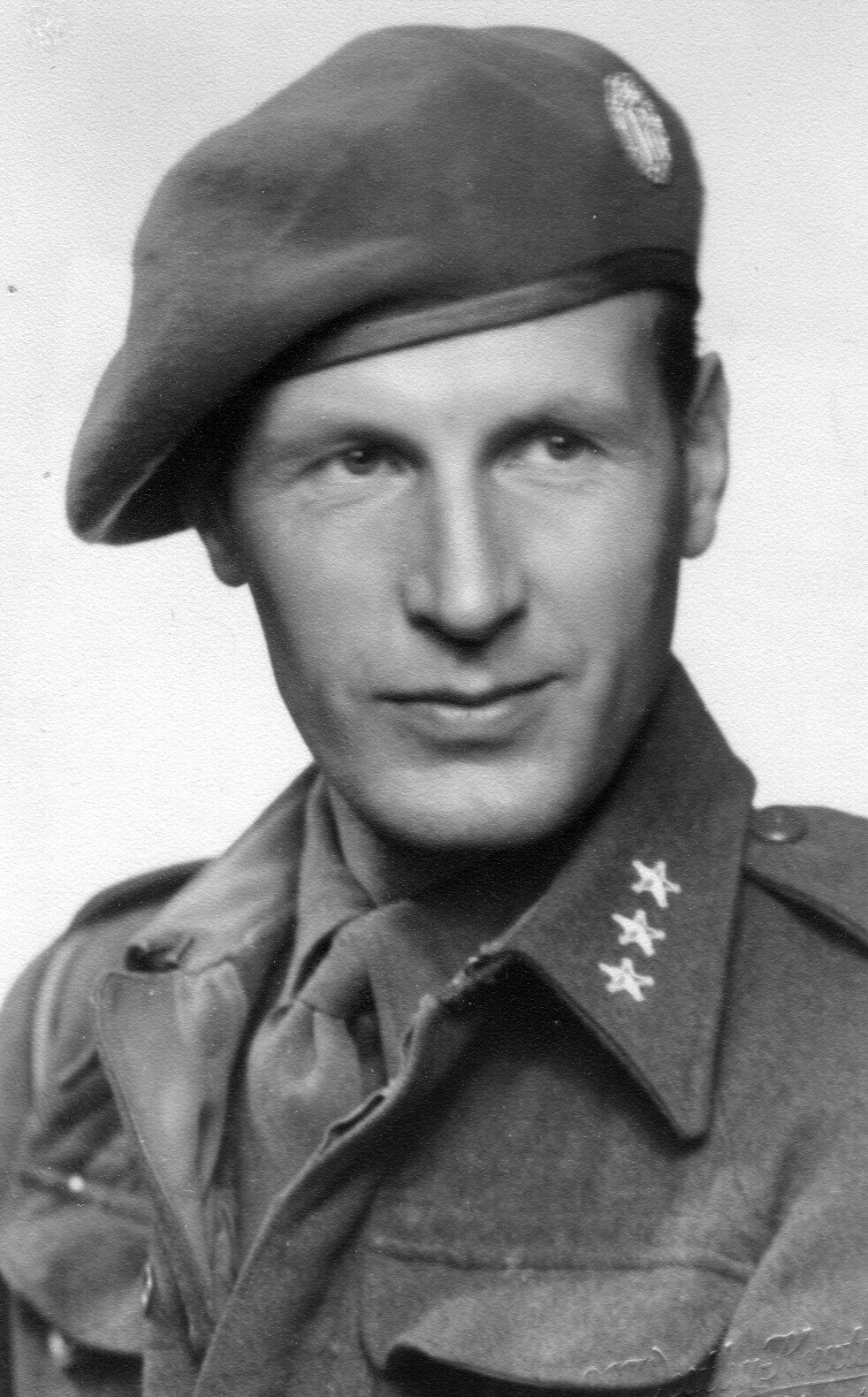
Knut Møyen

Knut Møyen (19 January 1907 – 20 March 1984) was a Norwegian economist and resistance member. He was born in Aker. After the German invasion of Norway in 1940 he participated in the Norwegian Campaign. From 1941 to 1942 he was a central organizer of the underground military organization Milorg. His "shadow" Jens Christian Hauge later eventually became the leader of Milorg. In 1942 he just managed to avoid being caught by the Gestapo, and fled to Sweden and later to the United Kingdom. In London he served at the Norwegian High Command. He was awarded St. Olav's Medal With Oak Branch and the Defence Medal 1940–1945. He died in Oslo in 1984. A memorial designed by Nils Aas was unveiled in Nordmarka in 1989.
