= Jens Christian Hauge =

Norwegian resistance member (1915–2006)

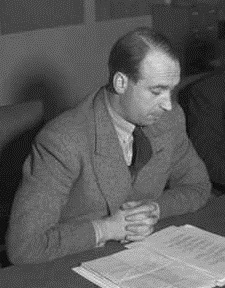
- Hauge in 1947.

Minister of Justice
- In office 22 January 1955 – 1 November 1955
- Prime Minister: Einar Gerhardsen
- Preceded by: Gustav Sjaastad
- Succeeded by: Jens Haugland

Minister of Defence
- In office 5 November 1945 – 5 January 1952
- Prime Minister: Einar Gerhardsen; Oscar Torp
- Preceded by: Oscar Torp
- Succeeded by: Nils Langhelle

Personal details
- Born: 15 May 1915 Ljan, Norway
- Died: 30 October 2006 (aged 91) Vinderen, Norway
- Party: Labour
- Spouse(s): Anna Sophie Dedekam (?–1958); Liv Elisabeth Sjøberg (1958–2004; her death)
- Children: 6

Jens Christian Hauge (15 May 1915 – 30 October 2006) was a Norwegian lawyer and leader in the World War II resistance—and one of the two incumbent Milorg Council members in May 1945. He served as Minister of Defence from 1945-1952 and Minister of Justice from January to November 1955.

After 1955 he never held political office, but "continued to exert influence on political processes—sometimes openly", and sometimes less so.

He is also controversial, and has been criticised for not giving more information regarding central parts of the Milorg activities, such as assassinations of Norwegian collaborators.

== Early life ==
He was born at Ljan, and he had an older sister Aase. Their mother was a school teacher of hand craft, and the father was son of a cotter. Jens Chr. Hauge's father was a former non-commissioned officer, who worked in an insurance company.

=== Military service as a conscript ===
He was a conscript in Stavern in the summer of 1936, and served 48 days [of recruit training ] at the anti-aircraft regimental recruits' school (Luftvernregimentets rekruttskole), In 1938 he received 15 days of recruit training.

He received training as crew on anti-aircraft weapon (luftvernbatterimannskap). In May 1939 he was summoned for the last 14 days of recruit training. He replied to the summons with a medical certificate regarding his varicose veins, adding that he was willing to be checked by military doctors, even though [his schedule] as a magistrate (konstituert sorenskriver) would make it difficult to leave work. He received a medical discharge, according to an annotation dated 10 August 1939, by Hauge.

=== After law school ===
He finished his final exams to become a lawyer, in autumn of 1937. He worked as a private lecturer (manuduktør) for law students, for the next year. In November 1938 he started as a dommerfullmektig in Kragerø, to perform his period as a judicial "conscript". In January 1940 he again was working as a manuduktør in Oslo. While still a law student he became a member of the Norwegian Association for Women's Rights in 1936.

== Arrest, imprisonment and trial during World War II ==
The military invasion of Norway, resulted in students not coming to his private lectures, so he was without income. On 12 April he applied for work at Oslo Politikammer, and started work the next day. In June, his employer had established Priskontoret ("the price office"), and he applied for a transfer, and became the leader of the office. On 13 August he was arrested for making statements (during private lectures—of which he had resumed, besides his employment with the police) that violated (or were offensive to) Nasjonal Samling.

While imprisoned, the "Milk Strike" occurred in Oslo, including the 10 September execution of two: the leader of a trade union and a lawyer in LO. "[M]ore than anything, it was the justice-scorning executions of these two, that [later] led Hauge to Milorg." (Years earlier Hauge had the lawyer prosecute a case in Kragerø; Hauge had barely known him.)

During the last days of September, he was transferred to "the newly established prison for political prisoners", at Bredtveit Farm.

17 October saw the trial of Hauge. (At the end of the trial, Hauge was granted a release until the next day.) The verdict of 100 days in prison, whereof 66 days had already been served, was announced the next day—and he was imprisoned. He was released on 30 October, after completing four-fifths of the sentence—eighty days.

== In the Resistance ==
He joined Milorg at the beginning of 1942. (His wife and two children were relocated to Vestre Slidre Municipality in the middle of March—to a [vacant] cotter home which belonged to Husaker (a mountain farm).)

In the middle of August 1942 he became inspector for (Milorg district) Østlandet—replacing Knut Møyen.

On 3 October 1942 Operation Bittern landed four commandos in Norway. During the meeting where the leader of commandos showed his orders to Hauge, Hauge confiscated the accompanying list of 62 "that SOE wanted to" assassinate. ("In 1941 - 1942 there was a tense relationship between Milorg and" SOE. "An early example of such a conflict, surfaced in the wake of the controversial Operation Bittern in the autumn of 1942", according to Njølstad. SOE expeditions which followed, improved Milorg's relationship to the British: The Chaffinch-, Thrush- and Pheasant Expeditions.)

One evening between 7 and 14 October he met The Council (of Milorg) for the first time. The meeting resulted in a half-pascifistic message to the High Command, which in turn replied with a reprimand: To abstain from shooting in self-defense "is in opposition to human nature". (Hauge's dissent at the meeting was noticed also by a secretary at SL.)

In January 1943 he was promoted to Stor I—the General Inspector of all Milorg combat groups in the nation.

=== After promotion to General Inspector ===
In May 1943, he traveled to Sweden—his first trip abroad for Milorg. (Njølstad says that Hauge's rapidly increasing influence in Milorg—and later in den samlede hjemmefrontsledelsen—was in part because he never feared traveling abroad. Furthermore, "[M]any Resistance leaders were reluctant to such travel, because they feared that, in practice, it would mean the end of their effort in Norway. Or they calculated that their power to influence was greater when they communicated with utefronten—from Norway, rather than meeting its representatives" abroad.) 7–9 May saw one set of meetings, followed by Hauge's return to Milorg's Council, to be followed by another border crossing for meetings in Sweden's capital. The High Command wanted more operative control of Milorg's units, particularly in the districts. This is in part the reason for the establishment of radio links directly between Milorg's district commands and the High Command, without establishing radio links between Milorg districts; due to security concerns, the districts were only to communicate with each other through Sentralledelsen in Oslo.

In September 1943, he became a permanent member of the Sentralledelsen's top decision making group—The Council (Rådet). "From then on, for all practical purposes, he was Milorg's top chief", according to Njølstad.

=== After promotion to Milorg's Council ===
From October 1944, the contact with Frithjof Hammersen (officer in Wehrmacht), was handled by Ingrid Furuseth, Hauge, and Ole Arntzen. Evidence from Hammersen, was the first trustworthy evidence of cancelled plans for moving Hitler's inner circle members—to Festung Norwegen. (In the last months of the war, Hauge had secret talks with Wehrmacht officers that gave information about the German plans for Norway. These talks facilitated the smooth transition to peace when the Germans surrendered in May 1945.)

==== After the 5 December 1944 directive from SOE ====
A 5 December 1944 directive (direktiv) from SOE, stating "that it must be a prioritized task, for Milorg and NORIC to obstruct German forces from leaving" Norway. (It was Hauge's understanding that, there was a wish for severing the lines of transportation on land, so that the Germans were forced out to sea—were the British were feeling increasingly stronger.)

On 16 December, the Germans attacked through the Ardennes Forest on the German-Belgian border.

A 31 December failed aerial bombing attack on Gestapo headquarters in Oslo, had originally been requested by Hauge. (77 died, [around] 1000 became homeless, 23 buildings were hit—whereof 6 were leveled. But Victoria terrasse was nearly undamaged.)

==== After the assassination of the chief of police service Stapo ====
Karl Marthinsen was assassinated on 8 February 1945. (Months earlier, Hauge was authorized by the government in exile, to have Marthinsen killed.)

Hauge and then General Inspector were arrested for traffic violations on 10 April, and released the next day.

After Germany's capitulation, the fugitive chief of Gestapo in Norway was arrested on 31 May. Hauge met him, to have him report in writing about Fehmer's work in Norway—with a 10-day deadline. (Hauge's official motive was to cut off Gestapo leaders' options of telling lies in court, about everything they knew about hjemmefronten, but did not use against them.)

The only award he chose to receive for his wartime service, was the one that was given to all Milorg's men and women: a silver needle.

=== Indications of employment with OSS ===
In August 2008 signs were found of Hauge having been employed by Office of Strategic Services(OSS). His name was found in a directory of personnel files of employees from 1942 to 1945—released by the US National Archives in 2008, according to Klassekampen. (Other Norwegians on the list were Wilhelm Hansteen, Håkon Kyllingmark and Knut Lier Hansen.)

== Secretary for prime minister ==
Paal Berg was asked by C.J. Hambro to form a government. Berg did not become a prime minister.

In 1945 Hauge was asked by Einar Gerhardsen if he would accept a position—after Gerhardsen had formed his cabinet—as a "secretary and judicial advisor at the Office of the Prime Minister". As "Gerhardsen's secretary with responsibility for judicial cases", he became linked to the legal purge of war-time collaborators and the trials against Vidkun Quisling and Knut Hamsun.

After the war, he became a member of the Labour Party.

== Minister of defence ==
On 5 November 1945 he became Defence Minister—the youngest of any [Norwegian] minister until then, 30 years old. (Previously, at the end of October, Andrew Thorne had approved the appointment, in the confidence of foreign minister Lie.)

In the spring of 1946 Forsvarets forskningsinstitutt (FFI) was put into service. (In 1945 he suggested measures for preventing Norwegian military scientists from remaining in British service, and in December the cabinet decided to establish FFI.) In December 1945 Otto Ruge resigned as general. In January 1946 Hauge fired then Chief of the Air Force, and the two agreed that the officer would resign at a later date.

Chief of Defence Halvor Hansson resigned in 1946.

=== A Norwegian brigade to British-occupied Germany ===
On 14 May 1946 parliament decided to establish a brigade of 4000 soldiers to be stationed in West-Germany—in line with the ministry's proposal—Norwegian Brigade Group in Germany. (In 1948 the cabinet decided that the brigade's soldiers were to be issued condoms. 400 000 signatures of protest were collected, and Hauge asked advice from Trygve Bratteli about the possibility of having Labour Party employees do partial checks of the lists, and "Should it be done?". (Municipal elections were scheduled for later in 1948, and Hauge thought that the signatures might harm the election campaign of the Labour Party.) The resulting advice was that the partial checks could be done, but that it was not advisable.

=== Svalbard Crisis ===
The autumn of 1946 saw the start of the Svalbard Crisis 1946–1947, involving the Soviet Union.

=== The Rød Case ===
On 13 March 1947 he showed a document to then minister of justice, regarding Knut Rød—who was preparing for trial in the appellate court. (The document was a five-day-old report (to Evang) about Rød's participation in a group that collected intelligence on communists and sympathizers; and about Rød having accepted Norwegian kroner 500 for locating the election lists for the Norwegian Communist Party—pertaining to the last election of parliament and the municipal governments; and about Rød having recruited his brother, for the work [of the group]. (His brother was then a secretary in Kommunikasjonsdirektoratet—a government agency.)

Olav Njølstad says that "Before the Rød Case continued, the Defence- and Justice Minister knew that the defendant was concerned about the communist threat and could become a useful man in the communist surveillance that they had started constructing - that is, under the condition that he would not be convicted of Collaboration with the Axis Powers during World War II, and fired from the police force."

=== Increased possibility of war sensed ===
In the middle of January 1948 he received a secret memo from Vilhelm Evang that stated that the Western military superpowers sensed an increased possibility for war with the Soviet Union.

In January 1948, Koordinasjonsutvalget ("the coordination board") was established, to coordinate and gather information from the intelligence services—military and civil. Its creation is largely credited to Hauge.

=== After the coup in Czechoslovakia ===
On 25 February 1948, a coup in Czechoslovakia was completed, and it was followed by the "Winter Crisis". The same month the Soviet Union proposed to Finland a combined friendship and military pact.

During the first days of March 1948 messages were received from the Foreign Ministry's stations abroad and embassies of Western nations, that Norway could be the next nation to be invaded by the Soviets.

A front page of Norwegian daily Dagbladet insinuated that Hauge had never been a Norwegian soldier, because he in 1936 had been "discarded by den militære legenemd" ("the military board of doctors"). (He had served as a conscript before the war.)

The "Winter Crisis" resulted in a more encompassing political surveillance in Norway, in particular in the Armed Forces, and also within corporations and the civilian administration. On 13 March 1948 a meeting was held in the prime minister's residence, regarding "what could be done to raise the level of preparedness against sabotage and coups within corporations and Norway's administration". (The attendees were Arnfinn Vik, Haakon Lie, Rolf Gerhardsen, Tor Skjønsberg and Hauge [and the prime minister].)

On 11 May 1948 Winston Churchill came to Norway (with Oslo "on its head") and was a guest at Slottsmiddag. (A proposed visit in 1946 was cancelled, in the wake of the Fulton Speech.) After the guests had been excused from the table, Churchill invited the prime minister over, for a conversation, and the prime minister asked Hauge to join. During the conversation, Churchill said that it was in Norway's interest to obtain a security guarantee from the United States. Furthermore, 'You ought not to follow Sweden. Sweden ought to follow Norway.' Furthermore, "Norway interests the Americans because they think a lot about the defense of the Atlantic and about an Atlantic Treaty." (Hauge had conversations with Churchill the next day (at Det runde bords klubb—"the round table club"), and at the farewell dinner held by Britain's ambassador—on 14 May.)

On 17 June 1948 parliament started its deliberations about the Helset Case. Later in 1948 Olaf Helset resigned. (Njølstad says that the military and political opposition that were wishing to evict Hauge from his post as minister—through the Helset Case—ended up tethering him to the same.)

The Norwegian Base Declaration of 1 February 1949 was created after Soviet signalled that it would not passively watch that the Western Powers established forward bases in Norway.

=== Founding member of NATO ===
On 4 April 1949 the North Atlantic Treaty was signed, and Norway became a (founding) member of NATO. (When early in January the same year, "it became clear" that Sweden would not accept Norwegian conditions for a defence union of Denmark, Sweden and Norway——Hauge "became a forceful pådriver (a person who pushes things ahead) for Norway's joining the Atlantic Treaty. - No one person [alone] can be credited" for the joining. (Bergens Tidende has said that then Labour Party secretary and Hauge "were decisive forces behind Norway's entry into NATO - against strong resistance within the Labour Party".)

Olav Njølstad says that points, about Hauge's contributions, deserving attention are: 1) "Through his British and American connections he contributed in fetching, for the government, a realistic understanding of the conditions under which Norway would be able to receive krigsmateriell ("war material") and other help from the Western powers." Furthermore, "this was a corrective to the wishful thinking" ... "in discussions with the Swedes, and in the discussions within the Labour Party". 2) "Hauge exerted great influence on the prime minister, who step by step reasoned and felt his way, to the standpoint which became Norway's choice." 3) "[H]e was an effective spokesman (for membership in the A Treaty)"—to the rest of the cabinet, as well as the party's parliamentary group, and the party's leading organer (organs)."

=== After becoming a member of NATO ===
During the first days of 1951, Labour Party opplysningssekretærer ("education secretaries") had already become kommunistovervåkere ("overseers of communists").

==== NATO membership discussions wished by Israeli politicians ====
Around 1950 leading Israeli politicians contacted Haakon Lie, wishing to discuss the possibility of Israel becoming a member of NATO. Lie sent them on to minister of defense Hauge, knowing that Hauge would reject the idea.

=== After General Eisenhower's visit ===
General Eisenhower's visit to Oslo in February 1951, according to Hauge, resulted in something that doubtfully otherwise could have occurred: minister Brofoss accepted the doubling of expenses for the Armed Forces.

Plans for Stay-behind were made, and "Rocambole" was the section pertained to sabotage and commando operations. His policy about appointing Resistance leaders, in advance of a future military occupation, included: "the total occupation must produce its own leaders".

At the end of October 1952 Norway's second nuclear reactor (which later was shut down in 1967) was officially opened by dignitaries.

On 12–13 November 1951, then prime minister forced the party leadership to accept his own upcoming resignation, and he named his replacement, who thereafter was approved: Oscar Torp.

On 5 January 1952 he resigned as minister of defense.

=== After resigning from office ===
At Labour Party headquarters he held a position as information secretary. The party gave him extra work, and his income from the party surpassed the income he had as a minister. Njølstad says that after the first days, "an enthusiastic and unusually productive cooperation arose within the triumvirate"—Gerhardsen, Haakon Lie and Hauge.

In 1954 his law office was established.

== Minister of Justice, and candidacy for office in NATO ==
He became Minister of Justice in 1955.

He lied—while addressing parliament—"about the eavesdropping (romavlytting) of the Communist Party's national convention".

He resigned as minister at the end of October the same year—or 1 November.

On 6 February 1956 his candidacy for vice secretary general of NATO, was shot down by then secretary general. (Previously, French NATO diplomats had insisted that the next vice secretary general must speak French perfectly, which ruled out Hauge.)

Launching Hauge as a candidate, according to Njølstad, might have been motivated by a wish to keep Hauge from becoming Foreign Minister.

== Israel's purchase of heavy water for plutonium production ==
Hauge helped facilitate the sale of heavy water—for use in plutonium production—to the Israeli nuclear programme, while he was a board member at Noratom and judicial advisor at Institutt for atomenergi.

=== Letter from a corporation to the Foreign Ministry ===
On 10 May 1958 Odd Dahl (the acting director of Noratom) wrote to the Foreign Ministry that the company had authored "a draft for a contract regarding the construction and building of a 40 megawatt heavy water reactor for the production of plutonium". Njølstad says, "Then came the difficult point, that Dahl in no way tried to underplay: Israel wished to follow an independent national direction, regarding the field of atomic energy, and was therefore not set on accepting the strict stipulations of control (kontrollbestemmelsene) that the US" had on their export of heavy water. Furthermore, "For this reason the Israelis preferred "to buy water from Norway at a higher price than it can be bought from the United States"." Furthermore Dahl said that, the Israeli plans were unrealistic, but "hardly unrealistic enough that they can be circumvented with plans of producing atombombs in the foreseeable future". Furthermore, Dahl said that of course one could not rule out that the Israelis one day would want to go in that direction, but the help that Norway eventually might have given Israel to get started "with legitimate civilian applications today, presumably can hardly be viewed in [a] relation to such remote possibilities".

=== Leading up to the transportation to Israel ===
On 21 August 1958 Hauge suggested to chargé d'affaires Miron that Israel might want to buy heavy water from Great Britain. Miron replied that if Noratom purchased the water back from Great Britain, and sold it to Israel—with Norwegian stipulations of control—then that would seem okay, in principle.

Njølstad says that "State Secretary Engen became more and more convinced that the heavy water was to be used for producing nuclear weapons", and in several memos he advised then foreign minister to not go through with the [proposed] agreement.

On 20 February 1959 the government authorized the deal, by royal decree (kongelig resolusjon). Noratom took possession of [20 tons of] heavy water in the first quarter of 1959—from Britain's Atomic Authority—and it was loaded onto a ship, that departed a British port. (Before being shipped out of Britain, Norwegian authorities saw no need for an export license, since the shipment was outside of Norway's borders.) After sailing out of British jurisdiction, the ship was to be ordered to sail directly for Israel.

=== Inspection in Israel ===
On 8 April 1961 Hauge was taken to the Negev Desert for a private meeting with then prime minister of Israel.

On 14 April 1961 Hauge conducted Norway's first and only inspection of the shipment of heavy water to Israel, as a result of US' impetus. (This was done at Rehovot.)

He [later] told the foreign ministry that he had not been to the Dimona facility—thereby disinforming the ministry.

=== Cancelled purchase of 3 tons of heavy water ===
On 1 September 1971 Hauge—vice chairman at Noratom-Norcontrol—was informed that Noratom-Norcontrol [the same year] had purchased three tons of heavy water—at the request of Norsk Hydro—on behalf of Israel. Hauge demanded that the chairman be informed immediately, and that the chairman inform the foreign ministry that the sale had not been preceded by discussions by the board of directors. He resigned from the board of directors, in part because of how the leaders of Noratom and Norsk Hydro had handled the purchase.

By 30 September, the [1971] purchase of heavy water was cancelled.

=== 1979 uncovering of the original transaction ===
The 1959 transaction was uncovered in 1979, by Sverre Lodgaard. Hauge told media that he had made a report to the government after the inspection, and that he declined further comment to the media.

Nine tons (of the original twenty, later augmented by one ton) were purchased back by the Norwegian government.

== Bilderberg Group ==
Frequent correspondence between Hauge and founder of the Bilderberg Group (released after Hauge's death) showed that Hauge was a central figure on the board of the group. Olav Njølstad says that Hauge described attending the group's conferences as "interesting, cheerful and comfortable".

Hauge attended the 1955, 1956 and the 1957 conference at St. Simons Island, US. According to the official website of the group, he was a member of the steering committee.

== Airline SAS ==
In August 1961 then minister of transportation asked him to participate in a Scandinavian committee to deal with the economic crisis in the airline Scandinavian Airlines System (SAS). (In 1946, as minister of defence, he had participated in "picking [national airline] Det Norske Luftselskap (DNL) up from the ground and placing on its feet, after the war".)

== Establishment of a state-owned oil company ==
Hauge was involved in the establishment of a state-owned oil company, which became Statoil.

== After influencing changes in law, to allow tax exemption "when social considerations" dictate ==
He had contacted officials in the Finance Ministry about the possibility of having changes in law, to allow tax exemption "when social considerations" dictate. (In autumn of 1972, Jens Henrik Nordlie contacted Hauge about converting a corporation (Kioskkompaniet) into a foundation.) In 1973 the financing of Fritt Ord (a foundation) became a reality, and the foundation was established in 1974.

=== Death of a former prime minister, after reconciliation of former comrades ===
The September 1987 death of Einar Gerhardsen, according to Njølstad, "marked the beginning of the end of Hauge's political influence within the Labour Party". (Before that, Gerhardsen wrote a letter of reconciliation to Haakon Lie, dated 15 April 1985; Hauge authored its redemptive wording: "For a long time, I [Gerhardsen] have been aware of, that I back then should not have tatt ordet ("taken the word") and said what I said.". (In 1967 at the national convention, according to Hauge, Gerhardsen "broke the staff over Haakon Lie".)

== Inferred withholding of info about the 1945 death of Kai Holst ==
On 27 September 1994 two publishers called in a press conference, with the authors of two books about Resistance fighter Kai Holst. The invitation said "Who killed Kai Holst?" and "Was Holst a risk factor? What were they afraid of? Why did he have to die? Why is everyone holding their tongues?"

In 2008 Olav Njølstad said that Tore Pryser and Espen Haavardsholm during the launch of the books, the two went "very far in accusing Hauge of sitting on important information about Holst's death".

Hauge has been in question in relation to the strange circumstances regarding the death of the Milorg member Kai Holst in Stockholm just after the war.

== Parliamentary hearings about surveillance of communists and others ==
In January 1997 he refused to testify in an open hearing of the Parliamentary Oversight Committee, regarding the conclusions of the Lund Commission. (Previously Ronald Bye had told the committee that would not testify, if Haakon Lie and Hauge did not.)

== Board of directors ==
Hauge also became a monumental figure in the Norwegian war industry. He became board member of several state-owned companies, especially within nuclear power and defence systems, including member of board of directors of Kongsberg Våpenfabrikk, and chairman of Statoil 1972–75.

In Scandinavian Airlines System he was a board member for more than 20 years.

== Transfer of documents in his possession ==
Norway's Resistance Museum received from him documents that he had about his work in Milorg. Later he agreed with Professor Olav Riste—employed at Institute for Defence Studies—that the institute would receive documents about his work as minister of defense. In 2003 Riksarkivet and he agreed about the establishment of Jens Chr. Hauges Privatarkiv, which resulted in more than 60 or 65 hyllemeter ("meters of shelf") of documents.

"The greatest treasures, were the last that he relinquished. Some were first found", according to Njølstad, when Hauge's two youngest sons and Njølstad, went thru the residence at Bjørnveien [at Slemdal ], autumn of 2005—before it was put up for sale.

== Interviews with his biographer ==
During 2004 and most of 2005 he regularly met with biographer Olav Njølstad and the main consultant of the book project, Olav Riste.

The book's other consultants were Arnfinn Moland, Even Lange and Helge Ø. Pharo.

== Death ==
On 30 October 2006 he died at a retirement home in Vinderen, Oslo.

On 7 November a service was held at Ris Church, på statens bekostning. Attendees included then king of Norway, prime minister, leader of LO, mayor of Oslo and other politicians; Haakon Lie, Gunnar Sønsteby, Knut Haugland.

Some weeks later his ashes were interred.

Media commented his death: The Times said Hauge's willpower and resolve—including to implement unorthodox ideas, with authoritarian means—was doomed to make him [into] a controversial figure in a society "that normally adorns itself with being egalitarian and unanimous".

== Family ==
Hauge was survived by six children.

His father died in 1940. His mother died in 1957. His second wife Liv Grannes died 30 November 2004. His ex-wife Lillann died on 2 March 2005.

He married Anne Sophie "Lillann" Dedekam in 1938.

Frank Rossavik has referred to "Hauge's many women in and outside marriage, and his betrayal to his own family".

== Cover names ==
During World War II he had cover names: Tor Aas was his identity at his cover apartment at Colbjørnsens Street 8.

== Documentary film ==
On 10 April 2012 NRK broadcast a documentary about Hauge —Nasjonens skygge ("the nation's shadow"), part one of two.

== See also ==
- no:Arthur Mørch Hansson
- Leif Tronstad

== Literature ==
=== Books ===
- Njølstad, Olav, Fullt og helt - en biografi om om Jens Chr. Hauge. (2008)

=== Articles ===
- Ulf Andenæs [in Norwegian] (10 April 2012). "A war hero is no saint". Aftenposten (in Norwegian). p. Kultur 11.

Political offices
Preceded by Oscar Torp	Norwegian Minister of Defence; 1945–1952	Succeeded by Nils Langhelle
Preceded by Gustav Adolf Sjaastad	Norwegian Minister of Justice; 1955	Succeeded by Jens Haugland
