= Nuisance raid =

During World War II, both the Allied and Axis powers used nuisance raids to divert the attention of military defenses from raids occurring elsewhere, to attack "targets of opportunity" such as trains, convoys and troop movements and to keep the air-raid sirens sounding, thus preventing civilian factory workers and resting troops from gaining any meaningful sleep.
