= Spro =

Village in Norway

Coordinates: 59°46′N 10°35′E

Spro is a village in Nesodden municipality, Akershus, Norway.

It is a former site of ice block extradition industry, and there are a number of man-made ponds created for this purpose. The village is located in southern Nesodden, between Fjellstrand in the north and Fagerstrand in the south. On the opposite of the Oslofjord is Nærsnes in Røyken.
