= Reidar Skau =

Norwegian judge

- Born: 26 December 1893; Christiania, Norway
- Died: 19 February 1975 (aged 81)
- Occupation: Judge
- Awards: Order of St. Olav (1952)

Reidar Skau (26 December 1893 – 19 February 1975) was a Norwegian judge.

He was born in Christiania, a son of Aksel Olaf Skau and Anna Karoline Dahl. He graduated as Candidatus juris in 1920, and later practiced as a barrister. He was appointed Justice of the Supreme Court of Norway from 1945 to 1963. He was decorated Commander of the Order of St. Olav in 1952. He died in 1975 and was buried at Haslum.
