= Albert Arthur =

Member of the Royal Air Force Volunteer Reserve in World War II

Albert Arthur GM
- Military career
- Branch: Royal Air Force Volunteer Reserve
- Rank: Flying Officer
- Service number: 145518
- Awards: George Medal

Albert Arthur GM was a Flying Officer with the Royal Air Force Volunteer Reserve during World War II. In 1944, he was awarded the George Medal (GM). The citation read:

One day in February, 1944, an aircraft, carrying a 500 lb. bomb and incendiaries, crashed near a Royal Air Force Station, and immediately caught fire. Flying Officer Arthur, a gunnery instructor, was soon on the scene and, despite the great heat and exploding ammunition, he attempted to rescue the crew. Shortly afterwards he was joined by Flight Lieutenant Spencer, the station medical officer. The wreckage was blazing from end to end and several times these officers were compelled to break off their rescue attempts. Flying Officer Arthur entered the burning aircraft no less than four times, with a handkerchief tied round his nose and mouth. At the fourth attempt, he was driven back by the heat and flames, his eyebrows being burnt off and his right trouser leg and pocket burnt. Flight Lieutenant Spencer stayed close at hand and searched in the wreckage for possible survivors. It was not until the bombs were red hot and Flight Lieutenant Spencer, was certain that the crew must be dead from the heat that these officers abandoned their efforts. They then warned the fire party to withdraw and cleared the area of spectators just before the 500 Ib. bomb exploded. Although the attempts of these officers to rescue the crew were in vain, they displayed high courage and a complete disregarded of their, own safety.

Spencer was awarded the GM at the same time.
