= Gillian Tanner =

British firefighter

Gillian Tanner GM
- Tanner in uniform on her wedding day in January 1945
- Born: Gillian Kluane Muirhead Tanner; 13 March 1919
- Died: 24 January 2016 (aged 96); Aberaeron, Wales
- Spouse(s): Frank W Armitage (m. 1945, divorced c. 1953) John Wilton-Clark (m. 1954; death 1995)

Gillian Kluane Muirhead Tanner GM (13 March 1919 – 24 January 2016) was a British firefighter. Tanner was the only female firefighter to be awarded the George Medal during the Second World War.

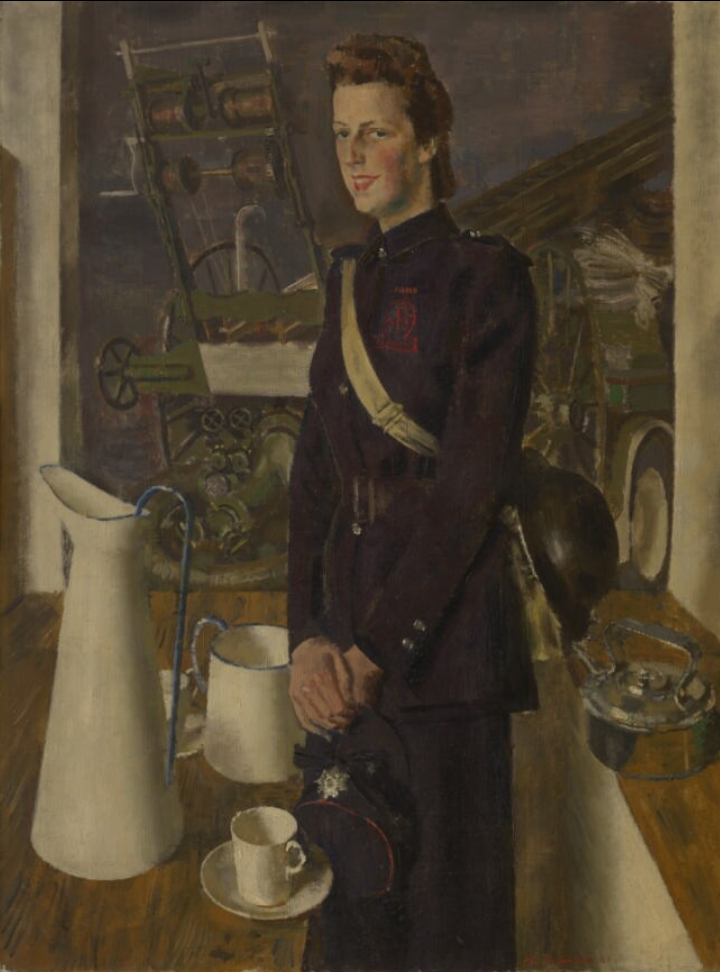
Alfred Thomson's 1941 portrait of Tanner

Tanner was brought up in Gloucestershire but on 3 September 1939 at the outbreak of the Second World War she drove to London determined to play some part in the war effort. As Tanner held a driving licence for heavy goods vehicles (HGV), she joined the Auxiliary Fire Service (AFS) and was assigned to Dockhead fire station in Bermondsey, south-east London. Tanner was given the duties of driving the petrol lorry and the canteen van, as she was the only driver at the station to have an HGV licence. The petrol lorry was not a tanker but carried petrol in 2 imperial gallons (9.1 L) containers from which other vehicles had to be refuelled by hand.

In September 1940 the bombing of London commenced and on 20 September the firefighters were dealing with numerous incidents. Tanner volunteered to go out in the petrol lorry during the blackout and an air raid to get to the docks to refuel the fire appliances. Avoiding bombs and bomb damage Tanner made it to the docks to deliver 150 imperial gallons (681.9 L) for the refuelling of the appliances. For this action Tanner was awarded the George Medal and the announcement of the award was made on 31 January 1941. The citation read:

Six serious fires were in progress and for three hours Auxiliary Tanner drove a 30-cwt.lorry loaded with 150 gallons of petrol in cans from fire to fire replenishing petrol supplies, despite intense bombing at the time. She showed remarkable coolness and courage throughout.

— "Awarded the George Medal". The London Gazette (Supplement). No. 35058. 31 January 1941. p. 610.

Following the award of the George Medal, Tanners portrait was painted by war artist, Alfred Thomson.

Tanner remained with the AFS and its successor, the National Fire Service (NFS), until after the end of the war. Post-war she continued to drive heavy lorries and also participated in rallying, driving in several major races during the 1950s.

In August 2022 two new fireboats joined the London Fire Brigade, one named after Tanner, and the other after fellow Second World War firefighter Harry Errington GC.

Rallying events
Event	Car	Crew
1955 Monte Carlo Rally	Ford Zodiac	Lillian Ashfield, Virginia Farlow-Jones
1955 RAC Rally	Ford Zephyr	Lillian Ashfield
1956 Monte Carlo Rally	Standard Vanguard	Lillian Ashfield, Mary-Handley Page
1958 Alpine Rally	Austin-Healey 100-6	Nancy Mitchell
1958 Liège–Rome–Liège	Sunbeam Rapier	Mary Handley-Page

== Personal life ==
Tanner was married twice. In 1945 she married Frank Armitage, an officer in the Durham Light Infantry. The divorced in the early 1950s and in 1954 she married John Wilton-Clark, remaining married to him until his death in 1995. Tanner died in January 2016.
