= Arthur Mørch Hansson =

Norwegian diplomat

- Born: 23 June 1910; Kristiania, Norway
- Died: 4 January 1969 (aged 58); Montreal, Canada
- Occupations: Diplomat; ambassador and consul general
- Parent: Michael Hansson
- Relatives: Knut Mørch Hansson (brother)
- Awards: King's Commendation for Brave Conduct; Defence Medal 1940–1945 with rosette; Order of St. Olav (1961)

Arthur Mørch Hansson (23 June 1910 – 4 January 1969) was a Norwegian diplomat. Taking part as a soldier in the Norwegian Campaign, and subsequently in organising of resistance against the German occupation of Norway, he then initiated a diplomatic career.

== Personal life ==
Hansson was born in Kristiania on 23 June 1910 to judge Michael Hansson and Minnie Christensen. He married Jette Emilie Gad in 1939. He was a brother of Knut Mørch Hansson.

== Career ==
After qualifying for higher education in 1930, Hansson undertook a mercantile education. In 1940 he volunteered as a soldier in the Winter War in Finland, and after the German invasion in Norway he fought in the Norwegian campaign. He was among the pioneers of the resistance organization Milorg from 1940 to 1942, serving for a short period as secretary-general ("Stor O") in the central operative leadership. He had to flee the country in 1942, reaching England in 1943. From 1944 to 1945 he served as Norwegian attaché in Ottawa and Montreal. He was stationed as legation secretary in Lisbon in 1946, and assumed a position in the Ministry of Foreign Affairs in 1948. He was legation secretary in Warsaw in 1949, and served as vice consul in New York City from 1950, and as consul from 1952. In 1960 he was ambassador to Lagos, and from 1964 was consul general in Montreal.

== Honours and death ==
Hansson's war decorations include the Defence Medal 1940–1945 with rosette, and the British King's Commendation for Brave Conduct. He was decorated Knight, First Class of the Order of St. Olav in 1961. He died in Montreal on 4 January 1969.
