= Brinch =

Brinch is a surname. Notable people with the surname include:

- Christian Brinch (1905–?), Norwegian civil servant
- Gregers Brinch (born 1964), Danish composer
- Jeppe Brinch (born 1995), Danish footballer
- Lorentz Brinch (1910–1953), Norwegian barrister, military officer, banker and politician
- Sigurd Christian Brinch (1874–1956), Norwegian manager and politician
