= Reidar Torp =

Norwegian military officer (1922–2017)

Reidar Torp (7 July 1922 – 19 May 2017) was a Norwegian military officer.

== Biography ==
Torp was born in Sarpsborg. A son of politician Oscar Torp, he fled Norway on the cruiser HMS Devonshire on 7 June 1940, together with the royal family, the cabinet (to which Oscar Torp belonged) and other important personnel. During the Second World War he was a soldier, undergoing training in London from 1942 to 1943 and at the Officer Cadet Training Unit, Sandhurst, from 1943 to 1944.

Torp headed the intelligence staff of the Norwegian High Command from 1970 to 1975 and the Plan and Policy Division International Military Staff of the NATO from 1975 to 1979. He held the rank of Major General. He was the director of the Norwegian National Defence College from 1979 to 1983 and of Norway's Resistance Museum from 1983. In 1995 he was succeeded by Arnfinn Moland. Torp died in 2017.

Cultural offices
| Preceded by Knut Haugland | Director of Norway's Resistance Museum; 1983–1995 | Succeeded by Arnfinn Moland |
