= Reidun Røed =

Norwegian resistance member (1921–2009)

Reidun Røed, née Hjartøy (22 March 1921 – 5 April 2009) was a Norwegian resistance member.

She was born in Rjukan, but the family moved to Jar in her youth, and she finished her secondary education at Stabekk Upper Secondary School. She studied chemistry at the University of Oslo, but this ended when the university was closed by the Nazi occupiers (1940–1945) of Norway following the 1943 University of Oslo fire. She worked as an assistant at the Norwegian Radium Hospital until 1944, when she was hired as a secretary for the leader of Milorg's District 13 based in Norway's capital.

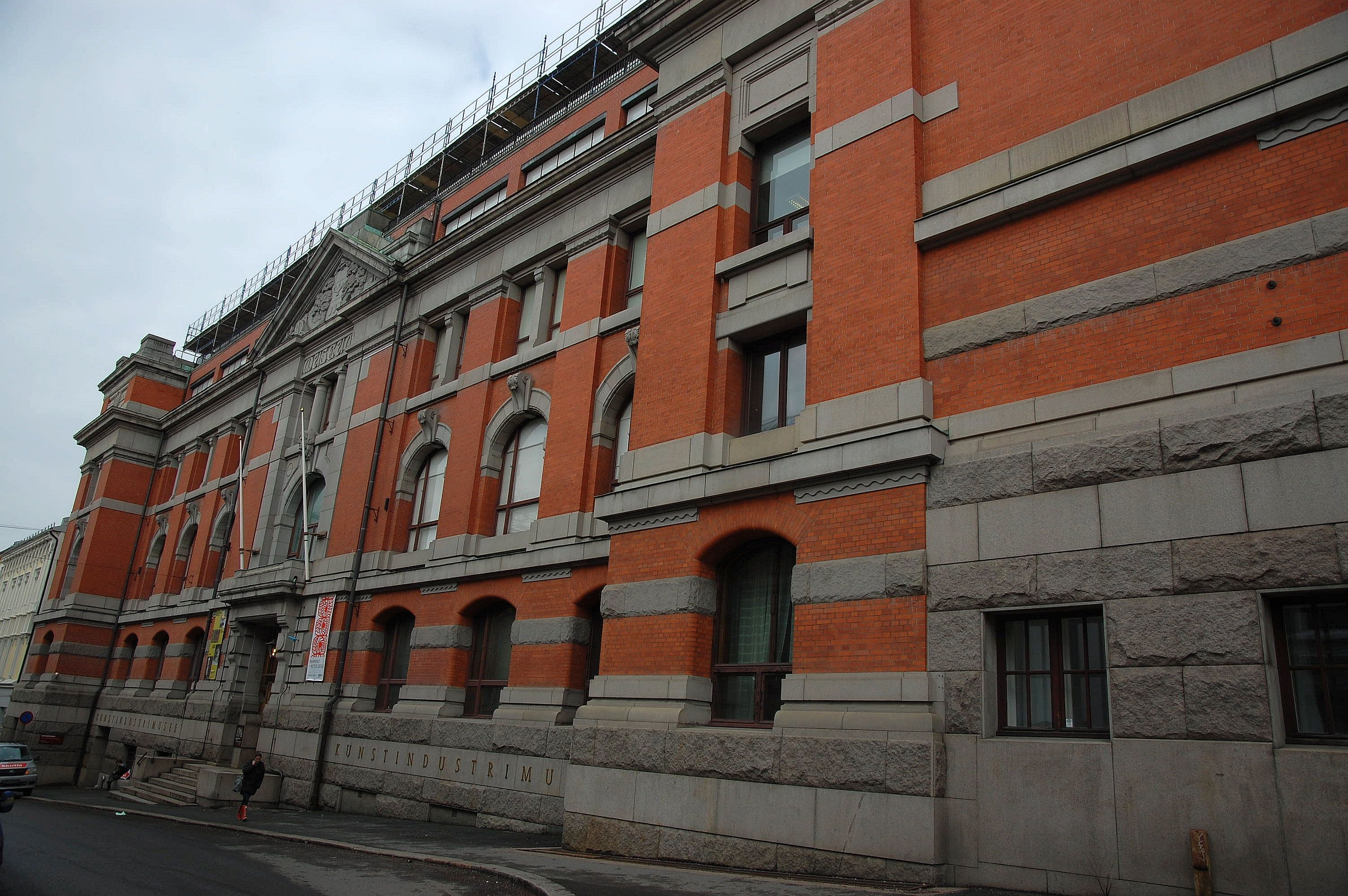
The D13 headquarters were located in the basement of Statens håndverks- og kunstindustriskole until July 1944.

She started working for Major Oliver H. Langeland, the first leader of D13. In July 1944 Langeland received orders from London to leave the country, and travelled to England via Sweden, and Lorentz Brinch took over as the new leader of D13. Hjartøy was one of district leader Brinch's closest helpers. Brinch, Hjartøy and Andreas Tømmerbakke were the three people usually present at the district's main office, where sub-leaders (intelligence, weapons, sabotage, provisions) came in to file reports during the day. As the highest-serving woman in the district she was often called "Milorg D 13's first lady".

She was decorated with the Defence Medal 1940–1945. After the war's end she was given a scholarship to complete her studies in the United States. Here she met Per Røed, a prolific saboteur from Milorg's District 13, whom she married. Røed and Hjartøy were old acquaintances from secondary school. They coincidentally met again at a Christmas celebration in a cover-up apartment in December 1944. They engaged in 1945, and married in the US in 1947. They lived at Jar. She died in April 2009 and was buried at Haslum.
