= Schive =

Schive is both a given name and a surname. Notable people with the name include:

- Jakob Schive (1897–1969), Norwegian military officer, geodesist, and Milorg pioneer
- Jens Schive (1900–1962), Norwegian journalist and diplomat
- Schive Chi (born 1947), Taiwanese politician
