= Armed Forces Museum (Norway) =

Coordinates: 59°54′16″N 10°44′27″E

- Forsvarsmuseet
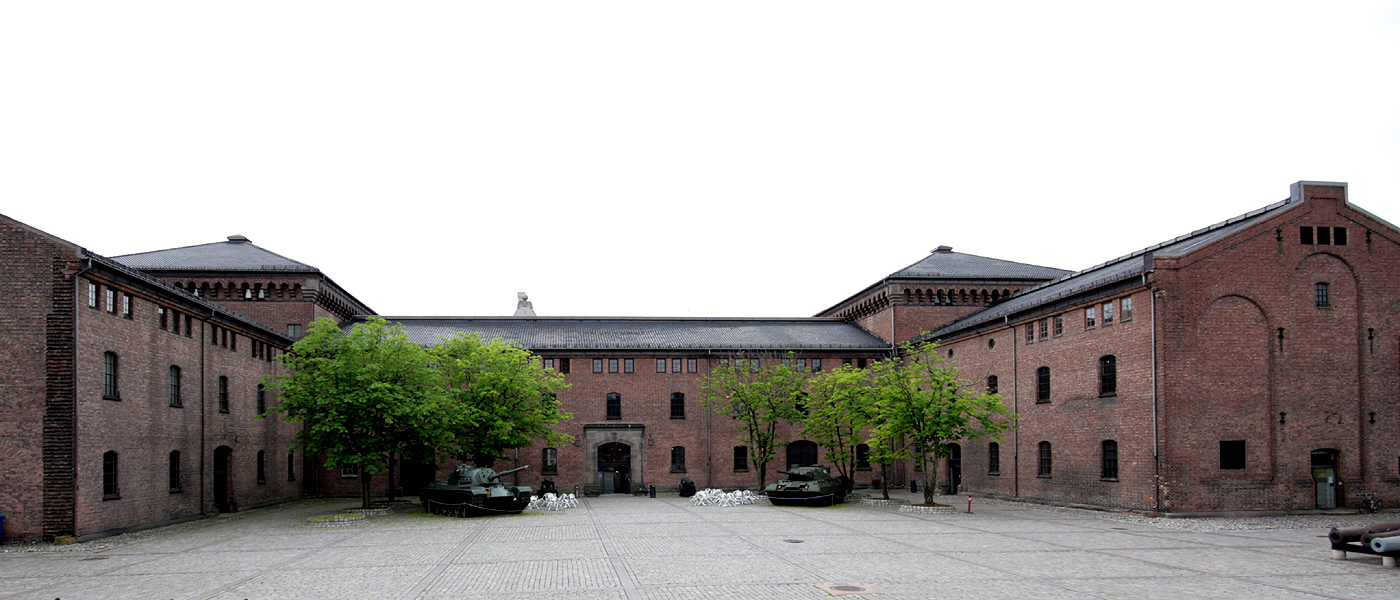
- The Armed Forces Museum
- Established: 1978
- Location: Akershus Fortress, Oslo, Norway
- Type: Military museum
- Website: Website (in Norwegian)

The Armed Forces Museum of Norway (Norwegian: Forsvarsmuseet - The Defence Museum) is a museum located at Akershus Fortress in Oslo, Norway. Previously it was named Hærmuseet, The Army Museum (even earlier the Artillery Museum). The museum consists of mostly army materiel. The Armed Forces Museum is the main museum sorting under the Norwegian Armed Forces Museum superstructure.

== The museum's history and focus ==
The museum was created in 1946 when two former military museums, the Artillery Museum (established in 1860) and the Intendant Museum (created in 1928), were merged under the name Hærmuséet. At first the museum was open only to military personnel, but was opened to the public in 1978 by King Olav V under the name of the Armed Forces Museum. The museum is located inside the Castle Square, in one of the old military arsenals from the 1860s. The main purpose of the museum is to show the Norwegian military history from the Viking Age to the present, and the museum consists of six departments:

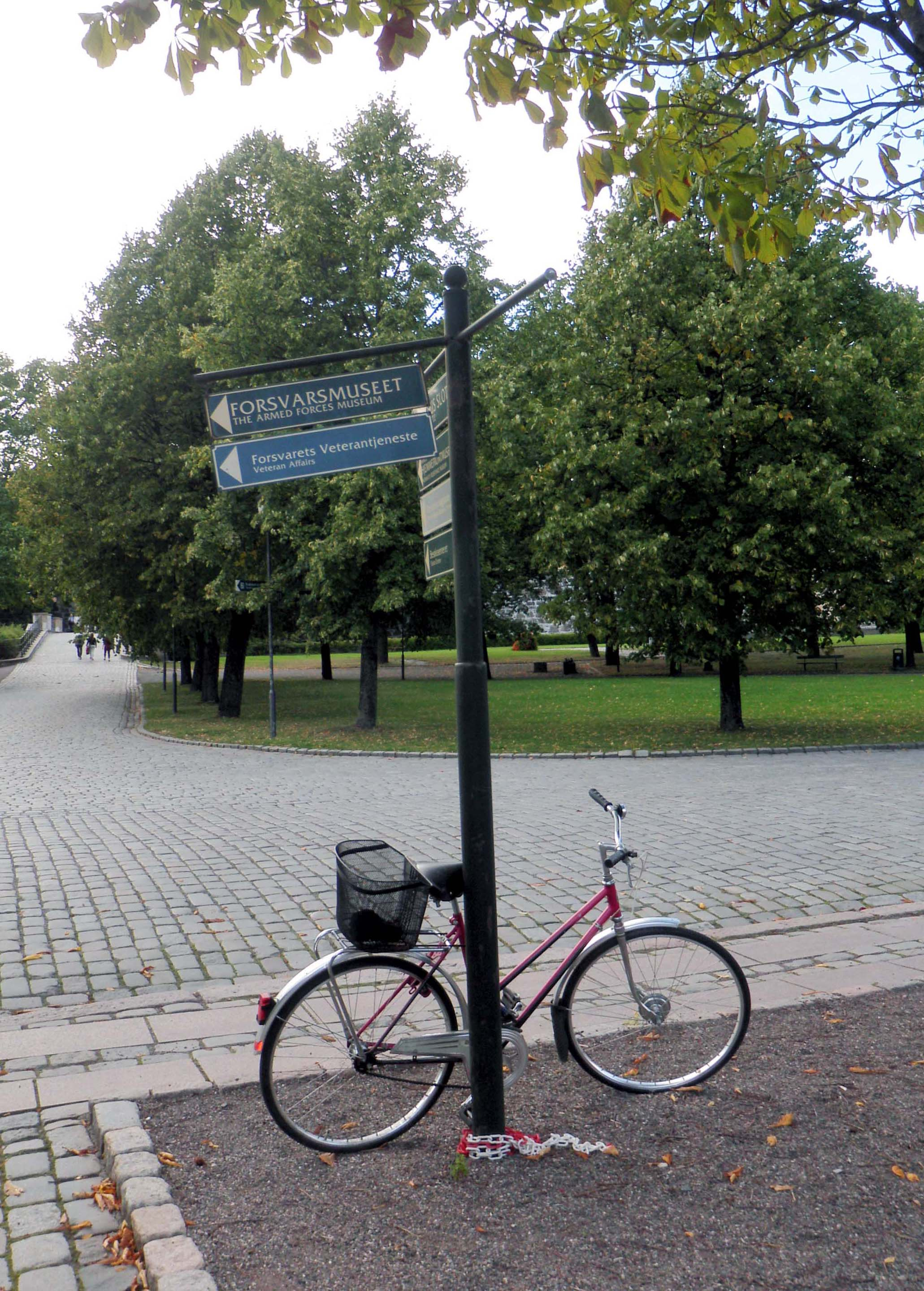
Directional sign pointing to the museum

- The ancient times, military history from the Viking era to 1814.
- 1814 – 1905, military history from 1814 to 1905.
- 1905 – 1940, military history from 1905 to 1940.
- 1940, military history from 1940 to 1945, focusing on the land battles of World War II.
- Naval battles, military history from 1940 to 1945, focusing on naval battles of World War II.
- After the war, military history from 1945 to present.

In addition, there are periods of special exhibitions.

== See also ==
- Norway's Resistance Museum
- Royal Norwegian Navy Museum
- Norwegian Armed Forces Aircraft Collection
