= Battle of Haglebu =

1945 battle of World War II

- Part of the Second World War
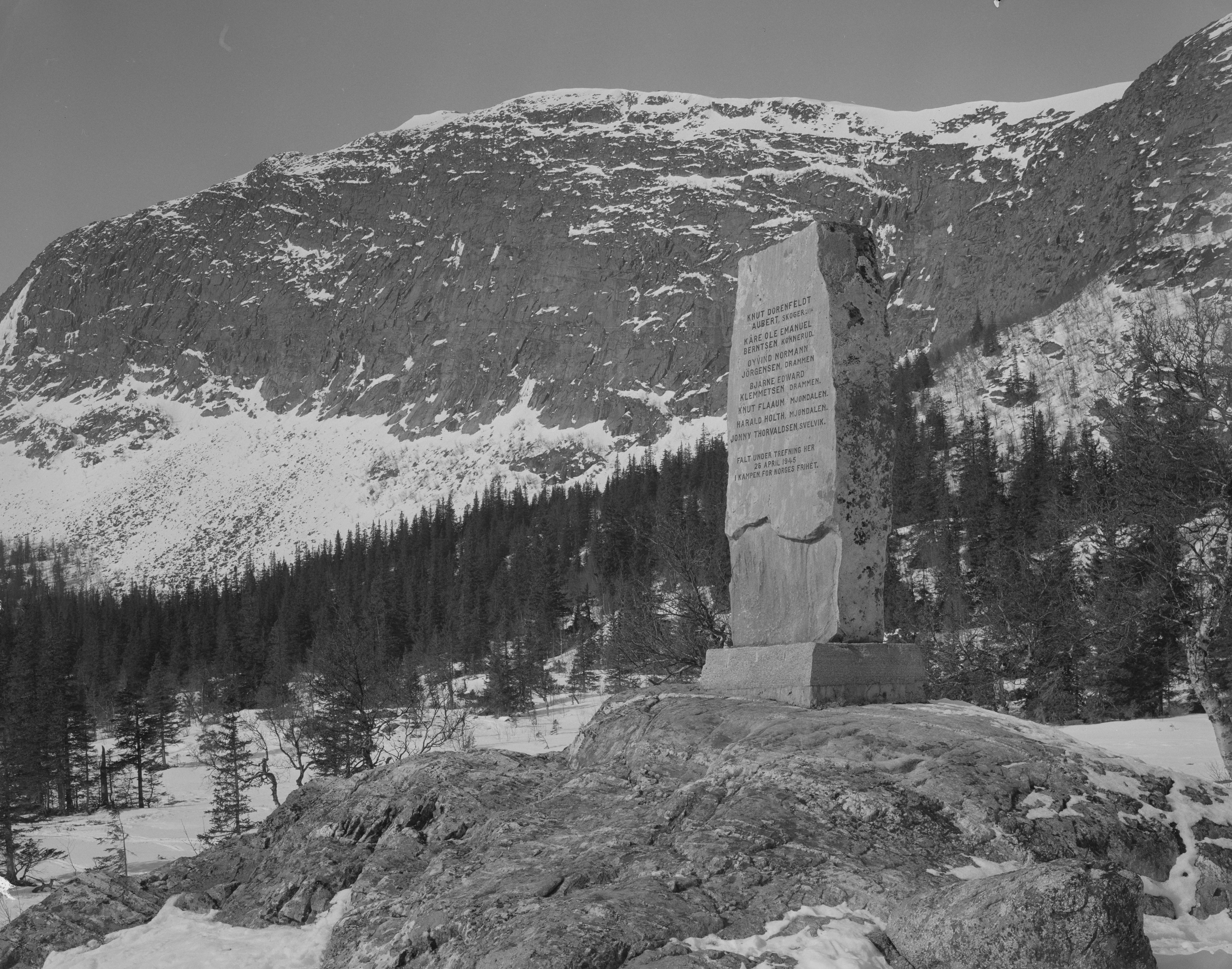
- Monument for the Norwegians who lost their lives in the battle
Date	26 April 1945
Location	Eggedal, Vassfaret
Result	Norwegian victory

Belligerents
Norway (Milorg)	Germany; Quisling Government

Strength
100 men	80–140 men

Casualties and losses
7 dead 2 wounded	25–30 dead

The Battle of Haglebu on 26 April 1945 was a skirmish towards the end of the German occupation of Norway in the Second World War. A patrol of German and Norwegian police troops had been tipped off that weapons were hidden in Haglebu and came up from Eggedal on a search. On the southern shore of Haglebuvannet, the German force divided to search both sides of the lake. On the western side, the Germans received machine-gun fire from the Norwegian resistance movement (Milorg) and soon came under attack on the eastern side as well. After about four hours, during which the Norwegians repulsed the German assaults, Milorg carried out an orderly withdrawal before German reinforcements arrived.

Albeit a small battle and local in nature, it had a large effect on the course of the war in Norway. The battle marked a defeat for Norwegians who collaborated with the Germans. This may have contributed to the collaborators' acceptance of the German surrender, which prevented further fighting between Milorg and the collaborators. The resistance allegedly committed a war crime by executing a prisoner; the Norwegian Waffen SS soldier Tom Henry Zakariassen (21) was shot after surrendering, allegedly by Lieutenant Peter Fredrik Holst, who was never prosecuted for the alleged war crime.
