= Arnfinn Moland =

Norwegian historian (born 1951)

Arnfinn Moland (born 25 August 1951) is a Norwegian historian.

He was born in Kvinesdal Municipality. He finished his secondary education in Flekkefjord in 1970, served in His Majesty the King's Guard from 1973 to 1974, and graduated from the University of Oslo with the cand.philol. degree in 1977. His master's thesis was Prissubsider eller støtte? Striden om melkeparagrafen 1972. From 1977 to 1978 he took a pedagogical education. He was also active in athletics. Representing Kvinesdal IL, he achieved a long jump of 6.91 metres in July 1978 at Lovisenlund in Larvik. He had 14.34 metres in the triple jump, achieved in July 1978 at Stovnerbanen in Oslo.

Moland was hired as a researcher by Norway's Resistance Museum in 1978. From 1993 to 1997 he worked for the Norwegian Institute for Defence Studies. He was the director of Norway's Resistance Museum from 1995, from 1998 with the title of associate professor.

His first major book was Hjemmefront, volume six of the series Norge i krig. The volume was released in 1987 together with Ivar Kraglund. In 1997 he released "Strengt hemmelig". Norsk etterretningsteneste 1945-1970, about Norwegian intelligence, together with Olav Riste. In the same year he released Milorg i Stor-Oslo. Distrikt 13s historie together with Terje Diesen, about the Greater Oslo district of Milorg. In 1999 followed Over grensen? Hjemmefrontens likvidasjoner under den tyske okkupasjonen av Norge 1940-1945 about Norwegian liquidations of Nazi collaborators. This book has been described as a contrast to Egil Ulateig's book Med rett til å drepe.

He also contributed to film. He was a screenwriter and co-director of the film Rapport fra "Nr. 24" about Gunnar Sønsteby. The book Gunnar Sønsteby. 24 kapitler i Kjakans liv followed in 2004. In 2008 Moland published the book Max Manus. Film og virkelighet, which followed the release of the film Max Manus. Exploring the relationship between the film and the real-life Max Manus, the book was written together with the film's screenwriter Thomas Nordseth-Tiller.

Moland has not been entirely uncontroversial as a historian. In 2000 he accused Norwegian newspapers of printing untrue stories about the Norwegian resistance movement, because "relatives of Nasjonal Samling sympathizers" sat as editors in these newspapers. The statement was sharply criticized by editors such as Harald Stanghelle, Steinar Hansson and Gudleiv Forr.

Cultural offices
Preceded by Reidar Torp	Director of Norway's Resistance Museum; 1995–present	Incumbent
