= Andreas Tømmerbakke =

Norwegian resistance member (1910–1994)

Andreas Tømmerbakke (24 July 1910 – 3 November 1994) was a Norwegian actuary and resistance member against the Nazi occupation of Norway.

== Biography ==
He was born in Bergen, and finished his secondary education at Bergen Cathedral School in 1929. He studied at the Royal Frederick University and graduated with the cand.oecon. degree in 1934. In 1935, he took the actuary examination. He worked in the insurance company Norske Forenede Livsforsikringsselskap from 1936 to 1947, Statens Kornforretning from 1947 to 1952 and then in the Norwegian Ministry of Defence.

During the occupation of Norway by Nazi Germany he was a member of Milorg. He was one of the closest helpers of Lorentz Brinch, leader of District 13 based in Norway's capital. Brinch, Tømmerbakke and Reidun Hjartøy were the three people usually present at the district's main office, where sub-leaders (intelligence, weapons, sabotage, provisions) filed reports during the day. After the war he co-edited the book Milorg D13 i kamp. Fra det hemmelige militære motstandsarbeidet i Oslo og omegn 1940–1945 . He died in November 1994.
