= Eva Kløvstad =

Norwegian resistance member (1921–2014)

- Born: Eva Antonie Jørgensen; 10 July 1921; Vang, Hedmark, Norway
- Died: 8 June 2014 (aged 92)
- Known for: Milorg leader during World War II

Eva Antonie Kløvstad, née Jørgensen (10 July 1921 – 8 June 2014) was a Norwegian resistance member and Milorg leader from World War II.

She was born in Vang Municipality in Hedmark, a daughter of Frithjof Georg Jørgensen and Thorbjørg Jenny Godager. During the occupation of Norway by Nazi Germany she took part in resistance work in Hamar. From 1944 she served as assistant for the leader of Milorg district 25 (D-25), who was shot by the Gestapo later in 1944. From December 1944 she was the de facto leader of Milorg D-25, a district which had about 1,200 underground soldiers. She died in 2014.
