= Johan Gørrissen =

Norwegian engineer (1907–1982)

Johan Fredrik Gørrissen (18 March 1907 – 2 April 1982) was a Norwegian chemical engineer and industrial leader.

He was born in Kristiania, a son of ship-owner Willy Gørrissen and Magdalene Lothe. He graduated in chemical engineering from the Norwegian Institute of Technology in 1935. He worked as an engineer for Christiania Spigerverk in the 1930s, and later assumed various leading positions for Elektrokemisk.

During the German occupation of Norway he took part in the leadership of Milorg, (the Norwegian resistance movement), until he was arrested in October 1942, and sent to the Sachsenhausen concentration camp in Germany in 1943. He was decorated with the King's Medal for Courage in the Cause of Freedom for his contributions during World War II.

He died in April 1982 and was buried at Ris.
