= Daniel Eberlin =

German Baroque composer and Kapellmeister

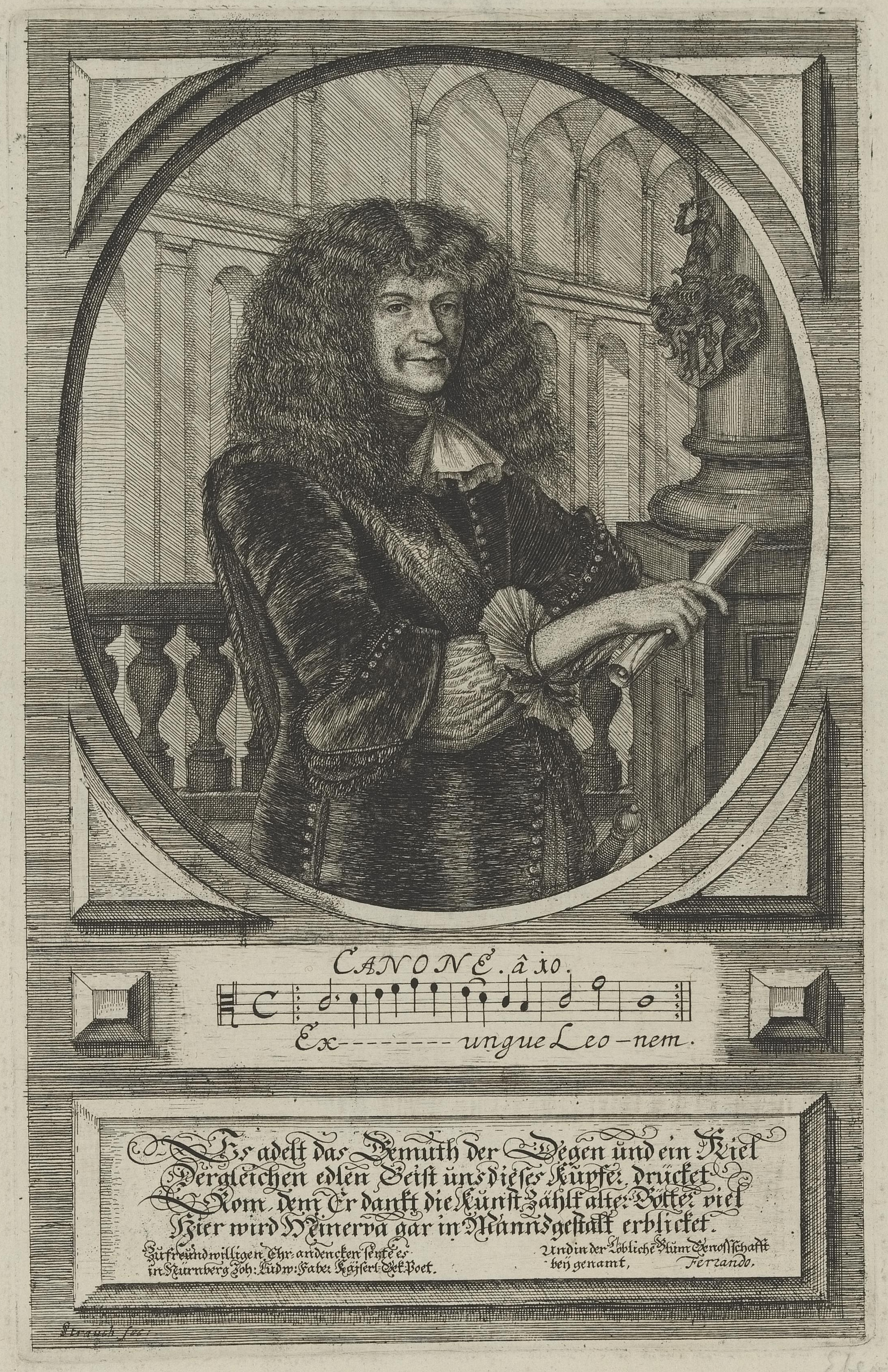
Daniel Eberlin

Daniel Eberlin (4 December 1647 – c. 1715) was a German Baroque composer and Kapellmeister.

Eberlin had a vagrant lifestyle. After a brief military career (he allegedly served as an officer in the papal army), he worked as a librarian in his hometown, Nuremberg. Later he became Kapellmeister at the Eisenach court. From 1713 he lived at Kassel, where he died.

Eberlin wrote cantatas for church services and a set of trio sonatas. However, only few of his works are preserved. One of his pupils was Georg von Bertouch, a German-born composer and officer who dwelt during most of his adult life in Norway. Eberlin was married and had eight children. His daughter Amalia Louise Juliane was the first wife of composer Georg Philipp Telemann. Allegedly, he proposed two thousand different scordature for the violin.
