= Jørgen Christopher von Klenow =

Danish-Norwegian military officer (died 1723)

- Born: Copenhagen, Denmarkj; Denmark–Norway
- Died: 1723
- Military career
- Allegiance: Denmark-Norway
- Service years: ~ 1700–1723
- Rank: Lieutenant Colonel
- Commands: Akershus Fortress; Kastellet Fortress
- Conflicts: Siege of Aksershus

Jørgen Christopher von Klenow was a German-Danish military officer.

Jørgen von Klenow was born in Mecklenburg, (now Germany) and died in 1723 in Copenhagen, Denmark. He was commandant of Akershus fortress, Christiania, Norway from 1712 through 1719. This included the period in which Akershus successfully repelled the advance of King Charles XII of Sweden on Christiania and the siege of Akershus. He took command of Kastellet—the fortifications of Copenhagen, Denmark from 1719 until his death in 1723.
