= Terje Rollem =

Norwegian resistance officer (1915–1993)

Terje Rollem (born Terje Rolld Martinsen; 16 September 1915 – 4 April 1993) was a Norwegian oberst and officer in Milorg during the German occupation of Norway. He is best known for assuming command of Akershus Fortress from the German occupiers at the end of the Second World War.

== Early life ==
Terje Rollem was born in Bærum Municipality to a clerk named Theodor Georg Martinsen and his wife Margit Dagny Berner Høglund. He grew up with his brothers Egil, Svein Thor, Bjørn and Dag. After taking exams at Holte Gymnasium in Denmark, Rollem entered Stabekk Upper Secondary School with a focus on realfag (emphasis on primarily science and mathematics). He finished the examen artium in 1934, and the next year began his military career at the Officer Candidate School for Kavaleriet (cavalry/dragoon branch of the Norwegian Army, lit. "the cavalry") located at Gardermoen army base. He attended two more schools in the years following: Wangs Vocational school in 1939 and Oslo Technical school in 1941.

== Role in the Norwegian resistance ==
Rollem was a second lieutenant conscript in the Norwegian Army when war broke out in Norway. Rollem began driving to the front at Trøndelag on 11 April 1940, two days after the invasion began. However, a German paratrooper landing at Dombås prevented him from reaching the front, so he travelled to Hamar to join up with the 2nd Dragoon Regiment (DR 2). With DR 2 Rollem fought in several battles to prevent the German advance, including in Gudbrandsdalen, and was at Åndalsnes when the Norwegians surrendered in Southern Norway.

After the Norwegians' defence against Germany failed, Rollem returned to finish his degree at Oslo Technical School. In 1941 he was hired at the engineering firm Ingeniør Falkenberg, where he worked until 1944. It was during this period that Rollem became involved with illegal work for the Norwegian resistance organization Milorg, division D 13.233 (Oslo area between Akerselva and Lysakerelva), and in 1944 he began working for the organization full-time. To avoid detection, Rollem moved from his home in Blommenholm to a cabin at Sollihøgda, which became his base of operations when he was chosen as the Milorg head of district D 13, comprising the greater Oslo area. Among other activities, Rollem trained volunteers at Katnosa farm, a resistance base on the banks of Katnosa that was 50 soldiers strong.

On the night of 8 May 1945, the Milorg men were informed via radio of the German capitulation. Rollem was suddenly responsible for mobilizing his troops to retake buildings all over Oslo. Tensions were high as armed German units still roamed the city streets, and in the first days of Oslo's retaking, six people were killed by uneasy soldiers.

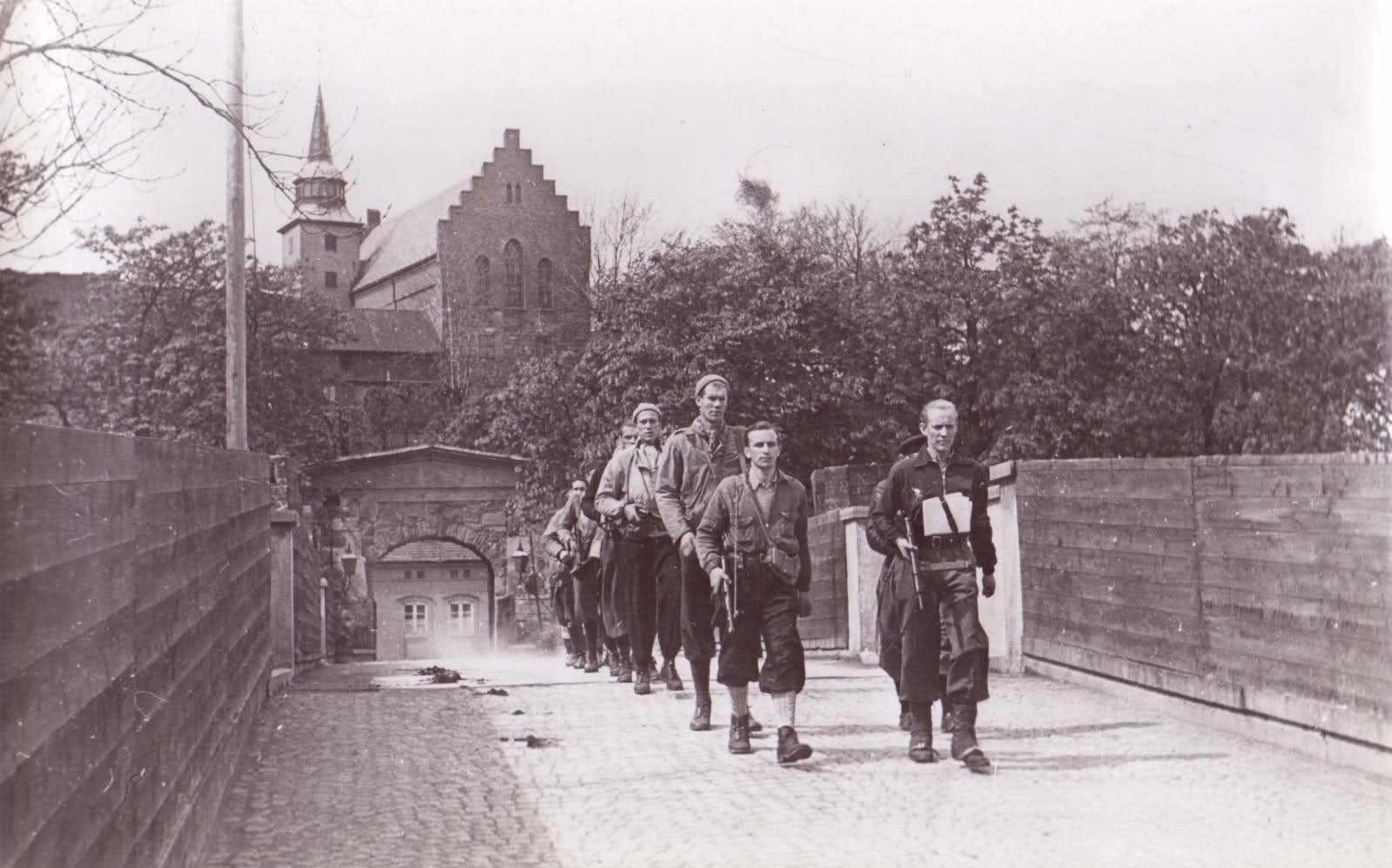
Milorg soldiers march from Akershus Fortress after retaking it for Norway on 11 May 1945.

=== Akershus handover ===
At 10:15 am on 11 May 1945, Rollem was ordered to retake Akershus Fortress for Norway, and he sent a messenger to inform the Germans of their arrival. Rollem, who was stationed nearby at Tollbugata 11, assembled a force of 100 men who carried many Norwegian flags on their march towards the castle at 1:00 pm. Though Rollem had the full cooperation of the commanding officer, Major Josef Nichterlein, the fortress was still a major stronghold for the Germans, and there were doubts whether they would surrender peacefully. Rollem later said of the incident:

When I was instructed to occupy Akershus on 11 May, I immediately sent one of my people there to give notice of our arrival. This was accepted by Major Nichterlein, but we had no guarantee that the 400 armed Germans at the fortress would respect some boys from the woods, with a green armband as our only—albeit, according to the Geneva Convention, fully legal—"alibi."

— Terje Rollem, Aftenposten

The handover occurred at 2:30 pm, on the square in front of the fort kommandant's residence. Rollem had insisted on not having a photographer along, feeling that there was no need for such a photograph and the high-strung German soldiers might mistake the camera snaps for gunfire. However, Rollem's supervisor, platoon leader Viggo Didrichson, sent anyway for photographer Johannes Stage to join them on their march to the castle.

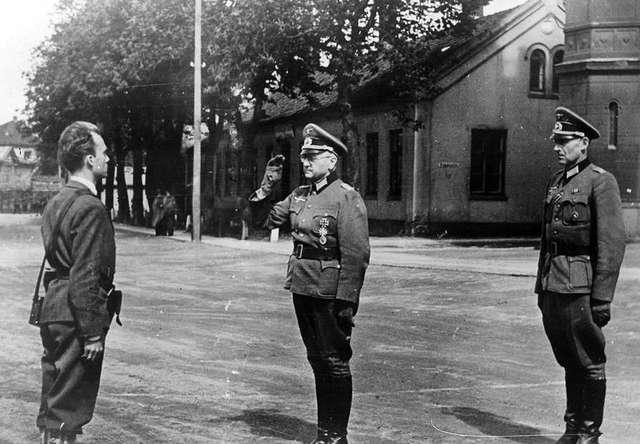
The iconic photograph of Rollem assuming command of Akershus Fortress on behalf of the resistance. From left: Rollem, Nichterlein, Hamel.

The handover was captured in a photograph that was later displayed in homes across Norway as symbol of Norwegian liberation. The photograph was taken by Stage with Didrichson by his side, supervising the handover. Terje Rollem is shown standing at attention as Major Nichterlein gives a grim salute along with his adjutant Captain Hamel. Rollem was dressed in old uniform pants refashioned into knickerbockers, Selburose pattern stockings, and a jacket covered by a Milorg armband, a bandolier, and a belt that held his handgun. This outfit, in stark contrast to the neatly uniformed Germans, was an image that represented for many people the everyman regaining control of his country from German oppression. "Luckily Didrichson was more sensible than me," said Rollem in a January 1981 interview with Vi Menn. "He realized the importance of photographic documentation. That the transfer was a historic moment did not cross my mind. I was just concerned with my assignment. Today I am very glad the photographer was present."

After some words between the two men, with Rollem speaking in broken German, Nichterlein gave one last five-minute speech to the soldiers at the fortress. Along with Captain Hamel, Rollem went around the castle grounds, replacing German guards with his own Milorg men. Two Poles condemned to death were freed, and a Norwegian flag was raised, allegedly the same one that was lowered at the fortress in 1940. Nichterlein and his men were transferred to a prisoner-of-war camp in Skien.

=== Nichterlein's imprisonment ===
Josef Nichterlein had been a renowned pianist before his involvement in the war, playing in venues all across Europe, such as in Paris, Madrid, and Royal Albert Hall in London. While imprisoned in Skien he kept in contact with Albert Schweitzer, a personal friend who he had toured with on piano with Schweitzer playing organ. The Norwegian guards were quite fond of Nichterlein and many asked him to sign the famous liberation photograph. Nichterlein agreed, but said of the photo, "I hope nobody thinks that I brought my hand up for a Hitler salute in the picture—because that man I have loathed all my life." Nichterlein was sent back to Germany in June 1947, but died only a month later and never saw his wife and children again.

== Postwar years ==
Rollem continued his military career after the war ended, spending a year at the Norwegian Military Academy in 1946 and the next year becoming a rittmester in Kavaleriet and an office manager for Forsvarsstaben at Akershus Fortress, where he gathered intelligence for the military. At the same time, he also worked as a manager at the Granli logging company in Kongsvinger until 1949. In 1951 he began studies at the Royal Swedish Army Staff College in Stockholm. He was promoted to lieutenant colonel in 1956 and served as a chief of staff for Kavaleriet's ordnance personnel. In 1960 he once again attended military school, this time at the Military University College (Norwegian: Forsvarets høgskole), and in 1962 he was promoted to oberst and commander for NATO's Allied Forces Northern Europe in Kolsås. From 1971 until his retirement in 1980 Rollem was head of the Directorate of Public Roads' military branch.

Terje Rollem was married to Ellen Marie (“Nusse”) Hansen (18.10.1919–5.11.1995) on 9 June 1944, the same year he adopted Rollem as his surname and dropped his middle name. They were divorced in 1978, after which Rollem lived with his partner Liv Sjetne. After his retirement in 1980, Rollem lived in Lillehammer and maintained his keen interest in the military. He died on 4 April 1993, outlived by his partner Sjetne, and was buried in Lillehammer. In 1995, on the 50th anniversary of Norway's liberation, a postage stamp was issued in Rollem's honor. Rollem was a recipient of the Defence Medal 1940–1945 with a rosette to indicate his further role in the Norwegian resistance after the initial fight against Germany.
