= Ørnulf Rød =

Norwegian lawyer

Ørnulf Rød (23 October 1891 – 1969) was a Norwegian barrister.

He was born in Tønsberg as a son of ship-owner Bernhard Adolf Johannessen Rød (1833–1892) and Manny Gullichsen (1852–1933). He finished his secondary education in 1909, finished officer's training in 1912 and graduated with the cand.jur. degree from the Royal Frederick University in 1919. He was a deputy judge for one year before starting as a junior solicitor in Kristiania in 1920. From 1925 he was a barrister with access to working with Supreme Court cases. He started his own law firm in Oslo in 1933.

In the military he was a Premier Lieutenant from 1912 and Captain from 1915 to 1934, then returned as Major in 1936 and Lieutenant Colonel from 1944. From 1945 to 1946 he served as the Judge Advocate General for the Norwegian Armed Forces.

He was a board member and chairman of several shipping companies. He died in 1969 and was buried in Tønsberg.

Military offices
Preceded by vacant (WWII)	Judge Advocate General for the Norwegian Armed Forces; 1945–1946	Succeeded by Lorentz Brinch
