= Georg von Bertouch =

German-born baroque composer and military officer

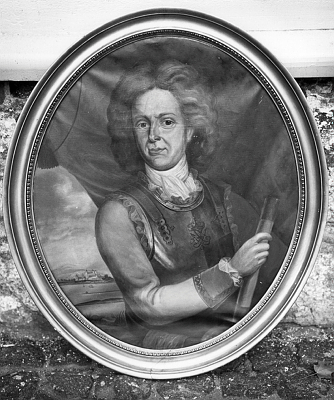
Georg von Bertouch

Georg von Bertouch (also Bertuch; 19 June 1668 – 14 September 1743) was a German-born Baroque composer and military officer who dwelt during most of his adult life in Norway.

== Biography ==
Bertouch was born at Helmershausen in Franconia as Georg Bertuch. At age fifteen he began studying violin and composition in Eisenach. According to a letter he sent to Johann Mattheson, his first teacher was Daniel Eberlin (1647–1715).

From 1691 to 1693 Bertouch lived in Kiel. In 1693 he took his doctorate in law with a dissertation entitled De eo quod justum est circa ludos scenicos operasque modernas. He entered military service in July 1693 and was to remain an officer of the Dano-Norwegian army for the rest of his life. He fought twenty-two battles and survived severe injuries. In 1719 he was appointed commander of Akershus Fortress in Christiania (now Oslo), where he continued to live until his death.

Bertouch corresponded with several composers in Germany and elsewhere, e.g., Johann Sebastian Bach and Antonio Lotti. Mattheson dedicated his Das beschützte Orchestre to Bertouch and twelve other celebrities, including George Frideric Handel.

Bertouch is remembered today for his collection of twenty-four sonatas in each of the twenty-four keys, of which only eighteen survive in a fragmentary manuscript. Apart from these sonatas, three sacred cantatas dating from the early 1690s have been preserved.

== Recordings ==
- Georg von Bertouch, Trio Sonatas with pieces from the music book of Jacob Mestmacher, Bergen Barokk, Toccata Classics TOCC 0006 (2005).
