= Christian Brinch =

Norwegian civil servant (1905–1979)

- Born: 15 August 1905; Kristiania, Norway
- Occupation: Civil servant
- Relatives: Lorentz Brinch (brother)
- Awards: Order of St. Olav; Order of the Polar Star; Order of the Dannebrog

Christian Nicolay Keyser Brinch (15 August 1905 – 27 March 1979) was a Norwegian civil servant.

== Biography ==
Brinch was born in Kristiania to barrister Christian Nicolay Brinch and Anna Catharina Rolfsen, and was a brother of barrister and military officer Lorentz Brinch. He graduated as cand.jur. in 1928, was assigned with the Ministry of Finance from 1930, and with the Ministry of Trade from 1947. He served as Norway's alternate governor of the International Monetary Fund, and later of the World Bank.

He was decorated Commander of the Order of St. Olav in 1967, Commander of the Order of the Polar Star, and Commander of the Order of the Dannebrog.
