= Gregers Brinch =

Danish composer

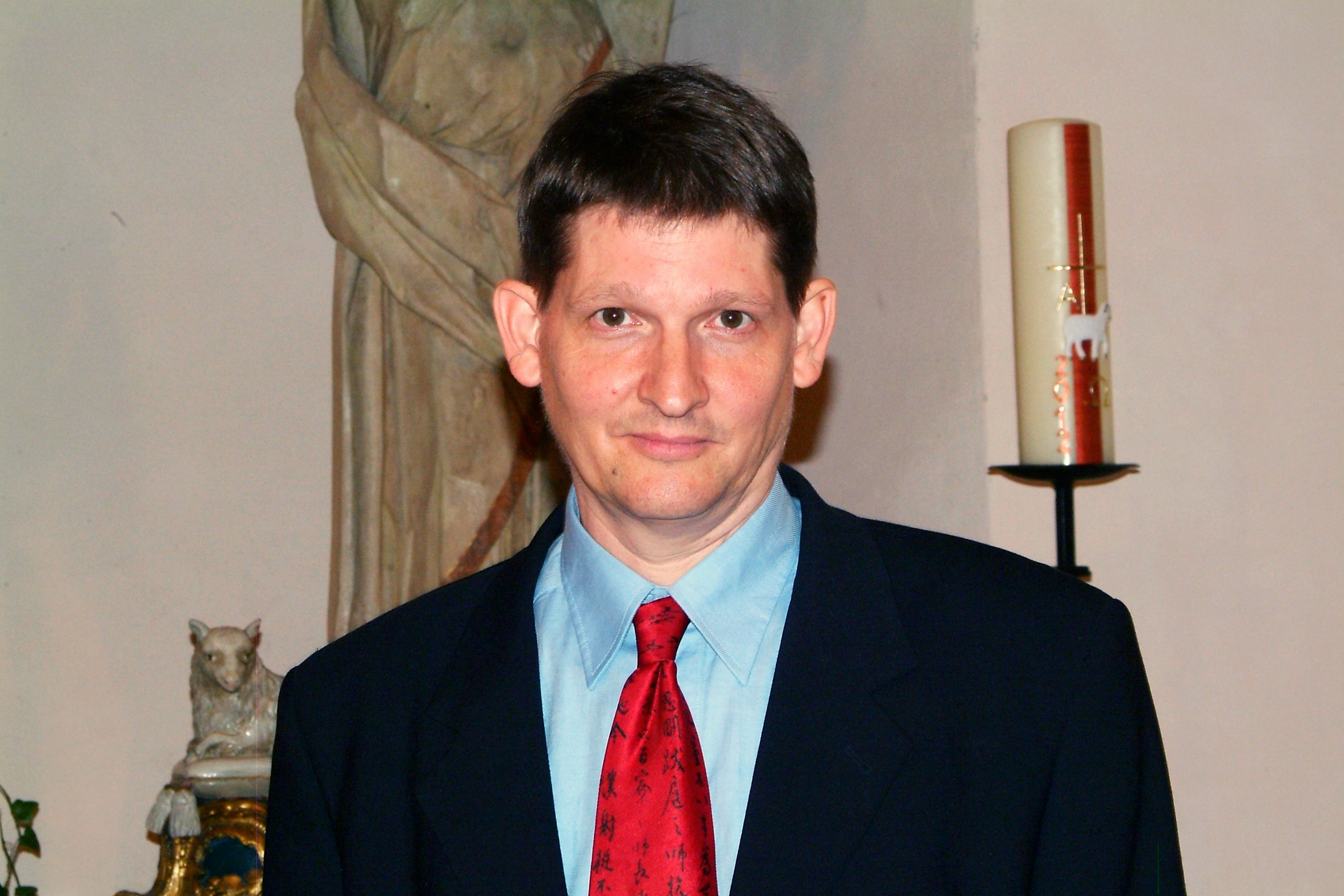
- Gregers Brinch in 2012

Background information
- Born: 2 June 1964 (age 62)
- Origin: Esbjerg, Denmark
- Occupation: Composer

Gregers Brinch (born 2 June 1964) is a Danish composer.

== Biography ==
Gregers Brinch was born in Esbjerg, Denmark.

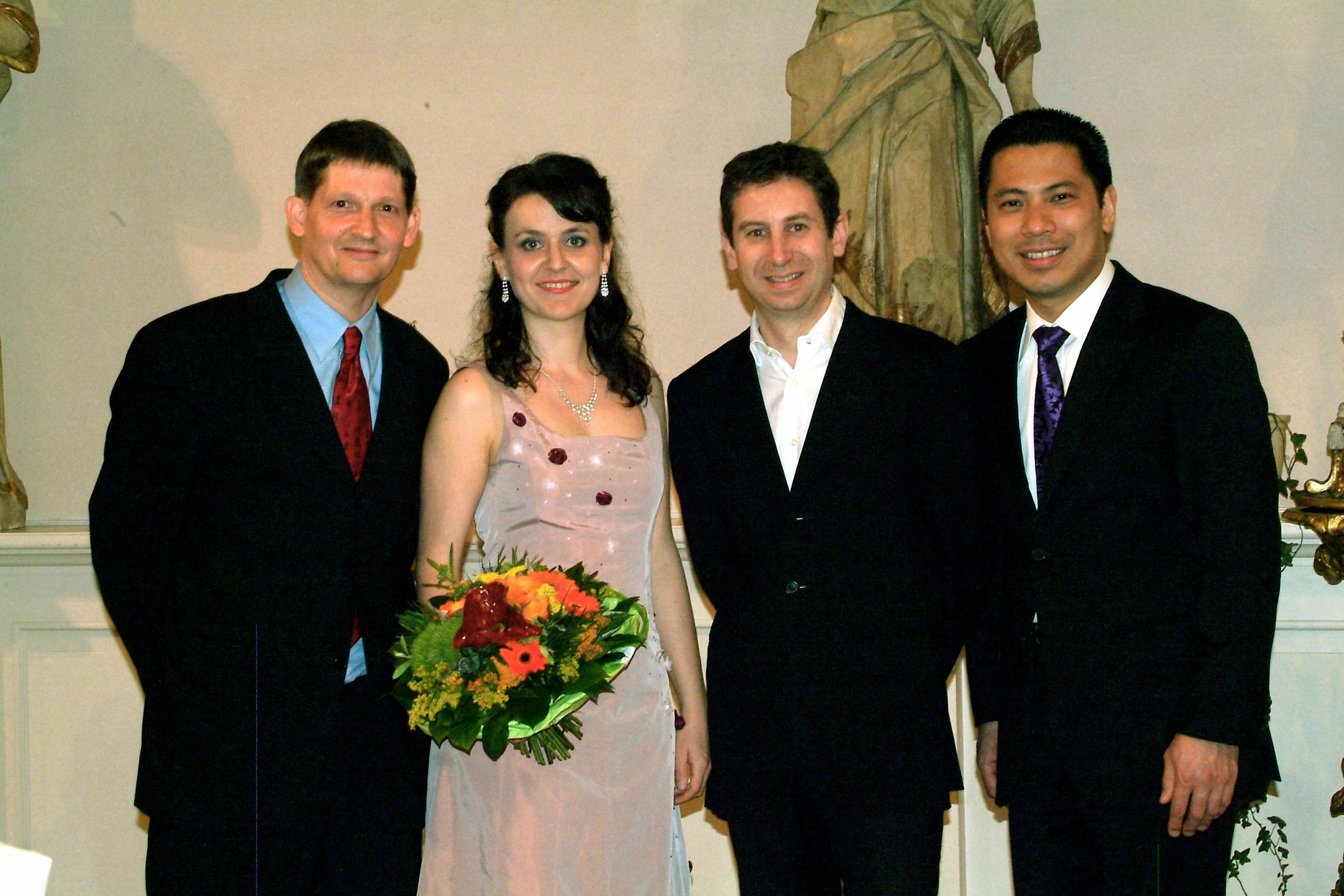
Gregers Brinch, Jardena Flückiger Stéphan Aubé and Jonathan de la Paz Zaens at the festival Hannover im Wort

He was drawn to become a composer upon watching the film Amadeus by Miloš Forman and Peter Shaffer in 1984, at the age of 20. After an initial period of aided self-study in England with the singer and composer Cecil Cope, he studied piano with Louis Demetrius Alvanis in London before moving to Hamburg, Germany to study composition with Elmar Lampson and piano with Alan Newcome and later Ulrike Bauer.

Brinch's use of a number of styles with an authentic quality stems from his wide musical background. He feels equally at home with the blues, as with the music of Beethoven or Gregorian Chants.

His consistent use and exploration of tonality is supported by his finding nuances in harmony and melody which is accessible to the listener without being easy listening. Nature and drama also feature as inspirations for Brinch's work, but it is his study of intervals that has served to lend him his own unique voice as a composer.

Central themes permeating a number of his works include Human Rights and the Holocaust.

His work Lieder aus Leid was 18 years in preparation before receiving its premiere in Hannover in May 2012 by Jardena Flueckiger, Jonathan dela Paz Zaens and Stéphan Aubé.

Brinch's works have been performed frequently in the US and the UK (including Wigmore Hall), as well as in Denmark, Germany and France.

== Works ==
=== For Piano solo ===
- 1985 - 86 : 7 pieces in various styles (Opus 2–8)
- 1987 - 88 : Sonata in 3 movements (Opus 10)
- 1989 : Kalevala suite - Several miniatures to finish themes, commissioned work (Opus 19 )
- 1990 : Elegy - Short piece intended for eurythmy (Opus 22)
- 1994 : The Maiden Without Hands Suite - Music for fairytale, commissioned work (opus 27 )
- 1995 : The Little Seed music for a short story, commissioned work (Opus 28)
- 1996 : 10 pieces to an evening of poetry and prose of Joseph Brodsky, commissioned work (Opus 32)
- 1998 - 2004 : Olaf's Dream 1-3 for solo piano
- 2001 : Sonata in 4 movements (Opus 58)
- 2004 : Dialogue for one for solo piano (Opus 72)
- 2004 : Two Minds 1-4 for solo piano (Opus 73)
- 2011 : Peace Prelude for Sigune (Opus 103)
- 2011 : Dies Irae Piece for the Right hand (Opus 104)
- 2011 : Veni, veni Emmanuel & Magnus Hymne for 3-hand piano (Opus 106)

=== For voices a capella ===
- 1989 : Die Frucht, Rilke (Opus 16 )
- 1989: Präludium (Morgenstern) (Opus 17)
- 1989 : The Rose (Blake) for mezzosopranoes (Opus 18)
- 1990 : Ja, Ich sage es Dir from the gospel of St. John. For Tenor, alto and Soprano, commissioned work (Opus 21)
- 1995 : St. Michael, heavenly hero (Opus 29)
- 1995 : A Winter’s scene (Opus 30)
- 1996 : In the Fullness of time (Opus 33)
- 1996 : Ye Spotted Snakes (Opus35)
- 1996 : To St. John (Opus 36)
- 1996 : God Høst and Tro (Halfdan Rasmussens), commissioned work (Opus 37, no 1&2 )
- 1996 : Michael, who holds the sword (Opus 38)
- 1996 : Various pieces for the dramatic adaptation of Dickens’ Hard Times, commissioned work - Also pieces for The Elephans Child and Rikkitikkitavi (Opus 39)
- 1996 : Songs for the Sheepshearers Mystery Play, commissioned work (Opus 40 )
- 1997 : Riverrun (S.B.Waters) (Opus42)
- 1997 : This Bread I Break (D.Thomas) (Opus 43)
- 1997 : Songs to the Cat and the Moon and the Dreaming of the Bones by Yeats (Opus 44)
- 1998 : Ave Maria (for Chartres Cathedral) (Opus 48)
- 1998 : Introduction (W.Blake) (Opus 49)
- 2001 : The Lords’ Prayer in English, Danish, German and Latin (Opus 57 no.1, no.2, & no..3 )
- 2004 : Salme 130 in Danish (Opus 75)
- 2001 - 2005 : Requiem Brevis in 7 movements (Opus 79)
- 2007 : Adoramus Te (Opus 90)
- 2008 : Tro (new version) text by H. Rasmussen (Opus 93)
- 2009 : Saluni vocal exercise for 3-part male choir (Opus 98)
- 2009 : Hoffnung text by G. Brinch (Opus 99)
- 2009 : Mondnacht text by Eichendorff (Opus 100)
- 2011 : Liturgischer Gesang Schicksal text K.O. Eschrich (Opus 107)

=== For Strings ===
- 1988 : Variations for string Quartet (Opus 10)
- 1988 : Movement for string quartet (Opus 12)
- 1989 : Piece for string trio (Opus 15)
- 1989 : 2 miniatures and 1 Episode for string trio (Opus 20)
- 1999 - 2001 : Sonata for cello solo in 4 movements (Opus 26)
- 2000 - 2003 : 12 pieces for 2 violins (Opus 60)
- 2001 : String Quartet no.1 in 4 movements (Opus 56) - On the CD Harmonious Dissonance by Navona Records
- 2009 : String Quartet no.2 in 4 movements (Opus 97) - Composed for and recorded by the Bergersen quartet

=== Instrumental Chamber pieces incl. Piano ===
- 1990 - 2006 : Sonata no.1 for cello and piano, commissioned work (Opus 24)
- 1996 - 2001 : Sonata no.1 for violin and piano (Opus 34)
- 2002 : Sonata no.2 for violin and piano dedicated to Jonathan Truscott (Opus 64 )
- 2002 : Passacaglia for Violin and Piano (Opus 65)
- 2004 : Episode for Violin and Piano (Opus 76)
- 2004 : Elegy for Violin and Piano (Opus 77)
- 2004 : Pianosextet in 3 movements (Opus 78)
- 2007 : Sonata for Cello and Piano in Four Movements - Dedicated to Rohan de Saram and William Hancox (Opus 88)
- 2007 : 7 Pieces for Cello and Piano - Adapted from the Prodigal Son set (Opus 89)
- 2010 : Celebration Trio for Clarinet, Violin and Piano, in 3 movements composed in celebration of the 150th birthday of Rudolf Steiner (Opus 102)
- 2011 : Von Himmel Hoch for Violin and 3-hand piano, commissioned work (Opus 105)
- 2011 : Fantasia-pastorale for Violin and Right-hand piano, commissioned work (Opus 107)
- 2012 : Triptych for Contemplation three pieces for Flute and Piano: Tantamount, Mount Attan & Numantatot dedicated to Julie Groves (Opus 108)

=== Lieder with accompaniment ===
- 1985 : I hear your Song (A.Locher) for voice and piano (Opus 9 )
- 1992 : The Lamb (W. Blake) for high voice and Organ/piano/harp (Opus 25)
- 1998 : Trilogy (P. Matthews) for French Horn, piano, violin, and high voice, commissioned work (Opus 46 )
- 1998 : Love’s Ground (P. Matthews) for tenor, alto and piano, commissioned work (Opus 47)
- 2003 : The Spouse to the younglings (William Baldwin 16th century) for Voice and Piano (Opus 66)
- 2003 : A clear Midnight (Walt Whitman) for voice and piano, commissioned work (Opus 67)
- 2003 : A Coat by W.B.Yates for voice and piano (Opus 68)
- 2005 : Chemin De Fer (by Elisabeth Bishop) For Soprano, Baritone and Piano (Opus 80)
- 2005 : Frog Autumn (by Sylvia Plath) song for Soprano and Piano (Opus 81)
- 2005 : You Tides with ceaseless swell (By Walt Whitman) for Soprano, baritone and Piano (Opus 82)
- 1994-2012 : Lieder aus Leid 13 songs for Soprano, Baritone and piano composed to German texts written by victims of the 2nd world war Holocaust collected by Michael Moll (Opus 83)
- 2006 : Songs from the Prodigal Son 7 songs for voice and piano (Opus 84)
- 2006 : Apple rhyme for Sigune (by Madeleine Nightingale) song for voice and piano (Opus 85)
- 2006 : Cresswell Oaks (by Roy Sadler) song for voice and piano (Opus 86)
- 2006 : Esther's Elderflower Juice (text by Noa Lachman and Gregers Brinch) Song for Soprano and Piano - Commissioned by Peter Hamburger for the Memorial Concert of Esther Salaman performed at the Royal Academy of Music (Opus 87)
- 2010 : 12 songs to the Story of Parzival for Baritone and Flute - Text Lindsay Clarke (Opus 101)

=== For Solo Guitar ===
- 1985 (revised 2010) : Isn't it amazing (Opus 1)
- 2009 : exercise for Bar – chord (Opus 96)
- 2009 : Balkan Duo (Opus 97)

=== Chamber pieces, Concertos and Oratorio ===
- 1988 : Various Pieces for Clar. Flu. viol. Cell. and percussion. [commissioned work] (Opus 13 no.1)
- 1989 : Piece for flute and cello (Opus 14 )
- 1990 : Various Pieces for flu.2 violins and percussions, commissioned work (Opus 13 no.2)
- 1990 : Various Pieces for flute, 2 violins and percussions, commissioned work (Opus 13 no.3)
- 1990 - 1991 : Concerto in 1 movement for violin and chamber-ensemble (Opus 23)
- 1995 : Quartet for Flute and strings in 3 movements, commissioned work (Opus 31)
- 1996 - 1997 : 3 pieces for 2 violins, flute, 2 recorders, cello, and accordion (Opus 41)
- 1997 - 1998 : The Story of Elijah Oratorio in 4 movements for Tenor, choir and Orchestra, commissioned work (Opus 45)
- 1998 - 1999 : Ubi Caritas Piece for choir and orchestra (Opus 50)
- 1997 - 2003 : Concerto for Viola and Chamber orchestra in 3 Movements, dedicated to Rivka Golani (Opus 51)
- 1997 - 2004 : Concerto for Orchestra in 3 Movements - Adaptet from Viola Concerto (Opus 52)
- 1998 - 2000 : Suite for small orchestra in 5 Movements (Opus 53)
- 2000 : 10 songs for voice and violin (to poems and prose by R.M.Rilke), commissioned work (Opus 54)
- 2001 : 2 Songs for tenor and violin (to texts by Stibill and Hammerskjold), commissioned work (Opus 55)
- 2001 : Die Herausforderung (A new version of the preamble to the Human Rights Declaration in German) for tenor, choir, violin and piano (Opus 59)
- 2002 : 2 songs for tenor and violin (Love's Ground adapt. and Stibill.), commissioned work (Opus 61)
- 1998 - 2002 : Sne (part 1 of the work Forventning by Halfdan Rasmussen) 11 pieces for Solo-Soprano, Choir SATB and string Quartet (Opus 62)
- 2002 : The Challenge (A new version of the preamble to the Human Rights Declaration in English) for Tenor, Choir, violin and piano (Opus 63)
- 2003 : Pater Noster for Baritone and Stringquartet (Opus 69)
- 2003 : Mørke 4 songs for Soprano, Baritone, Trumpet, Harp and Double Bass - Text H. Rasmussen (Opus 70)
- 2003 : Three Tales for Oboe and Harp dedicated to Jinny Shaw and Lucy Wakeford of the Okeanos Ensemble (Opus 71)
- 2007 - 2008 : The Word for Choir and Chamberensemble. 23 minutes words by St. John, G. Brinch, Charles Darwin and Martin Luther King (Opus 91)
- 2009 : Windquintet in 4 movements (1st version) (Opus 94)
- 2009 - 2010 : Parzival Suite 5 Pieces for Solo Flute dedicated to Julie Groves (Opus 95)

1. The Fool
2. Anforta's Dream
3. The Heart of the Matter
4. The enchanted Castle
5. Searching for the Grail

- 2012 : Pyramids orchestral piece for children (to play) based on the Balkan duo (Opus 109)

== Discography ==
- The CD ‘Blue Harmony’ features the piano-works recorded by internationally acclaimed pianist Diana Baker, issued on Klyde records – Brinch's private label
- The CD ‘Harmonious Dissonance’ includes the String Quartet No.1 was released on Parma Records in USA in June 2010.
- The cd “Parzival” is a collaboration with award-winning Flautist Julie Groves and Whitbread-Prize winning author Lindsay Clarke, which resulted in a number of works for Baritone and Flute and Flute solo on the theme of Parzival. Not commercially released.
- Of three volumes of Chamber works on the Claudio Records Label Gregers Brinch volume one with Rohan de Saram and William Hancox and the Bergersen Quartet was released in 2012, featuring Sonatas no.1 & 2 for Cello and Piano and the String Quartet no.2.
- As a singer Brinch has recorded songs by the composer Dorothee Fischer together with the pianist William Hancox. Lieder und Klavierwerke von Dorothee Fischer, issued on Klyde records – Brinch's private label
