= Jakob Schive =

Jakob Schive (29 April 1897 – 12 October 1969) was a Norwegian military officer, geodesist and Milorg pioneer.

== Career ==
Schive was born in Kristiania, a son of headmaster Jens Christopher Delphin Schive and Jacobæa Berner. He was a military officer from 1918, and graduated from the Norwegian Military College in 1921, in geodesy and mathematics. He was appointed at the Norwegian Mapping and Cadastre Authority from 1921.

During the German occupation of Norway he participated in the Norwegian Campaign in 1940. In 1941 he was part of the leadership of Milorg until October, when he moved to London. He served at the Norwegian High Command in London from 1942 to 1945. From 1945 he lectured in topography at the Norwegian Military Academy. In the military ranking system, he was promoted to colonel in 1956.

He was decorated with the King's Commendation for Brave Conduct.
