= Oliver H. Langeland =

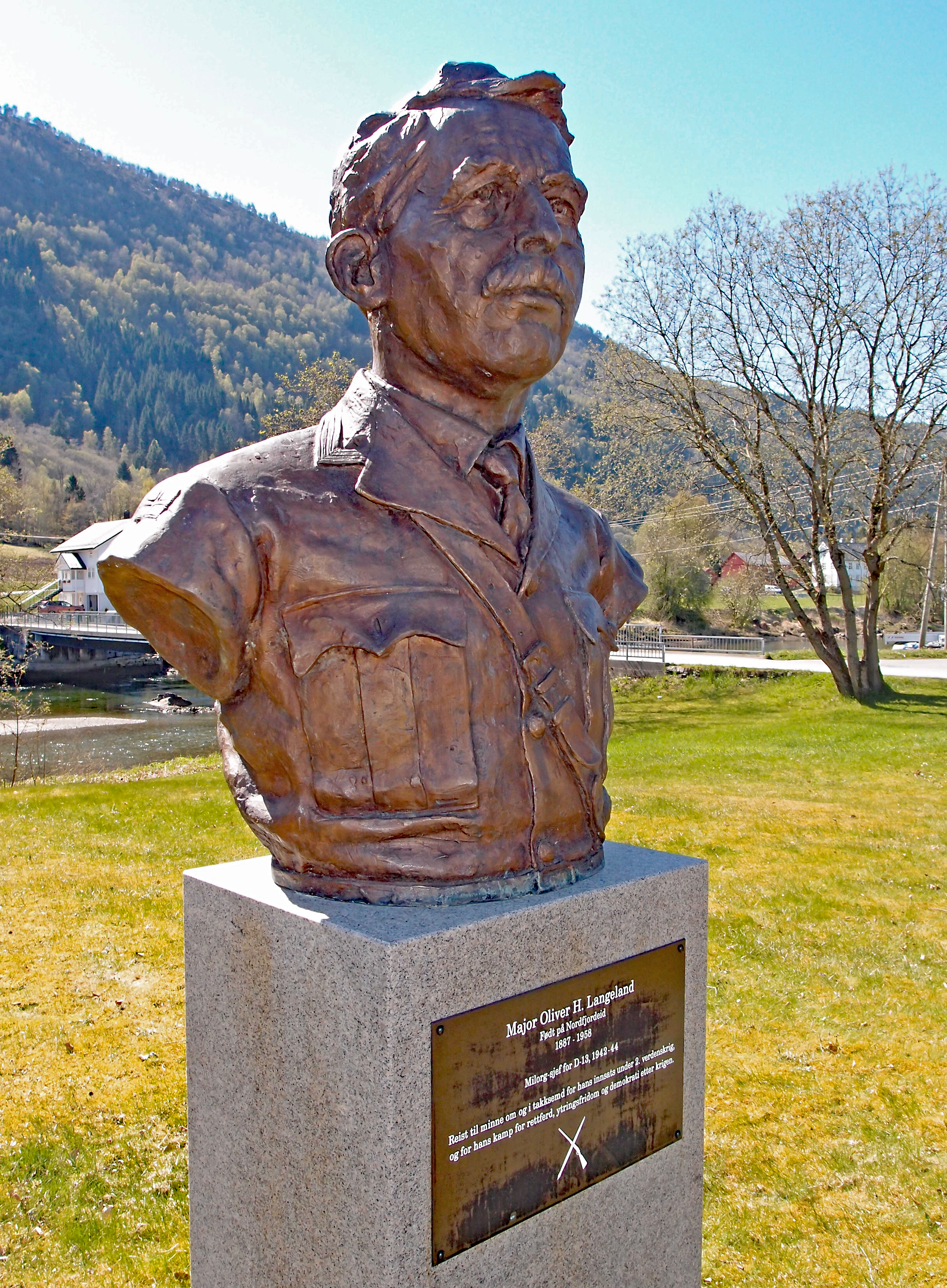

Oliver Hansen Langeland (30 January 1887 – 9 February 1958) was a Norwegian military officer and civil servant. He had careers in both civil service and the military, and is best known as leader of Milorg District 13 from 1942 to 1944.

== Pre-war life and career ==
He was born in Eid Municipality as a son of farmers Hans Langeland (1844–1928) and Kari Hildenes (1847–1939). In 1915 he married Susanne Andrea Augusta Harwig, daughter of a Methodist priest. He graduated as a petty officer in 1908, and advanced to the rank of first lieutenant in 1912, reaching the rank of captain in 1915. In 1929 he left the army. He also took the examen artium in 1910, and graduated from the Royal Frederick University in Kristiania with the cand.oecon. degree in economics in 1913.

From 1915 to 1918 he lived in Saltdal Municipality where he ran a private middle school. He then moved back to Kristiania and worked as an inspector and statistician in the city's tax authority. From 1929 he was a secretary in the municipal resident register and statistical officer. He returned to the tax authority in 1941 as office manager, advancing to head of department in 1945. He wrote several articles and pamphlets about statistics, housing, tax questions and the city's demography. He released the book Det er liv eller død det gjelder in 1937. He also contributed with two articles on the defence issue in the national socialist periodical Ragnarok, both in 1938.

== World War II and post-war life ==
During the occupation of Norway by Nazi Germany he was the leader of Milorg District 13 (D13), from November 1942 to July/August 1944. D13 covered Oslo Municipality, Aker Municipality, Bærum Municipality, and Asker Municipality. He reached the rank of major.

In his book Dømmer ikke ("Do Not Judge") from 1948, he criticized the legal purge after the war. He sharply criticized the sitting cabinet in the pre-war and war years (1935 to 1945), Nygaardsvold's Cabinet, for having guilt in the German occupation that befell Norway. Langeland called for impeachment of the cabinet members. He also lambasted the conviction of the several people who had held passive membership of the now-banned political party Nasjonal Samling.

For the book Dømmer ikke, the Norwegian Prosecuting Authority raised a libel case against Langeland. Langeland was acquitted of libel in 1950, but passages in the book were declared null and void and the book was confiscated.

Langeland died in 1958. Dømmer ikke was re-issued in 2009. A similar book, Forat I ikke skal dømmes ("Lest Ye Be Judged"), was issued in 1949, subsequently confiscated and then re-issued in 2010.
