= Norwegian High Command =

The Norwegian High Command (Norwegian: Forsvarets Overkommando, FO) was Norway's top military leadership from 1970 to 2003. It was established in Northern Norway in 1940 by General Otto Ruge. It was then re-established by the Norwegian Government-in-exile in London in 1942, lasting until 1946. The High Command was re-established in 1970, lasting until 2003, when a different organization was formed.

== World War II ==
The Norwegian High Command was re-established on 6 February 1942. Wilhelm von Tangen Hansteen was Chief of Defence until 1 July 1944, when Crown Prince Olav took over.

=== Organization ===
Among the offices were

- FO II, which dealt with intelligence.
- FO-IV had "responsibility for the Armed Forces military operations in Norway and the cooperation with Milorg" including Special Operations.
- FO's "hjemmekontor" (where Jacob Schive worked)
