= Akershus Fortress =

Medieval castle in Oslo, Norway

Coordinates: 59°54′24″N 10°44′10″E

Akershus slott og festning Castle and Fortress
- Oslo, Norway
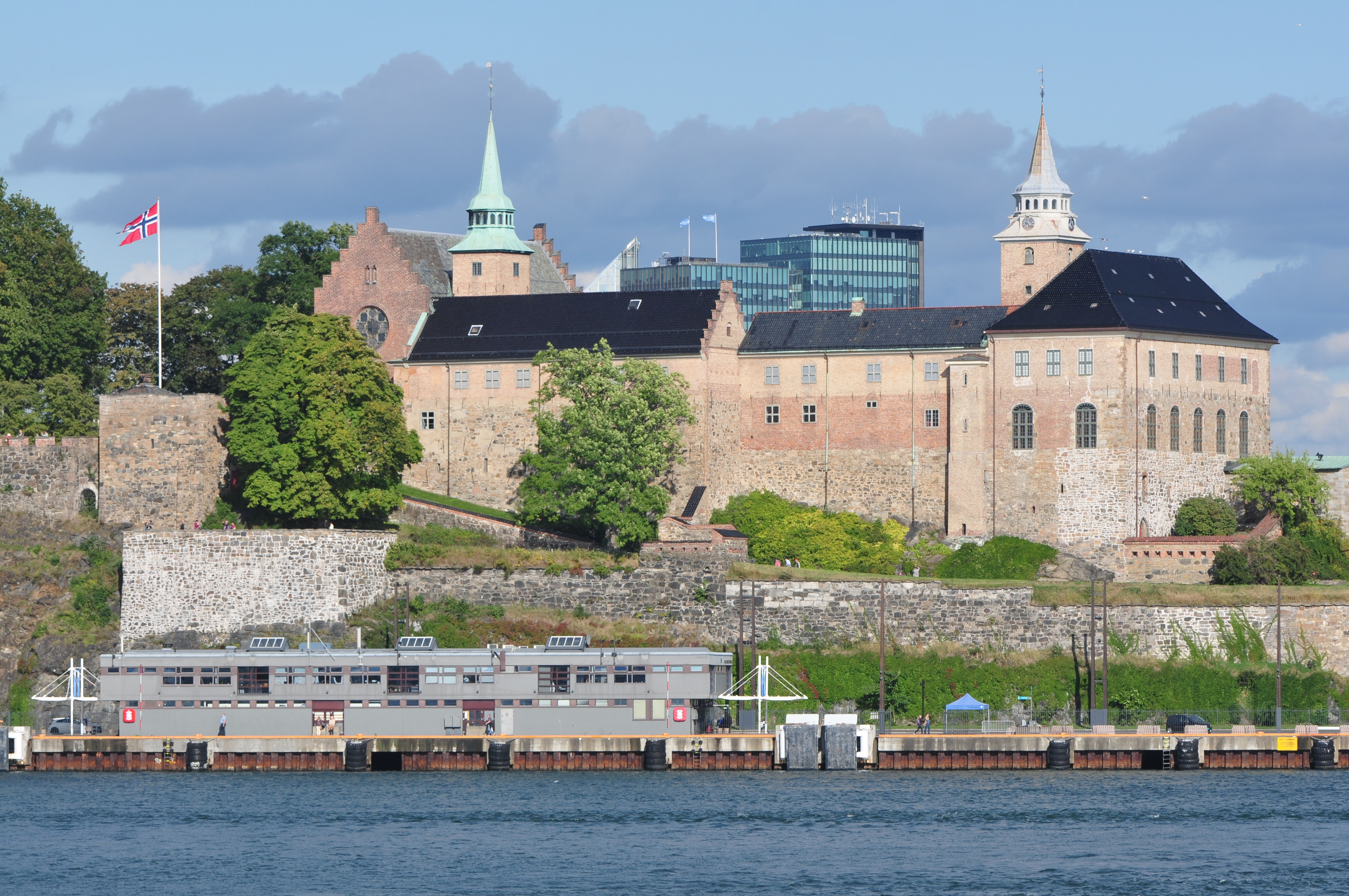
- Akershus Castle and Fortress

Site information
- Type: Castle; Royal residences
- Controlled by: Government of Norway; Norwegian Army; Norwegian royal family

Site history
- Built: 1290s
- In use: 1290s–present
- Materials: Stone

Garrison information
- Past commanders: Haakon IV; Haakon V Knut Alvsson; Ove Gjedde; Frederik Gottschalk von Haxthausen; Christian Roy Kaldager

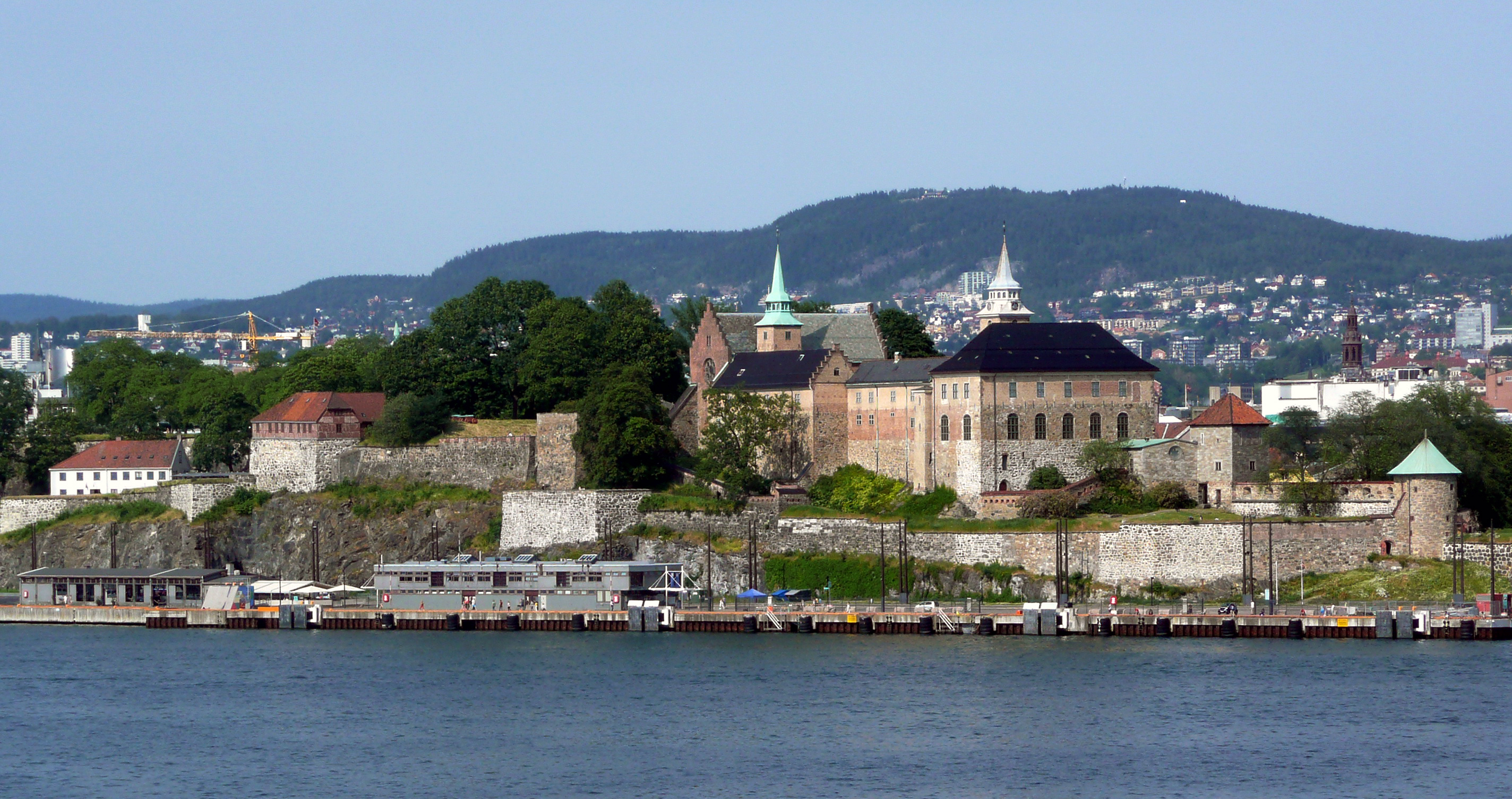
Akershus Castle and Fortress seen from Oslofjord

Akershus Fortress (Norwegian: Akershus Festning, pronounced [ɑkəʂˈhʉːs ˈfɛ̂sːtnɪŋ]) or Akershus Castle (Norwegian: Akershus slott [ɑkəʂˈhʉːs ˈslɔtː]) is a medieval castle in the Norwegian capital Oslo that was built to protect and provide a royal residence for the city. It is located on the banks of the Oslofjord. Since the Middle Ages the fortress has been the namesake and centre of the main fief and later main county of Akershus, which was originally one of Norway's four main regions and which included most of Eastern Norway. The fortress itself was located within the Akershus main county until 1919, and within the smaller Akershus sub-county until 1842.

The castle has also been used as a military base, a prison and is currently the temporary office of the prime minister of Norway.

== Construction ==
It is not known exactly when the construction of the castle started but it is believed that it took place around the late 1290s, by King Haakon V, replacing Tønsberg as one of the two most important Norwegian castles of the period (the other being Båhus). It was constructed in response to the Norwegian nobleman, Earl Alv Erlingsson of Sarpsborg's earlier attack on Oslo that occurred in 1287. In the aftermath of the attack, it became clear that the city's existing defences were not effective and therefore, a stronger defensive centre was needed.

The castle is mentioned in written sources for the first time in 1300 in a letter from King Haakon to a church in Oslo. However, the letter does not mention how far the construction of the castle had progressed by then.

The fortress has successfully survived all sieges, primarily by Swedish forces, including those by forces led by Charles XII in 1716.

== History and military use ==
=== The Middle Ages ===
The fortress was first used in battle in 1308, when it was besieged by the Swedish duke Erik Magnusson. The siege was eventually broken by a local Norwegian army in a battle. (This battle forms a major part of the plot of Sigrid Undset's historical novel In the Wilderness, the third volume of her tetralogy The Master of Hestviken.)

=== Renaissance and Denmark–Norway ===
The immediate proximity of the sea was a key feature, for naval power was a vital military force as the majority of Norwegian commerce in that period was by sea. The fortress was strategically important for the capital, and therefore, Norway as well. Whoever controlled Akershus fortress ruled Norway.

In 1449–1450 the castle was besieged again, this time by the Swedish king Karl Knutsson Bonde, but he had to lift the siege after a while. The castle was not besieged again until 1502 when Scottish soldiers in the service of the Danish–Norwegian king besieged the castle in order to regain it from the hands of the Norwegian nobleman Knut Alvsson.

Akershus was besieged yet again in 1523, this time by Swedish soldiers, but Oslo's inhabitants, at the command of Hans Mule, burned down their houses in an attempt to drive them out and the Swedes retreated after a short period. King Christian II besieged the castle from 1531 to 1532 but the siege was lifted by forces from Denmark and Lübeck. After this siege the castle was improved and strengthened.

In 1567, during the Northern Seven Years' War, the castle was besieged once more by Swedish forces, but the Danish–Norwegian king's lord lieutenant, Christen Munk, responded by burning down the city in order to deprive the attackers themselves of the means of receiving supplies, and eventually the Swedes

=== World War II ===
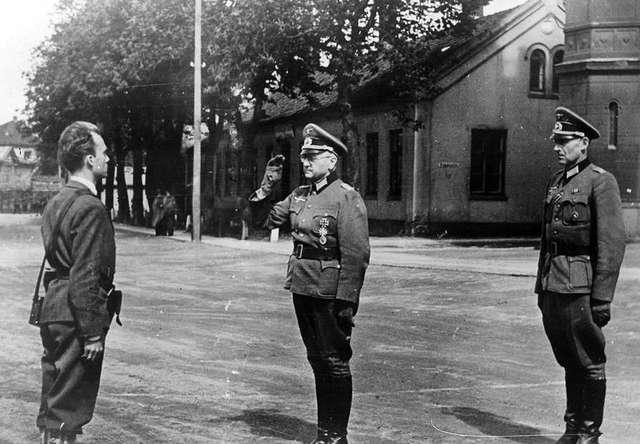
The German garrison's commander Major Josef Nichterlein and his aide Captain Johannes Hamel handing the fortress over to the Norwegian resistance movement's Terje Rollem (May 11, 1945)

The fortress has never successfully been besieged by a foreign enemy. However it surrendered without combat to Nazi Germany in 1940 when the Norwegian government evacuated the capital in the face of the unprovoked German assault on Denmark and Norway (see Operation Weserübung).

During World War II, people were executed here by the German occupiers, including members of the Pelle group. The fortress was liberated on 11 May 1945, when it was handed over to Terje Rollem on behalf of the Norwegian resistance movement. After the war, eight Norwegian traitors who had been tried for war crimes and sentenced to death were also executed at the fortress. Among those executed were Vidkun Quisling and Siegfried Fehmer.

== Royal residence ==
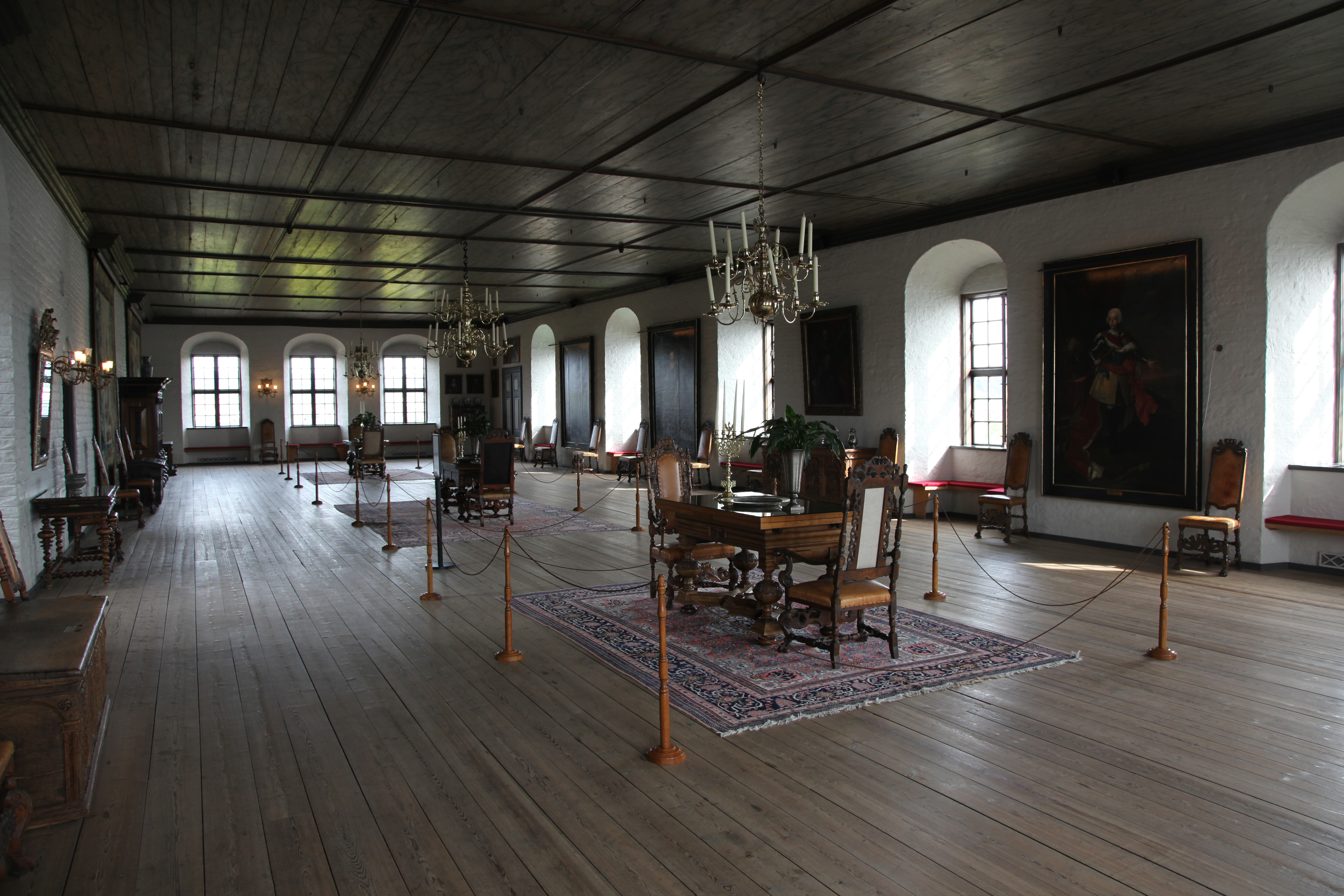
The hall of King Christian IV

=== During the Middle Ages ===
After construction of the castle was finished around 1300, Haakon V gradually started to use the castle as a residential palace, favoring the keep over the Oslo Kongsgård estate despite the fact that the castle likely was unsuited as a residence. The castle becoming a royal residence also played a significant role in the process where the capital of Norway was moved from Bergen to Oslo. Several significant figures from the Norwegian middle ages, including Haakon V, Queen Euphemia, Ingeborg Eriksdottir and Queen Margaret, all resided at the castle, which functioned as the official Norwegian royal residence for several decades. The last Norwegian king prior to the establishment of the Kalmar Union, Olaf II, was born at the castle in 1370.

=== Anne of Denmark and James VI of Scotland ===
In September 1589, Anne of Denmark tried to sail to Scotland when she was betrothed to King James VI, but after difficulties with her ships and weather, she made her way to Akershus with the Scottish Earl Marischal. After they married, when they were at Elsinore (Kronborg), a servant of Axel Gyldenstierne, captain of Akershus, was rewarded for bringing letters to the Scottish king.

=== Restoration and palace ===
Following the great fire of 1624, King Christian IV made the decision to relocate and rebuild the entire city of Oslo. The king ordered the new city to be located closer to Akershus Fortress, renaming the city Christiania. The fortress was subsequently modernized and remodeled, with the new appearance being that of a renaissance castle with Italian inspired bastions. The castle primarily functioned as a palace until the turn of the 19th century, with new towers, halls, chambers and gates being added over time.

When the king was absent, the castle functioned as the seat of the Steward of Norway.

== Prison ==
Akershus has also been a prison, with a section of it known as The Slavery (Norwegian: Slaveriet) because the prisoners could be rented out for work in the city. It has housed many rebels and criminals through Norwegian history. Particularly well-known people to have been imprisoned there include author Gjest Baardsen (1791–1849), and the similarly idealized thief Ole Høiland. Also, many early Norwegian socialists (supporters of Marcus Thrane, 1817–1890) also spent time in the cells of Akershus. The prison was also a plot element in the film Fante-Anne (1920).

=== Kautokeino rebellion prisoners ===
Following the 1852 Laestadian Sámi revolt in Guovdageaidnu, all men except the two leaders Aslak Hætta and Mons Somby (who were beheaded in Alta) ended up in Akershus Fortress – the women were imprisoned in Trondheim. Many of the rebels died after a few years in captivity. Among the survivors was Lars Hætta (18 years at the time of imprisonment), who during his stay was allowed time and means to write the first translation of the Bible into North Sámi.

== Current use ==
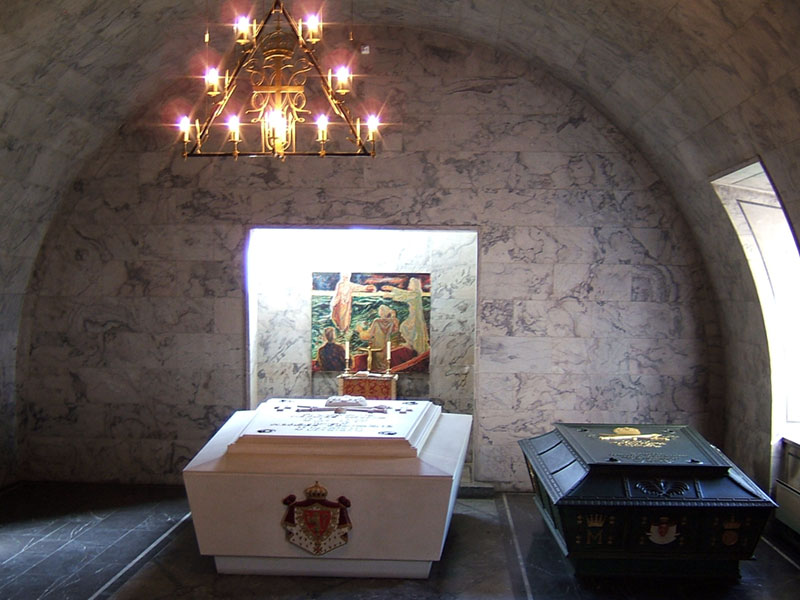
The sarcophagi of King Haakon VII, Queen Maud (the white sarcophagus), King Olav V and Crown Princess Märtha (the green sarcophagus)

Although still a military area, the Akershus Fortress is open to the public between 6:00 and 21:00 daily. As well as the castle, the Norwegian Armed Forces Museum and Norway's Resistance Museum can also be visited. The Norwegian Ministry of Defence and the country's Defence Staff Norway share a joint modern headquarters in the eastern part of the fortress. His Majesty the King's Guard is responsible for guarding the fortress, with stationary guard posts during open hours and mobile patrols at night. One of the stationary guard posts at the entrance is a popular photography spot for tourists visiting the fortress. Since restoration of the main building, the castle has frequently been used as the venue for official events and dinners for dignitaries and foreign heads of state.

=== Royal Mausoleum ===
The castle's Royal Mausoleum is the final resting place of a number of Norwegian royal figures. This includes King Sigurd I, King Haakon V, Queen Euphemia, King Haakon VII, Queen Maud, King Olav V, Crown Princess Märtha and King Harald V.

=== Office of the Prime Minister ===
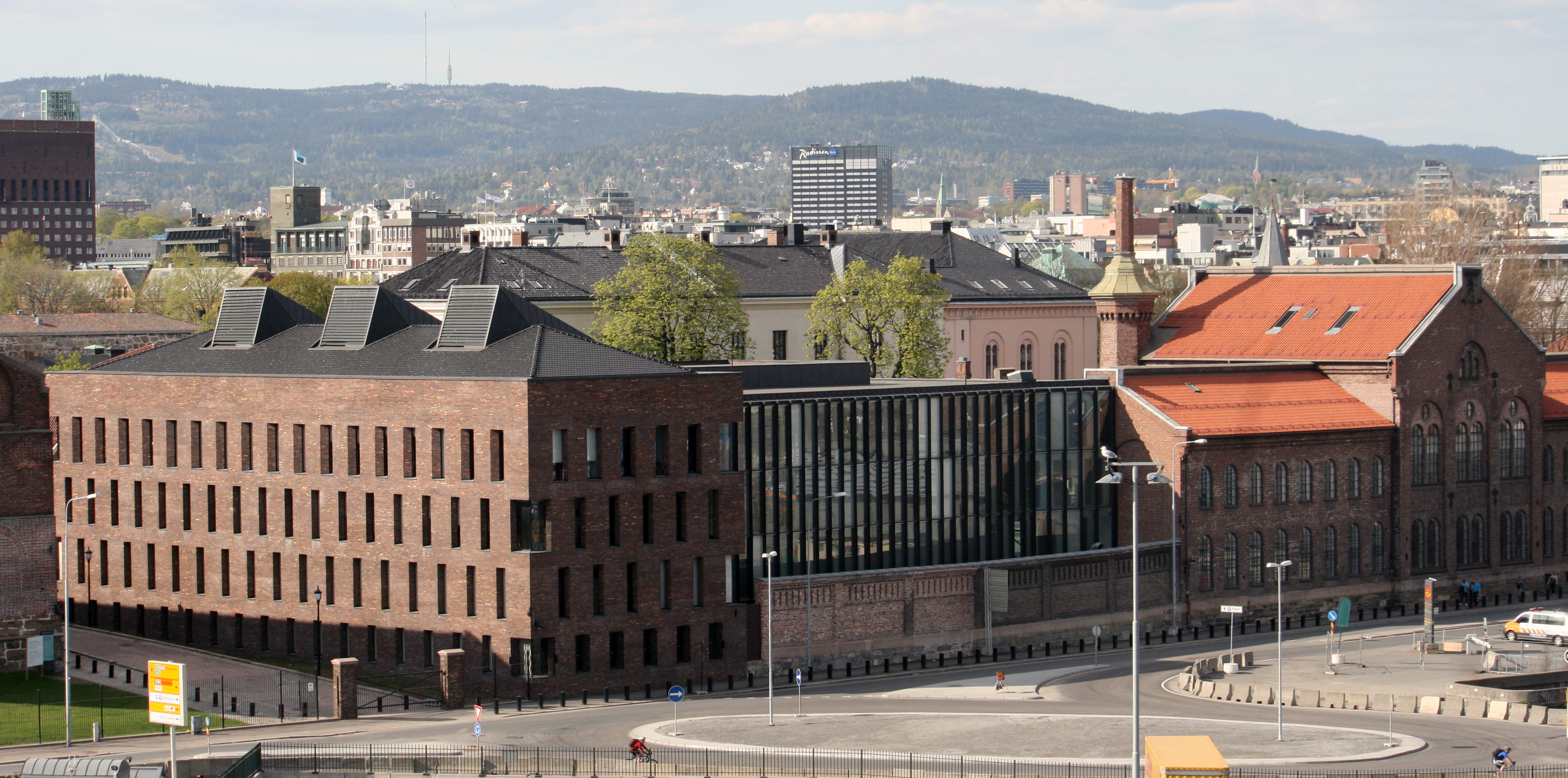
Glacisgata 1, the temporary seat of the prime minister of Norway

After the 22 July attacks in 2011, the Office of the Norwegian prime minister has been located close to the fortress in a building that originally belonged to the Norwegian Ministry of Defence.

== Imitation ==
Walt Disney World in Florida, United States, replicates a portion of the fortress at the Norway Pavilion at its Epcot theme park. In a further reference to Akershus' royal history, the Epcot replication also houses a Disney Princess character restaurant called Akershus Royal Banquet Hall, which also serves some Norwegian dishes.

== Gallery ==
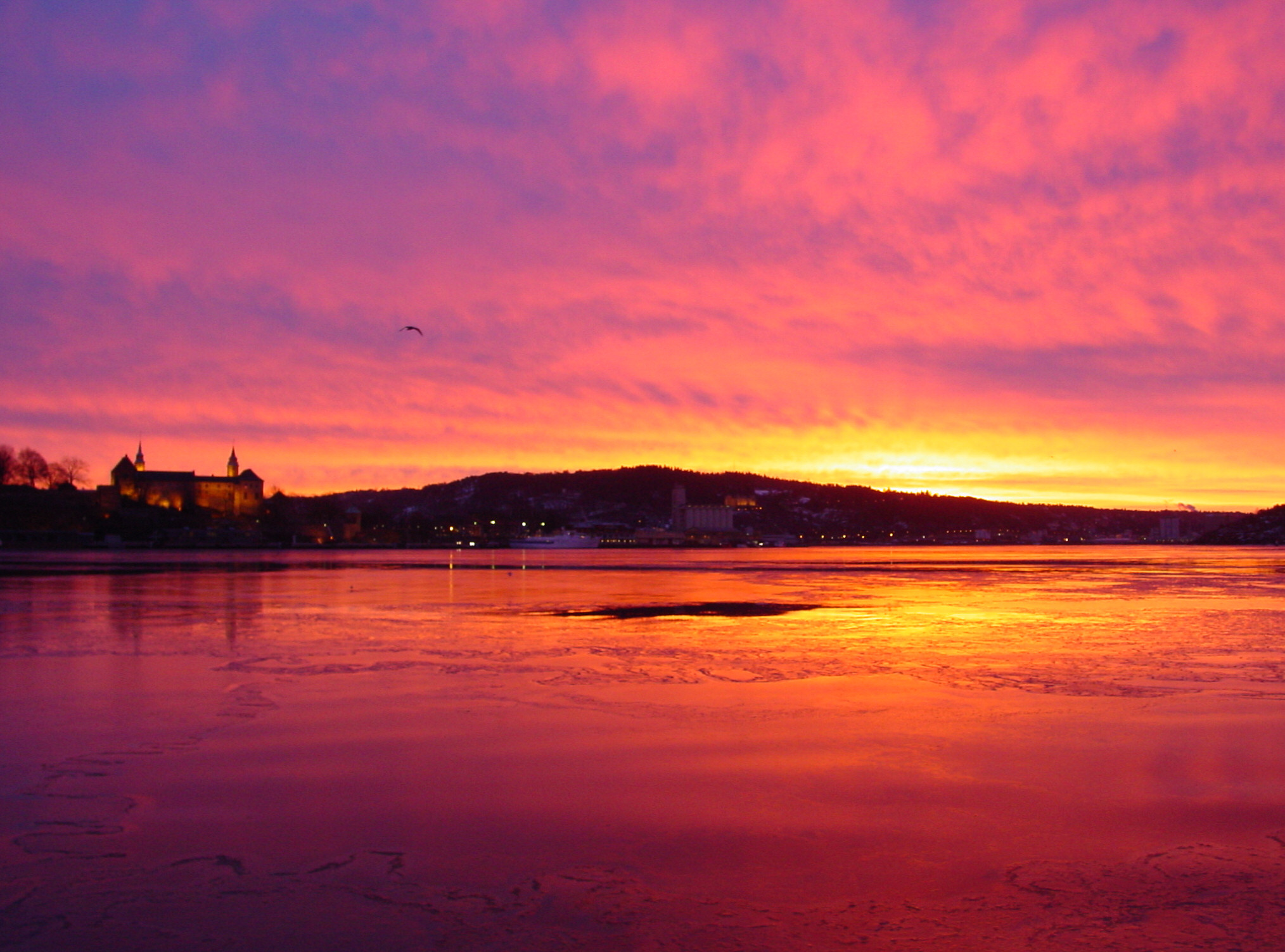
The fortress right in the middle of Oslo Harbour

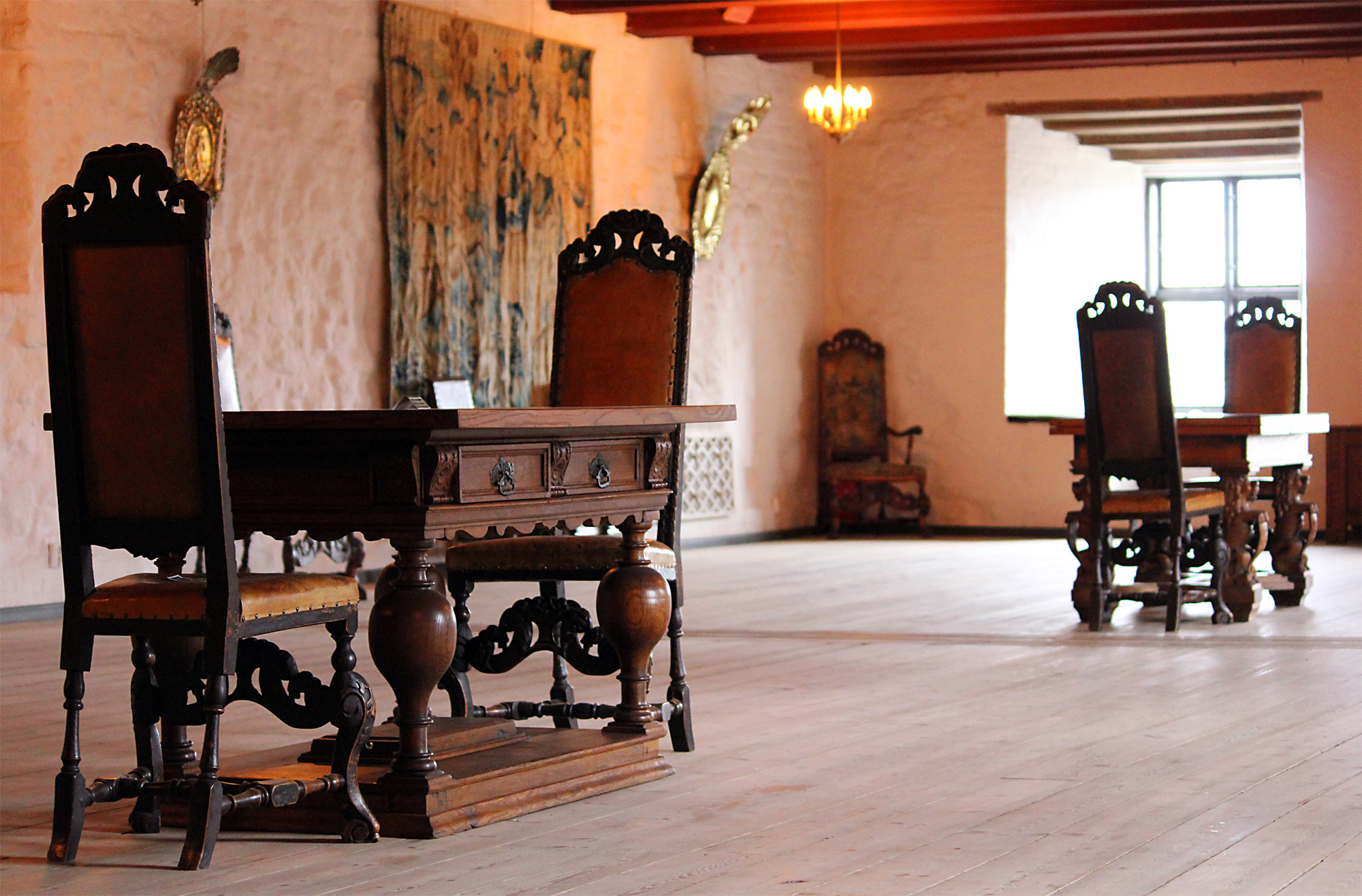
Inside Akershus Castle

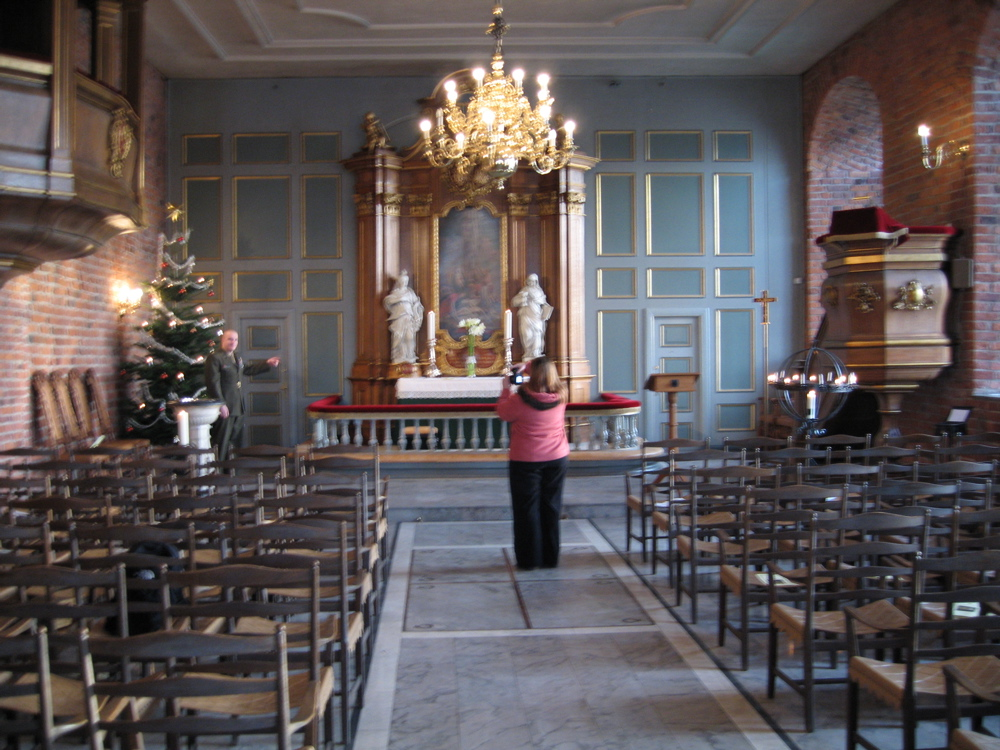
Inside the Akershus Castle church

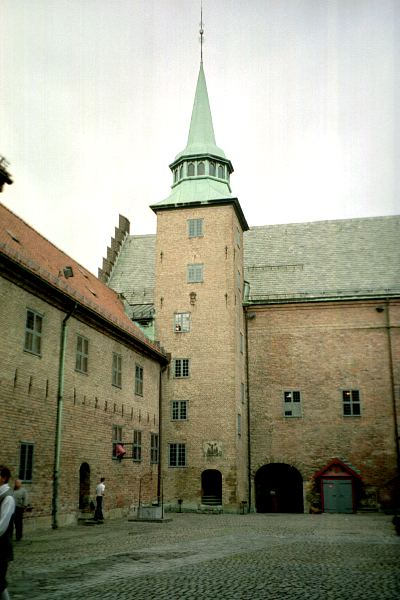
Akershus Castle

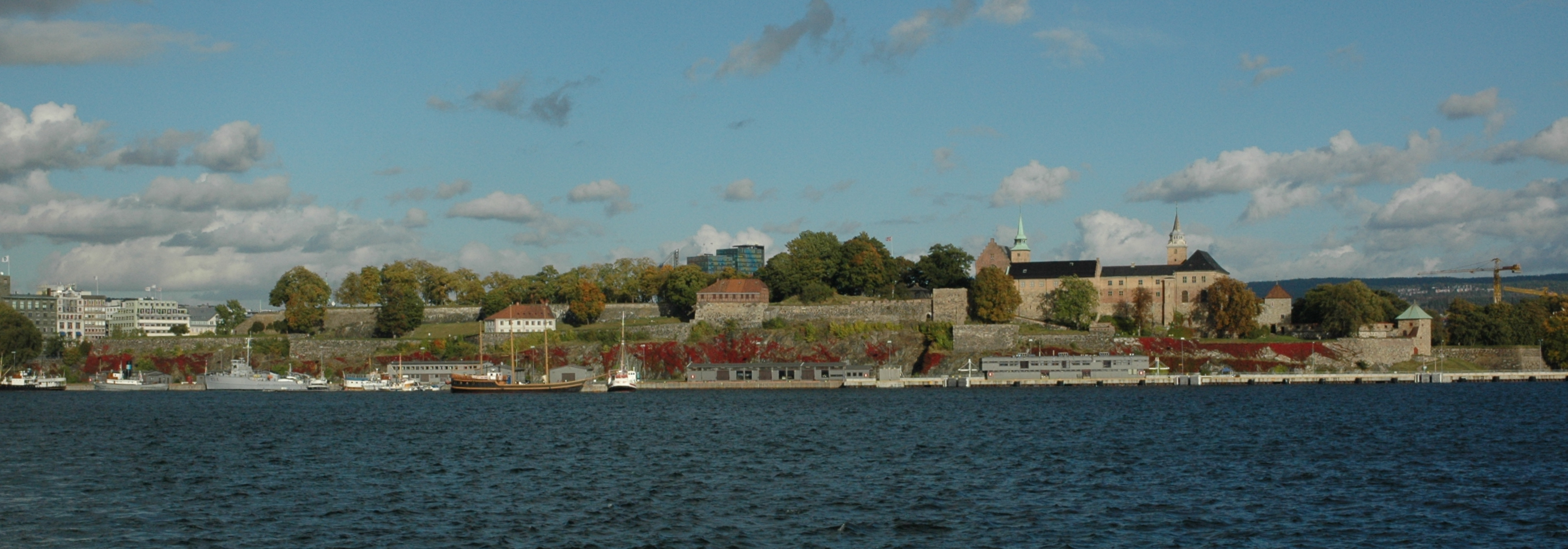
Akershus fortress seen from the west

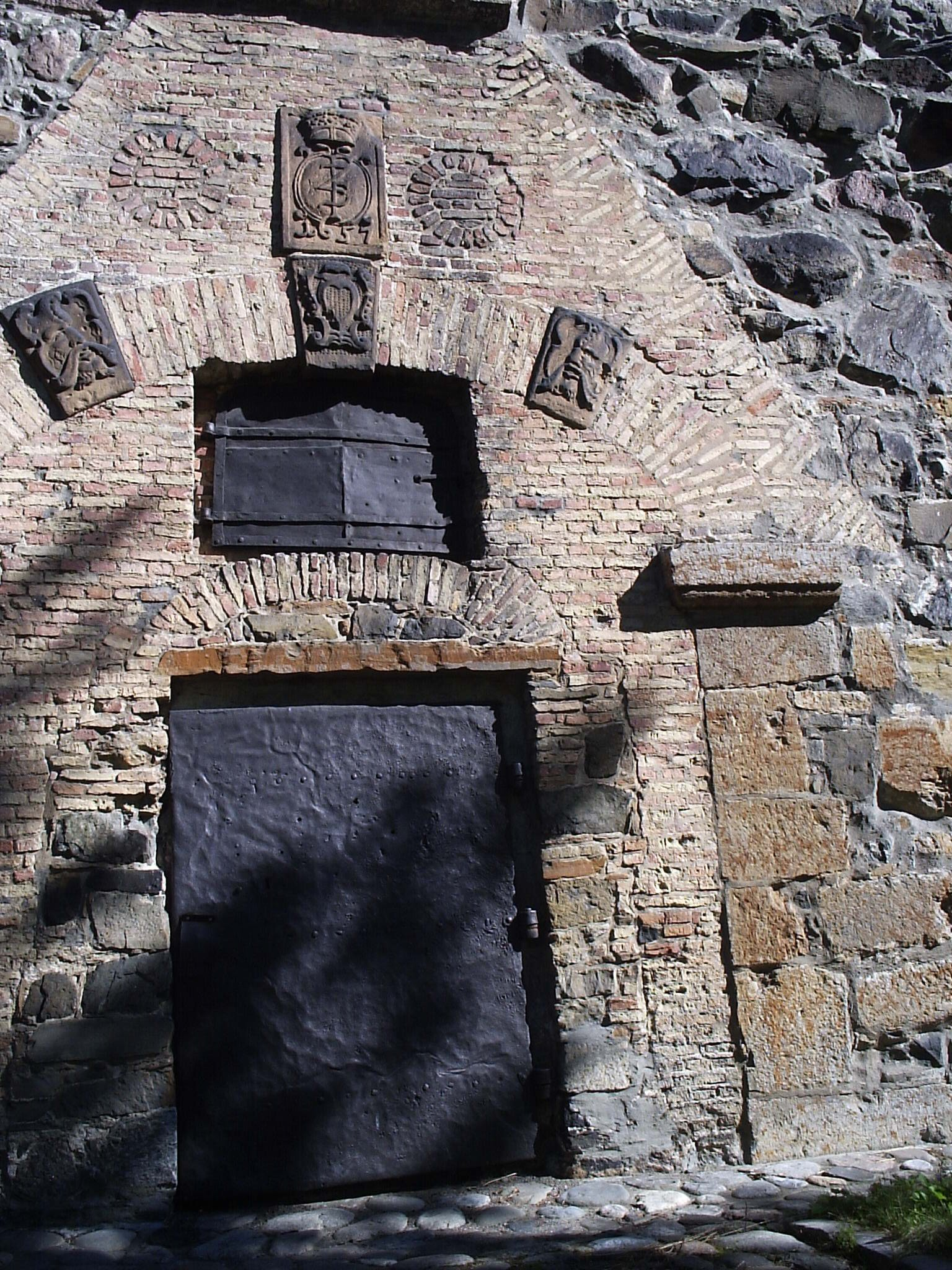
The armoury door

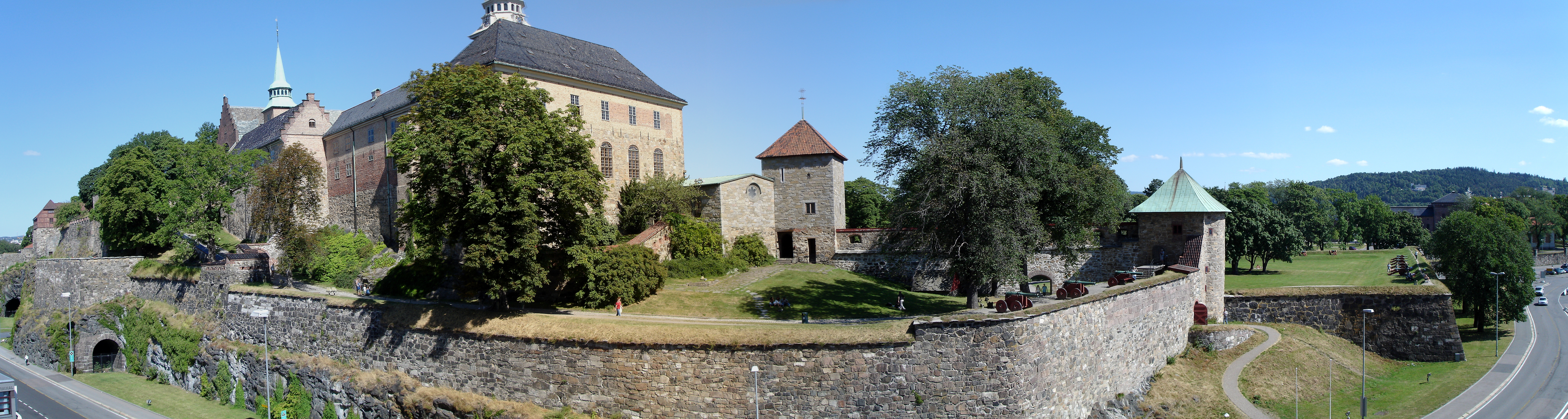
Panorama of Akershus Castle from the seafront

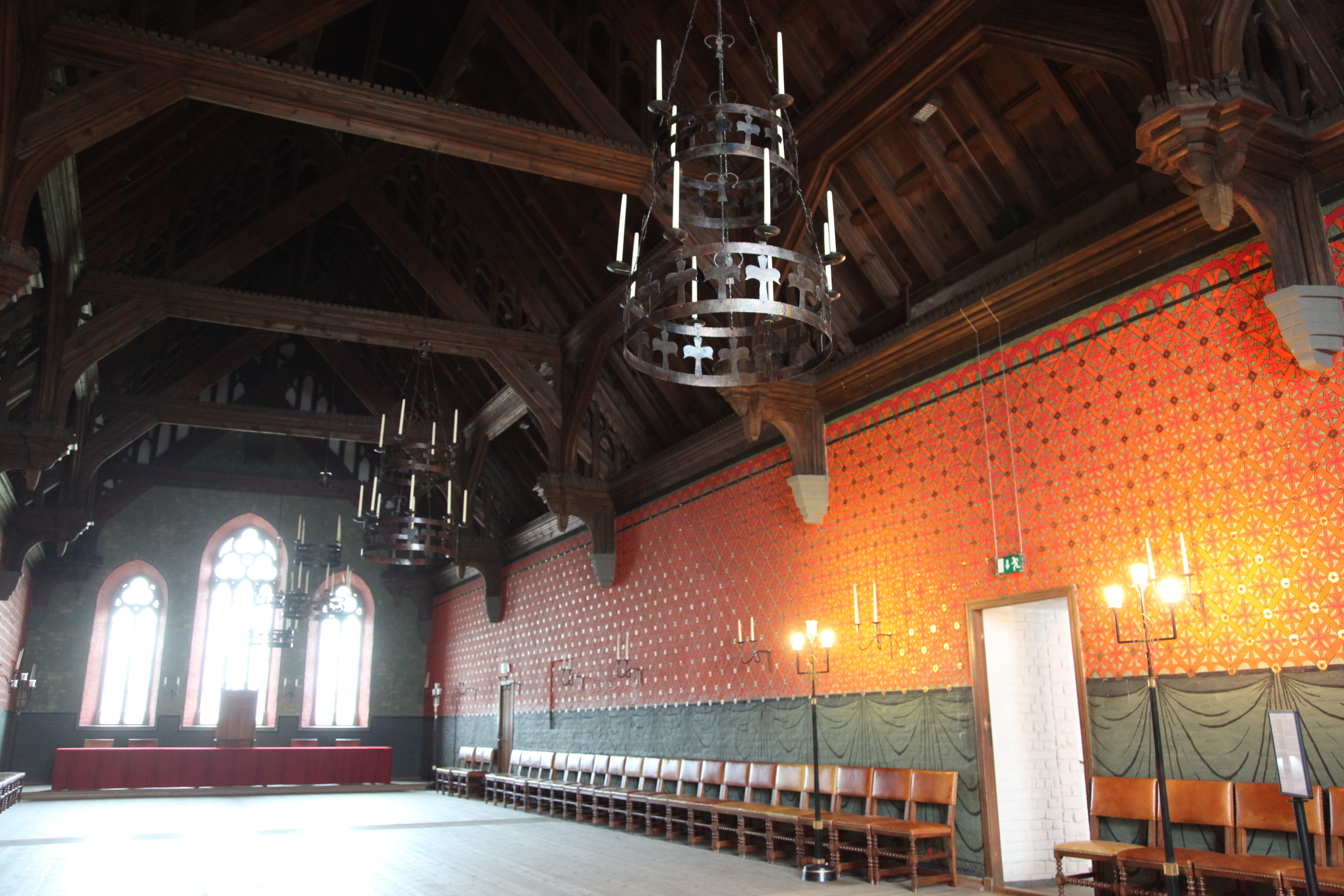
Olav V's hall

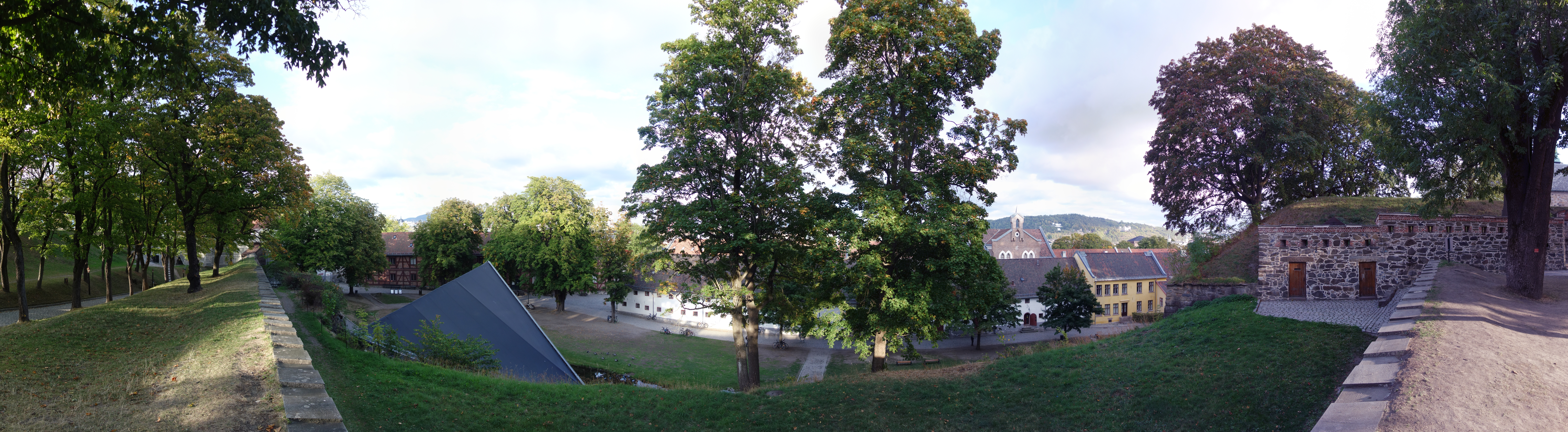
Courtyard overlooking Karpedammen pond

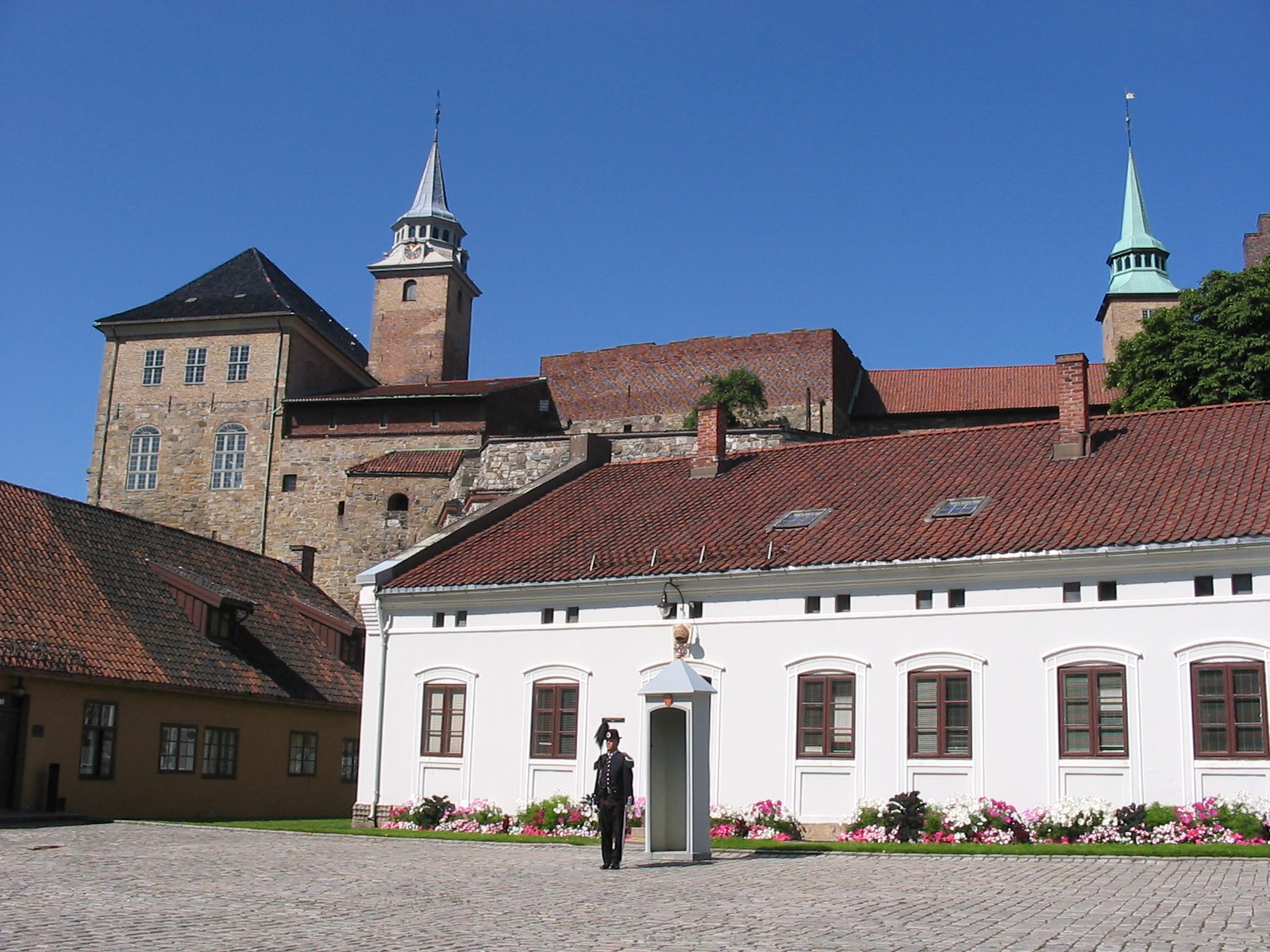
Looking west from Michael von Sundts Plass

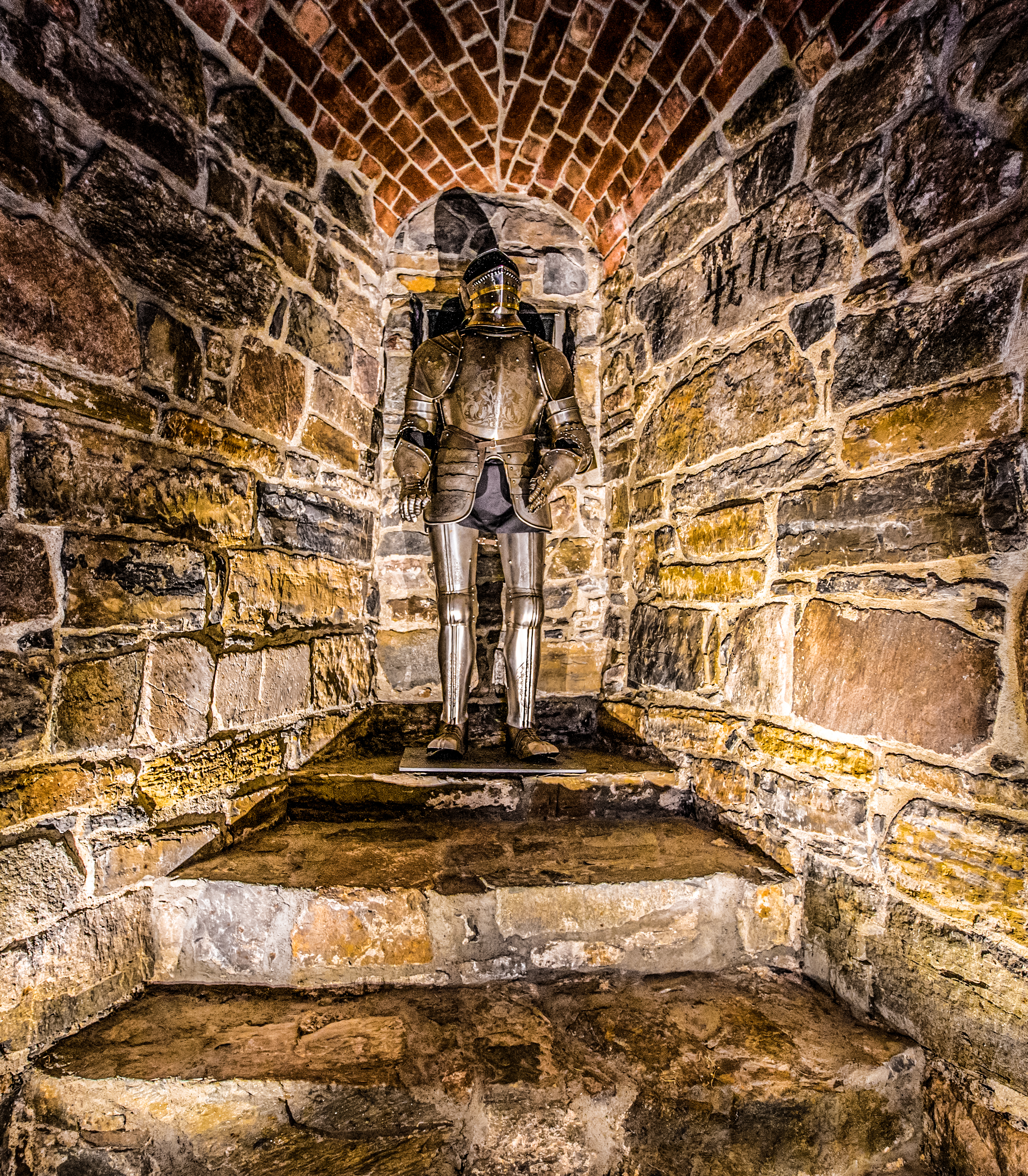
Armor in Akershus Fortress

== Commanders of Akershus Fortress ==
The year is that in which they first took command.

- 1516 – Hans Mule
- 1629 – Ove Gjedde
- 1654 – Georg Reichwein
- 1662 – Hans Jacob Schort
- 1670 – Michael Opitz
- 1676 – Frants Eberhard von Speckhan
- 1679 – Ejler Jensen Visborg
- 1680 – Hans Brostrup Schort
- 1687 – Anton Coucheron
- 1690 – Nikolaj de Seve
- 1706 – Hans Frederik Legel
- 1708 – Ernst Bugislav Waldau
- 1709 – Johan Frederik Münnich
- 1711 – Nikolaj Sibbern
- 1712 – Jørgen Christopher von Klenow
- 1719 – Georg von Bertouch
- 1740 – Johan Frederik Leben
- 1744 – Jonas Bjørnsen
- 1762 – Frans Grabow
- 1772 – Christopher Frederik Ingenhaeff
- 1774 – Hans Jacob Henning Hesselberg
- 1806 – Frederik Gottschalck von Haxthausen
- (incomplete)
- Current – Geir Holmenes

== Museums at Akershus Fortress ==
- Armed Forces Museum
- Norway's Resistance Museum
- The Prison Museum at Akershus Fortress
