= Lorentz Brinch =

Norwegian politician

Lorentez Brinch
- Born: Lorentz Wilhelm Brinch; 9 May 1910; Kristiania, Norway
- Died: 20 May 1953 (aged 43)
- Occupations: Barrister, Banker and Politician
- Relatives: Christian Brinch (brother)

Lorentz Wilhelm Brinch (9 May 1910 – 20 May 1953) was a Norwegian barrister, military officer, banker and politician for the Conservative Party.

== Pre-war life ==
He was born in Kristiania as a son of barrister Christian Nicolay Brinch (1861–1946) and Anna Catharina Rolfsen (1870–1947). He was a brother of civil servant Christian Nicolay Keyser Brinch. In 1942 he married Anna Marta Ida Elisabeth Højer, daughter of the then-Swedish ambassador to Norway.

He finished his secondary education in 1928, attended the Norwegian Military Academy and graduated from the academy's lower section in 1929 as a sergeant in the infantry. He became a second lieutenant in the reserves in 1930, and served with Infantry Regiment 15 and Infantry Regiment 1 that year. Brinch attended a course in military intelligence in 1931 and a medical officer course in 1933. Next to his regular military service, Brinch joined the voluntary military training organization Leidangen, where he served as an instructor.

Also taking civilian education, he graduated with the cand.jur. degree from the Royal Frederick University in 1933, starting the law firm Brinch & Lyche. After a period as deputy judge from 1934 to 1935 he worked as an attorney from 1936 and barrister with access to work with Supreme Court cases from 1940.

== World War II ==
During the Norwegian Campaign he participated in battle at Ringerike. He then held the rank of captain. During the subsequent occupation of Norway by Nazi Germany he was the leader of Milorg district 13 (D13), from 1944 to 1945, succeeding Oliver H. Langeland. The D13 district covered Oslo, Aker, Bærum and Asker, and had a total of about 7,000 soldiers at the end of World War II. He was decorated with the Defence Medal 1940–1945.

== Post-war career ==
After the war, in 1945, Brinch became war advocate for Eastern Norway during the legal purge in Norway after World War II. From 1946 to 1948 he served as the acting Judge Advocate General of the Norwegian Armed Forces. From 1948 he was a director in Den norske Creditbank. He was also a deputy representative to the Parliament of Norway from Oslo during the term 1945–1949.

He chaired the supervisory council of Morgenbladet since 1945, was a board member of Den norske Creditbank and supervisory council member of Storebrand, Idun, Norske Kredit-Atlas, Norsk Sprængstofindustri and Oslo Sparebank. He died in May 1953. A portrait of Brinch was painted by Alf Rolfsen and unveiled in Oslo Militære Samfund in 1968.

Military offices
Preceded by Oliver H. Langeland	Leader of Milorg District 13; 1944–1945	Succeeded by position abolished
Preceded by Ørnulf Rød	Judge Advocate General of the Norwegian Armed Forces; 1946–1948	Succeeded by Ivar Follestad
