= Norway's Resistance Museum =

Coordinates: 59.9079°N 10.7358°E

- Norges Hjemmefrontmuseum
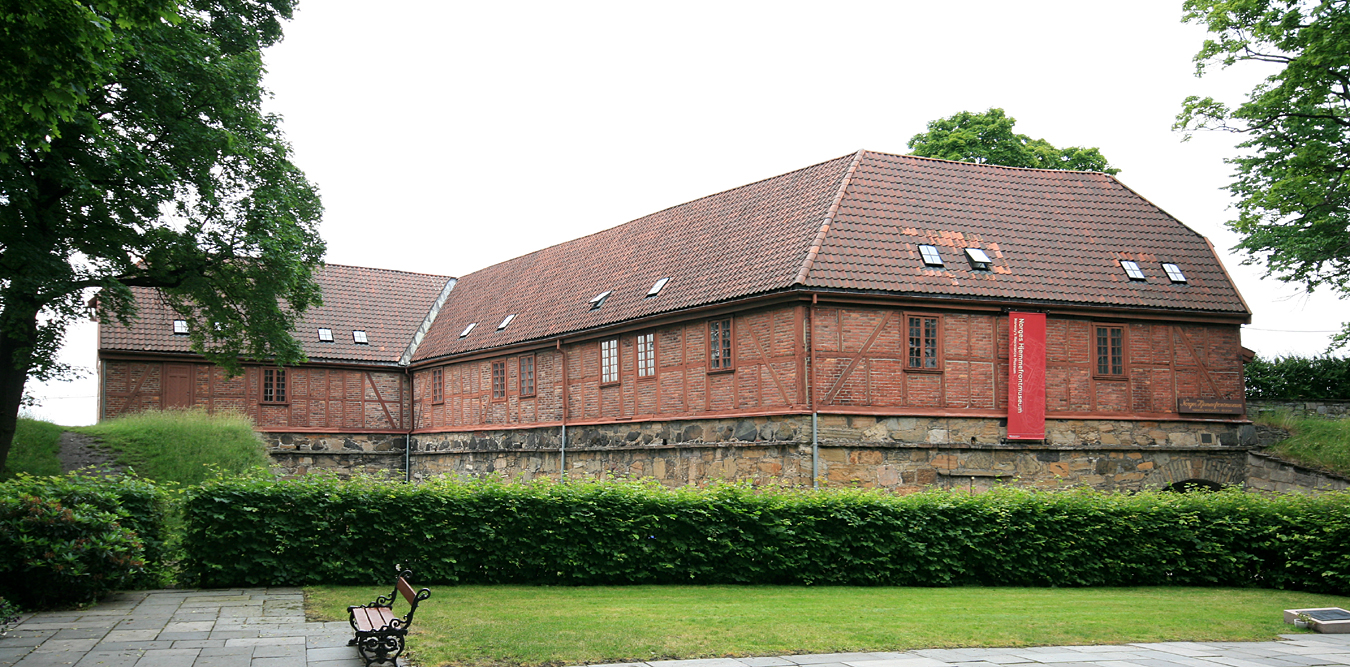
- The main exhibition building
- Established: 1966
- Location: Akershus Fortress, Oslo
- Type: World War II museum
- Website: http://forsvaretsmuseer.no/

Norway's Resistance Museum also known as the Norwegian Home Front Museum (Norwegian: Norges Hjemmefrontmuseum) is a museum located at the Akershus Fortress in Oslo.

The museum collection focuses on Norwegian resistance during the occupation of Norway by Nazi Germany from 1940 to 1945. The museum displays equipment, photos and documents from the war years.

The museum was established as a foundation in 1966.

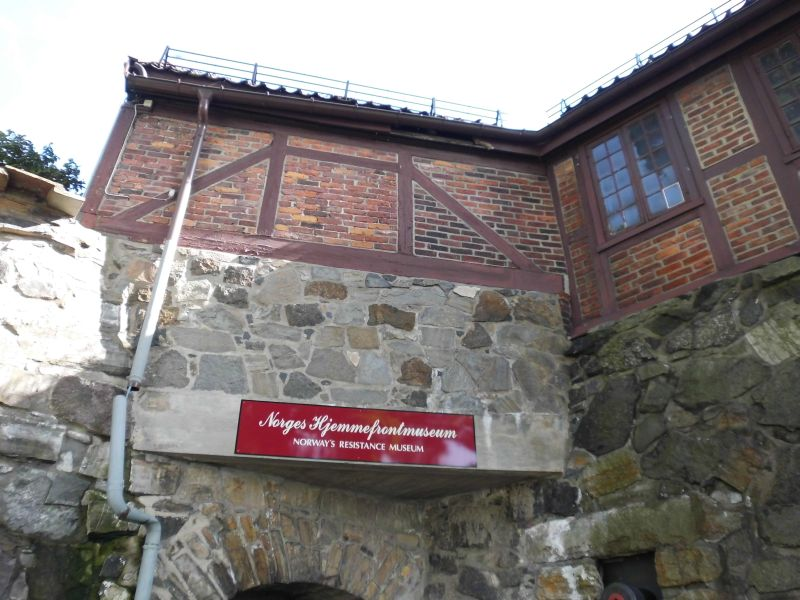
Norges Hjemmefrontmuseum signage

The museum's first manager was Knut Haugland, who managed the museum until 1983. Tore Gjelsvik was chairman of the museum's council from 1964 to 1973. Arnfinn Moland was appointed manager of the museum in 1995.

== Other sources ==
- Færøy, Frode (1997) Norges hjemmefrontmuseum: i stiftelsens år (Oslo: Norges hjemmefrontmuseum) ISBN 82-91107-07-6
