= Scandinavian theatre of World War II =

Military and political events in Scandinavia during World War II

- Part of the European theatre of World War II
- Map of the Nordic states
Date	30 November 1939–8 May 1945
Location	Finland, Denmark, Norway, Iceland, Greenland, the Faroe Islands, the Baltic Sea and the Arctic Ocean
Result	Allied victory
Territorial changes	Territorial cessions by Finland to the Soviet Union; Iceland severed ties with Denmark and established the Republic of Iceland

Belligerents
1939–1940; Finland	1939–1940; Soviet Union
1940; Germany	1940; Norway; United Kingdom; France; Poland; Denmark; Greenland; Iceland; Faroe Islands
1941—1945; Germany; Quisling regime (from 1942); Finland (until 1944) (Note: During Finlands time as an ally of Germany, Finland did military actions against the USSR alone and did not fight against resistance forces in Norway and Denmark.); Naval support: Italy (1942) (Note: Italian participation was limited to the four motor torpedo boats of the XII Squadriglia MAS serving in the international Naval Detachment K on Lake Ladoga during the summer and autumn of 1942.)	1941—1945; Soviet Union; Norway; Norwegian resistance; Danish forces; Sirius Dog Sled Patrol; Danish resistance; Danish Brigade in Sweden; United Kingdom; Iceland (until 1941); Faroe Islands; Poland; United States; Greenland; Iceland (1941–1944); Finland (from 1944)

The Scandinavian theatre of World War II encompasses the military and political events that took place between late 1939 and May 1945 in Scandinavia (including territories culturally associated with it, such as Finland, Greenland, Iceland, and the Faroe Islands), within the broader context of the European theatre of World War II.

Scandinavia was involved early in the events of the Second World War: in late November 1939, Finland was invaded by Soviet troops, intent on annexing strategic border areas, and signed the Moscow Peace Treaty, by which it had to cede about 10% of its territory after a conflict lasting just over three months. As a result, Finland aligned itself with Nazi Germany, and in June 1941 participated in the invasion of the USSR, opening a new front stretching from Lapland to the Gulf of Finland. Cooperation between Germans and Finns continued until September 1944, when the government in Helsinki capitulated in the face of renewed Soviet counteroffensives; Finnish and Soviet troops then cooperated in the Lapland War to expel the last German units from Lapland.

Denmark and Norway were invaded by Germany in April 1940 during the events of the so-called "Operation Weserübung": the Danes capitulated quickly, while the Norwegians resisted longer, also thanks to the support of an Anglo-French expeditionary force, but ultimately surrendered in early June 1940.

Denmark was initially treated leniently, subjected to Germany but still retaining some internal autonomy; however, growing opposition from institutions and the populace to the oppressive policies imposed by Germany led, in August 1943, to the dissolution of the government and full German military occupation. In Norway, the Germans installed a puppet state led by Vidkun Quisling, but due to his lack of support, the country was fully subjected to Germany, being established as a Reichskommissariat.

In both Norway and Denmark, various armed resistance groups formed in opposition to the German occupiers and local collaborators.

Sweden played an ambivalent role: the country, formally neutral and uninvolved in the conflict throughout its duration, on one hand supported Finland’s struggle against the USSR and maintained intense trade with Nazi Germany; on the other hand, particularly after 1943, it provided refuge and assistance to Danish and Norwegian resistance groups and the regular armed forces established by their respective governments-in-exile, as well as supporting the populations of occupied countries with humanitarian interventions.

== Background ==
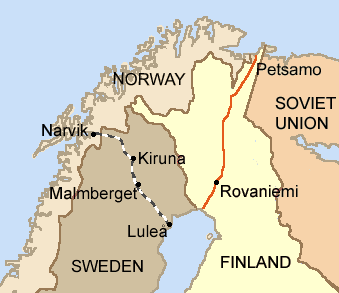
Iron ore was extracted in Kiruna and Malmberget, and transported by rail to the ports of Luleå and Narvik (borders as of 1920–1940)

Scandinavia, geographically comprising Sweden, Norway, and Finland, was united by strong historical ties with Denmark (which, except for Greenland, is part of continental Europe). Together with Sweden, Denmark controlled the Øresund strait, the gateway to the Baltic Sea, and was thus a key hub for Northern Europe’s economy, although the Germany built the Kiel Canal in 1895 and expanded it in 1914, allowing rapid passage between the North Sea and the Baltic.

Sweden was a major producer of iron ore (essential for Germany’s industrial, civilian, and military power policies), which was exported through the Norwegian port of Narvik and two Swedish ports, unusable year-round due to ice, while Narvik, thanks to the Gulf Stream, remained accessible.

At the outbreak of World War II, the British, on the initiative of Winston Churchill, planned to send three battleships to disrupt traffic between Swedish and German ports in what was to be Operation Catherine, but the plan was abandoned due to other priorities for materials needed to convert the ships and a shortage of skilled labor.

== Soviet Union and Finland ==
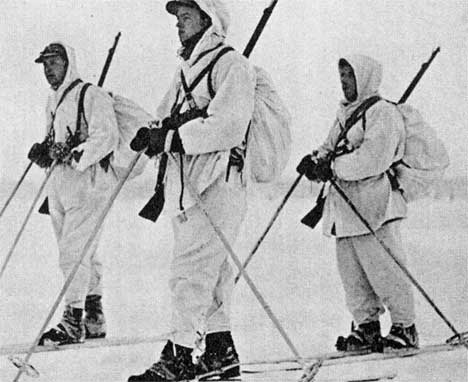
Norwegian volunteers on the Finnish front during the Winter War

Toward the end of 1939, the Soviet Union requested territorial adjustments from Finland to improve the defense of Leningrad. It proposed a 30-year lease of the Hanko Peninsula, which, together with positions on the Estonian coast at Paldiski, would block access to the Leningrad Bay for hostile ships; it also demanded the withdrawal of the border in Karelia to place Leningrad beyond the range of heavy artillery and control of Petsamo, Finland’s only port on the White Sea and a potential threat to the Soviet port of Murmansk.

In exchange, the Soviet government offered some border areas. However, as Finland refused, the USSR opted for a violent resolution of the dispute; this casus belli was deemed pretextual by world public opinion, which sided with the Scandinavian country. At the time operations began (30 November 1939), World War II had already started three months earlier with the German invasion of Poland and the subsequent declarations of war by France and the United Kingdom against Germany. By late 1939, the forces of the two sides faced each other along the fortified Maginot Line and Siegfried Line in what was called the “Phoney War” due to its static nature and lack of fighting, while the Soviet Union had annexed the Baltic republics of Estonia, Latvia, and Lithuania through a forcibly imposed treaty.

Attention thus focused on the so-called Winter War: aid and volunteers willing to fight for Finland arrived from around the world, without distinction between democratic countries and those under totalitarian regimes, such as fascist Italy and the Kingdom of Hungary, with a significant presence of Scandinavians. The volunteers numbered 11,500, including 8,275 Swedes, 725 Norwegians, 800 Danes, 400 Hungarians, and 300 Americans of Finnish origin. The state that provided the most material aid to Finland was France: 145 aircraft, 500 artillery pieces, 5,000 machine guns, 200,000 grenades, 400,000 rifles, and twenty million rounds of ammunition.

== German blitzkrieg ==
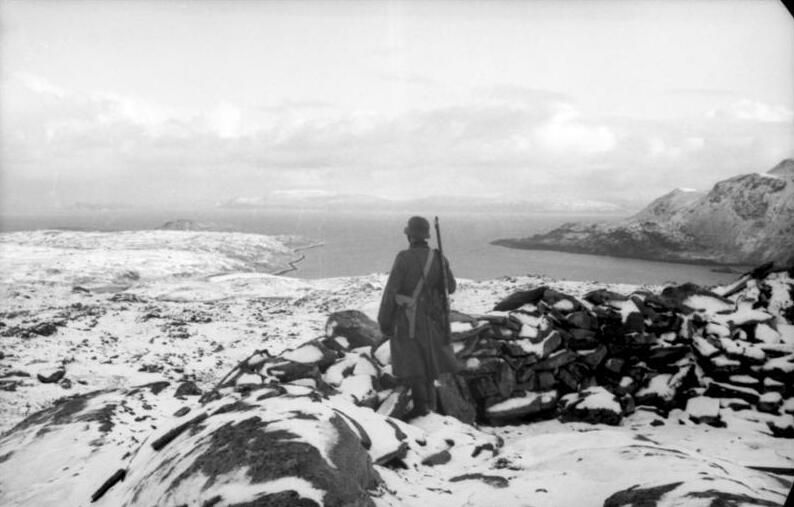
A lone German sentinel at a coastal guard post in Lapland in 1943

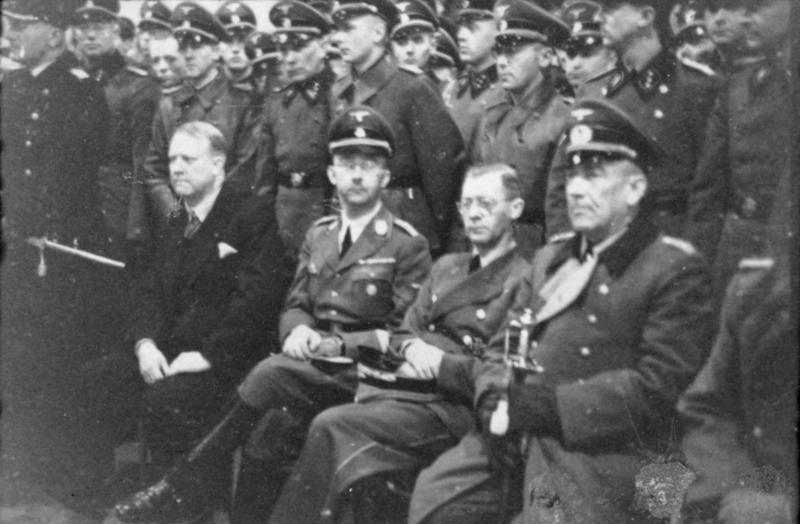
Vidkun Quisling, Heinrich Himmler, Reichskommissar Josef Terboven, Generaloberst Nikolaus von Falkenhorst, commander of the occupation forces (seated), and officers of the Waffen-SS, Wehrmacht, and Luftwaffe in a 1941 photo

With the invasion of Norway, the Germans aimed to prevent what had been the main problem for their navy during the First World War, namely the imposition of a naval blockade line from Scotland to Bergen by the Royal Navy, made possible by Norway’s pro-British foreign policy. The possibility of a German attack on Norway had been theorized as early as 1929 in the book La strategia navale della prima guerra mondiale by German Admiral Wegener. However, in 1939, Hitler had told Admiral Erich Raeder, commander of the Kriegsmarine, that the war would not begin before 1944, and the German naval construction program was planned accordingly. The Bismarck-class battleships were not yet in service, and the German fleet was unable to confront the British fleet in open waters.

Nevertheless, Norwegian bases would be more useful than German ones for the U-boats, and Raeder, in October and December 1939, urged Hitler to plan the occupation of Norway, meeting initial resistance. Nazi theorist Alfred Rosenberg introduced his Norwegian protégé Vidkun Quisling to Raeder, who provided Hitler with new arguments for the invasion, but despite the OKW having already prepared the necessary plans, it was only the Altmark incident that finally led to the decision to undertake Operation Weserübung.

The Allies, through Churchill, also anticipated a German attack in the north, so much so that in a note dated 16 December 1939, he advocated “a major offensive war,” which would likely have prompted the Germans to invade Scandinavia; later, he stated: “We have more to gain than to lose from a German attack on Norway and Sweden.” The French prime minister, Édouard Daladier, expected to use the Altmark incident as a pretext to immediately occupy Norwegian ports “[...] with a sudden attack; it will be all the easier to justify this move in the eyes of public opinion the faster it is completed and the more our propaganda can exploit the memory of Norway’s recent complicity in the incident.”

On the other hand, the Winter War between the Soviet Union and Finland was already underway in the region, with both the Germans and the Allies as secondary players. At that time, the Germans were bound to the Soviets by the Molotov–Ribbentrop Pact, and they ensured strict neutrality and control over arms supplies to the Finns, despite having supported the growth of their armed forces in the past. The Allies, meanwhile, were attempting to deliver weapons and aid to the Finns through an expeditionary force that was nominally composed of “volunteers.” The Norwegian campaign of 1940 placed Denmark and Norway in the hands of the Reich, and these countries remained occupied until Germany’s surrender in 1945.

The Danish armed forces were utterly inadequate to defend the country, which was also vulnerable due to its flat terrain and lack of natural obstacles. The few army and navy aircraft were outdated and suited only for reconnaissance tasks; the navy, with 4,300 personnel, equipped only with a coastal defense ship with 150 mm guns, six torpedo boats, and seven submarines, was in no way capable of stopping the German squadron that arrived in Copenhagen on 9 April 1940. The Danish naval air force, with its eleven seaplanes in Copenhagen, two others with the naval squadron in Aarhus, two more in Slipshavn, and nine land-based aircraft at the Avnø naval base, was supposed to oppose the hundreds of aircraft deployed by the Luftwaffe.

The two German infantry divisions assigned to the operation encountered only weak and symbolic resistance, also because the Danish government had not declared general mobilization. The ships of the Maersk Line, then A.P. Møller-Mærsk Gruppen, were placed under the management of the company’s New York office, and under Special Standing Order One, no order from Denmark could be accepted unless countersigned by the New York office led by Arnold Mærsk Mc-Kinney Møller. Ships outside Danish waters were placed under Allied control; some were sunk by German submarines during the conflict, such as the Leise Maersk, sunk on 23 November 1940.

Denmark formally remained under its own sovereignty, with its elected parliament and King Christian X of Denmark on the throne. However, Iceland was occupied by the British in the Operation Fork, which slightly preceded the similar German Operation Ikarus. The British occupation force was replaced by an American one in 1941. Subsequently, Iceland broke away from the personal union that tied it to Denmark with a vote by the Althing; on 9 April 1941, the Danish ambassador Henrik Kauffmann signed, without government authorization, an agreement with the United States authorizing the presence of American troops in Greenland, making it de facto American.

In Norway, in addition to the collaborationist government of Quisling, the Germans appointed a Reichskommissar in the person of Josef Terboven, while the occupation forces, initially consisting of a few tens of thousands of soldiers, later increased to 350,000 by 1945 following British attacks and commando raids (e.g., operations Claymore, Anklet, Gauntlet, as well as the subsequent Fritham and Musketoon). In German plans, Norway was intended to serve as a base for air and naval operations to prevent the Kriegsmarine from being bottled up in the Baltic and North Sea, as well as an excellent starting point for long-range reconnaissance aircraft like the Focke-Wulf Fw 200.

== Norway ==
=== Norwegian armed forces in exile ===
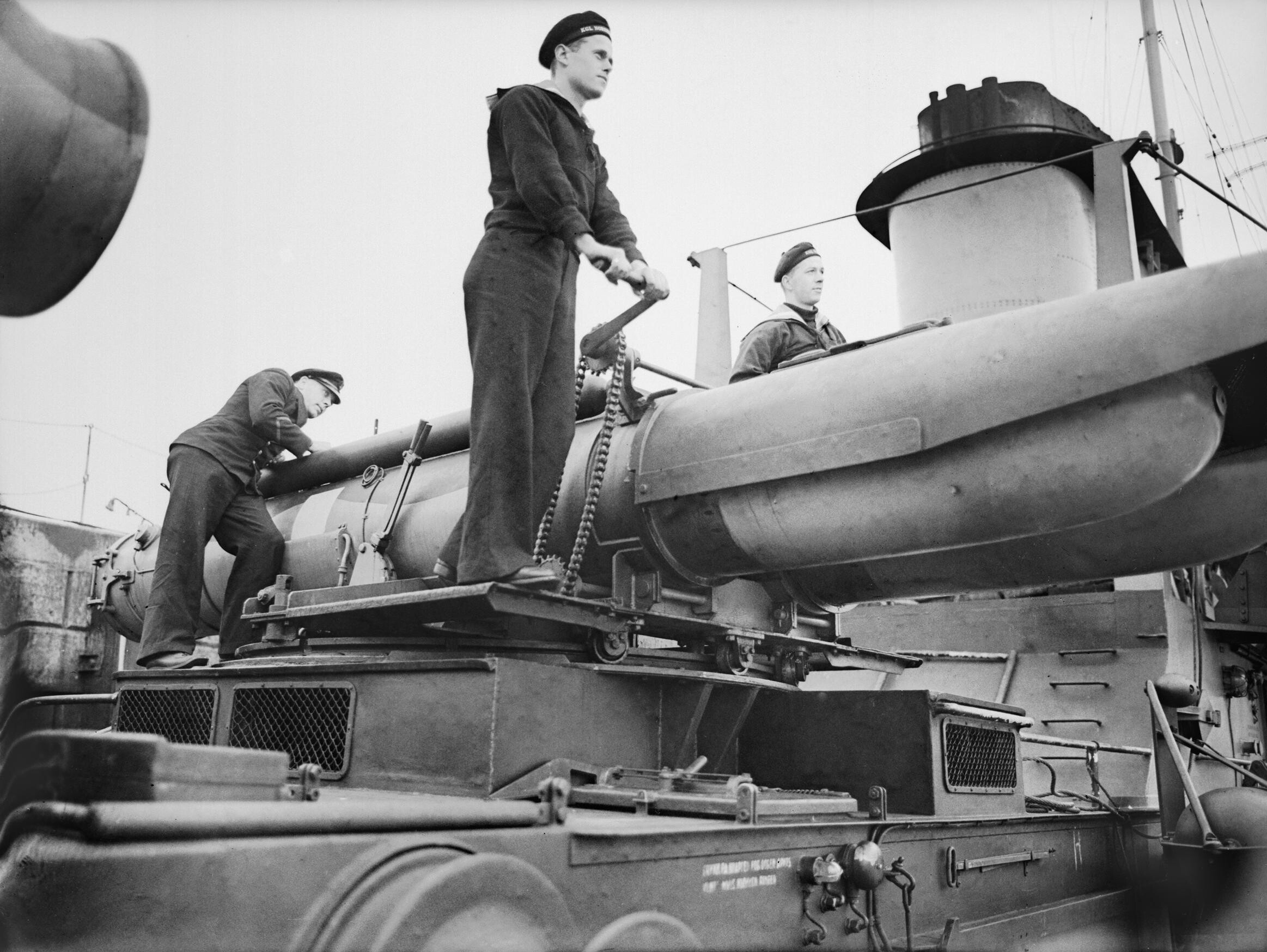
Sailors at the torpedo tubes of KNM Sleipner, a Norwegian destroyer operating from Britain during the conflict

While the Allies focused their operations in the far north and the Germans strengthened their positions, various degrees of resistance to the occupiers emerged in the occupied countries. The Norwegians actively collaborated with the SOE (Special Operations Executive, the British special operations service), providing local contacts, intelligence, and personnel ready to infiltrate under the auspices of the Norwegian government-in-exile; ground, air, and naval forces were also established in British territory.

The United Kingdom assigned several ships to the new Norwegian navy, which retained the name Kongelige Norske Sjøforsvaret, as only minor vessels (thirteen obsolete craft with 500 men) had managed to escape capture at the time of surrender. By the end of the war, 58 warships were operating with the Allies under the Norwegian flag, largely funded by the Nortraship, and 118 throughout the conflict. These ships primarily served as escorts for convoys during the Battle of the Atlantic and various military operations, such as the Normandy landings. Only two merchant ships were used and lost in Norwegian waters during a raid on the Svalbard islands (Operation Fritham).

A special unit established under the SOE was the Norwegian Naval Independent Unit (NNIU), renamed in October 1943 as the Royal Norwegian Naval Special Unit (RNNSU) but commonly known as the Shetland Bus. Given the need to maintain connections with Norway, the SOE created a group to shuttle between Scotland and the occupied Norwegian coast, transporting weapons and personnel. Initially, ordinary fishing boats undertook arduous and dangerous nighttime journeys amidst German air and naval patrols, but after some failures accompanied by losses, the unit received three fast submarine chasers of American construction. Named Vigra, Hessa, and Hitra, they enabled operations to continue without further losses. A significant figure in the unit was Leif Andreas Larsen, a Norwegian navy officer known as "Shetlands Larsen," who carried out 52 liaison operations and was decorated multiple times by both the British and the Norwegians; another notable figure was Kåre Iversen, who made 57 trips as an engineer.

The Norwegian brigade formed in Scotland saw little action and was confined to garrison duties, in addition to training other Allied troops in winter warfare. However, special units, including the distinguished Kompani Linge and the No. 5 Troop of the No. 10 (Inter-Allied) Commando with mixed Anglo-Norwegian personnel, were employed in various raids along the Norwegian coast, often bringing back additional volunteers who enlisted in the Allied forces. A unit was sent to Jan Mayen island, where it operated a weather station, evacuated by the Norwegians in 1940, from March 1941 to June 1946. In Iceland, at a winter warfare school, Norwegian personnel trained 1,000 British and 3,000 American troops. After the liberation, the personnel of No. 5 Troop were sent to Sweden in civilian clothes, traveled by train to Norway, and were used as guards for the Royal Palace, with many of its members later incorporated into the new Norwegian Royal Guard.

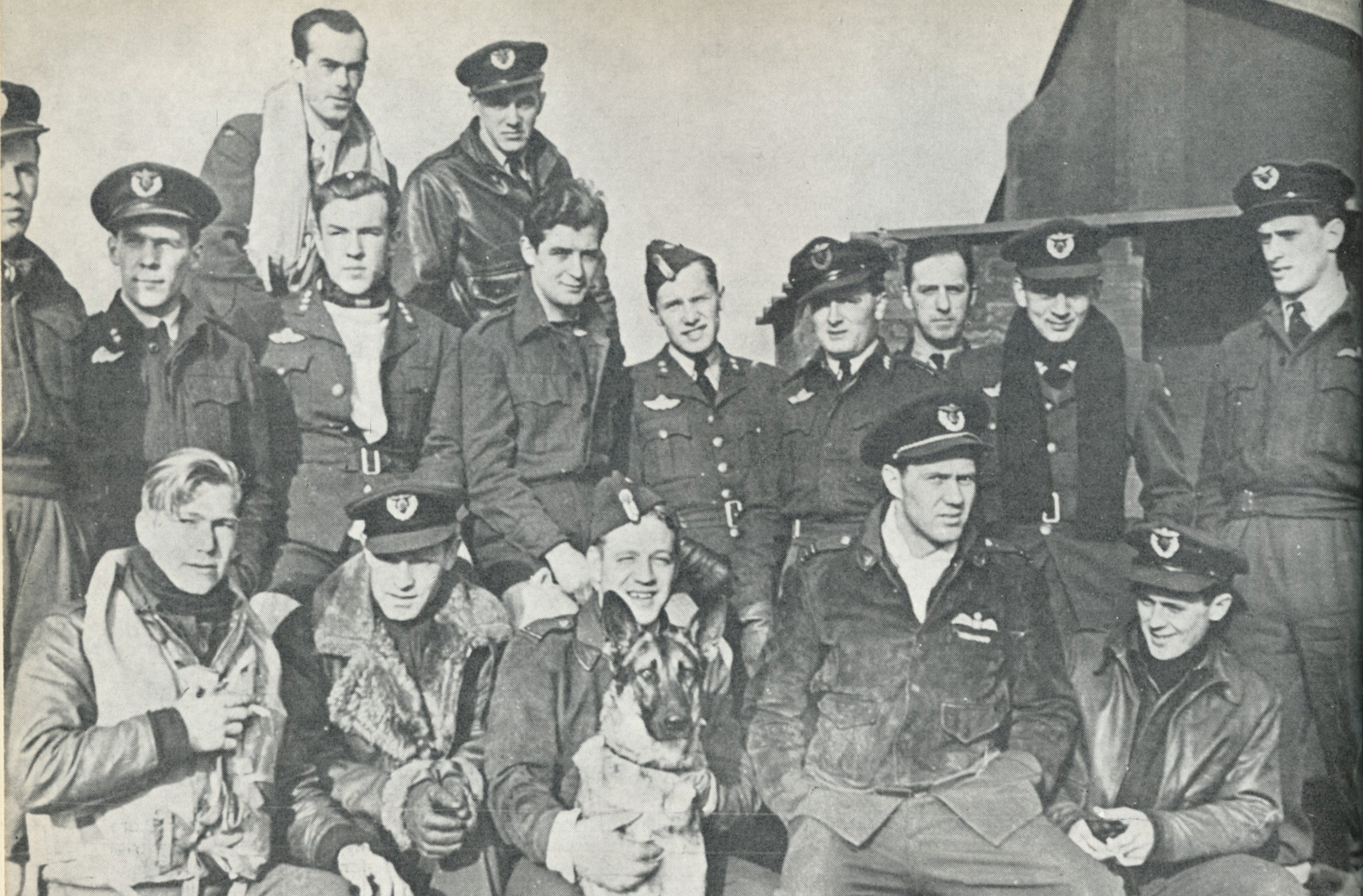
Pilots of the RAF’s 331 Squadron, composed of Norwegian personnel, in 1942; note the mix of British (ranks on shoulder straps) and Norwegian (ranks on collars) uniforms; the Dane Kaj Birksted is second from the right in the bottom row

Among the Norwegian squadrons formed within the Royal Air Force, the 330 (Norwegian) Squadron was stationed in Iceland and performed patrol and anti-submarine defense duties without operating in Norwegian territory; two squadrons of Spitfires (No. 331 (Norwegian) Squadron and No. 332 (Norwegian) Squadron) participated in the air defense of Britain. The 331 Squadron also included the Dane Kaj Birksted, the most famous pilot from that country, who ended the war with the rank of Wing Commander and was a key figure in the postwar reconstitution of the Flyvevåbnet, the Danish air force.

Birksted held the rank of Flyverløjtnant-I (first lieutenant pilot) in the Danish naval air force at the Slipshavn base on 9 April 1940, the date of the German invasion. On the night of 16 April, along with Lieutenant Pilot Charles Sundby, he crossed the Belt by boat to Sweden and from there reached Norway, where he joined the local air force. He then reached England, where he became a pilot of Hawker Hurricanes and participated in the air defense of the country. In July 1942, he shot down his first opponent, in August he was promoted to captain, and on 24 August 1942, he became the commander of the 331st with the rank of major. At the end of the year, he was awarded the Det norske Krigskors med Sværd, the Norwegian War Cross with Sword, by King Haakon. From August 1943, with the rank of Oberstløytnant (lieutenant colonel) and the corresponding RAF rank of Wing Commander, he commanded the 132 (Norwegian) Wing. In 1945, he took command of the RAF Bentwaters Wing at the base of the same name.

Other pilots and crews saw action with the RAF in the Bomber Command and Ferry Command (transporting aircraft from factories to the front). After initial distrust, which led to the arrest and imprisonment of Norwegian resistance members operating in Swedish territory, the Swedes began to change their policy in the summer of 1943. Some Norwegians among the refugees (50,000 throughout the war, though many reached Allied countries) were trained in Swedish camps and formed what was nominally a small police force called Rikspolitiet; later, 13,000 were mobilized to form the Reservepolitiet.

=== Norwegian resistance ===
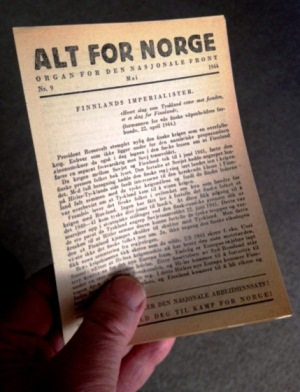
An illegal pamphlet printed by the Norwegian resistance, Alt for Norge, in its 9th issue of 1944

In addition to the military-style organization Milorg, which clashed with the British SOE that demanded a more active role in sabotage against the occupiers, and Norwegian special forces paratroopers deployed for specific operations, other organizations were active in various ways. The XU, where X stands for "unknown" and U for "undercover agent," was an intelligence-gathering network composed of students, academics, professionals, firefighters, and technical personnel distributed across the territory. Initially part of Milorg, its task was to collect information and photographs about the occupiers; it was established by Lauritz Sand, who had worked for British intelligence in India, initially assisted by Major John Hagle and Captain Eivind Hjelle.

Its existence was kept secret until 1980, when some of its members were decorated. Among its leaders were several women, including Anne-Sofie Østvedt, a 22-year-old chemistry student at the University of Oslo. In 1942, the Germans discovered the organization and made a series of arrests, but failed to dismantle it, and its activities continued until the end of the conflict.

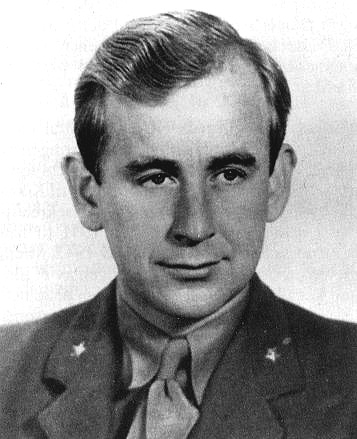
Max Manus in a lieutenant’s uniform, likely during his saboteur training in England

Another resistance organization was the Osvald Group, named after the pseudonym of its founder, Asbjørn Sunde; it originated from the Wollweber League, led by Ernst Wollweber and controlled by the Soviet secret police People’s Commissariat for Internal Affairs. After Wollweber’s arrest in 1941, the group lost contact and funding from Moscow, but Sunde managed to keep the cell operational; after the start of Operation Barbarossa, the group began a sabotage campaign targeting various trains and military installations. It also established its own training camp in Rukkedalen, an isolated mountainous area near Nesbyen. From 1942, it provided military security for the headquarters of the Norwegian Communist Party (NKP), and Sunde became a leader, securing funding for operations. The group carried out over 200 sabotage actions from 1941 to 1944, when it was disbanded on Soviet orders.

The active resistance policy of the group was in contrast with the passive resistance of other movements, which focused mostly on intelligence gathering, and with the directives of the NKP. Unlike the members of XU, those of the Osvald group did not receive decorations in the postwar period due to the changed political climate, and the organization was not recognized. In 1954, he was discovered and sentenced to eight years in prison. In honor of the group’s fallen, a monument was erected in Oslo on 30 May 1995.

A group that had an influence on the Norwegian resistance was Mot Dag, of communist inspiration, which infiltrated the country’s political life through its members (called motdagists) despite not having an official status after 1936. The group began active resistance against the invader after the German attack on the Soviet Union. In October 1941, Ljungberg, the defense minister of the government in exile, was succeeded by Oscar Torp, a member of Mot Dag, and in February 1942, the Forsvarets Overkommando, the defense headquarters, was centered on two Mot Dag members: Vilhelm Hansteen as commander and Bjørn Christopheren as chief of staff.

Other group members participated in active resistance initiatives. Viggo Hansteen and Rolf Wickstrøm were the first Norwegian citizens killed by the Germans, on 10 September 1941: the former was a Supreme Court lawyer who, after the occupation, had fled to London but returned to Norway and fought the Nasjonal Samling’s attempt to control the trade union confederation. He was executed for participating in the Melkestreiken ("milk strike") against food shortages, which mobilized 25,000 workers in Oslo at companies like Spigerverket, Nyland, Skabo, and Kværner. This prompted Reichskommissar Terboven to proclaim martial law. Rolf Wickstrøm was a workers’ union representative at Skabo Jernbanevognfabrikk in Oslo and an activist for workers’ rights.

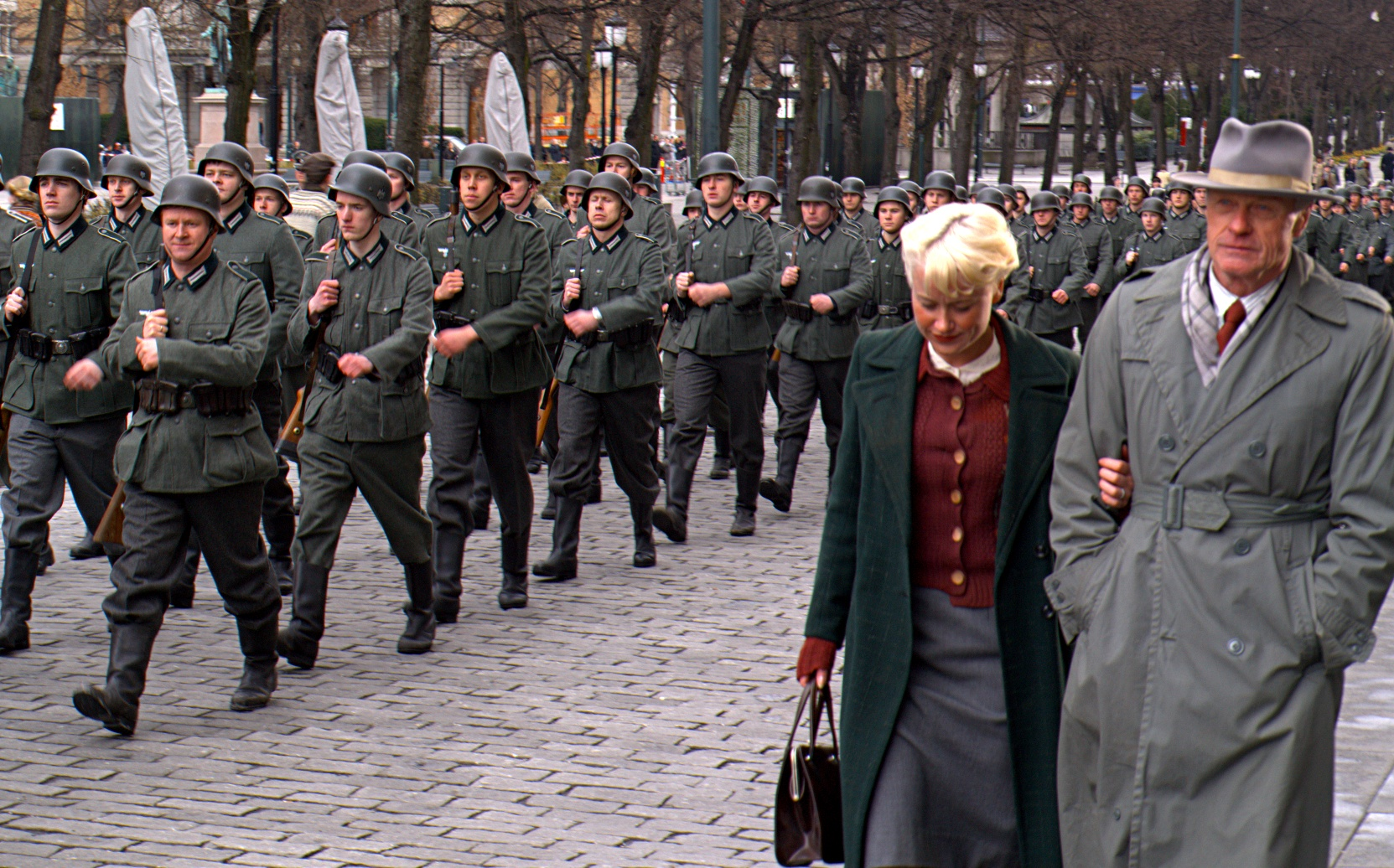
Extras in German uniforms march through Oslo’s streets during the filming of the movie Max Manus

Among the members of Mot Dag were many influential Norwegian politicians, such as Prime Ministers Einar Gerhardsen, who resigned in 1963 due to an environmental disaster in the Svalbard, Oscar Torp, and John Lyng, the father of Gro Harlem Brundtland, and Defense Secretary Gudmund Harlem. Also part of Mot Dag were Haakon Lie, long-time secretary of the Arbeidernes Partei, Oslo mayor Brynjulf Bull, and the German Willy Brandt, future German chancellor. Brandt, whose real name was Herbert Frahm, was at the time a refugee in Norway due to his anti-Nazi activities in Germany, had joined the movement, and obtained Norwegian citizenship under his new name; he was captured during the invasion wearing a Norwegian uniform but was released without being identified and took refuge in Sweden.

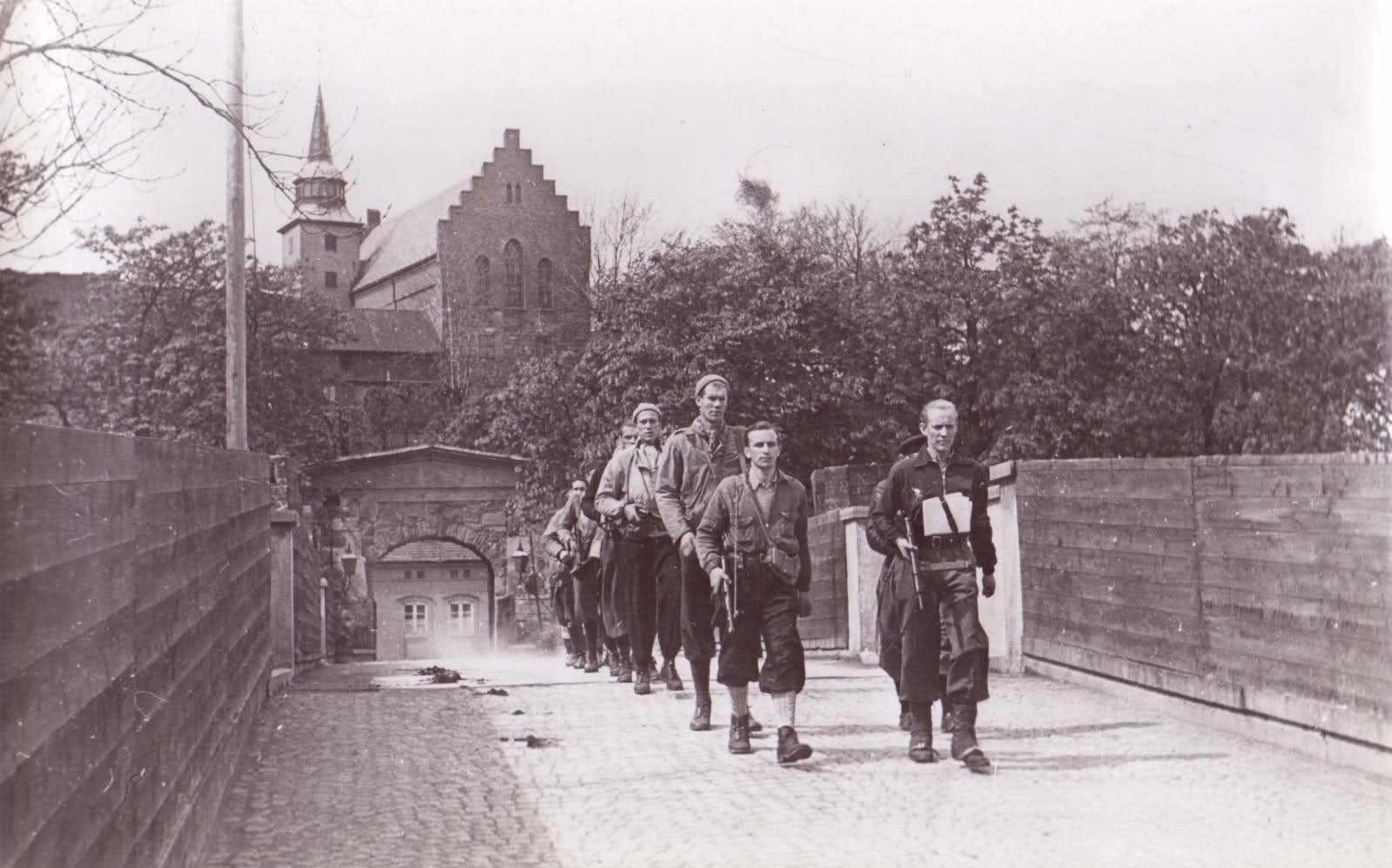
Milorg men march from Akershus Fortress after the German surrender on 11 May 1945

According to some estimates, the resistance numbered about 40,000 people, 15,000 of whom belonged to Milorg.In October 1941, Ljungberg, the defense minister of the government-in-exile, was succeeded by Oscar Torp, a Mot Dag member, and in February 1942, the Forsvarets Overkommando, the defense headquarters, was centered on two Mot Dag members: Vilhelm Hansteen as commander and Bjørn Christopheren as chief of staff. Sønsteby, who was highly decorated after the war, was also a member of the so-called “Oslo group” (Oslogjenge, literally “Oslo gang”) or “Oslo detachment of Kompani Linge,” led by him and Max Manus, active from March 1944 to May 1945 with a series of high-profile sabotage actions against the occupying forces. The group’s operations also targeted administrative structures intended to manage the conscription of 75,000 Norwegians to be sent to the Soviet frontline. In May 1944, the call-up of the 1921, 1922, and 1923 classes for “national labor duty” was issued. To prevent this, the group destroyed the cataloging and sorting machinery on 18 May 1944 and 17 June 1944 and devastated the registry office at Akersgaten 55 in Oslo. In 2008, the exploits of the Oslogjenge were depicted in the film Max Manus.

Another key figure for Milorg was Jens Christian Hauge, later a Labour politician and administrator of various companies, including Noratom A/S, which continued Norsk Hydro’s work in the nuclear energy sector: during the war, he was a member of the Oslo police price control unit. Frogmen under Manus’s command sank the German ship Donau in Oslo with explosive charges, which was carrying 450 vehicles, artillery, horses, and troops, as well as the Monte Rosa, used to deport Norwegian Jews to Germany and, on its return, troops and supplies. Another operation was carried out in February 1945, when eleven tugs and a rescue ship were taken from the Oslo fjord and repaired in Sweden, which disrupted German traffic on the eastern side of the fjord for weeks.

=== British operations ===
The British conducted numerous commando operations and air or naval raids, primarily in northern Norway. Among the special forces operations, the most significant was a series aimed at destroying Norwegian heavy water production facilities and halting their activity, culminating in the Telemark raid. Other significant attacks included Operation Claymore, during which, on 4 March 1941, a squadron of British destroyers escorted two troop transports to the Lofoten Islands, which were temporarily occupied. All fish oil production facilities were destroyed, and 18,000 tons of German shipping were sunk. The operation met little resistance, and several hundred Norwegian volunteers were transported to Britain, where many joined the Norwegian forces in exile.

This was followed by Operation Gauntlet, conducted between 25 August and 3 September 1941, when a Canadian commando unit occupied Spitsbergen island in the Svalbard archipelago, destroying mines, coal, and oil supplies; they evacuated 2,000 Soviet workers to Arkhangelsk along with all removable equipment, while eight captured ships were transferred to Britain. During the return journey, the German gunnery training ship Bremse was spotted and sunk by the light cruiser HMS Nigeria, which was itself damaged, likely by a mine.

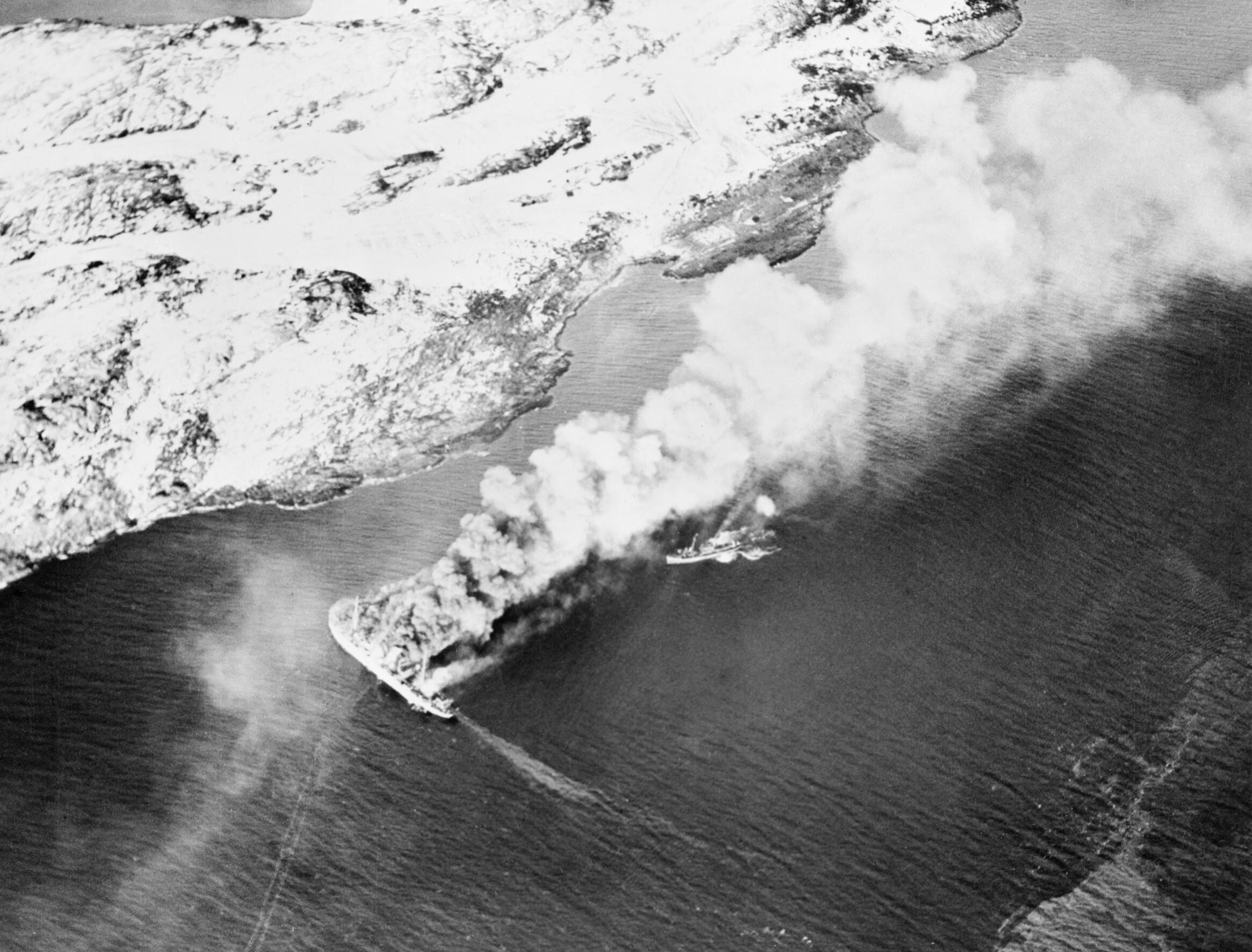
The German prison ships Rigel and Korsnes burning after an RAF air attack on 27 November 1944

Several air harassment operations against coastal traffic were conducted from Scotland with squadrons of Bristol Beaufighter and de Havilland Mosquito torpedo bombers. Squadrons 144, 404 (Beaufighter), and 235, 248, and 333 (Mosquito) of the Coastal Command operated from bases in Banff and Dallachy. The 333 Squadron was formed in Leuchars on 10 May 1943 from No. 1477 Flight (composed of Norwegian personnel) and, after moving to Woodhaven, conducted numerous reconnaissance and supply-dropping missions for the Norwegian resistance. A second Flight, initially equipped with Catalinas for patrols, arrived at Banff and switched to Mosquitoes, participating in attack operations.

The strike group thus formed conducted numerous attacks, alone or with Beaufighters, in large formations of up to forty aircraft, sinking several ships along the coast, including the Sulldorf —VP 1608, an anti-aircraft vessel of 264 tons (14 September 1944), the Lynx of 1,367 tons, and the Tybifjord of 3,080 tons (19 September), and the Vangsnes and Hygia at Lister (21 September). Attacks continued until the war’s end, when, on 2 May, the minesweeper M.293 of 637 tons and the U-2359 of 234 tons were sunk in the Kattegat. On 4 May, the last operation of the war took place, conducted by a force of 41 Mosquitoes and 19 escorting Mustangs, targeting a convoy of three merchant ships, a minesweeper, a requisitioned Danish gunboat, and two auxiliary units; the merchant ship Wolfgang L. M. Russ of 3,750 tons was sunk, while the other two (Gunther Russ and the Danish Angamos) were damaged. The attack was carried out at such a low altitude that one Mosquito returned to base with a German flag and a piece of mast entangled in its nose. During the operation, four aircraft were shot down, and reports indicated that all ships were hit or set ablaze.

Aircraft from the Fleet Air Arm conducted several attacks from aircraft carriers off the coast. On 27 November 1944, aircraft from HMS Implacable (R86) attacked the ships Rigel and Korsnes, carrying prisoners of war (mostly Soviet and Yugoslav) near Tjøtta, Helgeland: of the 2,721 aboard the Rigel, only 415 survived, though numbers vary by source, and its captain managed to beach it in flames at Rosøya; on the Korsnes, hit less severely, there were six deaths.

The Royal Navy primarily escorted Arctic convoys and hunted German surface units, but its submarines were used to disrupt German coastal traffic, including ships transporting Swedish iron ore from the port of Narvik to Germany. This resource was vital to the Third Reich’s war economy, as Swedish iron ore accounted for 40% of Germany’s needs, without which certain production levels could not have been maintained; thus, transport ships became the primary target of Allied forces.

== Denmark ==
=== Occupation ===
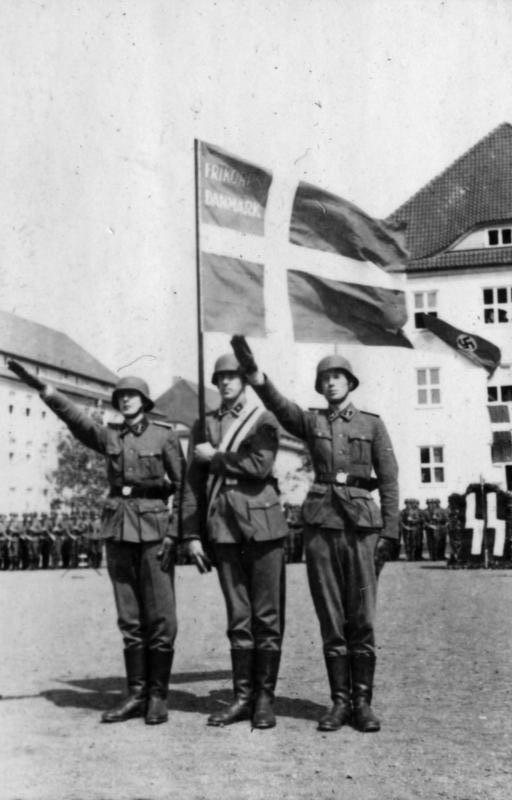
Oath-taking ceremony of the Danish SS volunteers of the Frikorps Danmark, 1941

The Danes initially adopted a more cautious stance, but many, either residing abroad or having fled Denmark, enlisted in the Allied forces. On the other hand, seven joined the Luftwaffe, while many more enlisted in the Waffen-SS of the Frikorps Denmark, which later merged into the Standarten Nordland. An explicit order from Hitler prohibited Danish volunteers from joining the German armed forces, but the pilots initially admitted wrote letters of complaint to Goering and were reinstated.

While the Danish air forces remained grounded (considering it would have been extremely easy for an aircraft to cross the Øresund by flight and seek safety in Sweden), the army and navy remained partially operational. The navy was tasked with minesweeping in the strait in an east-west direction to allow internal traffic, while the Germans swept the south-north direction, enabling the Danes to claim to the Allies that the fleet was not collaborating with the Germans.

Danish minesweepers operated tirelessly in maintaining the minefields that Denmark itself had laid before the war, with only one unit lost, the minesweeper K1. However, in February 1941, the Germans requisitioned the six new 290-ton torpedo boats Dragen, Hvalen, Laxen, Glenten, Hoegen, and Ørnen with the promise of providing materials to build new ones; the ships were disarmed before delivery.

=== Resistance ===
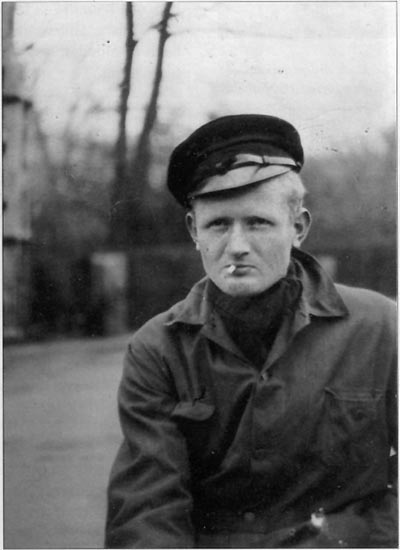
Bent Faurschou-Hviid (1921-1944), known as "Flammen" (Flame)

Several resistance groups also emerged, the most important of which included the Aagaard group, AMPA, BOPA, Churchill Club, Holger Danske (named after a Danish national hero), and the Hvidsten group. The first group, Ram, formed on 9 April 1940. Lacking the means to conduct military actions, they chose to fight the Danish Nazi party through propaganda, disrupting its meetings and publishing the names of its members.

The exploits of the two leaders of Holger Danske, Bent Faurschou-Hviid and Jørgen Haagen Schmith, are depicted in the 2008 film Flammen & Citronen (The Flame and the Lemon, from their code names). Two Gestapo infiltrations led to the arrest and execution of 64 members, but the internal connections were relatively loose, so those arrested could only reveal a limited number of their comrades' identities.

The Hvidsten group, named after a tavern in Jutland, served as a distribution center for weapons received secretly and destined for other groups. It suffered a heavy blow when, following revelations under torture by a British agent, eight of its members were captured on 11 March 1944 and 26 June 1944, and executed on 29 June.

The Aagaard gruppen was formed in March 1945 in the locality of the same name near Kolding; it consisted of 18 people and was led by Jens Kristian Jensen. It received weapons from the British (estimated to include hundreds of carbines, about a hundred hand grenades, 100 kilograms of explosives, and several bazookas) and was able to sabotage roads in Jutland used by the Germans to transport troops to Norway. The group also published underground newspapers and maintained radio contact with the British SOE, remaining active until liberation. During one of the supply drops, three members were identified and arrested by the Gestapo, but they were released at the end of hostilities.

The BOPA (Borgerlige Partisaner, bourgeois partisans) were a group inspired by a pre-existing communist formation, the KOPA (Kommunistiske Partisaner, communist partisans), composed of veterans of the Spanish Civil War and organized in cells that became active only after the invasion of the Soviet Union. Due to the scarcity of available weapons, they initially limited themselves to attacks with Molotov cocktails. The name of the formation derives from an incident where some students, previously rejected for being considered "elitist," set fire to an electronics equipment factory in Hellerup, the Dansk Industri Syndikat. Due to the success of the attack, they were admitted and, as a joke, began calling themselves BOPA, in contrast to the original acronym; over time, this became the group's best-known name, which carried out further attacks on companies supplying the Germans, such as Burmeister & Wain (shipbuilding and engines) and Dansk Riffel Syndikat (a mechanical construction company co-owned by the A.P. Møller-Mærsk Gruppen and manufacturer of automatic weapons under the name Madsen) in 1943, again at Riffelsyndikatet and then at Global in 1944, and at Always in 1945. Due to the damage sustained, production at Riffelsyndikatet did not resume until the end of the war, despite the company's president, A.P. Møller, stating in 1943 to the newspaper Politiken that these sabotages were contrary to Danish interests, suggesting a prompt restoration. One of the last and most significant attacks was on the German cruiser Nürnberg, near the end of the war.

'Denmark Fights for Freedom', a film about the Danish resistance in 1944

A significant portion of the population supported the resistance movement, despite the government's official stance of passive resistance. Although not active members, many doctors (for example, Dr. Jorgen Kieler for Holger Danske) treated partisans and provided logistical support to Jews when the Germans attempted to begin deportations. Illegal publications flourished, such as De Frie Danske (The Free Dane) and Land og Folk (Land and People), the latter of communist affiliation. On 22 June 1941, with the invasion of the USSR, the Danish Communist Party was outlawed, and students immediately protested, clashing with the police.

Having established contacts with Britain, a Danish section of the British SOE was set up, and Dr. Carl Johan Brun trained some Danes in parachute use. He was killed in a drop over Copenhagen; his deputy, Mogens Hammer, who had parachuted with him, took over. With a change in SOE leadership in the spring of 1942, the resistance was supplied with weapons and explosives to undertake sabotage operations, while Allied aircrews were instructed to seek out the nearest Danish doctor in case of being shot down, demonstrating the widespread support and loyalty of the profession to the resistance.

Even among the Germans, there were sympathizers with the movement, such as naval officer Duckwitz, who provided a Danish politician with various information regarding anti-Jewish raids. Admiral Wedel's decision to scuttle the fleet, contrary to government orders, deprived the Germans of patrol vessels essential for controlling the vast coastline, making it difficult to counter both the escape of Jews and clandestine communications with Sweden.

On 26 September, the head of the Danish SOE, Christian Rothbol, was killed by the police; on the same day, Hitler sent a long birthday telegram to King Christian X, who responded simply with "Spreche mein besten Danke aus" ("Many thanks"), provoking the dictator's fury. However, it was only with the increasing number of attacks, which reached 200 in August 1943, and the destruction by the head of Holger Danske, Tom Syndergaard, of a hall intended for German troops that Germany decided to force the Danish government to make a choice, explicitly demanding the execution of saboteurs. Following the refusal and a general strike, the country went from "collaborating" to fully occupied.

=== Armed forces ===
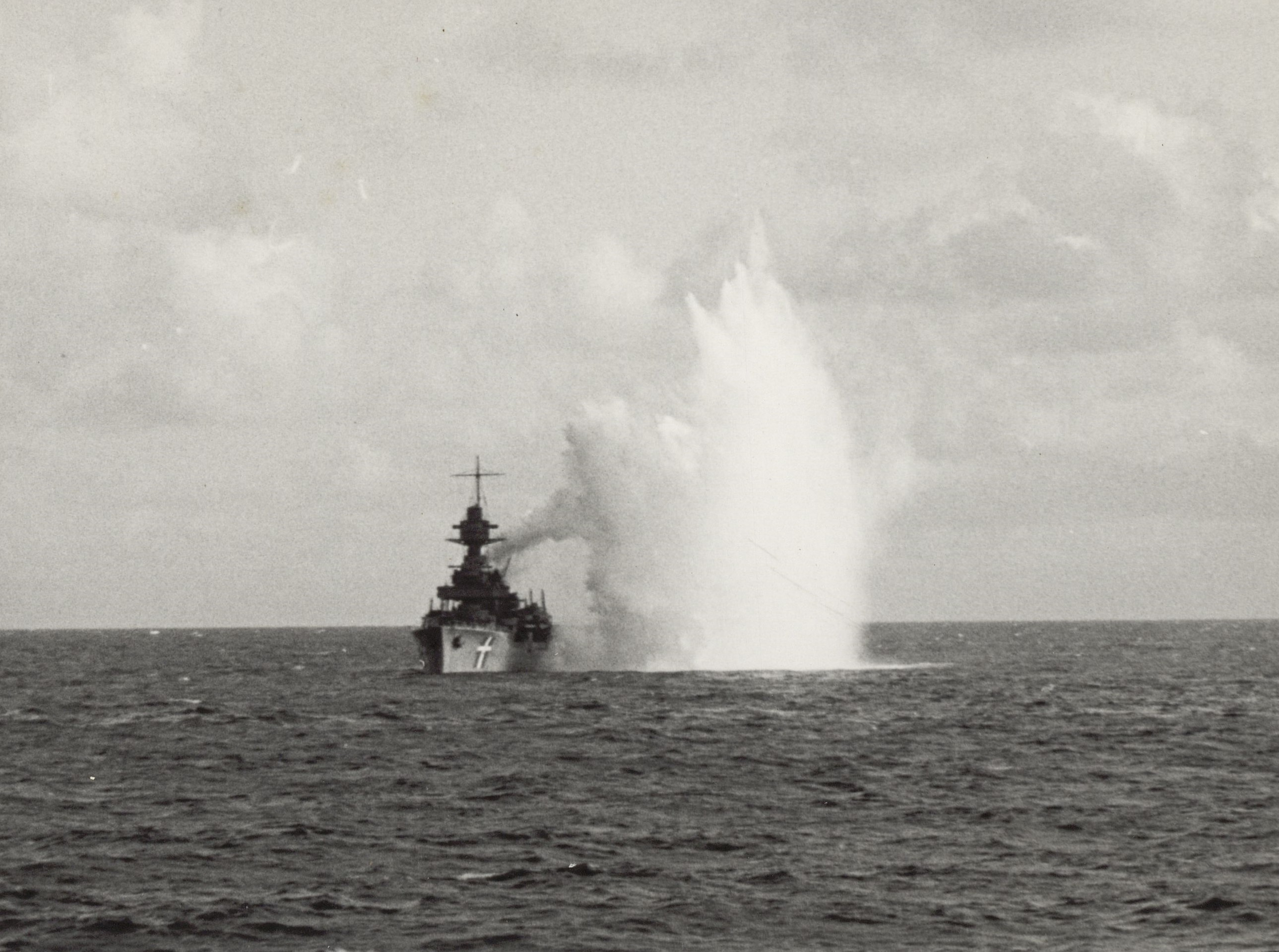
The coastal defense ship Niels Juel under attack by German bombers

The growing tensions within Denmark toward the occupiers and the war's developments led the Germans, on 29 August 1943, to proceed with the disarmament of the fleet and army; anticipating this, unable to resist with force, the Danish navy had ordered its ships to attempt to reach Sweden or scuttle themselves. During the escape, the hangar housing seaplanes at the Holmen military base in Copenhagen was set on fire.

However, only a few smaller units reached Sweden. The largest suffered the near-explosion of two bombs that irreparably damaged the electrical system and other systems; due to the ship's outdated design, which offered no protection against air attacks, Commander Westermann, also a member of Parliament, decided to run it aground, and the crew sabotaged all systems and threw the ammunition overboard. Most ships chose to scuttle themselves, such as the coastal battleship Peder Skram at Holmen, obsolete and long relegated to training or reserve duties; the Germans managed to seize only some minesweepers and smaller units, which were immediately integrated into the Kriegsmarine.

Following these events, Sweden began to revise its stance, allowing the formation of a Danish brigade, known as Danforce but officially named Den Danske Brigade: officially composed of Polititropper (literally "police troops"), it was, in reality, a fully-fledged military force with four light infantry battalions and one heavy battalion, mortars, engineers, and services, supported by a naval flotilla based in Karlskrona consisting of the Danish ships that had escaped and a small air unit in Såtenäs. In total, the unit had about 4,800 personnel, including women. The Danish brigade returned to Denmark only at the end of the conflict to assist in the disarmament of German troops present in the country.

At the end of the war, those who had fought with other nations were not warmly welcomed; Kai Birksted, among the first to land at Kastrup Airport (Copenhagen) after the German surrender, was still considered a lieutenant in the reserve for the Flyvevåbnet and only in this capacity contributed to the postwar reconstitution of the new independent Danish air force. Of the seven officers who had joined the Luftwaffe, three died in combat; one, Terp, became a political refugee in the United States, where he enlisted in the USAF; two others, Anker and Sommer, were dishonorably discharged from service under a law of 1 July 1945, with Sommer also sentenced to 12 years in prison, despite the Danish Ministry of Defense having approved their enlistment. Of the seventh, Lieutenant Peter Horn, who had fought in the Ilmavoimat Finnish air force during the Winter War, it is only known that he was accepted into the Luftwaffe, served on the Eastern Front, where he achieved 10 or 11 victories with the 1./JG51 (first squadron of the 51st fighter group), and was decorated with the Eisernes Kreuz 2. Klasse and the Eisernes Kreuz 1. Klasse.

=== Liberation ===
With the approaching collapse of the Third Reich, the last German military operations were severely limited by a shortage of resources. In January 1945, the light cruiser Nürnberg, faced with a series of minelaying missions in the Skagerrak to be conducted alongside minelayers and destroyers, could only carry out one, named Operation Titus, after the minefield Minensperre Nr.39 - Titus I. due to insufficient fuel. During the minelaying, the ships were attacked by Halifax bombers of the RAF’s 58th Squadron on 13 and 14 January. With only 270 tons of synthetic fuel, the Nürnberg remained in Copenhagen until the end of the conflict, where, on 27 January 1945, it defended itself with its anti-aircraft weapons against an attack by Danish partisans.

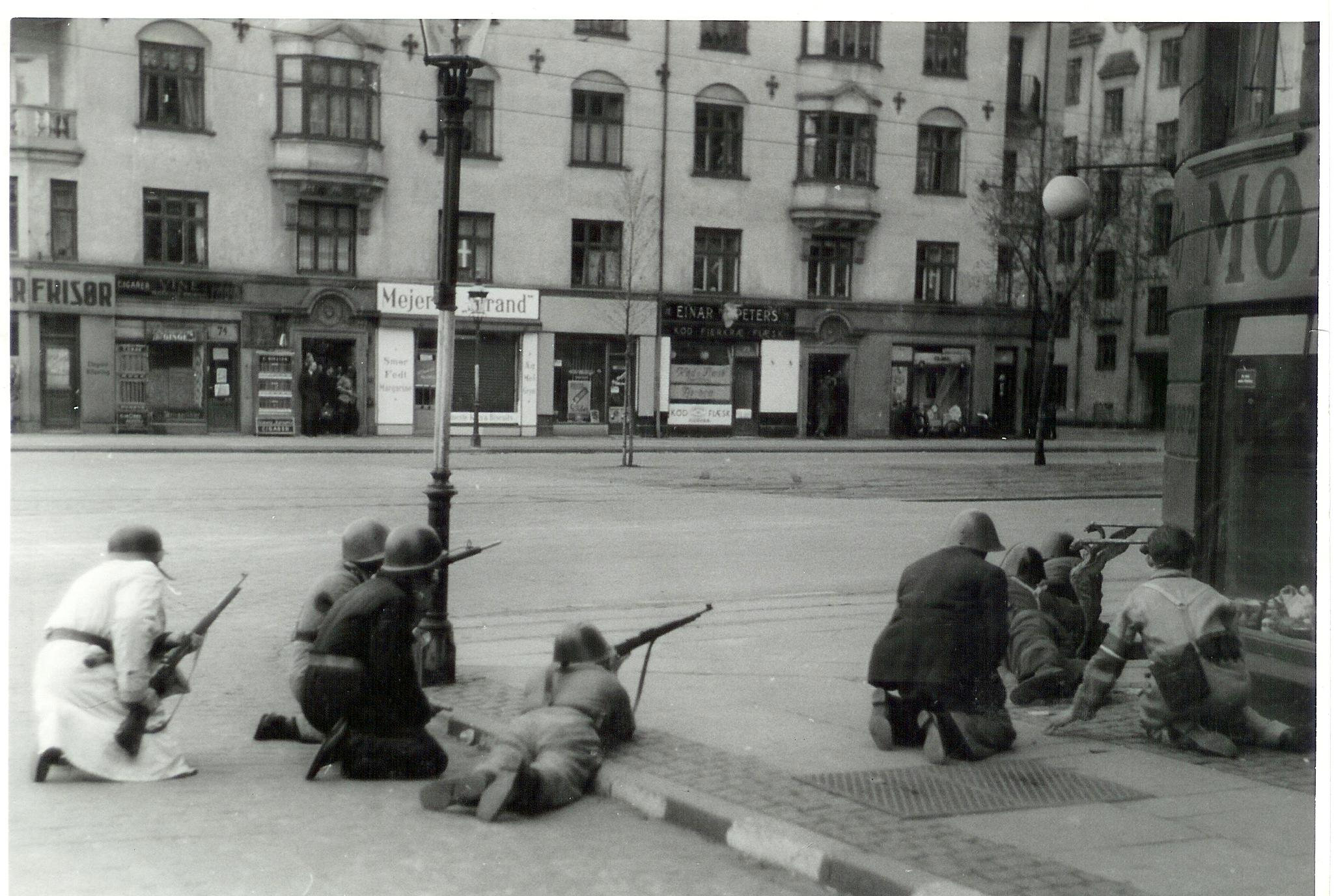
Resistance fighters on the streets of Copenhagen on 5 May 1945

In what was called Operation Eclipse, Allied forces advanced toward Denmark and northern Germany. They occupied Denmark with the support of a flotilla centered on two cruisers, Dido and Birmingham, which entered Copenhagen’s port on 4 May 1945, covering the operations of a minesweeper flotilla, as the Øresund was heavily mined; they were joined by paratrooper units and a squadron of Hawker Typhoon fighter-bombers from the RAF. On 9 May, General Lathbury landed in Copenhagen to coordinate the surrender of German troops. As part of the operation, some British units were deployed toward German research facilities in German territory, as Swedish intelligence sources had warned that the Red Army would advance beyond the territorial demarcation line established by the Yalta agreements. Therefore, during its advance, the 3rd Parachute Brigade, supported by tanks from the Scots Guards, at one point occupied the city of Wismar, in the area assigned to the Soviets, and also confronted the Soviet 3rd Guards Armored Corps, withdrawing after a few days within the established limits.

According to some not easily verifiable reports, at the end of the war, Sweden intended to liberate Denmark before a possible occupation by the Red Army, in what was to be Operation Rädda Danmark ("Save Denmark"). Against a force of 28,000 Germans, supported by a substantial naval squadron (the heavy cruiser Prinz Eugen, the light cruiser Nürnberg, various minelayers, and other light units), the Swedish general staff devised a plan involving the landing of 60,000 men, primarily on the coasts of the island of Zealand, and a smaller amphibious operation on the island of Bornholm. The expeditionary force would have included 6,000 motorized vehicles and a support fleet of over 1,100 ships and small vessels. Among the troops would have been included the approximately 5,000 men of the Danske Brigade. The Swedish air force was redeployed south to support the operation. During planning, the general staff realized it could not intervene simultaneously in Norway and thus limited itself to Denmark. The operation was also intended to mitigate the effect on international public opinion of Sweden’s neutrality and proceeded despite lukewarm domestic support. The intervention option was vaguely communicated to Admiral Karl Dönitz by the Swedish prime minister and discussed in a German meeting with the Reichskommissars of Norway and Denmark; the landing was scheduled for 18 May 1945 but proved unnecessary due to the German capitulation.

Despite the surrender of German forces in Denmark, the military commander of the island of Bornholm, an important transit point for refugees from the Baltic coast fleeing the Soviets, delayed formal surrender, attempting to surrender to the British rather than the Soviets. Soviet aircraft bombed the island on 7 and 8 May, causing extensive damage to the towns of Rønne and Nexø, until the capitulation; Soviet forces then occupied the island for the eleven months following the end of the war. Near Bornholm lies the island of Rügen, which was used as a testing ground for German nuclear experiments and was occupied by the Allies in pursuit of test results, a practice followed for other test sites as well.

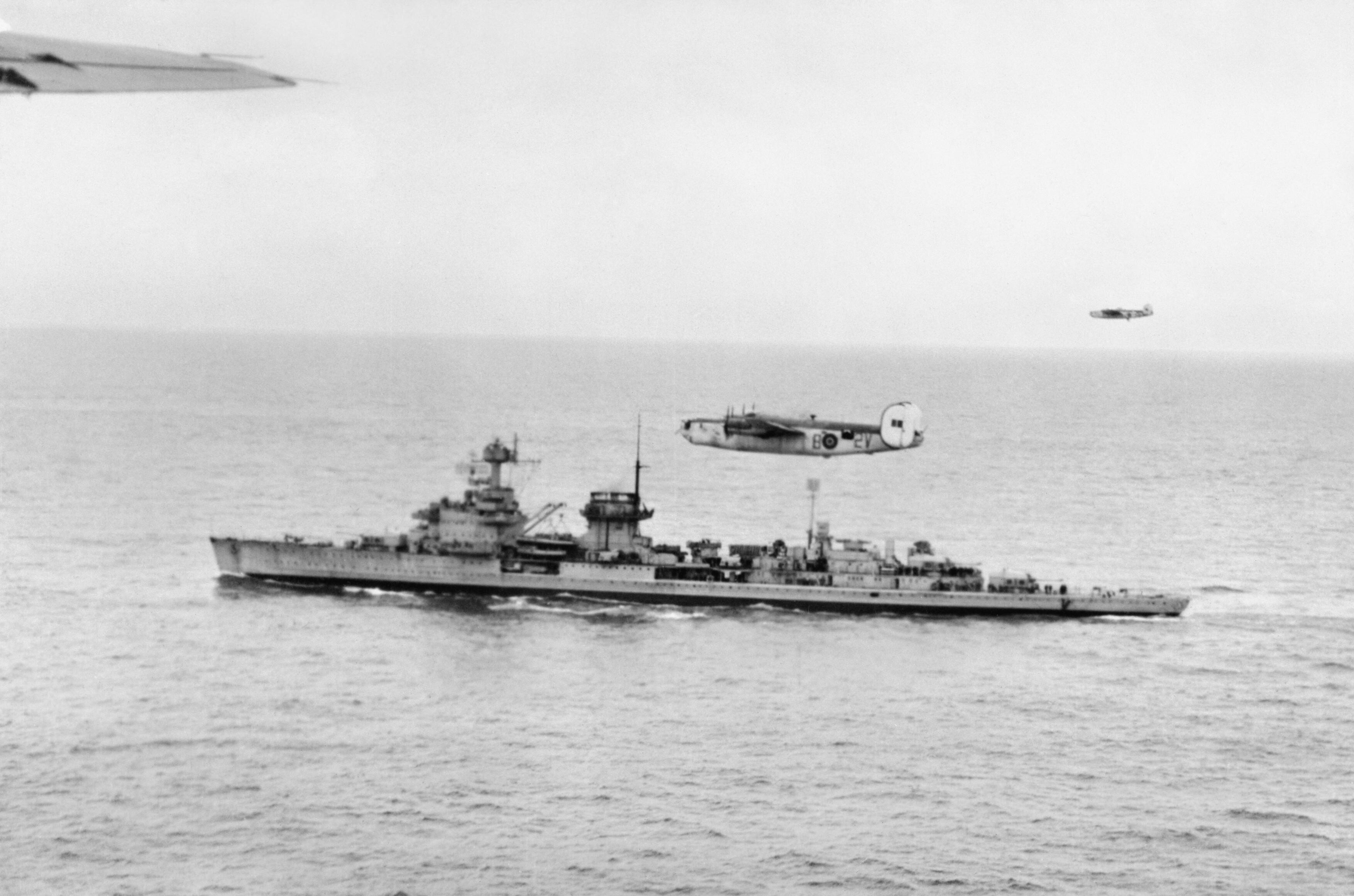
Two B-24 Liberator aircraft of Coastal Command, No. 547 Squadron RAF, escort the Nürnberg after the surrender to Wilhelmshaven

After the surrender, Danish divers conducted a minesweeping operation to secure the cruiser Nürnberg, under which a Danish resistance explosive charge had been placed, but its detonation mechanism had failed; initially, the German commander thought it was an attack and threatened to cut the diver’s air hose, but once informed, he offered one of his men for joint work, and the charge was removed without issues.

Despite the failure, the attack caused a significant stir in Denmark, and the BOPA resistance movement gave it considerable prominence during the press conference held ten days after the surrender, on 15 May, at the Otto Mønsted Building in Copenhagen. The Jyllands-Posten also reported on it. In reality, an earlier attempt to destroy the cruiser had been made by mining a tunnel under its previous mooring point, and the device exploded with minimal damage to the ship, which was supposed to be heavily damaged by the collapse of nearby cranes; however, the cranes did not fall.

=== Greenland and Faroe Islands ===
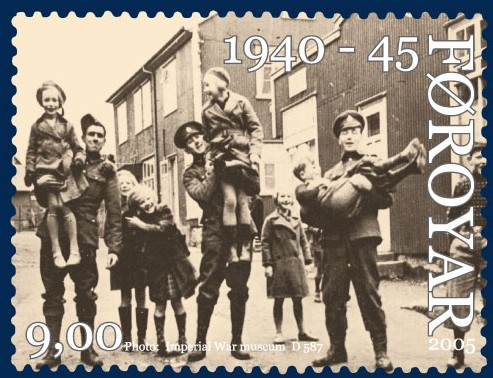
Faroe Islands stamp from 2005 commemorating friendly relations between the local population and British forces during the war

Greenland, a Danish territory, was initially declared independent from Denmark in 1940 by its governor Eske Brun, who, on 9 April 1941, signed an agreement with the United States that effectively made it a protectorate. The Germans attempted to establish weather stations there, but the personnel were captured by a local patrol force, known as the Sledge Patrol, in 1943. The island remained under U.S. control throughout the conflict.

The Faroe Islands were also a county (amt) of Denmark, and on 12 April 1940, following the German occupation of the mainland, they were occupied by British troops; the British left the local parliament, the Løgting, in charge, also granting it local legislative powers previously exercised by the Danish parliament; the Danish prefect, Carl Aage Hilbert, also retained his position. The goal was to prevent the Germans from using the islands as a base for submarines engaged in the Battle of the Atlantic; between 1942 and 1943, the Royal Engineers of the British Army built the only airport in the archipelago on the island of Vágar, as a base for anti-submarine aircraft; they also erected defensive works and coastal batteries. The islands’ fishing fleet ensured a supply of fish to Britain, which was under food rationing, throughout the conflict. The initial garrison of 250 Royal Marines was later replaced by the Lovat Scouts, a Scottish reconnaissance unit, and then by the Cameronians (Scottish Rifles), a Scottish rifle unit; from 1944, with the diminishing threat, the garrison was significantly reduced. The islands suffered several Luftwaffe attacks, but no invasion attempts occurred during the hostilities.

== Finland ==
Finland operated extensively in the same theaters as the Winter War, but this time with significant German support and a small Italian contribution, which materialized in the deployment of the XII Squadriglia MAS on Lake Ladoga to participate in the blockade of Soviet supplies destined for Leningrad. Far more substantial were the German contributions in arms, and in the far north, two German army corps were active: the XXXVI Army Corps and the Gebirgs ArmeeKorps Norwegen, the latter an alpine unit based on two Austrian divisions and commanded by General Eduard Dietl, who died in a plane crash on 23 June 1944. Its objective was the capture of Murmansk (Operation Silver Fox), but despite initial progress, the Germans were halted 50 kilometers from the city.

During the war, the Finns did not persecute Jews, except in some specific cases, and provided asylum to approximately 500 foreign Jews, contrary to German directives. Finnish Jews fought in both the Winter War and the Continuation War, which the Jewish community regarded as a struggle for national independence. A field synagogue was also active, viewed with indifference by the Germans, and Finnish Jewish soldiers were protected by their superiors from any German interference or demands, as they were considered "no different from other Finns." Finnish Jewish doctors treated German soldiers, and Jewish soldiers received German decorations for valor in combat, which they refused. As the military situation deteriorated and a change of sides became imminent, in 1944, the refugees were transferred to Sweden.

== Baltic Sea ==
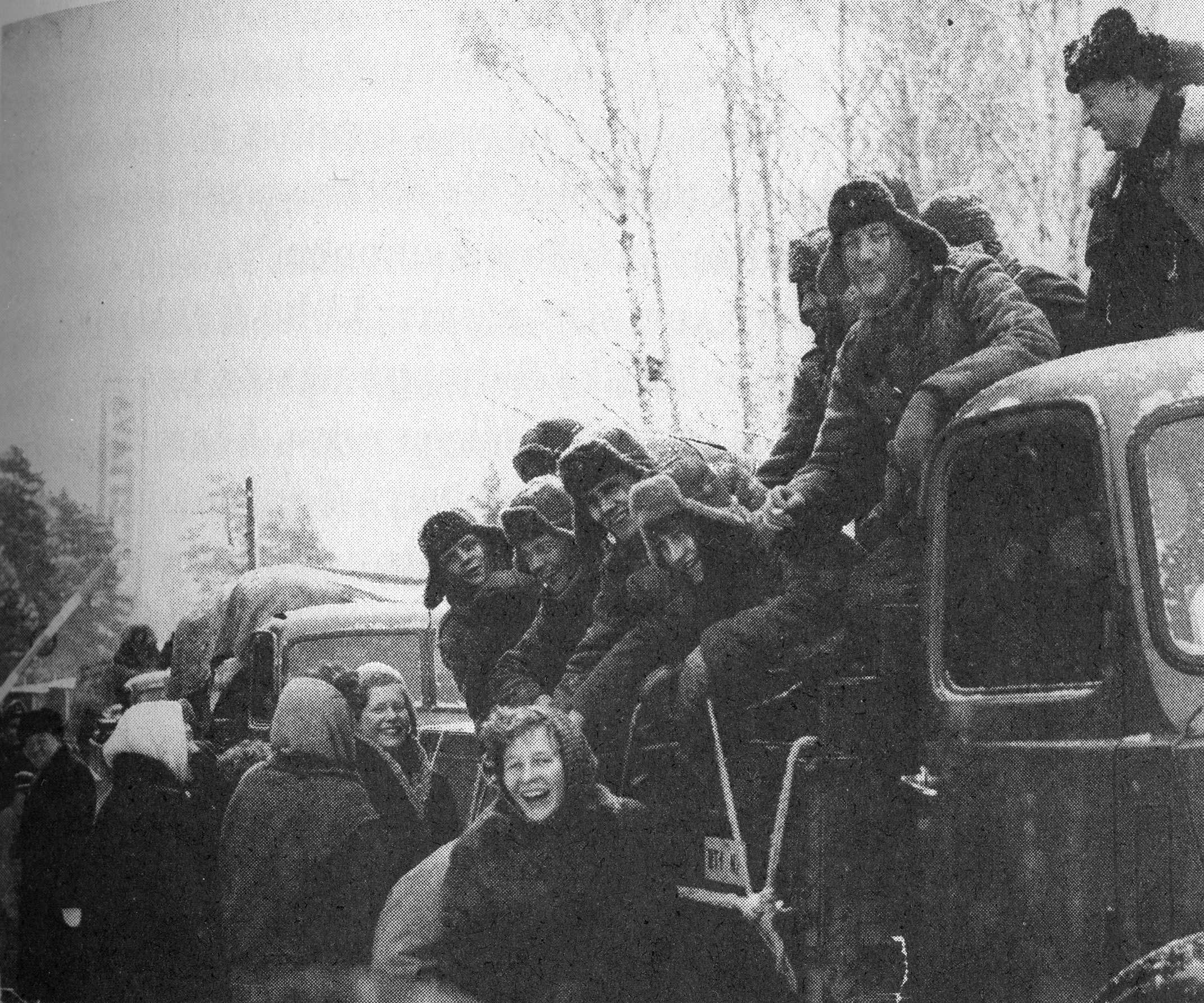
On 26 January 1956, with the return of Porkkala, Finnish troops and evacuees return to the area

The Gulf of Bothnia was under the surveillance of the Swedish and Finnish navies; the latter had laid a large minefield at the Åland Islands, partially closing its entrance. Since the gulf was the route for ships transporting iron to Germany from the port of Luleå at 65°39' N, cargo ships were often escorted by Swedish destroyers to protect them from attacks, despite flying the Swedish flag: for example, this happened to the Ada Gorton in 1942.

The gulf was also used by German transports, such as the Isar, which ferried army troops to the northern front and the Kola Peninsula through the port of Tornio at 65°55' N; alpine units of the Gebirgsjäger-Regiment-137 were deployed from late August to early September 1941 in missions never officially acknowledged and with orders always given only by telephone. Other missions involved hunting Soviet submarines attempting to infiltrate the gulf, although the numerous Swedish destroyers lacked sonar systems. During the winter months, the Baltic was navigable only with the aid of icebreakers; for example, in March 1942, a Swedish icebreaker opened a route between Sassnitz (Germany) and Trelleborg (Sweden). Several ships, such as the Finnish Argo and the Danish Orion, were torpedoed south of the Åland Islands; traces of Soviet torpedoes were found, and the first action was attributed to the submarine SC-317.

The Gulf of Finland was heavily mined (60,000 mines laid, two-thirds by the Germans and the rest equally by Soviets and Finns), requiring extensive postwar clearance assigned by the Allies to Finland. This required the Merivoimat, which at the end of hostilities had five minesweeper flotillas, only one capable of sweeping influence mines, to mobilize 200 units and convert non-specialized vessels for the purpose. To make matters worse, the Soviets requisitioned most of the larger tugs, and to partially compensate, between 1945 and 1946, 12 minesweeper vessels of the Kuha class were ordered. Already in 1944, the Finnish navy had cleared routes necessary for the Soviet navy to attack Germany by sea, removing 700 mines in 40 days. In the following years, until 1948, 35,000 km^{2} of sea were cleared, detecting and destroying over 9,000 mines at the cost of 28 deaths and 37 injuries, with 10 vessels sunk and several others damaged.

Finland had to demobilize its army after expelling German forces from its territory, and in the postwar period, in addition to territorial concessions, it had to lease the Porkkala peninsula to the USSR for 50 years: besides controlling access to the port of Leningrad, the peninsula placed the capital Helsinki within range of Soviet artillery. Following the reduced effectiveness of artillery in favor of missiles, the Soviet government significantly shortened the occupation and returned the peninsula on 26 January 1956. During the lease period, Finnish trains could cross the area only under Soviet control, with darkened windows and a ban on photography.

== Economic repercussions ==
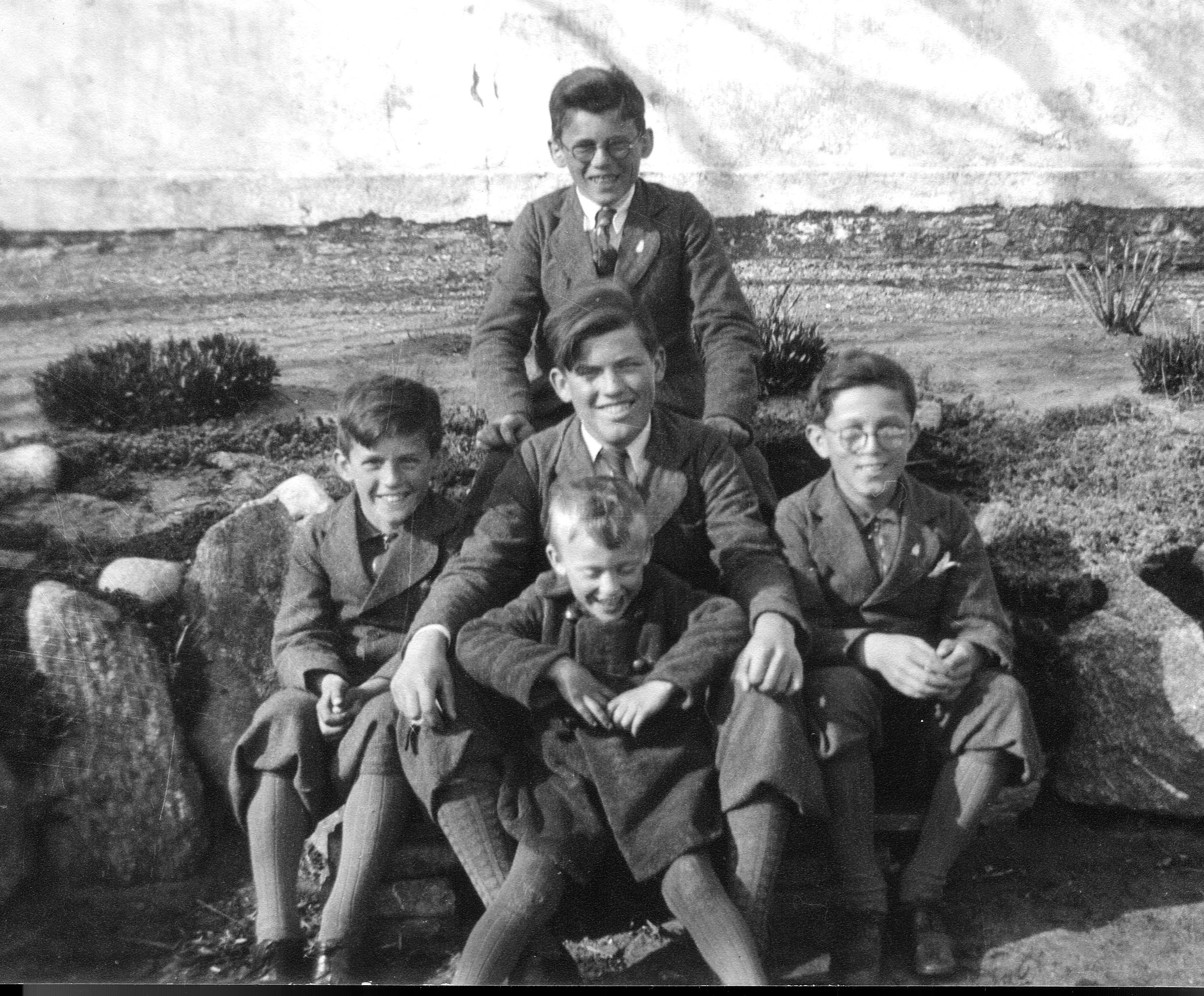
A photo of the Lebeck Group, young Danish resistance fighters

Throughout the conflict, Denmark served as a source of food supplies for Germany, which stationed a small occupation force there that interfered little with daily life; the limited military presence was also due to the flat terrain, which was not conducive to armed resistance activities. Nevertheless, social tensions arose due to the formation of a local Nazi party, the DNSAP, which never had more than three representatives in the Folketing; it garnered 1.8% of the vote in 1939 (31,000 voters) and 2.1% in 1943 (21,000 voters). The party supported Germany but was not placed in power, given the Danes’ cooperation.

In Norway, the Nazi party, led by Vidkun Quisling, came to power. Norway was a source of mineral supplies, but its large merchant fleet remained mostly abroad and provided significant support to the Allies. To manage such a large number of vessels, in April 1940, the Norwegian Shipping and Trade Mission (Nortraship) was established in London, managing about 1,000 ships and becoming the world’s largest shipping company.

Sweden was generally pro-Allied, but a Nazi party, the Nationalsocialistiska Blocket, emerged there, aligned with the upper classes; it was joined by two larger ones, SNSP and NSAP, which gained some traction. The country constantly faced the threat of a German attack and had no escape routes, being surrounded by Axis-aligned or occupied nations.

Pre-war iron suppliers to Germany’s economy in 1939
Source	Tons (millions)
Germany (including annexed parts)	8.9
Sweden	6.2
Others	4
Total	15

However, for an extended period, the Swedes maintained an interested neutrality, trading iron and armaments with Germany. Iron passed through Swedish and Norwegian ports and was also transported on Swedish ships escorted by the Svenska marinen through the Baltic. While the Royal Navy extensively attacked maritime traffic from Norway to Germany, the Soviet navy did the same, sometimes targeting Swedish ships; several tragic events occurred, such as the sinking of the Swedish passenger ship Hansa by the Soviet submarine L21 on 23 November 1944 (84 dead, only two survivors), a prelude to the subsequent sinkings of the Wilhelm Gustloff, Cap Arcona, and General von Steuben, which resulted in thousands of deaths among refugees and prisoners of war they were carrying.

Sweden continued selling iron ore until the end of the war in progressively decreasing quantities; it also sold war materials or components, such as ball bearings. Some Swedish weapons, like the Bofors 40/60 (40 mm caliber with a barrel 60 times the caliber), were exported or produced under license. The Bofors gun was adopted as the main anti-aircraft gun on ships of Germany (producing the 40 mm FlaK 28 L/56 version) and Japan on one side, and the United Kingdom, Canada, Australia, Poland, and the United States on the other.

== Social repercussions ==
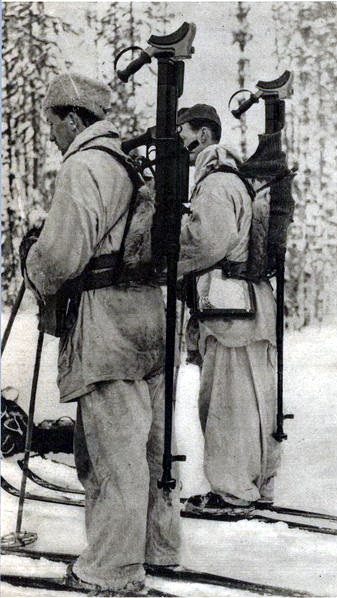
Swedish volunteers during the Winter War with anti-tank rifles Boys

Relations between Sweden and Norway were complex and non-linear. They had been united until 1905; Sweden never recognized the legitimacy of the Quisling regime and did not close the diplomatic missions of occupied countries with governments in exile (Norway, Netherlands, Belgium, and Luxembourg). The Swedish foreign minister continued addressing correspondence to "The Royal Norwegian Government - London," but after the death of the Norwegian ambassador in Sweden, Wollebæk, in October 1940, the accreditation of a new ambassador was refused.

Until 1941, 30% of Norwegians attempting to seek refuge in Sweden were turned back, but despite an order from Terboven mandating the death penalty for defectors, the Germans did not kill anyone for reasons other than flight; after 1941, the Swedes became more lenient toward those seeking refuge in Sweden. The treatment of Norwegian sailors on ships caught in Sweden by the German invasion was different: after a legal dispute, these were handed over to the Germans with their crews, and 277 people ended up in prison camps, where 43 died.

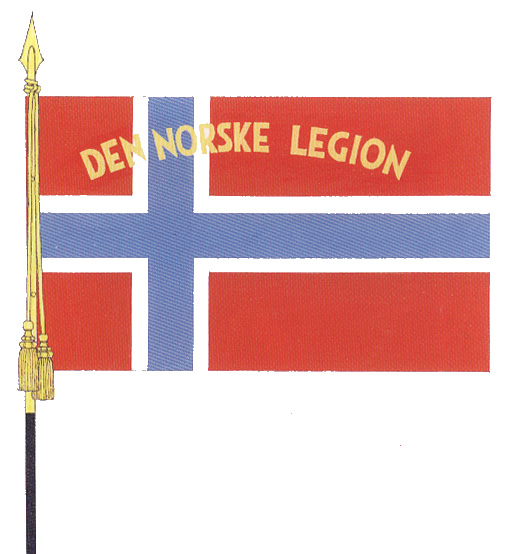
Standard of the Den Norske Legion

In Norway, a Nazi party existed, and some Norwegian citizens enlisted in the SS as part of the Den Norske Legion. As in other occupied countries, the Lebensborn project was implemented, and after the end of hostilities, this affected Norwegian women who had associated with German soldiers: they were called tyskertøser (literally "German whores") and 14,000 of them were interned in camps like Hovedøya, while some were deported to Germany. Their children were labeled tyskerunger ("German kids") or worse, naziyngel ("Nazi spawn"), and those brought back to Norway after the war often ended up in orphanages. Norwegian criminologist Kjersti Ericsson described the reprisals against women who had children with Germans as "the cultural path that made women’s sexuality a national property"; this led to proceedings at the European Court of Human Rights, which concluded only in 2007 with compensation for the discriminated.

After the war, during what was called the legal purge in Norway (Det norske landssvikoppgjøret), numerous trials were held against Norwegians or foreigners deemed guilty of war crimes. Police forces (such as the Milorg or the brigade trained in Sweden) arrested 28,750 people, also to prevent their lynching. Many were released relatively quickly, but in August 1946, between 5,000 and 6,000 people were still detained; according to one author, there is no record of extrajudicial punishment, except for women who had lived with Germans, more for offending public sensibility than for committing actual crimes: these were often shaved and publicly humiliated.

Finally, about 200 were convicted (particularly for membership in the Nasjonal Samling), of whom 30 were sentenced to death, reintroduced through the decree known as Landssvikanordning; 25 of them were executed. As with the internments of women associated with Germans and their children, the effectiveness, legitimacy, and cruelty of these measures have been and remain sources of heated debate within Norwegian public opinion. The Norwegian population employed various passive resistance techniques, such as leaving seats next to Germans empty on buses.

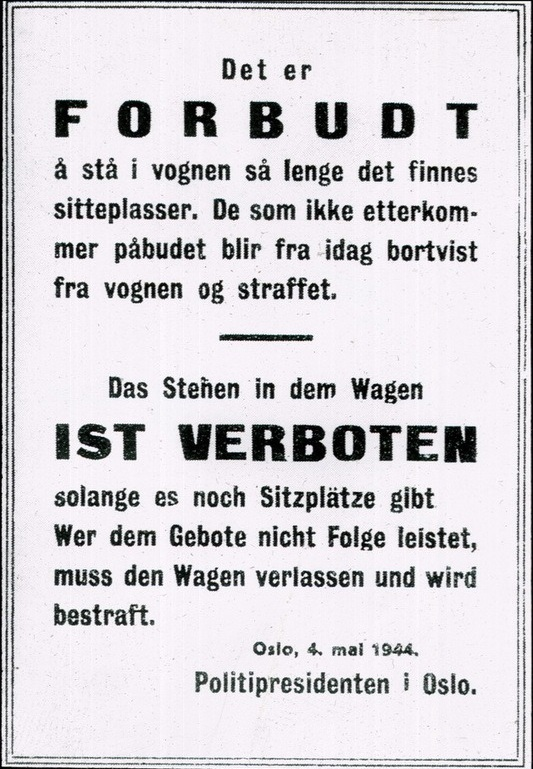
Poster by Norwegian police authorities serving the Germans, sanctioning those who left seats empty next to Germans on buses

The Germans issued ordinances sanctioning such behavior. In Denmark, national identity was reaffirmed through various initiatives, such as wearing a badge with the Danish flag or writing slogans praising King Christian on walls. The Jewish community was generally protected, and the government disregarded or rejected German demands regarding Jews, leaving their civil rights unchanged and equal to those of the rest of the population; this behavior exasperated the German authorities, who decided that forcing the issue would carry the "politically unacceptable" risk of ruining relations with a country considered a model protectorate. Werner Best, a Gestapo member and plenipotentiary in Denmark from November 1942, believed that any attempt to capture Jews would lead to a breakdown in relations between the two governments and recommended taking no action against them in Denmark.

White buses of the Red Cross in German territory, presumably near Friedrichsruh

Toward the end of the war, the Swedish government decided to recover as many Scandinavian prisoners as possible from German concentration camps, including Jews, Danish police officers, Norwegian resistance members, and victims of the German "Night and Fog" program of planned disappearances. The project, called White Buses for the color and type of vehicles used, was soon extended to all prisoners regardless of nationality, with Folke Bernadotte as a key figure, while the press received minimal information and instructions to avoid articles to not provoke the Germans.

In Stockholm, Norwegian diplomat Niels Christian Ditleff worked for his compatriots, but in Denmark, plans were also made to recover detained Danes, primarily led by Admiral Carl Hammerich: the two met to prepare joint actions. However, an attempt to include Danish personnel in the initial Swedish trips was halted on 23 January 1945 by Hitler, who threatened reprisals in Denmark and Norway if the personnel were not entirely Swedish.

The Allies were also informed of the expeditions involving ships and ground vehicles in German-controlled areas regularly targeted by air forces, but the British responded that they could not guarantee the group’s safety in German territory: the expedition in early March 1945 was attacked by RAF aircraft, causing the death of 25 prisoners and one driver. By the end of the program, 15,345 prisoners were recovered at great risk to the operators, all volunteers, mostly from the logistical units of the Swedish army; 7,795 were Scandinavians, and 7,550 were non-Scandinavians (Poles, French, and others). Among them were 423 Danish Jews evacuated from the Theresienstadt concentration camp, while Norwegians were detained in the Sachsenhausen concentration camp.

After the war, Folke Bernadotte, who as president of the Red Cross had sought to save as many people as possible from the Germans, worked to help the German civilian population, especially children. Raoul Wallenberg, sent to Budapest in July 1944 on a diplomatic mission, also had a task, conceived and funded by the U.S. War Refugee Board, through which he saved tens of thousands of Jews; after his disappearance, Sweden did not work to clarify his fate and refused help offered in this regard by the United States. Only after many years did a Swedish commission investigate the facts and suggest that part of Sweden’s passivity was due to the U.S. assignment jeopardizing national neutrality, but without a genuine intent to uncover why Sweden had abandoned Wallenberg.

== See also ==
- Norwegian resistance movement
- Folke Bernadotte
- Raoul Wallenberg

== Bibliography ==
- Bagnasco, Erminio (1969). I MAS e le motosiluranti italiane [The MAS and Italian Torpedo Boats]. Le navi d'Italia, Vol. 6º, 37ª edizione (in Italian). Roma: Marina Militare, Stato Maggiore - Ufficio Storico.
- Colby, William (1981). La mia vita nella CIA [My Life in the CIA] (in Italian). Milano: Mursia. ISBN 88-425-1990-1.
- Dildy, Douglas C. (2009). Blitz tra i ghiacci [Blitz in the Ice] (in Italian). Osprey Publishing/RBA Italia. ISSN 1974-9414.
- Faggioni, Gabriele; Rosselli, Alberto (2010). L'epopea dei convogli e la guerra nel Mare del Nord [The Epic of the Convoys and the War in the North Sea] (in Italian). Mattioli 1885. ISBN 978-88-6261-152-7.
- Liddell Hart, Basil H. (2009) [1970]. Storia militare della seconda guerra mondiale [Military History of the Second World War] (in Italian). Milano: Oscar Storia, Mondadori. ISBN 978-88-04-42151-1.
- Salmaggi, Cesare; Pallavisini, Alfredo (1989). La seconda guerra mondiale [The Second World War] (in Italian). Mondadori. ISBN 88-04-39248-7.
- Peillard, Léonce (1992). La Battaglia dell'Atlantico [The Battle of the Atlantic] (in Italian). Milano: Mondadori. ISBN 88-04-35906-4.
- Lunde, Henrik Olai (2011). Finland's War of Choice: The Troubled German-Finnish Coalition in World War II. Havertown, PA: Casemate Publishers. ISBN 978-1-935149-48-4.
- Mann, Chris (2012). British Policy and Strategy Towards Norway, 1941-45. Palgrave Macmillan. ISBN 978-0-230-21022-6.
- Ržeševskij, Oleg Aleksandrovič (2002). Stalin and the Soviet-Finnish War: 1939-1940. Routledge. ISBN 0-7146-5203-2.
- Persson, Sune (2009). Escape from the Third Reich - Folke Bernadotte and the White Buses. ("Andiamo in Svezia. Gli autobus bianchi nel 1945") [Escape from the Third Reich - Folke Bernadotte and the White Buses ("We’re Going to Sweden. The White Buses in 1945")]. Barnsley: Frontline. ISBN 978-1-84832-556-2.
- Andenæs, Johs (1980) [1979]. Det vanskelige oppgjøret [The Difficult Reckoning] (in Norwegian) (2nd ed.). Oslo: Tanum-Norli. ISBN 82-518-0917-7.
- Berg, Ole F. (1997). I skjærgården og på havet – Marinens krig 8. april 1940 – 8. mai 1945 [In the Archipelago and at Sea – The Navy’s War 8 April 1940 – 8 May 1945] (in Norwegian). Oslo: Marinens krigsveteranforening. ISBN 82-993545-2-8.
- Borgersrud, L. (1997). Wollweber-organisasjonen i Norge - tesi di dottorato [The Wollweber Organization in Norway - Doctoral dissertation] (in Norwegian). Oslo: Universitetsforlaget. p. 581.
- Ericsson, Kjersti (2011). "German brats" or "War Children", in Lars Westerlund (ed.), The children of foreign soldiers in Finland, Denmark, Austria, Poland and Occupied Soviet Karelia (in Norwegian). Nordprint. ISBN 978-951-53-3350-6.
- Jespersen, Knud J. V. (1993). Brigaden. Den danske brigade i Sverige 1943-1945 [The Brigade. The Danish Brigade in Sweden 1943-1945] (in Danish). Gyldendal. p. 288. ISBN 978-87-00-14924-3.
- Thowsen, Atle (1992). Handelsflåten i krig 1939-1945, Book 1, Norrtraship, Profitt og patriotisme [The Merchant Fleet in War 1939-1945, Book 1, Nortraship, Profit and Patriotism] (in Norwegian).
- Ørvik, Nils (1951). Norsk militær i Sverige 1943-1945 [Norwegian Military in Sweden 1943-1945] (in Swedish). Ernst G. Mortensens Forlag.
- Persson, Sune (2002). «Vi åker till Sverige», De vita bussarna 1945 ["We’re Going to Sweden", The White Buses 1945] (in Swedish). Bokförlaget Fischer & co. ISBN 91-85183-18-0.
- Voksø, Per (1984). "Registrering av tre årskull møter motstand; Sabotasje mot registreringen" [Registration of three age groups meets resistance; Sabotage against the registration]. Krigens Dagbok [The War Diary; Registration of three age groups meets resistance; Sabotage against registration] (in Swedish). Oslo: Det Beste. ISBN 82-7010-166-4.
