= Sverre Østhagen =

Norwegian journalist and politician

Sverre Østhagen (21 February 1918 – 15 January 1990) was a Norwegian journalist and politician for the Labour Party.

== Career ==
Østhagen was born in Hamar, a son of Gunnar Østhagen and Louise Rudberg. From 1937 he worked for the sports magazine Idrettsbladet. During the occupation of Norway by Nazi Germany he edited the illegal newspaper Den annen front from 1941 to 1943, when he had to flee to Sweden. He worked for the military intelligence office at the Norwegian Legation in Stockholm from 1943 to 1945, assisting Brynjulv Sjetne, who was the leader of ØXU, the Eastern Norway chapter of the clandestine organization XU. Østhagen recruited several agents for ØXU, including his own father, who was stationmaster at Ådalsbruk Station. He also operated as a courier crossing the Norway–Sweden border several times.

Østhagen was a journalist for Hamar Arbeiderblad from 1945. He was a member of the municipal council for Elverum Municipality from 1945 to 1947. From 1947 to 1951 he was vice mayor of Elverum. He served as a deputy representative to the Norwegian Parliament from Hedmark during two terms, from 1950 to 1957. From 1975 to 1979 he was a member of the County council of Hedmark. He was member of the board of Hedmark Energiverk from 1979. He was a member of the publicity committee of the Norwegian Press Association, and chaired local journalist organizations in both Hamar and Elverum.

Østhagen published several books on the local history of Østerdalen. These include Sør-Østerdal Skikrets historie from 1959 and Østerdalen - vårt nye turistdistrikt from 1965, on skiing and tourism. He wrote the history of three local electricity companies, Elverum Elektrisitetsverk, Åmot Elektrisitetsverk and Hedmark Energiverk.
