= Storsveen =

Storsveen is a Norwegian surname. Notable people with the surname include:

- Arvid Storsveen (1915–1943), Norwegian military officer
- Rolf Storsveen (born 1959), Norwegian biathlete
- Odd Arvid Storsveen (born 1952), Norwegian historian
