= Brynjulf Ottar =

Norwegian atmospheric chemist

- Born: 24 March 1918
- Died: 3 November 1989 (aged 71)
- Education: University of Oslo
- Known for: Air pollution
- Scientific career
- Workplaces: Norwegian Institute for Air Research
- Academic advisors: Odd Hassel

Brynjulf Ottar (1918–1989) was a Norwegian atmospheric chemist who served as the first director of the Norwegian Institute for Air Research. In the 1970s, his work on the long-range transport of air pollution helped to alert the world to the problem of acid rain; later, he was one of the first scientists to describe the mechanism of global distillation (the "grasshopper effect"), by which pollutants travel from mid-latitude parts of Earth to the Arctic.

== Early life and career ==
Ottar studied chemistry at the University of Oslo (UiO) under Odd Hassel during World War II. While there, he helped to found XU, the underground resistance organization opposing the German occupation of Norway, which drew many of its members from UiO's community of science students. After the war ended, Ottar completed a doctorate in chemistry and, in 1951, began working for the Norwegian Defence Research Establishment (FFI), where he became Superintendent of the Division of Chemistry. Later, he joined the Norwegian Institute for Air Research (NILU) and became its first director in 1969.

== Scientific research ==
At NILU, Ottar focused on what became known as transboundary (long-range) air pollution and the mechanisms by which it carried harmful chemicals thousands of kilometers – across entire countries and continents.

During the mid-20th century, disasters such as the Great London Smog of 1952 had highlighted the problem of air pollution, but it was still considered to be essentially a local issue: few realized that pollution could travel, and do damage, over long distances, or that one country's pollution could harm another. Ironically, short-term solutions to local pollution problems often caused wider, long-term issues: the UK's Clean Air Act 1956 "solved" London's smogs through measures such as tall chimneys, which dissipated pollution over a wider area and longer range.

Norwegian scientists had observed the gradual acidification of the country's fresh waters through much of the 20th century, but it was only with the publication of pioneering work on acid rain by Svante Odén, in the late 1960s, that the causes became apparent. Ottar observed that thousands of lakes in Norway had become acidified and biologically impoverished due to industrial and power plant pollution from countries such as Britain, France, Germany, and Luxembourg.

In 1970, he was appointed director of the OECD-sponsored Long-Range Transboundary Air Pollution Project and championed cooperative international efforts to monitor the problem of acid rain, despite resistance from the countries concerned and the stark political divisions of the Cold War era. Ottar noted that "Norway, Sweden, and Finland are geographically in a particularly exposed situation, and receive considerably larger [pollution] contributions from other countries than from their own sources". In 1974, for example, Norway was estimated to have received 30,000 tonnes of sulphur pollution from within its own borders but 60,000 tonnes from the UK and Ireland; by contrast, the UK and Ireland received zero sulphur pollution from Norway. The project eventually concluded that "Sulphur compounds do travel long distances in the atmosphere and the air quality in any European country is measurably affected by emissions from other European countries".

In 1977, following the conclusion of the project, Ottar wrote a paper titled "International Agreement Needed to Reduce Long-Range Transport of Air Pollutants in Europe"; two years later, 51 countries signed the UN Convention on Long-Range Transboundary Air Pollution (LRTAP). Ultimately, however, Ottar's efforts were thwarted by resistance from countries such as Britain that were causing much of the pollution. As Dr Rachel Emma Rothschild notes, in a detailed account of his work: "Ottar was given the opportunity to organize a study of unprecedented scale on acid rain, but had little recourse to set the agenda, police the countries withholding financial contributions, or rectify their poor participation... As a result, knowledge about the transport of air pollution was substantially increased—though, as Ottar lamented, in the end the research was not enough to prompt international action on the environmental threat of acid rain."

In the early 1980s, Ottar became one of the first scientists to describe the mechanism by which harmful chemicals produced at mid-latitudes can be transported, via the atmosphere, to the Arctic – a phenomenon called global distillation.

== Selected publications ==
=== Books and reports ===
- Ottar, Brynjulf (1958). Self-diffusion and fluidity in liquids. Oslo: Oslo University Press. OCLC 1291186.
- Ottar, Brynjulf, ed. (1980). Sources and Significance of Natural and Man-Made Aerosols in the Arctic: Report of a Workshop Supported and Organised by the U.S. Office of Naval Research and the Norwegian Institute for Air Research, Lillestrøm, 27-28 April 1977. ISBN 82-7247-180-9.
- Pacyna, Jozef M.; Ottar, Brynjulf (1989). Control and Fate of Atmospheric Trace Metals. Netherlands: Springer. ISBN 9789400923157.

=== Articles and scientific papers ===
- Ottar, Brynjulf; Pacyna, Jozef; Berg, Thor (1967). "Aircraft Measurements of Air Pollution in the Norwegian Arctic". Atmospheric Environment. 20 (1): 87–100. doi:10.1016/0004-6981(86)90209-X. hdl:11250/2717623. ISSN 0004-6981.
- Ottar, Brynjulf (1976). "Monitoring Long-Range Transport of Air Pollutants: The OECD Study". Ambio. 5 (6): 203–206. JSTOR 4312216.
- Ottar, Brynjulf (1977). "International Agreement Needed to Reduce Long-Range Transport of Air Pollutants in Europe". Ambio. 6 (5): 262–269. JSTOR 4312295.
- Ottar, Brynjulf (1978). "An Assessment of the OECD Study on Long Range Transport of Air Pollutants (Lrtap)". Sulfur in the Atmosphere: Proceedings of the International Symposium Held in Dubrovnik, Yugoslavia, 7–14 September 1977. pp. 445–454. doi:10.1016/B978-0-08-022932-4.50049-5. ISBN 9780080229324.
- Ottar, Brynjulf (1981). "The transfer of airborne pollutants to the Arctic region". Atmospheric Environment. 15 (8): 1439–1445. Bibcode:1981AtmEn..15.1439O. doi:10.1016/0004-6981(81)90350-4.
- Oehme, M; Ottar, B (1984). "The Long-Range Transport of Polychlorinated Hydrocarbons to the Arctic". Geophys Res Lett. 11 (11): 1133–1136. Bibcode:1984GeoRL..11.1133O. doi:10.1029/GL011i011p01133.
