= Rolv Henden =

Norwegian businessman and resistance member (1914-1992)

Rolv Henden (1914 – 1992) was a Norwegian businessperson and resistance member.

He was born in Sandane, Norway. During the Second World War he made his mark as a secret agent in the organization XU. In his civic career he was the managing director of Firda Billag from 1940 to 1982.
