= Sam Melberg =

Norwegian sportsman (1912–1998)

- Born: 9 September 1912; Halden, Norway
- Died: 11 November 1998 (aged 86)
- Occupations: Sports diver and sports instructor.
- Relatives: Håkon Melberg (brother)

Sam Melberg (9 September 1912 – 11 November 1998) was a Norwegian sports diver and sports instructor. He won several Norwegian championships in diving, and competed at the Olympic games.

== Career ==
Melberg was born in Halden, and was a brother of linguist Håkon Melberg. He competed at the 1936 Summer Olympics in Berlin, where he placed 21st in 10 metre platform. At the Norwegian national diving championships he won a total of fifteen gold medals during his career. Two of his successes also earned him the King's Cup, in 1932 and 1935 respectively. He represented the clubs Haldens SK and SK Speed.

Melberg was running a physiotherapy centre in Halden. He had learned the Japanese martial art of jujutsu, and started jujutsu training courses in Halden in the fall of 1940. His courses soon became popular, and his brother Håkon Melberg eventually joined as instructor. From March 1941 he was also running jujutsu courses in Oslo. He wrote the book Jiu-jitsu – Knep og parader til selvforsvar, which was published in 1942. His brother Håkon contributed to the book by writing the preface.

He was a resistance member during World War II, and was arrested twice by the Germans. The first time he was arrested and sent to Bredtveit concentration camp on 11 May 1942, then released on 28 May 1942. The second time he was arrested on 13 October 1943 and imprisoned at Møllergata 19 from 14 October 1943. On 26 November 1943 he was transferred to Grini concentration camp and given the prisoner number 8935. On 9 December 1943 he was sent to the Sachsenhausen concentration camp, where he was prisoner number 74254 until the end of the war.
