= Øistein Strømnæs =

Øistein Strømnæs (28 June 1914 – 21 July 1980) was the head of XU, the main Norwegian intelligence organization from 1943 to 1945.

Strømnæs was born in Sarpsborg in Østfold county, Norway. He studied biology at the University of Oslo and was working on a master's degree in botany when Norway was attacked in 1940. To support his studies he also had a part-time job as a police constable, this proved very valuable when he got involved in intelligence.

Recruited by one of the founders of XU, Captain Eivind Hjelle, Strømnæs joined XU in August 1940. Strømnæs was said to be a "natural agent", and he had a very relaxed tone with his agents. Strømnæs assumed the leadship of XU when Arvid Storsveen was killed in April 1943. He worked undercover in Oslo until the end of World War II. Strømnæs focused on security to the point Defense Command in London, did not know the real identity of the chairman of the intelligence service.

After the liberation of Norway Strømnæs received a scholarship and earned his doctor's degree at the University of California, Berkeley. Anne-Sofie Østvedt (1920–2009), former vice chairman of the XU also attended college at Berkeley. The couple was married in 1946. Anne-Sofie Strømnæs received her master's degree in food chemistry at Berkeley. They moved home to Norway after completing studies in 1951. For many years, Strømnæs was assistant professor and later associate professor of genetics at the University of Oslo.

== Other sources ==
- Sæter, Einar; Sæter, Svein (2007) XU - I Hemmeleg Teneste 1940-45 (Oslo: Det Norske Samlaget) ISBN 978-82-521-7208-9
