= Norwegian resistance movement =

Resistance to German occupation in WWII

Norwegian resistance
- Part of European theatre of World War II
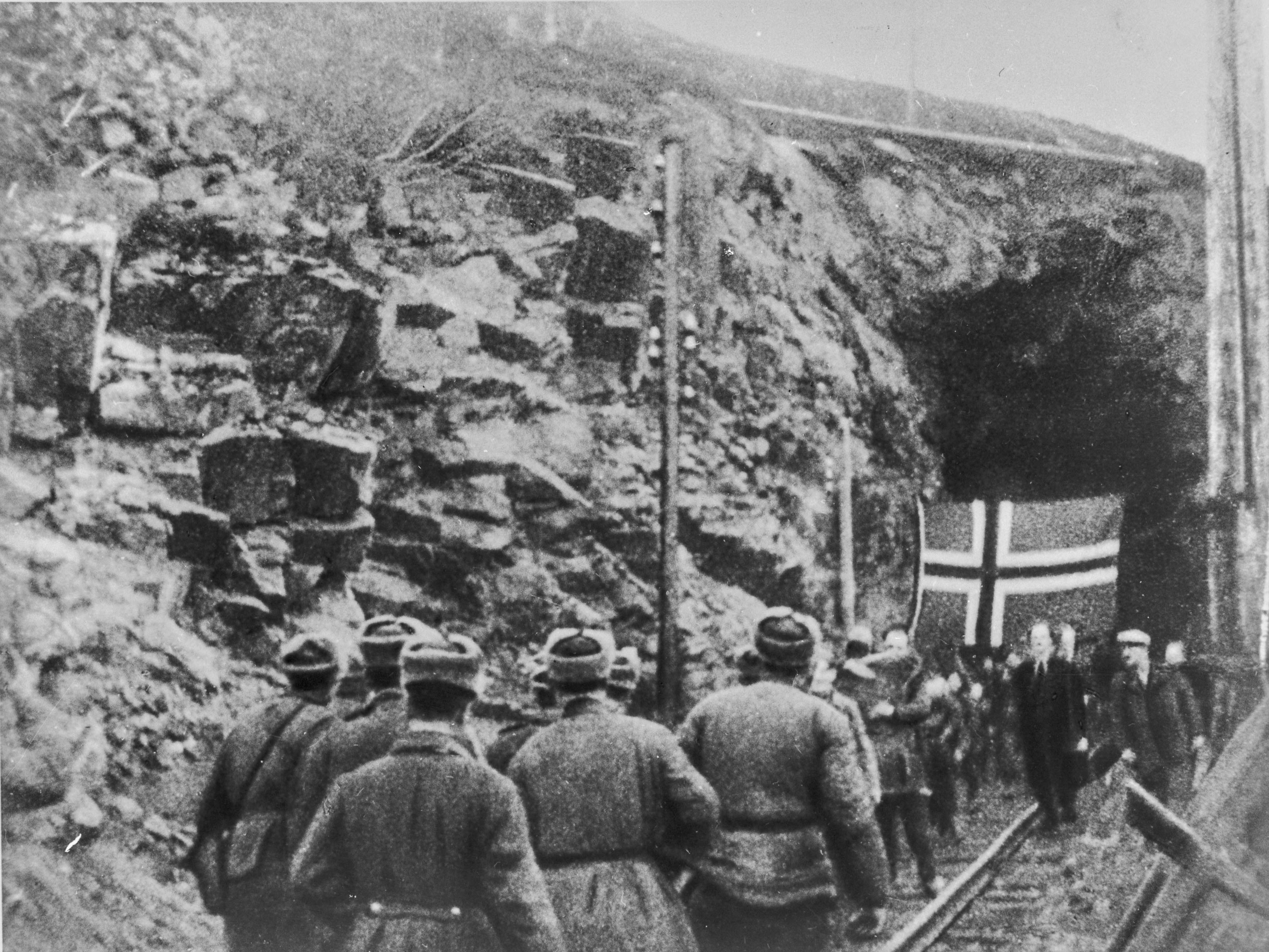
- Soviets meet Norwegians sheltering in a mine in Finnmark
Date	10 June 1940 – 7 May 1945; 4 years, 10 months, 3 weeks, and 6 days
Location	Norway
Result	German forces surrender in Norway; Liberation of Norway

Belligerents
Norway; Norwegian resistance groups United Kingdom; United States (from 1941); Soviet Union (from 1944); Poland; Training and Material Support: Sweden	Germany: Quisling regime; Reichskommissariat Norwegen

Commanders and leaders
(Norway) Haakon VII (United Kingdom) Winston Churchill (Soviet Union) Joseph Stalin	(Norway) Vidkun Quisling (Nazi Germany) Josef Terboven (Nazi Germany) Franz Böhme

The Norwegian resistance (Norwegian: Motstandsbevegelsen) to the occupation of Norway by Nazi Germany began after Operation Weserübung in 1940 and ended in 1945. It took several forms:

- Asserting the legitimacy of the exiled government, and by implication the lack of legitimacy of Vidkun Quisling's pro-Nazi regime and Josef Terboven's military administration
- The initial defence in Southern Norway, which was largely disorganised, but succeeded in allowing the government to escape capture
- The more organised military defence and counter-attacks in parts of Western and Northern Norway, aimed at securing strategic positions and the evacuation of the government
- Armed resistance, in the form of sabotage, commando raids, assassinations and other special operations during the occupation
- Civil disobedience and unarmed resistance

== Asserting legitimacy of exiled Norwegian government ==
The Norwegian government of Prime Minister Johan Nygaardsvold, with the exception of foreign minister Halvdan Koht and minister of defence Birger Ljungberg, was largely caught by surprise when it became apparent in the early hours of 9 April 1940 that Nazi Germany had launched an invasion of Norway. Although some of the country's gold reserve had already been removed from Oslo, there were few contingency plans for such an invasion.

The Norwegian government was unprepared and unwilling to capitulate to the ultimatum timed to coincide with the arrival of German troops and delivered by Curt Bräuer, the German representative in Oslo. The German demand that Norway accept the "protection of the Reich" was rebuffed by Koht and the Norwegian government before dawn had broken on the morning of invasion. "Vi gir oss ikke frivillig, kampen er allerede i gang", replied Koht. "We will not submit voluntarily; the fight is already underway."

Anticipating German efforts to capture the government, the entire Norwegian parliament (the Storting), the royal family, and cabinet hastily evacuated Oslo by train and car to Hamar and then on to Elverum, where an extraordinary session of parliament was called. In large part because of the presence of mind of the parliament's president C. J. Hambro, the Storting managed to pass an emergency measure (known as the Elverum Authorization) that gave full authority to the king and his cabinet until the Storting could convene again.

This gave King Haakon VII and the cabinet constitutional authority to reject the German emissary's ultimatum to accept the German invasion. Although there were several German attempts to capture or kill the King and the Norwegian government, they managed to evade these attempts and travelled through Norway's remote interior until leaving the country for London on the British heavy cruiser HMS Devonshire on 7 June.

Reserving the constitutional legitimacy of the Norwegian government also undermined Vidkun Quisling's attempts at claiming the Norwegian government for himself. After Quisling had proclaimed his assumption of the government, several individuals on the Supreme Court took the initiative to establish an Administrative Council (Administrasjonsrådet) in an effort to stop him. This became a controversial initiative, in that the legitimate Norwegian government refused to give the council any legal backing, and the German authorities ended up disbanding it.

== Initial defence ==
Although some politicians across the political spectrum had advocated strengthening the country's defence capabilities, a longstanding policy of disarmament following World War I had left the Norwegian military underfunded and undertrained by the late 1930s. As a result, forces in Southern Norway were largely unprepared for the German invasion, and the invading German army met little initial resistance.

There was also spirited defence seen at other locations, including Midtskogen, Hegra and Narvik but these were largely the result of improvised missions by isolated military units and irregular volunteers. The battles slowed the German advance by several days, allowing the Norwegian government to evade capture and conduct critical constitutional business.

The British and French began landing on Norwegian soil within a week of the German invasion.

== Counter-attacks ==
Several Norwegian military units that had mobilised as a precautionary measure in Northern Norway during the Winter War, in cooperation with Polish, French and British forces, launched several counterattacks with moderate success. Allied forces had several successes in Northern Norway, but were redirected for the futile defense of France. While Northern Norway ultimately fell, efforts there allowed the Norwegian government, including the Norwegian royal family, to escape and maintain the legitimate government in exile, as part of the Allies.

While on station in London, the government contributed to Norwegian forces with the Allied effort and ordered the Norwegian Merchant Fleet to assist in troop transportation. To expedite this ships operated under the Nortraship organisation, which at that time was the world's largest shipping company. It created apprehension among the Nazi leadership that Allied forces might try to recapture Norway with the intention of denying German naval units access to the North Atlantic, tying up several hundred thousand troops that otherwise might have been deployed to other fronts.

== Armed resistance ==
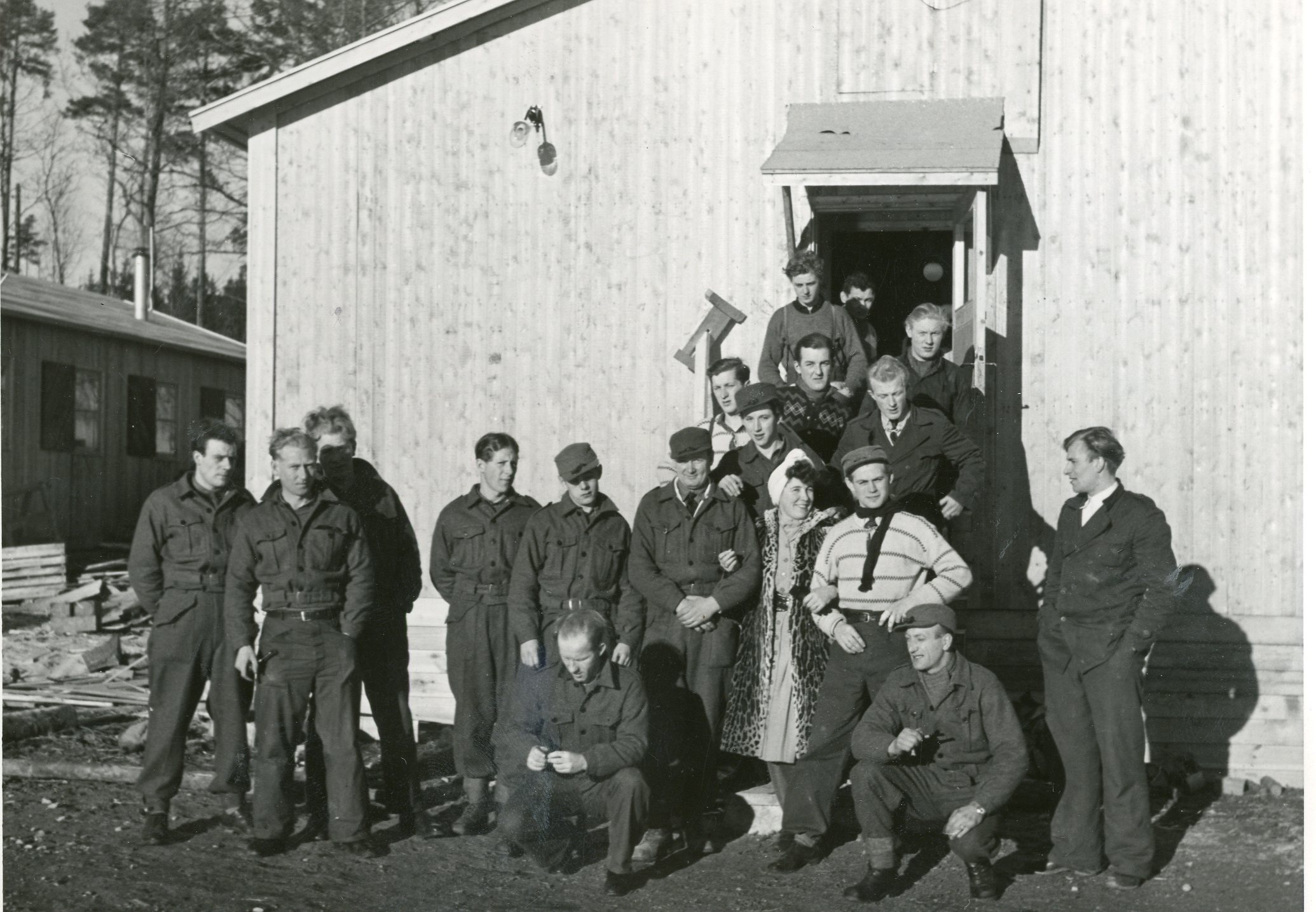
Norwegian refugees undergoing military training in Sweden

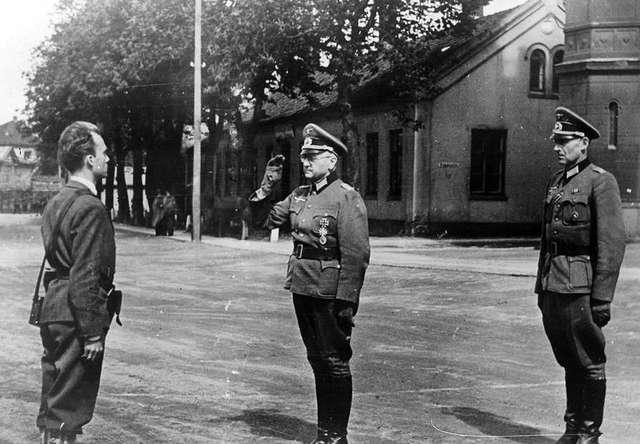
The German surrender of Akershus Fortress to Terje Rollem on 11 May 1945.

Although Norway did not have any major battles beyond those of the Norwegian campaign, a number of military operations served to subvert the Nazi authorities and contribute to the larger war effort. Milorg started out as a small sabotage unit and ended up building a full military force in time for the liberation. Company Linge was a special operations (SOE) unit that specialised in coastal insertions and combat. There were repeated raids in Lofoten, Måløy, and other coastal areas.

Norwegian spotters aided in the destruction of numerous German warships, such as the battleships Bismarck and Tirpitz. The Norwegian resistance also smuggled people in and out of Norway during the war, through Sweden or by fishing boats to Shetland, nicknamed the "Shetland bus". A number of saboteurs, most notably Max Manus and Gunnar Sønsteby, destroyed ships and supplies. Perhaps its most famous achievements were a series of operations to destroy Norsk Hydro's heavy water plant and stockpile of heavy water at Vemork, crippling the German nuclear programme. The Germans attempted to stifle Resistance activities and executed several innocent Norwegian men, women, and children in retaliation after any Resistance act. Probably the worst act of reprisal was the assault on the fishing village of Telavåg in the spring of 1942.

To assist with the sabotage campaign, the United States sent OSS forces, including future CIA director William Colby, into Norway to support resistance. In the mid-1980s, it was revealed that Sweden aided the Norwegian resistance movement with training and equipment in a series of camps along the Norwegian border. To avoid suspicion, they were camouflaged as police training camps. By 1944, some 7,000–8,000 men had been secretly trained in Sweden.

During the Liberation of Finnmark from 1944 to 1945, 1,442 police troops from Sweden would be flown in to assist the Soviets and Free Norwegian Forces. In addition to forces brought in from abroad, local troops were also recruited.

Intelligence gathering within occupied Norway was very much needed for the Allied forces, and several organizations were established for this, the largest and most efficient of which was called XU. Established by Arvid Storsveen, its members were students from the University of Oslo. One interesting fact was that two of its four leaders were young women, among them Anne-Sofie Østvedt.

One of the leading sabotage organisations in Norway during most of World War II was the communist Osvald Group led by Asbjørn Sunde.

During the war years, the resistance movement in occupied Norway had 1,433 members killed, of whom 255 were women.

== Civil disobedience ==
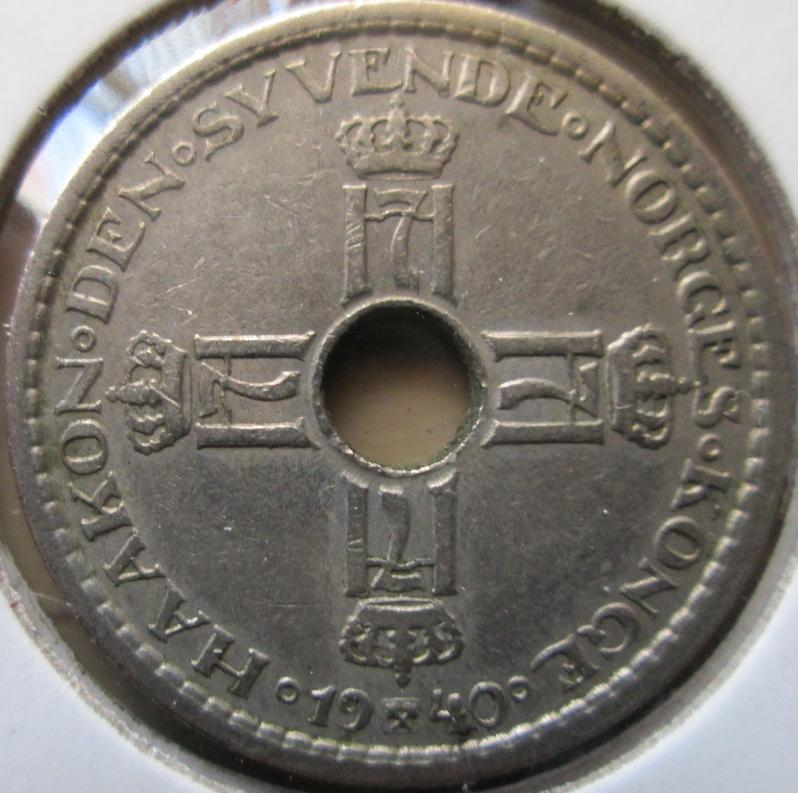
The obverse of a 1940 Norwegian krone. Coins with the H7 monogram were worn by Norwegian nationalists as jewellery during the occupation, and subsequently confiscated by German authorities.

The first mass outbreak of civil disobedience occurred in the autumn of 1940, when students of Oslo University began to wear paper clips on their lapels to demonstrate their resistance to the German occupiers and their Norwegian collaborators. A seemingly innocuous item, the paper clip was a symbol of solidarity and unity ("we are bound together"), implying resistance. The wearing of paper clips, the popular H7 monogram and similar symbols (red garments, Bobble hats) was outlawed and could lead to arrest and punishment.

Of lesser military importance was the distribution of illegal newspapers (often with news items culled from Allied news broadcasts; possession of radios was illegal). The purpose of this was twofold: it counteracted Nazi propaganda, and it maintained nationalistic, anti-German feelings in the population at large. It has been suggested that combating the illegal press expended German resources out of proportion to the illegal media's actual effects.

Finally, there was the attempt at maintaining an "ice front" against the German soldiers. This involved, among other things, never speaking to a German if it could be avoided (many pretended to speak no German, though it was then almost as prevalent as English is now) and refusing to sit beside a German on public transport. The latter was so annoying to the occupying German authorities that it became illegal to stand on a bus if seats were available.

Nazi authorities (both German and Norwegian) attempted to pressure school teachers into supporting the regime and its propaganda. Wages were withheld, and on 20 March 1942, 1100 male teachers were arrested, of which 642 were sent to Arctic Norway doing forced labour.

Towards the end of the war, the resistance became more open, with rudimentary military organizations set up in the forests around the larger cities. A number of Nazi collaborators and officials were killed, and those collaborating with the German or Quisling authorities were ostracized, both during and after the war.

The Norwegian Resistance Museum, at Akershus Fortress, Oslo, gives a good account of the activities of the Norwegian resistance movement.

== See also ==
- Allied campaign in Norway
- Flight of the Norwegian National Treasury
- Free Norwegian Forces
- H7 (monogram)
- Milorg
- No. 10 (Inter-Allied) Commando
- Norway's Resistance Museum
- Norwegian heavy water sabotage
- Norwegian Independent Company 1
- Operation Archery
- Oslo Gang
- Scandinavian theatre of World War II
- Tarnschriften
- They Raid by Night
