= Lauritz Sand =

Norwegian resistance member (1879–1956)

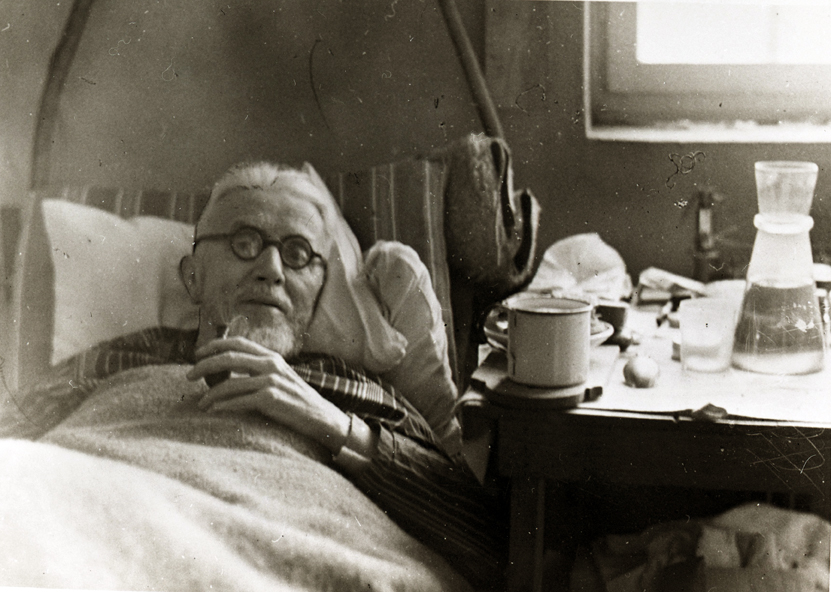
- Sand in 1945
- Born: 1 October 1879; Trondheim, Norway
- Died: 17 December 1956 (aged 77); Bærum, Norway
- Spouse: Annie Elisabeth Maria Moll (m. 1911)
- Military career
- Allegiance: Netherlands; Norway
- Branch: Royal Dutch East Indies Army; Norwegian resistance movement
- Service years: 1899–1906 (Netherlands); 1940–45 (Norway)
- Commands: XU
- Awards: Royal Norwegian Order of St. Olav
- Other work: Topographer, estate owner in the Dutch East Indies, business man

Lauritz Sand (1 October 1879 – 17 December 1956) was a Norwegian topographer, military officer in the Dutch army, estate owner in the Dutch East Indies, business man and resistance pioneer of World War II. He was called the hardest tortured person in Norway during the war, and came to be an important symbol of the resistance against the Nazi regime.

== Early and personal life ==
Sand was born in Trondheim, as a son of Fritz Julius Sand and his wife Anna Bergithe Kavli. He studied architecture at Stockholms tekniske skole in Sweden from 1897 to 1899. Architecture was not his main interest, and he wanted to be an artist. He tried his way as a sculptor at the age of nineteen, but received negative criticism, and then immediately started on a military career. He married Dutch citizen Annie Elisabeth Maria Moll in Java in 1911.

== Career ==
=== Military and plantation career ===
Sand had a military career in the Royal Dutch East Indies Army. He followed military education in Harderwijk and Batavia. In the Dutch East Indies he subsequently participated as a geodete in the surveying of the islands of the Dutch East Indies. He retired as an officer in 1906, and started to work in the plantation business. He was manager of the Pagilaran Estates from 1911, and founded the Zuid Sumatra Syndicate in 1918. From 1922 to 1940 he was superintendent for the Anglo-Dutch Plantations.

=== World War II ===
Sand returned to Norway in 1938, settling at Bekkestua. When the war broke out, he became a pioneer in the resistance work. He was active in several areas, but eventually focused on intelligence, particularly photographing and mapping of German military installations. His network, which among others included military officers John Hagle and Eivind Hjelle, developed into the clandestine organisation XU. The name XU (X=unknown, U=undercover agent) was taken from an undercover group Sand had run in the Dutch East Indies during World War I. Sand distinguished himself amongst the early resistance as "dynamic and outward, with temperament and inspiration."

Sand was arrested in September 1941, having been turned in by Abwehr agent Laura Johannessen, who had befriended Sand and infiltrated his group. Through several friendly meetings with Sand at the restaurant Theatercaféen at Oslo's Hotel Continental Johannesen had acquired a good insight into the activities of Sand and his companions. He carried compromising documents at the time of the arrest. The same night Hagle and Helle were also hunted by the Germans, but managed to escape, fleeing to Sweden and later travelled to London. The 62-year-old Sand was heavily tortured by the Gestapo at Victoria Terrasse, Gestapo leader Siegfried Wolfgang Fehmer leading the interrogations, and was brought to Grini "more dead than alive", seriously wounded in the head and back, and with broken arms and legs. New, violent interrogations followed. During the rest of the war he was kept in isolation, partly at Grini, partly at Møllergata 19, and partly in hospitals. It was said he was the hardest tortured person in Norway, and his example became a symbol of the resistance against the Nazi regime. In the late phase of the war he was told that his execution by gunshot was planned for 17 May 1945; however he was saved when the Nazis surrendered on 8 May.

Sand was haunted by pains, stress, nightmares and hallucinations after the liberation, but worked for war veterans for the rest of his life. He was decorated as a Knight of the Royal Norwegian Order of St. Olav in 1945. A bust of Sand, with the single word "Nei" (English: No), was revealed at Griniveien near Eiksmarka in 1952, with the presence of both King Haakon and Crown Prince Olav. The word "Nei" was inscribed on the bust because this was the only answer Sand would give his interrogators during the four years of captivity and torture, despite having "every bone in his body" systematically broken, and being left to die several times. Sand died, from the wounds he sustained during World War II captivity, on 17 December 1956 in Bærum. The bust was moved slightly in 1980.
