= Håkon Melberg =

Norwegian linguist

- Born: January 1, 1911; Halden, Norway
- Died: November 4, 1990 (aged 79)
- Education: University of Oslo
- Occupation: Linguist
- Relatives: Sam Melberg (brother)

Håkon Melberg (January 1, 1911 – November 4, 1990) was one of Norway's foremost linguists. He knew 42 languages and could communicate in an additional 20.

Born in Halden, Melberg graduated from the Halden Latin School in 1930 with top grades. He went on to study languages and linguistics at the University of Oslo for 6 or 7 years, but left without obtaining a formal degree. He received a scholarship to study modern English in London as preparation for a professorate in English, and wrote the novel 'Solen går aldri ned' in 1938. Melberg then received research funding from NAVF to study Celtic languages, staying in Ireland, Wales, Scotland, and Brittany for long periods. To support a rather meagre economy and encourage the work with Celtic languages, Thomas Coats 2nd Baron Glentanar and the Earl of Bute gave Melberg a sum of money that he did not use himself, but instead handed over to Oslo University in support of a Celtic institute.

During the occupation years in Norway, Melberg was one of the leaders of XU Pan, a spy organisation that collected secret German information and transmitted it to London. This work is described in the book 'Dobbeltspill – Nazilensmannen som lurte tyskerne' (1988) by T. Brynildsen and H. Melberg.

From 1940 to 1943, Melberg worked as a jiu jitsu instructor at his brother Sam's training institute in Oslo. Melberg wrote the introductory chapter titled "Vitenskapen å slåss" ("The Science of Fighting") to Sam's book, 'Jiu Jitsu'.

In September 1945, Melberg presented the first version of his hypothesis on the origin of the Scandinavian nations to the Norwegian Science Academy in Oslo. It was met with silence. A year later, it was presented to the Danish Science Academy in Copenhagen, where it provoked animated discussion. Due to misunderstandings and the need for background information that became apparent during these discussions, Melberg decided to present his work with all the information required to evaluate the hypothesis. The outcome was the two-volume work, 'Origin of the Scandinavian Nations and Languages' (1953). They are available with searchable text in and

After the publication of that work, Melberg continued his work with Celtic languages for some years. The rest of his active life was spent working with and for children in Halden. In 1945, Melberg and his wife began running an activity center for children called Barnas hus. He wrote the text for a children's opera, 'Nattmannens barn', which was first presented in 1960. Melberg died in 1990.
