= Arvid Storsveen =

Norwegian resistance member

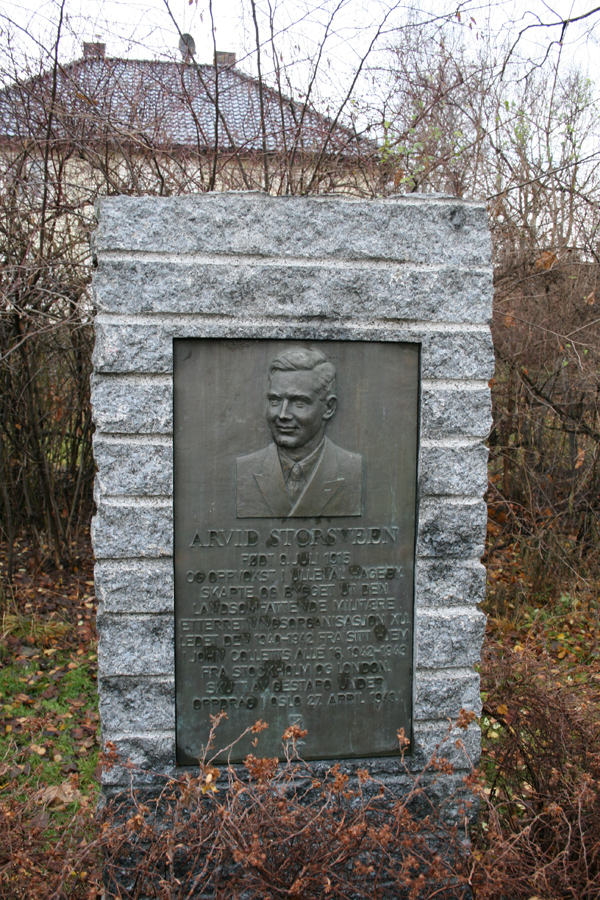
Commemorative plaque for Arvid Storsveen at Arvid Storsveens plass in Oslo

Arvid Kristian Storsveen (9 July 1915 – 27 April 1943) was a Norwegian Military Officer and organizer of the secret agency XU, the main intelligence gathering organisation within occupied Norway during World War II.

== Biography ==
Arvid Kristian Storsveen was born in Aker, Norway. Storsveen studied engineering at the Norwegian Institute of Technology in Trondheim. After graduation in 1939, he was employed at the Norwegian Water Resources and Electricity in Oslo, Norway.

Lt. Storsveen took part in the Norwegian Campaign against the Nazi German invasion forces in the spring of 1940. Following the Norwegian surrender, he soon saw the value of an intelligence-gathering organisation for the Allies. This organisation, called 'XU', was started as early as July 1940 and became a reliable source of information for the Supreme Allied Commander in London. Many of the members were obtained from science students at the University of Oslo. After two years of dangerous work, Storsveen was forced to escape to neutral Sweden in July 1942, successfully evading the German units who were tracking him down.

He returned to Oslo in the spring of 1943, but due to an accident he was found and killed by the Gestapo on 27 April. Storsveen carried false documentation on his person; even after his death, the Gestapo never realised the true identity of the man they had killed and so his organisation was able to recover from the incident. Øistein Strømnæs assumed the leadership of XU when Storsveen was killed. 1st Lt. Storsveen was posthumously awarded Norway's highest decoration for military gallantry, the War Cross with sword. He was buried at Vestre gravlund in Oslo .

== Legacy ==
Arvid Storsveens plass is a small park with playground at Blindern in the district Nordre Aker in Oslo. A memorial to Storsveen has been unveiled at the site.

== See also ==
- German occupation of Norway
- Norwegian resistance movement
- Milorg
