= Anne-Sofie Østvedt =

Norwegian resistance member

- Born: 2 January 1920; Oslo, Norway
- Died: 16 November 2009 (aged 89)
- Allegiance: Norway
- Conflicts: Second World War

Anne-Sofie Østvedt (later married Strømnæs) (2 January 1920 – 16 November 2009) was one of the leaders of the Norwegian intelligence organisation XU.

== World War II ==
She started her resistance work by publishing underground newspapers, and in December 1941 XU recruited her. The Gestapo began hunting her in the autumn of 1942, and she had to live undercover for the rest of the war.

Despite her young age, she held a senior position within the organisation, serving as second in command. Her identity was kept strictly secret, and few within the XU knew who she was. Since one of her cover names, "Aslak," was a male name in Norway, many who met her after the war were surprised to learn her true identity.

== Post-World War II ==
After the end of the war she received a scholarship and from the summer of 1945 she studied chemistry at the University of California, Berkeley, graduated with a master's degree and then returned to Norway in 1951. Studying with her in California was the leader of XU, Øistein Strømnæs, whom she married.
