= Brynjulv Sjetne =

Norwegian politician

Brynjulv Sjetne (25 May 1917 – 8 April 1976) was a Norwegian politician for the Labour Party.

During the occupation of Norway by Nazi Germany he established the Hedmark and Oppland chapter of XU, later called ØXU. He fled to Sweden in 1943, and worked as a Lieutenant at the Military Office at the Norwegian Legation in Stockholm.

In 1965, during the fourth cabinet Gerhardsen, he was appointed state secretary in the Ministry of Local Government and Labour. He served as a deputy representative to the Norwegian Parliament from Oppland during the term 1961–1965.
