= XU =

Norwegian clandestine intelligence organisation during World War II

XU (X for "unknown" and U for "undercover agent") was a clandestine intelligence organisation working on behalf of Allied powers in occupied Norway during World War II. Though its work proved invaluable for operations against German operations in Norway, most of its operations, organization, etc., were kept secret until 1988.

The name of the organization may have derived from Lauritz Sand, one of the founding members, who had previously worked for British intelligence in the Dutch East Indies and coined the name XU, X for "unknown" and U for "undercover agent" for his group. During the early stages of the German occupation of Norway, Sand collaborated with an intelligence group led by major John Hagle and captain Eivind Hjelle. By July 1940, this group came into contact with another group led by Arvid Storsveen.

Although XU was initially organized by a leadership with a military background, its further development relied heavily upon recruiting students from the University of Oslo. As it grew, the group also included professionals around Norway, within railroads, police and so on, and collected maps and photos of German fortifications and forces.

XU was initially organised as part of the Milorg, but as the Norwegian resistance movement grew, it became essential to compartmentalise organisations and teams and thereby enhance security against Nazi and Quisling infiltration, so XU split from the Milorg in the autumn of 1941 when Lauritz Sand and many others were arrested by the Gestapo. Milorg was the Norwegian counterpart to the sabotage service, the Special Operations Executive and so answered to Department FO. IV of the Norwegian High Command. From 1941, XU answered to Department FO. II, which was the branch that worked with Britain's intelligence service SIS.

In the spring of 1942, the Gestapo became aware of XU's activities and initiated operations to identify and arrest its leaders. Several leaders from the Oslo cell, including Storsveen, fled to neutral Sweden in July 1942, and set up headquarters for the organization there. They continued to move in and out of Norway, and Storsveen was killed in a Gestapo operation in Oslo in April 1943 without revealing his role in XU. XU continued its work under the leadership of Øistein Strømnæs and Anne-Sofie Østvedt, whose identities were kept secret until recently.

Strømnæs led XU from occupied Oslo for the rest of the war. Apart from supplying the Allied forces with very detailed data about the state of German forces in Norway, XU also had connections within Nazi Germany. Several of their members were couriers for MI5 agent Paul Rosbaud who had vital information regarding German nuclear research.

By the end of the war XU had some 1,500 agents all over Norway and had developed a sophisticated courier system to the United Kingdom through neutral Sweden. The amount of information could amount to some 500 A4 pages supplied every day. The highly accurate and current intelligence enabled the Allied forces to maintain detailed information about the deployment and condition of German forces throughout Norway. This information proved vital in strategic bombing raids and would have been invaluable if an invasion had been necessary.

XU maintained strict discipline around its cell structure, and the courier system was based on anonymous transfer of information. In one case, it turned out that two operatives who only knew each other by each other's shoes were close friends outside the XU network.

After the war ended, confiscated Gestapo information revealed that the Gestapo in Norway had very little intelligence on the size, scope, members, and operations of XU.

The existence of XU was not revealed to the general public until around 1980, when the Norwegian government decided to decorate some of the XU members. The government was criticized for waiting for so long, especially since many double agents, otherwise sworn to secrecy, were convicted as collaborators during the post-war treason trials. Their names were cleared after 1980, and as of 2006, nearly all documents regarding the XU have been released to the public.

== Some members ==
- Vilhelm Aubert
- Otto Erling Aurstad
- Eric Bentsen
- Sverre Bergh
- Johan Borse (Svensen)
- Sønnøv Sem Borse
- Eilif Dahl
- William Dall
- Andreas Garstad
- Rolv Henden
- Knut Løfsnes
- Astrid Løken
- Lars Lund
- Håkon Melberg
- Ole Henrik Moe
- Arne Næss
- Otto Øgrim
- Sverre Østhagen
- Anne-Sofie Østvedt
- Brynjulf Ottar
- Leif Owren
- Ivan Rosenquist
- Lauritz Sand
- Brynjulv Sjetne
- Kasper Skjeggenes
- Sven Sømme
- Arvid Storsveen
- Øistein Strømnæs
- Nic Waal

== Sources ==
- Sæter, Einar; Sæter, Svein (2007) [2007]. XU - I Hemmeleg Teneste 1940-45 (in Norwegian) (3rd (revised) ed.). Oslo: Det Norske Samlaget. ISBN 978-82-521-7208-9.
