= 1949 in Norway =

- Centuries: 18th; 19th; 20th; 21st
- Decades: 1920s; 1930s; 1940s; 1950s; 1960s
- See also: List of years in Norway

These events took place in the year 1949 in Norway.

== Incumbents ==
- Monarch – Haakon VII.
- Prime Minister – Einar Gerhardsen (Labour Party)

== Events ==
- October 10 – The 1949 Parliamentary election takes place.
- November 20 – Hurum air disaster: an Aero Holland Douglas DC-3 crashes near Hurum, Norway, killing 34 of the 35 on board, including 26 Jewish children from Tunisia on their way to Norway, as an intermediary stop before immigrating to Israel.
- Norway joined NATO as one of the 12 founding members, and signed the North Atlantic Treaty.

== Popular culture ==
=== Sports ===
- Martin Stokken, cross country skier and athlete, is awarded the Egebergs Ærespris for excellence in more than one sport, and the Norwegian Sportsperson of the Year.

=== Literature ===
- The Knut Hamsund novel Paa gjengrodde Stier (On Overgrown Paths), was published.

== Notable births ==
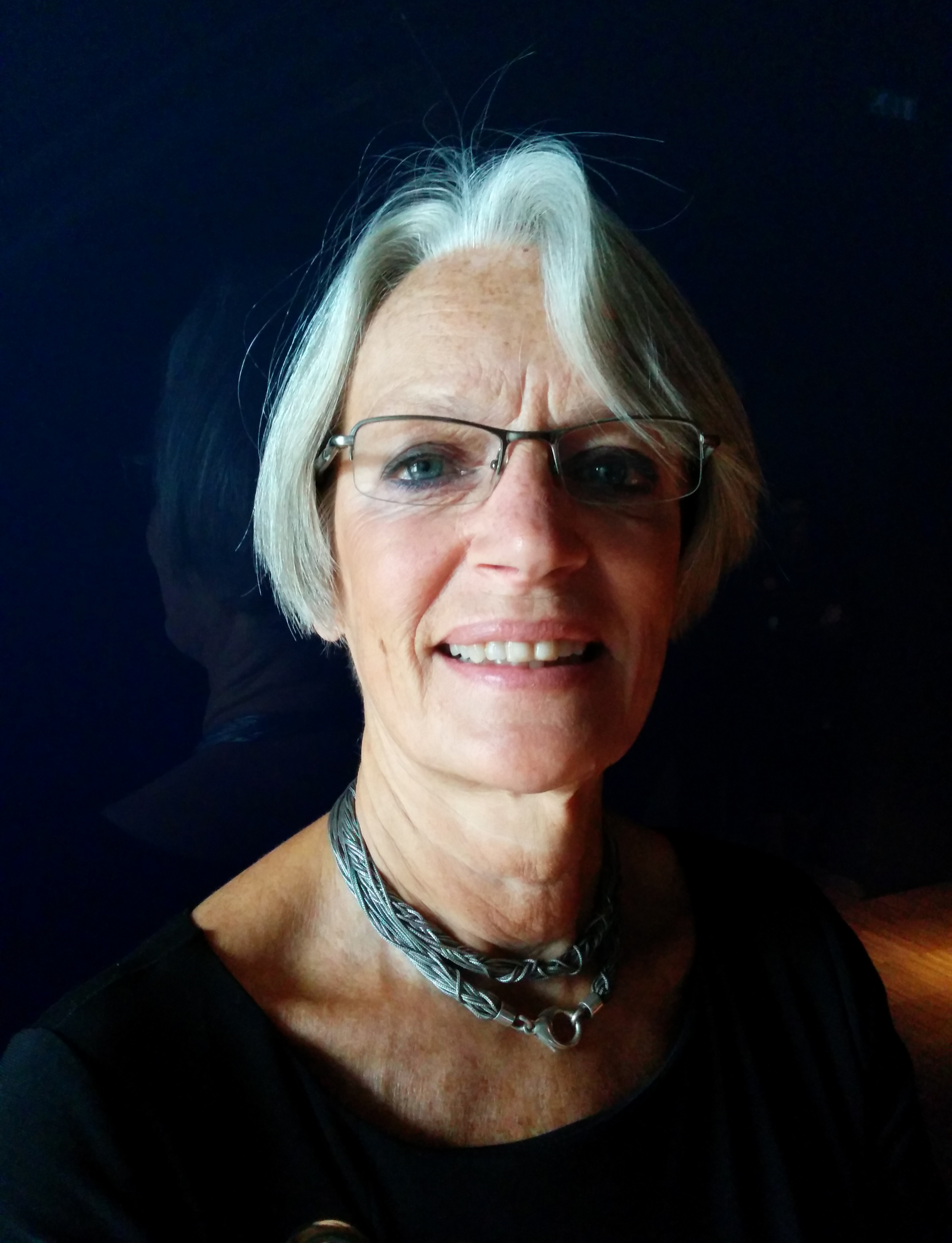
Bente Erichsen

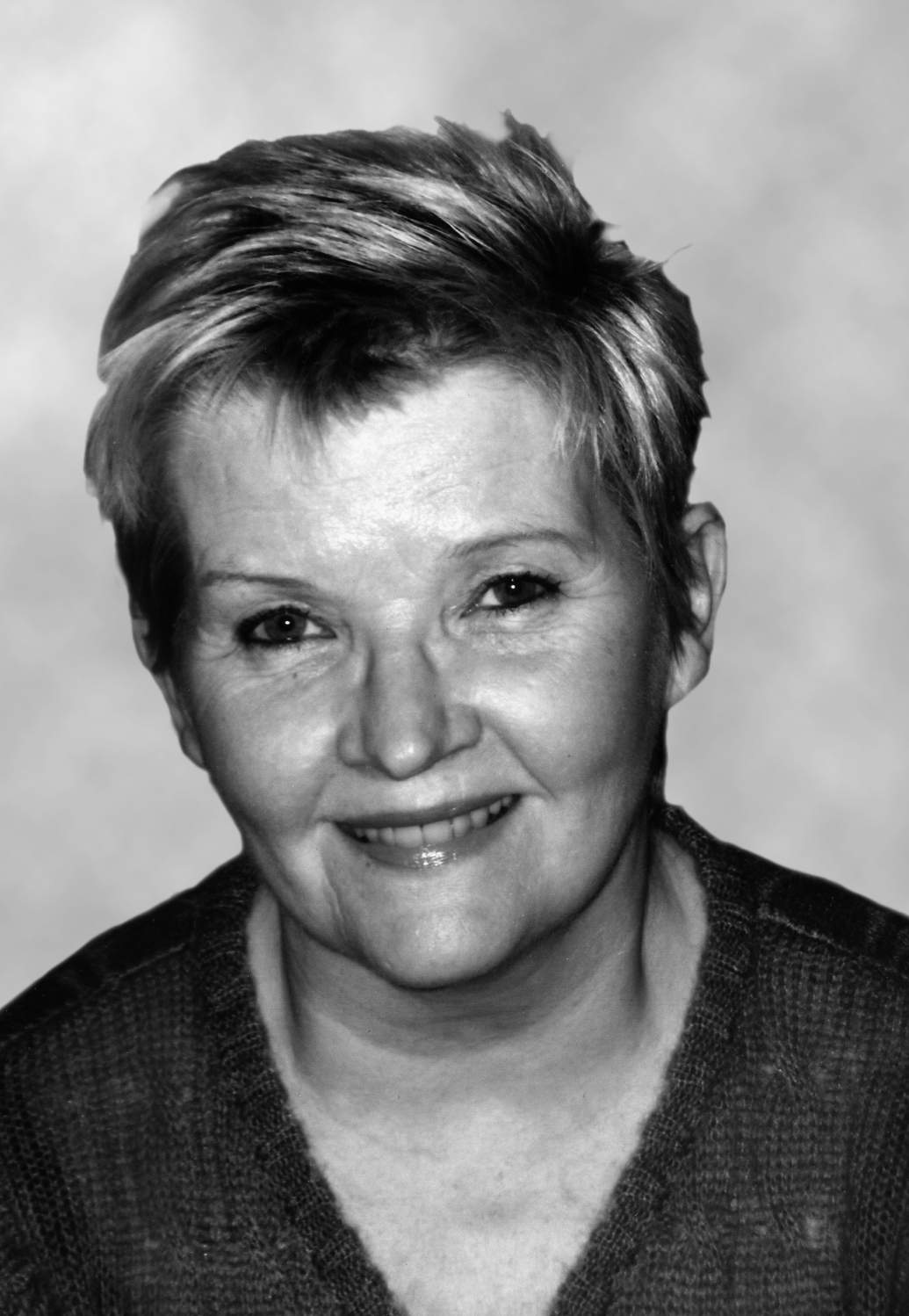
Hæge Follegg Pedersen

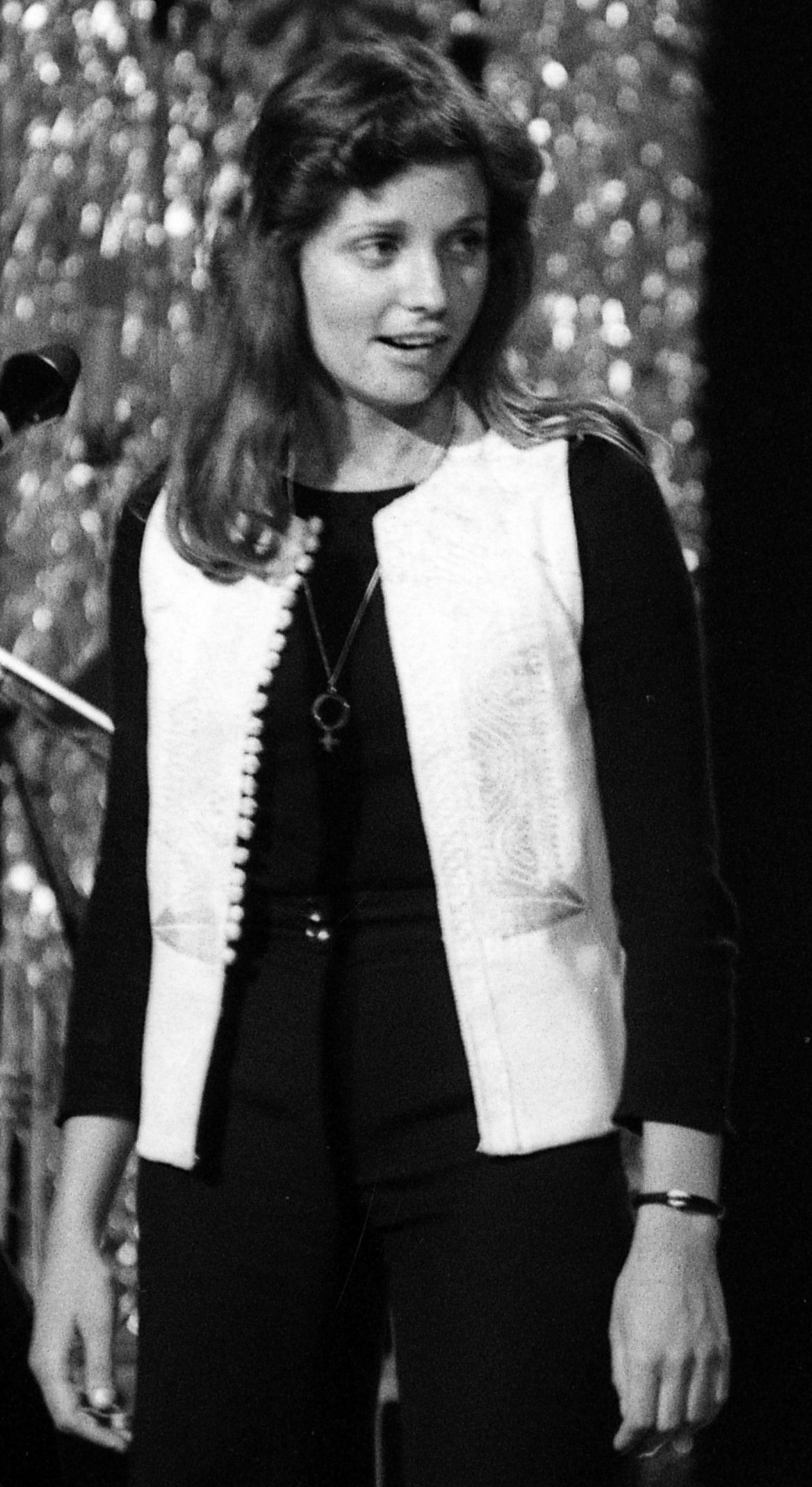
Inger Lise Rypdal

- 7 January – Bente Erichsen, culture director
- 25 January – Margaret Skjelbred, writer.
- 7 February – Oddvar Einarson, film director
- 22 March – Geirr Lystrup, musician and writer (died 2025).
- 2 April – Per Husby, jazz musician and orchestra leader
- 10 April – Ingolf Håkon Teigene, journalist and editor (died 2007)
- 29 April – Hæge Follegg Pedersen, children's writer.
- 3 May – Esben Esther Pirelli Benestad, doctor and sexologist
- 14 May – Sverre Årnes, novelist
- 19 May – Inga Kvalbukt, politician
- 30 May
  - Bjørn T. Grydeland, civil servant and diplomat
  - Ove Thorsheim, Norwegian diplomat
- 15 June – Erling Folkvord, politician (died 2024).
- 17 June – Bjørn Lofterød, sailor (died 2026).
- 20 June – Synnøve Korssjøen, goldsmith, jewellery designer.
- 6 July – Torunn Isberg, artistic gymnast (died 2026).
- 8 July – Jan Elvheim, politician (died 2019)
- 2 September – Knut Borge, journalist and entertainer (died 2017).
- 30 September – Lars Klevstrand, singer, guitarist, and composer.
- 8 November – Clement Endresen, judge
- 10 November – Aud Gaundal, politician
- 18 November – Sverre Diesen, military officer and Chief of Defence of Norway
- 18 November – Knut Magne Flølo, politician.
- 30 November – Petter Henriksen, musician and publisher.
- 6 December – Bjørn Hvinden, sociologist
- 9 December – Anne Enger, politician
- 14 December – Inger Lise Rypdal, singer and actress

== Notable deaths ==
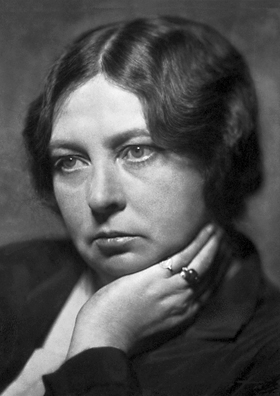
Sigrid Undset

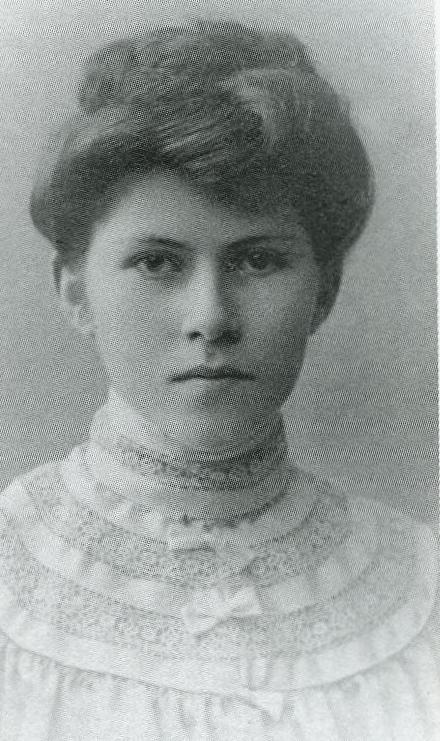
Ragnhild Kaarbø

- 25 January – Leon Aurdal, painter (born 1890).
- 5 February – Rudolf Elias Peersen, politician and Minister (born 1868)
- 14 February – Lise Stauri, educator (born 1882).
- 21 February – Anders Beer Wilse, photographer (born 1865)
- 2 June – Gudbrand Bernhardsen Tandberg, politician (born 1903)
- 10 June – Sigrid Undset, novelist, awarded the Nobel Prize in Literature in 1928 (born 1882)
- 12 July – Kirsten Utheim Toverud, pediatrician (born 1890).
- 13 July – Nils Tveit, politician (born 1876)
- 15 July – Erik Solem, judge (born 1877)
- 8 August – Eivind Kristoffer Eriksen, politician (born 1893)
- 20 August – Ragnhild Kaarbø, painter (born 1889).
- 8 October – Erik Ørvig, sailor and Olympic gold medallist (born 1895)
- 4 December – Ivar Lykke, politician and Prime Minister of Norway (born 1872)
- 22 December – Ole Reistad, military officer and pentathlete (born 1898).
