= Frisvold =

Frisvold is a surname. Notable people with the surname include:

- Erland Frisvold (1877–1971), Norwegian colonel, civil engineer and politician
- Paal Frisvold (born 1908) (1908–1997), Norwegian general
- Paal Frisvold (born 1962), Norwegian organizational leader and fencer
- Sigurd Frisvold (born 1947), Norwegian general
