= Kaarbø =

Kaarbø is a Norwegian surname. Notable people with the surname include:

- Ragnhild Kaarbø (1889–1949), Norwegian painter
- Rikard Kaarbø (1850–1901), Norwegian businessperson and politician
