= Erling Bauck =

Norwegian resistance member and writer

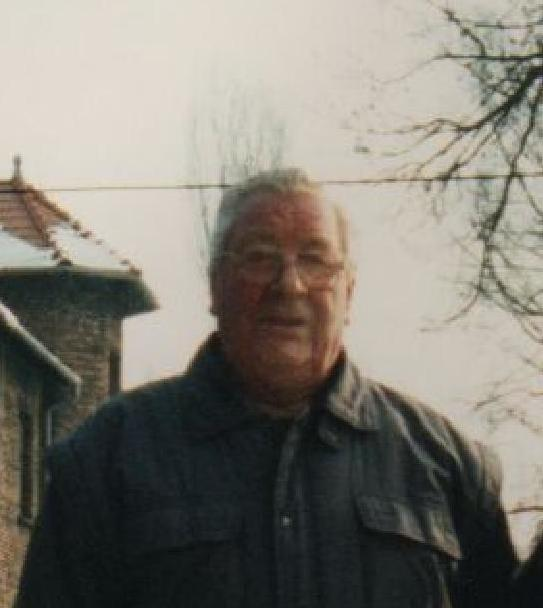
Erling Bauck

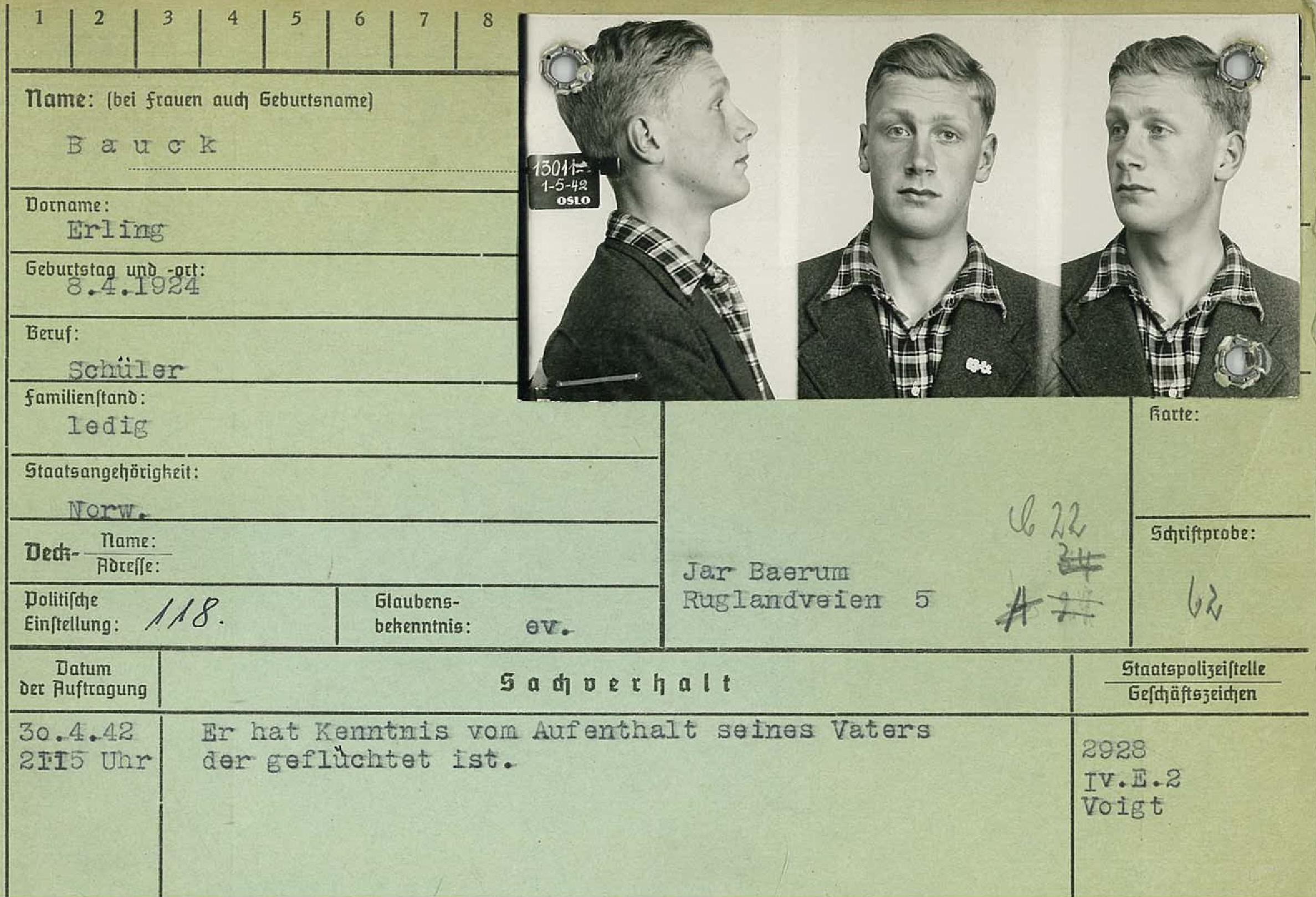
Prisoners pass of Erling Bauck in 1942

Swedish Red Cross White Buses, 1945

Erling Bauck (8 April 1924 – February 2004) was a Norwegian resistance member and writer. He was in Nazi captivity from 1942 to 1945 during World War II, first in Norway, then from 1944 in Auschwitz.

== War years ==
He was born in Mosjøen, Nordland but lived in Bærum in Akershus. Norway. He was arrested on 30 April 1942 and incarcerated in Møllergata 19 until 22 May 1943, then in Grini concentration camp until 29 July 1943. He was then transferred to Germany and was imprisoned in Hegerwelde and Sachsenhausen until January 1944, then Majdanek and Lublin before being in Birkenau/Auschwitz from 29 July 1944 to 18 January 1945. He was then imprisoned in Mauthausen, Melk and Dachau before being liberated. By war's end, he and thousands of other prisoners were forced to march westward in front of the Soviet thrust forward. He was rescued from imprisonment by the operation undertaken by the Swedish Red Cross and the Danish government in the spring of 1945 referred to as the White Buses (Hvite busser), which brought home several thousand prisoners from former concentration camps.

== Post-war years ==
In 1945 he wrote the book Men noen kom fra det to document his experiences in Nazi concentration camps. His book Du skal leve came out in 1979, and was a bestseller in 1980. The book builds on the experience described in Men noen kom fra det. Later he was very concerned with conveying facts about this period in Europe's history, including as a witness guide in the organization, White Buses to Auschwitz (Stiftelsen Hvite busser til Auschwitz). This is a Norwegian foundation that organizes travel for school students to former Nazi concentration camps.

== Family ==
Erling Bauck was a grandson of General Ivar Bauck, former Commanding General of the Norwegian Armed Forces.
