= Halvor Hansson =

Norwegian military officer (1886–1956)

Halvor Hansson (4 June 1886 – 1956) was a Norwegian military officer.

During the German occupation of Norway Hansson and Olaf Helset were given the task of performing military evaluation on behalf of Otto Ruge, who was then a prisoner-of-war. Their initiative is regarded as the startup of Milorg, the Norwegian military resistance organization. Hansson was arrested in January 1941. He was promoted Major General in 1945, and served as acting Chief of Defense of Norway in 1946.

His wife since 1915, Øyvor Hansson, turned out to be a Nasjonal Samling and Vidkun Quisling devotee; the couple were divorced.

Military offices
Preceded by Elias Corneliussen	Chief of Defence of Norway; 1946	Succeeded by Ole Berg
