= Ivar Bauck =

Norwegian general (1863–1937)

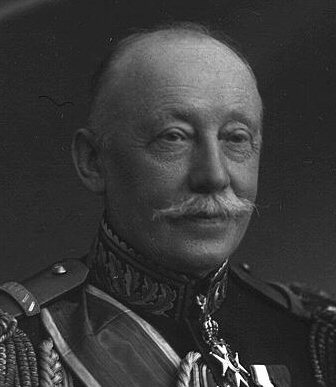
- Born: 12 February 1863; Trondheim, Norway
- Died: 1 November 1937 (aged 74)

Ivar Bauck (12 February 1863 – 1 November 1937) was a Norwegian four-star general known as a vocal opponent of the disarmament policies of successive Norwegian governments in the 1920s and 1930s.

He was born in Trondheim. He graduated from the Norwegian Military Academy at the top of his class in 1885. He pursued his higher military studies at the Norwegian Military College, graduating in 1888, again on top of his class.

In 1919, he reached the rank of major general and became Chief of the General Staff. From 1930 to 1931, he served as the Commanding General of Norway.

== Family ==
Ivar Bauck was the grandfather of Auschwitz survivor and bestselling author Erling Bauck.

Military offices
Preceded by Christian Theodor Holtfodt	Commanding General in Norway; 1930–1931	Succeeded by Kristian Laake
