= Vigleik Eide =

Norwegian diplomat and general

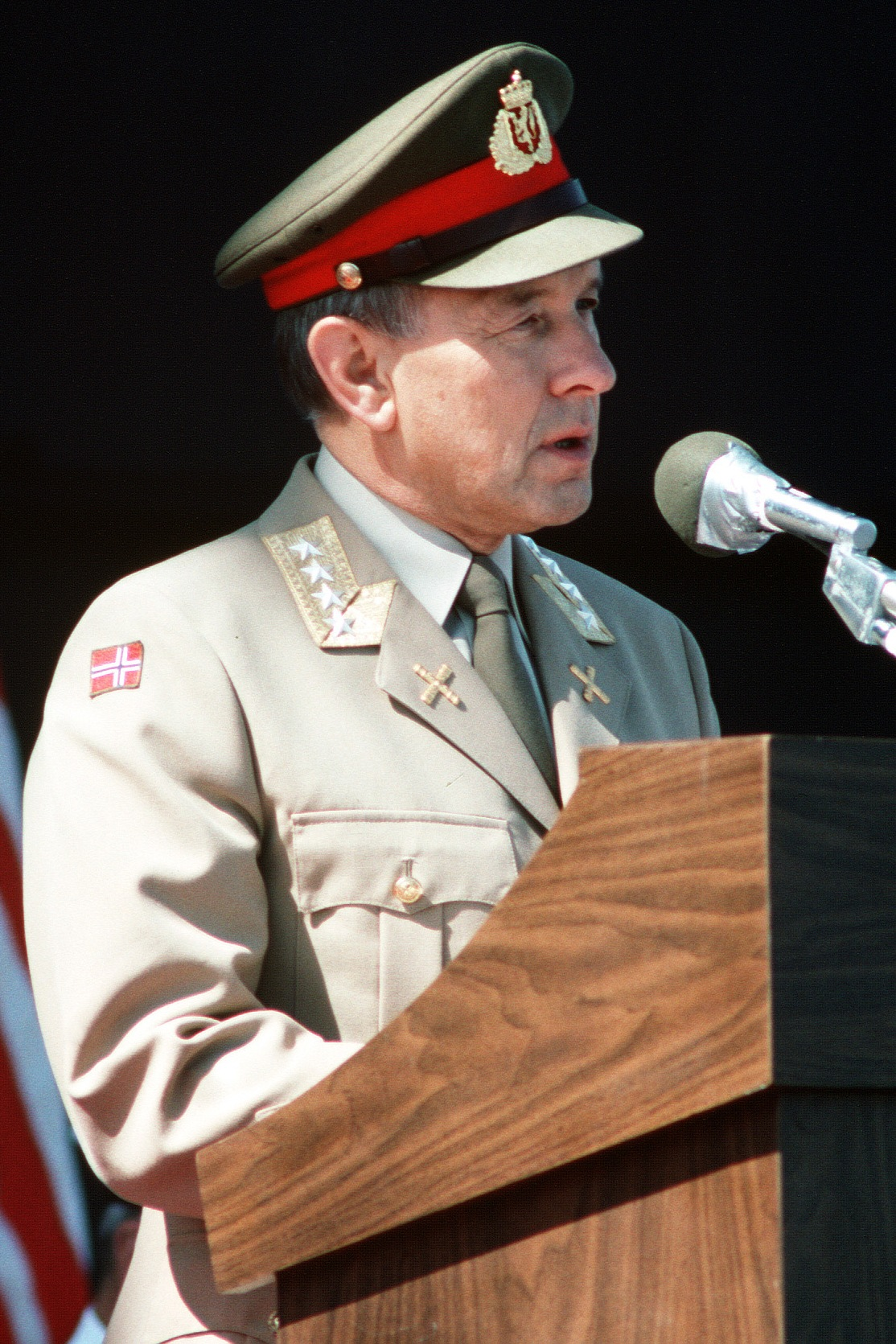
- Eide in 1990
- Born: 4 December 1933; Fana, Norway
- Died: 30 October 2011 (aged 77); Oppegård, Norway
- Military career
- Allegiance: Norway
- Branch: Norwegian Army
- Service years: 1954–1993
- Rank: General
- Awards: Royal Norwegian Order of St. Olav
- Other work: Ambassador to Lebanon and Syria

Vigleik Eide (4 December 1933 – 30 October 2011) was a Norwegian diplomat and military officer, a General in the Norwegian Army who served two years as Chief of Defence of Norway, and four years as Chairman of the NATO Military Committee.

== Personal life ==
Eide was born in Fana as the son of Ivar Vigleiksson Eide and Serina B. Oma. He married Aase Nyhuus in 1962. He died in October 2011.

== Career ==
Eide graduated from the Norwegian Military Academy in 1957, and later education included studies at the Führungsakademie der Bundeswehr and the NATO Defense College. He was a colonel in the Norwegian Army from 1980 to 1985. He was Major General and District Commander of Vestlandet from 1985 to 1986, and Lieutenant General and Head of Command of Northern Norway from 1986 to 1987. He served as Chief of Defence of Norway from 1987 to 1989. He served as Chairman of the NATO Military Committee from 1989 to 1993. During this period a closer cooperation between NATO and members of the Warsaw Pact was initiated.

From 1993 he had various international assignments, and participated in the peace negotiations in Guatemala in 1994, and in the former Yugoslavia from 1995 to 1996 (the Dayton Agreement). He was the Norwegian Ambassador to Lebanon and Syria from 1998 to 2001.

Eide was decorated Commander with Star of the Royal Norwegian Order of St. Olav in 1987. He also became a Grand Officer of the French National Order of Merit in 1989.

Military offices
Preceded by Fredrik Bull-Hansen	Chief of Defence of Norway; 1987–1989	Succeeded by Torolf Rein
Preceded by Wolfgang Altenburg	Chairman of the NATO Military Committee; 1989–1993	Succeeded by Richard Vincent, Baron Vincent of Coleshill
