= Folke Hauger Johannessen =

Norwegian admiral (1913–1997)

- Born: 2 December 1913; Gothenburg, Sweden
- Died: 17 April 1997 (aged 83)
- Occupation: Naval officer
- Awards: Order of St. Olav; Order of the Dannebrog; Order of the Lion of Finland; Order of the Sword; Legion of Merit

Folke Hauger Johannessen (2 December 1913 – 17 April 1997) was a Norwegian military officer, an admiral of the Royal Norwegian Navy. He served as Chief of Defence of Norway from 1964 to 1972.

During World War II he was the deputy commander and commander of several Norwegian destroyers and a chief of an Escort Group in Convoy Service for the Allies in the North Atlantic.

Hauger Johannessen was decorated with the Grand Cross of the Order of St. Olav in 1972. He received the Grand Cross of the Danish Order of the Dannebrog and the Order of the Lion of Finland. He was a Commander of the American Legion of Merit.

Military offices
Preceded by Bjarne Øen	Chief of Defence of Norway; 1964–1972	Succeeded by Herman Fredrik Zeiner-Gundersen
