= Herman Fredrik Zeiner-Gundersen =

Norwegian general, Chairman of NATO

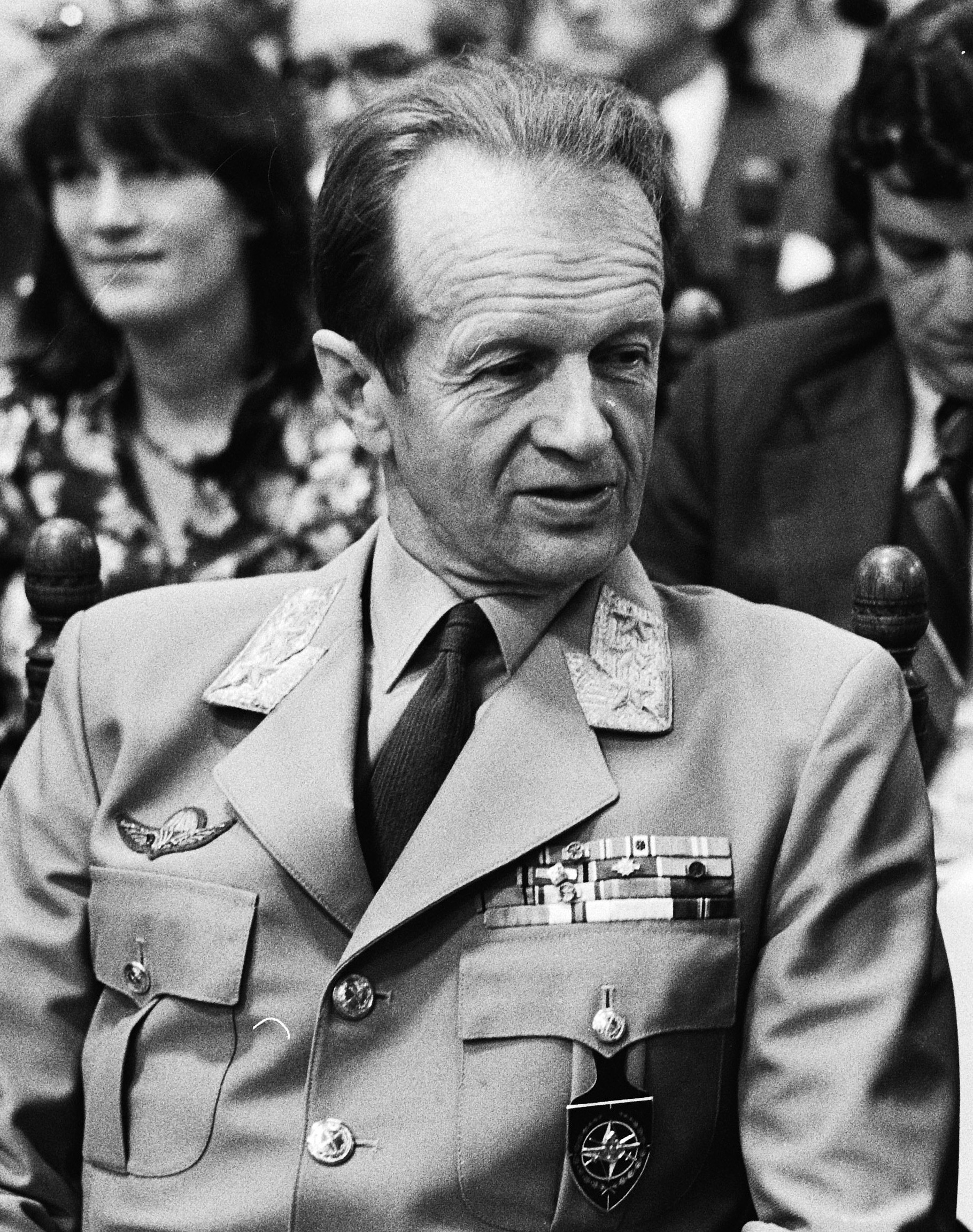
- Zeiner-Gundersen in 1979
- Born: 4 April 1915; Helsinki, Grand Duchy of Finland, Russian Empire (now Finland)
- Died: 13 October 2002 (aged 87) Bærum, Norway
- Allegiance: Norway
- Branch: Norwegian Army
- Rank: General
- Commands: Chief of Defence of Norway
- Conflicts: World War II: Norwegian Campaign
- Awards: Order of St. Olav

Herman Fredrik Zeiner-Gundersen (4 July 1915 – 13 October 2002) was a general in the Norwegian Army. He served as Chief of Defence of Norway from 1972 to 1977.

== Personal life ==
Zeiner-Gundersen was born in Helsinki, which was then part of the Russian Empire, to ship broker Herman Gundersen and Annette Zeiner-Henriksen, and grew up in Kristiania. He married Marit Pedersen in 1948. He resided at Blommenholm.

== Career ==
Zeiner-Gundersen was a veteran of World War II. He served as an artillery officer during the Norwegian Campaign in April 1940. After the Norwegian surrender to the Germans, Zeiner-Gundersen traveled in 1941 via Sweden, the Soviet Union and China to Canada. After a stay there he joined the Norwegian military mission in New York. In April 1942 he crossed the Atlantic Ocean to Britain and served with the artillery battery of the Norwegian Brigade in Scotland.

He was Chairman of the NATO Military Committee from 1977 to 1980.

Zeiner-Gundersen was decorated with the Grand Cross of the Royal Norwegian Order of St. Olav in 1977.

Military offices
Preceded by Folke Hauger Johannessen	Chief of Defence of Norway; 1972–1977	Succeeded by Sverre B. Hamre
