= Finn Lambrechts =

Norwegian military officer (1900–1956)

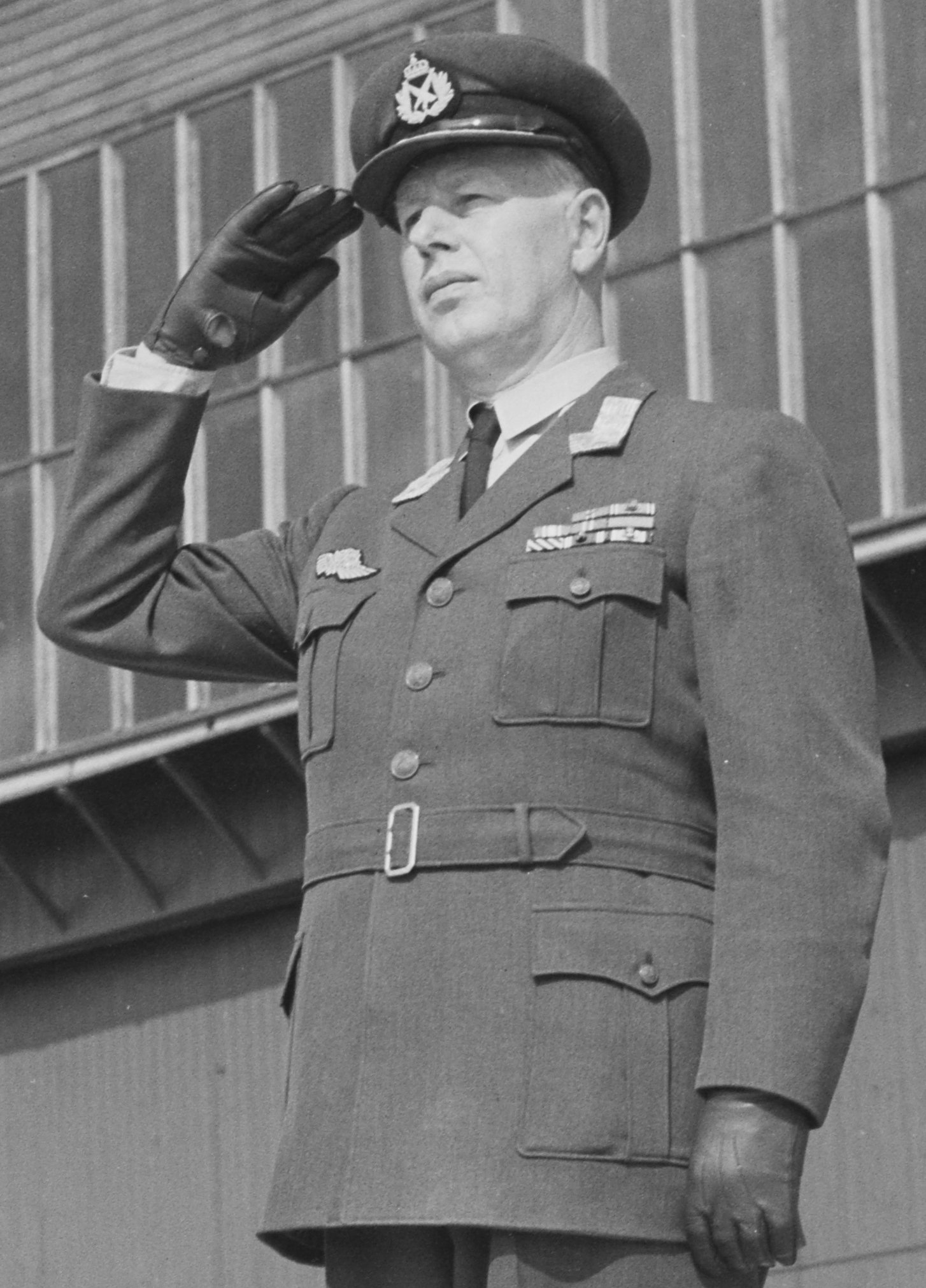
Lieutenant General Finn Lambrechts (1955)

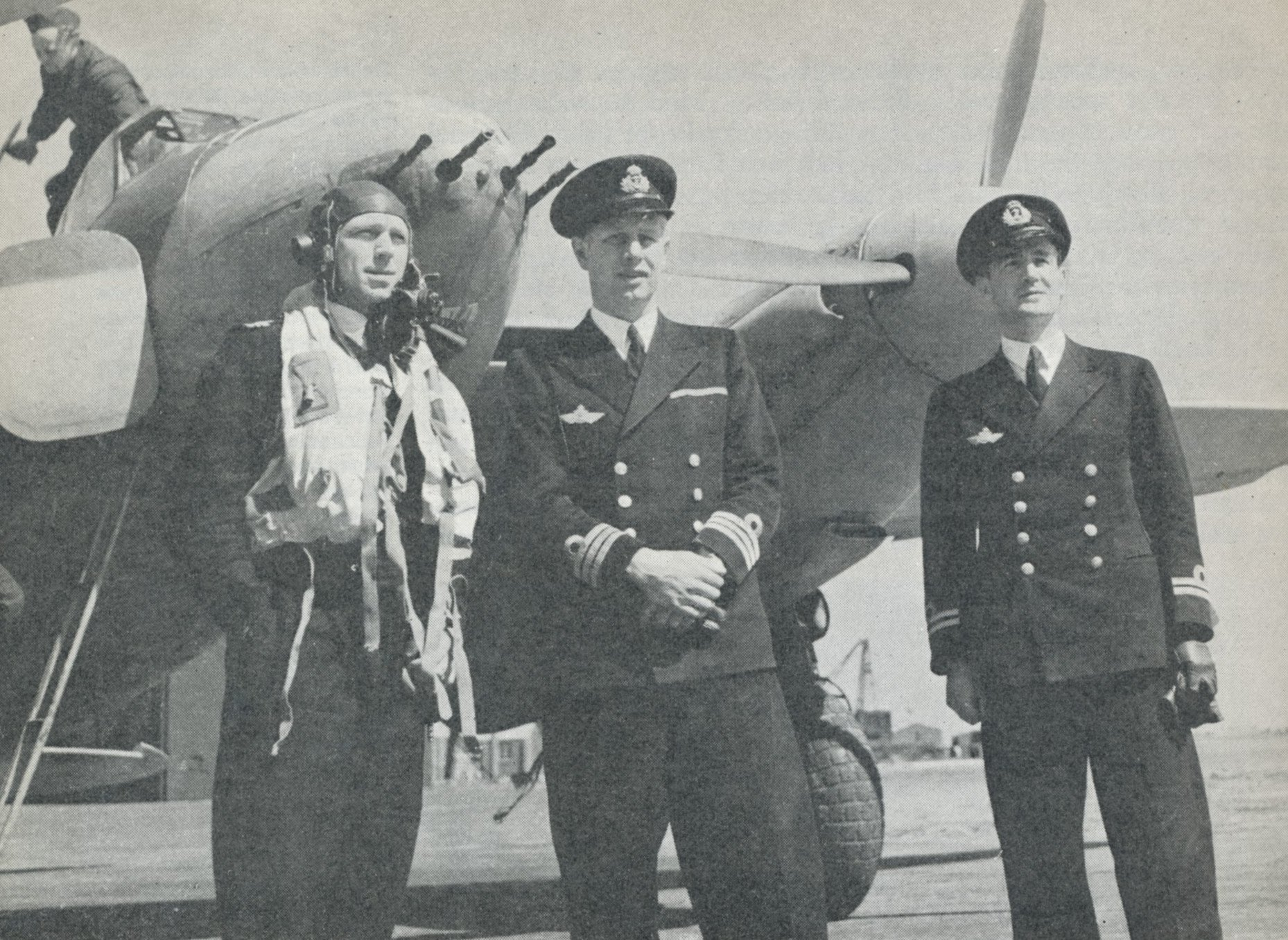
Lambrechts (second from the left) with fellow No. 333 Squadron RAF personnel

Finn Lambrechts DFC (16 June 1900 – 8 December 1956) was a Norwegian military officer, a lieutenant general of the Royal Norwegian Air Force. He served as Chief of Defence of Norway (Norwegian: sjef for Forsvarsstaben) from 1955 to 1956.

== Personal life ==
Lambrechts was born in Kristiania, the son of county manager Sigurd Lambrechts and Augusta Mowinckel. On 24 June 1929, he married Cuba-born Anita Brøgger.

== Career ==
=== Early career ===
Lambrechts graduated as naval officer in 1921, and from the navy's pilot school in 1924. He published the book Lærebok i luftnavigasjon in 1935, and worked as a pilot for the Norwegian Air Lines from 1935 to 1939.

=== Second World War ===
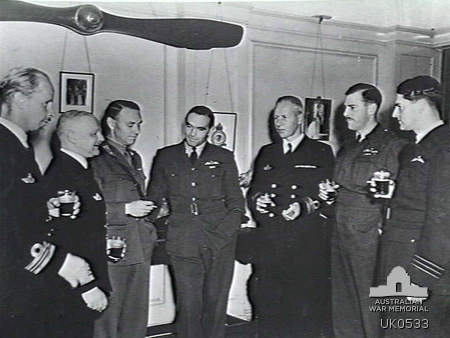
Lambrechts (no. 5 from the left) in Scotland in 1943

During the Second World War, he served as a pilot and aviation officer in Great Britain with the No. 333 Squadron RAF. He was pilot of the first operation using the amphibious aircraft Catalina to land agents on the Norwegian coast on 1 May 1942.

=== Post war ===
After the war, Lambrechts served as air attaché in Stockholm from 1945 to 1946. He was promoted to lieutenant general and head of the Royal Norwegian Air Force in 1951. From 1955 to 1956, he served as Chief of Defence of Norway (Norwegian: sjef for Forsvarsstaben).

== Honours and awards ==
Lambrechts was decorated Knight of the French Legion of Honour. He was awarded the Norwegian War Cross with Sword and the British Distinguished Flying Cross for achievements during the Second World War.

Military offices
Preceded by Ole Berg	Chief of Defence of Norway; 1955 - 1956	Succeeded by Bjarne Øen
