= Sven Hauge =

Norwegian military officer (1923–1997)

Sven Aage Hauge (29 December 1923 – 31 May 1997) was a Norwegian military officer, a General of the Royal Norwegian Air Force. He served as Chief of Defence of Norway from 1982 to 1984.

He was trained and graduated as a fighter pilot in Little Norway during World War II in Canada in 1944, and later he also graduated as a naval officer.

He was decorated as a Commander with Star of the Order of St. Olav in 1982.

Military offices
Preceded by Sverre B. Hamre	Chief of Defence of Norway; 1982–1984	Succeeded by Fredrik Bull-Hansen
