= Bjarne Øen =

Norwegian Air Force lieutenant general (1898–1994)

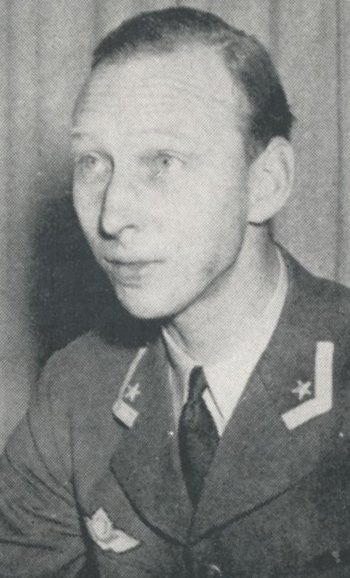
- Øen in 1943
- Born: 6 November 1898; Kristiania, Norway
- Died: 20 September 1994 (aged 95)
- Burial place: Vestre gravlund, Oslo
- Occupations: pilot; military officer; Chief of Defence of Norway
- Awards: (Norway) King's Medal of Merit in gold; (Norway) Order of St. Olav; (United States) Legion of Merit; (France) Légion d'honneur; (United Kingdom) Order of the British Empire

Bjarne Øen (6 November 1898 – 20 September 1994) was a Norwegian pilot, military officer and Lieutenant General of the Royal Norwegian Air Force. During World War II he played a central role in building up the Royal Norwegian Air Force in Canada and the United Kingdom. He served as Chief of Defence of Norway from 1957 to 1963.

== Biography ==
Adolf Bjarne Øen was born in Kristiania (now Oslo), Norway. He was the son of Ole O. Øen (1860–1927) and Marie Eline Stuve (1873–1964). He graduated from the Norwegian Military Academy in 1920, and from the Norwegian Military College in 1923. From 1923 to 1924, he was a student at Hæren Flight School, where he continued as an instructor until 1925. At the time of the start of World War II, Captain Øen was the airport manager of the newly opened Fornebu Airport outside Oslo.

After the Occupation of Norway by Nazi Germany in 1940, he was appointed temporary chief (General Inspector) for Norwegian Army Air Force. When the Norwegian Army Air Service training camp in southern Ontario (Little Norway) was opened November 1940, Øen was assigned to oversee training. When Ole Reistad arrived at the camp in 1941, Øen was transferred to London as chief of staff to Commander in Chief Hjalmar Riiser-Larsen. In 1942, Øen was promoted to Lieutenant Colonel.

The Royal Norwegian Air Force was established as a separate arm of the Norwegian armed forces in 1944. In January 1945 he conducted an inspection trip in Norway in preparation for the planned liberation of Norway. After the war, Lieutenant General Øen took over the position of Chief of the Air Force, a position he held for five years. After that he was in charge of the Royal Norwegian Air Force Academy for three years. He served as Chief of Defence of Norway (sjef for Forsvarsstaben) from 1957 to 1963.

== Honors ==
In 1929, Øen received the King's Medal of Merit (Kongens fortjenstmedalje) in gold. In 1947 he was awarded the title of Commander with Star of the Royal Norwegian Order of St. Olav, for his war contributions. Among foreign awards, he also received the American Legion of Merit, the French Légion d'honneur and was made an Honorary Commanders of the Order of the British Empire. He died during 1994 and was buried at Vestre gravlund in Oslo.

== Related reading ==
- Fredrik Meyer (1973) Hærens og marinens flyvåpen : 1912–1945 (Oslo: Gyldendal) ISBN 8205056080
- Per Conradi Hansen (2007) Little Norway, a message of Liberty to the Hills of home (Military Historical Foundation of Eastern Norway) ISBN 978-82-997663-0-2

Military offices
Preceded by Finn Lambrechts	Chief of Defence of Norway; 1957 – 1963	Succeeded by Folke Hauger Johannessen
