= Arne Solli =

Norwegian Army general

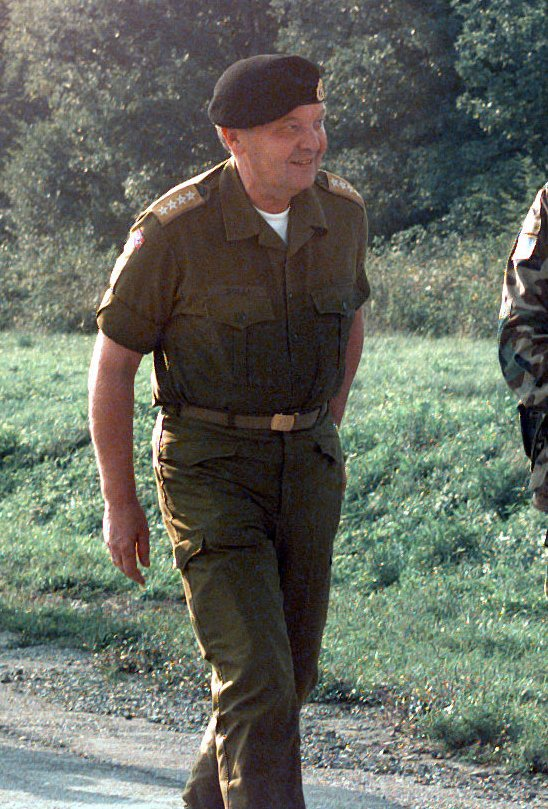
- Born: 6 April 1938; Molde, Norway
- Died: 20 September 2017 (aged 79)
- Allegiance: Norway
- Branch: Norwegian Army
- Rank: General

Arne Solli (6 April 1938 – 20 September 2017) was a Norwegian Army general who served as Chief of Defence of Norway (Forsvarssjef) from 31 October 1994 until 30 April 1999.

In 1995 he was awarded the title of Commander of the Royal Norwegian Order of St. Olav.

Military offices
| Preceded by Torolf Rein | Chief of Defence of Norway; 1994–1999 | Succeeded by Sigurd Frisvold |
