= Ole Berg =

Norwegian military officer

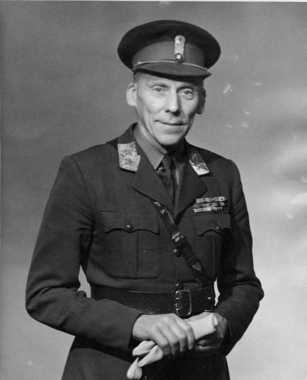
- Born: 7 October 1890
- Died: 23 September 1968 (aged 77)
- Occupation: Military Officer

Ole Berg (7 October 1890 – 23 September 1968) was a Norwegian military officer. He participated in the defence during the German invasion of Norway in 1940.

He built up the Norwegian police forces in Sweden from 1943 to 1945. He served as Chief of Defence of Norway (Norwegian: sjef for Forsvarsstaben) from 1946 to 1955. In 1947 he was awarded the title of Commander with Star of the Royal Norwegian Order of St. Olav.

Military offices
Preceded by Halvor Hansson	Chief of Defence of Norway; 1946–1955	Succeeded by Finn Lambrechts
