= Kristian Laake =

Norwegian military officer (1875–1950)

Kristian Kristiansen Laake
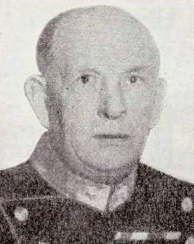
- Born: 9 April 1875; Ullensaker, Sweden-Norway
- Died: 3 August 1950 (aged 75)
- Spouse: Signe Henaug (m. 1901)
- Military career
- Allegiance: Norway
- Branch: Norwegian Army
- Service years: 1897–1940
- Rank: General
- Commands: Commanding General of the Norwegian Army (1931–1940)
- Conflicts: Second World War: Operation Weserübung
- Awards: Royal Norwegian Order of St. Olav (Commander with Star); Order of the White Rose of Finland (Grand Cross); Order of the Sword (Grand Cross); Order of the Dannebrog (Knighthood)

Kristian Kristiansen Laake (9 April 1875 – 3 August 1950) was a Norwegian military officer. He is best known for having commanded the Norwegian Army in the first days after the German invasion of Norway on 9 April 1940, and for being replaced because of what was seen by the leading Norwegian politicians as passive leadership.

== Early life and family ==
He was born in Ullensaker Municipality as a son of farmers Kristian Gulbrandsen Laake (1835–1875) and Karen Pedersen Taugland (1839–1903). His older brother Knut M. Laake, a cavalry officer, became a politician and activist, and Kristian Laake joined the Liberal Party as well.

On 24 September 1901, Laake married a farmer's daughter Signe Henaug (28 November 1879 – 8 January 1960) who was from Nes Municipality in Akershus. The couple had three children, and in 1908 they acquired the farm Stalsberg in Skedsmo Municipality, Akershus. One of their daughters married entomologist Leif Reinhardt Natvig.

== Military career ==
He finished his secondary education in 1894 and graduated from the Norwegian Military Academy in 1897 and the Norwegian Military College in 1900. He served in the artillery, and reached the rank of colonel in 1928. Laake commanded the 3rd Artillery Regiment in 1928-1929, and then the 1st Artillery Regiment from 1929. He spent April–May 1929 with the 2nd Prussian Artillery Regiment in Germany. In 1931 he was appointed as the Commanding General of Norway. He received the Royal Norwegian Order of St. Olav in 1934, and held the Order of the White Rose of Finland (Grand Cross), the Order of the Sword (Grand Cross) and the Order of the Dannebrog (Knighthood).

== Becoming Commanding General ==
The appointment on 6 February 1931 of Kristian Laake as Commanding General of the Norwegian Army was a controversial one. The preceding Commanding General, Ivar Bauck, reached the age limit for Commanding Generals on 12 February of that year. When the Liberal Party cabinet appointed Laake, it was generally viewed as a political move to enable the cabinet to push through reforms of the Norwegian Army. A member of the Liberal Party himself, Laake fully expressed full support for the politicians as they reduced the budgets for the Norwegian armed forces. The general had taken part in shaping the party's new reduced-size army plans, which his predecessor had opposed vigorously. In Laake's opinion it was vital for soldiers to loyally accept the decisions of the politicians in all respects. Laake's appointment was also criticized because of his lack of previous service on the general staff. Laake had only served in the general staff until 1912, at that time holding the rank of adjoint, the second lowest officer's rank in the general staff. It was almost unheard of that an officer with such limited general staff experience should be appointed commanding general.

== Internal security issues ==
During Laake's first years as Commanding General the issue of the army's preparations to deal with possible revolutions came up. At the time the Norwegian minister of defence was the future fascist collaborator Vidkun Quisling. Quisling saw internal troubles and revolutionary activities as a clear and present threat to the state, and on several occasions in the summer of 1931 employed the military to assist the police forces. Laake disagreed with Quisling's views on the social and political stability of Norway, and repeatedly opposed and delayed the defence minister's internal security measures.

Among the anti-revolutionary measures that Laake opposed was blocking industrial labourers from serving in the Norwegian Royal Guards. At the time, both conservative and left-wing organizations were providing non-governmental military training for volunteers. Laake attended exercises held by the conservative organizations, although he was also criticized by the same organizations for not giving them enough support.

In 1932 Laake opposed vague instructions from Quisling that units from paramilitary organization should be mobilized in times of crisis, and requested direct and clear orders as to which units this would include, and from which organizations. The implication was that Quisling wanted the conservative Samfundsvernet to be given an open, contra-revolutionary role as units separate from the army. Laake instead suggested that those members of voluntary organizations who had a military background would be mobilized, while those without formal ties to the military would not. In this case, Laake was overruled by Quisling and the Ministry of Defence.

During the same time, Quisling was working on plans for a coup, using paramilitaries to seize power. Quisling wanted to bypass Laake in this regard, as he suspected that the general would refuse to cooperate. After months of planning, Quisling's coup plans did not come to fruition and the cabinet in which he served lost power in 1933.

During the 1930s the Norwegian Army was often troubled by anti-military protesters, both from outside and within its own ranks of conscripts. General Laake saw it as very important for the status of the military to arrest such agitators and hand them over to the police for prosecution, even though the protesters were rarely convicted in court. The army continued to have a counter-revolutionary function, and as late as November 1937 Laake approved the inclusion of mountain artillery in the units in Western Norway which were designated to deal with internal troubles. He did, however, refuse to allow air support to be used for possible internal security operations. Only in 1938 did the army begin to scale down its preparations to put down a revolution. The process of dismantling the anti-revolution preparations in the Norwegian Army began in 1936, and was founded to end the fears of the establishment of a revolution led by the Norwegian Labour Party. Laake was considered a moderate amongst the military in this regard.

== Second World War ==
On 9 April 1940 Norway was invaded by Nazi Germany. Laake was perceived as too passive by the political leadership, and he was asked to resign on 10 April. He stepped down on 11 April.

=== Prelude ===
Following the outbreak of the Second World War in 1939, Laake had repeatedly warned the Norwegian authorities of the possibility that the war could reach Norway in a sudden manner. In the first months of the war, the Norwegian Army Air Service's fighter flight Jagevingen had orders not to fire at intruding aircraft. This order was changed by General Laake on 5 March 1940 and Norwegian Gloster Gladiator fighter aircraft were given the task of preventing intrusion into Norwegian airspace by aircraft belonging to the warring parties. Laake gave the Norwegian fighter pilots permission to use force if necessary to ward off intruders. Before the outbreak of war, Laake had been one of a number of prominent Norwegians to support giving Neville Chamberlain the Nobel Peace Prize for negotiating the Munich Agreement with Nazi Germany in September 1938.

On 8 April 1940, after the British had announced that they had laid three naval mine fields along the Norwegian coast to force German shipping out of neutral Norwegian waters, Laake and the general staff contacted minister Ljungberg and suggested mobilizing the Norwegian Army. The most wide-ranging of the suggestions involved mobilizing significant forces in southern and western Norway. Defence Minister Birger Ljungberg then advised the government to postpone the decision to the next day. The same day that the British mine fields had been laid, the Polish submarine ORP Orzeł sank the German ship Rio de Janeiro that was carrying troops and war matériel off the southern Norwegian port of Lillesand. The British mine fields, however, overshadowed this news.

Although many alarming incidents were taking place in the days leading up to the invasion, no orders came through from the politicians, and Laake preferred to wait passively for orders rather than act, believing the government to be relying on better intelligence than he had access to. Only on 8 April did he suggest a partial mobilization. Three days earlier, on 5 April, Laake had been among some 200 prominent Norwegians to attend a party held at the German legation in Oslo. At the party, the Germans had shown their guests from the political and military elites of Norway a dramatic propaganda film about their conquest of Poland the year before. On the evening of 8 April, Laake boarded a train that brought him to his farm near Strømmen, east of Oslo, where he was to celebrate his 65th birthday on 9 April 1940.

=== War ===
At 2330 hours Laake was warned by chief of the general staff Rasmus Hatledal that foreign warships were intruding on Norwegian territorial waters. Before Laake could get back to Oslo minister of defence Ljungberg, the latter had left the general staff's offices to attend a cabinet meeting. The top officers of the Norwegian Army were gathering at the general staff in Oslo. In the early hours of 9 April 1940, Hatledal repeatedly attempted to get in contact with defence minister Ljungberg, and confusion reigned in the general staff as no orders from the politicians came. No attempts were made by the general staff at preparing for mobilization by warning the telegraph offices, the Norwegian Broadcasting Corporation, or the newspapers. General Laake was of the opinion that it served no purpose to prepare for mobilization, as the mobilization itself would take at least three days to carry out in any case. The situation remained uncertain, with no declarations of war from Germany.

Defence minister Ljungberg had informed the military leadership of the government's decision to mobilize at around 0200hrs on 9 April. Both Laake and the general staff understood the orders from Ljungberg to entail a partial and silent mobilization. This led to much confusion amongst both the military and the civilian population. At the same time, minister of foreign affairs Halvdan Koht was reported to have said that orders for a general mobilization had been issued.

Laake reached minister Ljungberg by telephone at 0200hrs and discussed mobilizing the army. Laake suggested mobilizing the 1st to the 4th Brigades of the army, meaning most of the forces ready for mobilization in Eastern, Southern and Western Norway. This was the most wide-ranging of the mobilization alternatives that Laake had proposed on 8 April. Ljungberg quickly received approval from the government, and relayed the message to Laake. The government had agreed with a mobilization and left it to the military to decide on the details. After the telephone conversation, an argument quickly broke out between Laake and Hatledal. Hatledal viewed the mobilization in question was inadequate and wanted a total and open mobilization, rather than the silent and partial mobilization by mail that Laake was organizing. Laake stated that if Hatledal wanted an open mobilization then he could discuss it with minister Ljungberg when the minister arrived at the general staff at Akershus Fortress.

In the end, Hatledal went against orders and declared 11 April as the first mobilization day, instead of 12 April. The chief of the general staff also expanded the mobilization from 24,000 men to 38,000 and included Trøndelag in the mobilization area. Hatledal did not disobey orders to the extent that he carried out a total mobilization, which would have involved 100,000 soldiers, or make the mobilization an open one. The Norwegian Broadcasting Corporation and the newspapers were left out of the system. No mobilization posters were posted. Meanwhile, General Laake had returned to his farm at Strømmen to retrieve his toiletries. He left his uniform and military effects with his subordinates.

During much of 9 April 1940, the Norwegian armed forces were left leaderless at the top levels, the general staff having evacuated Oslo, and General Laake stuck at Strømmen without his uniform while he was waiting for a taxi to pick him up at his farm. When a taxi finally arrived and brought him to Slemdal, the general staff had already evacuated to Eidsvoll without making arrangements for Laake's transport. Laake duly walked to the nearby Slemdal station and took the Holmenkoll Line to Majorstuen to find a taxi. Having failed again in finding transport, Laake made his way to Norges Geografiske Oppmåling to try and see if they had a car to lend him. When it was concluded that they did not have a car for him, Laake went to Oslo East Station, to find that the rail service was still functioning. Laake managed to board a train and make his way out of Oslo to rejoin the general staff. The General finally succeeded in finding the general staff, and set up a headquarters in the town of Rena

The confusion that reigned after the German invasion led to delays in Norwegian countermeasures. At 1500hrs on 10 April, Laake and the general staff met with minister of justice Terje Wold. During the meeting, Laake expressed his pessimistic views on the resistance against the invasion, and his disappointment at the government's decision to end negotiations with the Germans. In Laake's view, negotiations were Norway's alternative to an unconditional surrender. The Commanding General also expressed his disappointment at the lack of communication from the government. Minister Wold reacted fiercely to Laake's statements, criticising the general for not having issued orders to his troops and for not carrying out a general mobilization. Laake rebutted by stating that all he had and had not done was in accordance with the government's wishes. The General was of the opinion that the negotiations could not be called off until it was clear whether or not allied help was actually coming.

Following the meeting, the government decided, based on Wold's report, to replace Laake. He was called to Nybergsund, where he offered to resign. His resignation was approved and General Otto Ruge, seven years younger than Laake, was appointed as commanding general. Ruge was optimistic that at least Trondheim could be recaptured from the Germans once Allied help arrived.

Before the meeting in Nybergsund, Laake did not suspect that he was to be replaced, and believed he was going to give the government a briefing on the military situation. The government explained Laake's resignation to the public by referring to the mandatory retirement age of generals at 65 years of age. However, as Commanding General, Laake was exempted from this regulation, only being required to retire at age 68.

After his resignation, Laake held a short meeting with his successor Ruge at Rena and left the area. Rasmus Hatledal, chief of the general staff, immediately requested sick leave when he heard of the dismissal of Laake, but was persuaded to stay a few days longer to help Ruge in his new position.

== Post-war life ==
Laake resided at the Stalsberg farm in Skedsmo Municipality from 1908 to his death.

Laake testified against Vidkun Quisling at the latter's post-war trial, telling the court about Quisling's attempts to disrupt the Norwegian mobilization after the German invasion on 9 April 1940.

== Bibliography ==
- Agøy, Nils Ivar (1997). Militæretaten og "den indre fiende" fra 1905 til 1940: hemmelige sikkerhetsstyrker i Norge sett i et skandinavisk perspektiv (in Norwegian). Oslo: Faculty of History and Philosophy, University of Oslo. ISBN 82-00-22805-3.
- Bjørnsen, Bjørn (1977). Det utrolige døgnet (in Norwegian). Oslo: Gyldendal Norsk Forlag. ISBN 82-05-10553-7.
- Dahl, Hans Fredrik (1992). Vidkun Quisling. En fører for fall (in Norwegian). Oslo: Aschehoug. ISBN 82-03-16960-0.
- Fjørtoft, Kjell (1990). Ulvetiden: krig og samarbeid (in Norwegian). Oslo: Gyldendal Norsk Forlag. ISBN 82-05-18437-2.
- Fure, Odd-Bjørn (1996). Mellomkrigstid: 1920–1940 (in Norwegian). ISBN 82-00-22534-8.
- Guhnfeldt, Cato (1990). Fornebu 9. april (in Norwegian). Oslo: Wings. ISBN 82-992194-1-8.
- Voksø, Per (1994). Krigens Dagbok – Norge 1940–1945 (in Norwegian). Oslo: Forlaget Det Beste. ISBN 82-7010-245-8.

Military offices
Preceded by Ivar Bauck	Commanding General in Norway; 1931–1940	Succeeded by Otto Ruge
