= Haakon Bruun-Hanssen =

Admiral in the Norwegian navy

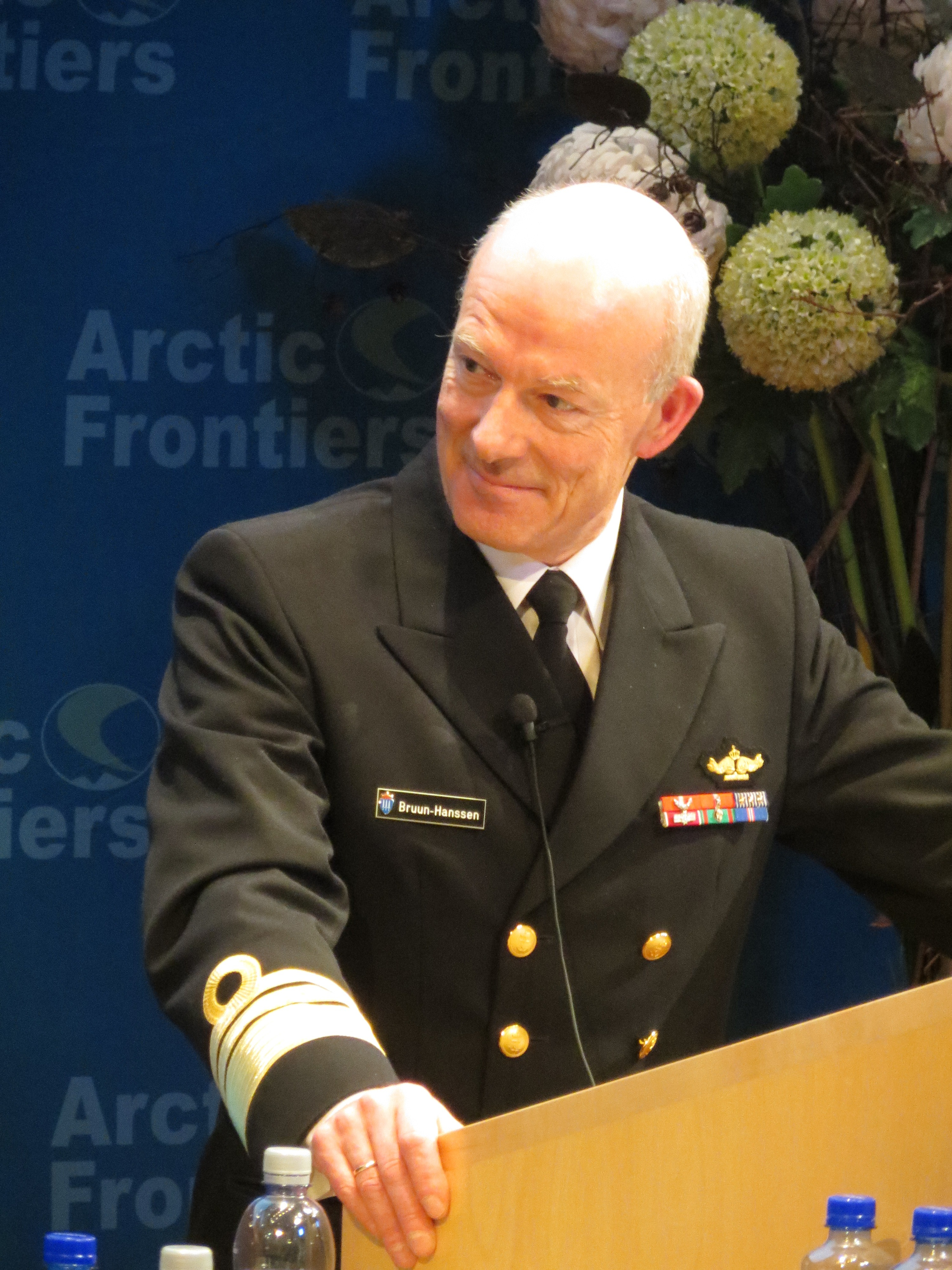
- Bruun-Hanssen in 2013
- Born: Haakon Stephen Bruun-Hanssen; 8 July 1960 (age 66); Bergen, Norway
- Military career
- Allegiance: Norway
- Branch: Royal Norwegian Navy
- Service years: 1980–2020
- Rank: Admiral
- Commands: Commanding officer of Kobben; Commanding officer of Utstein; Chief of Naval Operation Centre; Inspector General of the navy; Chief of the Armed Forces Joint Headquarters; Chief of Defence
- Awards: Defence Service Medal with Laurel Branch; Legion of Merit; Order of Merit of the Italian Republic

Haakon Stephen Bruun-Hanssen (born 8 July 1960, in Bergen) is a Norwegian officer with the rank of admiral and Inspector General of the Navy. He was appointed head of the operational headquarters of the Norwegian Armed Forces and Chief of Defence from 2013 to 2020. He retired in August 2020, and Eirik Kristoffersen was appointed as his replacement.

== Military career ==
In 1980, Bruun-Hanssen started his military career with an officer course at KNM Harald Haarfarge and in 1981 he graduated as a second lieutenant after completion of Officer School of the Norwegian Navy. He studied at the Naval Academy in Laksevaag 1983. From 1987 to 1995 he served in the Submarine branch. From 1991 he served as commanding officer on the submarines Kobben of the Kobben class and Utstein of the Ula class. He has completed Naval Staff College, 1st Class, Dutch Staff College 2nd class, and all Total Defense courses at the Defence Academy.

Haakon Bruun-Hanssen has been a staff officer at the Naval staff, and worked at Strategic plan office at the same place. In the years 2003-06 he was chief of the Naval operation centre at the Armed Forces' joint operational headquarters in Jåtta in Stavanger. From 2006 to 2008 Bruun-Hanssen served as Chief of Staff of the Naval Staff, later as the Inspector General of the Navy. In 2011 Haakon Bruun-Hanssen was appointed to the post of Chief of the Armed Forces Joint Headquarters in Bodø. He has never participated in actual combat, but has been in staff management for Norwegian military units in combat. 21 June 2013, he was appointed Chief of Defence. He succeeded General Harald Sunde in the autumn of 2013, after Sunde retired as chief of defence a few months before the end of his term and retirement. At the announcement of Bruun-Hanssen's appointment, Bruun-Hanssen stated that he would continue the renewal of the defense forces in the same direction as done in the last ten years. Bruun-Hanssen was at the appointment the first Chief of Defence from the Navy since 1994, when Admiral Torolf Rein stepped down as Chief of Defence after five years. In 2013, there were five applicants for the position. He assumed office 19 November 2013.

== Awards ==
Bruun-Hanssen holds The Defence Service Medal with Laurel Branch, Defence Medal with one star and The Royal Norwegian Navy's Prowess Medal with three stars. In 2009 Bruun-Hanssen was appointed Grand Officer of the Order of Merit of the Italian Republic. In April 2011 Bruun-Hanssen was awarded the American decoration Legion of Merit.

Military offices
Preceded by Harald Sunde	Chief of Defence of Norway; 2013-2020	Succeeded by Eirik Kristoffersen
