= Harald Sunde (general) =

Norwegian military officer

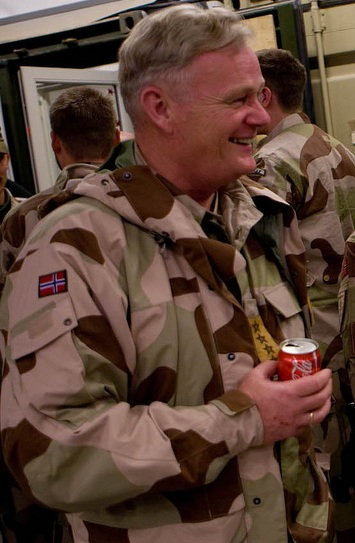
- Sunde in Afghanistan
- Born: 9 March 1954 (age 72); Hurdal, Norway
- Military career
- Allegiance: Norway
- Branch: Norwegian Army
- Rank: General
- Commands: Chief of Defence Chief of National Joint Headquarters

Harald Sunde (born 9 March 1954 in Hurdal) is a Norwegian military officer. He has served as the head of the Norwegian Armed Forces from 1 October 2009 through November 2013.

Military offices
| Preceded by Sverre Diesen | Chief of Defence of Norway; 2009–2013 | Succeeded by Haakon Bruun-Hanssen |
