= Torolf Rein =

Norwegian military officer

- Born: 20 October 1934 (age 91); Fusa Municipality, Norway
- Military career
- Allegiance: Norway
- Branch: Royal Norwegian Navy
- Service years: 1953–1994
- Rank: Admiral

Torolf Rein (born 20 October 1934) is a Norwegian military officer, an admiral of the Royal Norwegian Navy. He served as Chief of Defence of Norway from 1989 to 1994.

Military offices
Preceded by Vigleik Eide	Chief of Defence of Norway; 1989–1994	Succeeded by Arne Solli
