= Fredrik Bull-Hansen =

Norwegian military officer (1927–2018)

- Born: 2 August 1927; Skien, Norway
- Died: 1 March 2018 (aged 90); Oslo, Norway
- Occupations: Military officer General
- Awards: Legion of Merit; Order of St. Olav; Order of the White Rose; Order of the Polar Star

Fredrik Bull-Hansen (2 August 1927 – 1 March 2018) was a Norwegian military officer, a General in the Norwegian Army. He served as Chief of Defence of Norway from 1984 to 1987.

Bull-Hansen was decorated Commander with Star of the Royal Norwegian Order of St. Olav in 1984. He received the Grand Cross of the Finnish Order of the White Rose and the Swedish Order of the Polar Star. Commander with Star of the Order of St. Olav. Among his other honours are the Grand Cross with Star of the Order of Merit of the Federal Republic of Germany and Commander of the Legion of Merit.

Military offices
Preceded by Sven Hauge	Chief of Defence of Norway; 1984–1987	Succeeded by Vigleik Eide
