= Nils Selmer Hauff =

Norwegian bookseller

Nils Selmer Hauff (27 February 1882 – 1963) was a Norwegian bookseller.

He was born in Drøbak in Akershus county, Norway. He started his career working for Jacob Dybwad in Kristiania, but opened his own bookstore in 1911. He chaired the Norwegian Booksellers Association from 1927 to 1936 and 1946 to 1950. In the 1910 census for Norway he is listed as a Muslim; in 1900 he is listed as belonging to the Church of Norway but also, improbably, as an "office woman" (kontor-dame) under the heading "occupation". He was also involved in arts patronage.
