= Elias Corneliussen =

Norwegian military officer (1881–1951)

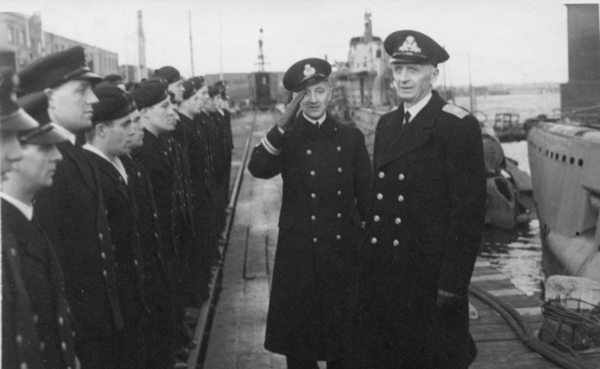
- Elias Corneliussen (right) in 1941
- Born: 3 August 1881; Kristiania, Norway
- Died: 5 April 1951 (aged 69); Tønsberg
- Occupation: Naval officer
- Awards: Order of St. Olav; Order of the Bath; Legion of Honour

Elias Corneliussen, KCB (3 August 1881 – 5 April 1951) was a Norwegian military officer and an admiral of the Royal Norwegian Navy. He served as acting Chief of Defence of Norway from January to May 1946.

== Biography ==
Corneliussen was born in Kristiania (now Oslo), Norway on 3 August 1881. He was the son of Andreas Martin Corneliussen (1852–1916) and Clara Thinn (1856–1936).

He entered the Norwegian naval service in 1905. He served with the Naval Board of the Ministry of Defense (1909–13) and with the Royal Norwegian Naval Academy (1913–22). Corneliussen was Head of the Admiral Staff (1934–37) and Chief (1937–40). He was a higher Norwegian naval officer during World War II. In June 1940 he arrived in the UK, where he became a Rear admiral and the chief of the Royal Norwegian Navy in 1941.

Corneliussen was decorated Commander with Star of the Royal Norwegian Order of St. Olav in 1948. He was a Commander of the British Order of the Bath, and or the French Legion of Honour.

Corneliussen died in Tønsberg on 5 April 1951.

Military offices
Preceded by Otto Ruge	Chief of Defence of Norway; 1946	Succeeded by Halvor Hansson
