= Sverre B. Hamre =

Norwegian general and Chief of Defence of Norway

Sverre Ludvig Borgund Hamre (19 October 1918 – 15 May 1990) was a Norwegian general.

He was born in Bergen, and graduated from military academy in London in 1943. He was dispatched to continental Europe where he took part in the D-day and the battles in Western Europe. He reached the ranks of colonel in 1965, major general in 1972 and general in 1977. He headed Forsyningsstaben from 1965 to 1967, then the material department in the Ministry of Defence from 1967 to 1974. He was the commander-in-chief in Northern Norway from 1974 to 1977 and Chief of Defence of Norway from 1977 to 1982. He was decorated as a Commander with Star of the Order of St. Olav in 1977.

Military offices
Preceded by Herman Fredrik Zeiner-Gundersen	Chief of Defence of Norway; 1977–1982	Succeeded by Sven Hauge
