= Øyvor Hansson =

Norwegian politician

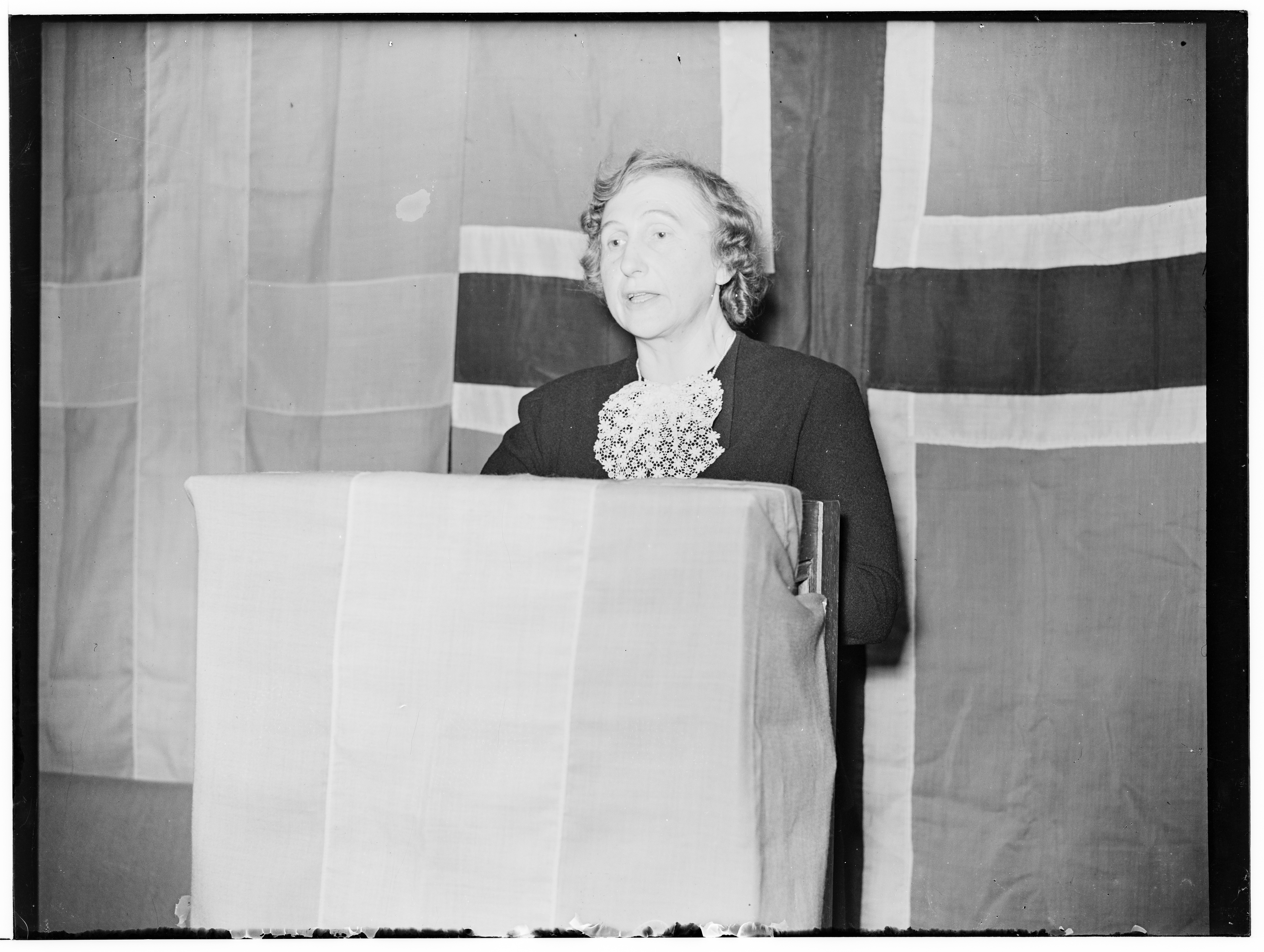
UI 198Fo30141702150017 NSK Nasjonal Samlings Kvinneorganisasjon (NTBs krigsarkiv, Riksarkivet, digitalarkivet.no)

Øyvor Hansson, née Styren (3 March 1893 – 1975) was a Norwegian politician for Nasjonal Samling.

She co-founded the Nasjonal Samling's Women's Organisation. She started out as secretary under Marie Irgens before serving as leader from 1935 to 1941, when succeeded by Olga Bjoner. She was highly supportive of Vidkun Quisling during the party's in-fighting in the 1930s, and for the 1936 Norwegian parliamentary election she was placed third on the party ballot in Oslo headed by Quisling.

During the remainder of the occupation of Norway by Nazi Germany, from 1942 to 1945, she worked as an assistant secretary in the Ministry of Social Affairs. She died in 1975.

She was a daughter of treasurer M. H. Styren (1846–1917) and Inga, née Johannessen (1866–). From 1915 she was married to General Halvor Hansson, who turned out to be a highly decorated member of the resistance to German rule and the Nasjonal Samling authorities. The couple were divorced.
