= Erling Kristvik =

Norwegian educationalist (1882–1969)

Erling Kristvik (30 August 1882 – 9 January 1969) was a Norwegian educationalist. Kristvik was born in Kornstad. He served as rector at the School of education in Volda from 1930 to 1946. He was appointed professor at the Norwegian College of Teaching in Trondheim from 1946 to 1952. Among his books are Læraryrket (1925), Sjelelære (1937) and Elevkunne (1939).
