= Bjørn Hvinden =

Norwegian sociologist (born 1949)

Bjørn Hvinden (born 6 December 1949) is a Norwegian sociologist. He is a research professor and managing director of Norwegian Social Research.

He has formerly been director of the Nordic Centre of Excellence in Welfare Research "Reassessing the Nordic Welfare Model", a cooperation between universities and research institutions in all the Nordic countries. He was Professor of Sociology at the Norwegian University of Science and Technology from 1995 to 2007. His research fields are social policy, disability and international migration.

He has been a visiting professor/visiting scholar at the universities in Edinburgh, Umeå, Helsinki, Bremen and Uppsala. He was elected a member of the Royal Norwegian Society of Sciences and Letters in 2006.

== Publications ==
- Citizenship in Nordic Welfare States. Dynamics of choice, duties and participation in a changing Europe, 2007
- Nordic welfare states in the European context, 2001
- Virker velferdsstaten?, 2001
- Romanifolket og det norske samfunnet, 2001
- Nordic Social Policy, 1999
