= Lise Stauri =

Norwegian high school teacher

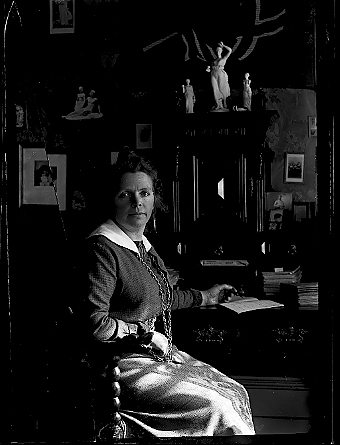
Photographer : H.H.Lie

Lise Karine Stauri, née Høie (6 January 1882 – 14 February 1949) was a Norwegian folk high school teacher.

She was born in Stavanger as a daughter of Unitarian priest and school manager Rasmus Høie (1833–1909) and Lise Tjøstheim (1846–1891); through her sister she was a sister-in-law of Oddmund Vik. Her father managed Stavanger Seminary, but as this was disestablished in 1901 she moved to attend Seljord Folk High School. Here she met one of the teachers, Rasmus Stauri (1867–1932), whom she married in August 1907.

Before that, they worked together at the new Gudbrandsdal Folk High School from 1902. Lise also studied gymnastics in Denmark, finally graduated from Elverum Teachers' Seminary in 1904, worked as a teacher in Vats, Buøy and Stavanger and finished additional teacher courses in Kristiania in 1907. In 1907 she returned to Gudbrandsdal Folk High School, which in 1915 was moved from Kvam to Hundorp.

The folk high school became a cultural centre in Gudbrandsdal. The Stauri couple invited prominent academics to hold lectures there, and held international teacher courses from 1908 with 250 attendants. Foreningen Norden also centred their activities here. Outside of the school, Lise Stauri was active in Noregs Ungdomslag, chaired the local Women's Public Health Association branch from 1926 to 1928, and founded and chaired Gudbrandsdal Housewives' Association in 1929. She was also a national board member of the Norwegian Housewives' Association.

Rasmus Stauri died in 1932, and Lise Stauri managed Gudbrandsdal Folk High School from 1932 to 1948. Their son Erik Are Stauri took over. In 1947 she was awarded the King's Medal of Merit in gold. She died in February 1949 in Hundorp.
