= Rikard Kaarbø =

Norwegian businessperson and politician

- Born: 22 May 1850; Trondenes, Norway
- Died: 3 March 1901 (aged 50)
- Occupations: Businessperson; Politician
- Known for: Founder of Harstad
- Children: Ragnhild Kaarbø
- Relatives: Paal Frisvold (grandson)

Rikard Olai Kaarbø (22 May 1850 – 3 March 1901) was a Norwegian businessperson and politician.

== Personal life ==
Rikard Olai Wilhelmsen Kaarbø was born in the parish of Trondenes in Troms, Norway to Wilhelm Olssøn Kaarbø (1811–1876) and Martine Mikaline Kildal (1828–1903). In 1875, he married Anna Elisabeth Lund. They were the parents of thirteen children. Among their children were the painter Ragnhild Kaarbø. Another daughter, Valdis Kaarbø, married Erland Frisvold who served as mayor of Harstad. Their son was General Paal Frisvold, who was head of the Norwegian Army.

== Career ==
He is associated with the establishment of the town of Harstad on the island of Hinnøya. He founded several businesses and fostered development of the local shipping industry. The city population increased from about 60 to 1,100 between 1876 and 1900. Harstad largely developed around his quay, packhouse and brewery.

In 1887, he initiated the foundation of the city's first newspaper, Senjens Tidende (now Harstad Tidende) and the establishment of phone company Harstad Telefonkompani in 1891. In 1888, he was a co-founder of the steamship company, Haalogalands Dampskibsselskab with headquarters in Harstad. The company continued in operation until entering bankruptcy in 1930. In 1895, he founded the mechanical workshop Harstad mekaniske Verksted, later to be knows as Kaarbøs Mek. Verksted A/S. In 1899, he founded a street gas lighting company, Harstad Acetylengassværk.

In 1893, he became chairman of the Harstad city commission. He served as mayor of Trondenes Municipality from 1883 until his death in 1901.
