= Hæge Follegg Pedersen =

Norwegian writer

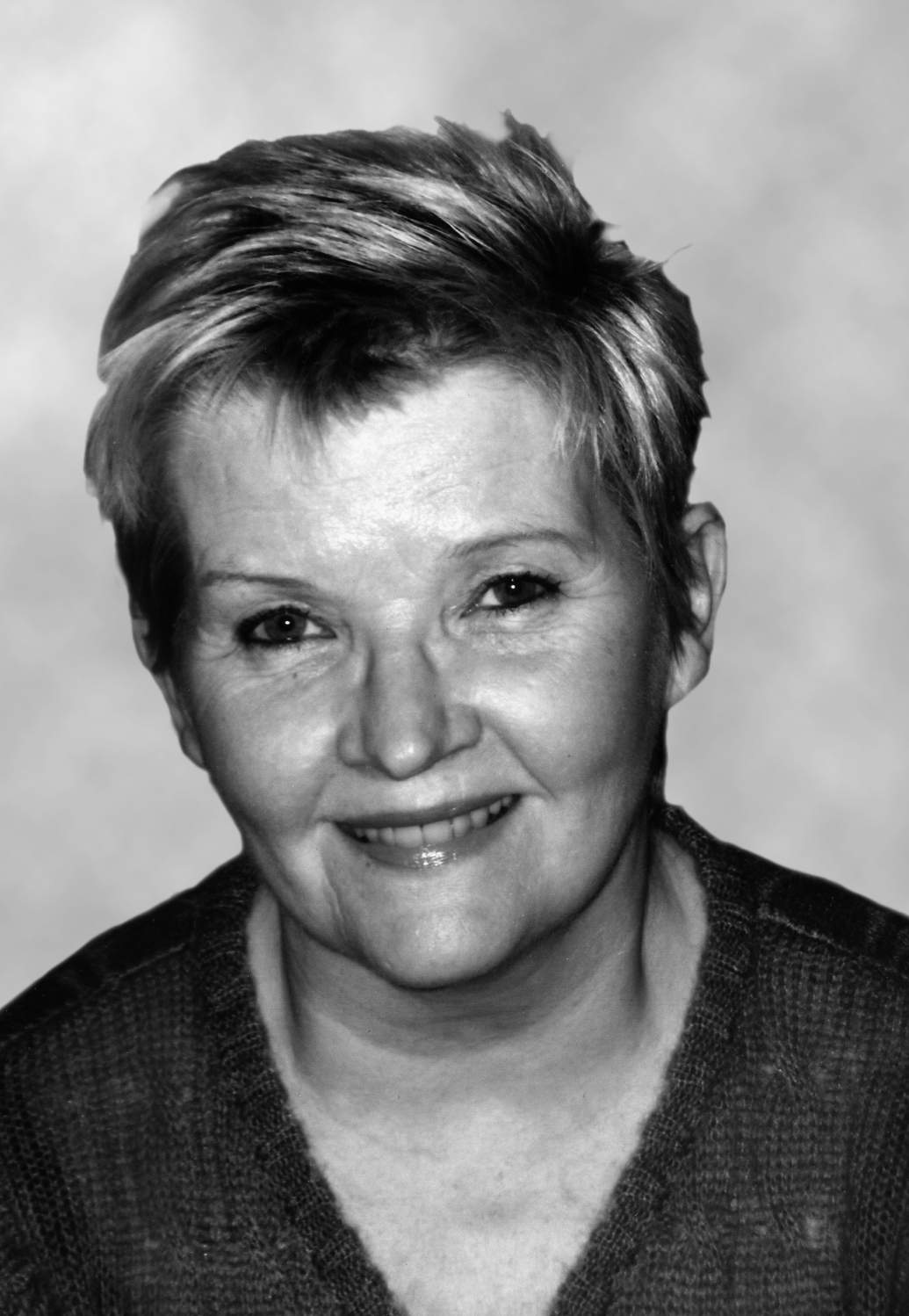
- Born: 29 April 1949 (age 76); Skien, Norway
- Occupation: Writer

Hæge Follegg Pedersen (born 29 April 1949) is a Norwegian writer for children and young adults.

She resides in Skien, Telemark, where she grew up. She made her literary debut in 1984 with the children's book Under en grønn himmel. Her next children's books are Fanget i et englehus from 1985, and Med stjerner i håret (1987). Her first book for young adults is Venner i regn from 1988, followed by Sommergjesten (1989) and Glassenglene (1990). Further books are Kjæresten i skogen from 1992, and the children's book Englefuglen (1993). Her next six books for young adults are Hvor som helst er ingen steder (1995), Ikke helt aleine (1998), Du slipper ikke unna (2000), Veit du hvem jeg er? (2002), Skorpionen (2006), and Game Over (2007).

Her books have been translated into several languages, including Danish, Faroese and German. She was awarded the Riksmål Society Prize for Children's and Young Adults' Literature in 1989.
