= Otto Ruge =

Norwegian general (1882–1961)

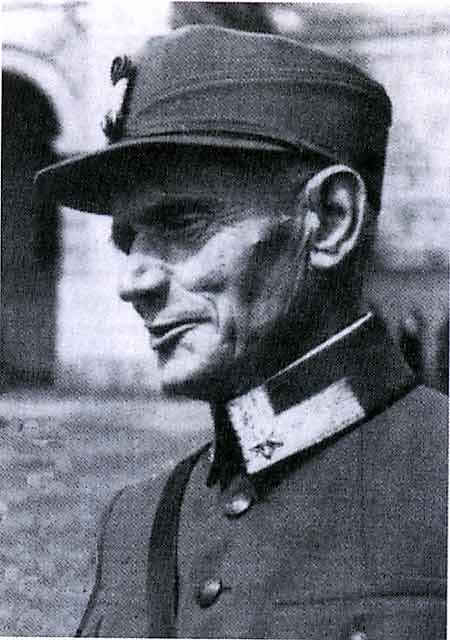
- Generalmajor Otto Ruge in the summer of 1945
- Born: 9 January 1882; Kristiania, Sweden-Norway
- Died: 15 August 1961 (aged 79) Oslo, Norway
- Allegiance: Norway
- Branch: Norwegian Army
- Service years: 1902–1948
- Rank: General
- Commands: Chief of Defence of Norway
- Conflicts: World War II: Norwegian Campaign
- Awards: incomplete (Norway) Royal Norwegian Order of St. Olav Grand cross with collar

Otto Ruge (9 January 1882 – 15 August 1961) was a Norwegian general. Ruge was Commander-in-chief of the Royal Norwegian Armed Forces after Nazi Germany's assault on Norway in April 1940.

== Early career ==
Ruge grew up in Kristiania (Oslo) in a family with strong military traditions. He attended Oslo Cathedral School. At only 20 years old, he was a military officer. He attended the Norwegian Military College (1905) and took the General Staff exam (1915). Colonel Otto Ruge became chief of the General Staff in 1933. In 1938 he resigned from the position and was appointed as inspector general of infantry.

== World War II ==
In 1940, Colonel Ruge was promoted to major general and assumed command after the former commander-in-chief, Generalmajor Kristian Laake, who was supposed to go into retirement a few days after the German attack on Norway, displayed a defeatist attitude and consequently was relieved of command. General Ruge persuaded the government to fight the German invaders. He was convinced that fighting would be vital to the country and the nation's self-respect, but pragmatic enough to realize that a need for Allied help was crucial to succeed. Ruge had a hard task on his hands: he received command over an only partly mobilised army. Norway had already lost all major cities to the Germans, moreover the Germans had established air superiority. The loss of one of the few infantry regiments available, the Norwegian third infantry regiment (its commander surrendering without a shot being fired, falsely believing that he was surrounded), made the situation even worse.

Ruge's main strategy was to slowly retreat northward and to establish a defence line south of Trondheim while waiting for the Allies to reconquer that city. However, the Allies launched their pincers toward Trondheim too late, and too far away from their destination. As a result of this several of the pincer forces became entangled in combat before the attack against the city could be launched.

== Evaluation of strategy ==
Ruge's choices have later been criticised. Retired Major General Torkel Hovland claims that General Ruge to a large degree was responsible for the ease with which German forces were able to occupy Norway. This was partly due to his appeasement with the Labor party and their razing of the Norwegian Army during the 1930s and partly due to his failure to mount a more active, determined defense in central Norway.

However, other military historians have contested these views; including Terje Holm and Kjetil Skogrand, both with ties to the Norwegian Labour Party. Terje Holm at the Norwegian Armed Forces Museum claims that the Norwegian Mobilization Army had the necessary arms, but that the Army never became mobilized because of misunderstandings and the surprise of the German attack, and that the ad hoc nature of the randomly mobilized Norwegian units drastically hampered their operations as well as their ability to counterattack. Kjetil Skogrand, former State Secretary at the Ministry of Foreign Affairs, perceived Hovland's criticism of Ruge as comments on present-day Norwegian defence policies than related to Otto Ruge's actual strategies. Skogrand has also criticized Hovland for comparing General Carl Gustav Fleischer's more active fighting style around Narvik with Ruge's more defensive style further south. Fleischer, because of northern Norway's geographical distance from Germany, is seen as enjoying the advantage of more time to train and mobilise his forces, and being less disturbed by the Luftwaffe.

Partially in contrast to what Terje Holm as well as Torkel Hovland claim, military historian Tom Kristiansen emphasizes that even though Otto Ruge participated in the downsizing of the Norwegian Army during the early 1930s, he also warned against the renewed threat after 1935 and pointed to the weakness of the Norwegian mobilization system.

Ruge was evacuated after the fall of southern Norway and participated in the Battle of Narvik. After the withdrawal of Allied forces he remained in Norway to negotiate the surrender of the remaining Norwegian Army. Subsequently, he was arrested by the Germans and sent to Germany for the rest of the war.

== Post World-War II ==
After the war, Ruge was promoted to Lt. General and briefly reinstated as Commander-in-Chief, but fell out with his political superiors. His memoirs from the 1940 campaign was published in Norway under the title Felttoget 1940. General Otto Ruge was appointed a Knight Grand Cross of the Royal Norwegian Order of St. Olav and awarded the Collar of the same order for his service to the nation during World War II. He was also given the residence of the commandant quarters of Høytorp fort at Mysen in Østfold until his death in 1961.

== Awards and honors ==
- Knight Grand Cross of the Order of St. Olav - Norway
- Order of Dannebrog - Denmark
- Order of the Sword - Sweden
- Legion of Honor - France
- Bronze Star Medal - United States of America
- Knight's Cross of the Order of Virtuti Militari - Poland

== Selected works ==
- Felttoget: General Otto Ruges erindringer fra kampene april-juni 1940 (1989)
- Annen Verdenskrig i tekst og billeder: Krigens Dagbok (Volumes I, II & III) (1946–1948)
- Flyvning og stormaktspolitikk, i Internasjonal Politikk (1938)

== Other sources ==
- Hovland, Torkel (2008) Aldri mer? (Kolofon Forlag) ISBN 978-82-300-0429-6
- Hobson, Rolf; Tom Kristiansen (2001) Norsk forsvarshistorie - Bind 1: 1905-1940 - Total krig, nøytralitet og politisk splittelse (Bergen : Eide Forlag)

Military offices
Preceded by new post	Chief of Defence of Norway; 1940	Succeeded by post vacant
Preceded by Crown Prince Olav	Chief of Defence of Norway; 1945–1946	Succeeded by Elias Corneliussen
