= Ove Thorsheim =

Norwegian diplomat

Ove Thorsheim (born 30 May 1949) is a Norwegian diplomat.

Thorsheim holds a cand.philol.

Thorsheim began for the Norwegian Ministry of Foreign Affairs in 1979. He was the Norwegian ambassador to Australia from 2000 to 2005 and South Africa from 2005 to 2007. After a period serving as deputy under-secretary of state in the Ministry of Foreign Affairs from 2007 to 2011, Thorsheim was appointed as ambassador to Portugal in 2011.

== Honours ==
- Portugal: Grand Cross of the Order of Prince Henry (26 May 2008)
- Portugal: Grand Cross of the Order of Merit (14 May 2017)
