= Sverre Diesen =

Norwegian military officer

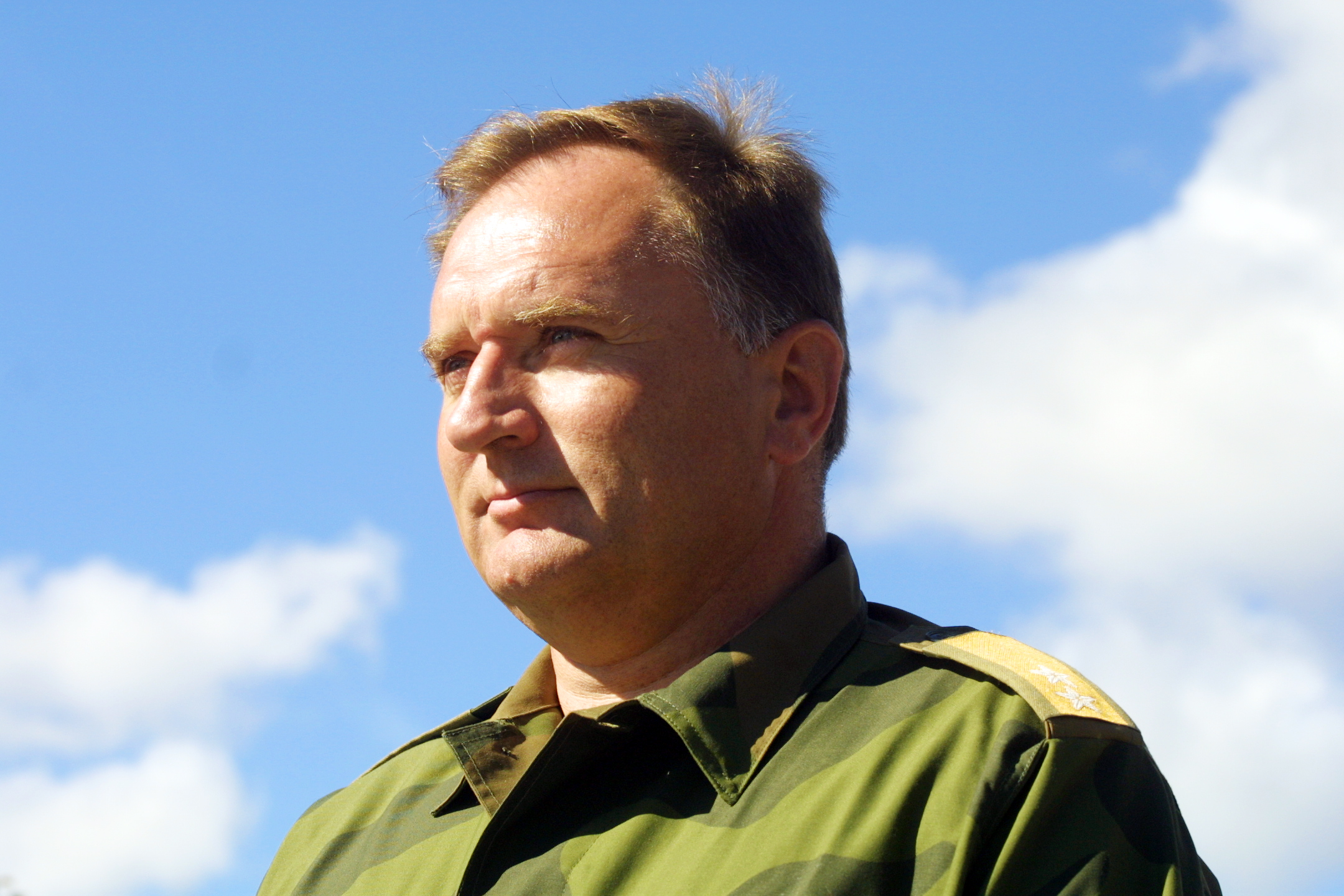
- Born: 18 November 1949 (age 76); Oslo, Norway
- Military career
- Allegiance: Norway
- Branch: Norwegian Army
- Service years: 1969–2009
- Rank: General
- Commands: Chief of Staff; Chief of Defence of Norway

General Sverre Diesen (born 18 November 1949 in Oslo) is a Norwegian military officer and former Chief of Defence of Norway. Diesen was succeeded as Chief of Defence by Lieutenant General Harald Sunde on 1 October 2009.

Military offices
Preceded by Sigurd Frisvold	Chief of Defence of Norway; 2005–2009	Succeeded by Harald Sunde
