= Erland Frisvold =

Norwegian colonel, civil engineer, and mayor

Erlanc Frisvold
- Born: May 13, 1877; Lom Municipality, Norway
- Died: August 22, 1971 (aged 94)
- Occupation: Military officer
- Children: Paal Frisvold
- Relatives: Rikard Kaarbø (father-in-law); Ragnhild Kaarbø (sister-in-law)

Erland Frisvold (May 13, 1877 – August 22, 1971) was a Norwegian colonel, civil engineer, and mayor of Harstad Municipality.

Frisvold was born at the Kjæstad farm in Lom Municipality in Norway. He was the eldest child of Pål Erlandsson Frisvold (1846–1912) and Anne Rolvsdotter Blakar Frisvold (1850–1937). He graduated from the Military Academy in 1899, and from the Norwegian Military College in 1902, and then served as the civil engineer for Harstad from 1908 to 1911. He served as the mayor of Harstad from 1911 to 1912 and again from 1926 to 1929. During the Second World War, he commanded Infantry Regiment No. 12, taking part in the Battles of Narvik. He died on August 22, 1971, and is buried in Oslo's Western Cemetery (Vestre gravlund).

Frisvold was married to Valdis Kaarbø (1882–1961), the daughter of Rikard Kaarbø (1850–1901), a leading businessman in Harstad. He was the father of Lieutenant General Paal Frisvold.
