= Sigurd Frisvold =

Norwegian general (1947–2022)

Sigurd Frisvold (5 July 1947 – 29 November 2022) was a Norwegian general who served as Chief of Defence of Norway from 30 April 1999 until 1 April 2005.

Frisvold was born in Kristiansund. He was educated in the Norwegian army, in addition to cand.mag.-degrees in history, political science and social studies.

Having served as head of Forsvarskommando Sør-Norge (the Southern Norway Defence Command) Frisvold succeeded Arne Solli as Chief of Defence of Norway on 30 April 1999. During his leadership period the armed forces underwent major reorganization and closure of units and camps, as well as introduction of some new administrative measures, including the introduction of Regional Support Function (Norwegian: Regional støttefunksjon, RSF) and Horizontal Trade (Norwegian: Horisontal samhandel).

On 10 December 2004, Frisvold announced that he would be resigning of his own volition as Chief of Defence after he had been on sick leave several times the last year. On the same day Sverre Diesen was appointed his successor, and Diesen took over on 1 April 2005.

Frisvold died on 29 November 2022, at the age of 75.

== Awards ==
Frisvold was the holder of a number of Norwegian and foreign orders and decorations:

- Multinational Force and Observer Medal 1984
- Norwegian Defense Medal 1992
- Norwegian Defense Medal with Laurel Branch 1996
- Commander with Star of the Royal Norwegian Order of St. Olav 2000
- Commander Grand Cross of the Order of the Lion of Finland 2000
- Commanders of the Order of Merit of the Republic of Poland 2001
- Grand Officer of the French Ordre national du Mérite 2002
- Commander Grand Cross of the Swedish Order of the Polar Star 2003
- Estonian 1st Class Military Order of the Cross of the Eagle 2004

Frisvold was also a fellow of the Norwegian Academy of Technological Sciences.

Military offices
Preceded by Arne Solli	Chief of Defence of Norway; 1999–2005	Succeeded by Sverre Diesen
