= Paal Frisvold (born 1908) =

Norwegian general (1908–1997)

- Born: 22 January 1908; Harstad, Norway
- Died: 16 March 1997 (aged 89)
- Occupation: Military officer
- Parent: Erland Frisvold
- Relatives: Rikard Kaarbø (grandfather); Ragnhild Kaarbø (aunt)
- Awards: Order of St. Olav; Order of the Sword; Order of the Dannebrog; Order of the Lion of Finland; Belgian Order of the Crown; Haakon VII 70th Anniversary Medal; Defence Medal 1940–1945; Legion of Merit

Paal Frisvold (22 January 1908 – 16 March 1997) was a Norwegian general, who was head of the Norwegian Army from 1961 to 1966.

== Personal life ==
Frisvold was born in Harstad, the son of Erland Frisvold (1877–1971) and Valdis Kaarbø Frisvold (1882–1961). In 1936 he married Kirsten Semb.

== Career ==
Frisvold finished his examen artium in 1928, graduated as a military officer in 1932, and from the Norwegian Military College in 1934. He was made a lieutenant in the infantry from 1932, and served as a trainee with the General Staff from 1935 to 1938. From 1938 to 1940 he was secretary at the Ministry of Defence. Frisvold was among the group of central persons who developed military resistance in Norway in 1940 and 1941, eventually leading to the formation of Milorg. In March 1941 he had to flee to Sweden. He was staff leader at the Norwegian police troops in Sweden in 1945, and head of the Norwegian Military Academy from 1946 to 1949. From 1961 to 1966 he was assigned chief of the Norwegian Army, with the rank of lieutenant general. In 1966 he served as military attaché in Washington. From 1968 to 1977 he was assigned director of Industrivernet.

== Awards ==
Frisvold was awarded the Haakon VII 70th Anniversary Medal, the Defence Medal 1940–1945, and the Grand Cross of the American Legion of Merit. He was decorated Commander of the Order of St. Olav in 1961, Commander of the Order of the Lion of Finland, and Knight of the Danish Order of the Dannebrog. He received the Grand Cross of the Belgian Order of the Crown and the Grand Cross of the Swedish Order of the Sword.
