= Ragnhild Kaarbø =

Norwegian painter

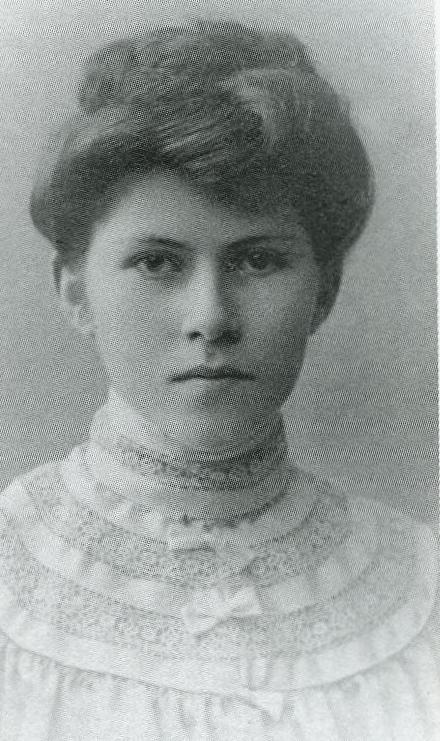
- Ragnhild Kaarbø c.1910
- Born: 26 December 1889; Harstad, Norway
- Died: 20 August 1949 (aged 59); Oslo
- Occupation: Painter
- Parent: Rikard Kaarbø
- Relatives: Erland Frisvold (brother-in-law); Paal Frisvold (nephew)

Ragnhild Kaarbø (26 December 1889 – 20 August 1949) was a Norwegian painter. Influenced by Fauvism, she painted expressionistic portraits. She was also influenced by Cubism, but as her cubistic paintings were criticized by the press, she eventually focused on impressionistic landscape paintings.

== Personal life ==
Born on 26 December 1889 in Harstad in Troms, Kaarbø was one of thirteen children born to Rikard Kaarbø and Anna Elisabeth Lund. Her father was a successful businessman who was associated with the establishment of the town of Harstad. He founded several businesses and fostered development of the local shipping industry.

== Career ==
Kaarbø attended a boarding school in Celle, Germany, and decided to pursue a career in art. She studied at the Norwegian National Academy of Craft and Art Industry in Kristiania (now Oslo), and further with Henrik Sørensen and Harriet Backer, and with expressionist Kees van Dongen in Paris. In 1918, she held her first solo exhibition in the Artists' Association in Kristiania (now Oslo).

Between 1920 and 1930 she stayed mainly in Paris where she followed the teaching of several noted artists, including Andre Lhote and Pedro Luiz Correia de Araújo (Brazilian, Paris- and Rio-based, 1874–1955). Between 1925 and 1927 she was a student of Fernand Léger and Amédée Ozenfant at the Académie Moderne.

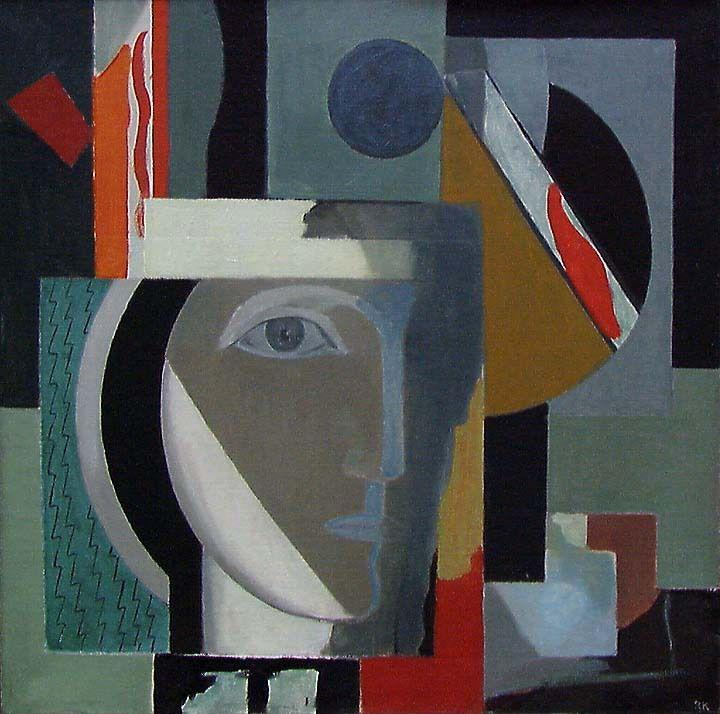
Komposisjon med hode, 1925

During her early years, Kaarbø was influenced by Fauvism, and painted many expressionistic portraits of women. She then had a period when she mainly painted landscapes, both coastal subjects and town motifs. In Paris in the 1920s she was influenced by Cubism and other avant-garde styles. She participated at the exhibition Otte skandinaviske kubister ("Eight Scandinavian cubists") at Kunstnerforbundet in Oslo in 1926. The exhibition was met with great interest but mostly negative criticism, and Kunstnerforbundet was even boycotted by the press. Disappointed by the negative response, Kaarbø switched to painting landscapes in an Impressionist style.

She participated in several exhibitions, including two works at the Salon d'automne in 1922, and she participated in the Exposition Académie Moderne Exhibition at the Gallery of Art Contemporain in 1926 and the Exposition de l'Académie Moderne Léger Ozenfant in the Gallery Aubier in 1927. Among her works at the National Gallery of Norway are Komposisjon med hode from 1925 and Fra Siena from 1937.

Kaarbø was included in the 2013 exhibition Electromagnetic: Modern Art in Northern Europe 1918-31 at the Henie Onstad Art Center.

== Death ==
Kaarbø died in Oslo on 26 December 1949.
