= Chief of Defence (Norway) =

Highest-ranking professional military officer in the Norwegian Armed Forces

- Forsvarssjefen
- Coat of arms for the Chief of Defence

- Standard for the Chief of Defence

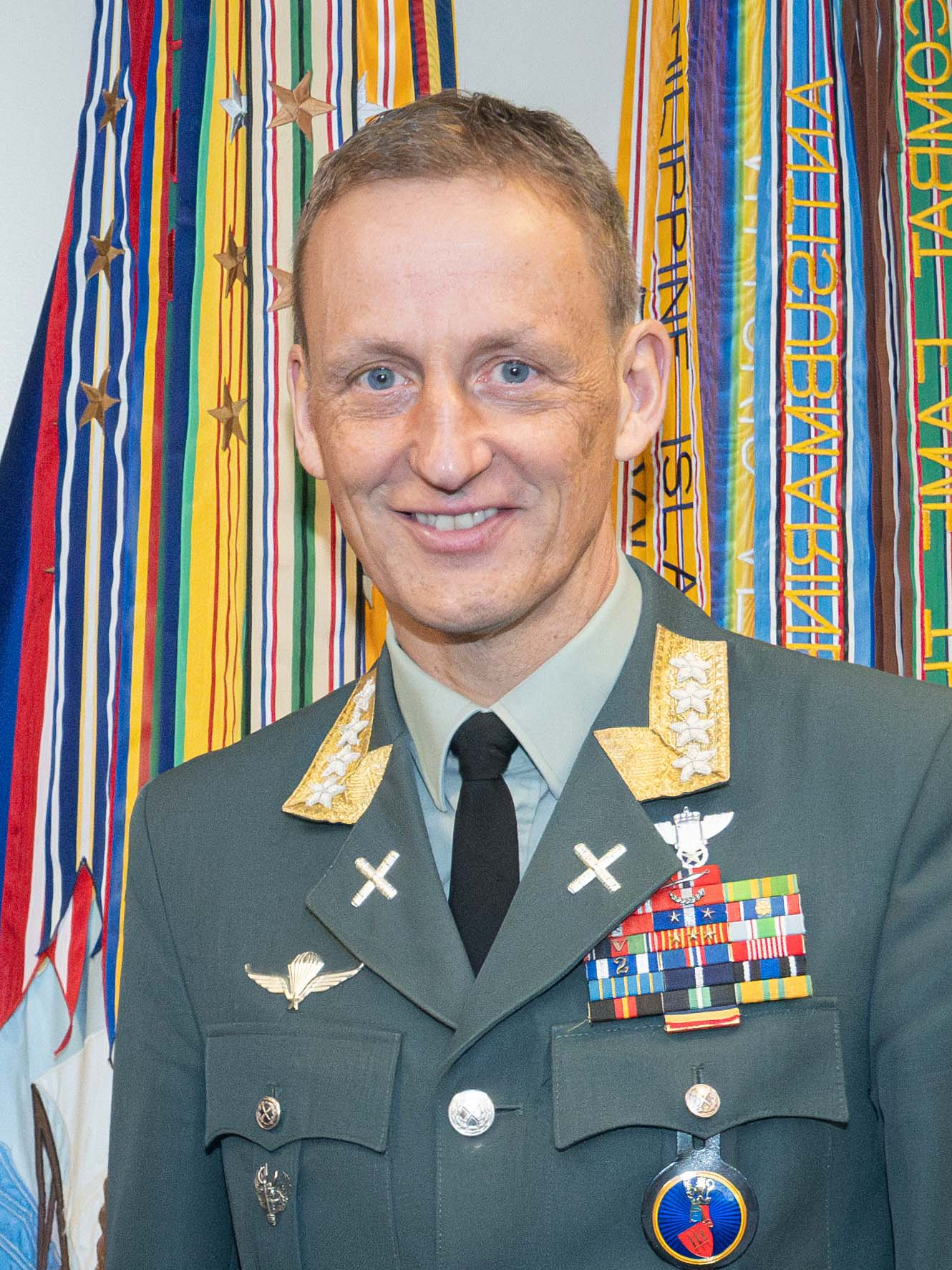
- Incumbent; Eirik Kristoffersen since 17 August 2020
- Ministry of Defence
- Reports to: Minister of Defence
- Appointer: The Prime Minister with approval from The Council of State
- Formation: 18 May 1940
- First holder: Otto Ruge

The Chief of Defence (Forsvarssjefen) is the highest-ranking officer of the Norwegian Armed Forces, second only to the King of Norway. Even though he holds the same rank as the King of Norway, according to the Norwegian Constitution the King holds the highest command of the Army, Air Force, Navy and Home Guard.

The Chief of Defence is the top advisor to the Government regarding military issues. He is responsible for carrying out the mission the King or Minister of Defence gives to the Military. He is also Norway's representative to NATO's military committee.

The post was first established in 1940, and is currently held by General Eirik Kristoffersen.

== List of Chiefs of Defence ==
| No. | Portrait | Chief of Defence | Took office | Left office | Time in office | Defence branch |
|---|---|---|---|---|---|---|
| 1 | Otto Ruge | Major General; Otto Ruge (1882–1961) | 18 May 1940 | 9 June 1940 | 22 days | Norwegian Army |
| – | Carl Gustav Fleischer | Major General; Carl Gustav Fleischer (1883–1942); Acting | 10 June 1940 | 22 February 1942 | 1 year, 257 days | Norwegian Army |
| 2 | Wilhelm von Tangen Hansteen | Major General; Wilhelm von Tangen Hansteen (1896–1980) | 23 February 1942 | 30 June 1944 | 2 years, 128 days | Norwegian Army |
| 3 | Olav | HRH Crown Prince; Olav (1903–1991) | 1 July 1944 | 15 July 1945 | 1 year, 14 days | Norwegian Army |
| (1) | Otto Ruge | Lieutenant General; Otto Ruge (1882–1961) | 16 July 1945 | 31 December 1945 | 168 days | Norwegian Army |
| – | Elias Corneliussen | Rear Admiral; Elias Corneliussen (1881–1951); Acting | 1 January 1946 | 31 May 1946 | 150 days | Royal Norwegian Navy |
| – | Halvor Hansson | Major General; Halvor Hansson (1886–1956); Acting | 1 June 1946 | 31 July 1946 | 60 days | Norwegian Army |
| 4 | Ole Berg | Lieutenant General; Ole Berg (1890–1968) (as Chief of the Defence Staff) | 1 August 1946 | 31 October 1955 | 9 years, 91 days | Norwegian Army |
| 5 | Finn Lambrechts | Lieutenant General; Finn Lambrechts (1900–1956) (as Chief of the Defence Staff) | 1 November 1955 | 8 December 1956 † | 1 year, 37 days | Royal Norwegian Air Force |
| 6 | Bjarne Øen | Lieutenant General; Bjarne Øen (1898–1994) (as Chief of the Defence Staff) | 10 January 1957 | 31 December 1962 | 5 years, 355 days | Royal Norwegian Air Force |
| (6) | Bjarne Øen | Lieutenant General; Bjarne Øen (1898–1994) | 1 January 1963 | 31 December 1963 | 364 days | Royal Norwegian Air Force |
| 7 | Folke Hauger Johannessen | Vice Admiral; Folke Hauger Johannessen (1913–1997) | 1 January 1964 | 31 December 1972 | 8 years, 365 days | Royal Norwegian Navy |
| 8 | Herman Fredrik Zeiner-Gundersen | General; Herman Fredrik Zeiner-Gundersen (1915–2002) | 1 February 1972 | 20 March 1977 | 5 years, 47 days | Norwegian Army |
| 9 | Sverre B. Hamre | General; Sverre B. Hamre (1918–1990) | 21 March 1977 | 30 June 1982 | 5 years, 70 days | Norwegian Army |
| 10 | Sven Hauge | General; Sven Hauge (1923–1997) | 1 July 1982 | 30 June 1984 | 1 year, 365 days | Royal Norwegian Air Force |
| 11 | Fredrik Bull-Hansen | General; Fredrik Bull-Hansen (1927–2018) | 1 July 1984 | 31 August 1987 | 3 years, 61 days | Norwegian Army |
| 12 | Vigleik Eide | General; Vigleik Eide (1933–2011) | 31 August 1987 | 5 September 1989 | 2 years, 5 days | Norwegian Army |
| 13 | Torolf Rein | Admiral; Torolf Rein (born 1934) | 5 September 1989 | 31 October 1994 | 5 years, 56 days | Royal Norwegian Navy |
| 14 | Arne Solli | General; Arne Solli (1938–2017) | 31 October 1994 | 30 April 1999 | 4 years, 181 days | Norwegian Army |
| 15 | Sigurd Frisvold | General; Sigurd Frisvold (1947–2022) | 1 May 1999 | 31 March 2005 | 5 years, 334 days | Norwegian Army |
| 16 | Sverre Diesen | General; Sverre Diesen (born 1949) | 1 April 2005 | 30 September 2009 | 4 years, 182 days | Norwegian Army |
| 17 | Harald Sunde | General; Harald Sunde (born 1954) | 1 October 2009 | 19 November 2013 | 4 years, 49 days | Norwegian Army |
| 18 | Haakon Bruun-Hanssen | Admiral; Haakon Bruun-Hanssen (born 1960) | 19 November 2013 | 17 August 2020 | 6 years, 272 days | Royal Norwegian Navy |
| 19 | Eirik Kristoffersen | General; Eirik Kristoffersen (born 1969) | 17 August 2020 | Incumbent | 6 years, 21 days | Norwegian Army |
