= 1948 in Norway =

- Centuries: 18th; 19th; 20th; 21st
- Decades: 1920s; 1930s; 1940s; 1950s; 1960s
- See also: List of years in Norway

Events in the year 1948 in Norway.

== Incumbents ==
- Monarch – Haakon VII.
- Prime Minister – Einar Gerhardsen (Labour Party)

== Events ==
- 30 August – The opening of the University of Bergen.
- 2 October – Bukken Bruse disaster: a flying boat crashes upon landing in Trondheim, Norway; 19 are killed; Bertrand Russell is among the 24 survivors.
- 12 June - Norway beat Denmark 1-2 in a football friendly match.
- 29 February – The Kråkerøy speech: Prime minister Einar Gerhardsen attacks the Communist Party of Norway in a dramatic speech.
- December - The first Donald Duck & Co cartoon magazine is released in Norway.
- 9 December – Riksteatret (The National Travelling Theatre) is established.

== Notable births ==
=== January to June ===
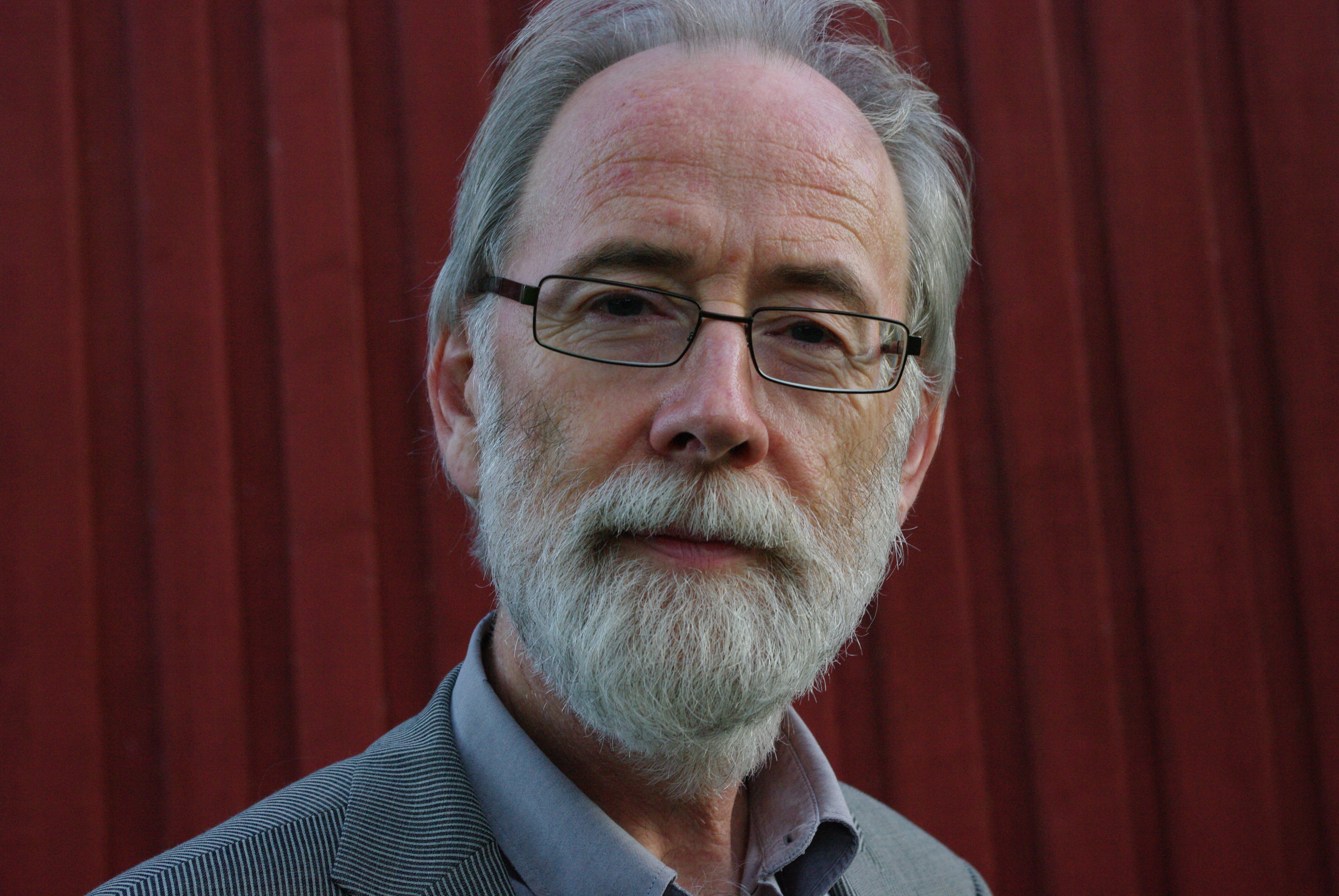
Arild Stubhaug

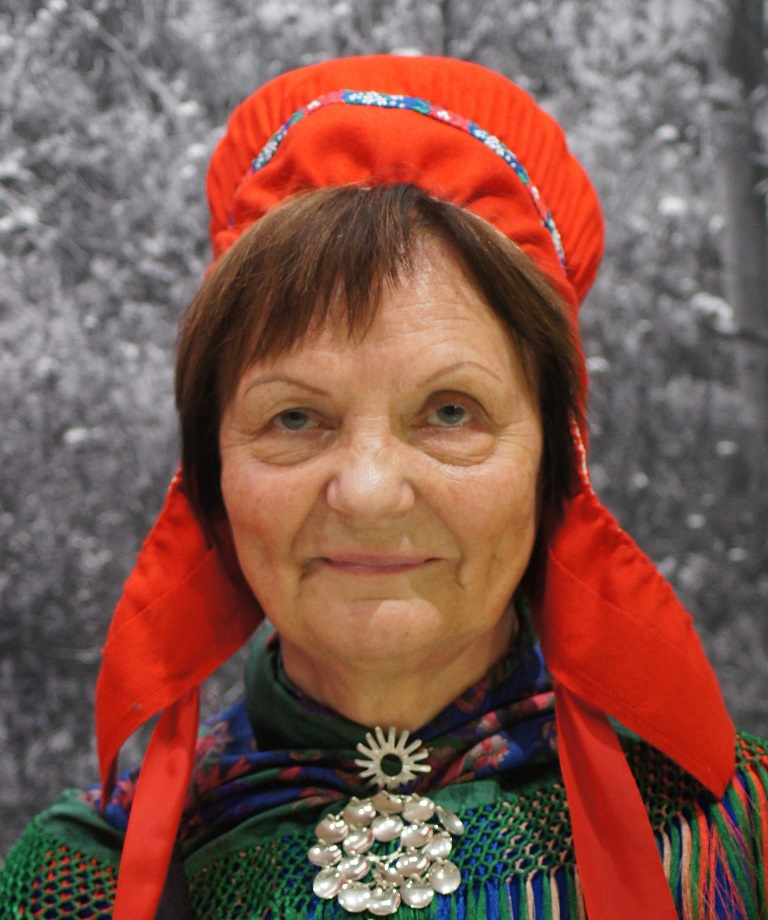
Inga Ravna Eira

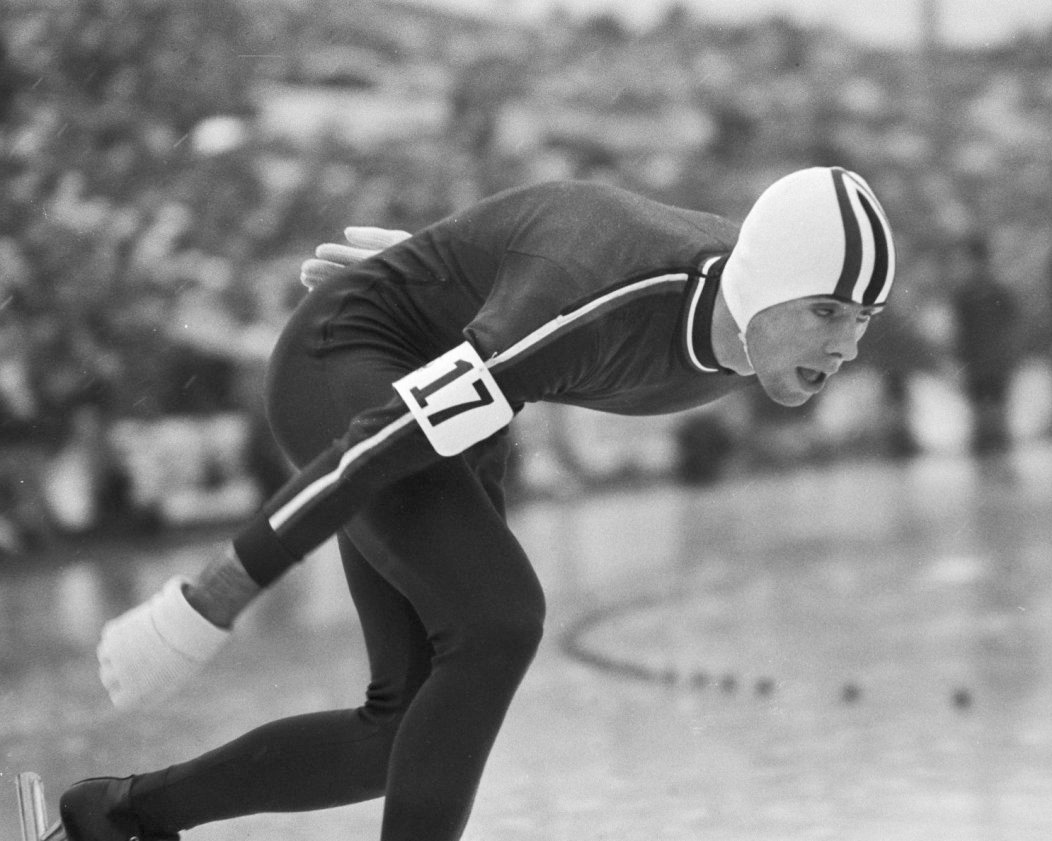
Dag Fornæss

- 10 January – Ellen Kjellberg, dancer
- 14 January – Lisbeth Korsmo, speed skater and cyclist (died 2017)
- 15 January – Kenneth Hugdahl, psychologist and author
- 23 January – Gunnar Stubseid, folk musician and educator (died 2024)
- 27 January – Arne Skauge, politician
- 31 January – Per Bjørang, speed skater and Sprint World Champion.
- 2 February – John Thune, politician
- 24 February – Modulf Aukan, politician
- 4 March – Ernst Håkon Jahr, linguist
- 5 March – Tore Tønne, politician (died 2002)
- 10 March – Hans Rotmo, singer and songwriter (died 2024)
- 12 March – Rolf Reikvam, politician
- 14 March – Sten Osther, handball player
- 18 March – Ola T. Lånke, politician
- 19 March – Leif Jenssen, weightlifter and Olympic gold medallist
- 23 March – Knut Magne Myrland, singer, guitarist and songwriter (died 2021)
- 23 March – Knut Tarald Taraldsen, linguist
- 3 April – Thor Lillehovde, politician
- 6 April – Philip Øgaard, cinematographer
- 19 April – Geir Røse, handball player
- 1 May – Bård Tønder, judge
- 4 May – Aud Kvalbein, politician
- 25 May
  - Per Oskar Kjølaas, bishop
  - Arild Stubhaug, poet and biographer.
- 30 May –
  - Inga Ravna Eira, Northern Sami language poet, children's writer and translator
  - Morten M. Kristiansen, illustrator
- 31 May – Bård Mikkelsen, businessperson
- 2 June – Jørgen Gunnerud, crime fiction writer (died 2025)
- 6 June – Knut Kjeldstadli, historian
- 15 June – Asgeir Almås, politician
- 16 June – Gunnar Steintveit, lawyer and judge
- 23 June – Kari Nordheim-Larsen, politician
- 29 June – Helge Karlsen, footballer
- 30 June – Dag Fornæss, speed skater

=== July to December ===
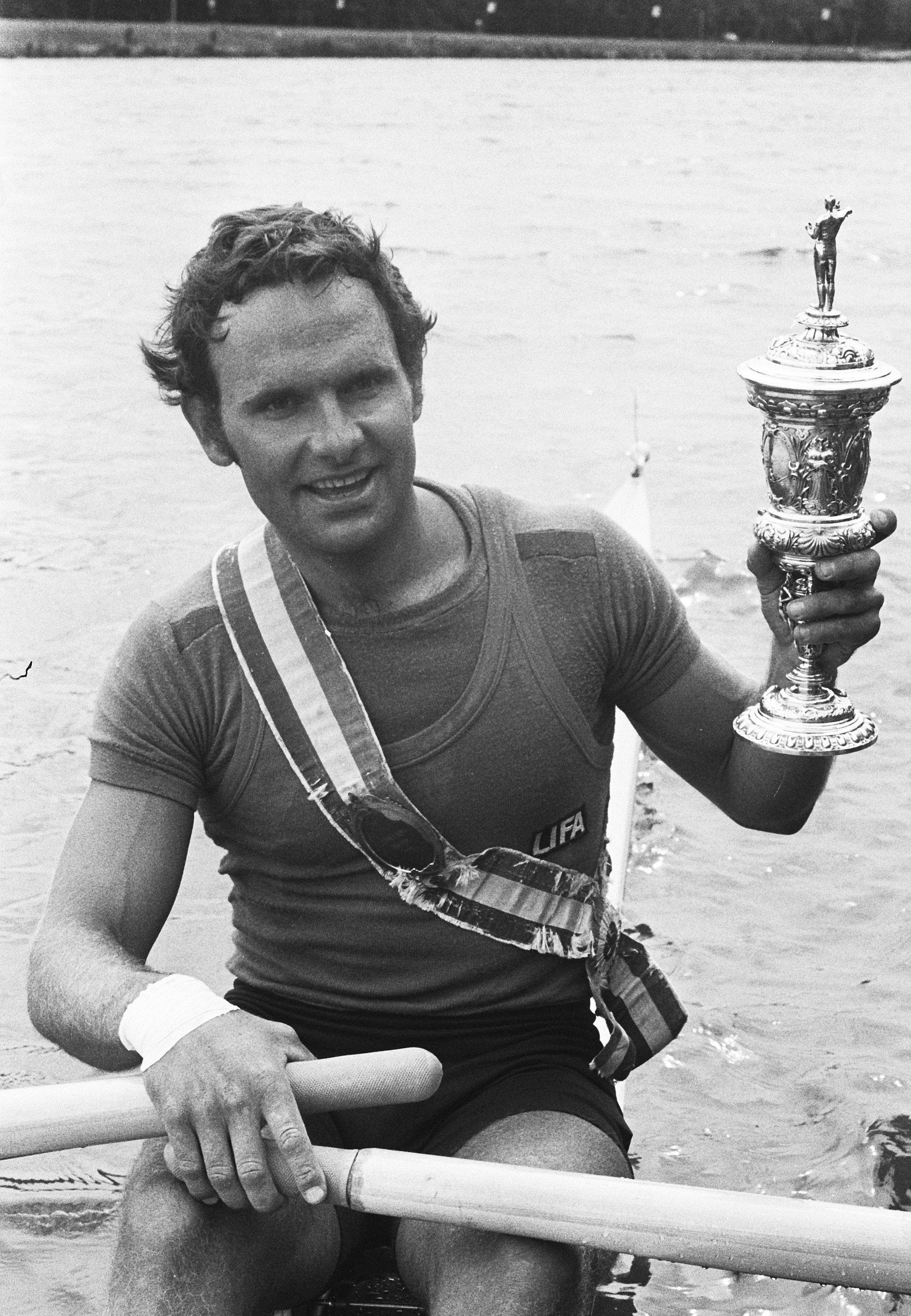
Alf Hansen

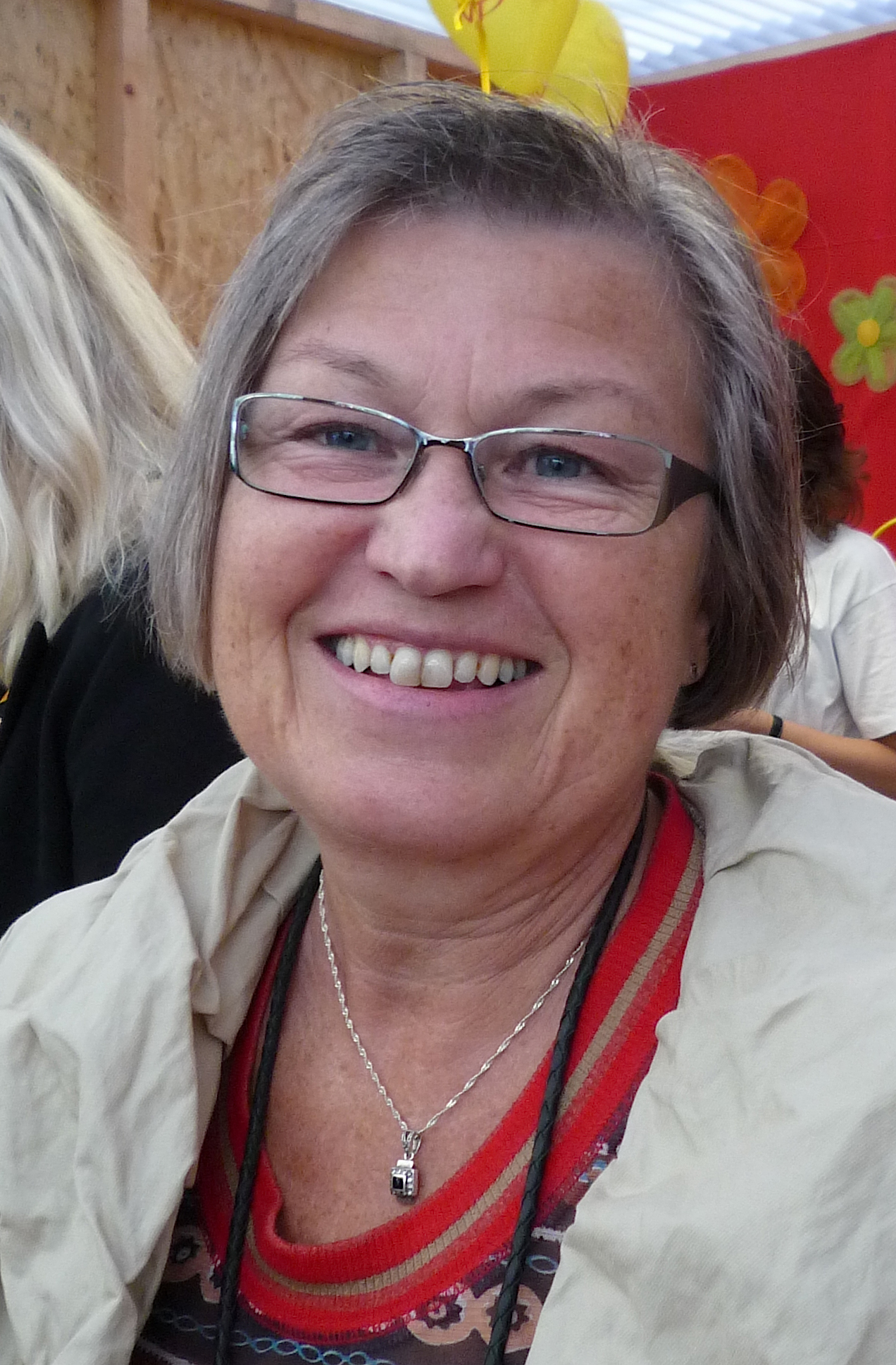
Laila Dåvøy

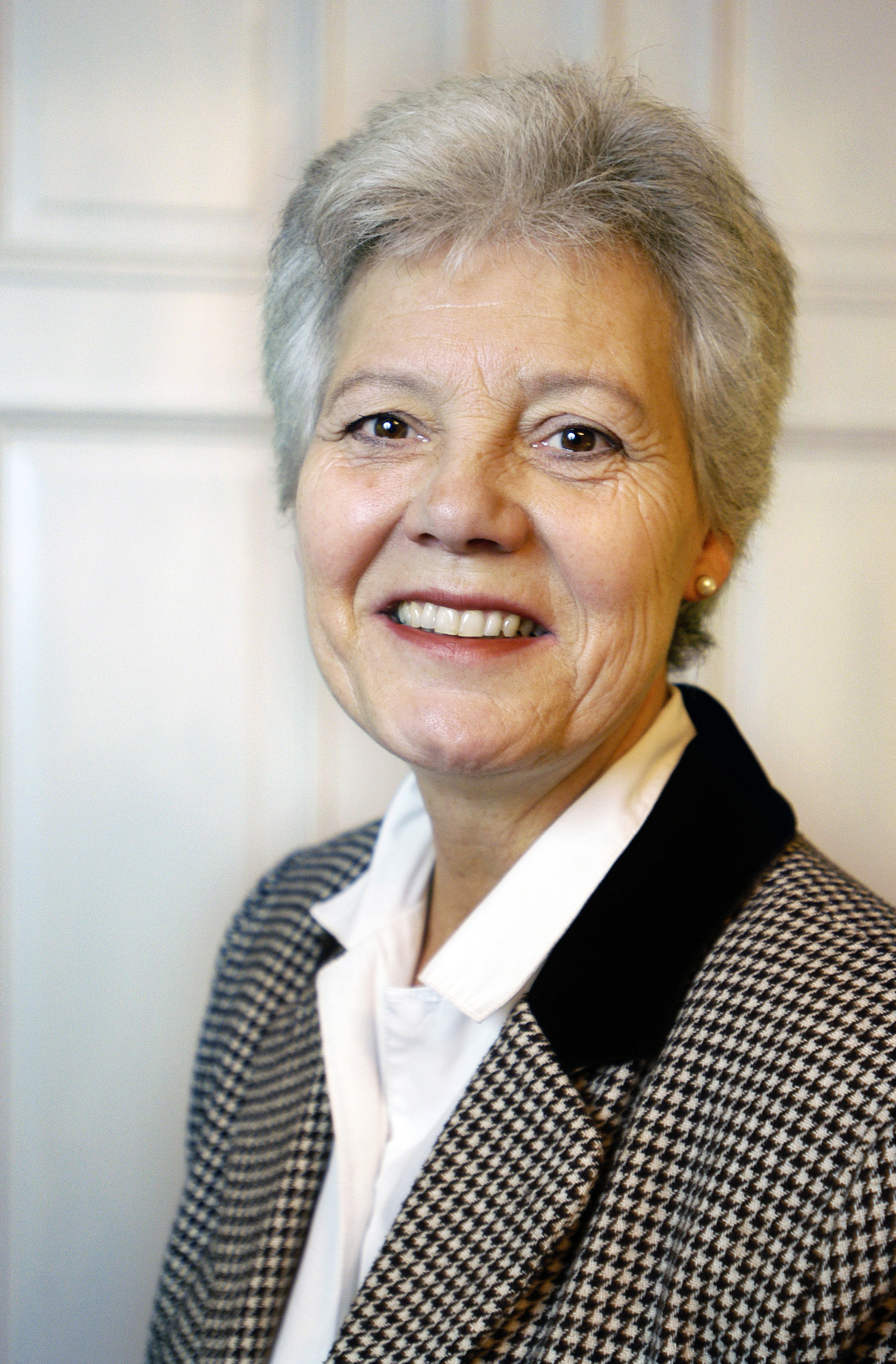
Frida Nokken

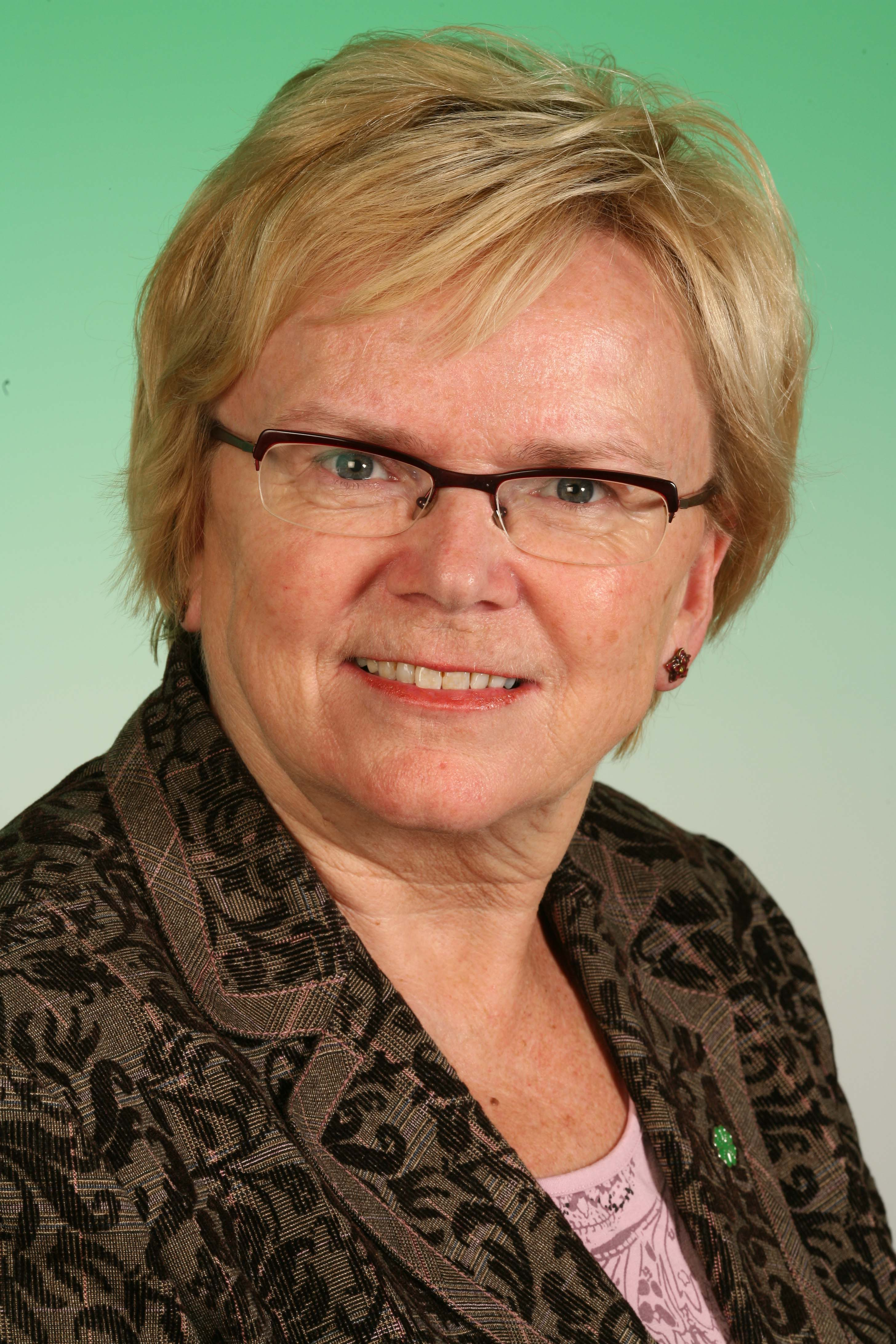
Magnhild Meltveit Kleppa

- 6 July – Inger S. Enger, politician
- 9 July
  - Leiv Kristen Sydnes, chemist
  - Gunnar Torvund, sculptor
  - Gunnar Viken, politician
- 13 July – Alf Hansen, rower
- 22 July – Oddbjørg Ausdal Starrfelt, politician
- 23 July – Steinar Tjomsland, judge
- 26 July – Svein Ole Sæther, diplomat
- 4 August – Per Ankre, handball player
- 10 August – Per Ivar Gjærum, economist
- 11 August – Laila Dåvøy, politician
- 16 August – Arne Bergodd, rower
- 25 August – Kjell Arne Bratli, writer and Norwegian Parliamentary Ombudsman for the Armed Forces
- 29 August – Jens Revold, politician
- 3 September – Oddbjørn Vatne, politician
- 18 September – Geir Karlsen, footballer
- 20 September
  - Terje Hanssen, biathlete
  - Frida Nokken, civil servant
- 25 September
  - Peter Gullestad, civil servant
  - Petter Vennerød, film director
- 26 September – Svein Munkejord, politician
- 28 September – Knut Børø, long-distance runner
- 11 October – Sharon Johansen, model and actress
- 12 October – Kari Sørheim, politician
- 21 October –
  - I. H. Monrad Aas, researcher
  - Kurt Narvesen, poet and translator (died 2024)
- 25 October – Sigleif Johansen, biathlete
- 3 November – Elsa Skarbøvik, politician
- 11 November
  - Marit Christensen, journalist
  - Ole Christian Kvarme, bishop
- 12 November – Magnhild Meltveit Kleppa, politician
- 22 November – Jens Harald Bratlie, pianist and professor
- 24 November – Sture Arntzen, trade unionist
- 29 November – Geir Ellingsrud, professor of mathematics
- 2 December – Eyvind Hellstrøm, chef and television presenter
- 10 December – Harald Espelund, politician
- 15 December – Olaf Gjedrem, politician
- 22 December – Stein Ove Berg, singer and songwriter (died 2002).

=== Full date unknown ===
- Dag Album, sociologist
- Gunnar Sørbø, anthropologist
- Knut Sprauten, historian

== Notable deaths ==
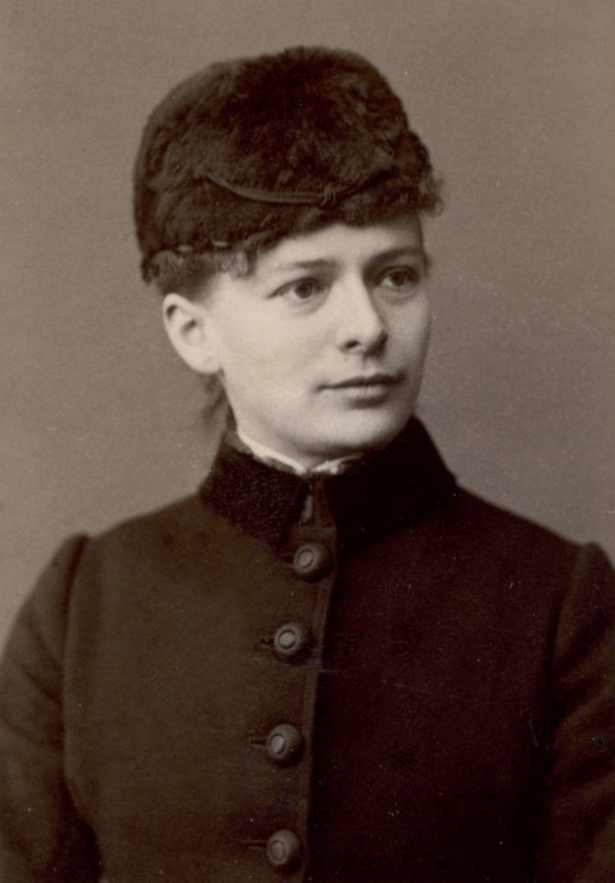
Ambrosia Tønnesen

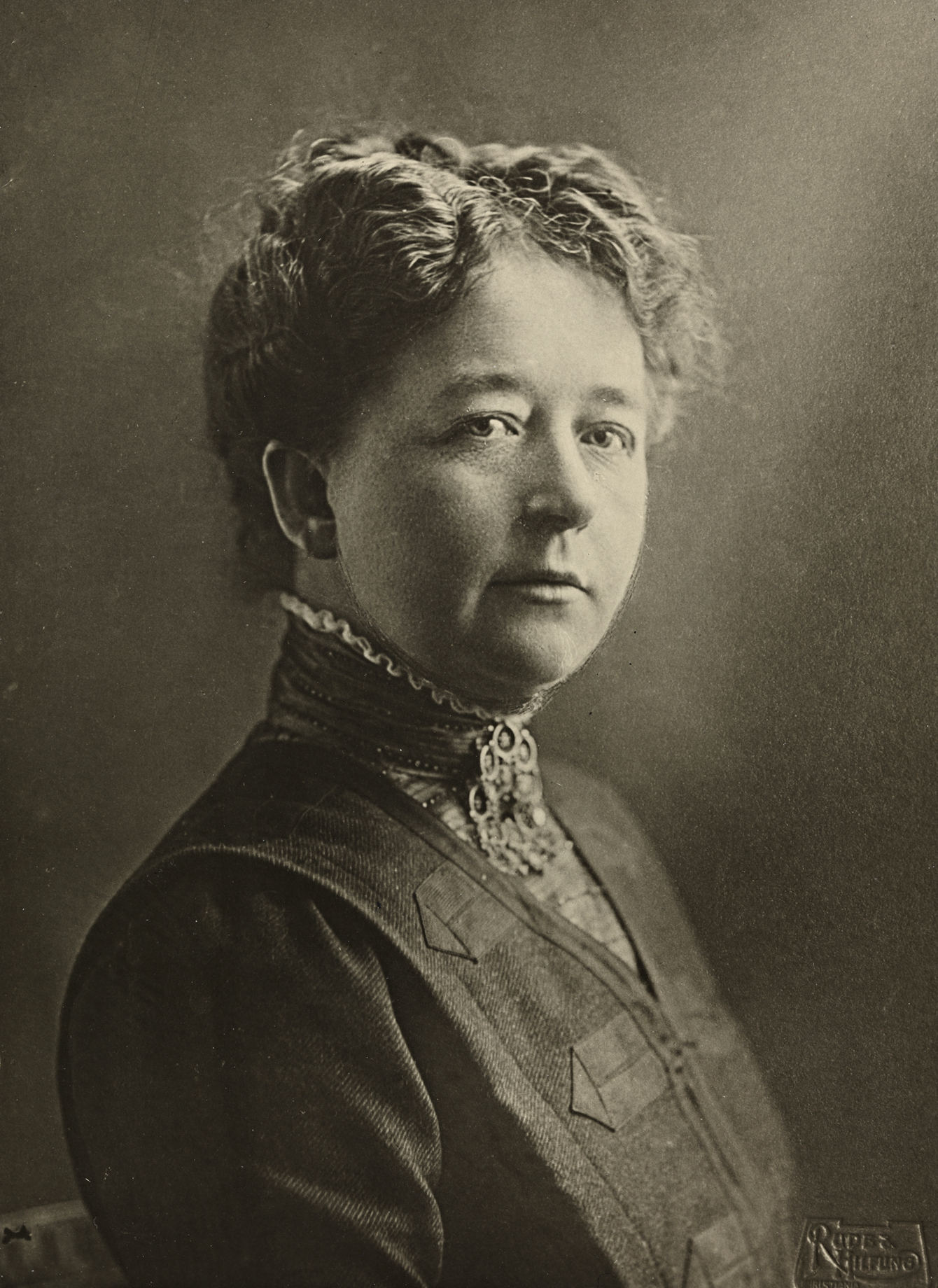
Kristine Bonnevie

- 1 January – Hans Clarin Hovind Mustad, businessperson (b. 1871)
- 21 January – Ambrosia Tønnesen, sculptor (b. 1859)
- 30 January – Peter Andreas Morell, politician (b. 1868)
- 7 February
  - Alf Aanning, gymnast (b. 1896)
  - Poul Heegaard, Danish mathematician active in the field of topology, professor in mathematics at the University of Copenhagen 1910–1917, professor in mathematics at the University of Kristiania 1917–1941 (b. 1871)
- 9 April – Cato Andreas Sverdrup, politician (b. 1896)
- 26 April – Johan Olaf Bredal, politician (b. 1862)
- 23 June – Sven Oftedal, politician (b. 1905)
- 4 August – Kristoffer Olsen, sailor (b. 1883).
- 16 August – Paul Pedersen, gymnast (b. 1886)
- 28 August – Ragnar Skancke, politician (b. 1890)
- 30 August – Kristine Bonnevie, biologist and Norway's first female professor (b. 1872)
- 7 October – Johan Hjort, fisheries scientist, marine zoologist and oceanographer (b. 1869)
- 8 October – Olaf Bryn, politician (b. 1872)
- 12 October – Nils Trædal, cleric, politician (b. 1879)
- 22 December – Emanuel Vigeland, artist (b. 1875)

=== Full date unknown ===
- Agnar Johannes Barth, forester (b. 1871)
- Ivar Flem, newspaper editor (b. 1865).
- Gustav Adolf Lammers Heiberg, barrister and politician (b. 1875)
