= Sivert Langholm =

Norwegian historian (1927–2022)

Sivert Langholm (19 May 1927 – 16 April 2022) was a Norwegian historian.

== Life and career ==
Sivert Langholm was born in Haugesund, and was the brother of Odd Langholm. He was a cand.philol. by education, and was appointed professor at the University of Oslo in 1976. His main areas of research were 19th-century social history and the history of the university. Langholm also headed the editorial committee of the five-volume work Oslo bys historie, covering the history of Oslo. The five volumes were penned by Arnved Nedkvitne and Per G. Norseng (the period 1000 to 1536), Knut Sprauten (the period 1536 to 1814), Jan Eivind Myhre (the period 1814 to 1900), Knut Kjeldstadli (the period 1900 to 1948) and Edgeir Benum (the period 1948 to the 1990s) respectively.

Langholm was a member of the Norwegian Academy of Science and Letters. From 1984 to 1988 he chaired the Norwegian Historical Association. For his seventieth birthday, a Festschrift was issued. It was edited by Knut Kjeldstadli, Jan Eivind Myhre and Tore Pryser.

Sivert Langholm died on 16 April 2022, at the age of 94.
