= Kjeldstadli =

Kjeldstadli is a Norwegian surname. Notable people with the surname include:

- Knut Kjeldstadli (1948–2025), Norwegian historian, son of Sverre
- Sverre Kjeldstadli (1916–1961), Norwegian historian, father of Knut
