= Knut Sprauten =

Norwegian historian (born 1948)

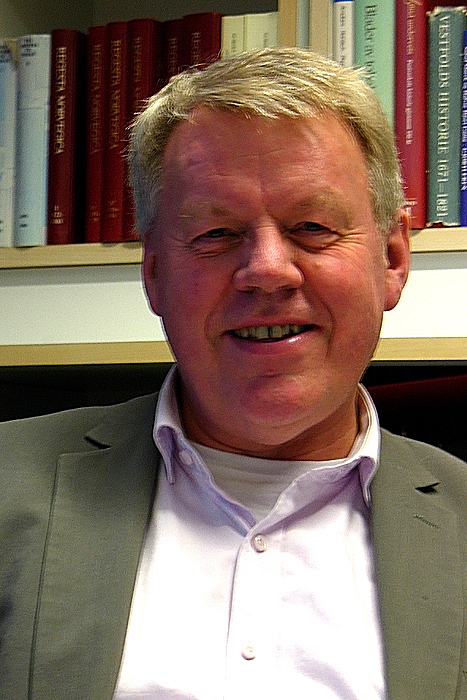
Knut Sprauten (2013)

Knut Sprauten (born 22 June 1948) is a Norwegian historian.

He hails from Namdal, and took the cand.philol. degree in 1974. He was hired as the head of a department in the National Archival Services of Norway in 1991. In 1992 he released Byen ved festningen: fra 1536 til 1814, volume two of the work Oslo bys historie, covering the history of Oslo. The other volumes were penned by Arnved Nedkvitne and Per G. Norseng (the period 1000 to 1536), Jan Eivind Myhre (the period 1814 to 1900), Knut Kjeldstadli (the period 1900 to 1948) and Edgeir Benum (the period 1948 to the 1990s). Sprauten also contributed to the encyclopedia Norsk biografisk leksikon. In late 2000 Sprauten was hired as the director of the Norwegian Institute of Local History.

He resides at Jar.
