= Gjerpen =

Gjerpen may refer to:

== Places ==
- Gjerpen Municipality, a former municipality in Telemark county, Norway
- Gjerpen prestegjeld, a former geographic subdivision of the Church of Norway in Telemark county, Norway
- Gjerpen Church, a church in Skien Municipality in Telemark county, Norway

== People ==
- Cathrine Gjerpen (born 1987), a Norwegian sailor

== Other ==
- Gjerpen IF, a sports club based in Skien Municipality in Telemark county, Norway
