= Sorbo =

Sorbo may refer to:

== People ==
- Gunnar Sørbø (born 1948), social anthropologist and a former director of the Chr. Michelsen Institute (CMI)
- Jan Inge Sørbø (born 1954), Norwegian philologist, author, and poet
- Kari Sørbø (born 1955), Norwegian radio personality
- Braeden Sorbo (born 2001), American actor
- Kevin Sorbo (born 1958), American actor
- Sam Sorbo (born 1966), American actress

== Places ==
- Sorbo-Ocagnano, a commune in Haute-Corse department on the island of Corsica, France
- Sorbo San Basile, a village in Catanzaro, Calabria, Italy
- Sorbo Serpico, a town in Avellino, Campania, Italy
- Sorbo (Tagliacozzo), a frazione in L'Aquila, Abruzzo, Italy
- Sørbø, a village in Rennesøy municipality, Rogaland county, Norway

== Other ==
- Sorbo, a type of rubber used in various products, like the Mk 2 mine
- Sorbo, Italian for the sorb apple family of trees
