= Benum =

Benum is a Norwegian surname. People with the surname include:

- Edgeir Benum (born 1939), Norwegian historian
- Jarle Benum (1928–2021), Norwegian politician
- Olav Benum (1897–1990), Norwegian politician
- Pål Benum (1935–2021), Norwegian long-distance runner
