= Luksefjell Church =

Church in Telemark, Norway

- Luksefjell kirke
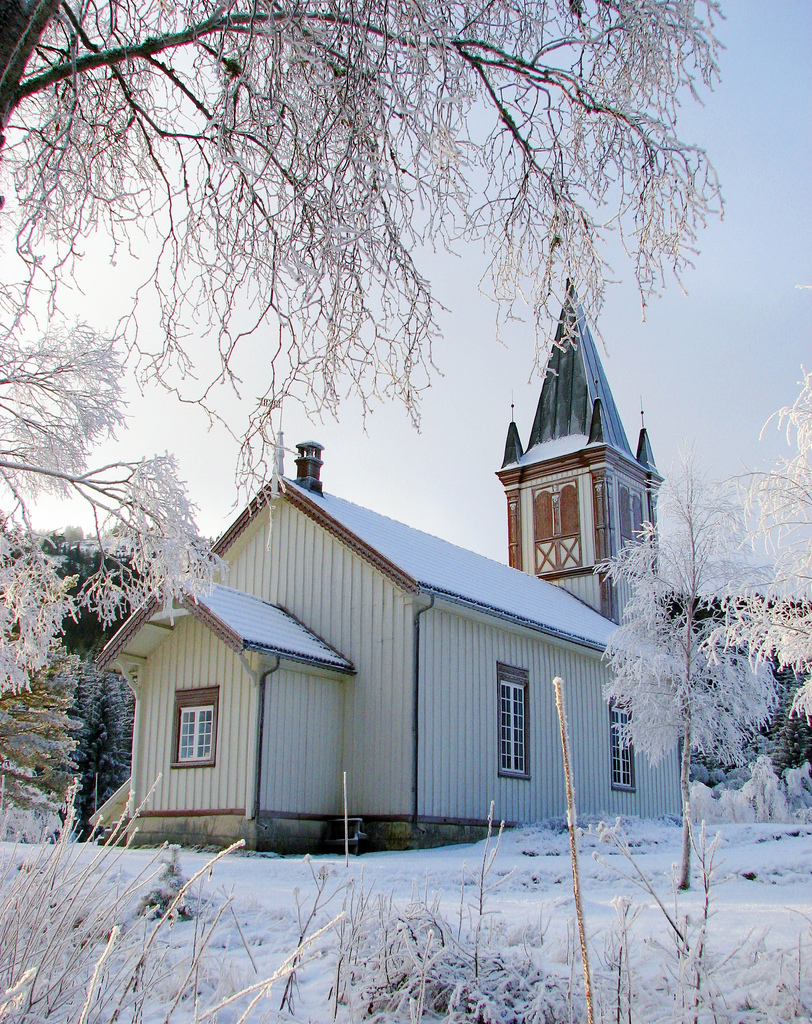
- View of the church
- Luksefjell Church
- 59°23′53″N 9°32′19″E
- Location: Skien Municipality, Telemark
- Country: Norway
- Denomination: Church of Norway
- Churchmanship: Evangelical Lutheran

History
- Former name: Luksefjell kapell
- Status: Parish church
- Founded: 1858
- Consecrated: 27 October 1858

Architecture
- Functional status: Active
- Architect: Anders Thorsen
- Architectural type: Rectangular
- Completed: 1858 (168 years ago)

Specifications
- Capacity: 104
- Materials: Wood

Administration
- Diocese: Agder og Telemark
- Deanery: Skien prosti
- Parish: Gjerpen
- Norwegian Cultural Heritage Site
- Type: Church
- Status: Not protected
- ID: 84328

Luksefjell Church (Norwegian: Luksefjell kirke) is a parish church of the Church of Norway in Skien Municipality in Telemark county, Norway. It is located in the village of Luksefjell. It is one of the churches for the Gjerpen parish which is part of the Skien prosti (deanery) in the Diocese of Agder og Telemark. The white, wooden church was built in a rectangular design in 1858 using plans drawn up by the architect Anders Thorsen. The church seats about 104 people.

== History ==
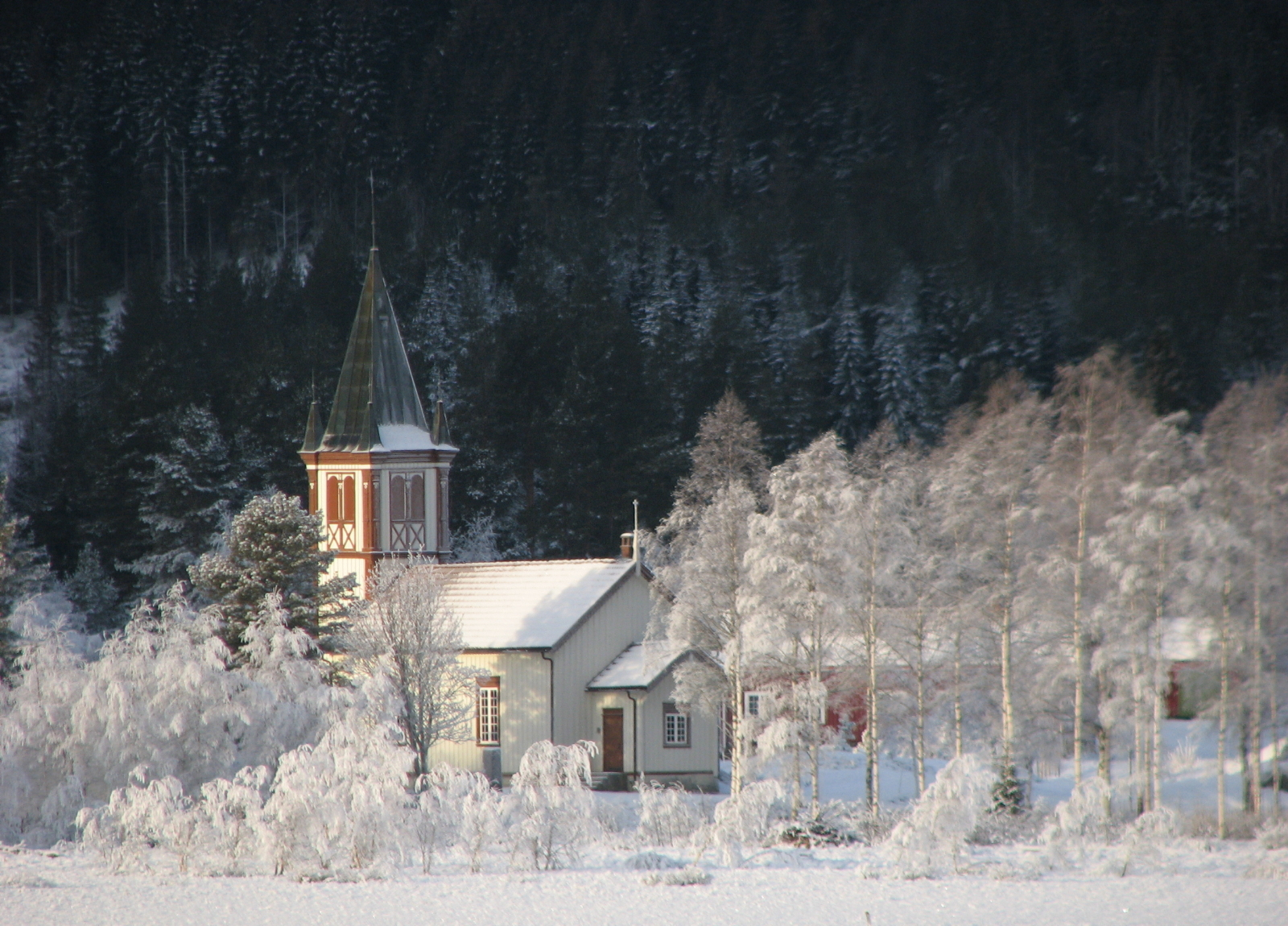
View of the church

During the Middle Ages, there was a church in Luksefjell, but it was closed centuries ago, with very little known about the building or its location. Around the mid-1800s, the residents in the rural northern part of Gjerpen Municipality wanted an annex chapel to be built in their area so they wouldn't need to travel the 20 to 25 kilometres (12 to 16 mi) to Gjerpen Church. The Løvenskiold family donated land at Luksefjell, on the shore of the lake Fjellvannet. Anders Thorsen was hired to design and build the chapel in 1858. The new chapel was consecrated on 27 October 1858. The wooden building has a rectangular design with the nave and choir in the same room. There is a sacristy in a smaller room to the east of the main room. In 1873, a new tower was built on the west end of the nave. There is a church porch under the tower. In 1948, the church was wired for electricity. In 1960, a new copper roof was installed. Around the turn of the 21st century, the chapel was made a parish church and re-named as Luksefjell Church.

== See also ==
- List of churches in Agder og Telemark
