= Grini (surname) =

Grini is a surname. Notable people with the surname include:

- Kjersti Grini (born 1971), Norwegian handball player
- Lars Grini (born 1944), Norwegian ski jumper
- Sigvart Grini (1870–1944), Norwegian farmer and politician
