= Eliassen =

Origin
- Meaning: Son of Elias
- Region of origin: Denmark, Germany, Norway

Other names
- Variant form: Eliasson

Eliassen is a Danish and Norwegian patronymic surname, literally meaning son of Elias. It may refer to:

- Arnt Eliassen (1915–2000), Norwegian meteorologist
- Grete Eliassen (born 1986), Norwegian freestyle skier
- Petter Eliassen (born 1985), Norwegian cross-country skier
- Sven G. Eliassen (born 1944), Norwegian historian
