= Sigvart =

Sigvart is a given name. Notable people with the given name include:

- Sigvart Dagsland (born 1963), Norwegian singer, pianist, and composer
- Sigvart Grini (1870–1944), Norwegian politician
- Sigvart Høgh-Nilsen (1880–?), Norwegian pianist and composer
- Sigvart Johansen (1881–1964), Norwegian rifle shooter
- Sigvart Werner (1872–1959), Danish amateur photographer
