= Odd Langholm =

Norwegian economist (1928–2024)

- Born: 8 November 1928; Haugesund, Norway
- Died: 21 September 2024 (aged 95); Bergen, Norway
- Citizenship: Norwegian
- Education: Norwegian School of Economics and Business Administration
- Awards: Honorary degree, Åbo (1992)
- Scientific career
- Fields: business administration history of economic thought
- Workplaces: Norwegian School of Economics and Business Administration professor 1966–1998

Odd Langholm (8 November 1928 – 21 September 2024) was a Norwegian economist and historian of economic thought. He spent his entire academic career at the Norwegian School of Economics and Business Administration, being a professor from 1966 to 1998.

== Background ==
Langholm was born in Haugesund on 8 November 1928, as a son of Karl Johan Langholm (1891–1974) and Anna Stampen (1894–1976), who were both teachers. He was the younger brother of historian Sivert Langholm. In 1956 he married Grethe Togstad. They settled in Bergen.

Langholm died in Bergen on 21 September 2024, at the age of 95.

== Career ==
Langholm took the examen artium in 1947 and the business school exam in 1949. He then moved from Haugesund to Bergen, to study at the Norwegian School of Economics and Business Administration. He graduated with the siv.øk. degree in 1954. For the next years he worked as a lecturer there, and took the dr.oecon. degree at the same institution in 1964, on the thesis Tidshorisonten for deterministiske planleggingsmodeller i normativ bedriftsøkonomikk. He was the first person to take both the siv.øk. degree and the doctorate at the Norwegian School of Economics and Business Administration. He was promoted to professor in 1966.

After 1969 his focus shifted from business administration towards the study of mediaeval economic thought. Between 1979 and 1998 he published five works in this field, many derived from sources in Latin, a language in which he was skilled. These works were Price and Value in the Aristotelian Tradition. A Study in Scholastic Economic Sources (1979), Wealth and Money in the Aristotelian Tradition (1983), The Aristotelian Analyses of Usury (1984), Economics in the Medieval Schools. Wealth, Exchange, Value, Money and Usury according to the Paris Theological Tradition, 1200–1350 (1992) and The Legacy of Scholasticism in Economic Thought. Antecedents of Choice and Power (1998). This body of work has given him international recognition.

He received an honorary degree at the Åbo Akademi University in 1992. For his 60th birthday, a Festschrift was issued. He retired from his professorship in 1998.

== Works ==
=== Books ===
- Price and Value in the Aristotelian Tradition: A Study in Scholastic Economic Sources. Universitetsforlaget. 1979. ISBN 8200018407.
- Wealth and Money in the Aristotelian Tradition. Universitetsforlaget. 1983. ISBN 8200067505.
- The Aristotelian Analyses of Usury. Universitetsforlaget. 1984. ISBN 8200072908.
- Economics in the Medieval Schools: Wealth, Exchange, Value, Money and Usury according to the Paris Theological Tradition, 1200–1350. Brill. 1992. ISBN 9004094229.
- The Legacy of Scholasticism in Economic Thought: Antecedents of Choice and Power. Cambridge University Press. 1998. ISBN 0521621593.
