= Gjerpen Municipality =

Former municipality in Norway

Gjerpen Municipality Gjerpen herred
- Former municipality
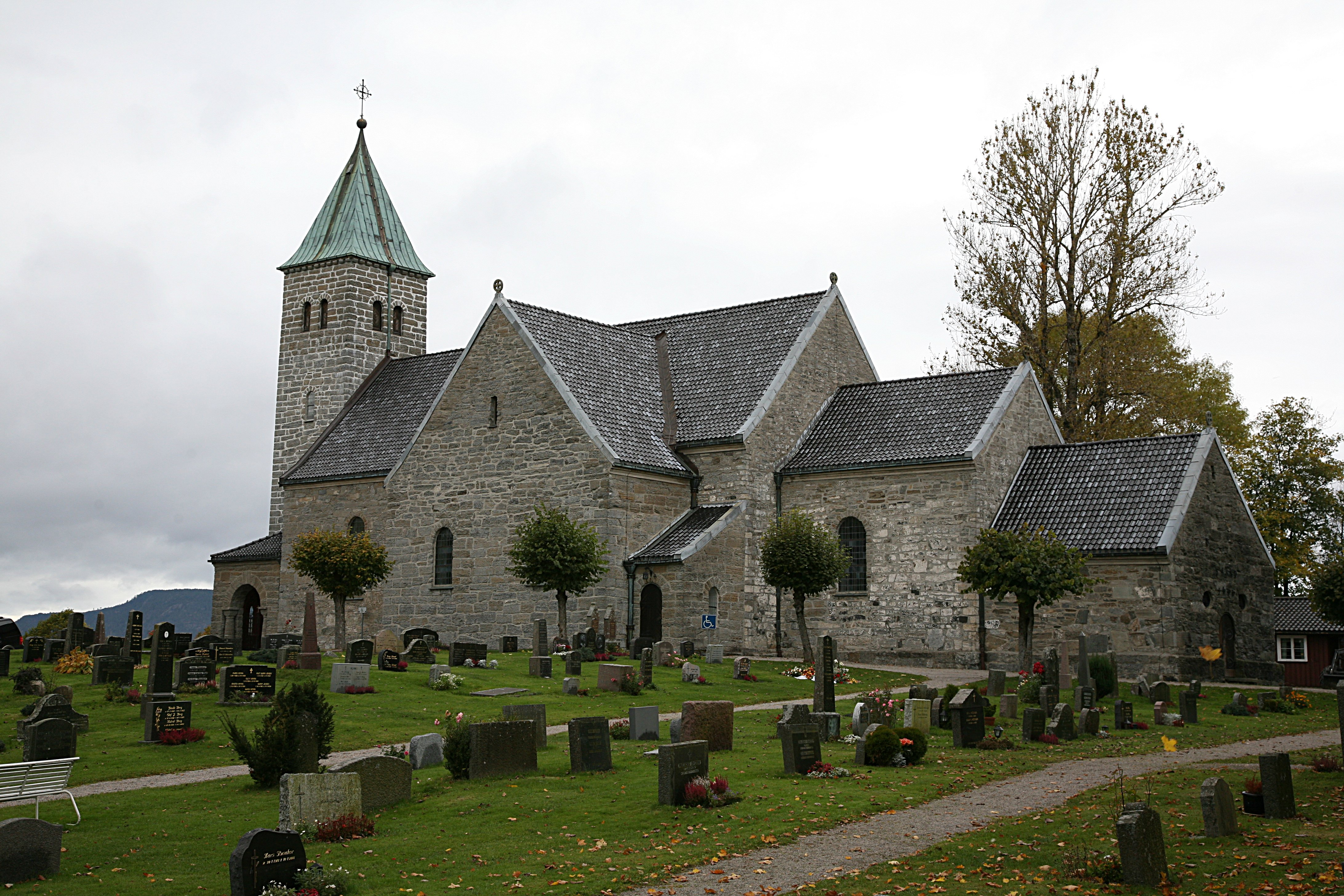
- View of the local Gjerpen Church

- Telemark within Norway

- Gjerpen within Telemark
- Coordinates: 59°13′27″N 9°36′28″E
- Country: Norway
- County: Telemark
- District: Grenland
- Established: 1 Jan 1838
  - Created as: Formannskapsdistrikt
- Disestablished: 1 Jan 1964
  - Succeeded by: Skien Municipality
- Administrative centre: Gjerpen

Government
  - Mayor (1960–1963): Oskar Skilbred (Ap)

Area (upon dissolution)
  - Total: 379.5 km^{2} (146.5 sq mi)
  - Rank: #238 in Norway
- Highest elevation (Skåråfjell): 812.62 m (2,666.1 ft)

Population (1963)
  - Total: 15,192
  - Rank: #27 in Norway
  - Density: 40/km^{2} (100/sq mi)
  - Change (10 years): ▲ +22.4%
- Demonym: Gjerpasokning

Official language
  - Norwegian form: Neutral
- Time zone: UTC+01:00 (CET)
  - Summer (DST): UTC+02:00 (CEST)
- ISO 3166 code: NO-0812

Gjerpen (Norwegian pronunciation: [ˈjæɾpən̩]) is a former municipality in Telemark county, Norway. The 379.5-square-kilometre (146.5 sq mi) municipality existed from 1838 until its dissolution in 1964. The area is now part of Skien Municipality in the traditional district of Grenland. The administrative centre was the village of Gjerpen, which is now part of the growing town of Skien. Gjerpen Church was the main church for the municipality. Gjerpen Municipality was located east and north of the town of Skien. It encompassed districts such as Borgestad, Bøle, Gulset, and Luksefjell.

Prior to its dissolution in 1964, the 379.5-square-kilometre (146.5 sq mi) municipality was the 238th largest by area out of the 689 municipalities in Norway. Gjerpen Municipality was the 27th most populous municipality in Norway with a population of about 15,192. The municipality's population density was 40 inhabitants per square kilometre (100/sq mi) and its population had increased by 22.4% over the previous 10-year period.

== General information ==
=== Administrative history ===
The formannskapsdistrikt law of 1837 created a system of local government in Norway by establishing each town (ladested or kjøpstad) and each Church of Norway prestegjeld as a civil municipality. On 1 January 1838, Gjerpen prestegjeld was established as Gjerpen Municipality. According to the 1835 census, Gjerpen prestegjeld had a population of 4,381.

On 1 January 1856, an area of Gjerpen Municipality (population: 1,286) was transferred into the neighboring Skien Municipality. On 1 January 1903, an unpopulated area of Saude Municipality was transferred into Gjerpen Municipality. Again, on 1 July 1916, another area of Gjerpen Municipality (population: 1,332) was transferred into the neighboring Skien Municipality. Then on 1 July 1920, an area of southern Gjerpen Municipality (population: 437) was transferred into the neighboring Porsgrunn Municipality.

During the 1960s, there were many municipal mergers across Norway due to the work of the Schei Committee. On 1 January 1964, Gjerpen Municipality was dissolved and the following areas were merged to form an enlarged Skien Municipality:

- all of Gjerpen Municipality (population: 15,300)
- all of Skien Municipality (population: 15,805)
- all of Solum Municipality (population: 13,706)
- the Valebø area of Holla Municipality (population: 259)

=== Name ===
The municipality is named after the old Gjerpen prestegjeld. The prestegjeld was named after the old Gjerpen farm (Old Norse: Gerpin; a corruption of Garpvin) since the first Gjerpen Church was built there. The meaning of the first element is unknown. It is possibly the old name of a local river. The river name may have been derived from the word gǫrp which means "the chattering one" or "the chuckling one", likely referring to the noise of the river. The last element is vin which means "meadow" or "pasture".

=== Churches ===
The Church of Norway had one parish (sokn) within Gjerpen Municipality. At the time of the municipal dissolution, it was part of the Gjerpen prestegjeld and the Skien prosti (deanery) in the Diocese of Agder.

Churches in Gjerpen Municipality
Parish (sokn)	Church name	Location of the church	Year built
Gjerpen	Gjerpen Church	Gjerpen	1153
Gjerpen	Borgestad Chapel	Borgestad	1907
Gjerpen	Luksefjell Chapel	Luksefjell	1858

== Geography ==
The highest point in the municipality was the 812.62-metre (2,666.1 ft) tall mountain Skåråfjell, near the northern border with Sauherad Municipality. Ytre Sandsvær Municipality (in Buskerud county) was located to the north, Siljan Municipality was located to the east, Eidanger Municipality was located to the southeast, Porsgrunn Municipality was located to the south, Solum Municipality and Skien Municipality were located to the southwest, Holla Municipality was located to the west, and Sauherad Municipality was located to the northwest.

== Government ==
While it existed, Gjerpen Municipality was responsible for primary education (through 10th grade), outpatient health services, senior citizen services, welfare and other social services, zoning, economic development, and municipal roads and utilities. The municipality was governed by a municipal council of directly elected representatives. The mayor was indirectly elected by a vote of the municipal council. The municipality was under the jurisdiction of the Gjerpen District Court and the Agder Court of Appeal.

=== Municipal council ===
The municipal council (Herredsstyre) of Gjerpen Municipality was made up of representatives that were elected to four year terms. The tables below show the historical composition of the council by political party.

Gjerpen herredsstyre 1959–1963
Party name (in Norwegian)	Number of representatives
Labour Party (Arbeiderpartiet)	25
Conservative Party (Høyre)	4
Communist Party (Kommunistiske Parti)	3
Christian Democratic Party (Kristelig Folkeparti)	6
Centre Party (Senterpartiet)	2
Liberal Party (Venstre)	9
Total number of members:	49
Note: On 1 January 1964, Gjerpen Municipality became part of Skien Municipality.

Gjerpen herredsstyre 1955–1959
Party name (in Norwegian)	Number of representatives
Labour Party (Arbeiderpartiet)	25
Conservative Party (Høyre)	3
Communist Party (Kommunistiske Parti)	4
Christian Democratic Party (Kristelig Folkeparti)	6
Farmers' Party (Bondepartiet)	2
Liberal Party (Venstre)	9
Total number of members:	49

Gjerpen herredsstyre 1951–1955
Party name (in Norwegian)	Number of representatives
Labour Party (Arbeiderpartiet)	17
Conservative Party (Høyre)	2
Communist Party (Kommunistiske Parti)	4
Christian Democratic Party (Kristelig Folkeparti)	6
Farmers' Party (Bondepartiet)	2
Liberal Party (Venstre)	9
Total number of members:	40

Gjerpen herredsstyre 1947–1951
Party name (in Norwegian)	Number of representatives
Labour Party (Arbeiderpartiet)	14
Conservative Party (Høyre)	2
Communist Party (Kommunistiske Parti)	6
Christian Democratic Party (Kristelig Folkeparti)	5
Farmers' Party (Bondepartiet)	2
Liberal Party (Venstre)	11
Total number of members:	40

Gjerpen herredsstyre 1945–1947
Party name (in Norwegian)	Number of representatives
Labour Party (Arbeiderpartiet)	14
Conservative Party (Høyre)	2
Communist Party (Kommunistiske Parti)	8
Christian Democratic Party (Kristelig Folkeparti)	7
Farmers' Party (Bondepartiet)	1
Joint list of the Liberal Party (Venstre) and the Radical People's Party (Radikale Folkepartiet)	8
Total number of members:	40

Gjerpen herredsstyre 1937–1941*
Party name (in Norwegian)	Number of representatives
Labour Party (Arbeiderpartiet)	19
Farmers' Party (Bondepartiet)	3
Liberal Party (Venstre)	14
Joint list of the Conservative Party (Høyre) and the Free-minded People's Party (Frisinnede Folkeparti)	4
Total number of members:	40
Note: Due to the German occupation of Norway during World War II, no elections were held for new municipal councils until after the war ended in 1945.

=== Mayors ===
The mayor (Norwegian: ordfører) of Gjerpen Municipality was the political leader of the municipality and the chairperson of the municipal council. The following people have held this position:

- 1838–1841: Herman Bagger
- 1841–1843: Christen Lund
- 1843–1853: Gunder Arnesen Augestad
- 1853–1856: Fredrik C.S. Borchsenius
- 1856–1857: Just Wright Grøndahl
- 1857–1859: Fredrik C.S. Borchsenius
- 1859–1869: Erik Johan Cappelen
- 1869–1886: Mathias Engebretsen Øvrom
- 1886–1895: Gunnar Knudsen (V)
- 1896–1898: Leopold Løvenskiold
- 1898–1898: Ole Kristian Høisæt
- 1899–1901: Gunnar Knudsen (V)
- 1902–1904: Hans Nilsen Riis
- 1905–1905: Gunnar Sem
- 1905–1908: Gunnar Knudsen (V)
- 1908–1910: Lars Eriksen Ballestad
- 1911–1912: Gunnar Knudsen (V)
- 1912–1919: Lars Eriksen Ballestad
- 1920–1925: Ole Andreasen Oredalen
- 1926–1928: Sigvart Grini (Bp)
- 1929–1935: Christen Knudsen
- 1935–1937: Lars Andersen Hovland
- 1937–1941: Tollef Stensrud (Ap)
- 1941–1945: Simon Simonsen (NS)
- 1945–1945: Tollef Stensrud (Ap)
- 1946–1959: Olav Thorbjørnsson Vegheim (Ap)
- 1959–1959: Ingar Augestad (Ap)
- 1960–1963: Oskar Skilbred (Ap)

== Attractions ==
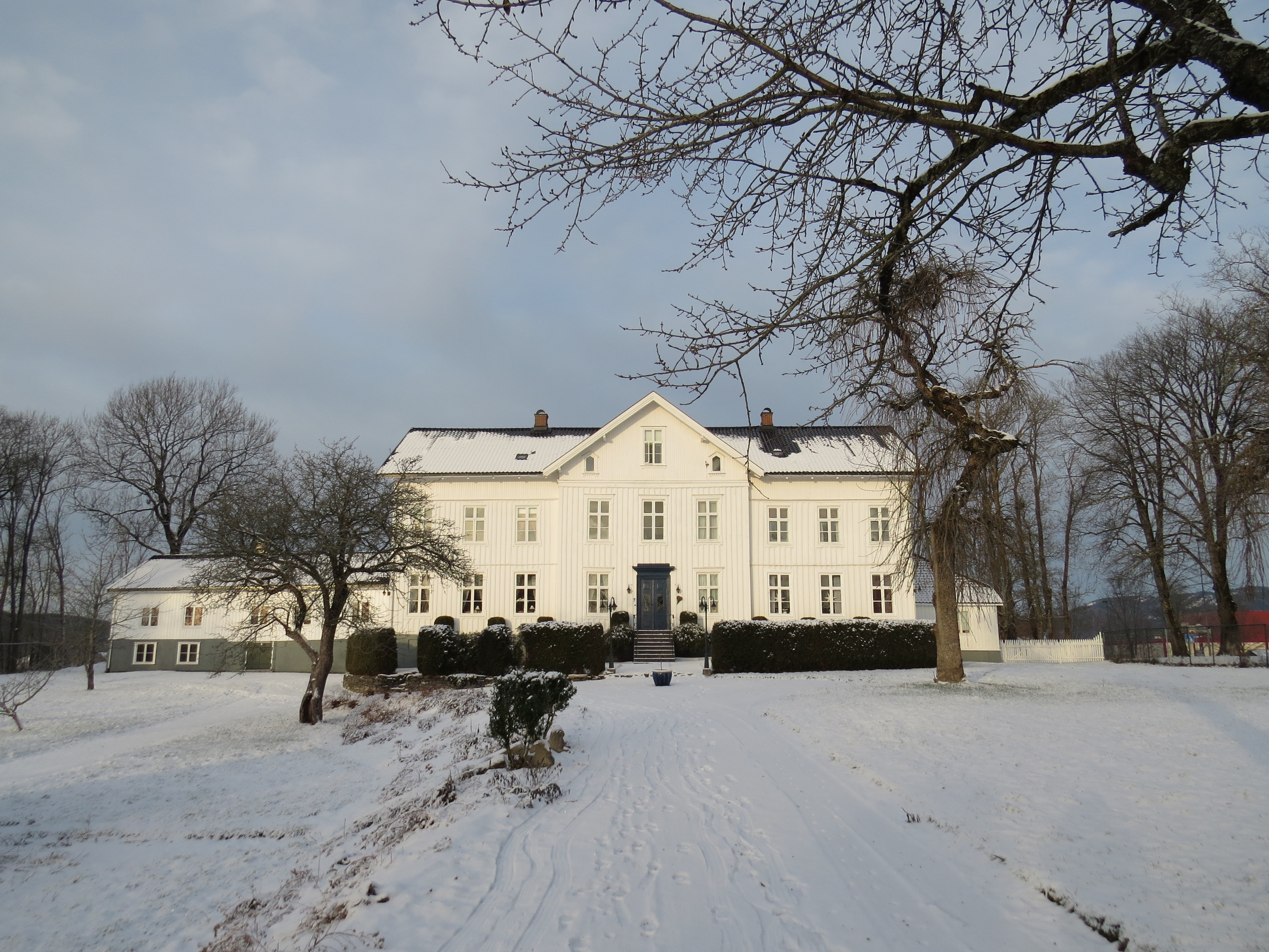
Mæla Gård in Gjerpen

Gjerpen Church (Gjerpen Kirke) is one of the oldest churches in Norway, dating from around the year 1150. Vidkun Quisling was buried in the Gjerpen cemetery.

Mæla Manor (Mæla gård i Gjerpen) was the residence of merchant Diderich von Cappelen (1734–1794) and his first wife Petronelle Pedersdatter Juel (1737–1785). It was the childhood home of their sons Ulrich Fredrich von Cappelen, Diderik von Cappelen, and Peder von Cappelen. The former manor house is now operated as an auction facility (Nye Store Mæla Gård Auktion).

Fossum Ironworks (Fossum Jernverk), which was in operation from 1539 from 1869, was last owned by the Løvenskiold family. Løvenskiold-Vækerø, which is one of Norway's largest forest owners, owns and manages the large forest estate which formerly belonged to the Fossum Ironworks

== Notable people ==
- T. E. Sorenson, Minnesota state senator; born in Gjerpen

== See also ==
- List of former municipalities of Norway
