= Aud Kvalbein =

Norwegian politician

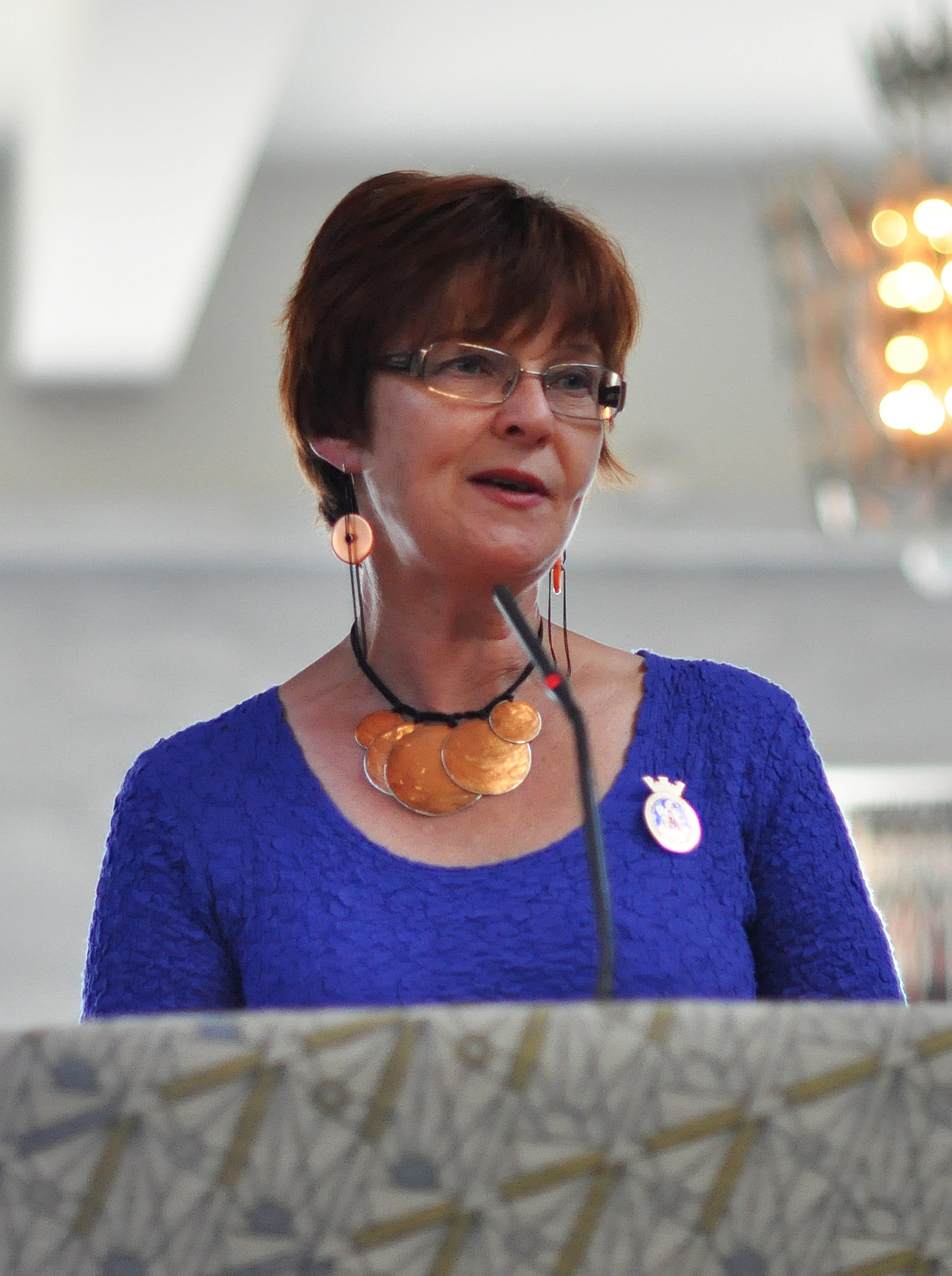
Aud Kvalbein in 2011

Aud Kvalbein (born 4 May 1948) is a Norwegian politician for the Christian Democratic Party.

She served as a deputy representative to the Norwegian Parliament from Oslo during the terms 2001–2005 and 2005–2009. From 1997 to 2000, during the first cabinet Bondevik, Kvalbein was a political advisor in the Ministry of Foreign Affairs.

On the local level, she was first elected to Oslo city council in 2003. Following the 2007 elections, she became deputy mayor. She had previously served as a deputy representative from 1975 to 1979 and 1995 to 2003.

Before entering full-time politics, she worked mainly with journalism. From 1990 to 1997 she worked as head of information in her party.
