= Leiv Kristen Sydnes =

Norwegian chemist (born 1948)

Leiv Kristen Sydnes (born 9 July 1948) is a Norwegian chemist, specializing in organic chemistry.

He was born in Haugesund, and took his education at the University of Oslo. He has the dr.philos. degree from 1978. He was hired as an associate professor at the University of Tromsø in 1978, and was later promoted to professor. In 1993, he moved to the University of Bergen. He presided over the Norwegian Chemical Society from 1992 to 1996 and the International Union of Pure and Applied Chemistry (IUPAC) from 2004 to 2005. He is a member of the Norwegian Academy of Science and Letters and the Norwegian Academy of Technological Sciences.

Sydnes stood for election as rector of the University of Bergen in 2005, but lost the election to Sigmund Grønmo. In 2009, he applied for the position as rector of the Norwegian University of Science and Technology; here the rectors are hired rather than elected.
