= Sorb apple =

Sorb apple may refer to several trees, or their fruits, in the genus Sorbus:

- Sorbus domestica, the true service tree
- Sorbus aucuparia, the rowan
- Sorbus torminalis, the wild service tree
