= Helge Karlsen =

Norwegian footballer (born 1948)

Personal information
- Date of birth: 29 June 1948 (age 78)
- Place of birth: Bergen, Norway
- Position: Defender

Senior career*
Years	Team	Apps	(Gls)
1967–1979	Brann	180	(7)

International career
1975	Norway U21	1	(0)
1973–1979	Norway	35	(0)
- * Club domestic league appearances and goals

Helge Karlsen (born 29 June 1948) is a Norwegian former footballer who played as a defender for SK Brann in the Norwegian Premier League from 1967 to 1979. He played 237 games totally for Brann, and 180 of them was in the league. In 1972 and 1976 he won the Norwegian Football Cup with Brann. He was immortalized in the famous SK Brann song "Vi è de beste" by Ove Thue in which he has his own verse.

Helge Karlsen played 35 games for the Norway national team.
