= Inga Ravna Eira =

Northern Sami language poet, children's writer, translator and schoolteacher from Norway

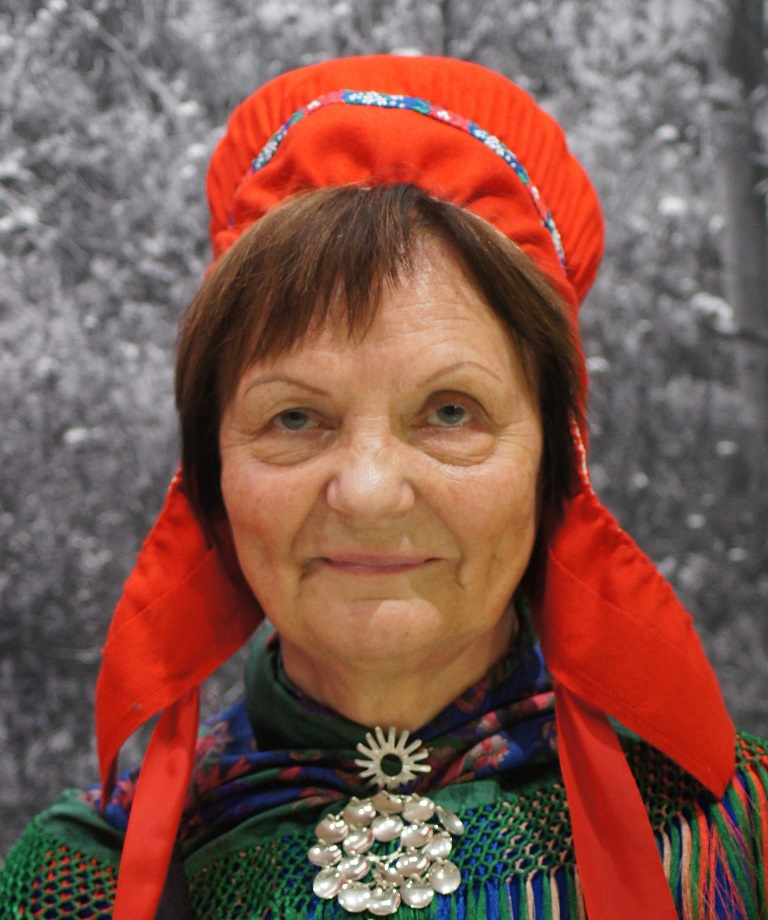
- Born: 30 May 1948 (age 78); Karasjok, Norway
- Occupations: Schoolteacher, writer and translator

Inga Ravna Eira (born 30 May 1948) is a Norwegian Northern Sami language poet, children's writer, translator and schoolteacher from Norway.

== Career ==
Eira was born in Karasjok Municipality (Kárášjohka (Northern Sami)), in Finnmark, Norway. A schoolteacher, her first children's book, Sámi girječálliid searvi from 1979 was written as a collaboration with her pupils. Her first published poetry was included in the anthology Savdnjiluvvon nagir (1989), jointly with Kaia Nilsen and Ellen Marie Vars. Her second children's book, Mellet from 1992, was illustrated by Iver Jåks. Her first poetry collection was Lieđážan from 1997, with illustrations by Maj-Lis Skaltje. In 2009 she published the poetry collection was eadni ganjaldii mu fuolppuid. Her poetry collection Ii dát leat dat eana from 2018 has illustrations by Mathis Nango, and was nominated to the Nordic Council Literature Prize from the Sami language area in 2019 for her poetry collection entitled Gáhttára Iđit.

Eira has been leader of Sámi girječálliid searvi, the Sami writers' union.
