= Pål Benum =

Norwegian long-distance runner (1935–2021)

Personal information
- Born: 3 August 1935 Verdal Municipality, Norway
- Died: 23 September 2021 (aged 86) Trondheim, Norway

Sport
- Sport: Track and field
- Event: Long-distance running

Pål Sverre Benum (3 August 1935 – 23 September 2021) was a Norwegian long-distance runner. He specialized in the longest track distances, 5000 and 10,000 metres, eventually competing at the 1964 Olympic Games. He also competed in cross-country running. On the track he became national champion three times, in addition to nine titles in cross-country. After his active career he became a professor of medicine.

== Athletic career ==
He was born in Verdal Municipality as an older brother of historian Edgeir Benum. He moved to Oslo and represented the club IL i BUL. His personal best times were 8:09.6 in the 3000 metres (1964), 9:19.2 in the 3000 metre steeplechase (1963), 14:06.6 in the 5000 metres (1964) and 29:13.6 in the 10,000 metres (1964). In middle distance races he had 1:54.8 in the 800 metres (1959), 3:47.6 in the 1500 metres (1959) and 4:13.1 in the mile run (1959).

His only international outing came at the 1964 Summer Olympics, where he placed nineteenth in the 10,000 metres. On the track he became Norwegian champion in the 5000 metres in 1962 and 1964. He also won a bronze medal in 1959 and silver in 1961. He won the 10,000 metres in 1963 ahead of reigning champion Magnar Lundemo, and then took a bronze medal in 1964. By 1964/1965, his teammate and competitor Thor Helland had established himself as dominant in the 5000 and 10,000 metres in Norway.

Benum also co-held the Norwegian club record in the 4 x 1500 metres relay. With his club IL i BUL he broke IK Tjalve's record in September 1958 at Bislett stadion with the time of 15:53.4 minutes. Benum and BUL later smashed their own record, clocking in 15:40.0 in July 1959 at the same track. Tjalve later reclaimed it with the time 15:28.4 in 1965.

Benum dominated Norwegian cross-country running in the early 1960s. He won the 3 kilometre cross-country championship in 1959, 1962, 1963 and 1964 and took the silver in 1961. In the now-defunct 8 kilometre event he won Norwegian titles in 1962, 1963 and 1964. He also won the road relay Holmenkollstafetten with IL i BUL.

As a teenager, Benum was also a decent speed skater with personal bests of 49.1 in the 500 metres (1954), 2.38.8 in the 1500 metres (1952).

== Medical career ==
Unlike his brother who became a professor of history, Benum studied medicine in Oslo and Bergen. He took the doctorate, the dr.med. degree, in 1974 and specialized in orthopedics. From 1982 he was a professor of medicine at the St. Olav Hospital, connected to the Norwegian University of Science and Technology. Here he headed the Orthopedics Department for many years, and for his achievements he was decorated as a Knight, First Class of the Order of St. Olav in 2006. He was a fellow of the Norwegian Academy of Technological Sciences.
