= Steinar Tjomsland =

Norwegian judge

Steinar Tjomsland (born 23 July 1948) is a former Norwegian Supreme Court Justice.

He was born in Kristiansand, and graduated from the University of Oslo as cand.jur. He worked as assisting director of Norges Bank from 1989 to 1991.

Since 1991 he has been a Supreme Court Justice.
