= Morten M. Kristiansen =

Norwegian illustrator (born 1948)

- Born: 30 May 1948 (age 77); Oslo, Norway
- Education: Westerdals reklameskole
- Occupation: Illustrator

Morten M. Kristiansen (born 30 May 1948) is a Norwegian illustrator, known by his signature Morten M. He was born in Oslo.

In the 1970s, he created political cartoons to the newspapers Nationen, Dag og Tid and Ny Tid. He also contributed to the humour magazine KOnK. From 1979 to 2011 he worked as illustrator for the newspaper Verdens Gang. Among his books are Om badecar og andre... from 1979, Tjaså..? from 1982, Tjasså! from 1987, and Ute alene from 2003. He is represented at the National Gallery of Norway, Riksgalleriet and other art galleries.
