= Kjell Arne Bratli =

Norwegian writer

Kjell Arne Bratli, Parliamentary Commissioner for the Norwegian Armed Forces 2006–2014. Military officer and author. Captain RNoN. Served at sea, land and in special service. In the 1980s he travelled behind Soviet lines in Afghanistan.

Captain Bratli played a key role in building Rapid Response Information Teams in the NATO Alliance and NATO APIC (Allied Press and Information Centres), as well as modernizing the Norwegian Navy P&I units. He is an active member of the Norwegian Reserve Officer Federation as well as in the CIOR (the NATO reservist organization). He is a former editor in the daily press and military periodicals, a former member of the board of the Atlantic Committee and Member of DCAF Director's advisory board.

Bratli was appointed and served as special adviser to the Presidium of the Norwegian Parliament before being elected to the high office of Military Commissioner.

He has written more than twenty books. Many about Military and Naval History, National Security, Christianity and Golf. In 2013 Bratli bought the Kurud estate, with a private golf course, Gjersjoen, near Oslo, Norway. Bratli is a member of the prestigious Royal and Ancient Golf Club of St. Andrews.

== Select bibliography ==
- Norway's Security and European Foreign Policy for the 1980s. 1979
- Kåre Willoch - Our New Prime Minister. 1981
- Horten's Sports Club Through 125 Years. 1985
- Behind the Open Door. 1986
- The Last Years. An account from a Naval Yard. 1986
- From the Golden Horn to the Trade Union Battle. 1990
- 100 years of private banking, Horten. 1991
- Year of Golf. 1993
- Naval Officer and Pillar of Society. 1994
- How to Become a Golfer. 1995
- Korsets Vei - en beretning om Smiths Venner. 1995
- The Way Of The Cross. Canada, USA, England. 1996
- Der Weg des Kreuzes. Germany, Austria, Switzerland. 1996
- Een Levenskrachtige Gemeente. Holland 1996
- Birdie - Golf Madness (Birdie - Golfens Glade Galskaper). 1996
- Voyage to Heaven's Coast. 1997
- The Great Book of Golf. 1997
- Oh, Pharao, What a Shot! 1997
- Operation Bagdad. 1998
- Soldier of the Lord. 1998
- The Destroyer "Sleipner" 1940-45.1999
- Borre Golf Club. 1999
- Fighting for HM the King. The Royal Norwegian Navy 1940-45. 2000
- Paradise Right Ahead. 2000
- Day by Day. Royal Norwegian Navy 1814-2000. 2001. (Producer)
- The Ombudsman for the Armed Forces 1952-2002
- Ramsund Naval Station. 2003
- A servant of the Lord. 2003
- Driving Forces - Horten College of Engineering 1855-2005. 2005
- The Lord's Shepherd. 2007

== See also ==
- Parliamentary Ombudsman
