= Gunnar Steintveit =

Norwegian lawyer and judge (born 1948)

Gunnar Steintveit (born 16 June 1948) is a Norwegian lawyer and judge.

He studied at the University of Grenoble and did his compulsory military service from 1966 to 1968. He then attended the University of Oslo, graduating with a cand.jur. degree in 1976. He was a consultant in the Ministry of the Transport and Communications for two years, and deputy judge in Nordre Sunnmøre from 1978 to 1980. He worked as a lawyer in two different firms from 1980 to 1984, and then in Bergen Bank for two years. In 1987 he was appointed as district stipendiary magistrate in Nordfjord. Since 2007 he also leads the Norwegian Appeals Board for Health Personnel, a government agency, having been deputy leader from 2005 to 2007.
