= Kenneth Hugdahl =

Norwegian psychologist

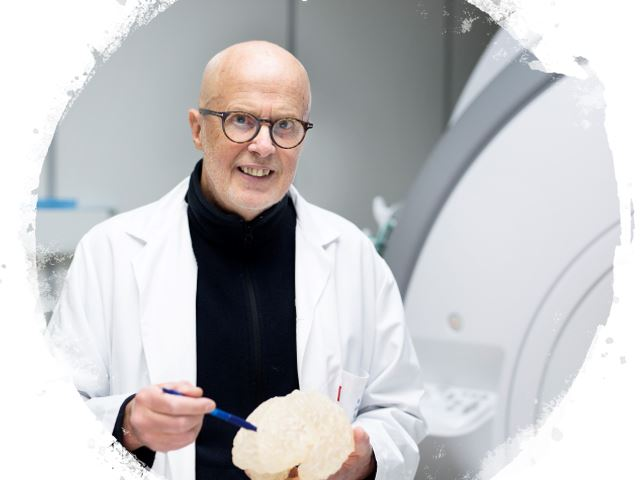

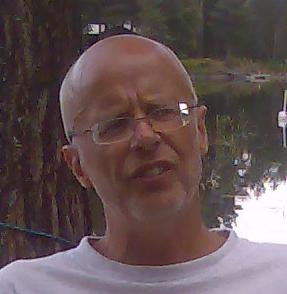
Kenneth Hugdahl

Kenneth Hugdahl (born 15 January 1948, in Östersund, Sweden), married to Märit 1973–2016, two children Anna and Emilia. He is a Norwegian psychologist and cognitive neuroscientist, and Professor emeritus at the University of Bergen, Norway, https://www4.uib.no/finn-ansatte/Kenneth.Hugdahl

He has a doctor degree (PhD) from the Uppsala University in 1977. He worked as a researcher there from 1980, and in 1984 he was appointed professor at the University of Bergen. His main research interests are brain asymmetry and dichotic listening, cognitive dysfunction in schizophrenia, and neurobiology of auditory hallucinations. He has published more than 400 articles in international peer-reviewed journals, including in high impact factor journals, such as Brain (journal) and Proceedings of the National Academy of Sciences of the United States of America, and various books, among them Psychophysiology: The Mind-Body Perspective (1995), Experimental Methods in Neuropsychology (2002) and The Asymmetrical Brain (2002) (together with Prof. Richard Davidson). He also edited the Scandinavian Journal of Psychology from 1990 to 2004.

He was a member of the Research Council of Norway from 1988 to 1989, and of the MacArthur Foundation Mind-Body Network from 1990 to 2000. He is a member of the Norwegian Academy of Science and Letters., Finnish Academy of Science and Letters since 2002,https://acadsci.fi/en/members/, Academia Europae, 2024, https://www.ae-info.org/, and Honorary Doctor at the University of Turku, Finland, 2009. He is founder and former Head of the Bergen fMRI Group which initiated use of functional magnetic resonance imaging in neuroscience in Norway and the Nordic countries in the 1990s, https://www4.uib.no/en/research/research-groups/bergen-fmri-group.
