= Sigvart Grini =

Norwegian politician (1870–1944)

Nils Sigvart Hansen Grini (19 February 1870 – 14 May 1944) was a Norwegian farmer and politician for the Agrarian Party.

== Biography ==
He was born at Grini in Gjerpen Municipality as a son of farmers Hans Martin Danielsen Grini (1839–1907) and Anne Helvig Gulliksdatter (1845–1918). He was a brother of editor Daniel Grini. His niece married Sverre Kjeldstadli, and mothered Knut Kjeldstadli. He worked at the family farm for his entire life, having taken it over in 1907.

He was a member of the municipal council of Gjerpen Municipality from 1904 to 1910 and 1913 to 1928, serving as mayor from 1925 to 1928. He served as a deputy representative to the Parliament of Norway from Telemark during the terms 1928–1930 and 1931–1933, and became a regular member from 1932 to 1933 while filling in for Jens Hundseid who was Prime Minister.

In Gjerpen he also chaired the school board from 1905 to 1910. He chaired the local agrarian association, the rifle association and the youth association. He was a board member of the local savings bank and a supervisory council member of Felleskjøpet. He manager the Bank of Norway department in Skien from 1927 to 1942. He died in May 1944.
