= Luksefjell =

Village in Skien Municipality, Norway

- Village
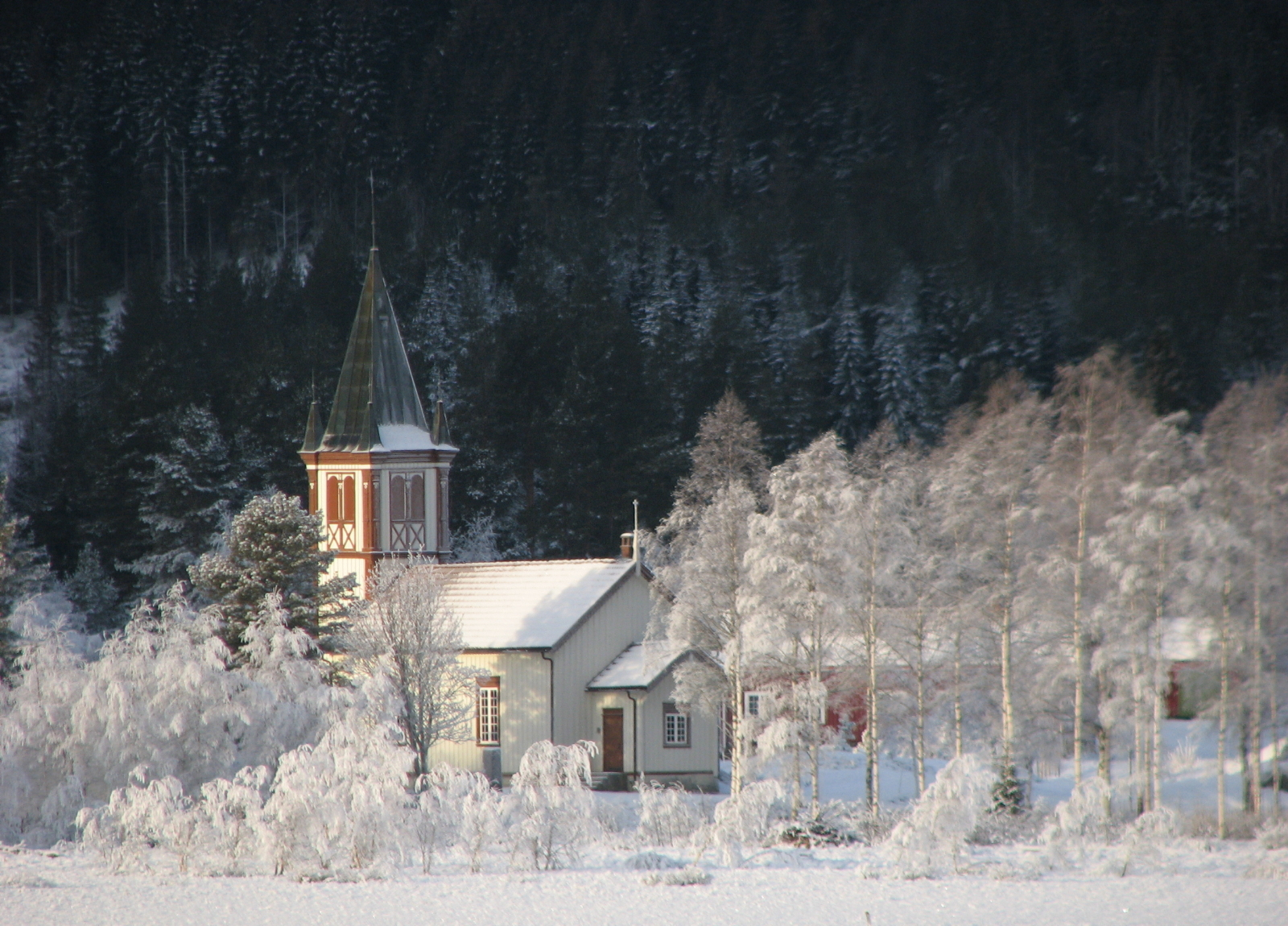
- View of the village church
- Interactive map of Luksefjell
- Coordinates: 59.39995°N 9.53464°E
- Country: Norway
- Region: Eastern Norway
- County: Telemark
- District: Grenland
- Municipality: Skien Municipality
- Elevation: 288 m (945 ft)
- Time zone: UTC+01:00 (CET)
  - Summer (DST): UTC+02:00 (CEST)
- Post Code: 3721 Skien

Luksefjell is a village in Skien Municipality in Telemark county, Norway. The village is located about 20 kilometres (12 mi) to the north of the village of Hoppestad and about 25 kilometres (16 mi) north of the town of Skien. The rural village has about few permanent residents, but it has a number of holiday cottages. Luksefjell Church is located in the village. The area is known for its plentiful hiking activities.
