= Norwegian Parliamentary Ombudsman for the Armed Forces =

The Norwegian Parliamentary Ombudsman for the Armed Forces (Norwegian: Ombudsmannen for Forsvaret) is an etat subordinate to the Norwegian Parliament. The Parliamentary Ombudsman for the Armed Forces was established in 1952, as the world's first parliamentary military ombudsman. Its purpose is to "safeguard the rights of all members of the Armed Forces", allowing individuals to bring their cases forward should they need to.

The Ombudsman and the Ombudsman's committee is an organ of the Storting (the Norwegian Parliament) and part of the Parliament's oversight- and supervisory activities. The Ombudsman and the Ombudsman's committee are elected by and reports to the Parliament.

The Ombudsman shall safeguard the rights of all members (and former members) of the Armed Forces. Anyone who feels that he or she has been wrongly, unjustly or unreasonably treated can bring his or her case before the Ombudsman and request him to investigate the matter to determine whether an injustice has been done, and if it has, to see to it that corrective action is taken.

All sorts of issues and circumstances arising from military service can at any given time - before, during or after time of service - be brought to the attention of the Ombudsman. The Ombudsman's committee submits annual reports to the Storting. The Ombudsman may however at any time report a matter to Parliament. The Ombudsman acts as an advisor to the Storting, to the Ministry of Defence and to the Chief of Defence on matters within his sphere of competence.

In its role as independent military oversight mechanism the Ombudsman's committee inspects military units home and abroad. The Ombudsman submits inspection reports with proper recommendations to the MOD, Chief of Defence and military authorities involved.

The Ombudsman may address or take actions on his own initiative in any matter which comes to his attention. He is empowered to deal with cases involving all authorities, has access to all documents and information and may hear witnesses and experts. The Ombudsman is impartial and independent of the Minister for Defence, the Ministry of Defence and the Military Authorities. The Ombudsman's committee consists of seven members and is headed by the Ombudsman. The Office of the Ombudsman for the Armed Forces is led by the Ombudsman. His administration is headed by the Director (the senior administrative manager).

== Ombudsmen ==
- Kjell Arne Bratli (2006–2014)
- Roald Linaker (2014– )
