= Knut Magne Myrland =

Norwegian singer, guitarist, and songwriter (1948–2021)

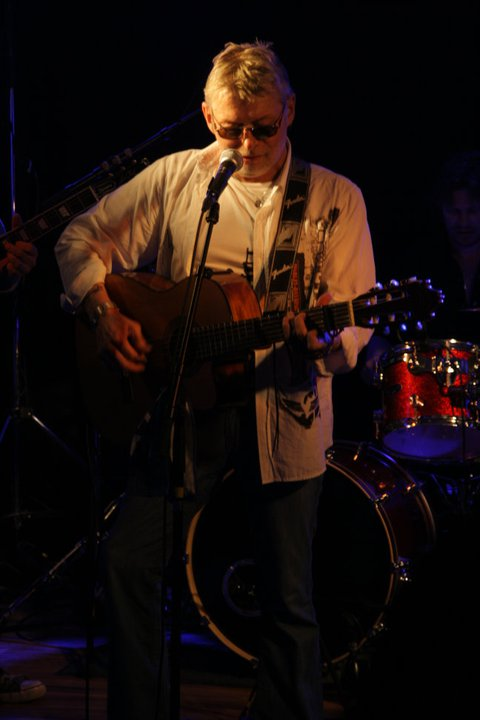
- Born: 23 March 1948; Harstad, Norway
- Died: 24 April 2021 (aged 73)
- Occupations: Singer and songwriter

Knut Magne Myrland (23 March 1948 – 24 April 2021) was a Norwegian singer, guitarist and songwriter.

== Career ==
Born in Harstad, Myrland worked as a sailor, but had to end this career due to injuries from an accident. He started a new career as musician, and his first album was Isbål from 1976. Further albums are Gjengrodd sti (1977) and 78° nord (1978). His album Morild from 1978 also introduced singer Randi Hansen, after which she had her own music career. The albums In From The Cold (1979) and Myrland (1980) were collaborations with Jonas Fjeld and his band. In 1982 he issued the album Ækte, and Fann æ was issued in 1983. In 1997 he issued the compilation album Vante folk.

Myrland resided in Bodø for many years. He died on 24 April 2021, 73 years old.
