= Sven G. Eliassen =

Norwegian historian (born 1944)

Sven Gøran Eliassen (born 1944) is a Norwegian historian.

He was born in Gothenburg, and took the cand.philol. degree at the University of Oslo in 1973 with the paper Hafslund hovedgård og sagbruk. Oversikt over Hafslunds historie i tiden ca. 1600-1786. He was hired at Borgarsyssel Museum in 1972, and became the director of that museum in 1984. He specializes in the history of Østfold, and publications include Tune 1537-1800 (1978), Rolvsøy 1500-1994 (1994), Herregårder i Østfold (1997) and Halden: Byen, landskapet og menneskene (2000). He contributed to the work Østfolds historie, writing volume three, Små len—ett amt (released 2004). He also co-wrote volume two, I Borgarsysle (released 2005), with Per G. Norseng.

He resides in Halden.
