= Gjerpen Church =

Church in Telemark, Norway

- Gjerpen kirke
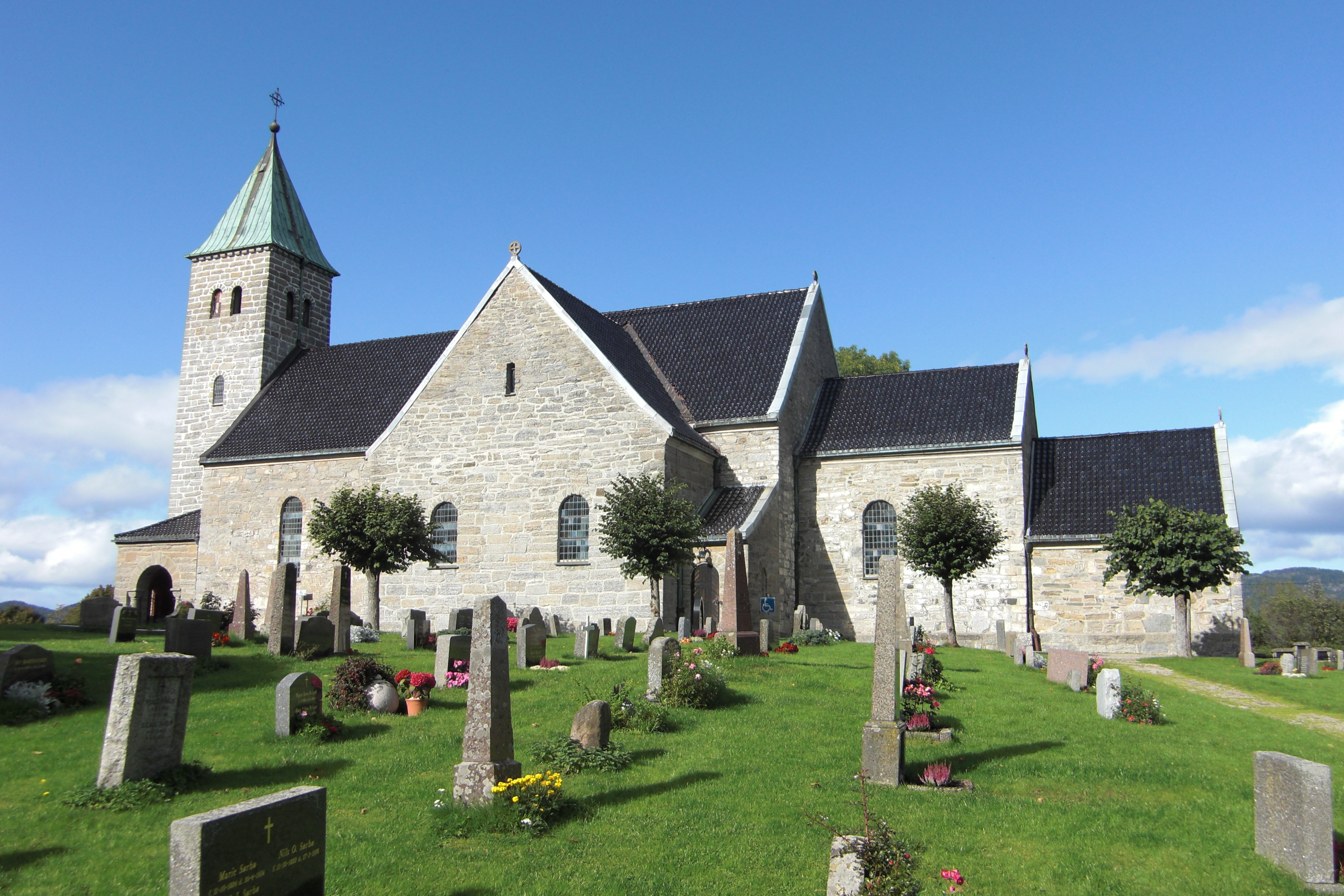
- View of the church
- Gjerpen Church
- 59°13′27″N 9°36′28″E
- Location: Skien Municipality, Telemark
- Country: Norway
- Denomination: Church of Norway
- Previous denomination: Catholic Church
- Churchmanship: Evangelical Lutheran

History
- Status: Parish church
- Founded: 11th century
- Consecrated: 28 May 1153

Architecture
- Functional status: Active
- Architectural type: Cruciform
- Style: Romanesque
- Completed: c. 1153 (873 years ago)

Specifications
- Capacity: 485
- Materials: Stone

Administration
- Diocese: Agder og Telemark
- Deanery: Skien prosti
- Parish: Gjerpen
- Norwegian Cultural Heritage Site
- Type: Church
- Status: Automatically protected
- ID: 84252

Gjerpen Church (Norwegian: Gjerpen kirke) is a parish church of the Church of Norway in Skien Municipality in Telemark county, Norway. It is located in the town of Skien. It is one of the churches for the Gjerpen parish which is part of the Skien prosti (deanery) in the Diocese of Agder og Telemark. The tan, stone church was built in a cruciform design around the year 1153 using plans drawn up by an unknown architect. The church seats about 485 people.

The church is still used for regular worship services as well as weddings, baptisms, and other religious events. It has seating for about 450 and room for 600 people. It is one of the few remaining building in Norway dating from the Middle Ages that are still in use. The church has a more modern chapel that is used in combination for ceremonies. The graveyard is still in use and maintained to this day.

The church is one of the oldest existing churches in Norway; it is believed the church was consecrated 28 May 1153 and dedicated to the apostles Saint Peter and Saint Paul. The 850th anniversary was celebrated in 2003.

== Location ==
Gjerpen Church is located on the northeast edge of the town of Skien in Skien Municipality in Telemark county in an area that was historically called Gjerpen. The Norwegian County Road 32 passes the church on its way towards Siljan. The area is moderately populated. Gjerpen Church has been located here for over 1000 years. The present church is believed to have replaced an older wooden church in the same location built in the 11th century.

== History ==
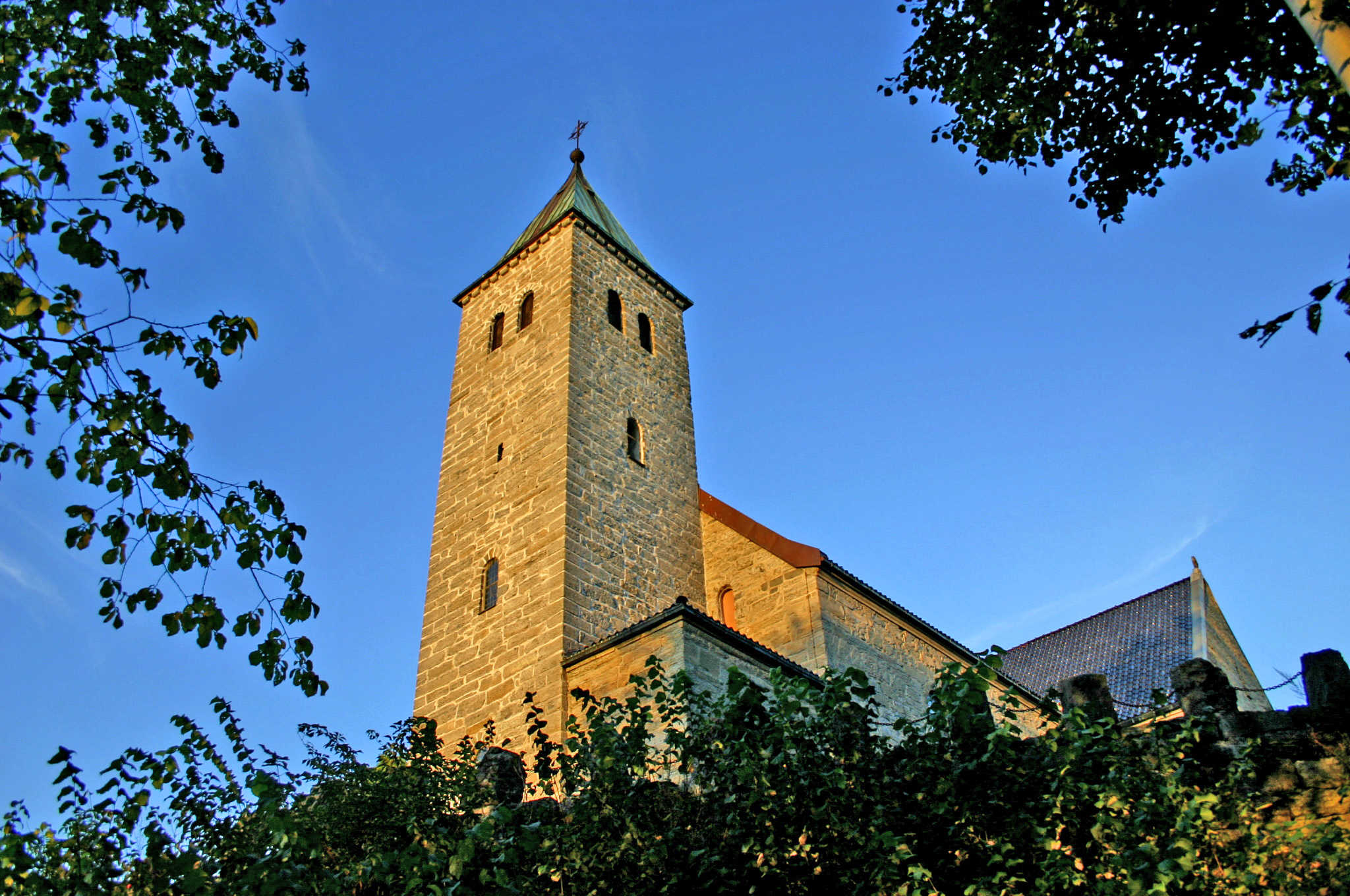
Gjerpen Kirke

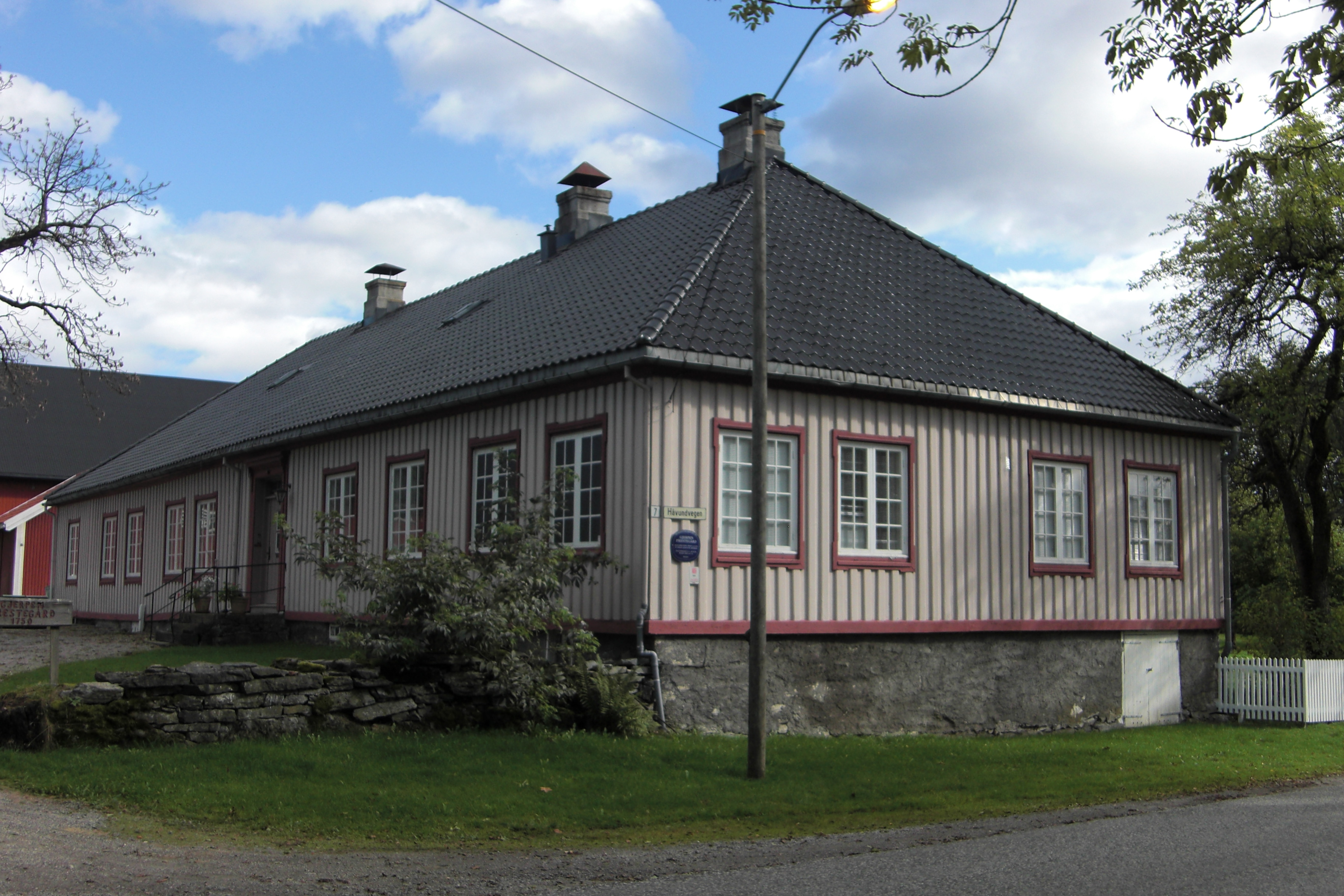
Gjerpen parsonage

The earliest existing historical records of the church date back to the year 1398, but the church was not built that year. The first church in Gjerpen was a wooden post church that was built during the 11th century. Not much is known about this building. Around the year 1150, the old church was torn down and replaced with a new stone church on the same site. The church was consecrated on the 28th of May probably in 1153 or around that time. The building was originally a Romanesque-style long church built out of stone. It was built with a rectangular nave and a rectangular, narrower chancel with an internal apse. In 1781, the nave was extended westwards by 10 metres (33 ft) and it received a new entrance and bell tower.

In 1814, this church served as an election church (Norwegian: valgkirke). Together with more than 300 other parish churches across Norway, it was a polling station for elections to the 1814 Norwegian Constituent Assembly which wrote the Constitution of Norway. This was Norway's first national elections. Each church parish was a constituency that elected people called "electors" who later met together in each county to elect the representatives for the assembly that was to meet at Eidsvoll Manor later that year.

In 1871–1873 the church building was enlarged again under the direction of the architect Christian Christie. During that project, it was converted into a cruciform design by adding two transepts to the north and south sides of the nave. A new, taller tower was also built at the same time. In 1919-1921, Harald Bødtker led another renovation and restoration of the building, with interiors designed by Emanuel Vigeland. Vigeland designed the new mosaic Den bortkomne sønns hjemkomst during this project. Additional features included glass paintings, pulpit, baptismal font, benches, lamps, and a bronze relief that was drawn in the 1920s. This was paid for by the Løvenskiold family, who owned the church for a number of years.

=== Modern history ===
In 2002 The Norwegian Directorate for Cultural Heritage Management (Riksantikvaren) reported that the church needs restoration because of moisture and mold damage to the structure, funding from the municipality was expected to fund this.

Gjerpen Church celebrated its 850th anniversary in 2003. On 13 November 2003, the church was set on fire in a case of arson and the interior was severely damaged including the loss of the church organ. The church was restored and rebuilt afterwards, reopening in 2004. The church was restored and reopened in 2004.

== Media gallery ==
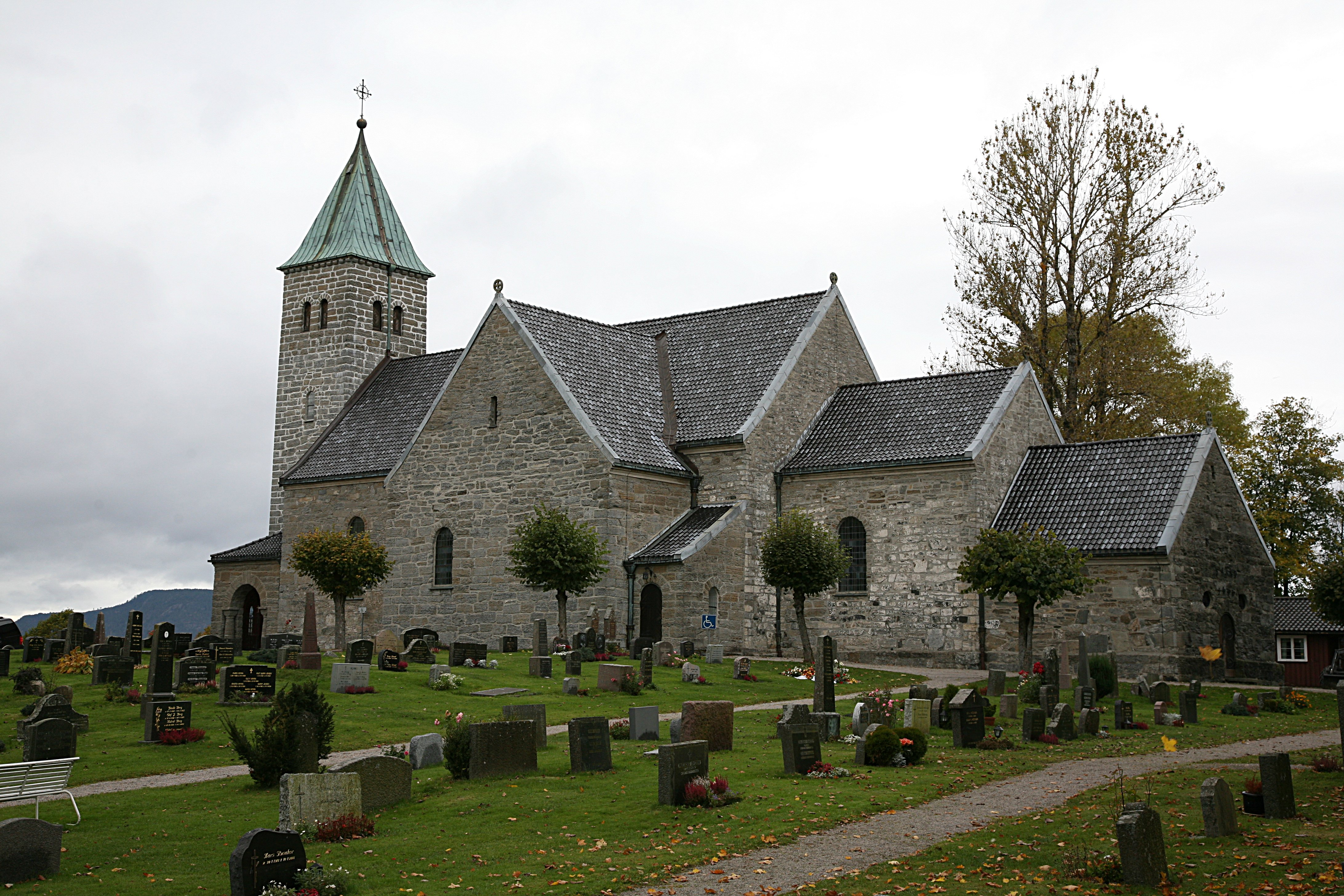
Side view of the exterior

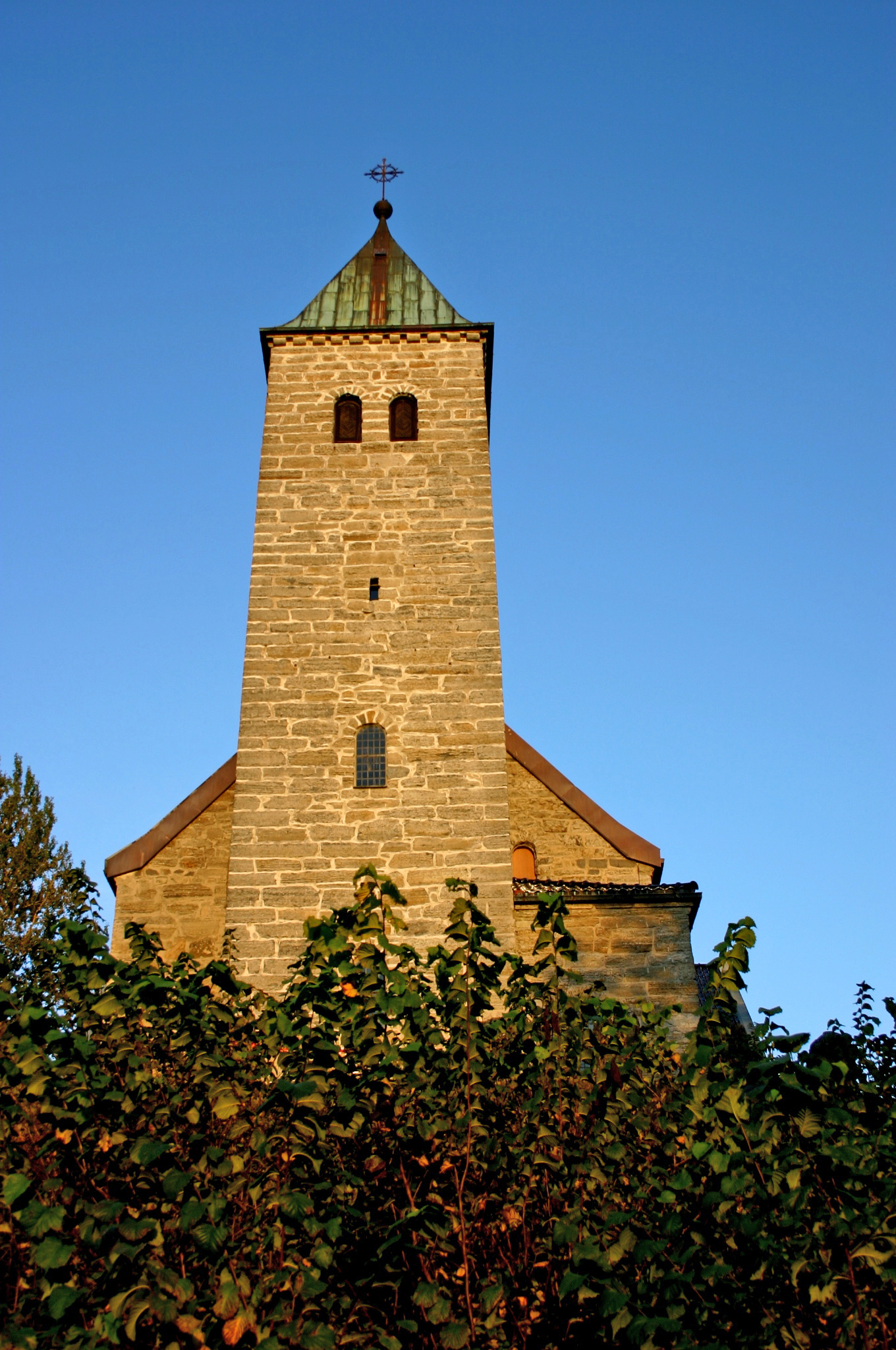
View of the front tower

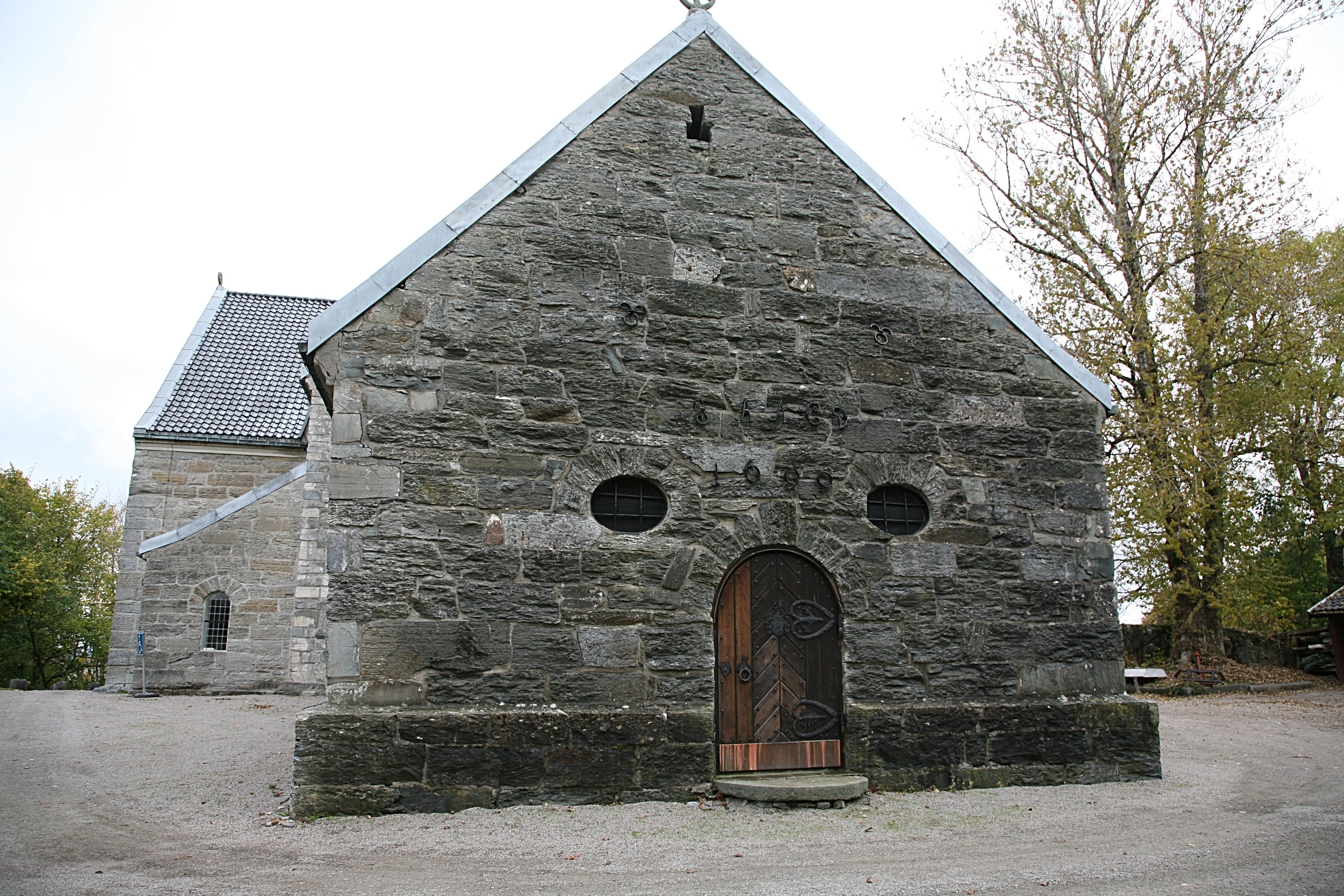
Backside entrance of Gjerpen church

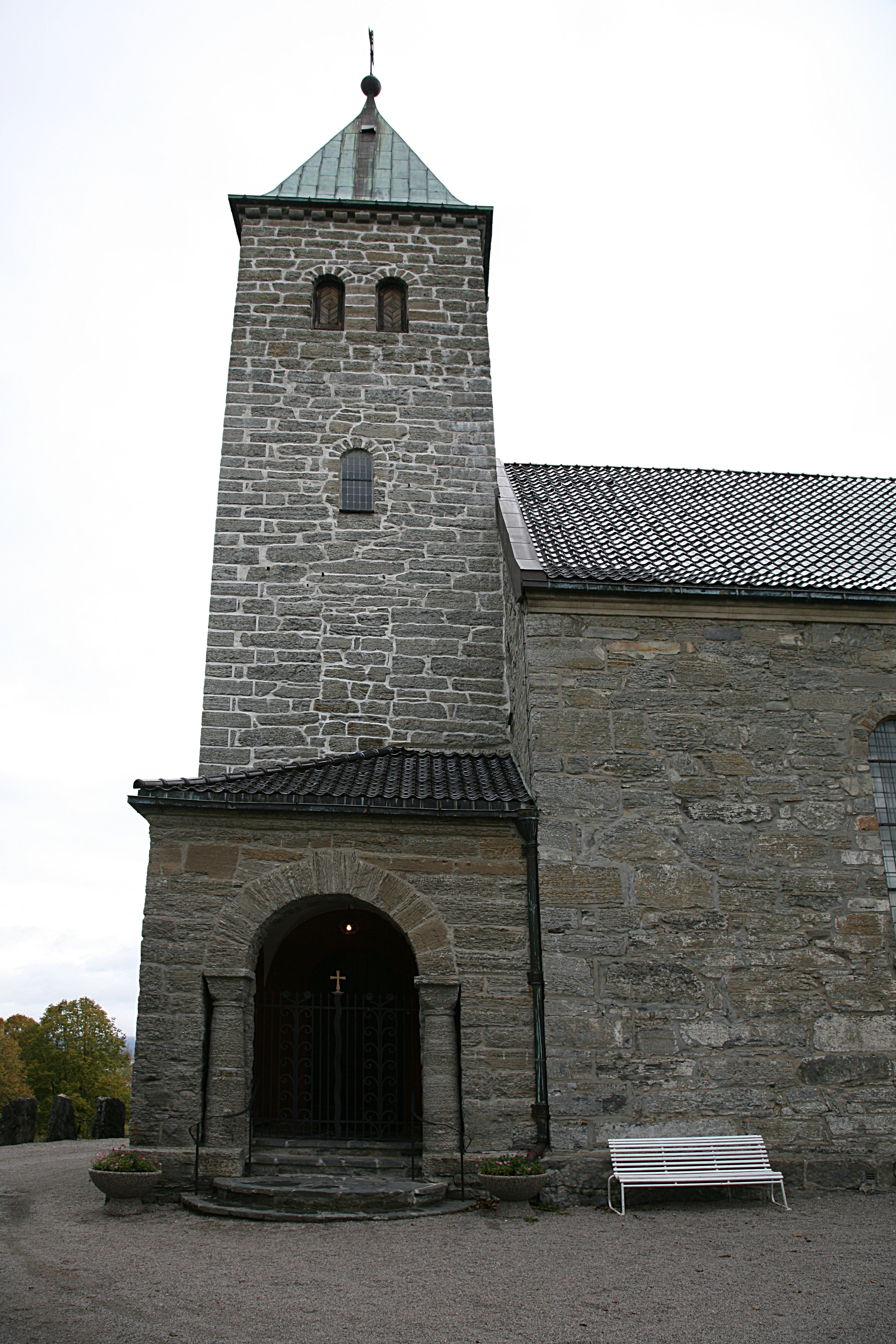
Tower of Gjerpen church

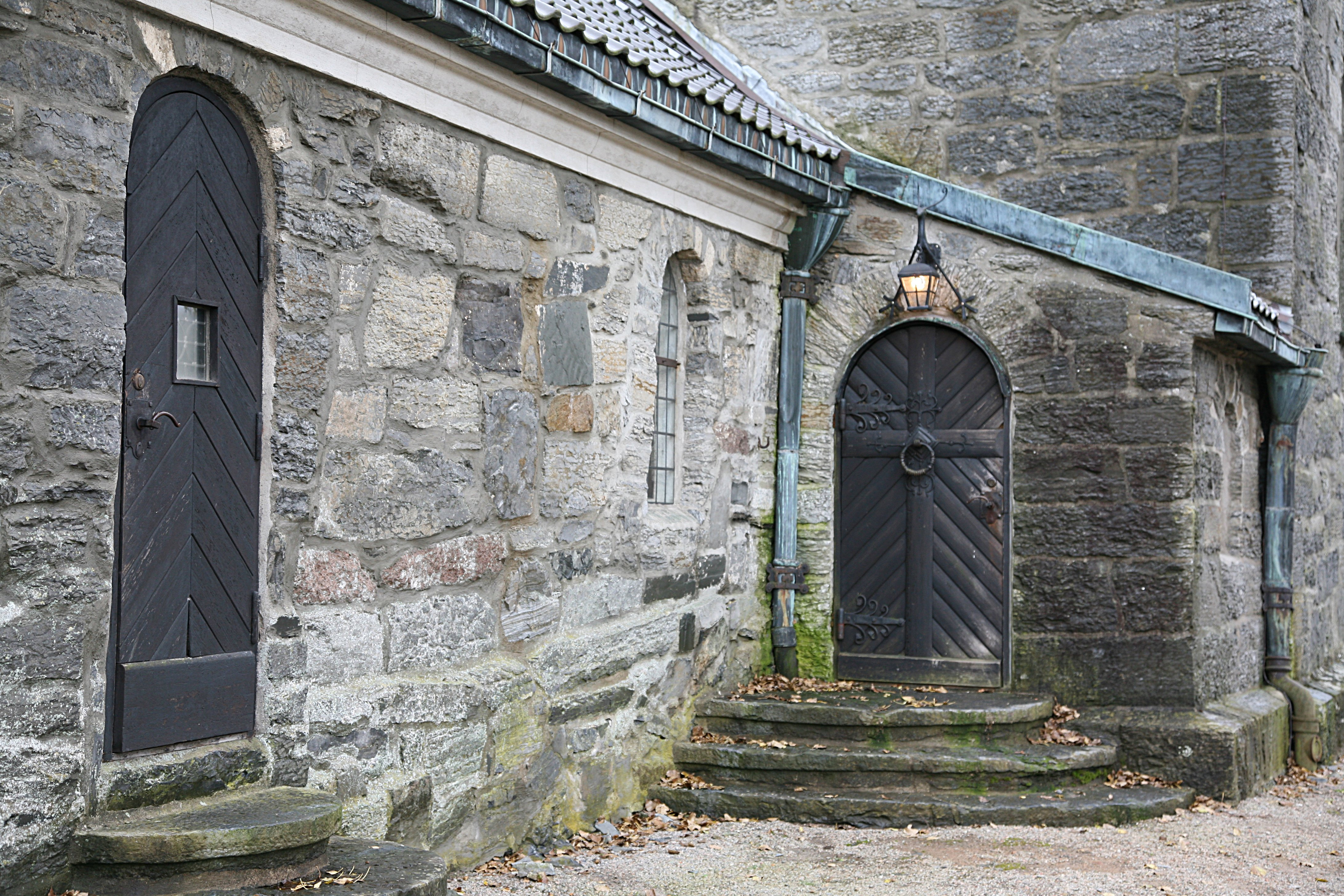
Side doors and details of Gjerpen church

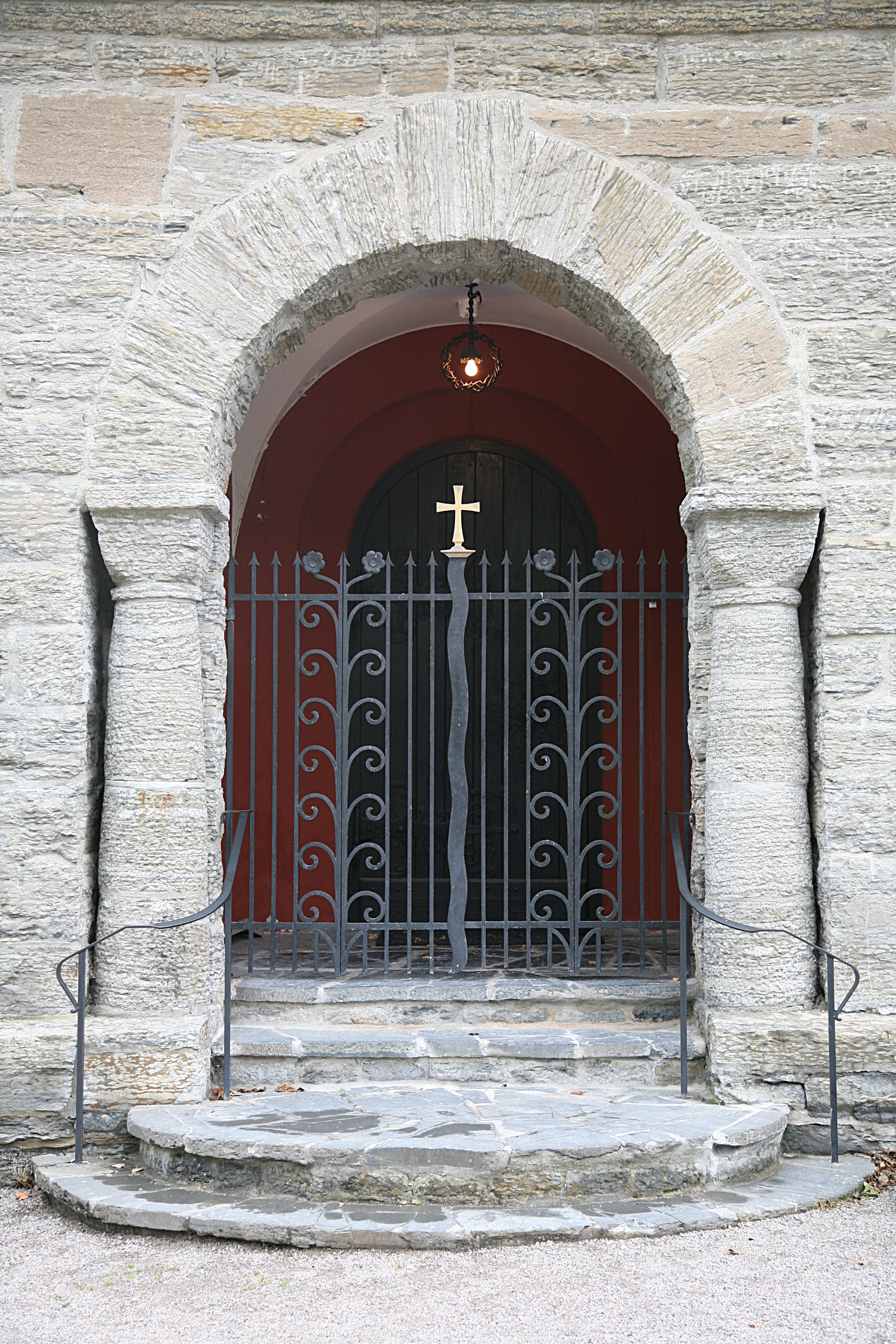
Entrance gate of Gjerpen church

== See also ==
- List of churches in Agder og Telemark
