= Jan Eivind Myhre =

Norwegian historian (born 1947)

Jan Eivind Myhre (born 26 April 1947) is a Norwegian historian.

He was a professor II at the University of Tromsø from 1991 to 2001, became a professor at the Norwegian University of Science and Technology in 1994 and then at the University of Oslo in 1996.

He is a member of the Norwegian Academy of Science and Letters.

== Selected bibliography ==
- Sagene - en arbeiderforstad befolkes 1801-1875, 1978
- Mennesker i Kristiania. Sosialhistorisk søkelys på 1800-tallet, 1979 (co-ed.)
- Bærum 1840-1980, 1982
- Hovedstaden Christiania: 1814-1900, 1990 (volume 3 of Oslo bys historie)
- Barndom i storbyen. Oppvekst i Oslo i velferdsstatens epoke, 1994
- Oslo - spenningenes by. Oslohistorie, 1995, with Knut Kjeldstadli
- Making a Historical Culture. Historiography in Norway, 1995 (co-ed.)
- Nord-Norges modernisering, 1995 (ed.)
- Historikerne som historie, 1996 (co-ed.)
- Valg og vitenskap, 1997 (co-ed.)
- Nordic Historiography in the 20th Century, 2000 (co-ed.).
- I nasjonalstatens tid 1814-1940, 2003 (volume 2 of Norsk innvandringshistorie)
- The Scandinavian Middle Classes 1840-1940, 2004 (co-ed.).
