= Sverre Kjeldstadli =

Norwegian historian (1916–1961)

Sverre Arnljot Breste Kjeldstadli (14 February 1916 – 28 March 1961) was a Norwegian historian.

During World War II he was a courier for Milorg. His PhD thesis from 1959, "Hjemmestyrkene. Hovedtrekk av den militære motstanden under okkupasjonen" (English: The home forces; Main features of the military resistance during the occupation), has been an inspiration for later works by other historians.

He was a son of trade unionist Lars Kjeldstadli (1870–1934) and his wife Beate (born Lotsberg; 1880–1965). He was a son-in-law of Daniel Grini, and together with Ellen Helvig Grini (1918–2001) he had the son, historian Knut Kjeldstadli.

Sverre Kjeldstadli died on 28 March 1961 and was buried in the borough of Ullern, Oslo.
