= Per G. Norseng =

Norwegian historian

Per Gudbrand Norseng (born 6 October 1951) is a Norwegian historian.

He was born in Oslo, and received the cand.philol. degree at the University of Oslo in 1983. He has been a research fellow at the University of Oslo (1989–1993), an associate professor at the Universities of Trondheim (1991) and Stavanger (2005–2006) and the Vestfold University College (1996–1997), senior research librarian at the University Library of Oslo (1993–1995), and a senior curator at the Follo Museum (1995–1999) and Berg-Kragerø Museum (2003–2007). He was then the chief curator (2007–2010) and the director of the Norwegian Maritime Museum (2010–2011). From 2011 to 2012 he was Head of the Department of Cultural Studies and Humanities, Telemark University College. From 2013 he is senior curator and head of research at the Norwegian Maritime Museum, and from 2014 also holds an adjunct position as professor of history at the Telemark University College, since 2018 the University of Southeastern Norway. From 1993 to 1996 Norseng chaired HIFO, the Norwegian Historical Association.

His most important publications include Byen under Eikaberg: fra byens oppkomst til 1536, co-written with Arnved Nedkvitne. It was published in 1991 as volume one of Oslo bys historie (History of Oslo) and revised in 2000 and released as Middelalderbyen ved Bjørvika: Oslo 1000–1536. He was also the project leader of the project Østfolds historie (History of Østfold county), Norseng co-wrote volume one and two; Øst for Folden (released 2003 with Ellen Anne Pedersen and Frans-Arne Stylegar) and I Borgarsysle (with Sven G. Eliassen, released 2005). Norseng has also published numerous academic and popular science papers and articles (see https://www.usn.no/om-usn/kontakt-oss/ansatte/per-g-norseng-article181970-6688.html).
