= Gunnar Sørbø =

Norwegian anthropologist

Gunnar Martin Sørbø (born 1948) is the former director of the Chr. Michelsen Institute (CMI). Sørbø’s professional profile and research interests include development planning and policy; conflict studies, peace building and conflict management; social impact assessment (incl. resettlement); agricultural and pastoral systems; regional analysis and economic adaptations.

== Work ==
Gunnar Sørbø was appointed as lecturer in anthropology at the University of Bergen in 1974, where he became chair of the Department of Social Anthropology (1978–80) and the first director of the university’s Centre for Development Studies (1986). During his time at the university, he taught social anthropology at all levels and i.a. chaired the committee recommending the introduction and establishment of English language Master courses at the University of Bergen. As part of his career, Sørbø has been a team leader for numerous policy-oriented reviews and evaluations, often with international participation and for a wide variety of clients. As a consultant, Sørbø e.g. led the first international evaluation of a ‘conflict NGO’ (International Alert, 1997) as well as the first evaluation of Norwegian peace facilitation (in Sri Lanka), 2011. He is a regular contributor to Norwegian newspapers on issues related to international development. Sørbø was CMI’s director for 16 years (1994-2010). In 2006, an evaluation team concluded that the institute had become of one of the leading development research centres in Europe.

== Boards and commissions ==
• The Norwegian Agency for International Development (Norad) – Prosjektutvalget (1984 – 1988) • The International Livestock Centre for Africa, Addis Ababa (1983–89) • The Norwegian Programme for Development, Research and Education - NUFU (1991-1994) • The North-South/Aid Commission - appointed by the Norwegian Government (1993-1995) • The International Food Policy Research Institute, Washington, D.C. (2005–11) • The Research Council of Norway (Division of Environment and Development (2001- 2005), Division of Society and Health (2011–15) • Cairns Institute (2010–12), James Cook University, Australia (advisory board) • J.W. Eide Foundation (1994-2010) • The Rafto Foundation for Human Rights (2001-7; chair 2012 -2016) • Faculty Board at the Norwegian University for Life Sciences (2013 -2016) • The Centre for Peace Studies, University of Tromsø (chair 2010-2016) • Norwegian Centre for Humanitarian Studies (chair 2015-2016) • Bergen International Literary Festival (2019-)

== Selected publications ==
• 2018. Norsk antropologi og utvikling (Norwegian Anthropology and Development). Norsk Antropologisk Tidsskrift, nr. 1-2, 10-25. • 2018. Livelihoods, Conflicts and Ethnicity: Reflections on the History and Relevance of Anthropological Research Cooperation. Forum for Development Studies, 45:1, 25-46, DOI: 10.1080/08039410.2017.1366361. • 2013. Sudan Divided: Continuing Conflict in a Contested State. New York: Palgrave MacMillan (with Abdel Ghaffar M. Ahmed). • 2011. Pawns of Peace. Evaluation of Norwegian Peace Efforts in Sri Lanka. Evaluation Report 5/2011. Oslo: Norad (with Jonathan Goodhand and Bart Klem). • 2010. Local Violence and International Intervention in Sudan. Review of African Political Economy, Vol. 37, Number 124, June 2010, pp. 173–186. • 2009. Pursuing Justice in Darfur. Nordic Journal for Human Rights, Vol.27, Nr.4: 2009, pp. 393–408. • 2009. Land Issues and Poverty Reduction: Requirements for Lasting Peace in Sudan and Afghanistan. In Joachim von Braun et al (eds.:) The Poorest and The Hungry: Assessments, Analyses, and Actions. Washington D.C.: IFPRI (with Arne Strand). • 2003. Pastoral Ecosystems and the Issue of Scale. Ambio, vol. 32, no. 2, pp. 113–117. • 2001. Aid and Academia: An Uneasy Relationship. Forum for Development Studies, vol.28, no. 2, pp. 309–327. • 1997. NGOs in Conflict – an Evaluation of International Alert (with J. Macrae and L. Wohlgemuth) – CMI Report 1997:6. • 1997. “Out of Conflict – From War to Peace in Africa”. Uppsala, The Nordic Africa Institute (with Peter Vale). • 1995. Norges utenrikspolitikk. Cappelen, Oslo (with T. Knudsen and S. Gjerdåker) (in Norwegian) – includes article on Norwegian aid policy. (2nd edition in 1997). • 1985. Tenants and Nomads in Eastern Sudan – A Study of Economic Adaptations in the New Halfa Scheme. Uppsala, The Nordic Africa Institute.
