= Edgeir Benum =

Norwegian historian (born 1939)

Edgeir Reidar Benum (13 October 1939 – 18 May 2024) was a Norwegian historian.

He was born in Verdal Municipality, and was a younger brother of athlete Pål Benum. He graduated from the University of Oslo with a cand.philol. degree in 1967, and worked as a scholarship holder there from 1968 to 1972. He then became a professor in history at the University of Tromsø from 1972 to 1980 and then at the University of Oslo from 1980 to 2009. He has twice been a visiting scholar at the University of California, Berkeley. He was a member of the Norwegian Academy of Science and Letters.

== Selected bibliography ==
This is a list of his most notable works:

- Maktsentra og opposisjon. Spaniasaken i Norge 1946-47, 1969.
- Sentraladministrasjonens historie. volume 2, 1979.
- Byråkratienes by. Fra 1948 til våre dager. volume 5 of Oslo bys historie, 1994.
- Overflod og fremtidsfrykt, volume 12 of Aschehougs norgeshistorie, 1998.
