= Knut Kjeldstadli =

Norwegian historian (1948–2025)

Knut Kjeldstadli (6 June 1948 – 4 November 2025) was a Norwegian historian.

== Life and career ==
Born in Oslo, Kjeldstadli completed his examen artium at Oslo Cathedral School in 1967 before studying English and social economics at the University of Oslo, where he completed his master in history in 1977. He took his doctorate in 1989 with the paper Jerntid. Fabrikksystem og arbeidere ved Christiania Spigerverk og Kværner Brug fra om lag 1890 til 1940. He became adjunct professor at the University of Bergen in 1992, and then professor at the University of Oslo in 1996. He was a member of the Norwegian Academy of Science and Letters. Kjeldstadli was also involved in politics, in the Socialist Left Party as well as ATTAC. Kjeldstadli was awarded the Brage Prize in 2003 for serving as editor of Norsk innvandringshistorie. He was also a recipient of the Sverre Steen Award in 2004. He was the son of historian Sverre Kjeldstadli, paternal grandson of trade unionist Lars Kjeldstadli (1870–1934), maternal grandson of editor Daniel Grini and grandnephew of politician Sigvart Grini.

Kjeldstadli died after a long illness on 4 November 2025, at the age of 77.

== Selected bibliography ==
- Det Norske Arbeiderpartiet: fra folkebevegelse til statsstøtte, 1973
- "Arbeider, bonde, våre hære..." – Arbeiderpartiet og bøndene 1930–1939, 1978
- Jerntid. Fabrikksystem og arbeidere ved Christiania Spigerverk og Kværner Brug fra om lag 1890 til 1940, 1989
- Den delte byen: 1900–1948, 1990 (volume 4 in Oslo bys historie)
- Fortida er ikke hva den engang var. En innføring i historiefaget, 1992
- Et splittet folk 1905–35, 1994 (volume 10 in Aschehougs Norgeshistorie)
- Oslo – spenningenes by- oslohistorie, 1995, with Jan Eivind Myhre
- Norsk innvandringshistorie (ed.), 2004
- Akademisk kapitalisme, 2010
