= Osvald Group =

Resistance organization in German-occupied Norway (1940–44)

- Leader: Asbjørn Sunde
- Dates active: 1940–1944
- Active regions: Norway
- Size: Around 150 saboteurs and helpers (1944)
- Wars: World War II

The Osvald Group was a Norwegian organisation that was the most active World War II resistance group in Norway from 1941 to the summer of 1944. Numbering more than 200 members, it committed at least 110 acts of sabotage against Nazi occupying forces and the collaborationist government of Vidkun Quisling. (Note: There were 39 sabotage actions according to Asbjørn Sunde; see Asbjørn Sunde: Menn i mørket. Dreyer Forlag. Oslo (1947), pp. 245–248.) The organisation is perhaps best known for conducting the first act of resistance against the German occupation of Norway, when on 2 February 1942, it detonated a bomb at Oslo East Station in protest against Quisling's inauguration as Minister-President.

The Osvald Group was originally the Norwegian branch of the "Organisation Against Fascism and in Support of the USSR", better known as the Wollweber League, an anti-fascist group founded in 1936 by German communist Ernst Wollweber, with the support and direction of the Soviet secret police, the NKVD. Norwegian communist Martin Rasmussen Hjelmen was its first leader, whose pseudonym Osvald became the group's namesake. Following Hjelmen's arrest in 1938 by Swedish authorities, Asbjørn Sunde, who used Osvald as a cover name, led the group through the end of the German occupation. The Osvald Group became independent in 1940 after the Wollweber League dissolved following Wollweber's arrest.

== Origin of name ==
Historian Lars Borgersrud says about the origins of the group's name, that "The Norwegian section of Wollweber's sabotage instrument was called 'the Osvald Group' («Osvald-gruppa») after the pseudonym of the leader, Martin Hjelmen"—Osvald. Osvald was also one of the pseudonyms used by Asbjørn Sunde.

== History ==
The occupation of Norway by Nazi Germany began on 9 April 1940 after Operation Weserübung. Conventional armed resistance to the German invasion ended on 10 June 1940.

After the 1940 arrest of Ernst Wollweber and the revelation of the Wollweber League, the Osvald Group was intact in Oslo but had lost contact with Moscow, and had no funding. The group stored explosives around the country. The group only initiated their sabotage activities after Operation Barbarossa, the German attack on the Soviet Union on 22 June 1941, and continued until the Osvald Group was demobilised in 1944 by orders from Moscow. The group undertook its first railway sabotage mission on 20 July 1941, the explosion of a Wehrmacht train at Nyland Station in Oslo. In July 1942 Sunde held his first sabotage course at Rukkedalen (where the group had their headquarters). "A short time later he actioned against German friendly" companies in Hadeland.

The Osvald group's active resistance policy was in opposition to the Communist Party of Norway (NKP), Milorg, and other organizations that preferred a more passive resistance. The group cooperated with the group 2A and 2A's police group, as well as with Milorg, SOE and XU.

In the winter of 1942, NKP formed military groups, and Sunde met with their leader Peder Furubotn. Sunde established a sabotage training center in Rukkedalen and recruited a network of saboteurs in the Torpo-Gol and Nesbyen area—and through Hallingdal and towards Oslo and Bergen. In September 1942, Sunde agreed to supply guards at the communist party's central camp in Hemsedal in exchange for practical and financial support. Sunde became NKP's military leader, and the organisation became more efficient.

In 1944 there was a break between the group and NKP's leader Peder Furubotn when Furubotn demanded that the group subordinate itself to his leadership.

The Osvald Group was closed down in 1944 following orders from Moscow. During its operative period from July 1941 to July 1944 the group was responsible for around 110 known actions, dominating sabotage activity in Norway during this period.

35 of the saboteurs were killed, excluding the one killed in Bergen.

=== Continued resistance by Saborg after the summer of 1944 ===
After the decommissioning of the Osvald Group, Saborg continued. ("Saborg was originally created and developed as the Bergen chapter of the international ship sabotage organization under Ernst Wollweber's leadership. This happened before World War Two".) In November and December 1944 the leaders of Saborg were arrested. Saborg was the only resistance organization, that at times was subordinate to Milorg in Bergen, SOE, or the Communist Party's section in Bergen. (The latter relationship lasted a few days until Saborg was destroyed, and it is regarded as insignificant, according to Borgersrud.)

=== Violent actions ===
- 2 February 1942 saw the first act of resistance against the German occupation of Norway when a bomb planted by the group exploded at Oslo East Station in protest against the inauguration of Minister-President Vidkun Quisling.
- On 21 August 1942, the Statspolitiet offices was attacked. (This was a result of Hans Eng not showing up on 20 August at a place where the group had prepared to assassinate him.)
- On 20 April 1943, it sabotaged an employment office on Pilestredet in Oslo. (This sabotage has been confused with a planned attack against the employment office in Heimdal Street, to be led by Kai Holst, and a 1944 attack at Pilestredet by Max Manus.)
- On 25 October 1944, a policeman in Stapo was assassinated in Bergen. (He was likely assassinated by Reidar Olsen, later arrested for that and a later assassination—and tortured to death by authorities.)
- On 9 November 1944, a bank (Laksevåg Sparebank) was robbed on behalf of the group.

The Saborg section of the Osvald Group was responsible for 30 actions.

== Organization ==
The number of members was over 200.

"The communist sabotage organization in Bergen" was called Saborg, and the core of the organization counted around 60–65 members.

The Vågård Group (Vågårdsgruppa) was another section of the Osvald Group. It was based North of Hønefoss, in the forest.

== Post-war ==
Saboteur Josef Monsrud said that "I am proud of having been part of the Osvald organization. And the recognition that we have not received, I can [accept or] live with. Because I know what we have done", according to a 2009 LO-Aktuelt article.

Sunde received an award (the Defence Medal 1940–1945 in bronze)—by certified mail—from the Norwegian government.

In 2013, then minister of defence honoured eight members—of the 17 who are still alive. Sunde and his organization received awards and recognition from the Soviet Union for their contributions during the war.

=== 2014 lawsuit over research project ===
In 2014 Lars Borgersrud filed a lawsuit against Museum Vest, and he demanded the return of documentation that he had gathered. Later that year the lawsuit was settled out of court.

=== Monument and plaquettes ===
On 30 May 1995 a plaquette was installed on a wall of an atrium that leads to Østbanehallen (from Jernbanetorget in Oslo), listing employees of the State Railways [of which at least two were "Osvald members"] who died during World War II. In 2015 the plaquette was moved onto the base of the monument at Jernbanetorget in Oslo. Other plaquettes are at other places in Norway.

On 29 April 2015 a monument was installed at Jernbanetorget, and unveiled on 1 May. The monument—["crush Nazism"] Knus nasismen by Bjørn Melbye Gulliksen—shows a hammer (specifically a mukkert) that is crushing a swastika, with the swastika nearly becoming "invisible (...) What we now see is a sledgehammer slamming at Norway's bedrock". On the base of the monument are two plaquettes and one inscription: an Asbjørn Sunde quote, "It was worth fighting for the freedom—for all nations, for all races, for all classes, for all people". (One plaquette is dedicated to dead Osvald members; another larger plaquette is for State Railway employees killed in World War II. Two of the names appear on both plaquettes.) Present at the unveiling were 4 surviving members. The permit (from the municipality) for the monument's current location, lasts for six months, whereupon placement of the monument will be reviewed. The controversy has lasted since 2014.

== Members ==
- Leif Kjemperud
- Rolf Andersen was an instructor and assassin for the group.
- Ragnar Sollie had organized sabotage of autos at the auto repair shop where he was a union steward and auto mechanic. In 1944 he led the Pelle group, a separate organization.
- Gunnar Knudsen
- Asvor Ottesen
- Harry Sønsterud
- Signe Raassum (1924—2022; nee Johansen)

=== Members of Saborg ===
- August Rathke, claimed chief of recruiting for Saborg (and [a] leader in the Communist Party's youth organization during a period of World War II)
- Alf Bjørkman
- Frank Nilsen
- Olaf Rutledal
- Martin Lundberg
- Leif Myrmel
- Martin Hjelmen was the Osvald Group's first leader.
- Norman Iversen was the leader of Saborg when it was unraveled and destroyed.
- Reidar Olsen
- Arvid Abrahamsen (member who helped hiding weapons and equipment; imprisoned in January 1945 and tortured; attendee at 2015 unveiling of monument.)

=== Other participants in the illegal work of the Osvald Group ===
- Oskar Johansen had a general store (landhandel) at Rugda, together with his wife Karen Helene. "[H]e participated in the illegal work of the Osvald Group" according to Halvor Hegtun.

== See also ==
- Leiv Kjemperud
- Ragnar "Pelle" Sollie
- Gunnar Knudsen
- Rolf Andersen
- Leif Myrmel
- Asvor Ottesen
- August Rathke
- List of military units named after people
