= Jostein Nerbøvik =

Norwegian historian

Jostein Nerbøvik (10 July 1938 – 18 March 2004) was a Norwegian historian.

He was born in Volda Municipality, and took his cand.philol. degree at the University of Oslo. He first worked at Telemark University College, then at Volda University College. He was appointed professor there in 1993, having taken the dr.philos. degree and the University of Trondheim with the thesis Bygdefolkets krisehjelp 1925–35. The opponents at the dispute were Tore Pryser and Hans Fredrik Dahl. Nerbøvik was also instrumental in establishing the Ivar Aasen Centre.

In 1973 Nerbøvik published his most well-known book; the general overview Norsk historie 1870–1905. It was later remade into Norsk historie 1860–1914. Eit bondesamfunn i oppbrot, published in 1999 as volume three of Samlagets norske historie, a series on Norwegian history spanning the years 800 to 2000. As the title indicates, Nerbøvik stressed the activity of the Norwegian rural populace in the democratization process in the second half of the nineteenth century.

He died in March 2004 at Rikshospitalet, having gone through a lengthy struggle with cancer.
