= Tore Pryser =

Norwegian historian (born 1945)

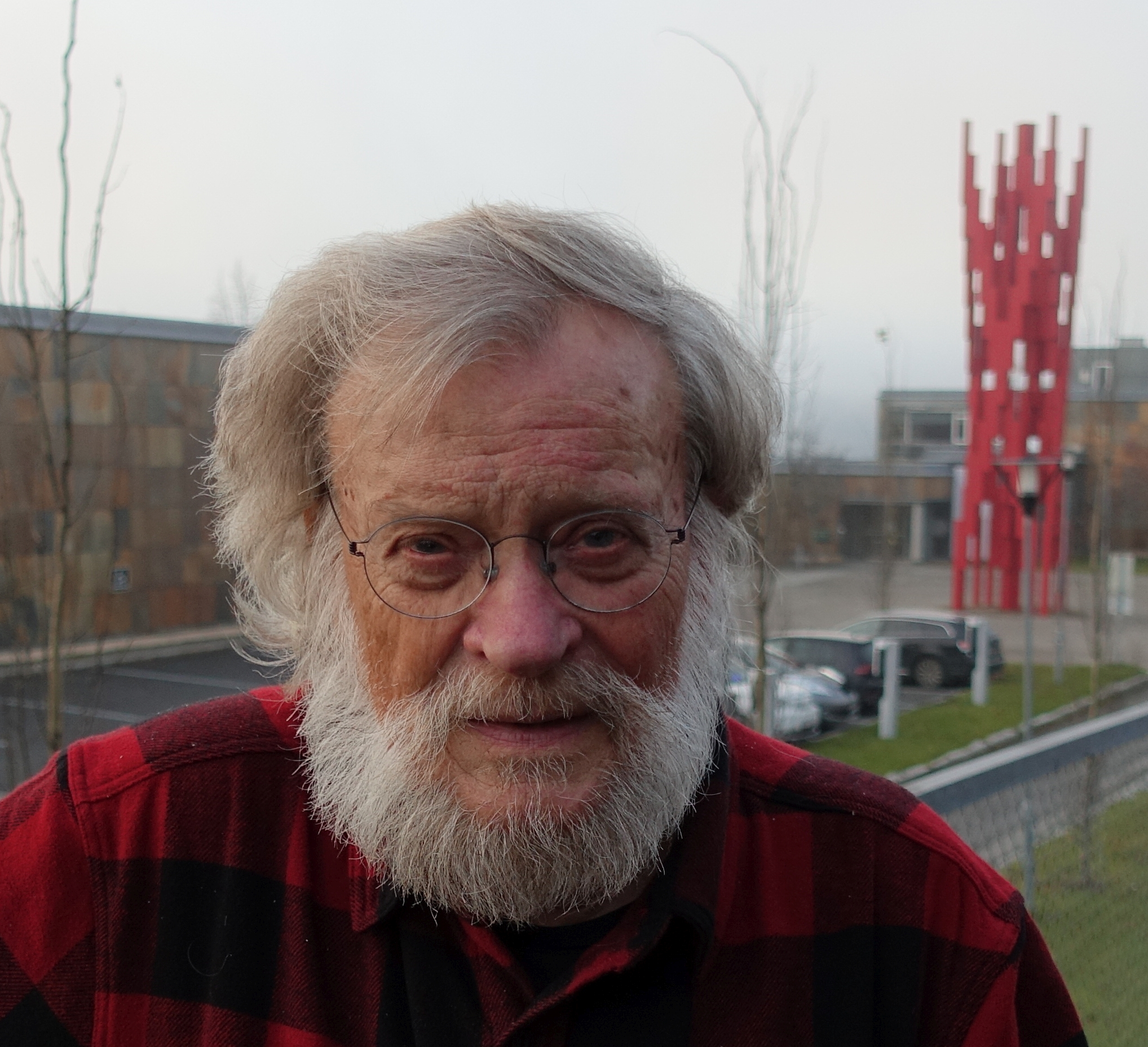
- Tore Pryser at the University of Inland Norway.
- Born: 9 January 1945 (age 81); Oslo
- Citizenship: Norwegian
- Scientific career
- Fields: social history labor history World War II history
- Workplaces: University of Inland Norway

Tore Pryser (born 9 January 1945) in Oslo, is a Norwegian historian. He is Professor Emeritus of History at the University of Innlandet and has worked primarily on social history, local history, contemporary history, the history of the labor movement, the interwar period and the Second World War.

In addition to several books on various subjects, Pryser has written Norsk historie 1800-1870 : frå standssamfunn mot klassesamfunn (Norwegian history 1800-1870: from class society to class society), a textbook intended for undergraduate history students. He also wrote Volume 4 of the History of the Labour Movement in Norway, entitled Klassen og nasjonen : (1935-1946) (The Class and the Nation: (1935-1946)).

An overarching theme for Pryser's research on the German occupation of Norway is "betrayal and grey areas". While much of the history of the occupation has been black and white, Pryser has highlighted that much of the history of the occupation period is characterised by grey areas. The usual thing was not heroes and villains, but that most people in Norway adapted. Instead of a national focus, Pryser believes it is more informative to view the period from an international perspective. Then one will see that Norway was largely a peaceful place, with very little physical resistance.

== Life and work ==
=== Education ===
Tore Pryser was interested in history from an early age, and began teaching the subject during his compulsory military service in Bodø in 1970, as a teaching assistant in the Royal Norwegian Air Force. There he also began researching his family history, and found that the family name came from an immigrant in the 19th century. Pryser graduated with a cand. philol. majoring in history from the University of Oslo in 1974. There he was a research assistant (vit.ass.) for then associate professor Sivert Langholm on the so-called Ullensaker project, formal name Norsk samfunnsutvikling 1860-1900 (Norwegian Social Development 1860-1900).

=== Teaching and research in history ===
Pryser was hired as a lecturer in contemporary history, a new degree program, at the then Hedmark/Oppland distriktshøgskole (Lillehammer University College) in Lillehammer in 1975, became associate professor in 1978, and was promoted to professor in 1993. Politically, Pryser was on the left and in his research and dissemination was particularly interested in history with a focus on ordinary people, often referred to as social history, and the great the great transformation, which he knew from the Ullensaker project. The connection between social history, political engagement and students' homework with the householder's life resulted in reports in the local newspaper Gudbrandsdølen Lillehammer Tilskuer and Billedbladet Nå, and it ended up being a topic in the Storting's question time. The result was that Pryser and his colleagues came out well on the issue, receiving the full support of the Minister of Church and Education Kjølv Egeland.

While working on local history in the area, he became aware that the preservation of archival material in the area was poor, and was involved in taking the initiative for what eventually became the Oppland Archive (today the Inland Archives). Tore Pryser and historian colleague Terje Halvorsen were the first two of the college's employees to achieve professorial competence based on research work at the then Oppland District College in 1993 (what is now the University of Innlandet), in Pryser's case as a professor of contemporary history.

=== Local history ===
Tore Pryser has been broadly interested in local history, both in research and dissemination. He has given lectures, published in local history yearbooks, but has also been involved in preserving physical memories. Since the late 1970s, Pryser has been involved in getting an updated municipal history for Lillehammer and Fåberg. Work did not begin until 1991, according to a plan Pryser had drawn up as head of Lillehammer's cultural board. The project was divided into three volumes, the first up to 1827, when Lillehammer became a city. The second volume covered the rest of the 19th century and the period up to 1914, while the third volume covered up to the 1990s. Although there were many challenges along the way, the authors, with support from Pryser and others on the editorial committee, managed to bring the project to a successful conclusion, and the three volumes were published as they were completed, the last in 2004.

As part of his research on social history, Pryser also investigated the Thrane Movement (the first Norwegian workers' movement, named after its leader, Marcus Thrane), both locally in Ullensaker and elsewhere in Eastern Norway. Pryser's research led to him receiving an invitation to give a lecture on the Thranites at a seminar at the University of London in the early 1990s. The seminar was fruitful, not least because British historians believed that support for the Thranite Movement in Norway was very high, seen from an international perspective.

In 2009, Pryser initiated a book project about 1814 in Oppland (a former county in Norway). The purpose was to bring forward knowledge about others than just the participants at the Norwegian Constituent Assembly at Eidsvoll in 1814. A total of 300 men; electors, and those who had signed declarations of support, were investigated to find sources about them that could be used in the book. In connection with the research and development of the book project, many people and institutions were involved in the process; the Regional State Archives in Hamar, the Mjøs Museum and the Gudbrandsdals Museums, the author Karsten Alnæs was also a supporter. From 2010, Tore Pryser gave several lectures about 1814, in 2014 alone there were over 40 lectures in various places in Oppland county. The research behind the book project showed the importance of kinship networks for the selection of electors, electors and signers of declarations of support for Christian Frederik. A concrete result of the project was the importance Hunn Gård had in the election of Eidsvollsmenn (members of the Norwegian Constituent Assembly at Eidsvoll), which led to funds for the restoration of the main building on the farm. The project also led to attempts to document the position of women in 1814.

=== Major historical works ===
Pryser was approached by the publishing house Det Norske Samlaget, who wanted a revision of Arne Bergsgård's Norsk historie 1814-1880 (Norwegian History 1814-1880), which was a syllabus for undergraduate history students. He declined, as he believed the book was outdated. In 1981, Pryser was then asked by the publisher if he could write a completely new book about the period, intended as a syllabus for undergraduate students. Pryser agreed, and the book was ready in 1985, with the title Norsk historie 1800-1870 : frå standssamfunn mot klassesamfunn (Norwegian History 1800-1870: from class society to class society). The book received good reviews from reviewers, both from Øystein Sørensen in Dagbladet and Åsmund Egge in Klassekampen. In total, the book has sold nearly 20,000 copies. In the field of Norwegian nineteenth- and twentieth-century history, his 1985 tome is influential. In 1999 it was republished in an abridged version, Norsk historie 1814–1860, Frå standssamfunn mot klassesamfunn, as volume four of Samlagets norske historie, a series on Norwegian history spanning the years 800 to 2000. As the title indicates, Pryser's book has a social perspective on the period.

In the same year, in 1981, Pryser also received a request from Professor Edvard Bull Jr. to write a volume in the work Arbeiderbevegelsens historie i Norge. Bull accepted that the assignment from Det Norske Samlaget had to be completed first. When he was ready to contribute to the work, he was assigned volume 4, which covered the period 1935 to 1948, which began with the accession of Johan Nygaardsvold's government. At an editorial meeting in March 1986, there was a discussion about the structure of Pryser's contribution, where historian Jakob Sverdrup was critical, especially of Pryser's main scheme, where the occupation was analyzed from the concepts of cooperation, adaptation and resistance. The book was published in 1988 as Klassen og nasjonen: (1935-1946), and received mostly good reviews.

=== Board work in RHF ===
Pryser was appointed by the Norwegian Cabinet in December 1984 as a member of the Council for Humanistic Research (RHF), affiliated with the Norwegian Research Council for Science and the Humanities (Norges almenvitenskapelige forskningsråd - NAVF) as a representative of the then district colleges. He was a council member of RHF for a total of six years, and it was a demanding position. In 1985, a total of 34 million kroner was distributed, and around 450 applications were processed. The literary scholar Atle Kittang was the chairman of the council, and Pryser was elected to the working committee and was given responsibility for handling the history applications, which gave him considerable influence. Pryser seems to have made a good effort for the district colleges in RHF, their percentage of applications for support was around 60, while the average overall was around 20.

Pryser considers the most important project he participated in on behalf of the RHF was the series Handelsflåten i krig (The Merchant Navy at War), a total of five volumes, and he participated in the first meeting of the steering group in January 1987. In the early years, Professor Knut Einar Eriksen was the leader, while Pryser took over from the end of May/beginning of June 1991. The others in the steering group were Professors Olav Riste and Leiv Mjeldheim, with Arne Mathisen from the Norwegian War Sailors' Association. The book project was part of a project to make visible the efforts of the seafarers and the merchant fleet, at the state-owned shipping company Nortraship. For the Allies during World War II, this was Norway's most important contribution to the victory over Germany. The work in the steering group was demanding and there were many meetings, several of the authors of the various volumes were also behind schedule with the delivery of material.

There was also internal conflict over the direction of the work. During a seminar at the Norwegian Maritime Museum in Oslo, Professor Arnljot Strømme Svendsen strongly criticized the title of the first volume, Nortraship : profitt og patriotisme, (Nortraship: profit and patriotism) as they saw profit as a derogatory term. The central union, the Norwegian Seafarers' Union, refused the historians from the project access to its archives, stating that "we do not trust the historians". It later emerged that the NSF had burned archive material, and there was speculation that the union wanted to hide its involvement in blacklisting seamen who were communists. In 1991, the first volume, Nortraship : profitt og patriotisme, by Atle Thowsen, was launched at a press conference at the Hotel Continental, where Pryser thanked Minister of Trade Bjørn Tore Godal, as chairman of the steering group. The following four volumes followed in the following years, and Guri Hjeltnes delivered the last, Krigsseiler : krig, hjemkomst, oppgjør, in 1997. It was received by Minister of Defence Jørgen Kosmo on behalf of the government, and the HIK project was completed after ten years of work. The five-volume work received generally good reviews, both from professional historians and journalists.

=== The Lillehammer Coup and Kai Holst ===
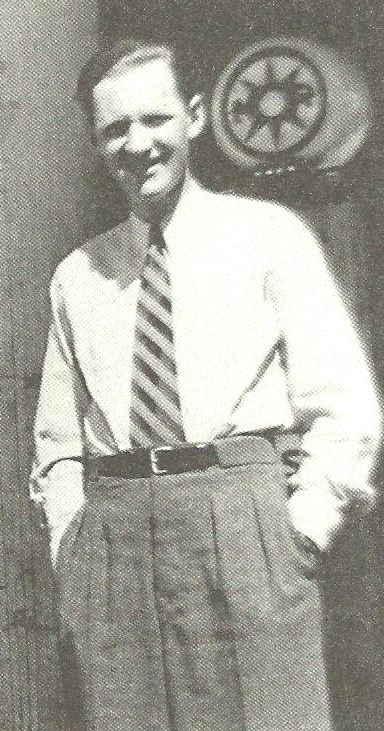
Kai Holst, photo taken a few days before he was found dead in Stockholm, June 1945

In the 1980s, Pryser became aware that German signals intelligence agents had been picked up by Swedish intelligence in the May days of 1945 from the German Wehrmacht headquarters for Norway and the northern areas at Lillehammer and transported to Sweden. From there, a few weeks later, they were sent to the American occupation zone in Germany. This has later become known as the Lillehammer Coup, and was a collaboration between the Swedish intelligence agency C-byrån and the US Office of Strategic Services (OSS), referred to by the Americans as Operation Claw.

In this connection, Pryser looked into the fate of Kai Holst, originally from Lillehammer. He was found dead in Stockholm in June 1945. The death is officially closed as a suicide, but Pryser believes Holst was murdered, and that his death can be linked to the Lillehammer coup. In 1994, Pryser wrote the book From Hot to Cold War: The Intelligence Coup in Lillehammer in the Days of Liberation 1945 and a Possible Murder about the case, which was updated and republished in an expanded edition in 2022. He has also mentioned Kai Holst in several of his other books.

In June 2025, Tore Pryser was interviewed in a major article in the magazine Aftenposten Historie, about the death that has interested and engaged him for over 30 years. The article stated that Pryser, together with author Göran Elgemyr, Holst's niece Kari Heyerdahl-Larsen Høgset and Ulf Larsen, are working to have a public investigation of the case.

=== Criticism of the prevailing version of war history ===
As a historian of Norway during World War II, Pryser has been critical of the previously prevailing version of Norway's war effort during the war and claimed, among other things, in 1998 that the framework for the historiography of the occupation has been narrow. In December 2008, he claimed in the newspaper Klassekampen that Norwegian war history is unvarnished, one-sidedly national and deliberately obfuscating. He elaborated by claiming that war history is written in black and white, and that it is either about blackening those who joined the National Socialists, or glorifying resistance fighters in Milorg (the military resistance in occupied Norway) and Norwegian Independent Company 1 (Kompani Linge). He has also stated that several companies went largely unpunished for their economic cooperation, so-called "economic high treason", with the German occupants.

He further stated that the background to such biases is that a certain environment took control of the dissemination of history after the war: "The history of the war was a part of nation-building." Pryser believes that there is a fundamental conflict in the view of the occupation period. On the one hand is what he calls the "Skodvin School" after Professor Magne Skodvin. These are historians associated with Norway's Resistance Museum and the Norwegian Institute for Defence Studies (Olav Riste). On the other hand are historians such as Svein Blindheim, Lars Borgersrud, Harald Berntsen and himself.

Pryser claimed in 2008 that Jens Christian Hauge was the central strategist among resistance fighters affiliated with the Labour Party, that Norway's Resistance Museum sprang from this environment, and that they still convey a one-sided view of history. "We hoped that it would develop into a more critical institution when professional historians [like Arnfinn Moland] gained control. But it is still the interpretation of the Milorg leadership that dominates." He further believes that the consequences of this are that many topics have been little explored.

Pryser has also dealt with the participation of Norwegian women during World War II and believes that their role has been forgotten. In 2007, he published the book Women in Secret Services, which deals with women who entered German service, Norwegian service, and women who were double agents. Pryser also contributed to the Norsk krigsleksikon 1940–1945, an encyclopedia published in 1995.

=== German intelligence in Norway ===
In 2001, he published the book Hitler's Secret Agents, which dealt with a number of Germans and Norwegians who worked for the military intelligence service Abwehr, Sicherheitspolizei (SIPO), including the Sicherheitsdienst (SD) and the Gestapo. The book was very well received, and has been mentioned as a reference work for later research. The book was considered groundbreaking as Norwegian occupation history had previously been reluctant to name Norwegians in German service. In 2012, this research was expanded to include German secret services throughout the Nordic region. He has also written about American secret services in the Nordic region during the war (in 2010) and British secret services in Sweden during the war (in 2025).

=== Betrayal and gray areas ===
He has formulated an overarching theme for Pryser's research and publication on the German occupation of Norway in the years 1940–1945 as "betrayal and gray areas", and the formulation also appears in the titles of six of his books. While much of the historical presentation of the occupation period has been black/white - the bad guys in Nasjonal Samling (NS) and the good guys in Milorg - Pryser has observed and highlighted that much of the history of the occupation period is characterized by gray areas. The usual thing was not heroes and villains, but that most people in Norway adapted to the German occupation rule. Pryser believes that the background for writing history in black/white lies in nation-building after the war. Instead of a narrow national focus on heroes and villains, Pryser believes that it provides more knowledge to see the period in an international perspective. Then, according to him, one will see that Norway was largely a peaceful place, with very little physical resistance. Norway was one of the best places for German soldiers to serve. The last book in what can be seen as a series is Cooperation, Adaptation and Resistance - More Betrayal and Gray Zones from 2023, where Pryser also attempts to summarize the impart project.

== Awards and distinctions ==
In 2008, Pryser was awarded the R&D Prize on the grounds that he is a prominent historical researcher in a national and international context, with a large and varied production. "In addition, Pryser has made significant efforts to build bridges between the research institution and the surrounding society".

In 2016, Tore Pryser was awarded the King's Medal of Merit.

== Bibliography ==
- Britiske hemmelige tjenester i Sverige - SOE og SIS-operasjoner 1940- 1945, Svein Sandnes Bokforlag, 2025 ISBN 9788293903895
- I min tid - historiefaglige betraktninger, Svein Sandnes Bokforlag, 2024 ISBN 9788293903666
- Samarbeid, tilpasning og motstand - mer svik og gråsoner, Svein Sandnes Bokforlag, 2023 ISBN 9788293903291 (E-bok fra NB)
- Fra varm til kald krig : etterretningskuppet på Lillehammer i frigjøringsdagene 1945 og et mulig mord, Svein Sandnes Bokforlag, 2022 ISBN 9788293903017 (E-bok fra NB)
- Svik, gråsoner, overvåking og Stay Behind, Svein Sandnes Bokforlag, 2021 ISBN 9788292945810 (E-bok fra NB)
- Storspion, dobbeltagent eller svindler? : historien om Karl-Heinz Krämer og hans spionnettverk under andre verdenskrig, Orkana akademisk, 2020, ISBN 9788281043763 (E-bok fra NB)
- Frigjøringsdagene 1945 : brennpunkt Lillehammer, Svein Sandnes Bokforlag, 2020 ISBN 9788292945575 (E-bok fra NB)
- Jødeaksjonen - og nye gråsoner, Svein Sandnes Bokforlag, 2019 ISBN 9788292945476 (E-bok fra NB)
- Svik, gråsoner og heltemot, Svein Sandnes Bokforlag, 2018 ISBN 9788292945322 (E-bok fra NB)
- 1814 i Oppland : bønder, øvrighet og soldater, Pax forlag, Oslo, 2013 ISBN 9788253036663 (E-bok fra NB)
- Tyske hemmelige tjenester i Norden. Spionsaker og aktører 1930-1950, Universitetsforlaget, Oslo, 2012 ISBN 9788215020594 (E-bok fra NB)
- Varulven og andre agenthistorier : svik og gråsoner under 2. verdenskrig, Spartacus Forlag, Oslo, 2011 ISBN 978-82-430-0604-1 (E-bok fra NB)
- USAs hemmelige agenter : den amerikanske etteretningstjenesten OSS i Norden under andre verdenskrig, Universitetsforlaget, Oslo, 2010 ISBN 9788215015866 (E-bok fra NB)
- Svik og gråsoner : norske spioner under 2. verdenskrig, Spartacus, 2010 ISBN 9788243005075 (E-bok fra NB)
- Kvinne mellom frontene : mellom Hjemmefronten og Wehrmacht, 2007 Andresen & Butenschøn, ISBN 9788276942163 (E-bok fra NB)
- Kvinner i hemmelige tjenester : etterretning i Norden under den annen verdenskrig Cappelen Damm, 2008 ISBN 9788202283360 (E-bok fra NB)
- Bokanmeldelse av Norsk innvandringshistorie, bind 2. av Einar Niemi, Jan Eivind Myhre og Knut Kjeldstadli: Innvandring og innvandrere til Norge 1814–1940 Historisk tidsskrift 2006 85: 129
- Mobilitet og mentalitet, Thorsrud, Lillehammer 2004 ISBN 8278471045 (E-bok fra NB)
- OSS i Skandinavia og Westfield Mission, Høgskolen i Lillehammer, Lillehammer, 2002 ISSN 0806-8348 (E-bok fra NB)
- Hitlers hemmelige agenter : tysk etterretning i Norge 1939-1945, Universitetsforlaget, 2001 ISBN 8215000754 (E-bok fra NB)
- Okkupasjonshistoriske sideblikk, Høgskolen i Lillehammer, Lillehammer 2000 ISSN 0806-8348 (E-bok fra NB)
- Bind 4 i Samlagets norske historie: Norsk historie 1814-1860, Frå standssamfunn mot klassesamfunn 1999 ISBN 9788252151848 (E-bok fra NB)
- Arbeiderbevegelsen og Nasjonal samling, Tiden forlag 1991 ISBN 8210033468 (E-bok fra NB)
- Arbeiderbevegelsen og Nasjonal samling : om venstrestrømninger i Quislings parti NS, Oppland distriktshøgskole 1990 (E-bok fra NB)
- Fra varm til kald krig : etterretningskuppet på Lillehammer i frigjøringsdagene 1945 og et mulig mord, Universitetsforlaget 1994 ISBN 8200219429 (E-bok fra NB)
- «Noen konsekvenser av fagpolitikken i 1980-åra» Historisk tidsskrift 1989 68: 463-478 (E-bok fra NB)
- Bind 4 i Arbeiderbevegelsens historie i Norge, Klassen og nasjonen : (1935-1946) 1988, Tiden, ISBN 8210027549 (E-bok fra NB)
- Fra kriseår til krigsår, Oppland distriktshøgskole 1988 (E-bok fra NB)
- Norsk historie 1800-1870 : frå standssamfunn mot klassesamfunn 1985, Samlaget, ISBN 8252123880 (E-bok fra NB)
- Gesellar, rebellar og svermarar : om "farlege folk" rundt 1850, Samlaget 1982 ISBN 8252122256 (E-bok fra NB)
- Internasjonale «revolusjonære» strømninger i Norge 1847-49. Noen forbindelser på individplanet Historisk tidsskrift 1981 60: 105-132 (E-bok fra NB)
- Klassebevegelse eller folkebevegelse? : en sosialhistorisk undersøkelse av thranittene i Ullensaker, Universitetsforlaget 1977 ISBN 8200016846 (E-bok fra NB)
- Lokalhistorisk litteratur med hovedvekt på Hedmark/Oppland, Lillehammer 1976 (E-bok fra NB)

== Print sources ==
- Tore Pryser, I min tid - historiefaglige betraktninger, Svein Sandnes Bokforlag, 2024 ISBN 9788293903666
- Tore Pryser, Svik og gråsoner : norske spioner under 2. verdenskrig, Spartacus, 2010 ISBN 9788243005075
- Tore Pryser, Hitlers hemmelige agenter : tysk etterretning i Norge 1939-1945, Universitetsforlaget, 2001 ISBN 8215000754
