= Operation Claw =

Post-World War II joint Swedish-American operation

Coordinates: 61°07′02″N 10°28′38″E

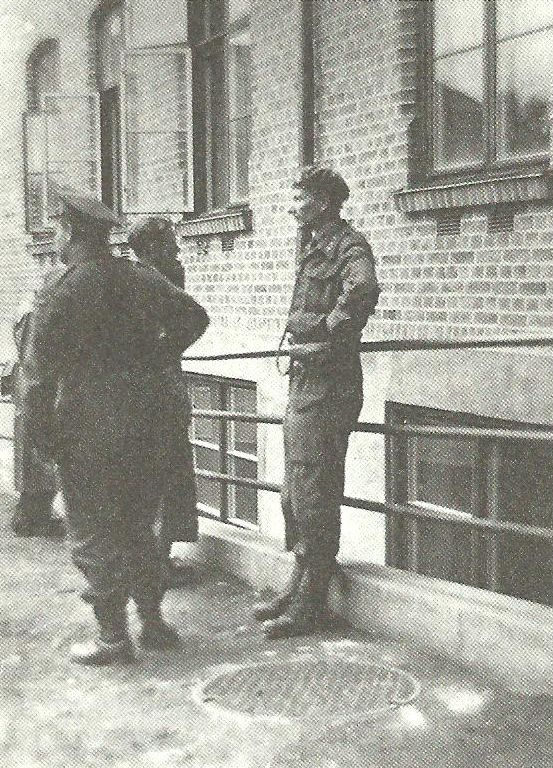
Norwegian Kristian Gleditsch (right) and British Major W. D. MacRoberts

Operation Claw (Norwegian: Lillehammer-kuppet) was a joint Swedish–American operation, with Norwegian support, that was carried out at Lillehammer shortly after the German capitulation by the end of World War II. Thirty-five German intelligence specialists were transferred along with various equipment first to Sweden and then to U.S. camps in occupied Germany through an agreement between the Americans and the German High Command of the Wehrmacht in Norway.

The intelligence material from Operation Claw, among it a Soviet codebook, became very useful for the Americans during the Cold War. Operation Claw was controversial both when it happened and afterwards. In 1945, it was controversial that the Americans operated in what was seen as a British controlled country, and that they secured information about its ally the Soviet Union, in cooperation with neutral Sweden. In later years, a hypothesis that the Norwegian resistance fighter Kai Holst's sudden death in June 1945 was related to his involvement in the Operation Claw has been put forward by among others the historian Tore Pryser.

== Background ==
Even before the war in Europe ended the various allied states had begun the search for German scientists and other German expertise. Signals intelligence had been vital during World War II and especially the British work with breaking the German codes, from the Enigma had been of huge importance. The Yalta Conference in February 1945 had revealed conflicts of interest between the western allied nations on one side and the Soviet Union and the relation was severely strained.

American intelligence organisations were very interested in German intelligence experts knowledge of the Soviet Union and immediately after the war in Europe ended they began to cooperate with the German Major General Reinhard Gehlen and his organisation Fremde Heere Ost (FHO) which had led German intelligence on the Eastern Front. It was part of an organized effort to obtain as much German intelligence information and personnel as possible; the operation had the name Target Intelligence Committee (TICOM).

The war was however still fought in East-Asia, the US and the Soviet Union were still allies and the Americans were counting on Soviet assistance in the war against Japan. The allies had designated Norway as part of the British sphere of influence. Both for the US and the neutral Sweden the operation was thus very sensitive and was conducted in great secrecy.

== Swedish–American cooperation ==
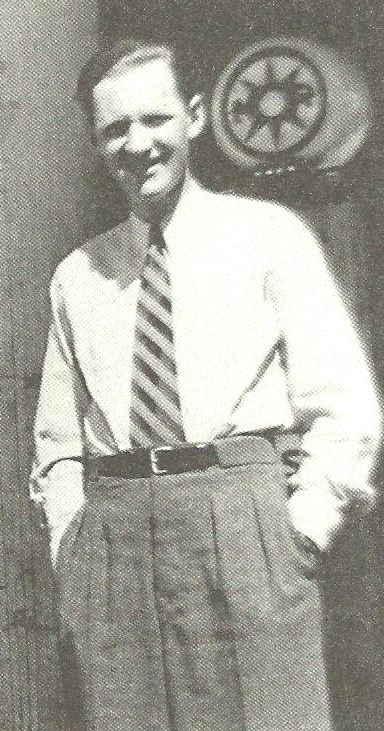
Kai Holst, assisting the British–Norwegian razzia at Lillehammer, was reported dead by suicide in Stockholm the day after.

In the Wehrmacht camp at Lillehammer a group of 35 German experts on signals intelligence were gathered. They had been working on the Eastern Front against Soviet forces and had an archive and extensive knowledge about Soviet affairs. This was knowledge the Western Allies, and especially the Americans, wanted and that probably also were of use during the Cold War.

In cooperation with the American intelligence organisation Office of Strategic Services (OSS) and with knowledge and support from the Norwegian legation in Stockholm agents for the Swedish intelligence organisation C-byrån traveled together with two Norwegian intelligence specialists to Lillehammer on May 9 and 10, 1945. The German group of experts were taken out of the camp and transported to Sweden. After a few weeks in Sweden they were on June 12 flown from Torslanda Airport close to Gothenburg to US occupied Germany and were interned in an American military camp at Wiesbaden.

The transfer to Sweden of the German experts at Lillehammer, that OSS called Operation Claw, was directed from the highest level. From the U.S. side the leader of OSS, Major General William J. Donovan was involved, from the Swedish side the chief of the Defense Staff, Major General Carl August Ehrensvärd. The famous Swedish police director Harry Söderman was also involved from the Swedish side.

== British–Norwegian raid of June 1945 ==
More than a month after the German capitulation, a British led search supported by Norwegian personnel was executed in order to find people from Gestapo and other German key personnel that tried to hide among ordinary soldiers in German military camps. The search force that Kai Holst and other Norwegians were assisting were soon aware of that a number of German key personnel had been removed in the Swedish–American operation a month earlier.

Kai Holst had been working at the military office number 4 (Mi4) at the Norwegian legation in Stockholm, and after the search he unexpectedly traveled right back to Stockholm. The next day he was found shot at the top of the staircase in an apartment building at Rindögatan 42 on Gärdet. The official cause of death was stated as suicide, but neither Holst's family nor many of his colleagues from the resistance movement have accepted this and are of the opinion that he was liquidated. The historian Tore Pryser has put forward the hypothesis that Holst brought with him information from Lillehammer that could damage Operation Claw and thus was killed. To be able to damage the operation Kai Holst can not have been trusted as others were. He must have been considered a threat due to his contact with Alexandra Kollontaj who was ambassador in Stockholm representing Soviet Union. A possible reason for a murder of Kai Holst was thus not his knowledge as such but his connections.

== Aftermath ==
Operation Claw was the beginning of the postwar era cooperation between Swedish and US intelligence services, in violation of Sweden's officially stated neutrality. From the American side the operation was viewed as a great success and the responsible within OSS, William T. Carlson and Joseph T. Kloman, were both honored with decorations where the operation specifically were mentioned. For the Swedish C-byrån Operation Claw quickly became toxic. Even though the operation was to be kept confidential, information leaked to the Swedish press and C-byrån were dissolved in February 1946.

Information regarding Operation Claw continued to be classified as confidential in the post-war years and some of it still remains so today. A report about the operation in the British National Archives is restricted until 2020.

== See also ==
- TICOM
- Operation Paperclip
