= Kai Holst =

Norwegian resistance member

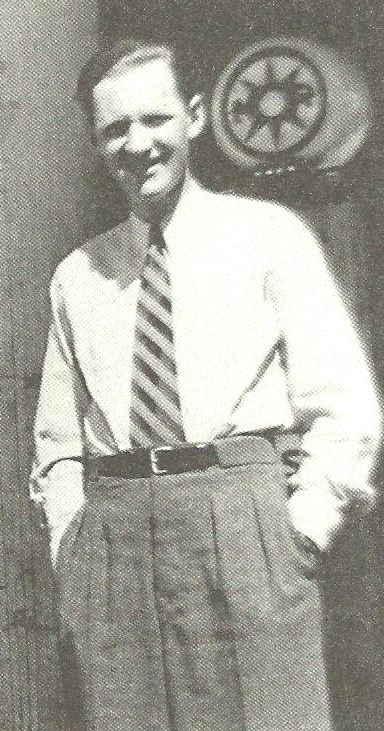
- Photo of Holst taken on 22 June 1945, a few days before his death
- Born: Kai Christian Middelthon Holst; 24 February 1913; Lillehammer
- Died: 27 June 1945 (aged 32); Stockholm
- Cause of death: Pistol bullet to head, officially suicide but many friends and colleagues suspected murder.
- Body discovered: Top of stairway, apartment house, Gärdet
- Resting place: Vestre Gravlund, Oslo
- Education: Secondary school, vocational school
- Occupations: Seaman, fur farmer
- Known for: Resistance fighter and suspicious circumstances regarding his death
- Spouse: Margarete Corneliussen
- Parent(s): Christian and Inga Holst (born Rasmussen)

Kai Christian Middelthon Holst (24 February 1913 – 27 June 1945) was a Norwegian seaman, fur farmer and resistance fighter during World War II. When the leadership of Milorg was torn up by the Gestapo in 1942, he acquired a leading role in the organisation and participated in re-establishing the central leadership (Sentralledelsen, SL) of Milorg together with Jens Christian Hauge. Holst had to flee Norway in the autumn of 1943 and stayed in Sweden until the liberation of Norway in 1945.

Holst is remembered both for his work with the Norwegian resistance and for the circumstances surrounding his death in Stockholm in 1945. Holst's demise was so much talked of at the time that the Milorg leadership issued a statement in the Norwegian newspaper Aftenposten in July 1945. Swedish and Norwegian authorities officially concluded that Holst committed suicide, but his family and many of his friends and colleagues were of the opinion that Holst was murdered.

== Background ==
Kai Holst was born and grew up in the town of Lillehammer. He was the son of businessman Christian Holst and Inga Holst, born Rasmussen, both originally from Stavanger. After elementary school Holst attended secondary school and vocational training in Lillehammer. A couple of years after his confirmation he found work as a seaman, and in the years 1930–1933 he sailed on MS Brageland, owned by the Norwegian shipping company Sydamerikalinjen, then transferred to MS Daghild, owned by the Norwegian shipowner Ditlev-Simonsen.

In 1933 he finished working as a seaman and became a fur farmer in Mesnali, east of Lillehammer. Holst contracted tuberculosis and just before the outbreak of World War II he had a major operation related to his pulmonary tuberculosis.

From December 1944 until his death he was married to Margarete Corneliussen, daughter of Ragnar Corneliussen, the president of Tiedemann's tobacco factory and a member of the board of Industriforbundet, and Monna Morgenstierne Roll. He was thus brother-in-law to Major General Ole Otto Paus, who was married to his wife's sister Else.

== Work with the resistance ==
=== Clandestine work in Norway ===
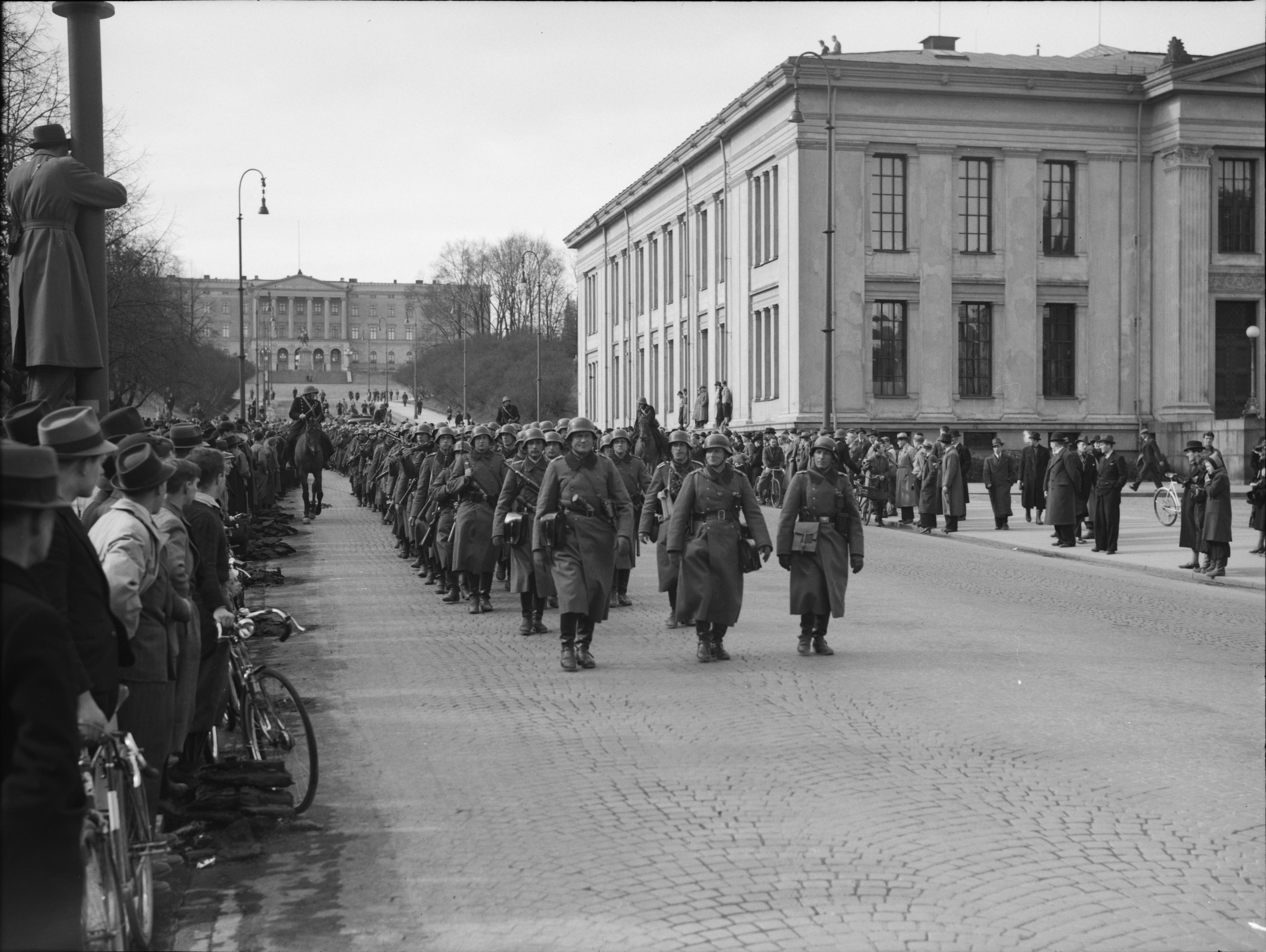
Norway invaded, German soldiers marching down the main street of Oslo in April 1940

After Norway was invaded and occupied by Nazi Germany Holst soon, despite his bad health, started working with the main Norwegian resistance organisation, Milorg. He was recruited in 1941 by his brother-in-law, the officer Lars Heyerdahl-Larsen and was soon given important tasks and gained a reputation as the most action-oriented man in the secretariat of the central leadership (Sentralledelsen). From 1942 Holst worked as a courier, established Milorg's system for hiding refugees (apartments where resistance fighters went into hiding before being "exported" to neutral Sweden) and had close contact with such central resistance figures as Ole Borge and Jens Christian Hauge. Kai Holst was, according to professor Tore Pryser, instrumental in teaching Hauge the various skills needed: "In many ways it was actually Holst who trained the inexperienced Hauge."

At this time Holst worked closely with Hauge and for half a year they shared an undercover apartment. Holst's girlfriend and wife-to-be cared for the two men and was herself deeply involved in work for the resistance. In his report about his work during the war Jens Christian Hauge was highly approving of "Kaka", as Holst was called informally, and especially recognised him among his colleagues. When Jomar Brun (known for his involvement in Norwegian heavy water production) and his wife had to flee to Sweden, it was Holst who through Milorg's chief of communications, Salve Staubo, organised an undercover apartment in Oslo for the couple. It was also Holst who through Staubo recruited Milorg's legendary chief of weapons, Bror With.

Even though he never had any formal executive position in Milorg, Kai Holst had an important role in the practical work in the organisation, and he was especially important for Milorg in the autumn of 1942 when several of the leaders were arrested by the Gestapo or had to flee to Sweden. Holst participated in the meeting at the turn of the year 1942 when Milorg was reorganised with Jens Christian Hauge as Inspector General (known as "big I").

In addition to being the link between the Milorg leadership and its district organisations, Holst was also the link to resistance groups independent of Milorg. They included Oslogjengen with Gunnar Sønsteby, XU, Asbjørn Bryhn' groups, 2A and the Osvald Group (also known as the Sunde Group after its leader Asbjørn Sunde). The cooperation with the communists and their inferior security almost resulted in Holst being caught by the Gestapo. Holst had an important role during the Osvald Group's fire-bombing of the work-service office in Pilestredet in Oslo on 20 March 1943, which Milorg hesitantly agreed to, whose aim was to destroy archives of people assigned to work service for the Nazi regime.

In spite of his bad health Holst worked hard and took on several dangerous assignments, among them meetings with people who were suspected of working with the German security services. Holst also organised squads for liquidating dangerous German and collaborationist Norwegian agents. Holst was a skilled undercover operator, fully aware of the risks of being captured, and always carried a gun and a poison pill with him so that if he was caught, he could commit suicide and not reveal information about the organisation.

=== Escape to Sweden ===
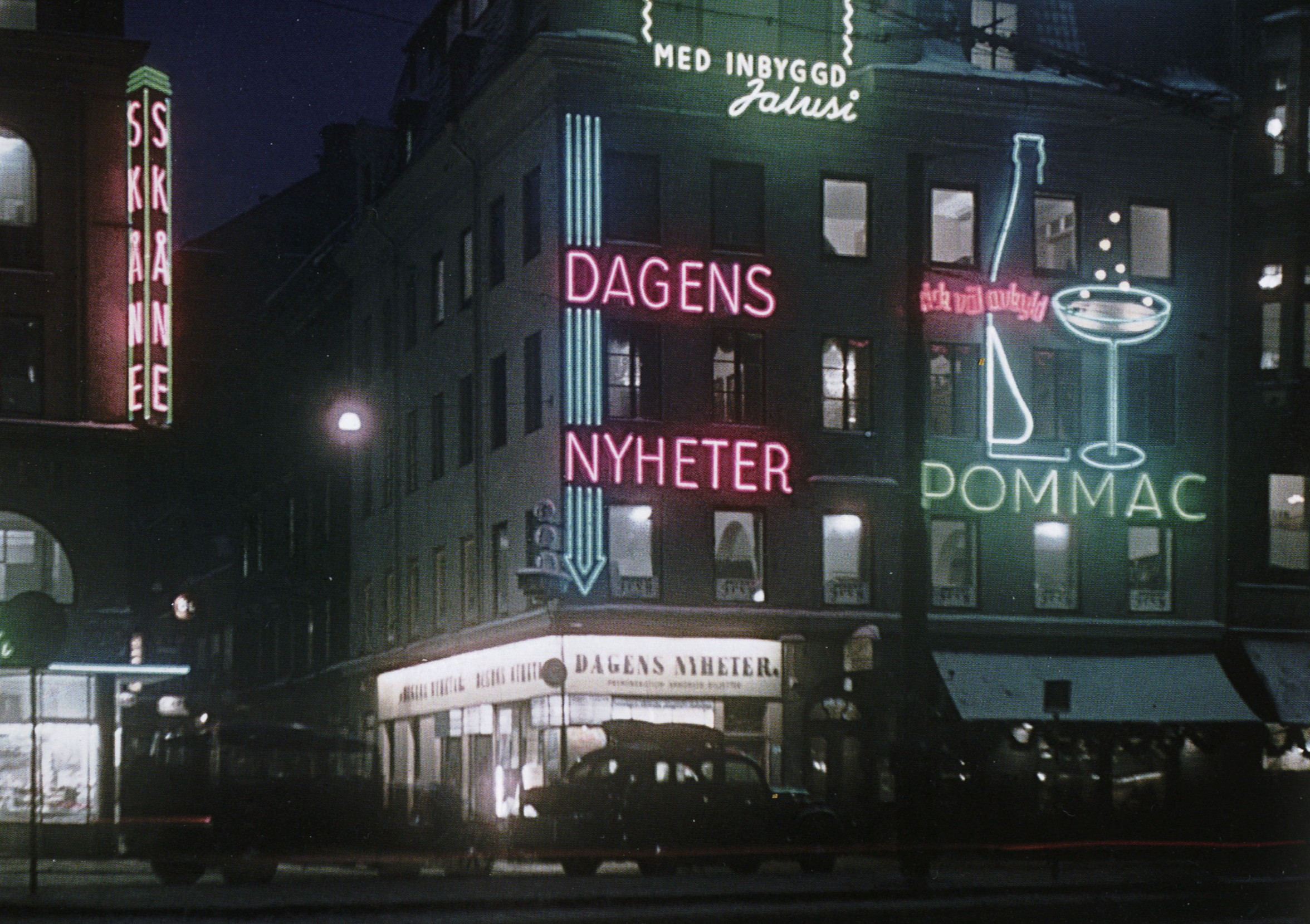
Stureplan in Stockholm in 1943

In the summer of 1943 Holst had to flee to neutral Sweden. After hiding at a fur-farm in Mesnali he was accompanied over the border by a border guide at Svinesund on 5 August. He was arrested on entering Sweden and explained that he had to flee as he had been in possession of a radio without permission, had listened to news from London, and had spread it to others. He did not say anything about his work with Milorg. After being questioned by the Swedish authorities in Strömstad, as a refugee from Norway he was sent to Kjesäter and after further questioning there given permission to travel to Stockholm.

In Stockholm Holst was employed at the Norwegian legation, working with military office number 4 (Mi4) at an office at Skeppargatan 32 on Östermalm. He worked with supplies to the resistance forces in Norway and one of his tasks was to organise courier activities into and out of Norway. Part of Holst's work for the Norwegian resistance was illegal in neutral Sweden. At least once Holst were arrested by the Swedish police, but was quickly set free. The arrest was connected with a failed attempt by Holst to organise a courier route over Magnor, assisted by a Swede with local connections and another Norwegian. After the war it was revealed that the two were in the service of the German intelligence agency, the Abwehr. Holst was good at organising and acquiring equipment and had many contacts, one of whom was the Soviet ambassador to Sweden, Alexandra Kollontai, from whom he acquired several pistols.

In November 1944 Holst was involved in an illegal weapons purchase and received a warning from the Swedish security police, Säpo. Around the same time Holst was mentioned by Säpo in connection with an espionage affair in which the Norwegian intelligence agent Finn Jacobsen was involved. It was however not possible for the Swedish authorities to interrogate Holst as he had diplomatic immunity. Finn Jacobsen was working for the British Secret Intelligence Service (SIS) and cooperated with Holst in supplying the British with intelligence from Norway, without the knowledge of the Norwegian legation in Stockholm, which the SIS did not fully trust. Holst was an activist and probably had sympathy with the action-connected resistance groups, such as 2A and the Osvald Group and the so-called sports office (Idrettskontoret) at the Norwegian legation, led by Harald Gram.

Holst married Margarete Corneliussen on 19 December 1944 in Stockholm.

== Peace and death ==
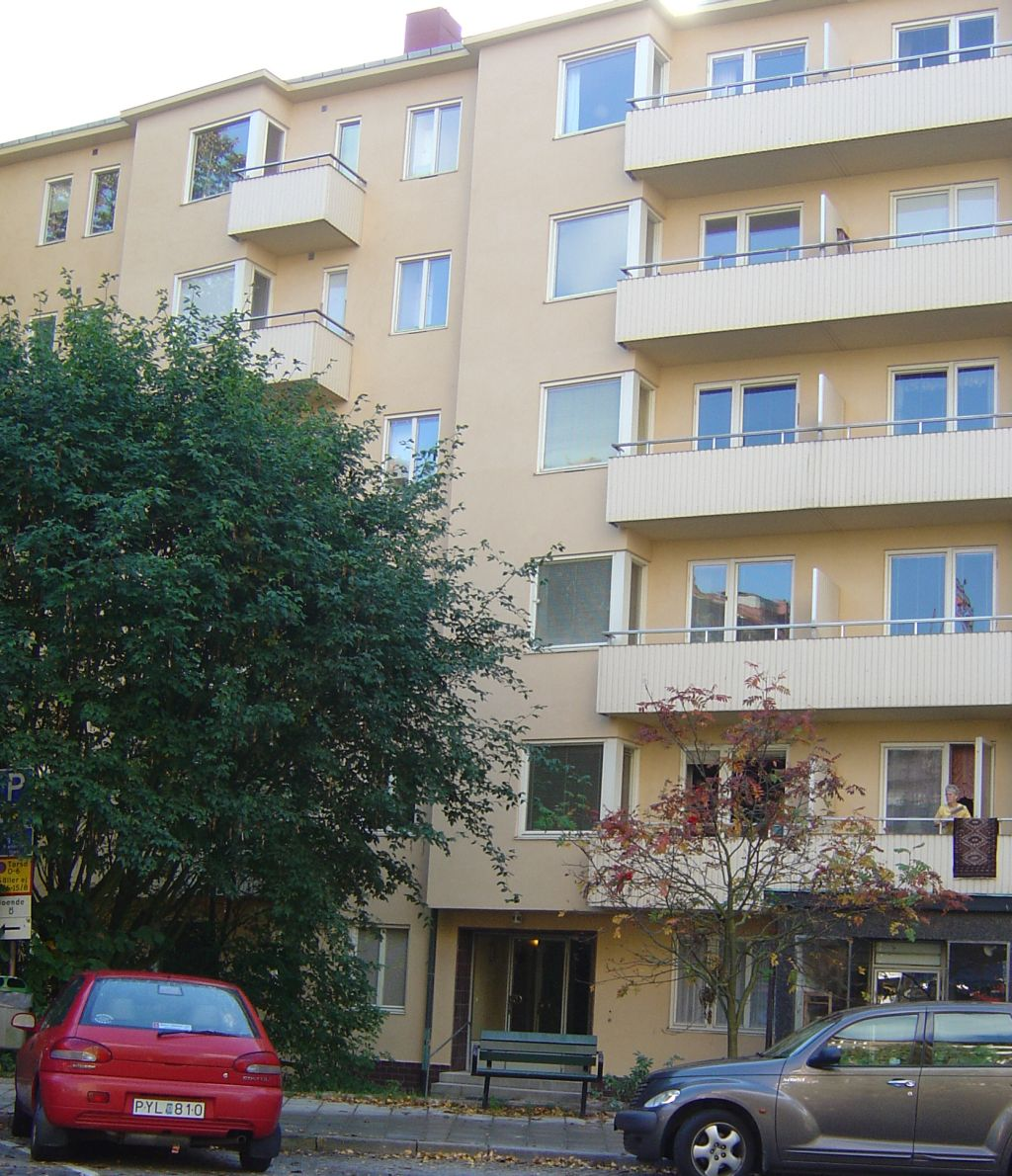
The apartment building in Stockholm where Kai Holst was found dead, Rindögatan 42 on Gärdet

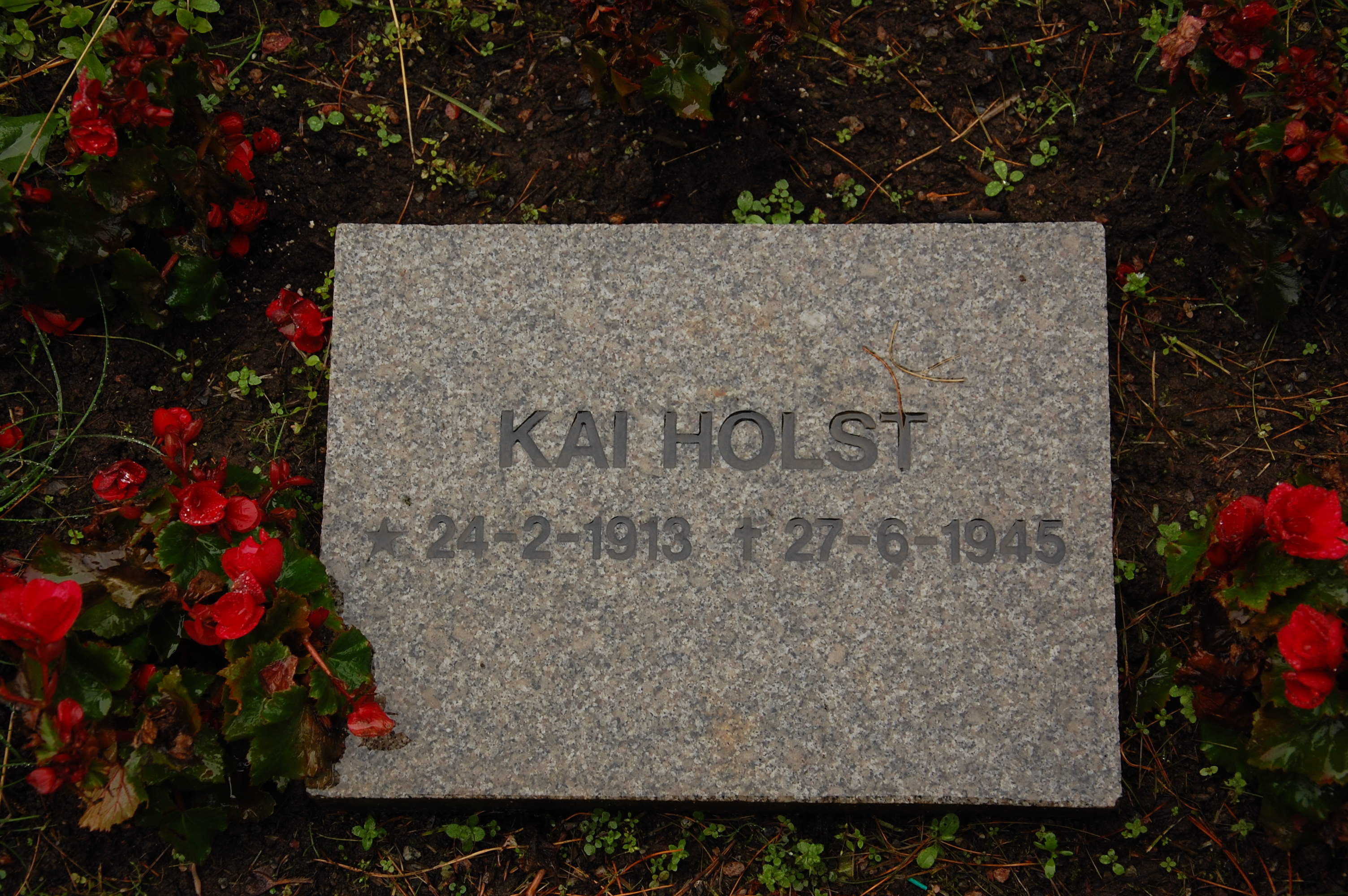
Kai Holst's grave in Vestre gravlund in Oslo

After the German capitulation in May 1945, Holst was working on closing the various storage bases that Norwegian resistance fighters had established on Swedish soil, and travelling back and forth between Sweden and Norway. On 23 June, he arrived in Norway by car from Stockholm and early in the morning of 26 June he accompanied British and Norwegian forces in searches carried out at German military camps at the Wehrmacht headquarters in Lillehammer.

The same day he unexpectedly travelled back to Stockholm and on the morning of 27 June was found dead at the top of the staircase in an apartment building at Rindögatan 42 on Gärdet. He was found by the porter's wife, shot in the right side of the head, lying in a pool of blood at the top of the staircase, outside the door to the elevator room. Some hours earlier she had found his rucksack and travel bag outside the entrance. The body was found with 1,200 NOK, a large sum at that time (equal to more than 20,000 NOK, or over $3,000 in 2012), something that seemed to rule out robbery as a motive for murdering him.

According to the Swedish police Holst had rung the doorbell and had been let in by one of the tenants, but had not then visited that apartment. The policeman who first saw the body reported that the pistol (Holst's own, a Spanish Llama Colt 9mm) was in Holst's right hand, with his finger on the trigger. The gun was removed by the police officer before the criminal police came. There is no photograph or sketch of the body at the site, only photographs from the autopsy.

Even though the case was investigated as a possible murder, the Swedish police quickly concluded that it was suicide. The criminal technicians test fired the weapon found in Holst's hand and found that it was the same as the one that fired the bullet found in the staircase where Holst had been found dead. Of the 28 tenants in the building, only three were questioned by the police during the investigation. In addition to limited questioning of possible witnesses, there were several other deficiencies in the investigation; there was no detailed description of the place he was found and information that was routinely collected during murder investigations was not recorded.

Kai Christian Middelthon Holst was buried at Vestre gravlund in Oslo. The grave is marked with a simple headstone on which his name, birth and death are carved.

== "The Holst Case" ==
=== Suicide or murder? ===
Holst's family, many of his friends and colleagues in the resistance movement, among them Hans Ringvold and Erik Myhre, held the opinion that Holst was murdered. Among the theories colleagues and friends put forward about a possible murder was liquidation by a foreign intelligence service, be it from Germany, Sweden, the Soviet Union or the US.

=== Threats ===
Holst's family did their own research regarding his death. Holst's sister, Else Heyerdahl-Larsen, contacted Norwegian authorities, but was warned against looking into the case as it could be dangerous. Ole Otto Paus, then an army captain, later a major general, was married to the sister of Holst's widow and in 1945 in Oslo he saw the documents from the police investigation when he tried to check the case. Paus found it especially troubling that Holst had bought sleeping car tickets from Stockholm to Oslo for his wife and himself for the day after he was found dead. When he wanted to check the documents again two years later, they were gone.

Paus was warned by a high-ranking Norwegian police officer, the jurist Olav Svendsen, former chief of the juridical office (Norwegian: Rettskontoret, a Norwegian intelligence organisation in neutral Sweden) against continued research into Holst's death. The same police officer also threatened Holst's widow and wife to leave the case. Ole Otto Paus was also warned by the chief of defence, Lieutenant General Ole Berg (former chief of the military office Mi2 and Mi4 at the Norwegian legation in Stockholm), against any further research into the case, as he risked his life by doing so.

=== Renewed research ===
In the 1990s, Holst relatives contacted the lawyer Jan Heftye Blehr. Blehr contacted Rettsmedisinsk institutt (the Norwegian forensic institute) in order to reexamine the autopsy of Holst. The pathologist Olving stated that: "from the findings at the autopsy there is nothing that speaks against that it could be a suicide. There is however nothing that rules out that it could be a murder". On the basis of Major General Paus' statements, the Ministry of Justice and Public Security took up the case and in 1995 the historian Trond Bergh was in Stockholm and got to see what material the Swedish security police Säpo had that was related to Holst's case. According to the Minister of Justice, Grete Faremo, no new information was found.

Professor Magne Skodvin at Norway's Resistance Museum looked into the case the same year. The museum used material collected by retired Supreme Court judge Einar Løchen on behalf of Ole Borge, one of Milorg's leaders and veterans, who believed Holst had been liquidated. Borge and Løchen believed it was the communists who had murdered Holst, and the same view was held by the former XU agent Wiggo Ljøner. Professor Skodvin noted certain shortcomings in the police investigation, but concluded that from the material, it was clear that the cause of death was suicide.

=== Questions ===
Among the strange circumstances of the case is that Holst's dossier at the Swedish security police has been removed from the archive. Professor Tore Pryser claims that with the level of detail Säpo went into in similar cases there must have been a dossier: "Everything points to the information about Holst having been destroyed." There is however some information relating to Holst in dossiers regarding three other persons. The witness statements regarding his whereabouts when arriving in Stockholm and who he was together with the night he died are also contradictory.

Holst was found dead in an apartment building where the German intelligence organisation, the Abwehr, had a cover apartment, while a British SIS agent lived in the apartment building next door. The man who opened the door via intercom was Svante Holger Ahreson, an acquaintance of Holst's. According to Ahreson's statement to the Swedish police he had only heard mumbling, thought it was someone who had called the wrong apartment, and went back to bed when no one turned up at his apartment. According to Ahreson's daughter, Holst did however have an agreement with him to lodge Norwegian resistance fighters who were under threat, and Holst was therefore in close contact with Ahreson and not some distant acquaintance. According to her, contradicting what he told the Swedish police, Ahreson had recognised Holst's voice on the intercom, waited for him to arrive at the apartment, which did not happen, but registered that the elevator passed, heard voices and after that a gunshot.

According to the Swedish police Holst was found with the pistol in his right hand, something that has been interpreted as a sign of suicide. Gun experts do however say that it is highly unusual for a handgun to remain in the dead person's hand, as the recoil combined with almost immediate loss of muscle firmness will result in the weapon falling out of the person's hand. That the body was found with the gun in its right hand is also something that provoked a strong reaction from the family, as according to them Holst was left-handed. In the Swedish police's 32-page report about the case the conclusion of suicide is written in only one place: on the front page, the forensic pathologist who performed Holst's autopsy wrote Suicidum, Latin for suicide. The same physician who in his autopsy report drew no conclusion concerning how Holst died, suicide or murder, signed the police report, but according to Swedish handwriting experts the signature has been forged.

Holst's superior in Stockholm in 1945, Wladimir Mörch Hansson, said that Holst received death threats, and found the lack of Swedish assistance in solving the case impossible to explain.

Odd Feydt, active in the resistance group 2A and in 1943 leader of Sambandskontoret (a Norwegian intelligence office in neutral Sweden) stated that Holst was followed (tailed) during his last trip from Lillehammer to Stockholm and that Holst's death might be connected with cooperation between the Norwegian Rettskontoret and the Swedish intelligence organisation C-byrån.

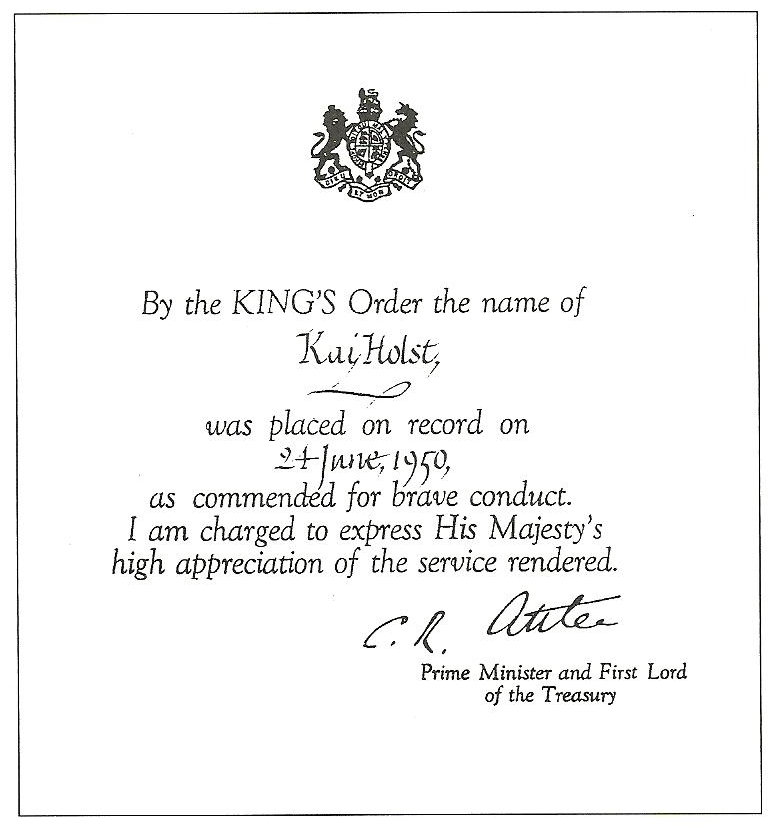
A certificate in which Kai Holst is posthumously honoured by the British King for brave conduct and is thanked for services rendered. The document was issued on 24 June 1950 and was signed by the British prime minister Clement Attlee.

The Swedish professor Ingvar Bergström, who had worked for C-byrån in Gothenburg during the war, was of the opinion that Holst had been murdered. He first stated that the liquidation had been ordered at "high levels within Milorg" but later on changed his opinion, in consultation with the retired landshövding and historian Per Nyström, to its having been done by the Swedes in cooperation with the Norwegians. Holst's close colleague during the war, the Milorg leader Jens Christian Hauge, has been criticised for refusing to assist in casting light on the case. In connection with the press coverage of the case in 1994 Hauge issued a press statement in which he stated that he did not have any specific knowledge of the case, and concluded with the following: "It would be a great relief for me and for all of Kai Holst's remaining comrades if this sad case could be solved."

=== Operation Claw ===
The question has been asked whether Kai Holst's death could be connected with his task at Lillehammer, a hypothesis primarily put forward by the historian Tore Pryser. Holst might have had with him information from Lillehammer that could damage the operation later known as "Operation Claw" (in Norwegian Lillehammer-kuppet). Odd Feydt stated that when Holst travelled back to Stockholm, he was tailed from the moment he passed the Norwegian-Swedish border. The information about Operation Claw was secret in the years after the war and even today is not all available. A report in the British National Archives is classified until 2020.

Kai Holst never received any decoration from Norwegian authorities for his wartime efforts, in spite of his superior Wladimir Mørch Hansson recommending one to the council of the resistance forces in January 1946. He was however posthumously commended by George VI of Great Britain on 24 June 1950 for Brave Conduct. The question has been raised of why Britain chose to honour Holst, as he never officially worked for the British. Tore Pryser has put forward the thesis that Holst, who in addition to his work for Milorg also was in the service of the British SIS, was killed by Swedish intelligence to prevent him from reporting Operation Claw to the SIS.

== Documentaries ==
- Göran Elgemyr: Den mystiska kofferten från Lillehammer and Liket på Gärdet i Stockholm, Sveriges Radio P-1, 17 and 20 April 1992
- Mysteriet Holst, Ekkofilm, 2012, aired by the Norwegian Broadcasting Corporation (NRK) on 1 April 2013 and by the Swedish Broadcasting Corporation (SVT) in May 2013
