= Pelle group =

Norwegian saboteurs in WWII

The Pelle group (Norwegian: Pelle-gruppen) was a Norwegian resistance group that conducted acts of sabotage against the German occupation of Norway in Østlandet during the autumn of 1944.

Aftenposten called the group's 23 November 1944 ship sabotage "the largest Norwegian sabotage attack during World War Two", which included the blowing up of 6 ships and one crane at two ship yards. The attack possibly significantly decreased the number of soldiers from the retreating Lapland Army who were made available at the Battle of the Ardennes, according to Lars Borgersrud.

16 operations have been attributed to the group. 7 of its members were executed in 1945.

The leader was Ragnar "Pelle" Sollie, the only one in the group who was a member of Communist Party of Norway.

A 2015 Klassekampen article said that the group—alongside the Osvald Group—were "not «communist» but they were led by" the communists Ragnar Sollie and [in the case of the Osvald Group,] Asbjørn «Osvald» Sunde".

== History ==
In the summer of 1944 the group attacked a mechanics factory at Fetsund; one member was killed when dynamite ignited ahead of schedule.

The group's finances were provided by robbing an office that was responsible for paying salaries to company employees—Oslo Sporveiers lønnskontor. The take was Norwegian kroner 125 000.

=== 23 November 1944 attack ===
The 23 November 1944 sabotage attack resulted in the blowing up of 6 ships, one crane, two drydocks—at two ship yards (Nylands Verksted and Akers Mekaniske Verksted).

The explosions were preceded by two tons of dynamite being smuggled from Sollihøgda into Oslo, after the dynamite was stolen by Leif Kjemperud and others. (The smuggling was carried out by subdivision of the Pelle Group—the Ullevål Hageby Gang. Sverre Kokkin and others bicycled, with dynamite, from Hønefoss to Oslo. Dynamite was also transported to Oslo by lorry, hidden in potato sacks. "When the lorry was stopped at check point, they only saw potatoes. During transfer and reloading, one of the sacks opened" and dynamite spilled onto the sidewalk, and the driver did not know what he had been a part of.) The dynamite was stored at Kampen, Oslo by a different subdivision of the group. Shipyard employees smuggled the dynamite into their workplace, where it was stored under one of the "boats".

At the shipyard, workers and foremen brought the explosives onto the ship, in pockets, lunch boxes and tool boxes.

The six ships destroyed included one war ship—"Bolivar", and M/S Troma (owned by a Norwegian firm).

The workers at the shipyards who smuggled the dynamite, were able to escape to Sweden. Of five shipwrights who participated after being trained by Sollie, three changed their name after the war. (The five shipwrights were Ellef Baastad, Osvald Kristiansen, Gunnar Andersen, Johan Grønholdt and Erik Marcussen.)

=== After the 23 November 1944 attack ===
During late winter of 1945, a woman who had an affair with one of the group's members reported to authorities that the man had a gunshot wound to the stomach. The man and his brother were arrested by the Gestapo. The brothers "were not able to take the torture. Within an hour and a half, Gestapo were on their way to our home", said Sverre Kokkin.

11 of its members were sentenced to death in February 1945, but only six were executed. Five survived until the end of the war. However, three other members were executed in March 1945. Several members were executed at the Akershus Fortress and their bodies thrown into the Oslofjord.

== Organization ==
The group had about 100 saboteurs. Subdivisions of the group included the Ullevål Hageby Gang and the Losby Gang.

== After the war ==
=== Recognition ===
No member has ever received medals for their actions during World War II, from Norway's government. In 2013 one of the two members who is still alive, Sverre Kokkin said that if he gets a medal, it probably will be post mortem. In a 2013 article on NRK, Øystein Rakkenes and Morten Conradi (directors of a 2013 film about the Pelle Group) said "... why [Max] Manus has been credited for the big ship sabotage action (skipssabotasjeaksjonen ) in 1944 at the port of Oslo?" The directors also said "It was first when the members of Pelle Group—Sverre Kokkin and Leif Kjemperud—protested in 2010, that the monument [of Max Manus] at last was moved to Akershus festning"—[from the site of the 1944 ship sabotage at present day Aker Brygge].

Later in 2013 Ronald Bye—a former Party Secretary of the Labour Party—wrote in Norwegian daily Aftenposten that "It is not about the content of an obituary, a lunch with the defence minister who presented a tray as a gift, and that now (November 22) there will be unveiled a monument to commemorate the Pelle Group. It is about the 'retouching' of the group's members in regards to an official recognition for the efforts on behalf of the Resistance. The reason; the members were stigmatized and many of them were put under surveillance as communists—in lee of the hunt for fifth columnists during the Cold War... But my point is to front the criticism of the bad treatment that the Pelle Group officially got from Norwegian authorities. For example this was expressed by not being granted honors such as Den norsk deltakermedaljen, War Cross, Forsvarsmedaljen, Forsvarets hederskors, and Haakon VIIs 70-årsmedalje. - These are honours that—with a generous hand—has been awarded to others who participated in the Resistance fight during the war."

A 30 October 2013 Dagsavisen article quoted from a speech (honoring the group) by the former minister of defence: "Who chose to follow the narrow path of courage ... And here were people from the entire political spectrum. Still, the cold relationship between East and West came to make life difficult for some. We know that some in the Pelle Group were inflicted with unreasonably great strain. In the clear light of hindsight, this is something that we today can confirm."

In 2015 Lars Borgersrud said that "Norwegian war history has focused on sabotage attacks performed and planned from England" [...] They were trained by professional soldiers, by the British. The saboteurs of the Pelle Group and the Osvald Group, were ordinary people who had no access to weapons and equipment, other than what they were able to get their hands on. Their effort can not be evaluated in the same manner. [...] To compare with those who operated in Norway, independently from Milorg, becomes difficult. Usually this was workers who sabotaged their own firms".

==== Monument in Oslo ====
In 2010, the city council of Oslo passed a resolution to build a monument to honor the Pelle group.

In December 2011, 3 members of the Pelle group criticized the council's Finance committee for not allocating the "originally proposed Norwegian kroner 1.75 million" in the proposed budget for 2012.

In 2013 Aftenposten said that three years ago Max Manus was honored with a monument at Aker Brygge, and that the "Placement led to protest, since it was the Pelle Group that performed the sabotage of ships here. The monument was therefore moved to below Akershus Fortress, where Max Manus led the sabotage attack on [steamship] Donau. - But the commotion regarding the placement, put the Pelle Group on the map. The city council decided that the Pelle Group also would receive a monument, and that it was to be placed at Aker Brygge."

It was financed by a Norwegian firm—Samlerhuset.

===== After completion =====
On 22 November 2013 the monument was unveiled, after a ceremony in the city hall of Oslo with crown prince Haakon and Oslo's mayor sitting alongside Reidar Formo and Sverre Kokkin (the two last surviving member of the Pelle Group).

The names of 63 persons are listed on the monument, including saboteurs of the group and facilitators.

Klassekampen has highlighted tireless effort, regarding the monument, by Erling Folkvord, historian Lars Borgersrud, Morten Conradi and Øystein Rakkenes, and mentioning Gunnar Sønsteby as an ally to the project.

A description of the monument says that it "... shows two young men running with banner and rifle; and a woman carrying a handbag with illegal newspapers".

== Members ==
The group had only one who was a member of Norges Kommunistiske Parti — Ragnar Sollie.

Leif Kjemperud was also a member of Osvald Group.

Ludvig Hansen was the group's youngest, around 18 years old.

=== Hageby Gang ===
Members of the Hageby Gang, also known as the Ullevål Hageby Gang included Sverre Kokkin

Reidar Formoe was the designated executioner of group members who were wounded and supposedly would not be able to escape the scene of attack.

== See also ==
- Leif Kjemperud
