= Martin Rasmussen Hjelmen =

Norwegian sailor and communist activist (1904–1944)

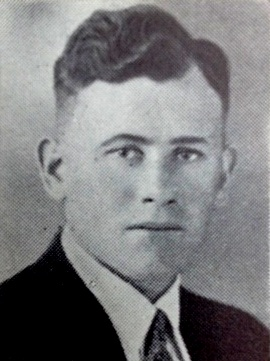
- Born: 24 January 1904
- Died: 30 May 1944 (aged 40)
- Occupation: Sailor
- Known for: Resistance fighter

Martin Rasmussen Hjelmen (24 January 1904 – 30 May 1944) was a Norwegian sailor and communist activist.

He was born in Herdla Municipality (now part of Øygarden Municipality). He went to work at sea from the age of fifteen, and was based in Australia in the 1920s. Upon returning to Norway he settled in Ski Municipality.

He chaired the Norwegian branch of the Wollweber League from 1936 to 1938. He was arrested in Sweden in February 1940, and later handed over to the Gestapo. He was sentenced to death and executed in Brandenburg-Görden Prison in May 1944.

He was the first leader of the Osvald Group, until he in 1938 transferred to Saborg in Bergen.
