= Norsk historie (Samlaget) =

1999 book about the history of Norway

Norsk historie is a six-volume work about the general history of Norway. It was released in 1999 by Det Norske Samlaget.

The books which became volumes four, five and six in the series had been published before, but the time spans covered in those books were modified slightly. Some of the books have also been reissued after 2000. A Samlaget release, all the books are written in Nynorsk.

The first volume, Norsk historie 800–1300: frå høvdingmakt til konge- og kyrkjemakt. 1850–1900 was written by Jón Viðar Sigurðsson. The second volume, Norsk historie 1300–1625: eit rike tek form was written by Geir Atle Ersland and Hilde Sandvik. The third volume, Norsk historie 1625–1814: vegar til sjølvstende was written by Ståle Dyrvik. The fourth volume, Norsk historie 1814–1860: frå standssamfunn mot klassesamfunn was written by Tore Pryser. The fifth volume, Norsk historie 1860–1914: eit bondesamfunn i oppbrot was written by Trond Bergh. The sixth volume, Norsk historie 1914–2000: industrisamfunnet – frå vokstervisse til framtidstvil was written by Berge Furre.

The six volumes span about 2000 pages.
