= Norwegian Labour Movement Archives and Library =

Archival institution in Norway

- Arbeiderbevegelsens arkiv og bibliotek (Arbark)

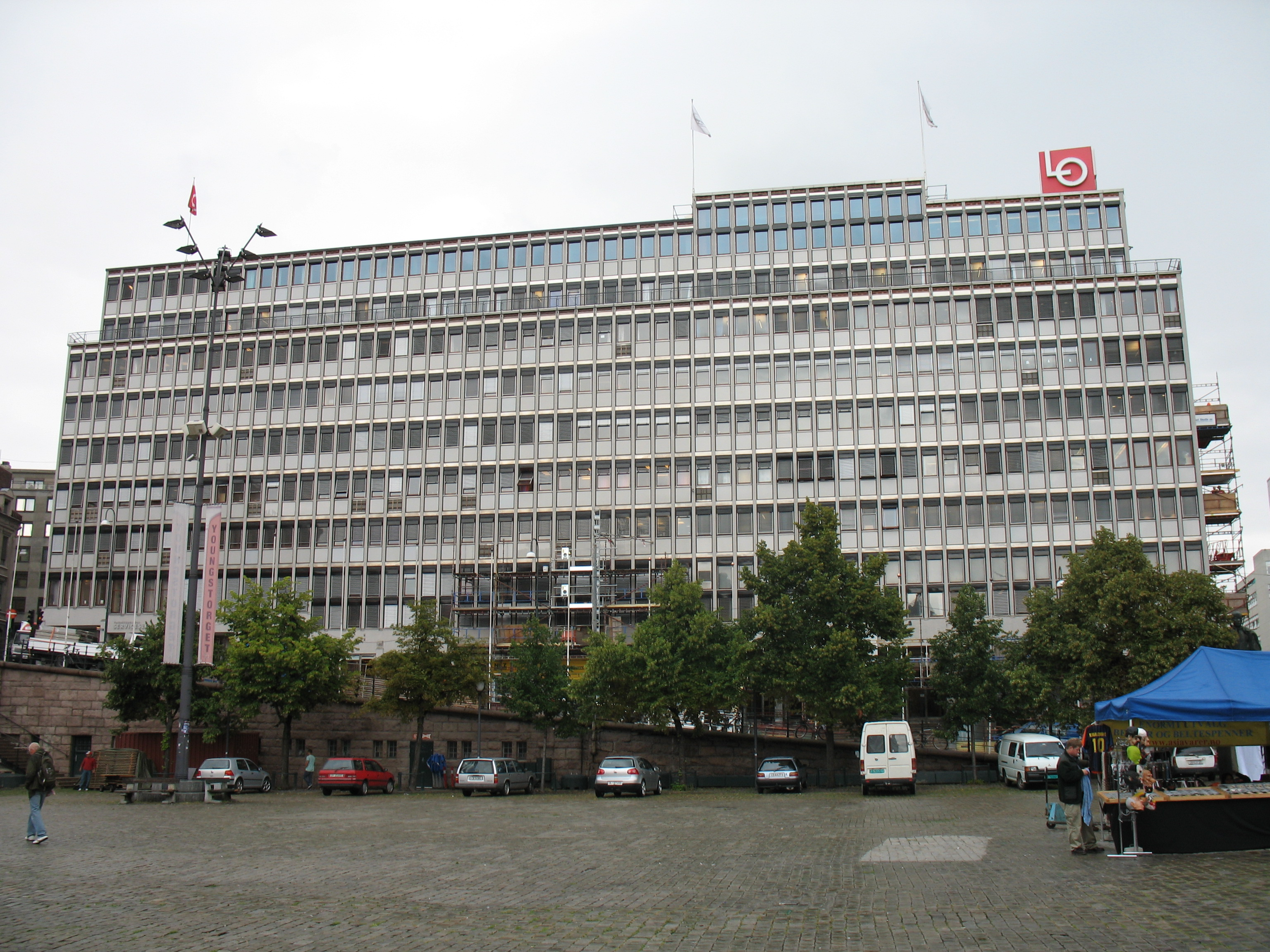
- Located on the fifth floor of the People's House
- 59.9153°N 10.7498°E
- Location: Torggata 12, 0181 Oslo, Norway
- Type: Labor history
- Established: 1905

Collection
- Size: 1.5 million photographs, 135,000 books, about 465 banners, 70 films, & numerous audio records

Other information
- Director: Frank Meyer
- Parent organisation: Norwegian Confederation of Trade Unions (LO)
- Affiliation: International Association of Labour History Institutions
- Website: www.arbark.no

The Norwegian Labour Movement Archives and Library (Norwegian: Arbeiderbevegelsens arkiv og bibliotek, Arbark) is an archival and historical institution in Oslo, Norway, opened in 1909. It was established and is still owned by the Norwegian Confederation of Trade Unions and the Labour Party.

== History ==
The initiative to establish Arbark was taken in 1905 following a Swedish model. It was established and is still owned by the Norwegian Confederation of Trade Unions and the Labour Party. In 1908, Arbark started to work in the People's House in Oslo, Norway. Since 1972 it has received government funding.

Arbark is the Norwegian Labour movement's eldest cultural organization and the largest, privately owned record repository in Norway. It is Norway's largest library dedicated to the labour movement and other social movements. Its collections consist of, among other things, about 7,000 shelf meters of records, 1.5 million photographs, 135,000 books, about 465 banners, 70 films and numerous audio records. Important parts of Arbark's collections are continuously being digitized and are available on its homepage.

During World War II, many of the documents were taken by Nazi Germany and subsequently lost.

Arbark's purpose is to preserve and communicate the Norwegian labour movement's as well as other social movements' cultural heritage. The main purpose is to document the history of all movements connected to the Norwegian political left in a broad sense, such as the feminist, peace, and solidarity movements, in addition to the social-democratic trade unions and labour parties. This feature distinguishes Arbark from similar institutions in other countries, which more often are connected to only one or a few of the political branches of the labour movement. The current director of Arbark is the historian Frank Meyer, who succeeded Knut Einar Eriksen in 2011.

== Networks ==
Arbark is a member of national and international networks of individuals and institutions working with the history of the labour movement's cultural heritage. Internationally, Arbark collaborates with other member institutions of the International Association of Labour History Institutions (IALHI). Arbark publishes the peer-reviewed journal Arbeiderhistorie ("Labor History") annually.

== See also ==
- List of libraries in Norway
