= Haakon Bingen =

Norwegian economist and civil servant

Haakon Bingen (22 September 1918 – 16 March 2002) was a Norwegian economist and civil servant.

== History ==
He was born in Trøgstad, and studied economy at the University of Oslo. When the university was closed during the occupation of Norway by Nazi Germany, he found work in Statistics Norway. After the war he returned to his studies, graduated with the cand.oecon. degree in 1946, studied briefly at Harvard University before being hired in the International Monetary Fund. Bingen is the father of political scientist Jon Bingen. He died in March 2002 following a short-term illness.

== Career ==
Bingen was a member of the Norwegian Labour Party in 1948. He was also a chairman of Sosialistisk Forum and Sosialistiske økonomers forening, and was a central member of Folkebevegelsen mot EF, which rejected Norwegian membership in the European Communities in 1972. He rather wanted an independent cooperative organization between the Nordic countries.

In 1949, he was hired as a part-time consultant in the Norwegian Ministry of Finance. From 1 June 1950 to 1 September 1988 he worked as the secretary for the Standing Committee on Finance and Economic Affairs in the Parliament of Norway. At his retirement, the book Med Finanskomiteen i arbeid was published.

In the 1990s, Bingen was involved in an unusual case. He sued the academics Trond Bergh and Knut Einar Eriksen as well as the publishing house Cappelen Akademiske Forlag, because the second volume of the work Den hemmelige krigen (The secret war) contained information that portrayed Bingen as a close friend of communist Peder Furubotn. In late 1999, the Supreme Court of Norway found that this was not true, and circulation of the book was forbidden, until the reference to Bingen had been amended; in addition Bingen was awarded 146,975 kr of costs.
