= Asbjørn Sunde =

Norwegian politician (1909–1985)

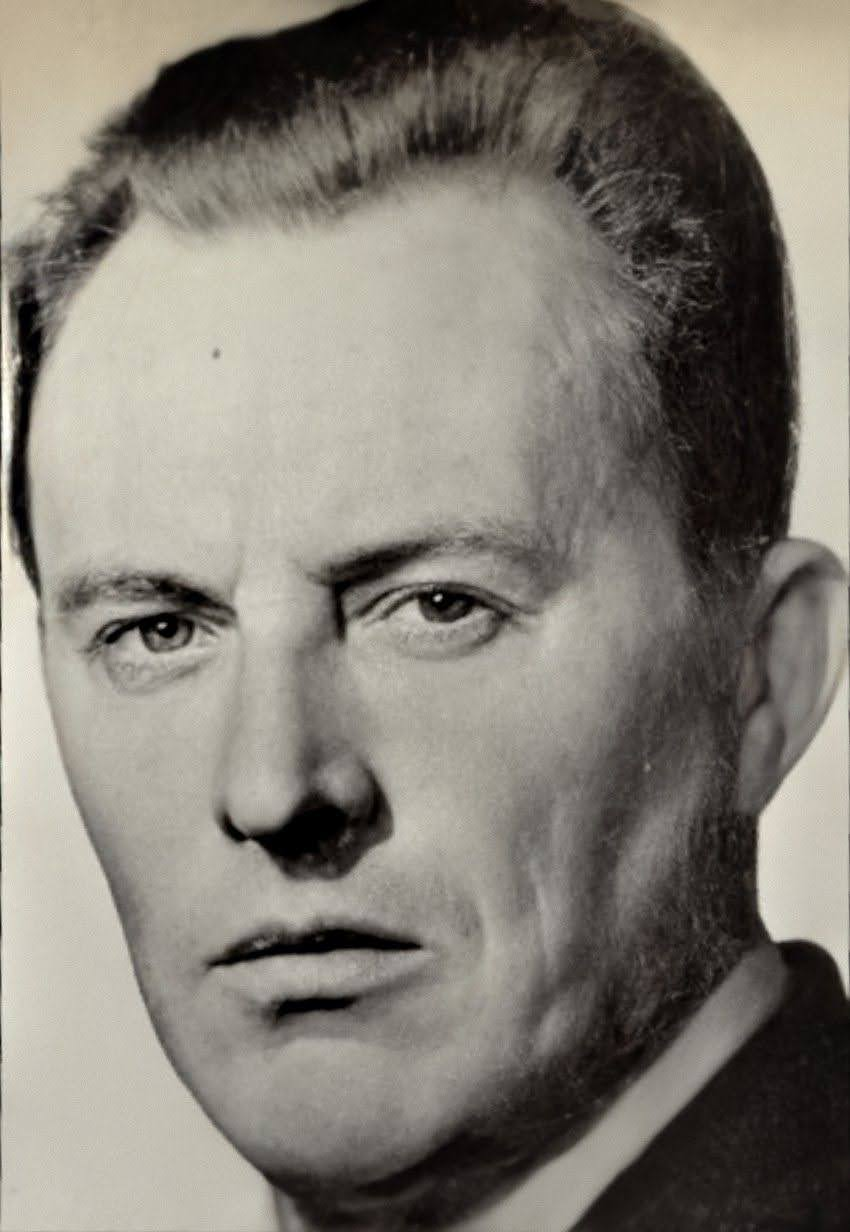
- Nickname: Osvald
- Born: 12 December 1909; Vikna Municipality, Norway
- Died: 23 April 1985 (aged 75) Oslo, Norway
- Allegiance: (Second Spanish Republic) Spanish Republic (Norway) Osvald Group; Soviet Union
- Service years: 1940–1944
- Conflicts: Spanish Civil War; Second World War
- Awards: (Soviet Union) Medal "For the Victory over Germany in the Great Patriotic War 1941–1945" (Norway) Defence Medal
- Other work: Author

Asbjørn Edvin Sunde (12 December 1909 – 23 April 1985) was a Norwegian politician for the Communist Party of Norway, communist partisan during the Spanish Civil War, saboteur against the Nazi occupation of Norway during the Second World War, and a convicted Soviet spy. During the Second World War, from 1941 to 1944, Sunde's group, the Osvald Group, carried out approximately 39 acts of sabotage and assassination against the German occupation forces and Norwegian collaborators. In 1954 he was convicted by Eidsivating Court of Appeal of treason and espionage in favour of the Soviet Union, and sentenced to eight years in prison. He was released from prison in 1959 after serving two thirds of his sentence. He was expelled from the Communist Party of Norway in 1970.

== Early life ==
Sunde had served a 30-month stint in the Royal Norwegian Navy, rising to non-commissioned officer rank in 1930. He was trained as both a first mate, a navigator and a gunner. He was married, and the father of one son. For several years he sailed in the Norwegian merchant marine. In the years preceding the Second World War, Sunde joined the Communist Party of Norway, wrote for the communist daily Arbeideren and was involved with work to aid and support the labourers and unemployed in his home town Horten.

== Spanish Civil War ==
Following the outbreak of the Spanish Civil War in 1936, Sunde played a central role in the early efforts of the Communist Party of Norway in support of the Spanish Republic. In January 1937 Sunde led a group of four volunteers he had personally recruited from Oslo to the headquarters of the International Brigades in Albacete, Spain. Sunde, who spoke Spanish, first served as a front line ambulance driver in Spain, before requesting transfer to a Republican special operations unit as a saboteur and partisan, operating behind Nationalist lines. Among the tasks Sunde carried out in the unit was railway sabotage. While in Spain he also wrote letters, describing his experiences and the situation in Spain, that were published in Arbeideren. Sunde left Spain in the summer of 1938, returning to Norway.

== Wollweber League ==
From 1938 he was the leader of the Norwegian branch of Ernst Wollweber's secret sabotage organization, whose actions were directed against Fascist-controlled shipping. The Wollweber League had been established as an initiative of the Soviet NKVD.

== Second World War ==
Following the German attack on the Soviet Union in June 1941, Sunde's group initiated sabotage activities in Norway. The group, consisting predominately of sailors, dockworkers and industrial labourers, was responsible for some 39 known actions between July 1941 and July 1944, dominating sabotage activity in Norway during this period. One of Sunde's cover names was Osvald, and his group became known as the Osvald Group (Osvald-gruppen). The group's main area of operations was Buskerud.

According to historian Lars Borgersrud, Sunde's renown as an aggressive and daring saboteur, led other resistance organisations to approach him to carry out particularly delicate missions, in particular assassinations. After attacking the Oslo and Aker offices of the State Police 21 August 1942, a reward of 50,000 NOK was offered for information that would lead to his capture.

=== Breakout from surrounded building ===
On 30 May 1944 he and 8 other members of "Osvald" are surrounded by German forces, at a former hotel ("Sollia") in Søndre Land Municipality in Oppland county. *Signe Raassum

== Post-war activities ==
After the war Sunde wrote the book Menn i mørket (1947) (Men in the Darkness), describing his wartime activities. Sunde received an award (deltagermedaljen in bronze)—by certified mail—from the Norwegian government.

In 2013, then minister of defence honored 8 members—of the 17 who are still alive. Sunde and his organization received award and recognition the Soviet Union for their contributions during the war.

The more famous and acknowledged partisan Gunnar Sønsteby unsuccessfully spoke in favour of giving Sunde a war pension, which was given to both the merchant sailors and the military branch of the resistance.

Sunde played a central role in the internal conflicts of the Communist Party of Norway in the late 1940s. The struggle culminated with the expulsion of former chairman Peder Furubotn and a number of other so-called "Titoists" in 1949/1950.

=== Conviction for treason and espionage ===
From 1949 the Norwegian Police Surveillance Agency began a surveillance operation against Sunde, leading to his arrest five years later on suspicion of espionage. In 1954 Sunde was convicted for treason and espionage for the Soviet Union, and sentenced to 8 years imprisonment. After serving two thirds of his sentence, he was paroled from prison in 1959. After his parole, he lived a quiet life.

Terje Ranes who portrayed Sunde in a 2015 film, said that Sunde "was a Stalinist hardliner, but there are many questions surrounding the trial against him ".

== Film ==
A film, Offer eller spion? ("victim or spy?") was scheduled to be shown on Thursday [19 February 2015] at Ringen Kino in Oslo, Norway.

== Biographies ==
- Egil Ulateig: Raud krigar, raud spion, 1989. (Red Warrior, Red Spy; biography) (in Norwegian)
- Asbjørn Sunde: Menn i mørket, 1947. (Men in the Darkness; autobiography) (in Norwegian). Reissued in 2009, with foreword by Lars Borgersrud

== Bibliography ==
- Moen, Jo Stein; Rolf Sæther (2009). Tusen dager – Norge og den spanske borgerkrigen 1936–1939 (in Norwegian). Oslo: Gyldendal Norsk Forlag. ISBN 978-82-05-39351-6.
