= Trond Bergh =

Norwegian economic historian

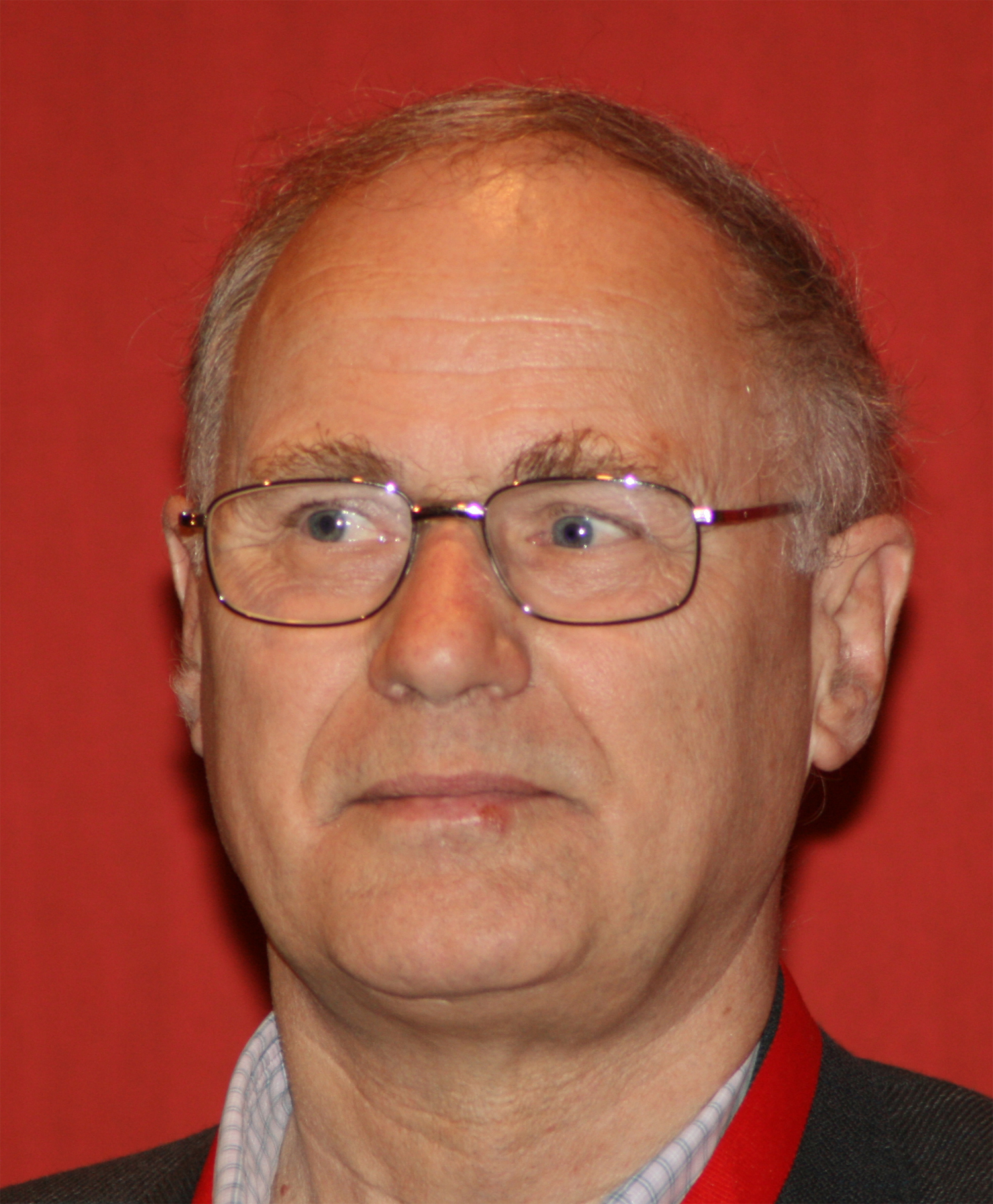
Trond Bergh

Trond Bergh (born 16 September 1946) is a Norwegian economic historian, and researcher at the Department of Innovation and Economic Organisation of the BI Norwegian Business School.

== Life and work ==
Bergh was born in Tvedestrand, and took the cand.philol. degree at the University of Oslo in 1973.

Bergh was the director of the Labour Movement Archive and Library from 1989 to 1999, and was then employed at the Centre for Business History and, later at the Department of Innovation and Economic Organisation of BI Norwegian Business School.

With the latter work Bergh became involved in a legal case. Former secretary of the Standing Committee on Finance and Economic Affairs Haakon Bingen sued Bergh and Eriksen as well as the publishing house Cappelen Akademiske Forlag, because the second volume of Den hemmelige krigen contained information that portrayed Bingen as a close friend of communist Peder Furubotn. In late 1999 the Supreme Court of Norway found that this was not true, and circulation of the book was forbidden, until the reference to Bingen had been amended. Bingen was also entitled to 146,975 kr of costs.

== Publications ==
Bergh's books on Norwegian economic history include Vekst og Velstand (1977), Norge fra u-land til i-land (1983) and Foredlet virke: Historien om Borregaard 1889–1989 (with Even Lange, 1989). He also penned Storhetstid 1945–1965, released 1987 as volume five of Arbeiderbevegelsens historie i Norge, and in 1998 he released the two-volume history on surveillance in Norway, Den hemmelige krigen: overvåking i Norge 1914–1997 about surveillance together with Knut Einar Eriksen.

Bergh has also written volume I of the two-volume series from 2004 on the railway history of Norway, Jernbanen i Norge 1854–2004, the first volume covering the period from 1854 to 1940.
