= Norman Iversen =

Norwegian politician (1910–1964)

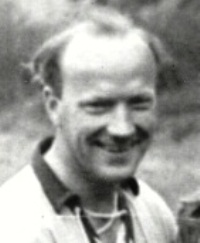
Norman Iversen

Norman Iversen (15 October 1910 – 1964) was a Norwegian sailor, resistance member and communist politician.

He volunteered in the Spanish Civil War from 1937 to 1938, as saboteur. Back in Norway, he was recruited to the Bergen branch of the Wollweber League. He reorganized and led the Bergen branch of the sabotage group Saborg from 1943 to 1944. He was arrested in November 1944, and imprisoned at Veiten in Bergen until the end of the war. He chaired the Bergen chapter of Norwegian Communist Party from 1947 to 1952.
