= Göran Elgemyr =

Swedish radio producer (born 1939)

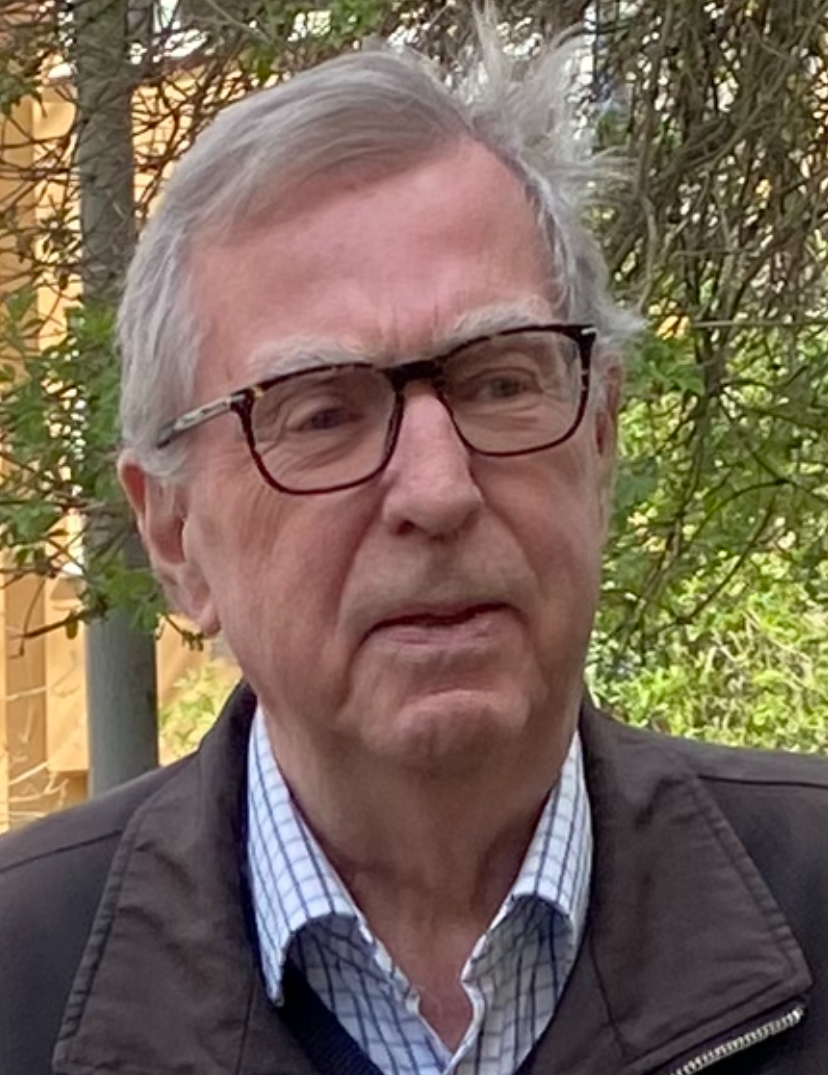
- Göran Elgemyr, in Stockholm, 2025
- Born: Carl Göran Elgemyr; 7 February 1939 (age 87); Falun, Sweden
- Education: Stockholm University (B.A.)
- Occupations: Journalist, producer, historian
- Employer: Sveriges Radio
- Awards: Guldspaden

Carl Göran Elgemyr (born 1939) is a Swedish radio producer, radio historian and author. He earned a Bachelor of Arts in 1970, and received an honorary doctorate from Stockholm University in 2015. In 1971, Swedish Radio (SR) employed him as a researcher at its press archive. From 1975 to 2000, he was a radio producer and reporter at Swedish Radio, producing programmes on contemporary Swedish and Nordic history, especially World War II.

In 1998, along with the former ambassador Sven Fredrik Hedin, Elgemyr was awarded the prestigious ‘Guldspaden’, a Swedish journalistic award for investigative journalism. His work encompassed researching and producing programmes concerning Swedish collaboration with Germany during World War II, including the resale of Nazi gold from central banks in occupied countries. Neutral Switzerland made similarly questionable purchases.

In 2015, Elgemyr wrote Kai Holsts mystiska död (The Mysterious Death of Kai Holst), published by Jure Publishing. The book discussed the Norwegian resistance fighter Kai Holst, who was found dead in Stockholm in June 1945. Elgemyr based the book on his two radio programmes from 1992, but expanded with archival material and investigations into the background of the death.

== Life and work ==
=== Background ===
Göran Elgemyr grew up in Falun, Hedemora, Sveg, Gävle and now live in Stockholm. In Gävle he gained his secondary school diploma in 1955. From 1956 to 1966, he was an assistant in a bookstore in Stockholm, primarily in Fritzes Kungl. Hovbokhandel. After further education at Heliskola – a private evening school – in Stockholm, Elgemyr studied political science, history of literature and modern history at Stockholm University.

The Department of Literary Sociology published his exam papers on the author Ivan Oljelund and the so-called treason trial in 1916. In a shortened version, both were published in the series Litteratur och samhälle (department of literary sociology, Uppsala University). They also published shortened versions in the journal Archive for Studies in the History of the Labour Movement (Arkiv för studier i arbetarrörelsens historia). Elgemyr received his Bachelor of Arts in 1970, and an honorary doctorate from Stockholm University in 2015.

=== Program activities ===
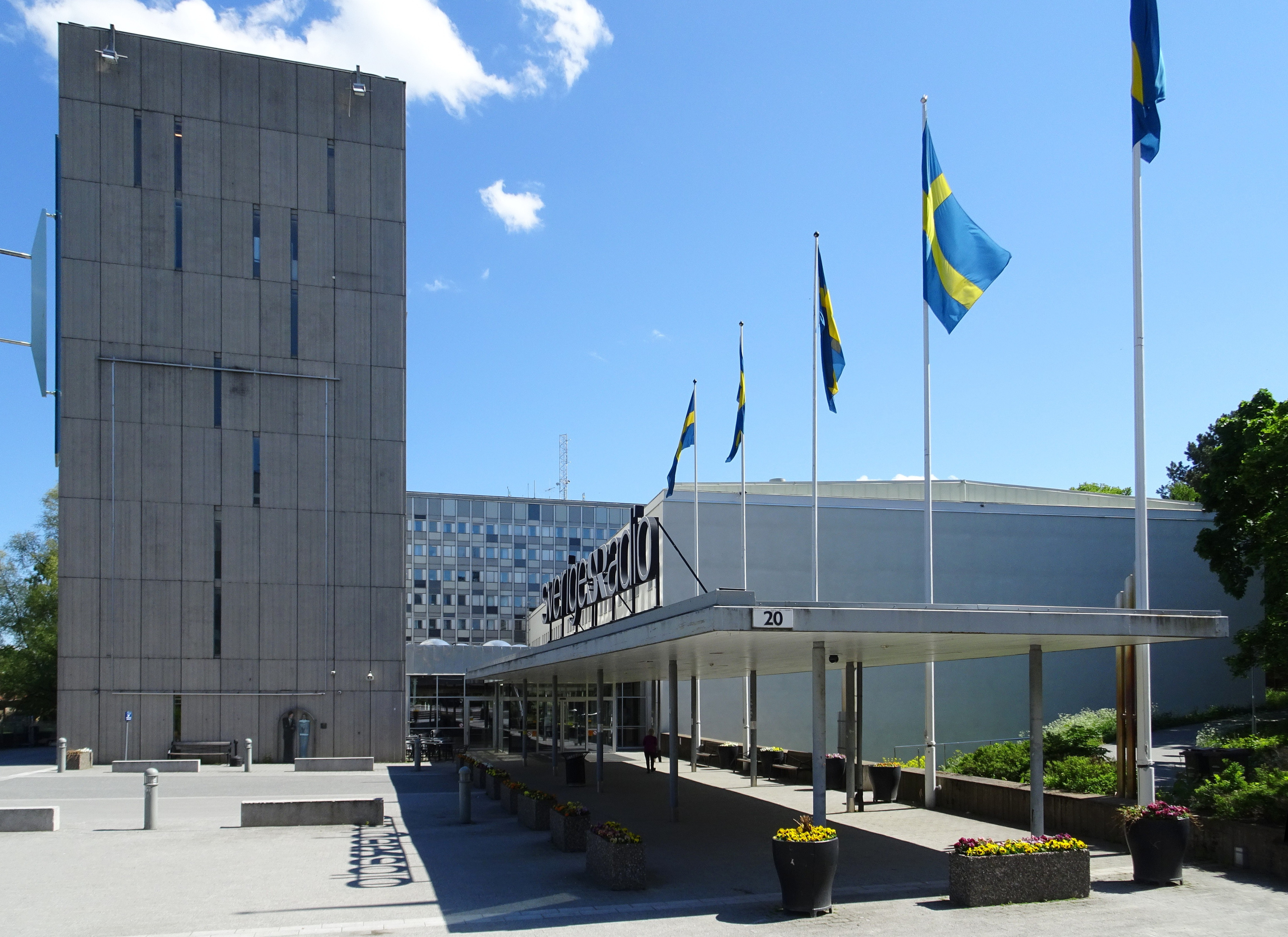
Radiohuset, Stockholm, June 2022, Göran Elgemyr's long-standing workplace

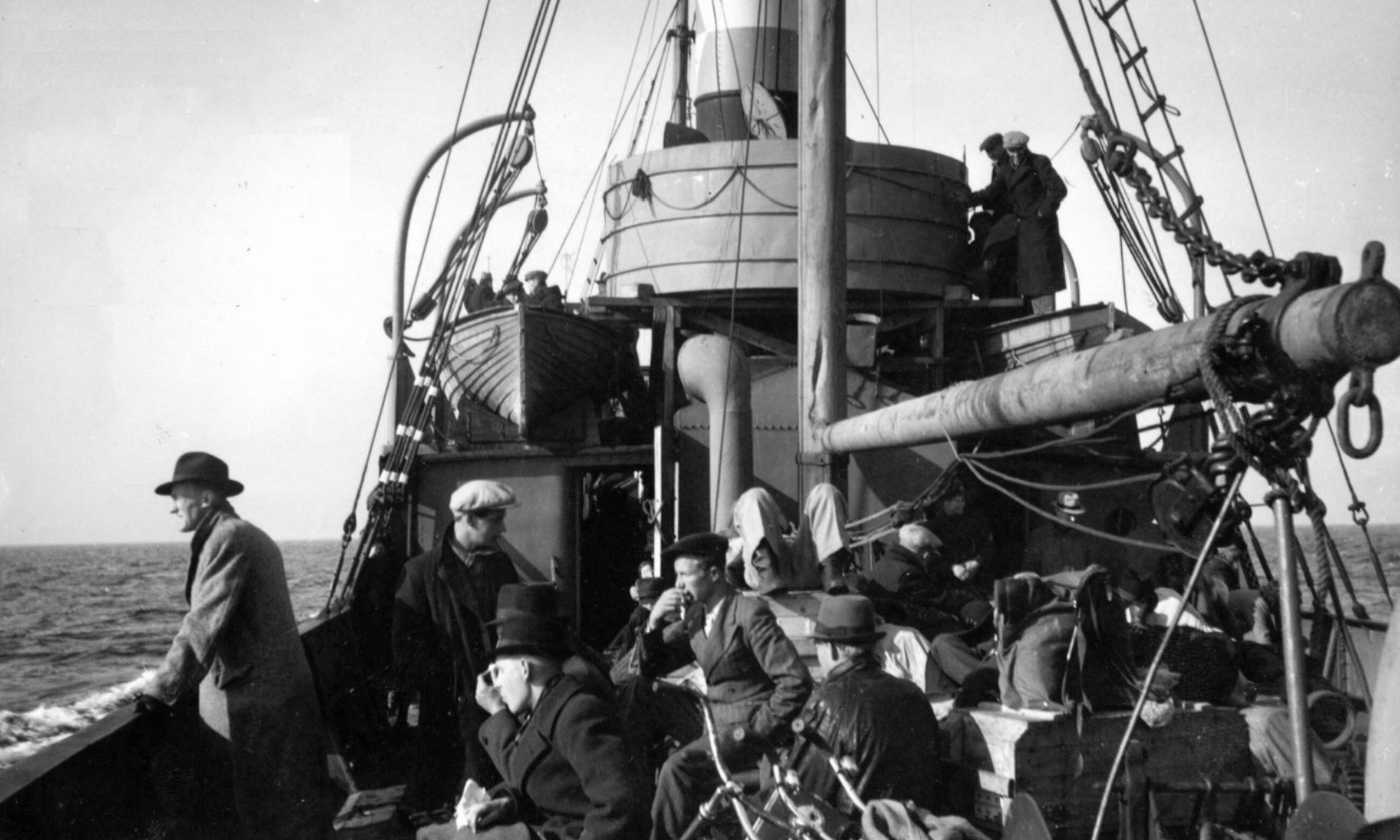
Finnish signals intelligence specialists aboard a ship from Närpes in Finland to Härnösand in Sweden during Operation Stella Polaris.

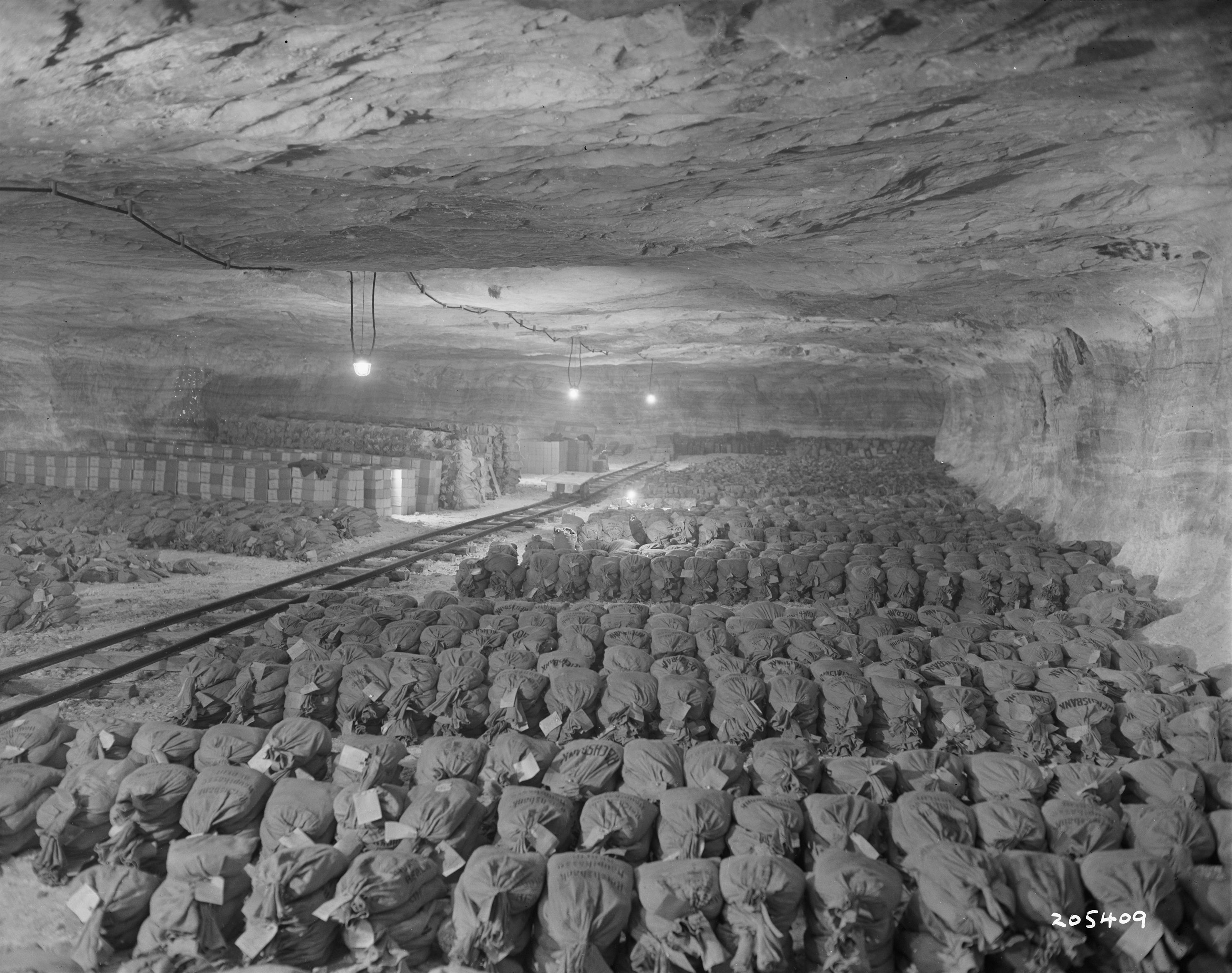
Banknotes, gold, art and other valuables, stolen by the Nazis, stored in a salt mine in Germany, and discovered by American soldiers in 1945

In 1971, Elgemyr worked as a researcher at the press archive at Swedish Radio (Ch1) From 1975 to 2000 he reported and produced programmes for the same radio station. He has also produced programmes for several editorial departments at SR: Radio Theatre (Radioteaterns dokumentärredaktion), the General editorial department (Allmänna redaktionen), Good Morning World! (God morgon Världen!), Plain Language (Klarspråk), Today’s Echo (Dagens Eko), and the Society Editorial Team (Samhällsredaktionen). From 1993 to 2000 he was a reporter on Studio A (Studio Ett), and P1 Morning (P1 Morgon).

Contemporary history has been central to Elgemyr’s productions, including the Nordic countries during World War II. Programmes include: Swedish neutrality and security policy. The Swedish Security Service (Säpo). Spy Cases. The Swedish Intelligence Service, and Radio History. Frequently, he has uncovered unknown, and often controversial, material. In 1944, when Finland was close to surrender, a Finnish government in exile was being prepared in Sweden. In an operation known as Stella Polaris, several hundred Finnish signals intelligence experts were transferred to Sweden. Elgemyr, along with producers Jörgen Cederberg and Jan Bergquist, successfully uncovered information regarding significant aspects of the operation, which had remained secret until 1977. They also revealed a private law agreement on the deposit of the intelligence, which was stored in two Swedish castles and then microfilmed. In 1983, Cederberg and Elgemyr published a thesis: “Operation Stella Polaris – Nordic Intelligence Cooperation in the Closing Stages of the Second World War”, in Clios goes spying. Eight essays on the history of intelligence.

=== Swedish-German Economic Cooperation During World War II ===
The peak of Göran Elgemyr's investigative journalism was his reporting with former ambassador Sven Fredrik Hedin in the late 1990s. In a unique collaboration between the newspaper Dagens Nyheter and Studio Ett, Sweden's purchase of gold from Germany during World War II, known as Nazi gold, or looted gold, was revealed by the two. The articles also focused on the flight of German business capital to Sweden, the Nazi looting of art treasures, the German smuggling of stolen diamonds to Sweden, and more. The stories attracted media attention from around the world.

The articles in Dagens Nyheter were based on archival studies in Bern and Zurich in Switzerland, and Washington D.C. in the US. In 1997, the Swedish government launched an inquiry into the matter. Following the attention that Elgemyr's and Hedin's articles received, Dagens Nyheter's editor-in-chief Arne Ruth chose to publish his own contribution to the newspaper. There were a collection of critical articles about Sweden during World War II, including two by Elgemyr and Hedin: "Who made money in World War II?" and "Naziguld. The Swedish Riksbank and Swedish companies acted as receivers in the largest robbery in history."

In 1998, Elgemyr and Hedin received the Guldspaden award for their articles and programs on the topic of Swedish-German economic cooperation during World War II. The Guldspaden is a prestigious Swedish award for investigative journalism.

=== Radio programs and book about Kai Holst ===
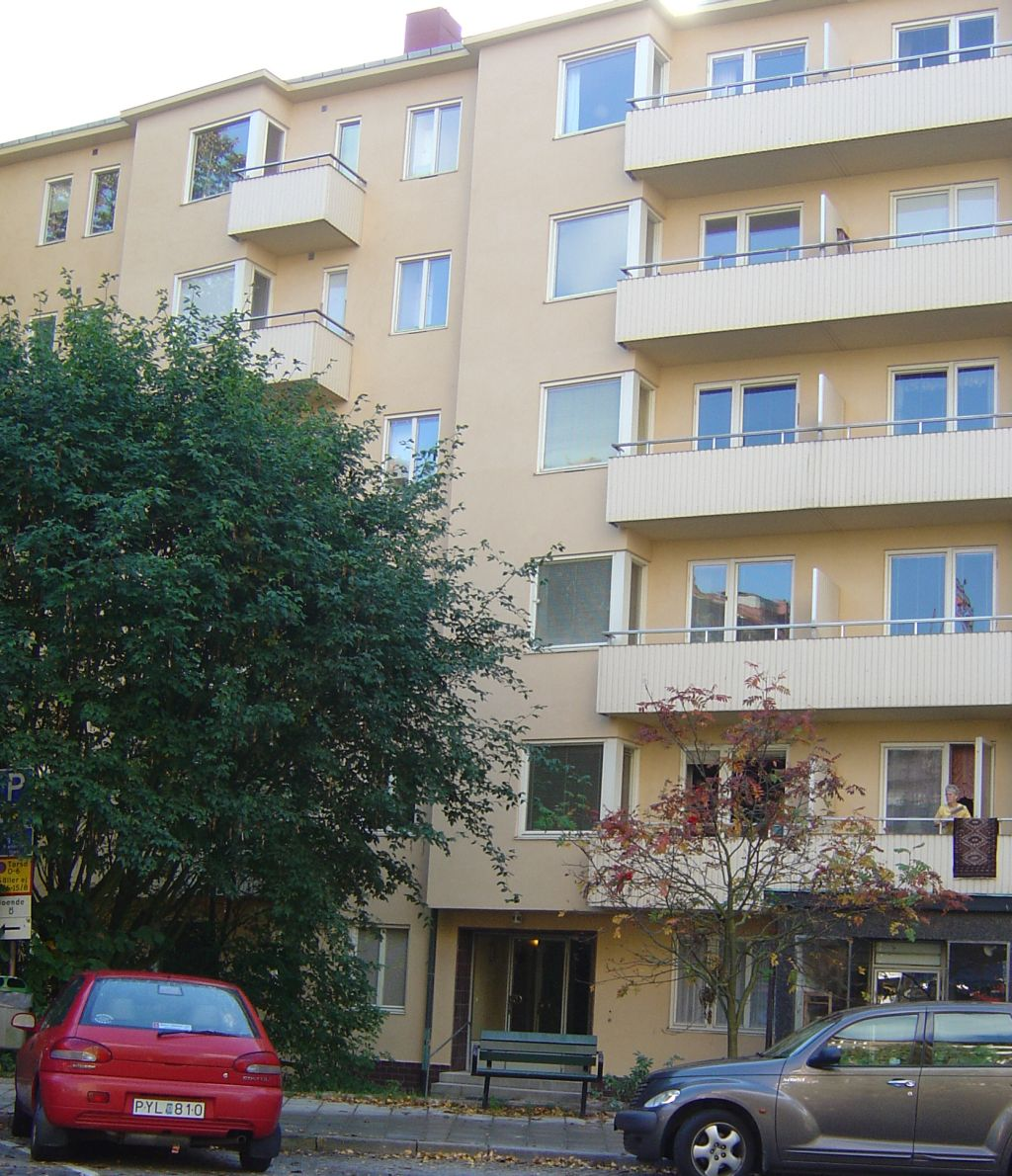
The house where Kai Holst was found dead at Rindögatan 42 in Gärdet in Stockholm

Göran Elgemyr has also long been interested in the fate of Norwegian resistance fighter Kai Holst, who was found dead in Stockholm in June 1945. Elgemyr made two radio programs about him for SR in 1992 that attracted great attention in both Sweden and Norway. In 2015, he published a book about the case, Kai Holsts mystiska död (The Mysterious Death of Kai Holst). Elgemyr based the book on his two radio programmes from 1992, but expanded with archival material and investigations into the background of the death. In June 2025, the Norwegian magazine Aftenposten Historie interviewed Elgemyr for a major article about the case, regarding the death that has engaged him for over 35 years. The article stated that Elgemyr, together with Professor Tore Pryser, Holst's niece Kari Heyerdahl-Larsen Høgset and Ulf Larsen, are working to have a public investigation into the death of Kai Holst.

=== Efforts for media history, especially radio ===
From 1980 to 1984, Elgemyr was a research assistant at the Department of History, Stockholm University. He was a board member of the Press History Society (formerly the Friends of the Press Archive) from 1983 to 2007, and was on the editorial board of the yearbook from 1983 to 1993. He has also written several articles for the yearbook.

Elgemyr has been researching the history of Sveriges Radio since 1974. At the time, this was largely a virgin field of research. He has disseminated his research in articles, books and series of radio programmes. Above all, he has focused on freedom of expression on the radio, especially the program sector "politics and society". He has also examined Swedish Radio’s relationship with the authorities, the Swedish Telegraph Board, the press and the Newspaper Telegram Agency (Tidningarnas Telegrambyrå]. He has also researched programme policy during the war years, and relations with the Nordic neighbouring countries of Finland, Denmark and Norway.

He was a board member of the interdisciplinary research foundation The Broadcast Media (Etermedierna) in Sweden and a member of its working committee and editorial committees from 1993 to 2014.

=== Various positions ===
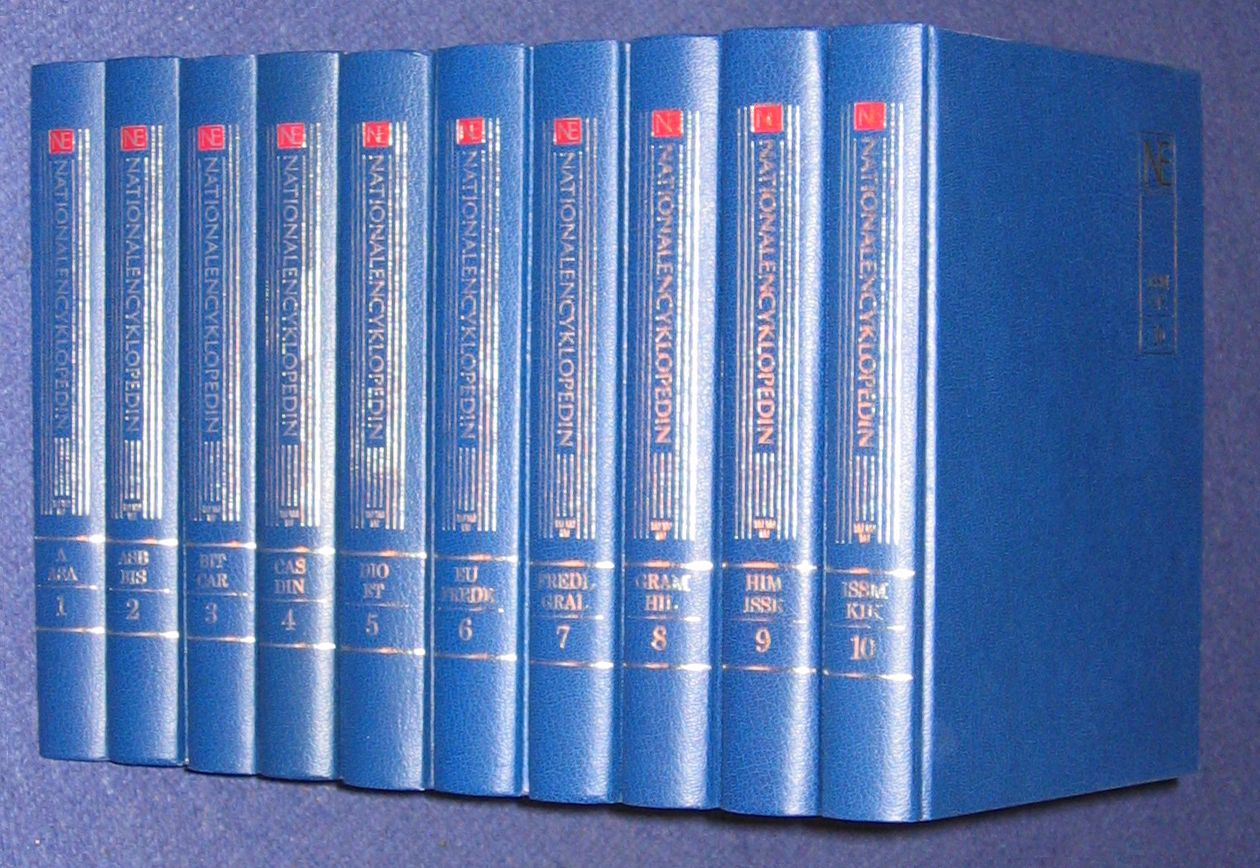
The Swedish National Encyclopaedia (Nationalencyklopedin), Volumes 1–10 of 20, 1989–1996

Elgemyr was a board member of the Democracy Institute in Sundsvall from 2001 and chairman from 2005 to 2008, as well as on the board of the affiliated research company Demicom. From 2016 to 2021, he was a board member of the Stockholm Journalists’ Seniors, and chairman from 2019 to 2021. Elgemyr has also been a contributor to the National Encyclopaedia (Nationalencyklopedin) and the Swedish Biographical Lexicon (Svenskt biografiskt lexicon) as an author of biographies of those active in broadcast media.

== Bibliography ==
=== Books and articles ===
- «Radiohistorisk forskning», in Antennen nr 1 (personaltidning för Sveriges Radio), 1975
- «De nordiska grannländerna i svensk radio 1939—1945», in Pressens årbog (Danmark), 1978
- «Radiotjänst och Vinterkriget», in del 1+2 in Nya Argus 3–4 and 5–6, 1980
- Operation Stella Polaris – Nordic Intelligence Cooperation in the Closing Stages of the Second World War, with Jörgen Cederberg, 1984
- Tala till och tala med. Perspektiv på den svenska radion och televisionen, with Jörgen Cederberg, Legenda, Stockholm 1984 ISBN 978-91-582-0613-7
- «För nordiska lyssnare. Radionyheter på danska, norska och finska i andra världskrigets slutskede», Presshistorisk årsbok, 1986
- «Maktkampen kring Dagens Eko – uppkomst och utveckling.», in Brunnberg og Elgemyr (red.) Dagens Eko. Nyheter i radio under 50 år., Stockholm: Sveriges Radios förlag, 1987
- «När Dagens Eko bröt vetorätten», in Brunnberg og Elgemyr (red.) Nyheter i radio under 50 år, 1987
- «Politruktjänsten som skakade radion», in Forskning om journalistik, Nordicom-Nytt/Sverige 4. 1988
- «Kontraspionen Otto Kumenius – en Münchhausen?», in Historielärarnas förenings årsskrift 1989/1990.
- Frihet under kontroll: Den svenska rundradiofrågan 1922–1924, Stiftelsen Etermedierna i Sverige, 1993
- «Radion i strama tyglar. Om Radiotjänsts tillblivelse, teknik och ekonomi 1922–1957», Stockholm: Stiftelsen Eftermedierna, 1996
- «Sweden and the Shoah: The Untold Chapters», Sven Fredrik Hedin and Göran Elgemyr. Policy Study no. 11. 1997. Institute of the World Jewish Congress, Jerusalem.
- «Sverige bytte järn mot stulet guld», with S.F. Hedin, Dagens Nyheter 21. januar 1997. Subsequent articles 22.1, 12.2, 21.10, 30.10, 29.8 1998, 13.11 and 11.12.
- «Schweden kaufte bis 1944 Gold von den Nazis», Frankfurter Allgemeine Zeitung 21 January 1997
- «Sverige og Schweiz i samme båt. Guldhandeln med nazisterne var lukrativ», the newspaper Politiken 25 January 1997
- «Stolen gods in the Central Bank: Sweden swapped iron for looted gold» (21 January 1997) and 22 January 1997: «Sweden and Switzerland lined their pockets». (in www.clintonlibrary.gov./..../6997222.gold-related.).
- «When Stockholm glittered with stolen diamonds. Swedish companies traded illegally with the Nazis», (in www.clintonlibrary.gov. /..../6997222.).
- Får jag be om en kommentar? : Yttrandefriheten i svensk radio 1925 1960, Norstedts, Stockholm, 2005 (nätversion från ur.se) ISBN 978-91-518-4325-4
- «Radiotjänst dilemma under den tyska ockupationen av Norge och Danmark», in Nordisk presse under andre verdskrigen, Pressehistorisk tidsskrift nr 13/2010
- «Inventiveness and a Desire to Experiment. The development of production technology in Swedish Radio 1925–1955». (in Djerf-Pierre&Ekström (eds) A History of Swedish Broadcasting. Communicative ethos, genres and institutional change, hange 2013
- «The Swedish Foundation of Broadcast Media History: An Overview», see previous book.
- Kai Holsts mystiska död : – Historien om en norsk motståndsman i Oslo och i Stockholm, Jure, Stockholm, 2015 ISBN 978-91-7223-615-8
- Vilhelm Moberg och radion. Dramatikern och den obekväme sanningssägaren, Carlsson Bokförlag 2017 ISBN 978-91-7331-853-2
- Sven Jerring i Amerika. Reportageresan i svenskbygderna 1937, Carlsson, Stockholm, 2025, ISBN 9189826540

=== Presshistorisk årsbok – from 2019 Mediehistorisk årsbok ===
- «”Skall rundradion få parasitera på pressen eller ej?”: relationerna mellan pressen, TT och ljudradion 1922–1970», 1984
- «”För nordiska lyssnare”: radionyheter på danska, norska och finska i andra världskrigets slutskede», 1986
- «En svensk journalistbragd under andra världskriget (Om Uddevalla-journalisten Per Perslows nyhetsförmedling om förhållandena i Norge)», with Jarl Torbacke and Elisabeth Sandlund, 1987
- «Radion och krigsutbrottet 1939», 1989
- «Tre krigskorrespondenter om Vinterkriget (Om Sven Aurén, Astrid Ljungström och Bernhard Valéry)», 1990
- «Tyska påtryckningar på Radiotjänst 1940», 1993
- «Presshistorisk årsbok: Ett 25-årsjubileum», 2008

=== Selected radio programs about Norway 1940–1945 ===
- «9 April 1940. När Danmark och Norge togs på sängen. Om dagarna före och efter den tyska invasionen av Danmark och Norge berättar Göran Elgemyr.», 1-2- 1980.
- «Frihetens stämma i Norden». Göran Elgemyr berättar om hur lyssnarna i de krigshärjade grannländerna fick ett eget nyhetsprogram i svensk radio.» 1984
- «Ett missnöjt broderfolk. Om norska misstämningar mot Sverige under och efter andra världskriget berättar Göran Elgemyr.» 1–2. 1985.
- «Svarta fåglar över Norden. Temakväll om 50-årsminnet av Nazi-Tysklands ockupation av Danmark och Norge. Temakväll.» 1990.
- «På hemligt uppdrag i Stockholm. Peter Tennant, brittisk pressattaché i Stockholm under andra världskriget berättar för Göran Elgemyr om de händelserika åren». 1–2. SR P1 9.6. and 16.6. 1990.
- «Norska radioagenter i tjänst hos Secret Service.» 1–2. 1991.
- «Motstånd i det fördolda. Om norska XU-agenternas spionage i det tyskockuperade Norge.» 1-2- 1991.
- «Lillehammer-Stockholm. I kölvattnet av den tyska kapitulationen.» SR P1 17.4. and 20.4. 1992.:
  - 1. «Den mystiska kofferten.»
  - 2. «Liket på Gärdet.»
- «Röhsska museet i Göteborg: täckmantel för samarbete med norska motståndsmän 1940–1945». 1–2. SR P1 20.5. and 31 May 1993.

=== Other radio programs in selection ===
- «Jag vill vara neutral, säger radion. Om synen på politiken i radio berättar Jörgen Cederberg och Göran Elgemyr.» 1–3. 9.9, 13.9 and 16.9 1976.
- «Högt spel i Norden. Maktspel kring den sekretessbelagda Stella Polarisaffären.» 1–2. (with Jörgen Cederberg and Jan Bergquist). 27.3 and 3.4 1977.
- «Spioner i etern. Om finländsk och svensk radiospaning under andra världskriget.» 1–2. (with Jörgen Cederberg). 23.8 and 25.8 1977.
- «Ljuva 60-tal. Tittarstormar vridningar och skjutjärn. Jörgen Cederberg och Göran Elgemyr granskar det politiska stoffet och samhällsbevakningen i radio och TV under 1960-talet.» 1–4. 24.2, 3.3, 13.3 and 17.3 1978.
- «Uppdrag utan gränser. Intervju med kontraspionen Otto Kumenius, verksam inom den finländska, svenska, tyska och japanska spionaget under andra världskriget.» 1–3. (with Jörgen Cederberg). 8.4, 15.4 and 16.4 1979.
- «Fred till varje pris. Om arbetarfredskongressen och den efterföljande förräderiprocessen 1916 mot Zeth Höglund, Erik Hedén och Ivan Oljelund.» 1–2. 28.9 and 5.10 1979.
- «Cell 232 Långholmen. Ivan Oljelunds fängelsetid 1916–1917.» 12.10 1979.
- «Vårt blödande broderfolk. Vinterkriget mellan Finland och Sovjet 1939–1940.» 1–4. 25.11, 2.12, 8.12 1979 and 7.1 1980.
- «Rapsodi-reportage-dokumentär. Verklighetsskildringen i svensk radio i ett historiskt perspektiv. Jörgen Cederberg och Göran Elgemyr lyssnar på stilarter och röster från radions första tre decennier.» 1–2. 7.7 and 14.7 1985.
- «Med vapen, sprängmedel och flyktingar i lasten. Arne Elström med täcknamn "Nybo" berättar för Göran Elgemyr om krigsårens illegala trafik mellan Jylland och Göteborg.» 22.6 1986.
- «Waldheims förlorade heder.» 27.9 1987.
- «Författarinnan Amelie Posse – orädd och obekväm sanningssägare.» 1–2. 24.12 1992 and 1.1 1993.
- «Sveriges Radio 75 år. Hur radion bildat, fostrat, roat och oroat genom decennierna berättar Göran Elgemyr.» 23.9 2000.
