= Asvor Ottesen =

Norwegian WWII resistance member and lawyer

Asvor Ottesen (12 January 1911 Hamburg – 9 June 2003) was a Norwegian saboteur in the resistance during WWII and then after the war a lawyer, active in the Communist Party of Norway.

On 19 August 1941 Ottesen and Aksel Engelsgaard tried to blow up the restaurant "Löwenbräu" ("Humla") in Universitetsgata 26 in Oslo which was then frequented by German officers. The IED was discovered before it went off.

In 1948, Ottesen started her own law practice.
