= Knut Einar Eriksen =

Norwegian historian

Knut Einar Eriksen (born 31 July 1944) is a Norwegian historian.

He was born in Sarpsborg, and took the cand.philol. degree in 1969. He was an associate professor at the University of Tromsø from 1975 to 1982, and a professor from 1982 to 1986. In 1989 he was appointed as a professor at the University of Oslo. He is a member of the Norwegian Academy of Science and Letters, and from 1988 to 1990 he chaired the Norwegian Historical Association.

Among his most important publications is DNA og NATO. Striden om norsk NATO-medlemskap innen regjeringspartiet 1948–49, which was released in 1972 and explores objections to NATO membership within the Norwegian Labour Party (DNA). In 1987 he wrote Frigjøring, volume eight of the World War II work Norge i krig, with Terje Halvorsen. In 1998 he released a two-volume history on surveillance in Norway, Den hemmelige krigen: overvåking i Norge 1914–1997, together with Trond Bergh.

With the publication of the latter work he became involved in an unusual case. Former secretary of the Standing Committee on Finance and Economic Affairs Haakon Bingen sued Eriksen and Bergh as well as the publishing house Cappelen Akademisk Forlag, because the second volume of Den hemmelige krigen contained information that portrayed Bingen as a close friend of communist Peder Furubotn. In late 1999 the Supreme Court of Norway found that this was not true, and circulation of the book was forbidden, until the reference to Bingen had been amended. Bingen was also awarded 146,975 kr in costs.
