= Lars Borgersrud =

Norwegian historian (born 1949)

Lars Borgersrud (born 11 March 1949) is a Norwegian military historian and government scholar. His work has largely centered on World War II in Norway.

Borgersrud formed close relations with leading figures of the Norwegian Maoist movement beginning in the late 1960s.

== Career ==
Borgersrud's master's thesis from 1975 disclosed sensitive information regarding military personnel and organization prior to World War II and their possible effects on military preparedness prior to the invasion of Norway by Nazi Germany. As a student he was threatened with being prosecuted if he published his thesis. Nevertheless, Borgersrud eventually published three books with material from his work under the pseudonym "Ottar Strømme": Stille mobilisering, Unngå å irritere fienden and Den hemmelige hæren. In 1978, he also published the first volume of the secret report from Den militære undersøkelseskommisjonen av 1946, under the same pseudonym.

He was a contributor to the 1995 World War II encyclopedia Norsk krigsleksikon 1940-1945.

=== Research ===
His 1995 doctoral dissertation examined the Wollweber organization in Norway.

In the 2000s, he also participated in research on the fate of war children—children born during the German occupation of Norway who had German fathers and Norwegian mothers.

=== Denied access to governmental archive ===
While preparing the book Konspirasjon og kapitulasjon (2000), Borgersrud tried to survey Norwegian military officers with Nazi sympathies but met resistance and was denied access to historical documents from the National Archival Services of Norway.

== Family ==
He was until 1982 married to professor and feminism activist Leikny Øgrim, daughter of XU member and physicist Otto Øgrim and sister of SUF(m-l) and AKP(m-l) ideologist Tron Øgrim. He is the father of rappers Elling and Aslak from Gatas Parlament.

== Selected works ==
- Nye momenter til forståelse av norsk krigshistorie. Trekk ved den militærpolitiske utviklinga i Norge 1918-40, og begrensninger de la på den norske krigføringa i 1940. 1975.
- Strømme, Ottar (pseudonym) (1977). "Stille mobilisering". Hvorfor det ble stille og delvis mobilisering 9. april 1940 og hvorfor soldatene fikk ubrukelige våpen.
- Strømme, Ottar (pseudonym) (1978). Den hemmelige hæren.
- Strømme, Ottar (pseudonym) (1981). "Unngå å irritere fienden". Krigen i Norge 1940 – eventyr og virkelighet.
- Wollweber-organisasjonen i Norge. 1995.
- Årstall og holdepunkter i norgeshistorien. 1999.
- Konspirasjon og kapitulasjon. Nytt lys på forsvarshistorien fra 1814 til 1940. Oslo: Oktober. 2000.
- Fiendebilde Wollweber. Svart propaganda i kald krig. 2001.
- Overlatt til svenske myndigheter. De norske krigsbarna som ble sendt til Sverige i 1945. Institutt for Kulturstudier, Universitetet i Oslo. 2002.
- Staten og krigsbarna. 2004.
