= 1993 in Norway =

- Centuries: 18th; 19th; 20th; 21st
- Decades: 1970s; 1980s; 1990s; 2000s; 2010s
- See also: List of years in Norway

Events in the year 1993 in Norway.

== Incumbents ==
- Monarch – Harald V.
- President of the Storting – Kirsti Kolle Grøndahl (Labour Party)
- Prime Minister – Gro Harlem Brundtland (Labour Party)

== Events ==
- 30 April – The registered partnership civil union law is passed.
- 1 August – The registered partnership civil union law comes into effect, granting same-sex couples the same rights as married couples, except for the right to adopt or marry in a church.
- 6 August – Kim Friele and Wenche Lowzow commit to the first civil union partnership under the new law.
- 10 August – Black metal musician Varg Vikernes murders Øystein "Euronymous" Aarseth, another black metal musician. Vikernes gets sentenced to 21 years in prison (maximum sentence under Norwegian law).
- 20 August – Negotiations concerning agreements between the government of Israel and the Palestine Liberation Organization (PLO) are conducted secretly in Oslo and eventually conclude with the signing of the first agreement in the Oslo Accords between by Foreign Minister Shimon Peres for Israel, Mahmoud Abbas for the PLO and Secretary of State Warren Christopher for the United States.
- 13 September – The 1993 Parliamentary election takes place. The Labour Party wins a plurality of seats, and Prime Minister Gro Harlem Brundtland remains in office.
- 11 October – The Norwegian publisher William Nygaard is shot three times outside his home in Dagaliveien in Oslo. Suspects of the assassination attempt are Islamists who reacted to Nygaard publishing the Norwegian edition of Salman Rushdie's novel The Satanic Verses.
- 27 October – Widerøe Flight 744, a De Havilland Canada DHC-6 Twin Otter, crashes in Overhalla Municipality on approach to Namsos Airport, killing both pilots and four passengers; the crash is also known as the Namsos Accident.
- 10 December – Drammen Theatre is completely destroyed by fire.
- Alta Museum receives the European Museum of the Year Award.

=== Sports ===
- 28 February – The FIS Nordic World Ski Championships 1993 concludes, with Norway winning the most gold medals and the most overall medals.
- 7–11 March – The Norway national under-20 football team participates in the 1993 FIFA World Youth Championship; the second time after participating in 1989, but the last appearance until 2019.
- 10–13 March – The Norway men's national handball team participates in the 1993 World Men's Handball Championship, for the first time since 1970.
- 2 June – The Norway national football team beats England, solidifying Norway's chances of winning the 1994 FIFA World Cup qualification – UEFA Group 2.
- 9 June – The Norway national football team draws with the Netherlands, further solidifying Norway's chances of winning the 1994 FIFA World Cup qualification – UEFA Group 2.
- 4 July – The Norway women's national football team beats Italy and wins the UEFA Women's Euro 1993 final.
- 17–29 August – the 1993 UCI Track Cycling World Championships are held at Vikingskipet in the town of Hamar.
- 28–29 August – the 1993 UCI Road World Championships are held in Oslo.
- 29 September – Lillestrøm SK beats Torino FC in the 1993–94 European Cup Winners' Cup, although Torino wins over two rounds on aggregate.
- 13 October – The Norway national football team beats Poland, securing victory in the 1994 FIFA World Cup qualification – UEFA Group 2 and Norway's participation in the 1994 FIFA World Cup.
- 20 October – Kongsvinger IL draws with Juventus FC in the 1993–94 UEFA Cup, although Juventus wins over two rounds on aggregate.
- 24 November–5 December 1993 – The 1993 World Women's Handball Championship is held in six Norwegian cities. The Norway women's national handball team win bronze medals.

=== Anniversaries ===
- 15 June – 150 years since the birth of Edvard Grieg.

== Notable births ==
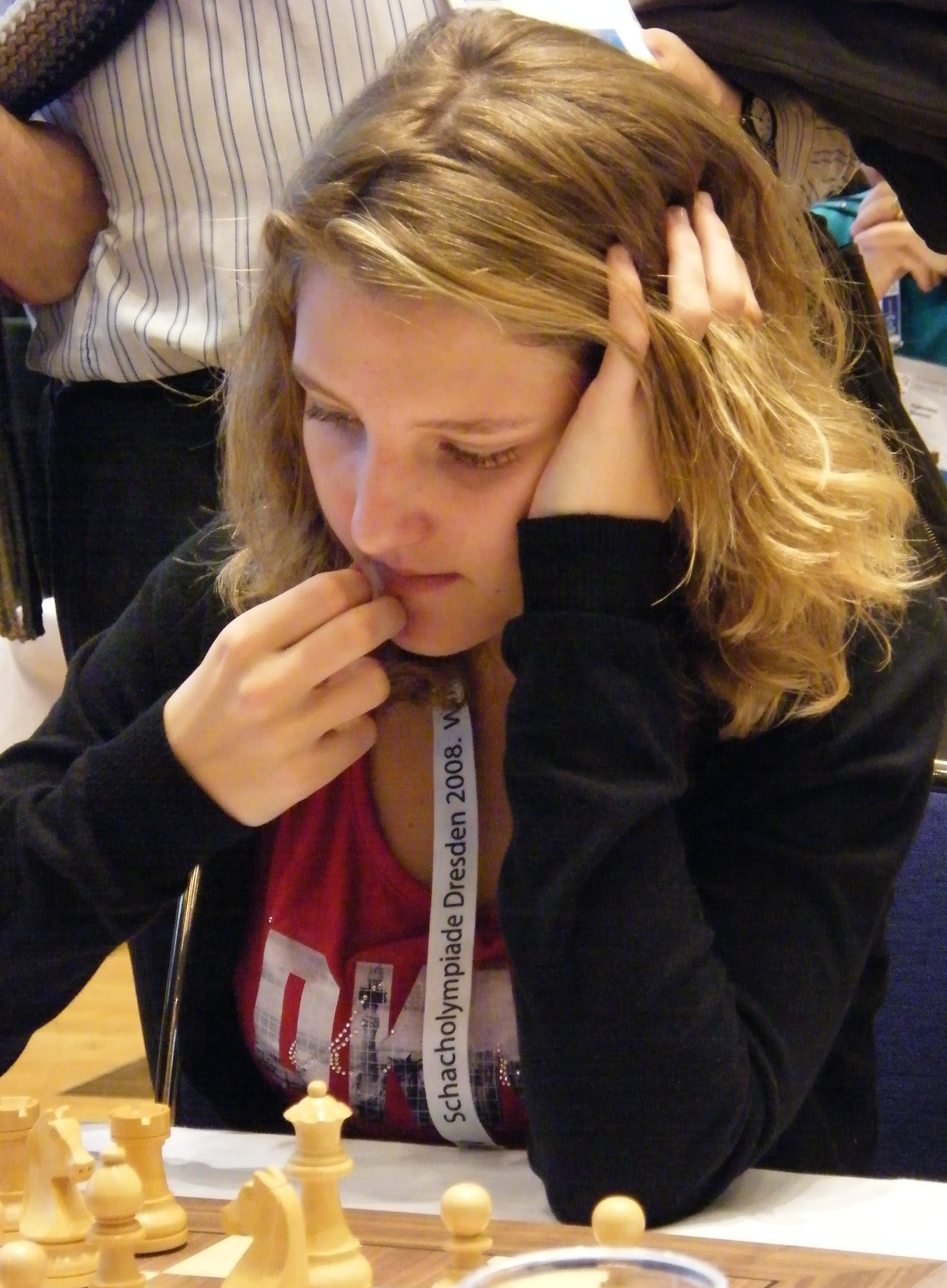
Katrine Tjølsen

- 6 January – Malin Falch, cartoonist.
- 14 January – Gyda Enger, ski jumper.
- 18 January – Nicolai Næss, footballer.
- 8 February – Gustav Magnar Witzøe, businessman
- 17 February – Emil Jonassen, footballer.
- 11 March – Marius Lode, footballer.
- 13 March – Simen Hegstad Krüger, cross-country skier.
- 20 March – Prableen Kaur, politician.
- 4 April – Daniel Berntsen, footballer.
- 12 April – Andreas "Tix" Haukeland, musician and producer.
- 20 April – Celine Sivertsen, handballer.
- 26 April – Tiril Bue, yacht racer.
- 4 May – Eivind Tangen, handball player.
- 4 May – Chris Holsten, singer.
- 4 May – Sander Skogli, ice hockey player.
- 18 May – Thomas Valkvæ Olsen, ice hockey player.
- 18 May – Fredrik Oldrup Jensen, footballer.
- 26 May – Gustav Valsvik, footballer.
- 30 May – Sean McDermott, footballer.
- 1 June – Jenny Langlo, singer.
- 3 June – Ståle Sandbech, snowboarder.
- 5 June – Maria Thorisdottir, footballer.
- 6 June – Andrine Hegerberg, footballer.
- 8 June – Kristine Nøstmo, footballer.
- 22 June – Heidi "Kamferdrops" Musum, singer.
- 15 July – Håvard Nielsen, footballer.
- 19 July – Henrik Gjesdal, footballer.
- 6 August – Steffen Søberg, ice hockey player.
- 8 August – Emilie Enger Mehl, politician.
- 9 August – Madelen Haug Hansen, ice hockey player.
- 10 August – Sondre Turvoll Fossli, cross-country skier.
- 11 August – Fredrik Midtsjø, footballer.
- 19 August – Kristoffer Barmen, footballer.
- 28 August – Oliver Berg, footballer.
- 31 August – Hege Løken, handballer.
- 31 August – Tina Røe Skaar, taekwondo practitioner.
- 2 September – Vegard Bjerkreim Nilsen, cross-country skier.
- 29 September – Maren Skjøld, alpine skier.
- 3 October – Eirik Wollen Steen, footballer.
- 28 October – Espen Andersen, Nordic combined skier.
- 8 November – Mathias Trettenes, ice hockey player.
- 5 December – Andreas Heier, ice hockey player.
- 17 December – Sondre Holst Enger, cyclist.

Full date unknown

- Rohey Taalah, singer
- Annie Winquist, alpine skier

=== Full date missing ===
- Katrine Tjølsen, chess player.

== Notable deaths ==
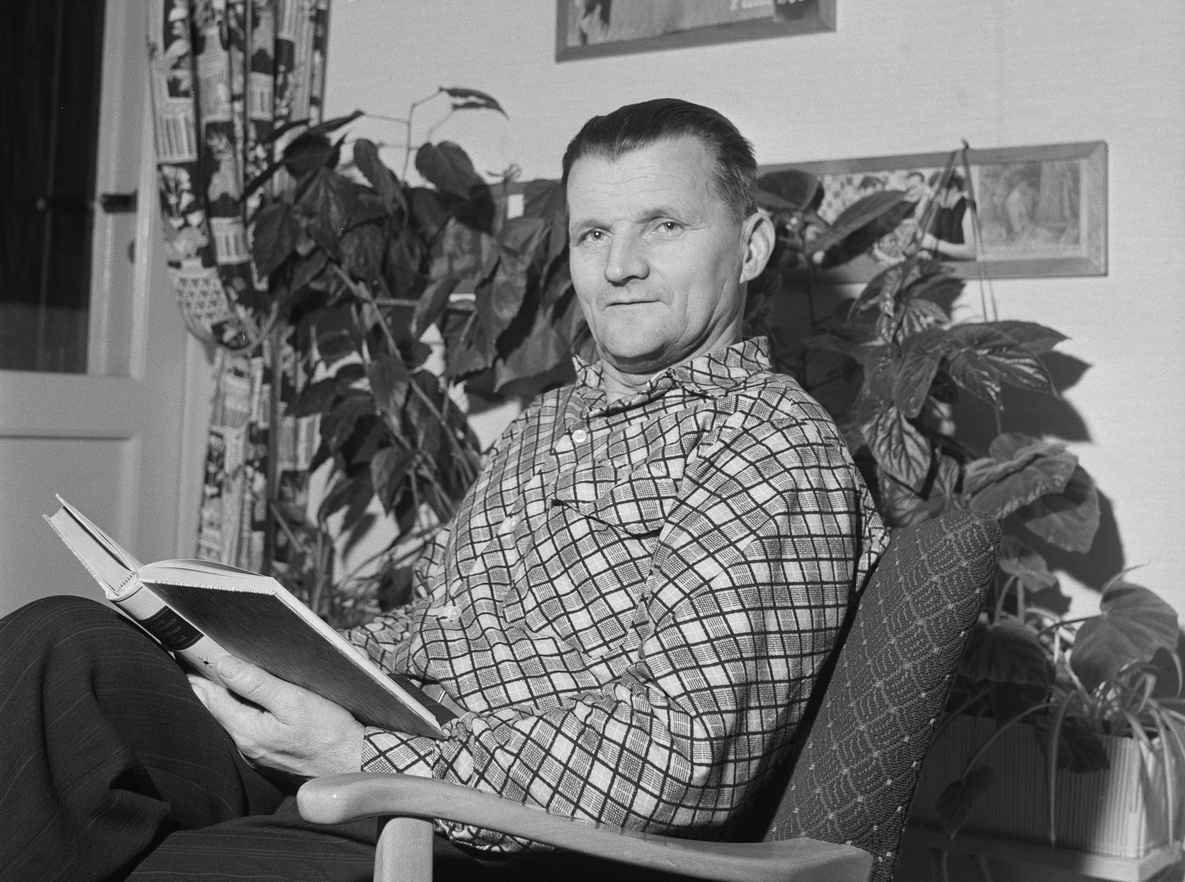
Osvald Harjo

- 12 January – Margit Tøsdal, politician (born 1918).
- 22 January – Knut Isachsen, politician (born 1906).
- 25 January – Nils Kristen Jacobsen, politician (born 1908)
- 28 January – Erik Herseth, yacht racer and opera singer (born 1892).
- 31 January – Frithjof Ulleberg, footballer (born 1911).
- 7 February – Erling Dekke Næss, shipowner and businessman (born 1901).
- 11 February – Tove Stang Dahl, legal scholar (born 1938).
- 15 February – Eva Bull Holte, painter and printmaker (born 1922).
- 23 February – Walter Fyrst, film director (born 1901).
- 25 February – Sonja Mjøen, actress (born 1898).
- 27 February – Johan Hambro, journalist (born 1915).
- 28 February – Marie Foss, conductor (born 1907).
- 5 March – Egil Borgen Johansen, archer (born 1934).
- 9 March – Norveig Karlsen, gymnast (born 1922).
- 9 March – Knut Brinchmann-Hansen, politician (born 1911).
- 12 March – Gunnar Haukebø, painter (born 1909).
- 16 March – Asbjørn Andersen, politician (born 1941).
- 17 March – Thorstein Treholt, politician (born 1911).
- 17 March – Eilif Dahl, botanist (born 1916).
- 18 March – Arne Durban, sculptor (born 1912).
- 19 March – Bjarne Holst, painter (born 1944).
- 22 March – Yngvar Hagen, zoologist (born 1909).
- 28 March – Per Sonerud, politician (born 1915).
- 31 March – Jens Christian Mellbye, legal scholar (born 1914).
- 1 April – Kristian Bjørn, cross-country skier (born 1919).
- 4 April – Terje Rollem, resistance member (born 1915).
- 8 April – Ingeborg Hoff, philologist (born 1911).
- 17 April – Torstein Eckhoff, civil servant and legal scholar (born 1916, died in Denmark).
- 19 April – Erling Hauger, author (born 1899).
- 19 April – Kristian Kristiansen, physician (born 1907).
- 20 April – Osvald Harjo, resistance member (born 1910).
- 1 May – Odd Frithjof Fladstad, politician (born 1907).
- 3 May – Bjørn Rørholt, engineer, military officer and resistance member (born 1919).
- 3 May – Per Mellesmo, politician (born 1919).
- 4 May – Knut Skinnarland, sculptor (born 1909).
- 11 May – Magli Elster, lyricist (born 1912).
- 19 May – Brynjulf Bull, barrister and politician (born 1906).
- 21 May – Hans Gaare, politician (born 1942).
- 7 June – Nils Johan Rud, writer and editor (born 1908).
- 16 June – Sverre Holth, theologian (born 1902).
- 17 June – Moy Herborg Regina Nordahl, politician (born 1907).
- 19 June – Liv Marit Tokle, politician (born 1942).
- 21 June – Doro Ording, painter (born 1922).
- 24 June – Odd Sagør, politician (born 1918).
- 30 June – Iver Johan Unsgård, politician (born 1903).
- 2 July – Hans Andreas Ihlebæk, journalist (born 1930).
- 5 July – Ola Mørk Sandvik, architect (born 1911).
- 7 July – Ove Arbo Høeg, botanist (born 1898).
- 18 July – Kristoffer Rein, politician (born 1912).
- 22 July – Ivar Stokke, wrestler (born 1911).
- 24 July – Erik Langdalen, architect (born 1925).
- 30 July – Sigmund Søfteland, speed skater (born 1923).
- 30 July – Jostein Nyhamar, editor (born 1922).
- 1 August – Oskar Mendelsohn, writer (born 1912).
- 10 August – Øystein "Euronymous" Aarseth, guitarist and record label owner (born 1968).
- 13 August – Gunnar Lunde, writer (born 1944).
- 15 August – Hans Nordahl, footballer (born 1918).
- 21 August – Thor Fossum, politician (born 1916).
- 2 September – Ingvar Moe, writer (born 1936).
- 3 September – Henrik Selberg, mathematician (born 1906).
- 8 September – Tor Skjønsberg, resistance leader and businessperson (born 1903).
- 12 September – Gunvor Smolan, politician (born 1926).
- 14 September – Erling Asbjørn Kongshaug, rifle shooter (born 1915).
- 16 September – Torkel Opsahl, legal scholar (born 1931, died in Switzerland).
- 21 September – Sverre Johannessen, alpine skier (born 1921).
- 25 September – Else Christie Kielland, painter and art historian (born 1903).
- 27 September – Olav T. Halle, politician (born 1913).
- 14 October – Harald Hennum, footballer (born 1928).
- 19 October – Gidske Anderson, writer (born 1921).
- 1 November – Marius Sandvei, philologist (born 1905).
- 6 November – Willy Johansson, glass designer (born 1921).
- 7 November – Gunnar Bull Gundersen, writer (born 1929).
- 9 November – Per Tønseth, judge (born 1914).
- 12 November – Gunvor Snekvik Knaben, botanist (born 1911).
- 18 November – Arvid Fladmoe, composer and conductor (born 1915).
- 27 November – Einar Landvik, ceoss-country skier (born 1898).
- 28 November – Johan Vestly, illustrator (born 1923).
- 28 November – Eilif Armand, actor (born 1921).
- 29 November – Karsten Buer, harness racer (born 1913).
- 2 December – Paal Brekke, writer (born 1923).
- 6 December – Jørgen Mathiesen, landowner and businessperson (born 1901).
- 6 December – Hans Jacob Meyer, sculptor and ship-owner (born 1907).
- 7 December – Hakon Solem, yacht racer (born 1908).
- 19 December – Aagot Børseth, actress (born 1898).
- 19 December – Julius Hougen, radio presenter (born 1906).
- 19 December – Bjørn-Willy Mortensen, printmaker (born 1941).
- 22 December – Inga Tamnes, alleged psychic (born 1923).
- 23 December – Øyvind Øyen, actor (born 1905).
- 24 December – Kaare Halvorsen, painter (born 1926).
- 24 December – Jakob Sigurd Holmgard, politician (born 1929).
- 26 December – Simen Skjønsberg, journalist and writer (born 1920).
- 27 December – Cissi Cleve, opera singer and composer (born 1911).
- 31 December – Inger Margrethe Gaarder, children's writer (born 1926).

Full date missing

- Olav Torpp, traffic engineer and civil servant (born 1907)
- Sigurd Senje
