= Jostein =

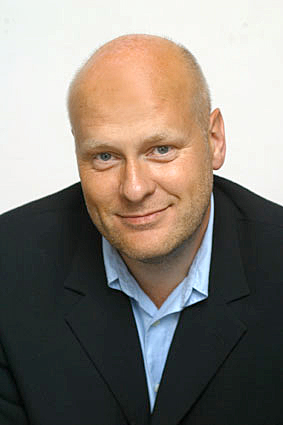
Jostein Pedersen

- Jostein Helge Bernhardsen (born 1945), Norwegian diplomat
- Jostein Berntsen (born 1943), Norwegian politician for the Labour Party
- Jostein Erstad (1922–2011), Norwegian jurist
- Dag Jostein Fjærvoll (born 1947), Norwegian politician for the Christian People's Party
- Jostein Flo (born 1964), Norwegian former football player
- Jostein Gaarder (born 1952), Norwegian intellectual, author of several novels, short stories and children's books
- Jostein Goksøyr (1922–2000), Norwegian microbiologist
- Jostein Grindhaug (born 1973), Norwegian football coach and former player
- Jostein Gundersen (born 1996), Norwegian footballer
- Jostein Hasselgård (born 1979), the winner of Norway's national pre-selection for the Eurovision Song Contest 2003
- Arne Jostein Ingebrethsen (1903–1945), Norwegian newspaper editor killed during the occupation of Norway by Nazi Germany
- Jostein Løfsgaard (1923–2011), Norwegian academic executive
- Jostein Nerbøvik (1938–2004), Norwegian historian
- Jostein Nyhamar (1922–1993), Norwegian magazine editor, biographer and politician for the Labour Party
- Jostein Pedersen (born 1959), Norwegian musical journalist and reporter, television commentator and "music intelligencia"
- Jostein Rise (born 1945), Norwegian social psychologist
- Kåre Jostein Simonsen (born 1948), Norwegian bandoneonist
- Jostein Stige (born 1954), Norwegian sprint canoeist who competed in the mid 1970s
- Jostein Wilmann (born 1953), former Norwegian professional road racing cyclist
