= Holth =

Holth is a surname. Notable people with the surname include:

- Åsta Holth (1904–1999), Norwegian novelist, poet and short story writer
- Camilla Holth (born 1978), Norwegian curler
- Halfdan Holth (1880–1950), Norwegian veterinarian
- Marie Spångberg Holth (1865–1942), Norwegian physician
- Sverre Holth (1902–1993), Norwegian missionary in China
- Thorleif Holth (1931–2014), Norwegian politician
- Even Holth (2000-), Norwegian Musician
