= Elizabeth Alexander =

Elizabeth Alexander may refer to:

- Elizabeth Alexander (actress) (born 1952), Australian actress
- Elizabeth Alexander (scientist) (1908–1958), British-born geologist, physicist, and radio astronomer
- Elizabeth Alexander (businesswoman) (born 1943), chancellor of the University of Melbourne
- Elizabeth Alexander (composer) (born 1962), American composer
- Elizabeth Alexander (poet) (born 1962), American poet, essayist, playwright and professor
- Elizabeth Alexander (press secretary), press secretary for U.S. Vice President Joe Biden from 2009 to 2011
