= Yehuda Amichai =

Israeli poet and author (1924–2000)

- יְהוּדָה עַמִּיחַי
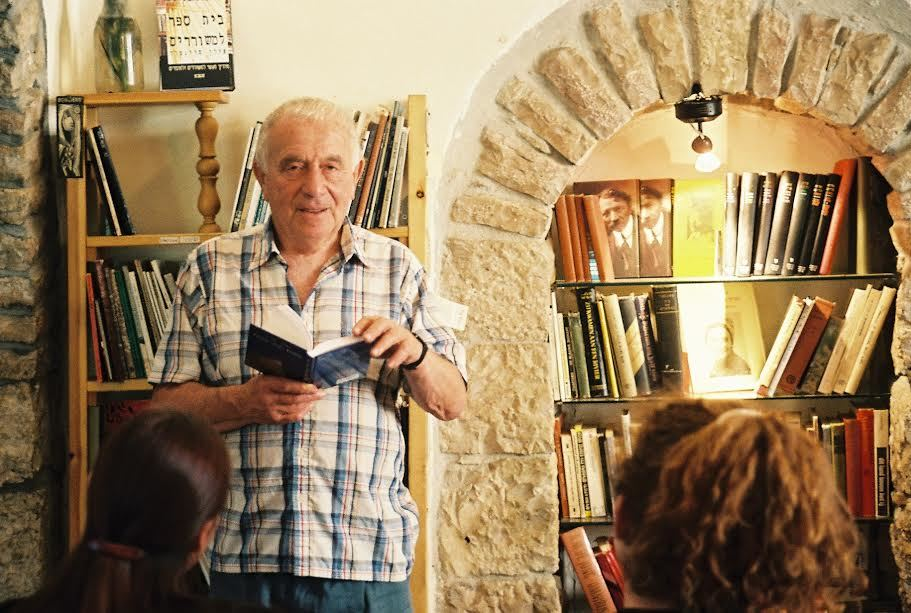
- Born: Ludwig Pfeuffer; 3 May 1924; Würzburg, Germany
- Died: 22 September 2000 (aged 76); Jerusalem, Israel
- Citizenship: Israeli
- Writing career
- Language: Hebrew
- Genre: Poetry
- Notable awards: 1957 Shlonsky Prize, 1969 Brenner Prize, 1976 Bialik Prize, and 1982 Israel Prize

Yehuda Amichai (Hebrew: יְהוּדָה עַמִּיחַי; born Ludwig Pfeuffer; 3 May 1924 – 22 September 2000) was an Israeli poet and author, one of the first to write in colloquial Hebrew in modern times. His 17 books have been translated into more than 20 languages, including Chinese and Japanese. He was a people's poet who believed that his poetry should reflect ordinary life. As he once said, "I am also living among the dead." He changed his last name to "Amichai", meaning "My nation lives".

Amichai was awarded the 1957 Shlonsky Prize, the 1969 Brenner Prize, 1976 Bialik Prize, and 1982 Israel Prize. He also won international poetry prizes, and was nominated several times for the Nobel Prize in Literature.

== Biography ==
Yehuda Amichai was born in Würzburg, Germany, to an Orthodox Jewish family, and was raised speaking both Hebrew and German. His German name was Ludwig Pfeuffer.

Amichai immigrated with his family at the age of eleven to Petah Tikva in Mandate Palestine in 1935, moving to Jerusalem in 1936. He attended Ma'aleh, a religious high school in Jerusalem. He was a member of the Palmach, the strike force of the Haganah, the defense force of the Jewish community in Mandatory Palestine. As a young man he volunteered and fought in World War II as a soldier in the British Army, serving in the Jewish Brigade. During the 1948 Arab–Israeli War he served in the Israel Defense Forces on the southern front in the Negev.

After discharge from the British Army in 1946, Amichai was a student at David Yellin College of Education in Jerusalem, and became a teacher in Haifa. After the 1948 Arab–Israeli War, Amichai studied the Torah and Hebrew literature at the Hebrew University of Jerusalem. Encouraged by one of his professors at Hebrew University, he published his first book of poetry, Now and in Other Days, in 1955.

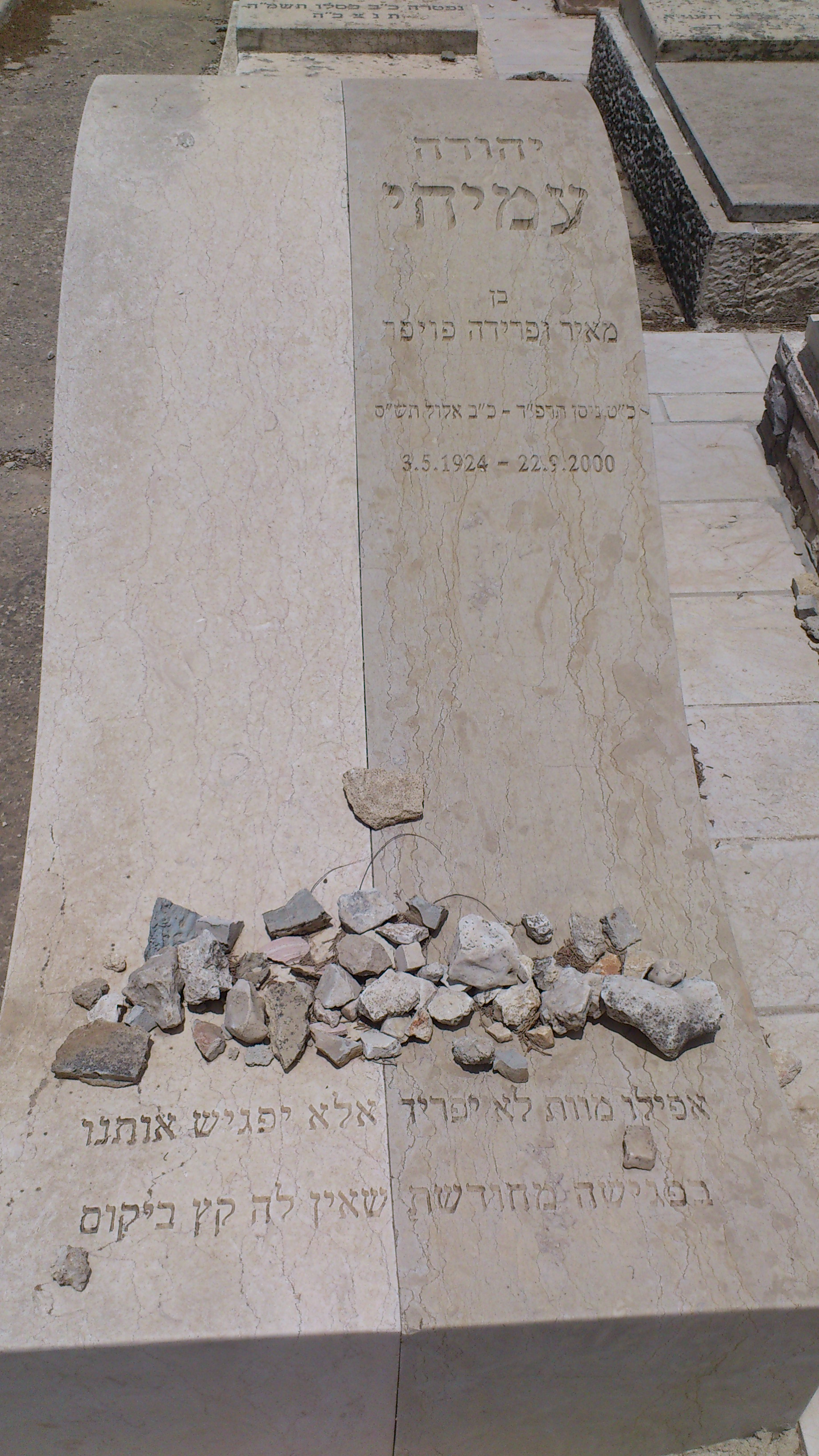
Tomb of Yehuda Amichai

In 1956, Amichai served in the Sinai War, and in 1973 he served in the Yom Kippur War. Amichai published his first novel, Not of This Time, Not of This Place, in 1963. It is about a young Israeli who was born in Germany; after World War II, and the 1947–1949 Palestine war, he visits his hometown in Germany and recalls his childhood, trying to make sense of the world that created the Holocaust. His second novel, Mi Yitneni Malon, about an Israeli poet living in New York, was published in 1971 while Amichai was a visiting professor at the University of California, Berkeley. He was a poet in residence at New York University in 1987. For many years he taught literature in an Israeli seminar for teachers, and at the Hebrew University to students from abroad.

Amichai was invited in 1994 by Prime Minister Yitzhak Rabin to read from his poems at the ceremony of the Nobel Peace Prize in Oslo. "God Has Pity on Kindergarten Children" was one of the poems he read. This poem is inscribed on a wall in the Yitzhak Rabin Center in Tel Aviv. There are streets named after him in cities in Israel, and also one in Würzburg.

Amichai was married twice. He was first married to Tamar Horn, with whom he had one son, and then to Chana Sokolov; they had one son and one daughter. His two sons were Ron and David, and his daughter was Emmanuella.

Amichai died of cancer in 2000, at age 76.

== Poetry ==
A Hebrew poetry reading in the 1950s. Seated from left to right: Nathan Zach, Yehuda Amichai, and David Avidan.

Amichai's poetry deals with issues of day-to-day life, and with philosophical issues of the meaning of life and death. Amichai’s approach consistently prioritizes the living person over the dead symbol, and the human experience over the mythical. His work is characterized by gentle irony and original, often surprising imagery. Like many secular Israeli poets, he struggles with religious faith. His poems are full of references to God and the religious experience. He was described as a philosopher-poet in search of a post-theological humanism.

Amichai has been credited with a "rare ability for transforming the personal, even private, love situation, with all its joys and agonies, into everybody's experience, making his own time and place general."

Some of his imagery was accused of being sacrilegious. In his poem "And this is Your Glory" (Vehi Tehilatekha), for example, God is sprawled under the globe like a mechanic under a car, futilely trying to repair it. In the poem "Gods Change, Prayers Stay the Same" (Elim Mithalfim, ha-Tfillot Nisharot la-Ad), God is a portrayed as a tour guide or magician.

Many of Amichai's poems were set to music in Israel and in other countries. Among them: the poem Memorial Day for the War Dead was set to music for solo voices, chorus and orchestra in Mohammed Fairouz's Third Symphony. Other poems were set by the composers Elizabeth Alexander ("Even a fist was once an open palm and fingers"), David Froom, Matthias Pintscher, Jan Dušek, Benjamin Wallfisch, Ayelet Rose Gottlieb, Maya Beiser, Elizabeth Swados, Daniel Asia and others.

== Language and poetic style ==
In an interview published in the American Poetry Review, Amichai spoke about his command of Hebrew:

I grew up in a very religious household ... So the prayers, the language of prayer itself became a kind of natural language for me ... I don't try—like sometimes poets do—to 'enrich' poetry by getting more cultural material or more ethnic material into it. It comes very naturally.

Robert Alter describes Amichai's poetry as a "play of sound". He "builds a strong momentum that moves in free association from word to word, the sounds virtually generating the words that follow in the syntactic chain through phonetic kinship".

Amichai's work was popular in English translation, but admirers of his poetry in the original Hebrew claim his innovative use of the language is lost in translation. Subtle layers of meaning achieved using an ancient word rather than its modern synonym to impart a biblical connotation cannot always be conveyed. In Amichai's love poem In the Middle of This Century, for instance, the English translation reads: "the linsey-woolsey of our being together". The Hebrew term, shaatnez, refers to the biblical taboo on interweaving linen and wool, which a Hebrew reader would grasp as an image of forbidden union.

== Literary work ==
Amichai traced his beginnings as a poetry lover to when he was stationed with the British army in Egypt. There he happened to find an anthology of modern British poetry, and the works of Dylan Thomas, T. S. Eliot, and W. H. Auden. That book inspired his first thoughts about becoming a writer.

Literary scholar Boaz Arpaly wrote about the influence of biography on Amichai's poetry: "Literary criticism made the determination long ago that despite the autobiographical character of Amichai's poetry, the individual depicted in it is the typical Israeli everyman, and even in a wider sense, the individual as an individual of the twentieth century (a poetics that interweaves the private with the typically generic) ... Amichai routinely conflates biographical details from different times into one poetic framework, and exploits drafts and poetic ideas that were recorded in different periods, for a poem that would be written years later." "Almost every poem by Amichai is a statement about the general human condition and Amichai, in a certain sense, is always a philosophical poet."

He changed his name to Yehuda Amichai ("my people lives") around 1946. In her biography of Amichai, literary critic Nili Scharf Gold writes that the idea for the name change, as well as the name "Amichai", came from his girlfriend, Ruth Herrmann, who later moved to the United States and married Eric Zielenziger. Contrary to Gold's claim, Amichai said in an interview that it was his idea to choose the name Amichai: "it was common at that time to change (foreign) names into Hebrew names ... 'Amichai' was a right name, because it was Socialist, Zionist and optimistic."

Gold wrote that a childhood trauma in Germany affected Amichai's later poetry. She claims in her book that Amichai had an argument with a childhood friend, Ruth Hanover, which led to her cycling home angrily. Ruth was caught in a traffic accident, as a result of which she had to have a leg amputated, and Gold claims that Amichai felt guilt and responsibility. Ruth later was murdered in the Holocaust. Amichai occasionally referred to her in his poems as "Little Ruth".

In an interview Amichai said: "Little Ruth is my Anne Frank". "I found out that she (Little Ruth) was in the last transport in 1944. This knowledge goes with me all the time, not because of guilt." "If there is any guilty feeling it's like the guilt that soldiers feel when they survive the battle while their friends were killed."

Robert Alter wrote about Gold's contention: "Again and again Gold asks why Amichai did not represent his German childhood in his poetry, except fragmentarily and obliquely. The inconvenient fact that his major novel, Not of This time, Not of This Place, devotes elaborate attention to Würzburg (which is given the fictional name Weinburg) is not allowed to trouble Gold's thesis of suppression, because the book is fiction, not poetry, and hence is thought somehow to belong to a different category in regard to the writer's relation to his early years. But Gold's notion of Amichai's 'poetics of camouflage' rests on an entirely unexamined assumption—that it is the task of the poet to represent his life directly and in full ..." However, contrary to Alter's claims, Gold argued that Amichai only wrote extensively about Würzburg in his novel because it was not his primary genre and therefore would be read by fewer people. Moreover, Not of This Time, Not of This Place does not hide the fact that it is based on Amichai's autobiography, including both his trip to his former hometown (and, explicitly, his search for closure about Little Ruth) and his affair with an American woman.

Amichai wrote many plays and radio plays, a book of short stories, and a second novel.

Boaz Arpaly wrote: "Amichai did not hide in his poetry the fact that he was an immigrant and a son of immigrants, but he chose to tell the story of his childhood in his hometown, in his novel Not of This Time, Not of This Place, and like any other writer, he decided which material of his life will become material to his poetry..."

Did Amichai want to become a national poet? ... his poetry embodied a silent but piercing revolution against the social and political institutions that enslave the life and happiness of the individual for their need – He should bother so much to build for himself the mythology of a national poet? All the things that Gold thinks he was hiding were not in any contrast to the unique "nationality" embodied in his poetry. I did not find in Gold's book an explanation to the concept 'national poet' but in the first place, this concept appears in her book she is pointing to my article (1997) that says: "of all the poets who began to at the time of Amichai, or in later years, since Alterman there was not a poet more popular than Amichai. In this he is unique. He is probably the only canonic poet read by so many, also by people that do not belong to the Literary Community. In this matter he has no rivals. From this aspect, at least, he may be considered a national poet, a title that does not suit him from any other point of view ..." Gold's use of that title is not clear and not responsible.

== Critical acclaim ==
Amichai's poetry in English appeared in the first issue of Modern Poetry in Translation, edited by Daniel Weissbort and Ted Hughes in 1965. In 1966 he appeared at the Spoleto poetry festival with Ezra Pound, W.H. Auden, Pablo Neruda and others. In 1968, he appeared at the London Poetry Festival. His first book in English, Selected Poems (1968), was translated by Assia Guttman (Hughes' lover and mother to his daughter Shura). Referring to him as "the great Israeli poet", Jonathan Wilson wrote in The New York Times that he is, "one of very few contemporary poets to have reached a broad cross-section without compromising his art. He was loved by his readers worldwide."

In the Times Literary Supplement, Ted Hughes wrote: "I've become more than ever convinced that Amichai is one of the biggest, most essential, most durable poetic voices of this past century – one of the most intimate, alive and human, wise, humorous, true, loving, inwardly free and resourceful, at home in every human situation. One of the real treasures."

In The American Poetry Review, May–June 2016, David Biespiel wrote: "He translates the hardness of existence into new tenderness; tenderness into spiritual wonder that is meant to quiet outrage; and outrage into a mixture of worry and love and warmth ... He is one of the great joyful lamenters of all time, endlessly documenting his anguish, throbbing pains, mistaken dreams, shortages of faith, abundances of ecstatic loves, and humiliations. And, like everyone else, he wants everything both ways. In particular, he wants to be a lover and a loner, a guy in the street and an intellectual, believer and infidel, while insisting that all manifestations of war against the human spirit be mercilessly squashed."

Anthony Hecht said in 2000 that Open Closed Open "is as deeply spiritual a poem as any I have read in modern times, not excluding Eliot's Four Quartets, or anything to be found in the works of professional religionists. It is an incomparable triumph. Be immediately assured that this does not mean devoid of humor, or without a rich sense of comedy.". And: "not only superb, but would, all by itself, have merited a Nobel Prize."

Author Nicole Krauss has said that she was affected by Amichai from a young age.

Amichai's poetry has been translated into 40 languages.

== Mention in the Pope’s Address (2025) ==
In 2025, the poetry of Yehuda Amichai was quoted in Pope Leo XIV’s official Christmas address (“Urbi et Orbi”) delivered at the Vatican. During the address, the Pope recited lines from one of Amichai’s poems without explicitly naming the poet, situating them within a universal message of compassion, humanity, and hope in the face of global suffering and war.

The reference was widely reported in the international media, including coverage by CNN of the Christmas address, and it also appears in the official text of the address published on the Vatican’s website.

The event was highlighted as further evidence of the international influence of Amichai’s poetry and its ability to transcend religious, cultural, and national boundaries decades after his death.

== U2 track ==
In February 2026, the Irish rock band, U2 released the Days of Ash EP including a reading of Amichai's poem "Wildpeace" by Nigerian artist Adeola of Les Amazones d'Afrique.

== Awards and honours ==
- 1957 – Shlonsky Prize
- 1969 – Brenner Prize
- 1976 – Bialik Prize for literature (co-recipient with essayist Yeshurun Keshet)
- 1981 – Würzburg's Prize for Culture (Germany)
- 1982 – Israel Prize for Hebrew poetry. The prize citation reads, in part: "Through his synthesis of the poetic with the everyday, Yehuda Amichai effected a revolutionary change in both the subject matter and the language of poetry."
- 1986 – Agnon Prize
- 1994 – Malraux Prize: International Book Fair (France)
- 1994 – Literary Lion Award (New York)
- 1995 – Macedonia's Golden Wreath Award: International Poetry Festival
- 1996 – Norwegian Bjornson Poetry Award

Amichai received an Honor Citation from Assiut University, Egypt, and numerous honorary doctorates. He became an Honorary Member of the American Academy of Arts and Letters (1986), and a Foreign Honorary Member of the American Academy of Arts and Sciences (1991). His work is included in the "100 Greatest Works of Modern Jewish Literature" (2001), and in international anthologies Poems for the Millennium by J. Rothenberg and P. Joris, and 100 Great Poems of the 20th Century by Mark Strand. He was nominated for the Nobel Prize several times, but never won. Tufts University English professor Jonathan Wilson wrote, "He should have won the Nobel Prize in any of the last 20 years, but he knew that as far as the Scandinavian judges were concerned, and whatever his personal politics, which were indubitably on the dovish side, he came from the wrong side of the stockade."

== Amichai Archive ==
Amichai sold his archive for over $200,000 to the Beinecke Rare Book and Manuscript Library of Yale University. The archive contains 1,500 letters received from the early 1960s to the early 1990s from dozens of Israeli writers, poets, intellectuals and politicians. Overseas correspondence includes letters from Ted Hughes, Arthur Miller, Erica Jong, Paul Celan, and many others. The archive also includes dozens of unpublished poems, stories and plays; 50 notebooks and notepads with 1,500 pages of notes, poems, thoughts and drafts from the 1950s onward; and the poet's diaries, which he kept for 40 years. According to Moshe Mossek, former head of the Israel State Archive, these materials offer priceless data about Amichai's life and work.

== Works in other languages ==
=== English ===
- The Poetry of Yehuda Amichai. Yehuda Amichai; Edited by Robert Alter. New York: FSG, 2015.
- A Life of Poetry, 1948–1994. Selected and translated by Benjamin and Barbara Harshav. New York: HarperCollins, 1994.
- Amen. Translated by the author and Ted Hughes. New York: Harper & Row, 1977.
- Even a Fist Was Once an Open Palm with Fingers: Recent Poems. Selected and translated by Barbara and Benjamin Harshav. New York: HarperPerennial, 1991.
- Exile at Home. New York: Harry N. Abrams, 1998.
- Great Tranquility: Questions and Answers. Translated by Glenda Abramson and Tudor Parfitt. New York: Harper & Row, 1983.
- Killing Him: A Radio Play. Translated by Adam Seelig and Hadar Makov-Hasson. Chicago: Poetry Magazine, July–August 2008.
- Love Poems: A Bilingual Edition. New York: Harper & Row, 1981.
- Not of this Time, Not of this Place. Translated by Shlomo Katz. New York: Harper & Row, 1968.
- On New Year's Day, Next to a House Being Built: A Poem. Knotting [England]: Sceptre Press, 1979.
- Open Closed Open: Poems. Translated by Chana Bloch and Chana Kronfeld. New York: Harcourt, 2000. (Shortlisted for the 2001 International Griffin Poetry Prize)
- Poems of Jerusalem: A Bilingual Edition - accompanied by photographs by Aliza Auerbach. New York: Harper & Row, 1988.
- Selected Poems. Translated by Assia Gutmann. London: Cape Goliard Press, 1968.
- Selected Poems. Translated by Assia Gutmann and Harold Schimmel with the collaboration of Ted Hughes. Harmondsworth: Penguin Books, 1971.
- Selected Poems. Edited by Ted Hughes and Daniel Weissbort. London: Faber & Faber, 2000.
- Selected Poetry of Yehuda Amichai. Edited and translated by Chana Bloch and Stephen Mitchell. New York: Harper & Row, 1986. Newly revised and expanded edition: Berkeley: University of California Press, 1996.
- Songs of Jerusalem and Myself. Translated by Harold Schimmel. New York: Harper & Row, 1973.
- Time. Translated by the author with Ted Hughes. New York: Harper & Row, 1979.
- Travels. Translated by Ruth Nevo. Toronto: Exile Editions, 1986.
- Travels of a Latter-Day Benjamin of Tudela. Translated by Ruth Nevo. Missouri: Webster Review, 1977.
- The World Is a Room and Other Stories. Translated by Elinor Grumet. Philadelphia: Jewish Publication Society, 1984.
- Jerusalem 1967–1990, London, poem by Yehuda Amichai, collaboration with artist Maty Grunberg, portfolio of 56 woodcuts, limited edition.
- The Amichai Windows. Limited edition artist book of 18 Amichai poems letterpressed with photo collages. Translation by artist Rick Black. Turtle Light Press, 2017.

=== Nepali ===
Many of Amichai's poems have been translated into Nepali by Suman Pokhrel, and some are collected in an anthology titled Manpareka Kehi Kavita. His poems included in this anthology are, "My Father" as "MERA BAA," "Forgetting Something" as "BIRSANU," "Do not Accept" as "SWEEKAR NAGARA," and "A Jewish Cemetery in Germany" as "JARMANIKO YAHUDI CHIHANGHRI" .

=== Burmese ===
A total of 37 poems of Yehuda Amichai have been translated into Burmese and published in Yangon, Myanmar in March 2018. Burmese poet and translator, Myo Tayzar Maung, translated and the book has been published by the Eras Publishing House.

=== Russian ===
- Elohim Merahem Al Yaldei Ha'Gan. Selected and translated by Alexander Volovik. Bilingual edition. Shoken, 1991.
- Помнить - это разновидность надежды. Selected and translated by Alexander Barash. Книжники, 2019.
- Сейчас и в другие дни. Selected and translated by Alexander Barash. Кабинетный учёный, 2021.
- Точность боли и размытость счастья. Selected and translated by Alexander Barash. Издательство книжного магазина "Бабель", 2024.

== See also ==
- List of Israel Prize recipients
- Hebrew Literature
- The Yehuda Amichai Prize
