= Arne Kokkvoll =

Norwegian historian

Arne Kokkvoll (1925 – 19 September 1998) was a Norwegian historian, librarian/archivist and politician for the Labour Party.

== Biography ==
He was born at Kokkvollen in Røros Municipality, and took the cand.philol. degree in 1957. His master's thesis was about Johannes Nesse, and it was published later as a book. Kokkvoll worked as a teacher and was a research assistant at the Norwegian Institute of Local History before being hired as director of the Labour Movement Archive and Library. He held this post until 1987, and was also acting docent at the University of Trondheim from 1976 to 1978. He was later the director of Olavsgruva Museum in Røros.

He was also a leader of the Norwegian Movement for Vietnam from 1969 to 1972, and he led Oslo Arbeidersamfunn from 1966 to 1967. From 1988 to 1991 he was the mayor of Røros, representing the Labour Party.

Kokkvoll was not a prolific writer, but held many lectures, especially for the labour movement. He published Av og for det arbeidende folket in 1981, and he was the editor for the six-volume work Arbeiderbevegelsens historie i Norge, released between 1985 and 1990.
