= Nyhamar =

Nyhamar is a surname. Notable people with the surname include:

- Jostein Nyhamar (1922–1993), Norwegian magazine editor, biographer and politician
- Unni Nyhamar Hinkel, Norwegian handball player
- Stein Eric Nyhammer, Deadliest Catch Television personality, Norwegian fisherman
