= Egil Johansen =

Egil Johansen may refer to:

- Egil Johansen (musician) (1934–1998), Norwegian-Swedish jazz drummer
- Egil Johansen (footballer) (1962–2023), Norwegian footballer
- Egil Johansen (orienteer) (born 1954), Norwegian orienteer
- Egil Borgen Johansen (1934–1993), Norwegian archer

== See also ==
- Tor Egil Johansen (born 1950), Norwegian footballer
