= Norwegian Movement for Vietnam =

The Norwegian Movement for Vietnam (Norwegian: Vietnambevegelsen i Norge) was a Norwegian advocacy group.

Its purpose was to convey friendship and solidarity with "people of Indochina", opposing the Vietnam War. It was created in January 1968 as an offshoot of the Norwegian Solidarity Committee for Vietnam, which had been hijacked by the Socialist Youth League (SUF) to the dismay of the Workers' Youth League. Eventually, the Movement for Vietnam was joined by Socialist Youth, the Young Communist League as well as various trade unions and women's organizations.

Leaders of the Movement for Vietnam include Arne Kokkvoll (1969–1972), MP Tove Pihl (1973–1974), and Jostein Nyhamar.
