= Christian Lerche =

Norwegian physician and civil servant (1917–2008)

- Born: 23 April 1917; Kristiania, Norway
- Died: 9 June 2008 (aged 91)
- Occupations: Physician; Civil servant
- Relatives: Rolf Stranger (father-in-law)

Christian Lerche (23 April 1917 – 9 June 2008) was a Norwegian physician and civil servant.

He was born in Kristiania to Jacob Lerche Johansen and Wibecke Christiane Fredrikke Nicolaysen, and was a great-grandson of Jochum Johansen. He was married to Adèle Elisabeth Pihl Stranger from 1946, a daughter of Rolf Stranger.

Lerche was director of the Norwegian Institute of Public Health from 1957 to 1984. He was decorated Knight, First Class of the Order of St. Olav in 1979.

Civic offices
Preceded by Einar Aaser	Director of the Norwegian Institute of Public Health; 1957–1984	Succeeded by Bodolf Hareide
