= Bjornson =

Bjørnson is a Norwegian surname with the literal meaning "Son of Bjørn". Bjornson, Bjørnson, Bjørnsen, Bjornsen, Björnsson and variations can refer to the following people:

Icelanders

- Ármann Smári Björnsson (born 1981), Icelandic footballer
- Björn Th. Björnsson (1922–2007), Icelandic writer
- Eysteinn Björnsson (born 1942), Icelandic writer
- Georgia Björnsson (1884–1957), Danish-born wife of Sveinn
- Hafþór Júlíus Björnsson (born 1988), Icelandic strongman and actor
- Sveinn Björnsson (1881–1952), first president of Iceland
- Sveinn Birkir Björnsson (born 1976), editor of The Reykjavík Grapevine

Norwegians

- Bjørnstjerne Bjørnson (1832–1910), Norwegian writer, 1903 Nobel Prize
- Bjørn Bjørnson (1859–1942), Norwegian stage actor and theatre director, son of Bjørnstjerne
- Gudrød Bjørnsson, Norwegian politician in Middle Ages, grandfather of Olaf
- Ivar Bjørnson (born 1977), Norwegian musician, Enslaved
- Kari Sofie Bjørnsen (born 1967), Norwegian politician
- Øyvind Bjørnson, (1950–2007), Norwegian historian

Swedes

- Erik Björnsson, 9th century semi-legendary Swedish king
- Johan Björnsson Printz, governor of New Sweden
- Olof (II) Björnsson, 10th century semi-legendary Swedish king

Other nationalities

- Craig Bjornson (born 1969), American baseball coach
- David Bjornson (born 1947), Canadian politician
- Eric Bjornson (born 1971), American football player
- Erik Bjornsen (born 1991), American cross country skier
- Karen Bjornson (born 1952), American model
- Maria Björnson (1949–2002), French theatre stage designer
- Mette Koefoed Bjørnsen (1920–2008), Danish author, conciliator and economist
- Oscar Bjornson (1906–1972), Canadian politician
- Peter Bjornson, Canadian politician
- Rosella Bjornson (born 1947), Canadian airline pilot
- Sadie Maubet Bjornsen (born 1989), American cross country skier
- Val Bjornson (1906–1987), American politician
