= Per Maurseth =

Norwegian historian and politician (1932–2013)

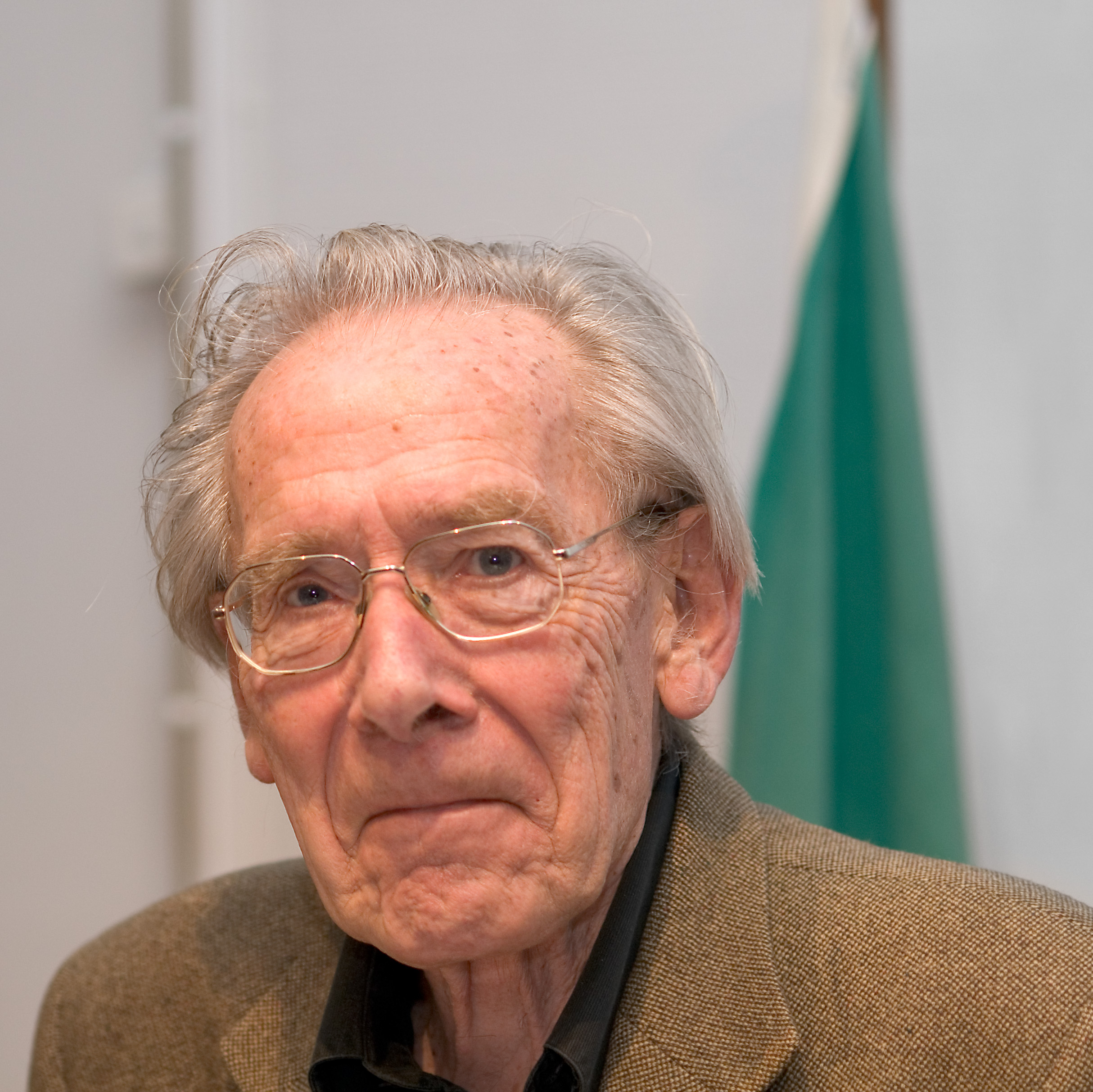
- Born: 7 June 1932; Bergen, Norway
- Died: 10 May 2013 (aged 80); Oslo
- Occupations: Historian and politician
- Employer: University of Trondheim

Per Maurseth (7 June 1932 – 10 May 2013) was a Norwegian historian and politician for the Socialist Left Party.

He was an associate professor at the University of Oslo from 1971, and was appointed professor at the University of Trondheim from 1982 to his retirement. Among his books are Fra Moskvateser til Kristianiaforslag from 1972, and volume three of the six-volume set Arbeiderbevegelsens historie i Norge from 1988, his part covering the history of the labour movement in Norway from 1920 to 1935. He also edited the academic journal Tidsskrift for arbeiderbevegelsens historie from 1976 to 1986. He was a fellow of the Norwegian Academy of Science and Letters.
