= Einar Aaser =

Norwegian civil servant (1886–1976)

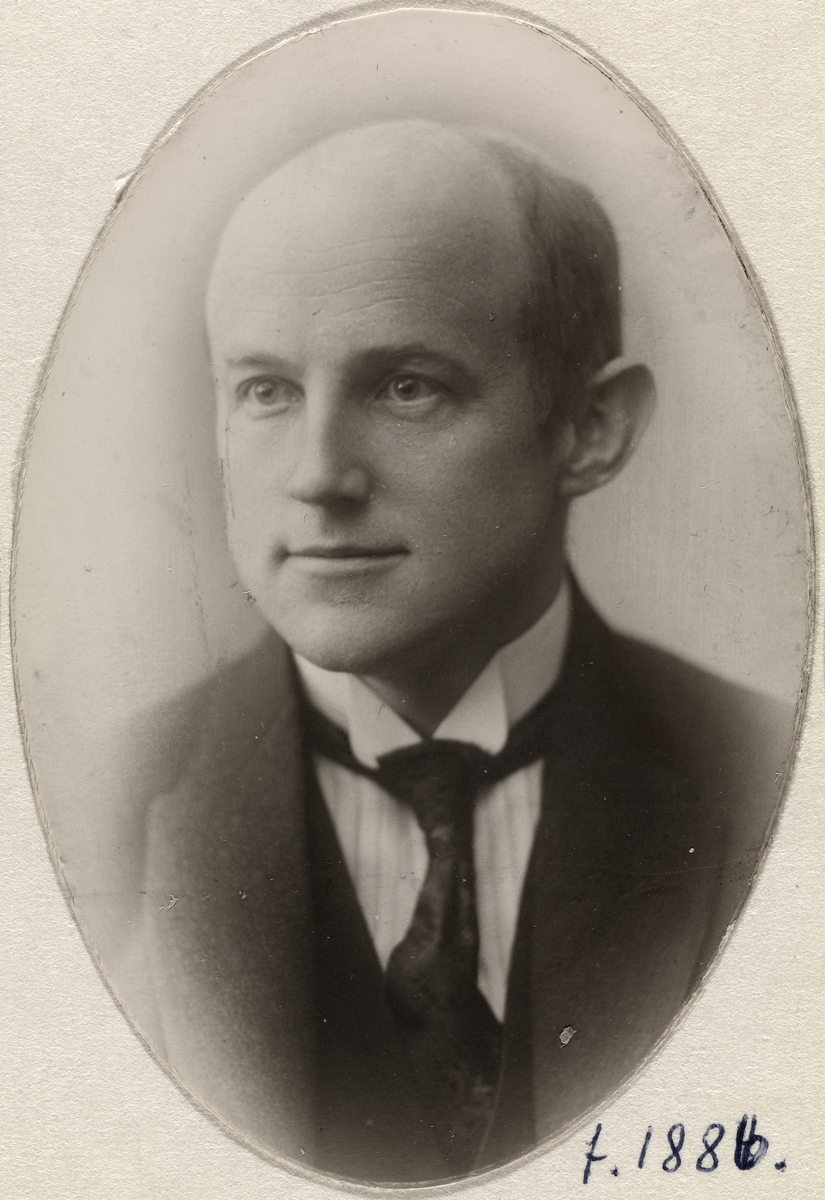

Einar Aaser (1886 – 28 August 1976) was a Norwegian physician and civil servant.

He finished his secondary education in 1905, took his cand.med. degree in 1912 and the dr.med. degree in 1920. He worked as a private physician at Bekkelagshøgda from 1919 to 1928. In 1929 he became the first director of the Norwegian Institute of Public Health, serving the rest of his career until 1956. He also chaired the Norwegian Cancer Prevention Society from 1944 to 1945.

He died in August 1976.

Civic offices
New title	Director of the Norwegian Institute of Public Health; 1929–1956	Succeeded by Christian Lerche
