= Cholo Montironi =

Argentine musician (1931–2025)

Rodolfo Miguel Montironi
- Born: 4 December 1931; Rosario, Santa Fe, Argentina
- Died: 25 October 2025 (aged 93)
- Genre: Classical
- Occupations: Bandoneonist, conductor, arranger and composer
- Years active: 1942–2025

Rodolfo Miguel Montironi (4 December 1931 – 25 October 2025) was an Argentine bandoneonist, conductor, composer and arranger who was involved in many tango orchestras in addition to his own.

== Life and career ==
=== Early life ===
Montironi was born at Centenario Hospital in Rosario but resides in Pueblo Paganini, currently named Granadero Baigorria, a small town north of Rosario, and he has lived his entire life in this city. At the age of five, he received a bandoneon (from his mother) of German origin. The first musical training he received was from the accordionist Jesus Angel Videla. After receiving some teaching he performed in school productions and at local festivals. He made his radio debut in 1939 (eight years old) on the program La hora de todos (Time for all) aired on Cerealista LT3 Radio City Rosario. From 1940 he began taking classes with bandoneonist Julio Barbosa, who along with Antonio Ríos and Julio Ahumada, were among the best tango musicians in Rosario.

=== Career ===
Between 1941 and 1964 he played in more than 15 orchestras including: Vicente Viviano (1941), Orquesta Tipica Astral (1942), Julio Barbosa (1944), Leopoldo Líberjens, Julio Barbosa boyband (1948), Antonio Rios (1953), the bandoneonist José Brondel (1956), singer Alfredo Belusi (Montironi as a leader and arranger), José Sala (1958 to 1965 in parallel with other assignments). In 1960 he joined Jorge Arduhs orchestra and in November 1960 he played with the charango player Jaime Torres and the violinist Antonio Agri. From May 1961 he also played with Franco Corvini and from 1963 he made arrangements for the Rosarino Tango Quintet. In July 1963 he joined the orchestra of bandoneonist Domingo Federico. During a carnival in 1964 he was a part of Francini-Stamponi's orchestra, that was visiting Rosario and in May 1964 he joined the orchestra of Aldo Calderón.

=== International career ===
It was a difficult period for the tango culture during the late 1970s. The instrument; bandoneon participated in various ensembles that were often formed to follow more timely correct recruitments. In 1977 he took part in a U.S. tour with the singer Alberto Morán. They performed at Madison Square Garden (New York City), Disneyland (Florida), Hollywood, Holidays Inn hotel chain and Club de Las Americas99 in Miami (Florida). In the following years he toured almost every country in Latin America.

During 1977 he also made appearances with Jorge Sobral in Rio de Janeiro (Brazil). Back home he formed the Montironi Trio with Héctor Stamponi (piano) and Héctor Console (Double bass) to follow Jorge Sobral. They debuted January 4, 1978, in Caño 14, in Buenos Aires, and the same year they traveled to Madrid. In 1980, they recorded an album titled Jorge Sobral en Espana. During his stay in Spain he also recorded several Albums containing music from several various styles including: Music for children and jazz with the Guardia Gran Canaria Orchestra together with Raphael and Concha Piquer. He also participated in the rock opera Evita (Tim Rice and Andrew Lloyd Webber), played with singers Paloma San Basilio, Patxi Andión and the Orquesta Nacional de España; consisting of eighty-two members.

In Buenos Aires, he joined the staff of the local Taconeando ran by Beba Bidart. There he performed for five years with artists such as Alberto Hidalgo, Omar Murtagh, Joseph Colangelo and Carlos Rossi. With Rossi he toured his home country in 1984 and he recorded the album E mi manera (My way). He traveled regularly to Europe. In October, 1982 he presented the show Grandes Valores del Tango at the Palladium Boite (Madrid), and later in Trottoirs de Buenos Aires (Paris). He became director of this venue – considered the Cathedral of tango in Europe – where he, among other people, met Julio Cortázar, Edgardo Canton and Susana Rinaldi. Some of his important and notable experiences include: a duo with accordionist Raúl Barboza and various performances at venues with the French duo Salgán-De Lio in 1988. Furthermore; a quintet that included Osvaldo Montes (bandoneon), Ciro Pérez (guitar) and in which also Gustavo Beytelman (piano) played, he performed at the Trottoirs and at the 10th anniversary of the as a tribute to Carlos Gardel. Cellist Fanette Pelissier appeared as «special guest».

In 1988 he led the band that was the backing group for the singer Ricardo Sivinar during the recording of the album Adiós Nonino (music by Astor Piazzolla). The collection of musicians was a dream team, Francisco Tejedor (piano), Rodolfo Montironi (bandoneon), Antonio Agri (violin) and Omar Murtagh (bass). From the early nineties he played in groups with young musicians in Rosario, such as Camandulaje. In 1994, Cholo again accompanied Ricardo Sivinar when he recorded his second album. In addition, the Ministry of Culture published in a «Rosario album» by his trio which included Antonio Agri on violin, and vocal contributions by Marcos Andino and Ricardo Paradiso.

Meanwhile, he stayed in Europe most of the year, he performed at the Olympia theater of Paris and as a soloist with the Orchestra of the Capital of Toulouse, conducted by Michel Plasson. The concert was repeated in Madrid, Barcelona and Granada and he was a soloist on bandoneon with the Royal Philharmonic Orchestra in London. He performed concerts at Auditorio Manuel de Falla at Alhambra in Granada, the Roman amphitheater in Syracuse, Sicily, in Florida, Madrid and Radio France, Paris. On August 6, 2001, he gave a concert at the theater Beniamino Gigli, Porto Recanati (Macerata, Italy) where Salvattore Pischitelli, Consul of the municipality Recanati, gave him the title «Gentle citizen of the municipality».

On 11 April 2002, the leader of the city council in Baigorria proclaimed him an honorary citizen of the city, "...in recognition of his distinguished career in our country, in several countries in America and worldwide." On May 28, 2004, he was also declared a «Prominent Artist of Rosario City» by the City Council. On September 23rd of the same year, Rosario municipality adopted Decree No. 24478 where the intersection of the streets Aristóbulo del Valle and Pueyrredón in Barrio Pichincha were named after Rodolfo Cholo Montironi. The following year he appeared, to great acclaim, on Ariston Milan, along with (among others) pianist Barbara Varassi (Rosario) and Alfonso Pacín who played violin and also doubled on guitar. In 2005, he returned to the recording studio where he conducted the backing group for the singer Germán Becker (1980 – ). During the following years, he continued to visit different countries with his bandoneon while he intensified his teaching.

In July 2006, he recorded the album Paris Rosario, accompanied by Alfonso Pacín on guitar in the studio Lo Pacín en Romainville (París). They performed works by Carlos Gardel, Piazzolla, Lennon-McCartney, Charles Aznavour. In 2010, the Musimedios Foundation and the Ministry of Culture in Rosario edited this album. These tracks were cut from the album recorded in Lo Pacin studio Romain, Paris, July 2006.

Montironi wrote numerous arrangements for a wide range of performers, from solo bandoneon to large orchestral scores. He arranged a large number of tango pieces for the Norwegian bandoneonist Kåre Jostein Simonsen who visited "Cholo" repeatedly over the last ten years. Among these works are the trio pieces for Simonsen's Master's Degree concert for performing bandoneon at the NTNU Trondheim Conservatory of Music in 2013.

During an interview in 2010, he stated that he has made 64 trips to Europe and nine to the United States, he also performed in Algeria, China and Japan.

On 24 August 2012, the Argentine House of Representatives honored Montironi as a «Famous ambassador of Argentina» in the main hall of Parliament (Buenos Aires).

Montironi continued to be active in various venues in Rosario with his trio, with Javier Martínez Lo Re (piano) and Ruben Mill (bass), and alternated between Rodolfo Demar, Gaby Estrada and Leonel Capitano (vocals), and used Ernesto Renzi as reciter.

=== Death ===
Montironi died on 25 October 2025, at the age of 93.

== Personal orchestras ==
=== Discepolín ===
In the middle of 1964, he formed his own orchestra Montironi Discepolín. The members of the orchestra were Rodolfo Montironi (bandoneon), Raúl Ocaña (piano), Carlos Padula (guitar), David Elia (violin), Domingo Fiore (bass), Roberto Dumas and Oscar Juárez (vocals). In the following years he alternated the singers with Ángel Barrios and Raúl Encina. In 1968, the Polish singer Roberto Goyeneche traveled regularly to Rosario and collaborated with Cholo. Together they toured the northern part of the province of Santa Fe, Chaco and Corrientes. He also shared the stage with other great performers within the genre such as Floreal Ruiz, Miguel Montero and José Libertella.

=== Montironi trio ===
In 1969 he formed a trio with Francisco Tejedor (piano) and Joseph Rios (bass). The trio often performed with singers such as; Jorge Valdez, Mario Bustos. Together with the singer Carlos Budini, Montironi formed a duo for a cabaret in Morocco, where they shared the stage with Rita Salvaje.

Besides this, he worked with Raúl Lavi and his wife Lidia Elsa Satragno (Pinky) in a performance of music and poetry. The plot of the performance took place in Rosario and other cities in the province of Santa Fe, such as Rafaela and Corral de Bustos. He recorded an album with his band and singer Luis Correa to lyrics from their own tango poet Francisco Sappietro.

== Tango compositions, selection ==
- Cinco lucas.
- Che Satán.
- Un kilo de nada.
- ¿Qué pasa, hermano?.
- Trinchereando.
- Milonga del moplo (milonga).
- Navidad en las estrellas.
- Para vos campeón.
- Sublime fantasía.
- Sembrando milonga (texts Carlos Rossi).
- Empezá a ganar (tekst Carlos Rossi), recorded by Rossi and Carlos Morel.
- Aves ciegas (tekst Miguel Jubany), recorded by Carlos Rossi og Jorge Sobral, both accompanied by Montironi.
- Petichango.
- Escuchame, Brando.
- Libertad, yo te canto, recorded by Ernesto Rondó.
- Aires criollos, collaboration with Antonio Ríos; was recorded by Alfonso Pacín Montironi at guitar.
- Cordialmente.
- Fantasía ibérica (malaguena).

== Discography selection ==
- Recordándote, with Alfredo Belusi (singer) (1956)
- Album, Quintet Rosarino de Tango (1963)
- Album, Montironi Trio with Luis Correa (singer) (1969)
- The Voice of Buenos Aires, Montironi with Jorge Sobral, singer (1979)
- Jorge Sobral en Espana, Montironi Trio with Jorge Sobral, singer (1980)
- En mi Manera, "All-star combo band" with the singer Jorge Rossi (1984).
- Adios Nonino. with Ricardo Sivina, singer (1988).
- Canto Bandoneon & Cuerdas.... Ricardo Sivina & Rodolfo Montironi (1994).
- Paris-Rosario, accompanied by Alfonso Pacín at guitar (2006).
- Una Voz de Bandoneon. Radio France / SIGNATURE (2007).
