= Arbeiderbevegelsens historie i Norge =

1985–1990 series by Tiden Norsk Forlag

Arbeiderbevegelsens historie i Norge (English: History of the Workers' Movement in Norway) is a six-volume work about the labour movement history of Norway. It was released between 1985 and 1990 by Tiden Norsk Forlag.

It was not the first work about the history of the Norwegian labour movement. Einhart Lorenz released the two-volume work Arbeiderbevegelsens historie. En innføring. Norsk sosialisme i internasjonalt perspektiv in 1972 and 1974.

This time, a large work was planned because of the 100th anniversary of the Norwegian Labour Party in 1987. As such, it is a party history combined with the history of other important parties as well as the trade union movement. Several of the editors and writers engaged in the project were in fact members of the Labour Party, or labour movement "sympathizers". The editors of the project were Edvard Bull, Jr., Arne Kokkvoll and Jakob Sverdrup.

The first volume, Arbeiderklassen blir til. 1850–1900 was written by Edvard Bull Jr. The second volume, På klassekampens grunn. 1900–1920 was written by Øyvind Bjørnson. The third volume, Gjennom kriser til makt. 1920–1935 was written by Per Maurseth. The fourth volume, Klassen og nasjonen. 1935–1946 was written by Tore Pryser. The fifth volume, Storhetstid. 1945–1965 was written by Trond Bergh. The sixth volume, Nye utfordringer. 1965–1990 was written by Jostein Nyhamar. The volumes were published unevenly, with the first volume released in 1985, the third and fifth in 1987, the fourth in 1988, and the second and sixth in 1990.
