= Jostein Rise =

Norwegian social psychologist

Jostein Rise (born 1945) is a Norwegian social psychologist.

He is the director of the Norwegian Institute for Alcohol and Drug Research from 1 October 2005, having worked there since 2002. He has been a professor at the University of Bergen, and assisting professor (professor II) at the Norwegian University of Science and Technology and the University of Oslo.

Government offices
Preceded by	Director of the Norwegian Institute for Alcohol and Drug Research; 2005–present	Incumbent
