= Harald Sæther =

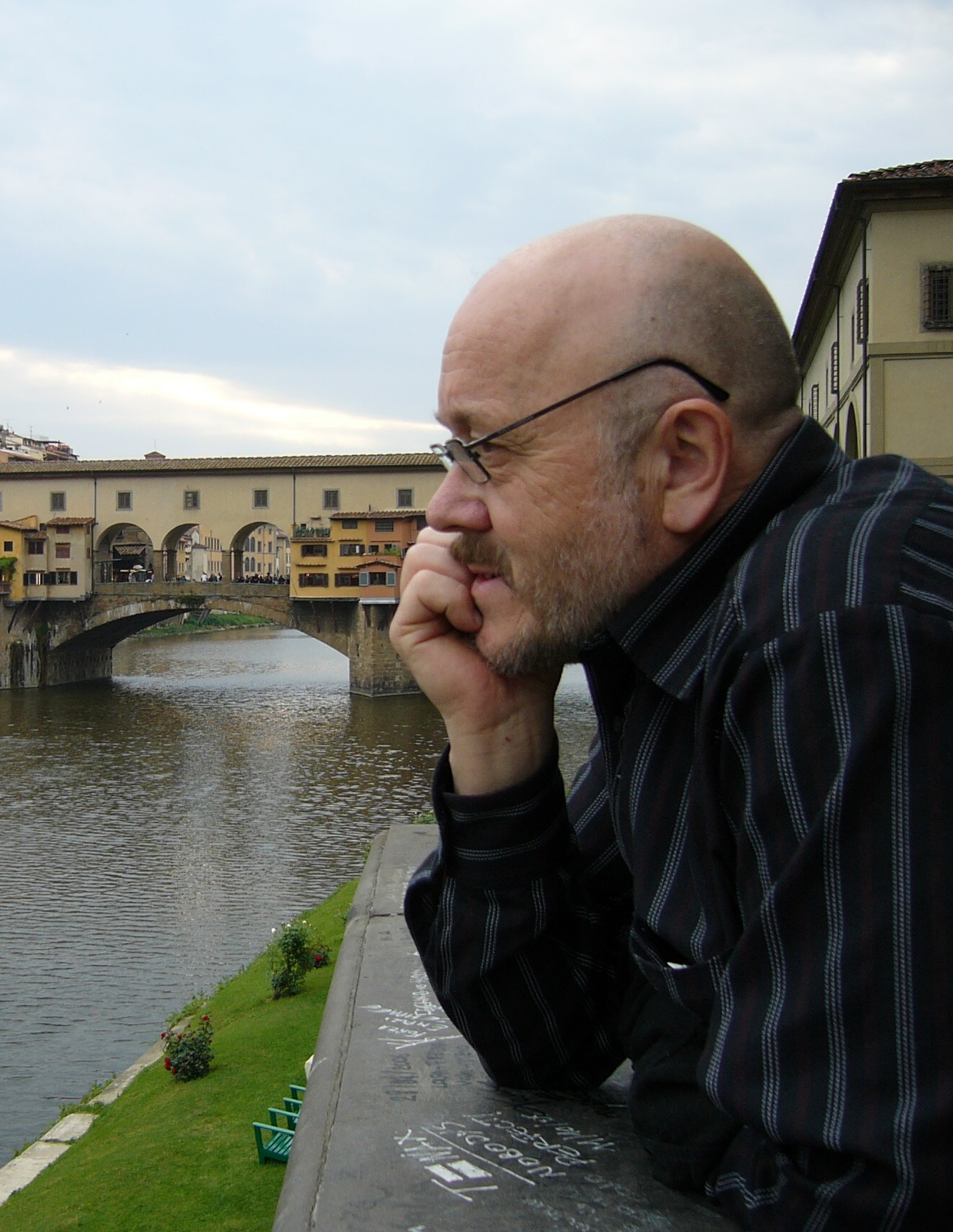
- Harald Sæther in Florence (2005)

Background information
- Born: 9 May 1946 (age 80); Oppdal Municipality, Norway
- Genres: Classical, Contemporary
- Occupations: Composer, Musician
- Website: www://haraldsaether.no

Harald Sæther (born 9 May 1946) is a Norwegian composer with a diploma (MA) from Grieg Academy (2008) . He is member of the Norwegian Society of Composers and New Music Composers Group (NMK) where he was chairman from 2009 to 2011.

== Biography ==
=== Education ===
Sæther is basically a self-taught musician from the early 1960s, with guitar - later electric bass - as his main instrument. In 1963 he, along with three other boys, formed a rock and roll group - The Spiritual Man Group - in Oppdal Municipality, Norway. This group disbanded in 1966, and in 1967, he and four other boys formed the hard rock band Hapax Legomenon which was disbanded in the summer of 1970.

In 1971 he started his musical education at the Veitvet Music Conservatory in Oslo, with the violin as his main instrument. After three years at this institution he continued his studies as a musician and music teacher at Trondheim Conservatory of Music in Trondheim, until the spring of 1977.

=== Career ===
After 25 years as a musician and music teacher, in 2001 he was badly injured in a serious traffic accident and had to interrupt his career. This led him to The Grieg Academy in Bergen, where he earned a master's degree (MA) in composition in 2008, with Morten Eide Pedersen as his supervisor.

Sæther has had his music performed by Oslo Sinfonietta and Oslo Soloists Ensemble in Oslo, FMKV (Military Brass Band Orchestra) and the Grieg Academy Sinfonietta in Bergen, Trondheim Sinfonietta in Trondheim, Kristiansund Symphony in Kristiansund, and by several smaller groups and ensembles in Oslo, Bergen, Stavanger and Kristiansund.

In 2008 he had works performed in the ULTIMA Oslo Contemporary Music Festival; in 2010, at the 30-year anniversary of the New Music Composers' Group, at the Numusic Festival in Stavanger; and in 2011 at the Borealis Festival in Bergen.

Sæther is a full-time free-lance composer and has his edited works deposited with MIC (Music Information Centre in Norway).

== Works List ==
=== Orchestra ===
- Blomen på Dovrefjell (for soprano and orchestra) 1996, lyrics by Ola Setrom. Written to the 100 anniversary of the author's birth.
- På Sygelejet (for soprano and orchestra) 1997/1998, lyrics by Henrik Wergeland.
- Når du vert gamal (for soprano and orchestra) 1997 1998, lyrics by Jacob Sande.
- Tableaux I, Images Cosmiques (for symphonic band) 2006. Written to The Military Brass Band in Bergen FMKV, Durata 3'45 ".

=== Sinfonietta ===
- Tableaux II, Images l'Air (for sinfonietta) 2008. Written for the Oslo Sinfonietta to the 30 years anniversary for NMK, Durata 3'40 ".
- Resonance Magnetico di Scansione (for sinfonietta) 2010. Written for the Cikada commissioned by NMK, Durata 8'30 ".
- Palimpsest (for sinfonietta) 2011. Written to the Borealis Festival in Bergen Bit20 commissioned by NMK, Durata ca. 4'00 ".

=== Vocals ===
- 2000 song (for children's choir and rock band) 1999 text by Astrid Volden, commissioned by Oppdal Musikkråd to mark the millennium
- Bøn frå Jord (for mixed choir) 2003/07, text and melody by Arne Hagen, Durata 3'20.
- Reise i verk (for soprano and piano) 2005/06, song cycle to texts by Margunn Hageberg, Durata ca. 30 '.
- Frie tanker(for soprano and classical guitar) 2006, song cycle to poems by Irene Paulsen, Durata ca. 22'.
- Obstupescit venti Cinque (for baritone and bassoon) 2007. Cantata to words by Nanni Cagnone, Italy Durata 16'40"
- A ' in altre parole B (for three vocal quartets) 2010, to text by Nanni Cagnone. Written Oslo Soloist Ensemble commissioned by the NMK, Durata 11.40"

=== Smaller ensembles/Solistic works ===
- Brass Quintet, three movements, 2005, Durata 21'40".
- Guerre Extreme song cycle with texts by Esther Tellermann, France (soprano, trumpet, guitar and piano) 2006, Durata ca. 13'.
- Fanfaria(Fanfare for four trumpets). Commissioned for the opening of the Oppdal Culture House, 17 March 2007, Durata ca 3'30"
- Das Mädchen oder Der Tod by the Lied Der Tod und Das Mädchen Franz Schubert (for soprano, bass, violin, mandolin and tuba) 2007, Durata ca. 12'.
- Eight bats 2007, eight miniatures for solo double bass, written for the Polish Double Basiss player Natalia Radzik, Durata ca 12'
- Index vacuus (for bandoneon, soprano, percussion and bass clarinet) song cycle with texts by Nanni Cagnone Durata about 19'30 ". Commissioned for the bandoneonist Kåre Jostein Simonsen.
- Waves (for bandoneon, percussion and bass clarinet) Durata about 15 '. Commissioned for the bandoneonist Kåre Jostein Simonsen.
- Pastorale (for marimba and tape) 2008. Written for the Ultima Festival in Oslo for Wendy Greenberg (Australia) on order from NMK, Durata 8'15".
- Jimi Hendrix in memoriam (for viola and tape) 2008. Written for the Serbian violist Rastko Popovic, Durata 3'35"
- Tableaux III, Images l'Eau (for harpsichord, electric guitar and tape) 2010. Written to NuMusic festival in Stavanger for Jane Chapman commissioned for NMK, Durata 5'40".
