= Public Health Institute of Malawi =

Facility in Lilongwe, Malawi

- Founded: January 5, 2013; 13 years ago
- Founded at: Lilongwe, Malawi
- Type: Public
- Legal status: public health
- Purpose: To deal with national public health problems
- Location: Malawi
- Director: Mathews Kagoli
- Deputy-Director: Evelyn Chitsa Banda; Joseph Bitilinyu Bango
- Head of Epidemiology and Disease Surveillance: Annie Chauma Mwale

Public Health Institute of Malawi (PHIM) is a Malawian government agency and research institute, as well as Malawi's national public health institute. It is subordinate to the Ministry of Health. PHIM builds the capacity of the country to effectively attend and deal with public health challenges including emerging communicable and non-communicable diseases.

The institute's main activities are health surveillance, research and prevention of diseases. The institute consists of research divisions for environmental health, infection control and health data, as well as mental and physical health.

== Background ==
=== Formation ===
The institution was established in the early 2013 with support from the Ministry of Health for research, prevention and controlling of diseases on national level as well as obtaining evidence that implements policy and practice in public health service delivery. The institution has also worked in collaboration with the Norwegian Institute of Public Health (NIPH) and have had a close partnership for several years. The Norwegian Institute of Public Health has also contributed to establishment of PHIM in 2013. Both institutes have similar interests in surveillance of infectious diseases in their respective countries. Part of the area that PHIM requested was IDSR, the institute's responsibility. In 2023, PHIM, along with The Ministry of Health launched the agenda for National Health Research ll and Research Methodology responsible for provision of a framework for conducting health sector research. The agenda also ensures to tackle challenges which health officials face when conducting research.
