= Nanni Cagnone =

Italian poet, novelist and essayist (1939–2026)

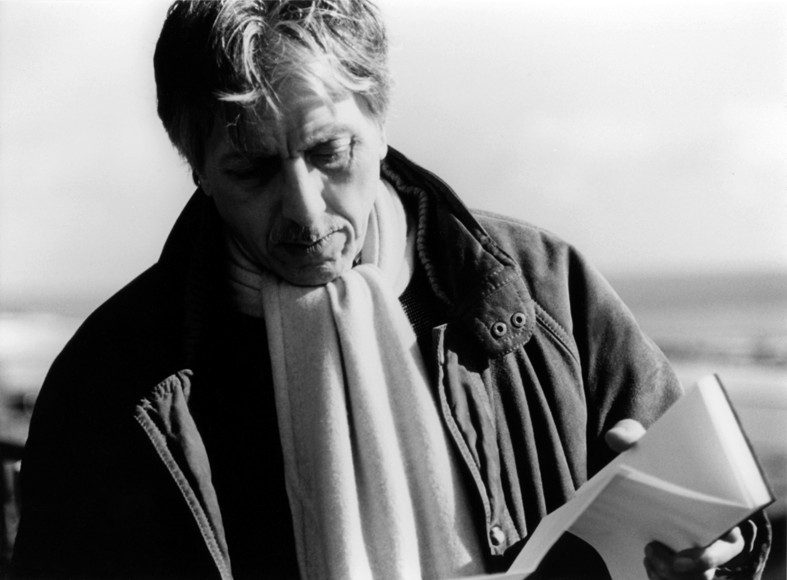
- Cagnone in 2001, photograph by Pino Usicco
- Born: 10 April 1939; Carcare, Liguria, Italy
- Died: 3 April 2026 (aged 86)
- Occupation: Writer
- Writing career
- Genres: Poetry, drama, short story, novel, essay

Nanni Cagnone (10 April 1939 – 3 April 2026) was an Italian poet, novelist, essayist, and playwright. He debuted as a poet in 1954 and since then has written several books, mostly poetry but also plays, tales and novels, theoretical essays and aphorisms, from The Disabled Youth (1967) to The Oslo Lecture (2008). He is the brother of the artist Angelo Cagnone, and was married to Sandra Holt. He lived in Bomarzo.

== Life and career ==
In the 1960s–1970s, he was senior editor of Lerici Publishers, editor of Marcatré (an avant-garde magazine of art, literature, and music), managing editor of Design Italia, and later founded and headed the Italian publishing house Coliseum. He was also a professor of aesthetics and contributed articles to newspapers and cultural magazines, among them Chelsea Review, Incognita, Alea, Or, Il Giornale, Il Messaggero, Bonniers Litterära Magasin, FMR, Il Verri. His translations include Gerard Manley Hopkins' The Wreck of the Deutschland, Aeschylus' Agamemnon, Jack Spicer's The Heads of the Town Up to the Aether, Gabriel Magaña Merlo's Intolerante superficie, Paul Vangelisti's Solitude, Parmenides' Perì Physeos.

Cagnone's works are characterized by a clean, almost purist meditation, where mythology and modernity, feeling and criticism are compressed into a peculiar and intense ontological recovery. Cagnone is said to have been one of the most innovative and distinctive poets of contemporary European literature. His poems are used as lyrics for contemporary music. The Norwegian composer Harald Sæther has written a song cycle with lyrics from Index Vacuus, the cantata Obstupescit Venticinque with lyrics from What's Hecuba to Him or He to Hecuba? and A, in altre parole B, for three vocal quartets, by the poem with the same title.

About his own poetry, Cagnone wrote: "Poetry is this interval between us and things, this interrupted feeling, the lost object in the home of desire. Poetry is an extraneous work, something sleep would teach awakening. It demands a passive feeling, a receptive thought and desires learnt by answering. Poetry is not the act of collecting the world like a rescuer of sense or a flatterer of language, but the aimless cult of an excessive figure and the experience of a faithfulness: that of a Saying, which doesn't want to leave his Silent lover. Poetry is acting beyond, beyond what one manages to think".

Cagnone died on 3 April 2026, at the age of 86.

== Awards ==
- Naples Award, 2019
- Rome Foundation Award, 2025

== Bibliography ==
- A, in altre parole B, an essay on painting (Genoa 1970)
- What's Hecuba to Him or He to Hecuba?, poems and essays (New York 1975)
- Andatura, poetry (Milan 1979)
- L'arto fantasma, essays (ed.) (Venice 1979)
- Vaticinio, a poem (Naples 1984)
- Notturno sopra il giorno, poetry (Milan 1985)
- Armi senza insegne, poetry (Milan 1988)
- G.M. Hopkins: Il naufragio del Deutschland (ed.) (Milan 1988)
- Comuni smarrimenti, a novel (Milan 1990)
- Anima del vuoto, poetry (Bari 1993)
- Avvento, poetry (Bari 1995)
- The Book of Giving Back, a poem (New York 1998)
- Il popolo delle cose, a poem (Milan 1999)
- Enter Balthâzar, a short story (New York 2000)
- Pacific Time, a novel (Milan 2001)
- Doveri dell'esilio, poetry (Pavia 2002)
- Questo posto va bene per guardare il tramonto, a play (Pavia 2002)
- L'oro guarda l'argento, selected works (Verona 2003)
- Index Vacuus, poetry (New York 2004)
- Ça mérite un détour, a short story (Milan 2007)
- Penombra, a short story (Rome 2009)
- Aeschylus: Agamemnon (ed.) (Modena 2010)
- Undeniable Things, poetry (Modena 2010)
- Penombra della lingua, poetry (Rome 2012)
- Perduta comodità del mondo, poetry (Rome 2013)
- Tacere fra gli alberi, a poem (Turin 2014)
- Discorde, essays (Lavis 2015)
- Tornare altrove, poetry (Lavis 2016)
- Corre alla sua sorte, prose (Messina 2017)
- Cammina mare, prose (Lavis 2017)
- Dites-moi, Monsieur Bovary, prose (Turin 2017)
- Ingenuitas, poesia (Lavis 2017)
- Le cose innegabili, poetry (Rome 2018)
- La genitiva terra, poetry (Lavis 2019) ISBN 978-88-95925-98-1
- Mestizia dopo gli ultimi racconti, poetry (Lavis 2020) ISBN 978-88-95925-99-8
- Accoglimento, poetry (Lavis 2020) ISBN 978-88-32236-03-3
- Ex Animo, poetry (Lavis 2020) ISBN 978-88-32236-08-8
- G.M. Hopkins, Il naufragio del Deutschland (ed.) (Macerata 2021) ISBN 978-88-98820-38-2
- Sterpi e fioriture, poetry (Lavìs 2021) ISBN 978-88-32236-18-7
- Parmenides Remastered (Macerata 2022) ISBN 978-88-98820-49-8
- Ex Animo, poetry (Lavìs 2020) ISBN 978-88-32236-03-3
- Carmina, five poems (Lavìs 2022) ISBN 978-88-32236-26-2
- "Come colui che teme e chiama" (Macerata 2023) ISBN 978-88-98820-59-7
- "Comuni smarrimenti" (Lavìs 2023) ISBN 978-88 32236-36-1
- "Sans-Gene" (Lavìs 2023) ISBN 978-88 32236-39-2
- "Esito" (Lavìs 2024) ISBN 978-88-32236-46-0
- De fraternitate [avec Angelo Lumelli & Pietro Bologna], Paris (Incisio 2026) ISBN 979-10-977151-9-9
