= Guri Rørtveit =

Norwegian physician and civil servant

- Born: 1965 (age 60–61)
- Education: University of Trondheim
- Occupations: Physician; Researcher; Civil servant
- Employer(s): University of Bergen; Norwegian Institute of Public Health

Guri Rørtveit (born 1965) is a Norwegian physician, researcher and civil servant. Since 2024 she has been director general of the Norwegian Institute of Public Health.

== Career ==
Born in 1965 and growing up in the neighbourhood of Nordnes, Bergen, Rørtveit graduated as physician from the University of Trondheim in 1991. She has a doctorate degree from the University of Bergen (UiB) from 2004, and has been a professor of family medicine at the Institute for global and public health at the UiB. She was appointed director general at the Norwegian Institute of Public Health from 2024, for a period of six years, succeeding Camilla Stoltenberg.

In an interview in the magazine Kapital in 2024, she expressed her views on various issues. She pointed at the primary care sector as being essential for a well functioning health system, and the importance of preventive healthcare or prophylaxis. Talking about global health threats, she mentioned the effects of climate change on human health, and antimicrobial resistance.
