= Liv Marit Tokle =

Norwegian politician

Liv Marit Tokle (1 February 1942 – 19 June 1993) was a Norwegian politician for the Labour Party.

She served as a deputy representative to the Parliament of Norway from Hedmark during the terms 1985–1989 and 1989–1993. In total she met during 14 days of parliamentary session. She was deputy mayor of Hamar and instrumental in preparing the city for the 1994 Winter Olympics. She chaired the limited company responsible for Hamar's Olympic venues, Hamar Olympiske Anlegg. Less than a year before the Olympics, she died at the age of 51 from cancer.
