= Sander Skogli =

Norwegian ice hockey player

- Born: 4 May 1993 (age 31); Sarpsborg, NOR
- Height: 6 ft 0 in (183 cm)
- Weight: 179 lb (81 kg; 12 st 11 lb)
- Position: Goaltender
- Shoots: Right
- GET team: Sparta Warriors
- National team: Norway

Sander Skogli (born 4 May 1993 in Sarpsborg, Norway) is a Norwegian ice hockey goaltender who plays for Sparta Warriors. He has also made several appearances for the Norwegian national team at various youth levels.

== Awards and achievements ==
Took the grand slam in the 2010/2011 season when he won with Sparta Warriors.

- 2010/2011 GET-ligaen Gold medal
- 2010/2011 The Norwegian Ice Hockey Championship Gold medal
