= Elizabeth Alexander (press secretary) =

American attorney & political advisor

Director of Communications for the First Lady of the United States
- In office January 20, 2021 – January 20, 2025
- President: Joe Biden
- First Lady: Jill Biden
- Preceded by: Annie LeHardy
- Succeeded by: Nick Clemens

Press Secretary to the Vice President of the United States
- In office January 20, 2009 – c. September 2011
- Vice President: Joe Biden
- Succeeded by: Marc Lotte (2016)

Personal details
- Born: Elizabeth Evans Alexander
- Party: Democratic
- Spouse: David Wade
- Children: 2
- Education: Texas A&M University (BA); Georgetown University (JD)

Elizabeth Evans Alexander is an American attorney and political advisor. She served as the communications director for the First Lady of the United States, Jill Biden during the presidency of Joe Biden. She previously served as press secretary to Vice President Joe Biden from 2009 to 2011.

== Early life and education ==
Alexander is from Cleburne, Texas. She earned a Bachelor of Arts degree in political science from Texas A&M University and a Juris Doctor from Georgetown University Law Center.

== Career ==
Elizabeth Alexander began working for U.S. Senator Joe Biden in 2006, as communications director in his Senate office and for the Senate Foreign Relations Committee of which he was chairman. After the 2008 election, Vice President-elect Biden named her as his press secretary in December 2008, and she served in that role from his inauguration in January 2009 until June 2011. Biden announced in May of that year that she would soon be leaving his office to practice law. Alexander was succeeded by Kendra Barkoff, the former deputy communications director and press secretary to then-Secretary of the Interior Ken Salazar.

Previously, Alexander served as press secretary for the United Nations Foundation. During the 2004 general election campaign, she traveled the country as DNC Chairman Terry McAuliffe's press secretary. During the 2004 primary campaign, she served as Rep. Dick Gephardt's South Carolina press secretary. Alexander was Rep. Adam Schiff's (D-CA) communications director and deputy press secretary for U.S. Senator Chuck Schumer (D-NY).

In November 2020, Alexander was named communications director for the First Lady of the United States, Jill Biden.
