= Kåre Jostein Simonsen =

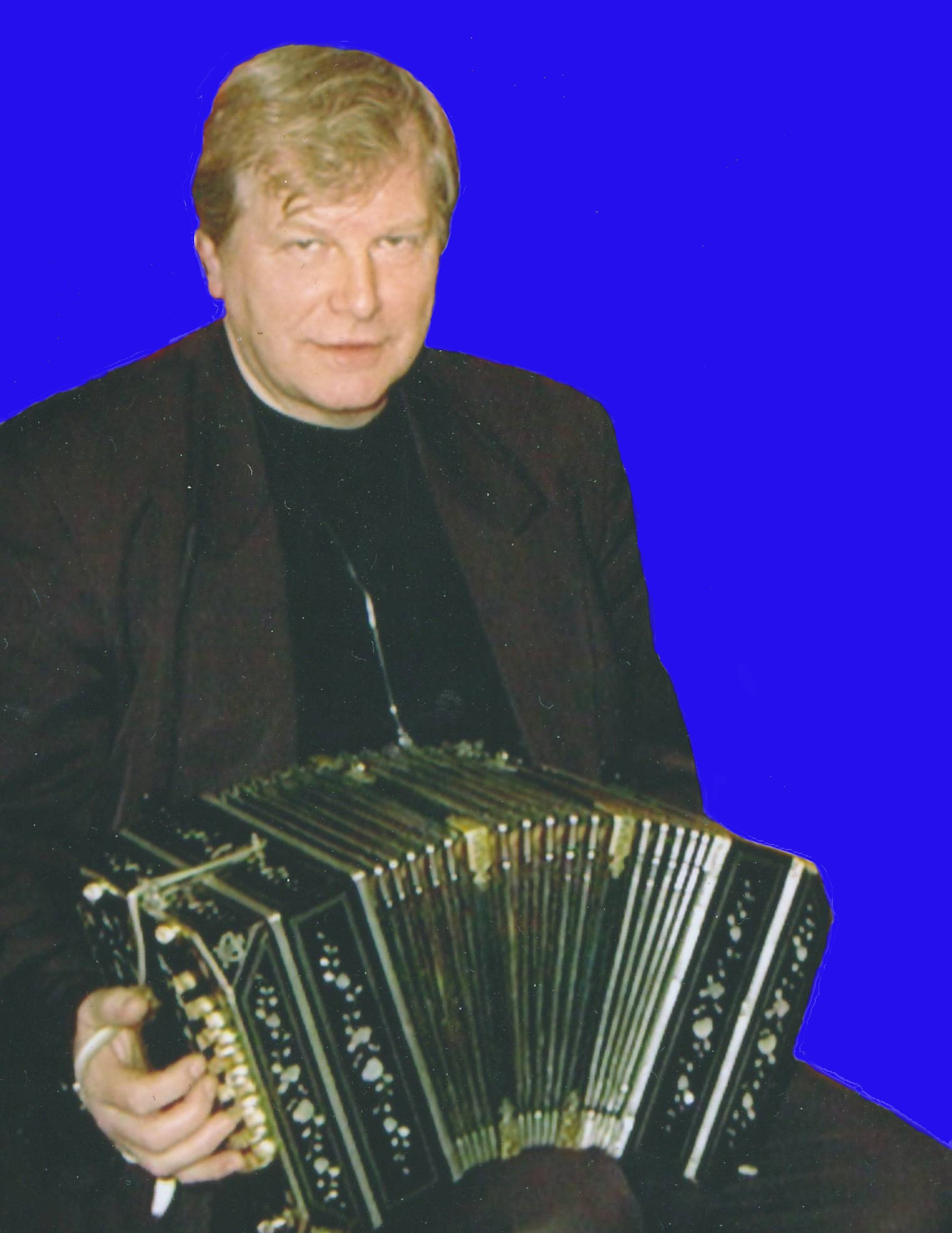
- Simonsen with his bandoneon

Background information
- Born: 26 March 1948 (age 77); Oppdal, Norway
- Origin: as Tango Concertino, Trio Troika
- Genres: Classical music Argentinian Tango; Contemporary music
- Occupations: Musician
- Instruments: bandoneon Accordion
- Years active: 1962 - present

Kåre Jostein Simonsen (born March 26, 1948) is a Norwegian bandoneonist. He has been a regular member of the Tango Concertino and Trio Troika in Trondheim, and now plays in ensembles Quinteto Nidaros (piazzollaquintet - bandoneon, violin, electric guitar, piano and double bass) and Cholo tango duet/trio.

== Biography ==
=== Education ===
Simonsen is basically self-taught musician from the early 60 - century with accordion as the main instrument. As early as 12 years old he accompanied Elisabeth Granneman on a show in Oppdal. In 1962 he formed, along with Harald Sæther on guitar and Harald Øiamo on percussion the dance orchestra Simonsens Trio. The trio disbanded in 1964.

In 1969 he started his musical education at the Veitvet Music Conservatory in Oslo accordion as the main instrument. After two years at this institution he continued his studies up to the musician / music teacher at the Trondheim Conservatory of Music in Trondheim until the spring of 1974. In 1996 he went to Paris to study bandoneon with Juan José Mosalini. This study took two years. Later, he has repeatedly been in Buenos Aires where he received further training for Néstor Marconi. In 2013, he took executive master's degree on the bandoneon at NTNU Trondheim Conservatory of Music. In recent years Simonsen has also regularly traveled to Rosario in Argentina to seek inspiration and delve deeper into the Latin American tango culture. His association with Rosario has always been the bandoneonist Rodolfo (Cholo) Montironi who has also been his tutor and contact in this environment.

=== Career ===
His main career as a music teacher, he has held in Trondheim municipal Culture School. At this institution he founded accordion group Bajan in 1979. Bajan participated in several competitions and won several 1st Prices in chamber music and entertainment music. Here he also built up the only provision that exists in the Nordic countries for the instrument bandoneon. One result of this is building up the tango orchestra Tangueros del norte, established by Simonsen in 2003, with students from Trondheim Municipal Music School. Simonsen was musical director for Tangueros del norte until 2008. Simonsen otherwise has given its name to all the ensembles he has been the initiator or co-creator of Tango Concertino (initiated by Sveinung Lillebjerka, Ørnulf Lillebjerka and Kåre Simonsen), Quinteto Nidaros, Trio Troika, Cholo Tango Duet / Trio and Tangueros Del Norte. After 2008, the ensemble stood on its own as ensemble. Norsk tipping and Norwegian culture school advice "Drømmestipendet" is awarded to students of Simonsen five times including Tangueros del norte.

Simonsen was in periods involved as musician at Trøndelag Teater and has participated in both radio - and television program. He has had performances with Oslo Philharmonic in Oslo, Trondheim Symphony Orchestra, Trondheim Soloists and the Nidaros Cathedral Choir in Trondheim, Norwegian Arctic Philharmonic Orchestra in Tromsø, Bodø Sinfonietta, Patriarch Choir of St. Basil in Bodø, Kristiansund Symphony Orchestra in Kristiansund and several smaller groups and ensembles. In 1994 he toured with Arja Saijonmaa in Finland, Sweden and Norway, in 2010 with the Swedish singer Lena Jinnegren with the tango concept Glow. The Composers Terje Bjørklund (Trondheim), Bertil Palmar Johansen (Trondheim) and Harald Sæther (Oppdal) has written music in commission to Simonsen.

== Discography ==
- LIVE in Olavshallen- Tango Concertino, Trondheim 1994
- LIVEin Olavshallen - Tango Concertino with Marthe Werring, Trondheim 1995 (Norwegian Gram 1996)
- Faces by Inger Lise Rypdal (KKV) published October 8, 2007 - instrumental musician
- Inspirationwith Tangueros del norte (Denstad REC PLAY FORWARD) 2008 - ensemble director and producer

== Concerting ==
- Tango Concertino with more than 60 concerts (1992–1996).
- Tour with Finnish singer Arja Saijomaa (Tango Concertino), 1994.
- Toccata rea (soloist), Lo que vendra (soloist), Double Concerto for guitar and bandoneon with String Orchestra in concert with the North-Trøndelag string orchestra, 2007
- Concert octet (string quartet, actor, bandoneon, guitar and double bass) 2007
- Kleine Dreigroschenmusik Kurt Weill, 2009
- Concert with Quinteto Nidaros and girls' choir, 2010
- Tour with the Swedish singer Lena Jinnegren in the tango concept Glow, 2010.
- Master's degree Concerto for Bendik Lund Haanshus with Quinteto Nidaros, 2010
- Bustekaillfestival, 2010
