= Malin Falch =

Norwegian comics reator

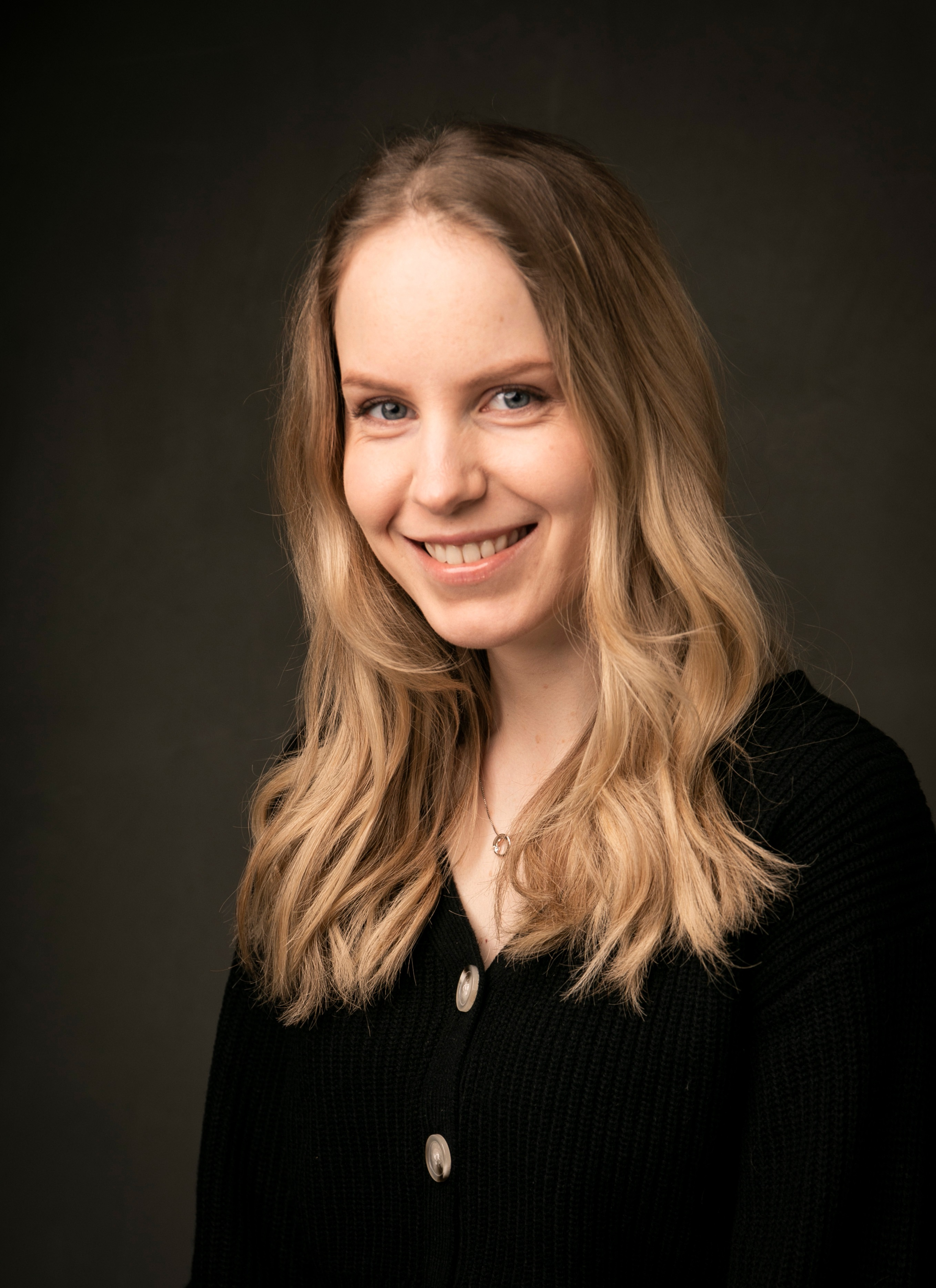
- Born: 6 January 1993 (age 33) Trondheim, Norway
- Areas: cartoonist, illustrator
- Notable works: Nordlys

Malin Falch (born 6 January 1993) is a Norwegian cartoonist and illustrator, known for the fantasy comics series Nordlys.

== Career ==
Born in Trondheim on 6 January 1993, Falch was educated at the Academy of Art University in San Francisco, California. During her studies she started publishing the web series comic strip Nordlys. After finishing her studies, she was employed by the American game development company Zynga for a time. In 2017 she moved to Oslo to develop the comic series further.

Her first book, Nordlys: Reisen til Jotundalen was issued in 2018, and earned her several awards, including the Norwegian awards Arks barnebokpris, Pondus-prisen and Barnas bokpris. The comic series has been sold to 13 countries as of 2022. Further books in the series are Nordlys bok 2: Vikingene og orakelet (2019), Nordlys bok 3: Kråkesøstrene (2020), and Nordlys bok 4: Trollriket (2021). A spin-off series, Bjørnar: En historie fra Nordlys, was awarded the Ministry of Culture's prize for best comic series for children and young adults in 2019. In 2022 she published two further books (book 5 and 6) in the series, Portaltreet part 1 and part 2.
