= Odd Frithjof Fladstad =

Norwegian politician

Odd Frithjof Fladstad (31 March 1907 – 1 May 1993) was a Norwegian farmer and politician for the Agrarian Party.

He was born in Rakkestad as a son of farmers. He had middle school education from 1923, and started working on the family farm. After attending the Nordic Folk High School in Geneva in 1935, he also worked as an auditor. He took over the family farm in 1940, the year his father died. He also chaired the sports club Rakkestad IF from 1929 to 1931, and subsequently became an honorary member.

Fladstad was a member of Rakkestad municipal council from 1934 to 1945, 1947 to 1951 and 1955 to 1975. He served the last eight years as mayor. Upon stepping down he was awarded the King's Medal of Merit in gold.

He served as a deputy representative to the Parliament of Norway from Østfold during the terms 1950–1953 and 1954–1957. In total he met during 127 days of parliamentary session. He chaired Rakkestad Agrarian Party, was secretary of Østfold Agrarian Party, and was a national board member of the Agrarian Party.

In the agrarian movement, he chaired the local and county branches of Bondeungdomslaget between 1935 and 1945. He was a district secretary in the Norwegian Agrarian Association from 1937 to 1947, and was also a national board member. He sat on the supervisory councils of Østfold Meieri (1947–1953, 1957–1962) and Norske Eggsentraler (1963–1967). He lastly chaired the board of the newspaper Nationen from 1973 to 1980.
