= Katrine Tjølsen =

Norwegian chess player (born 1993)

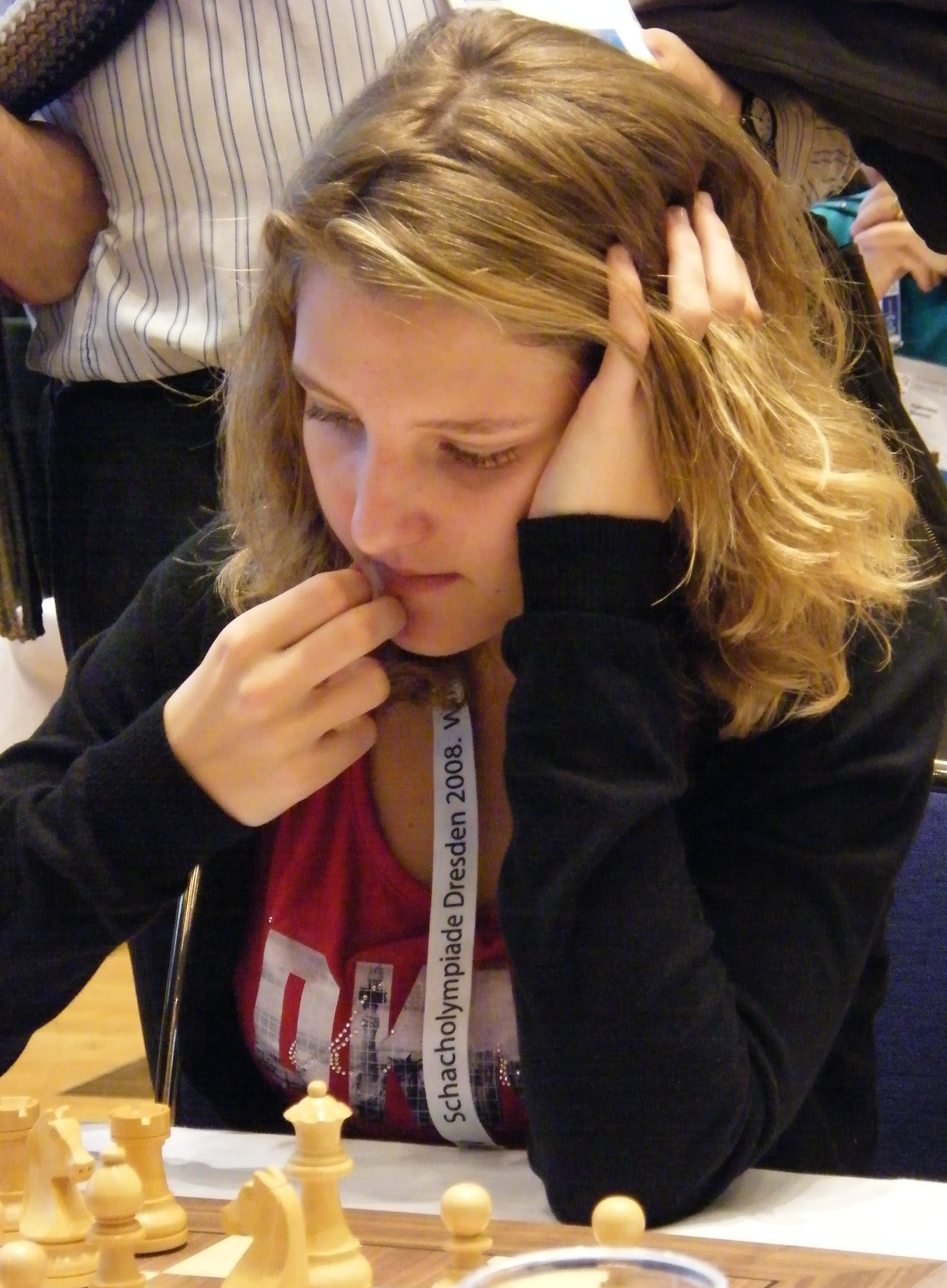
- Tjølsen at the 38th Chess Olympiad in Dresden 2008

Personal information
- Born: 28 January 1993 (age 33)

Chess career
- Country: Norway
- Title: Woman International Master (2010)
- Peak rating: 2259 (September 2010)

Katrine Tjølsen (born 1993) is a Norwegian chess player.

She achieved the title Woman FIDE Master in 2008, and was awarded the Woman International Master title in 2010. She represented Norway in the Women's Chess Olympiad in 2008 and 2010.

Tjølsen has been named as the model for investigator "Patricia Louise Borchmann" in a series of crime novels by Hans Olav Lahlum.
