= Per Tønseth =

Norwegian judge (1914–1993)

- Born: 1914
- Died: 9 November 1993 (aged 78–79)
- Occupation: Judge
- Known for: Justice of the Supreme Court of Norway
- Awards: Commander of the Order of St. Olav (1979)

Per Tønseth (1914 – 9 November 1993) was a Norwegian judge.

He grew up in Southern Norway, and took the cand.jur. degree in 1939. After a period as deputy judge he was an auxiliary judge in Follo from 1945 to 1949 and Eidsivating Court of Appeal from 1949 to 1950. Then, three years in the Ministry of Finance followed. From 1953 to 1961 he was district stipendiary magistrate in Vesterålen, and from 1961 to 1969 in Eiker, Modum and Sigdal District Court. From 1969 to his retirement in 1984 he served as a Supreme Court Justice.

He was decorated as a Commander of the Order of St. Olav in 1979. He resided in Drøbak. He died in November 1993.
