= Marie Spångberg Holth =

Norwegian physician (1865–1942)

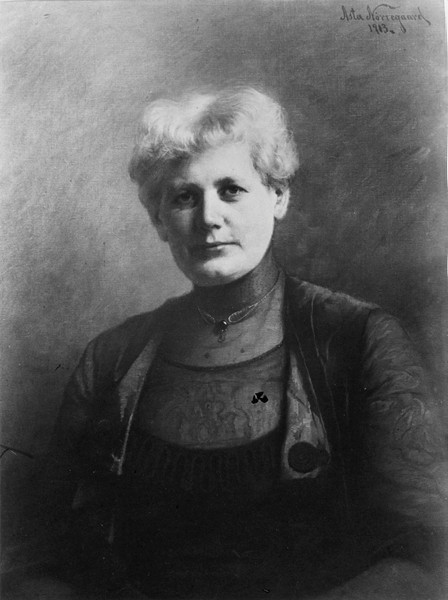
- Portrait of Holth by Asta Nørregaard, 1913
- Born: 23 November 1865
- Died: 23 November 1942 (aged 77)
- Years active: 1893-1920
- Spouse: Søren Holth
- Children: 5

Marie Spångberg (23 November 1865 – 23 November 1942) was the first female physician in Norway, after she graduated from the Royal Frederiks University of Christiania in 1893. She studied obstetrics and gynecology in Germany before returning to Oslo and opening a practice. She was appointed by the government to work in the Department of Venereal Diseases.

She was the daughter of a poor watchmaker's widow. Eventually she married

ophthalmologist Søren Holth and had five daughters, but two of them died at age one, and after that she gave up her practice. However, she continued to work in the Healthcare Commission until 1920, when she had to stop for health reasons.
