= Jakob Sigurd Holmgard =

Norwegian farmer and politician

Jakob Sigurd Holmgard (12 July 1929 – 24 December 2013) was a Norwegian farmer and politician for the Centre Party.

He served as a deputy representative to the Parliament of Norway from Rogaland during the terms 1977–1981 and 1981–1985. In total he attended during 128 days of parliamentary session.

He ran the farm Skitnadal near Skudeneshavn. He was a central board member of the Norwegian Agrarian Association from 1978, and then served as deputy leader for some years until 1988. He was a board member of Gjensidige Skade.
