= Norwegian Institute of Local History =

Norwegian library division

Norwegian Institute of Local History (Norwegian: Norsk lokalhistorisk institutt) is a division of the National Library of Norway. It was established in 1955 as an independent institute under the Norwegian Ministry of Culture and Church Affairs and became part of the National Library in 2017.

Its purpose is to “promote local and regional historical activity in Norway” both by carrying out its own research and by supporting independent researchers. It also runs the websites lokalhistorie.no, lokalhistoriewiki.no and historieblogg.no. Its current director is Dag Hundstad.
