= Norwegian Institute of Public Health =

Norwegian research institute

- Folkehelseinstituttet
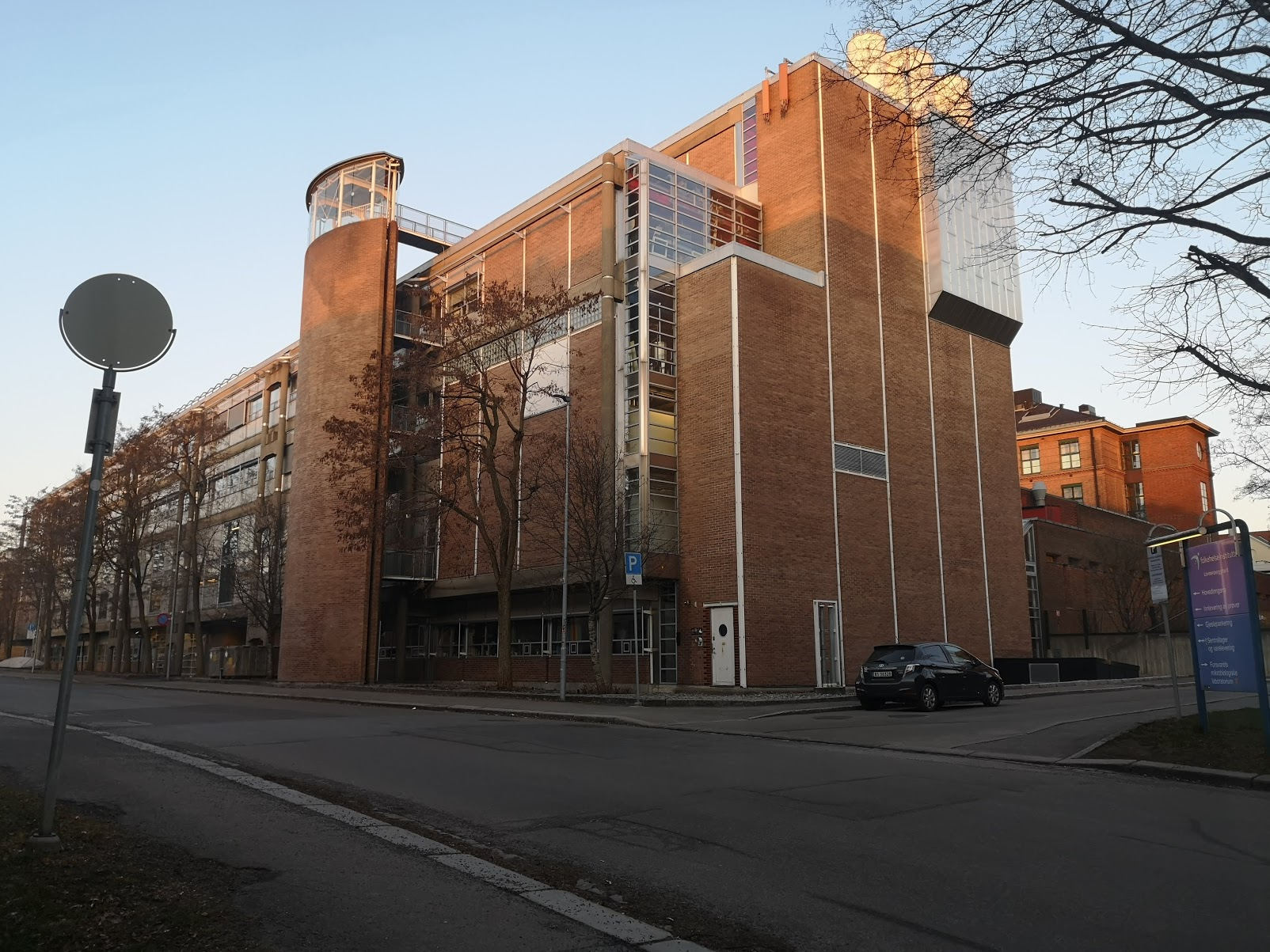

Agency overview
- Formed: 1929
- Headquarters: Oslo, Norway
- Employees: 1400 (2016)
- Annual budget: NOK 1500 million (2014)
- Agency executive: Camilla Stoltenberg, Director-General
- Parent agency: Ministry of Health and Care Services
- Website: www.fhi.no

The Norwegian Institute of Public Health (NIPH; Norwegian: Folkehelseinstituttet; FHI) is a Norwegian government agency and research institute, and is Norway's national public health institute. It is subordinate to the Ministry of Health and Care Services. NIPH acts as a national competence institution in public health in a broad sense for governmental authorities, the health service, the judiciary, prosecuting authorities, politicians, the media and the general public, international organisations and foreign governments. The institute has around 1400 employees.

The institute's main activities are health surveillance, research and prevention. The institute consists of research divisions for infection control and environmental health, mental and physical health, health data and digitalisation, and the Knowledge Centre for Public Health. From 2019 the Norwegian Centre for Violence and Traumatic Stress Studies also becomes part of NIPH. The institute has an extensive cooperation with the World Health Organization.

Camilla Stoltenberg served as director-general of the institute from 2012 to 2023, and Guri Rørtveit was appointed director general from 2024, for a period of six years.

== History ==
=== The fight against infectious diseases ===
The predecessor to today's institute, Statens institutt for folkehelse (SIFF), was founded in 1929 following a donation of 1 million Norwegian kroner from the Rockefeller Foundation. The first director was Einar Aaser. However, the idea of a public institute to address population health issues was born fifty years before and the notion of governmental responsibility for public preventive measures even earlier.

Initially, SIFF was responsible for providing vaccines and sera to the population and performing chemical analyses of water and food. Some years later, SIFF implemented immunisation programmes, but for several decades the scope of the institute was restricted to infectious disease control.

In the 1970s, SIFF established toxicology and epidemiology departments, focusing increasingly on prevention of non-contagious diseases as well as traditional infectious disease control. Health services research was incorporated in the 1980s.

=== Reorganisation and expansion ===
In 2002 and 2003, SIFF merged with several other institutions and units to form a new, comprehensive public health institute. The new institute was given responsibility for all health-related population registries, except the Cancer Registry of Norway. It would coordinate all public collection of epidemiological data in the country, as well as conduct forensic toxicology and drug abuse research.

The name changed from Statens institutt for folkehelse to Nasjonalt folkehelseinstitutt but the English name, Norwegian Institute of Public Health, remained the same. The new role as national co-ordinator in several fields emphasised the importance of co-operation with universities, hospitals and other research institutes and a series of national collaborating groups were formed.

In 2005 and 2006, the institute expanded its scope even further, targeting social inequalities in health and establishing a division for mental health. FHI also took on responsibility for the prevention of injury and disease caused by behavioural factors such as smoking, abuse of alcohol and illicit drugs, physical inactivity, obesity and unprotected sex with unknown partners.

The Norwegian Institute of Forensic Medicine was transferred from the University of Oslo to the Norwegian Institute of Public Health in 2011, but became part of Oslo University Hospital in 2017. The Norwegian Institute for Alcohol and Drug Research became part of the Norwegian Institute of Public Health in 2016. In 2019 the Norwegian Centre for Violence and Traumatic Stress Studies will be transferred from the University of Oslo to the Norwegian Institute of Public Health.

=== Size ===
In 1929, the institute had 18 employees, increasing to over 1400 in 2016. The annual budget increased from 107,000 to 1 billion Norwegian kroner in the same period. Even taking currency value increases into account, the 1929 budget was extremely low and most of the employees were volunteers. The considerable budget growth from 1929 to 2007 may be seen as a manifestation of the enormous changes in the national economy during this period. It may also reflect attitude changes and increasing awareness of effective preventive measures in relation to public health.

== Activities ==
The institute focuses on preparedness in the field of communicable diseases and environmental medicine, mental health, drug research, health, population studies, laboratory-based research and surveillance.FHI's activities adapt to diseases in the population and challenges in health care and society. Consequently, the NIPH will give special attention to the following areas; diseases of ageing, lifestyle and health, social inequalities in health, health surveillance and registries, as well as global health challenges.

== Organisation ==
The institute consists of scientific divisions for Infection Control and Environmental Health, Mental and Physical Health, Health Data and Digitalisation, and the Knowledge Centre for Public Health.Camilla Stoltenberg is the director-general of the institute.

== Registries ==
NIPH is responsible for the following health-related registers:

- Medical Birth Registry of Norway
- Norwegian Surveillance System for Communicable Diseases (MSIS)
- National Immunisation Registry (SYSVAK)
- Norwegian Cause of Death Register
- Norwegian Surveillance System for Infections in Hospitals (NOIS)
- Register for Induced Abortion
- Norwegian Prescription Database
- Norwegian Cardiovascular Disease Registry
- The Tuberculosis Registry
- Norwegian Surveillance System for Resistance Against Antibiotics in Microbes (NORM)
- Biobank Registry
- National Register of Adverse Effects from Cosmetic Products
- Food Allergy Register
- Waterworks Registry

== Cooperation with the World Health Organization ==
The Norwegian Institute of Public Health has an extensive cooperation with the World Health Organization within health surveillance, research, regulations concerning international public health and participation in committees. The institute hosts two WHO collaborating centres, several laboratories affiliated with the WHO and is responsible for Norway's participation in International Health Regulations processes. It also contributes expertise and personnel to WHO, and many of the institute's staff members serve on WHO committees. The institute also collaborated with Public Health Institute of Malawi.
