= Ingeborg Hoff =

Norwegian linguist

Ingeborg Hoff (November 15, 1911 – April 8, 1993) was a Norwegian linguist. In 1948, she was awarded the Doctor of Philosophy degree and hired as a Senior Archivist at the Norwegian Dialect Archive at the University of Oslo. She was promoted to the position of Docent from 1970 and made Head of the Norwegian Dialect Archive in 1972, positions she held until her retirement in 1981. A Festschrift in her honor was written on the occasion of her retirement.

Ingeborg Hoff collected some fairy tales; ATU 15+10***, ATU 327C, ATU 402 and ATU 480 in Hordaland in 1944, and ATU 41 in Sør-Trøndelag in 1961, which were all used as linguistic proficiency tests.

== Bibliography ==
- Hoff, Ingeborg. Skjetvemålet: utsyn over lydvoksteren i målet i Skiptvet i Østfold i jamføring med andre østfoldske mål. Jacob Dybwad, Oslo. 1946.
