= Osvald Harjo =

Norwegian resistance member

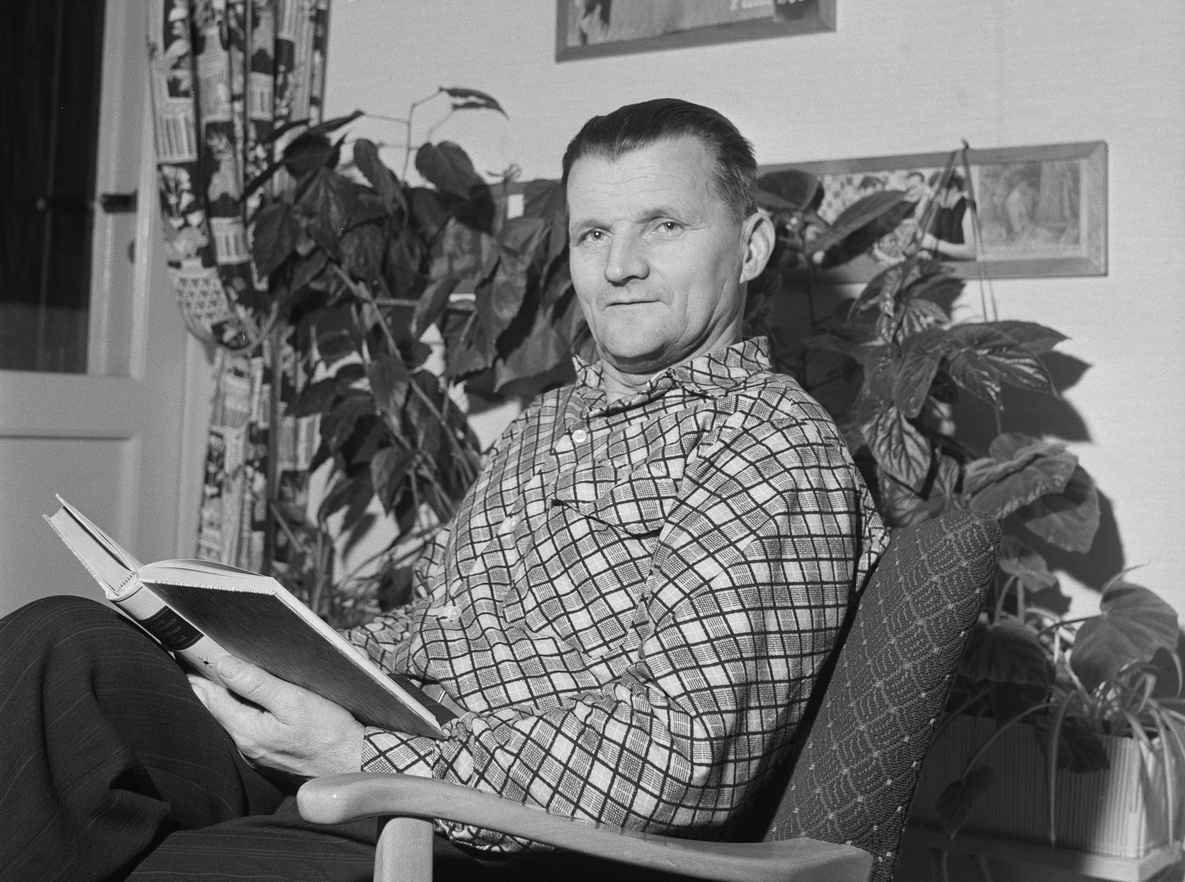
Osvald Harjo in 1958

Osvald Harjo (30 September 1910 – 20 April 1993) was a Norwegian resistance member during World War II, and a prisoner in Soviet Gulag camps for more than a decade.

After being arrested and tortured by the Gestapo in 1942, he managed to escape from custody and fled into the Soviet Union. Here, he was accused of being a German spy, and convicted to 15 years forced labour. He was released in 1955, after pressure from the Norwegian Prime Minister during a visit in Moscow. Paul Engstad wrote Harjo's memoir book Moskva kjenner ingen tårer (English: Moscow knows no tears) in 1956.

Harjo was of Finnish descent.
