= Knut Brinchmann-Hansen =

Norwegian judge and politician

Knut Brinchmann-Hansen (17 January 1911 – 9 March 1993) was a Norwegian judge and politician for the Conservative Party.

He was born in Vemundvik as a son of officer Olaf Brinchmann-Hansen (1877–1953) og Katie, née Galtung (1881–1954). After finishing his secondary education in 1929 and basic military training in 1930, he studied law and graduated with the cand.jur. degree from the Royal Frederick University in 1935. In 1939 he married Solveig Edith Hoem.

Following a time as junior solicitor and deputy judge, he mostly worked as a lawyer from 1939 to 1945. After the war he worked with the economic recovery of Norway, being based in Kristiansund. After working in a business position from 1954, Brinchmann-Hansen was a barrister again from 1958 and became district stipendiary magistrate of Sunnmøre District Court in 1966.

He was a member of the municipal council of Kristiansund Municipality from 1948 to 1951, and then again from 1956. He served as a deputy representative to the Parliament of Norway from Møre og Romsdal during the terms 1950–1953 and 1954–1957. In total he met during 116 days of parliamentary session.

In addition to sitting on the boards of local businesses, he was a consul for West Germany between 1958 and 1966, and was decorated with the Order of Merit of the Federal Republic of Germany.
