= Øyvind Bjørnson =

Norwegian historian (1950–2007)

Øyvind Bjørnson (1 January 1950 – 3 December 2007) was a Norwegian historian who specialized in labor history and the history of the welfare state.

== Biography ==
He was from Haugesund. He received his candidate in 1979, and later the dr.philos. degree in 1987 with the thesis Den nye arbeidsdagen. In 1990, he published På klassekampens grunn, volume two of the work Arbeiderbevegelsens historie i Norge, the history of the Norwegian workers' movement. He then covered the welfare state history with the books 100 år for bedre arbeidsmiljø, published in 1993 at the 100th anniversary of the Norwegian Labour Inspection Authority, and Langsomt ble landet et velferdssamfunn, published in 1994 together with his life partner and colleague Inger Elisabeth Haavet. His last work, Haugesund 1914–1950. Dei trødde sjøen published in 2004, was about his hometown, linked with broader global economic trends. He was a professor at the University of Bergen since 1993.

Bjørnson died in December 2007 following a long-term lung illness.
