= Gunvor Smolan =

Norwegian politician

Gunvor Smolan (8 July 1926 – 12 September 1993) was a Norwegian politician for the Labour Party.

She served as a deputy representative to the Parliament of Norway from Bergen during the term 1969–1973. In total she met during 2 days of parliamentary session.
