= Norwegian Institute for Alcohol and Drug Research =

Norwegian research institute

The Norwegian Institute for Alcohol and Drug Research (Norwegian: Statens institutt for rusmiddelforskning, SIRUS) was a social science research institute based in Oslo, Norway. On 1 January 2016 the institute was incorporated into the Norwegian Institute of Public Health.

It was established in 2001 as the result of the merger of the National Institute for Alcohol and Drug Research (SIFA) and a department within the Norwegian Directorate for Health and Social Affairs. Organizationally, it was subordinate to the Norwegian Ministry of Health and Care Services, but claimed to be independent. It was also a part of the European Monitoring Centre for Drugs and Drug Addiction.

In addition to various aspects of drugs, alcohol and tobacco use, it researched gambling addiction.
