= Hans Gaare =

Norwegian politician

Hans Gaare (28 July 1905 – 21 May 1993) was a Norwegian politician for the Christian Democratic Party.

He served as a deputy representative to the Parliament of Norway from Sør-Trøndelag during the terms 1961–1965, 1965–1969 and 1969–1973. In total he met during 7 days of parliamentary session.
