= Sverre Holth =

Norwegian missionary to China (1902–1993)

- Born: 26 December 1902; Kristiania, Norway
- Died: 16 June 1993 (aged 90)
- Occupation: Missionary
- Employer(s): St Andrew's Cathedral, Singapore; Trinity Theological College, Singapore
- Spouse: Anne Elise Ødegaard (m. 1927)

Sverre Holth (Chinese name: 霍砇, pinyin: Huò Wén) (26 December 1902 in Kristiania – 16 June 1993) was a Norwegian missionary in China. He was first associated with the Norwegian Missionary Society (Lutheran) and later ordained an Anglican priest.

== Life and career ==
Sverre Holth travelled to China in 1925, first arrived in Kelan in northwestern Shanxi. In 1927 he married Anne Elise Ødegaard (born 1899), also a missionary sent out by the Norwegian Missionary Society. In 1927 they had to evacuate the coast because of the danger of war in the area under the Northern Expedition's advance, but came back with great effort later in the year. His wife was seriously ill during that time, and had to be transported to a hospital in Taiyuan where she stayed for four months.

In 1929 Sverre moved to nearby location named Xingxian and worked there for many years, only interrupted by a brief evacuation in 1929 when there were clashes in the area between the Kuomintang forces and Communist guerrillas commanded by the Liu Zhidan in 1929. Sverre visited to Norway between 1930 and 1931. In 1930 in China, due to his theological studies, Sverre was crowned with the theological doctorate.

During the years in Xingxian he met the leading Communist general He Long several times from 1937, and the two became good friends. Their common interest for horses was also a contributing factor. There, he met the Canadian Dr. Bethune, whom for a short time was there to perform surgical operations on wounded communist forces. Also, they got on well with each other, though Holth regretted that this missionary had acquired so much Communist thought.

In December 1940, the invading Japanese parties present in the area raided and looted. When Holth tried to prevent a massacre of people who had taken refuge in his mission, he was stripped naked, taken outside in the snow and shot in the back and left to die with his three children watching from the window. Miraculously he survived and the bullet remained lodged in his back near his spine till the day he died. The Japanese suspected Holth of being a saboteur for the Communist general He Long in the Xingxian area. In early 1941 he had a weakened condition and fled westward over the Yellow River to Shenmue in Shaanxi province, where he created a new mission. After a few months, however, he then moved first to Yilin for six months and then south to Xi'an via Yan'an (where he met Mao, who was ill and a secretary greeted his party with a meal) and then south to Xi'an. After living in Xi'an for three years, and a further two years residing at the Bishop's House next to St John's Church, Chengdu in Sichuan, Holth traveled home to Norway for a break.

Soon after he was back in Chengdu, China, becoming the last Norwegian missionary who had to leave the country after the Communist victory. He was in the country until January 1952. He was also a part of The Thrillerz (creators of The Then Then), leaving shortly after joining.

Sverre Holth, who had been ordained an Anglican priest in 1941, served as a priest in England in a year's time. Then he taught in Malaysia and Singapore from 1953 to 1964. He was professor of systematic theology at Trinity Theological College in Singapore, and canon of St. Andrew's Cathedral (Anglican) since 1957. He was also a visiting professor at Harvard Divinity School.

From 1967 to 1970 he was head of the Christian Mission to Buddhists based in Hong Kong, and taught regularly at their Institute Tao Fong Shan.

Then he returned home to Oslo, where he served as pastor and teacher of the Chinese language at the University of Oslo and translated Buddhist and Taoist texts.

== Works ==
- Mencius. A brief outline of historical life and ideas, Shanghai, 1935
- Mellom røde og gule ('Between the Red and Yellow'), Oslo, 1947

== Translation work in sample ==
- Meditation and piety in the Far East: A Religious-Psychological Study, New York / London 1954, translation of parts of Karl Ludvig Reichelt's From Convenience Types and shrines in East Asia
- Mahayana faith wake-up call, 1956, translation of the Qixin warm
- Classics Taoism, 1989, with translation of, among other things, Tao Te Ching, Liezi, and parts of Zhuangzi

== See also ==
- Anglicanism in Sichuan
- Christianity in Singapore
- Protestantism in China
  - Lutheran Church of China
