= Tiril Bue =

Norwegian competitive sailor

Personal information
- Nationality: Norwegian
- Born: 26 April 1993 (age 33)

Sailing career
- Sport: Sailing
- Event: Laser Radial

Tiril Bue (born 26 April 1993) is a Norwegian competitive sailor.

She qualified for competing in the Laser Radial class at the 2016 Summer Olympics in Rio de Janeiro.
