= Yilin =

Yilin is a given name. Notable people with the name include:

- Fan Yilin (born 1999), Chinese artistic gymnast and uneven bars specialist
- Lin Yilin (born 1964), Chinese performance artist
- Tsai yilin (born 1980), Taiwanese singer, songwriter, and actress
- Wang Yilin (born 1956), Chinese business and oil magnate
- Wei Yilin (1277–1347), Chinese physician and surgeon
- Xie Yilin (born 1990), also known as Evonne Sie, Taiwanese actress
- Yang Yilin (born 1992), retired Chinese artistic gymnast
- Yao Yilin (1917–1994), Vice Premier of the People's Republic of China from 1979 to 1988
- Yin Yilin (born 1981), Singaporean blogger and activist
- Zhan Yilin (born 1989), Chinese football player
- Zhou Yilin (born 1992), Chinese competitive swimmer
- Yilin Zhong, British Chinese journalist, screenwriter and author

== See also ==
- Choo Yilin, Singapore-based fine jewelry company founded in 2009
- Jiaoshi Yilin, a Chinese book of divination composed during the Western Han Dynasty
- Yilin Press, an academic publishing house, a division of Phoenix Publishing & Media, Inc
