= Elizabeth Alexander (composer) =

American composer

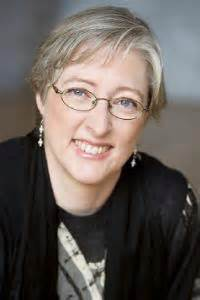

Background information
- Born: August 6, 1962 (age 64); Chester, South Carolina
- Occupation: Composer
- Years active: 1980–present
- Website: seafarerpress.com

Elizabeth Alexander (born August 6, 1962) is an American composer. Her works include orchestral, chamber, piano and vocal works. She is best known for her over 80 choral pieces, which have been performed internationally by thousands of choirs. Alexander is also known for her liturgical works, and themes centering on social justice.

== Biography ==
Sarah Elizabeth Alexander was born in South Carolina in 1962. After several years in South and North Carolina, her family moved to the Ohio River city of Portsmouth, Ohio in 1972. Trained as a classical pianist, Alexander studied composition with Jack Gallagher and received her Bachelor of Music in Composition from The College of Wooster in 1984. She received her doctorate in Music Composition from Cornell University in 1987, where she studied with noted composers Steven Stucky, Karel Husa, and Yehudi Wyner. She currently resides in St. Paul, Minnesota, and is one of the most performed composers in the Unitarian Universalist Musicians Network.

== Music ==
Choral music makes up the core of Alexander's works and performances, noted for her "accessible style that is well tailored to the requirements of both semi-pro and amateur choruses." Her style combines the regional influences from her childhood with classical form. These melodic sensibilities include spirituals, jazz and blues from the American South, and Celtic-American folk music of Northern Appalachia, styles prevalent in her most performed octavos, "When the Song of the Angels Is Stilled," "Where There Is Light in the Soul," "Faith Is the Bird That Feels the Light," and "If You Can Walk You Can Dance."

In 1992, Alexander's "Being Who You Are," written for Waunakee Elementary School in Waunakee, Wisconsin, won the KidSing Composer's Competition and was honorable mention in the John Lennon Songwriting Contest.

Alexander's "Reasons for the Perpetuation of Slavery" (2011) was performed at the Lincoln Center's Avery Fisher Hall in March, 2012, hailed as “brilliantly innovative” by the New York Concert Review. This work was instrumental in Alexander being named a Fellow to Minneapolis' McKnight Foundation in 2012.

Other awards and fellowships include the Jerome Foundation, New York Council on the Arts, Wisconsin Arts Board, National School Orchestral Association, International League of Women Composers, American Composers Forum, Meet the Composer and ASCAP. She was one of several composers interviewed and featured in Debra Spurgeon's Conducting Women’s Choirs: Strategies for Success.

== Discography ==
- "Fractals." Bassoon Transcended. Christin Schillinger, bassoon, and Jed Moss, piano. MSR Classics, 2013.
- Finally On My Way To Yes: Choral Music of Elizabeth Alexander. Various Artists. Seafarer Press, 2005.
- "My Aunt Gives Me a Clarinet Lesson." American Masters for the 21st Century. Society for New Music. Innova Recordings, 2005.
- "When the Song of the Angels Is Stilled." Creating Harmony: 30th Season Highlights & New World Waking! San Francisco Gay Men’s Chorus, 2008.
- "Where There Is Light in the Soul." Old, New, Borrowed, Q. One Voice Mixed Chorus, 2008.
- "Why I Pity the Woman Who Never Spills." No Whining, No Flowers. Cornell University Chorus, 2012.
