= Egil Borgen Johansen =

Norwegian archer (1934–1993)

- Born: March 14, 1934; Stavern, Vestfold
- Died: March 5, 1993 (aged 58)

Egil Borgen Johansen (14 March 1934 – 5 March 1993) was a Norwegian archer. He was born in Stavern (now part of Larvik Municipality). He competed in archery at the 1972 Summer Olympics in Munich.
