= Jostein Nyhamar =

- Born: 23 September 1922; Nedre Eiker, Norway
- Died: 30 July 1993 (aged 70); Bærum, Norway
- Occupations: Magazine editor, biographer and politician

Jostein Nyhamar (23 September 1922 – 30 July 1993) was a Norwegian magazine editor, biographer and politician for the Labour Party.

== Life and career ==
Jostein Nyhamar was born in Nedre Eiker on 23 September 1922.

He edited the weekly magazine Aktuell from 1959 to 1974, and Forbrukerrapporten from 1974 to 1986. He has written a biography of Einar Gerhardsen as well as volume six of the series Arbeiderbevegelsens historie i Norge, which covers the history of the Norwegian labour movement from 1965 to 1990. He also chaired Bærum Labour Party. He died on 30 July 1993 in Bærum.

== Selected works ==
- Politikk for fremtiden 1967
- Demokratisk sosialisme 1976
- Kjerringer mot strømmen og andre tanker, 1981
- Einar Gerhardsen, two volumes, 1982 and 1983
- Nye utfordringer (1965–1990), volume 6 of Arbeiderbevegelsens historie i Norge, 1990
- Med rødt blekk, 1992
