= Barrio (disambiguation) =

Barrio is a Spanish word for a district or neighborhood.

Barrio may also refer to:

- Barrio (surname), a family name and persons with it
- Barrio (Álava), a village in Álava, Valdegovia, Spain
- Barrio (Teverga), a civil parish of Teverga, Asturias, Spain
- Barrio (film), a 1998 Spanish film
- "Barrio" (song), a 2019 song by Mahmood

== See also ==
- Barrios, a family name and persons with it
- Barrios, Jujuy, Argentina, a municipality and village
