= Barrios =

Barrios is a Spanish surname. Notable people with the surname include:

- Agustín Barrios (1885–1944), Paraguayan guitarist and composer
- Ángel Barrios (1882–1964), Spanish guitarist and composer
- Arturo Barrios (born 1962), Mexican athlete
- Bayang Barrios (born 1968), Filipino musician
- Edison Barrios (born 1988), Venezuelan baseball player
- Eduardo Barrios (1884–1963), Chilean writer
- Gerardo Barrios (1813–1865), President of El Salvador 1859–1863
- Gonzalo Barrios (politician) (1902–1993), Venezuelan politician
- Gonzalo Barrios (gamer) (born 1995), Chilean-American Super Smash Bros. player
- Gracia Barrios (1927–2020), Chilean painter
- Ignacio Barrios (1930–2013), Mexican painter
- Jarrett Barrios (born 1969), American politician, President of the Gay & Lesbian Alliance Against Defamation (GLAAD)
- Jorge Barrios (footballer) (born 1961), Uruguayan footballer
- Jorge Rodrigo Barrios (born 1976), Argentine boxer
- Juan Luis Barrios (born 1983), Mexican athlete
- Justo Rufino Barrios (1835–1885), President of Guatemala 1873–1885
- Lucas Barrios (born 1984), Argentine-born Paraguayan footballer
- Lucho Barrios (1935–2010), Peruvian musician
- Luis Barrios (born 1990), Peruvian basketball player
- Lya Barrioz, Nicaraguan singer and actress whose real name is Ligia Barrios
- Manuel Barrios (born 1974), Panamanian baseball player
- Mario Barrios (born 1995), American boxer
- Morenito de Aranda Barrios (born 1985), Spanish bullfighter
- Selina Barrios (born 1993), American former professional boxer
- Sonny Barrios, Filipino basketball player
- Teófilo Barrios (born 1964), Paraguayan football player
- Yarelis Barrios (born 1983), Cuban discus thrower

== See also ==
- Barrio (surname)
