= Silvia Fernández =

Silvia Fernández may refer to:

- Silvia Fernández Barrio (born 1952), Argentine broadcast journalist
- Silvia Fernández de Gurmendi (born 1954), Argentine jurist, judge on the International Criminal Court
- Silvia Fernández Martínez (born 1984), Mexican politician
