= Senator Berríos =

Senator Berríos may refer to:

- Carmen Berríos (fl. 1990s–2000s), Senate of Puerto Rico
- Rubén Berríos (born 1939), Senate of Puerto Rico
