= The Valley of Mexico =

1877 painting by José María Velasco

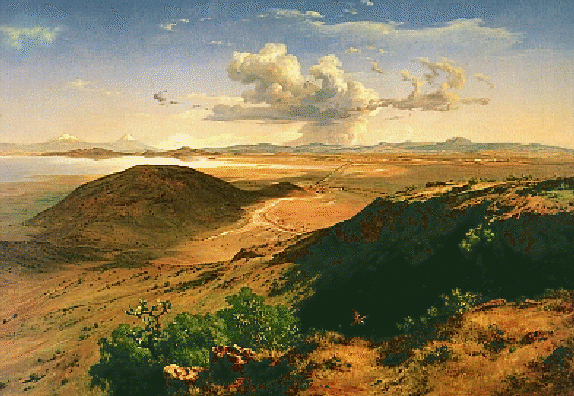
Valle de México, by José Maria Velasco, oil on canvas, 160 × 229 cm., Museo Nacional de Arte, México

The Valley of Mexico is an 1877 oil on canvas painting by the Mexican painter José María Velasco (1840–1912). One of the earliest landscape paintings in Mexican art, it caused controversy for its use of naturalistic and landscape techniques to create a photographic illusion, rare at that time. It shows Mexico City and the Popocatépetl and Iztaccíhuatl volcanoes, all symbols of Mexico and is now in the Museo Nacional de Arte in Mexico City.

== History ==
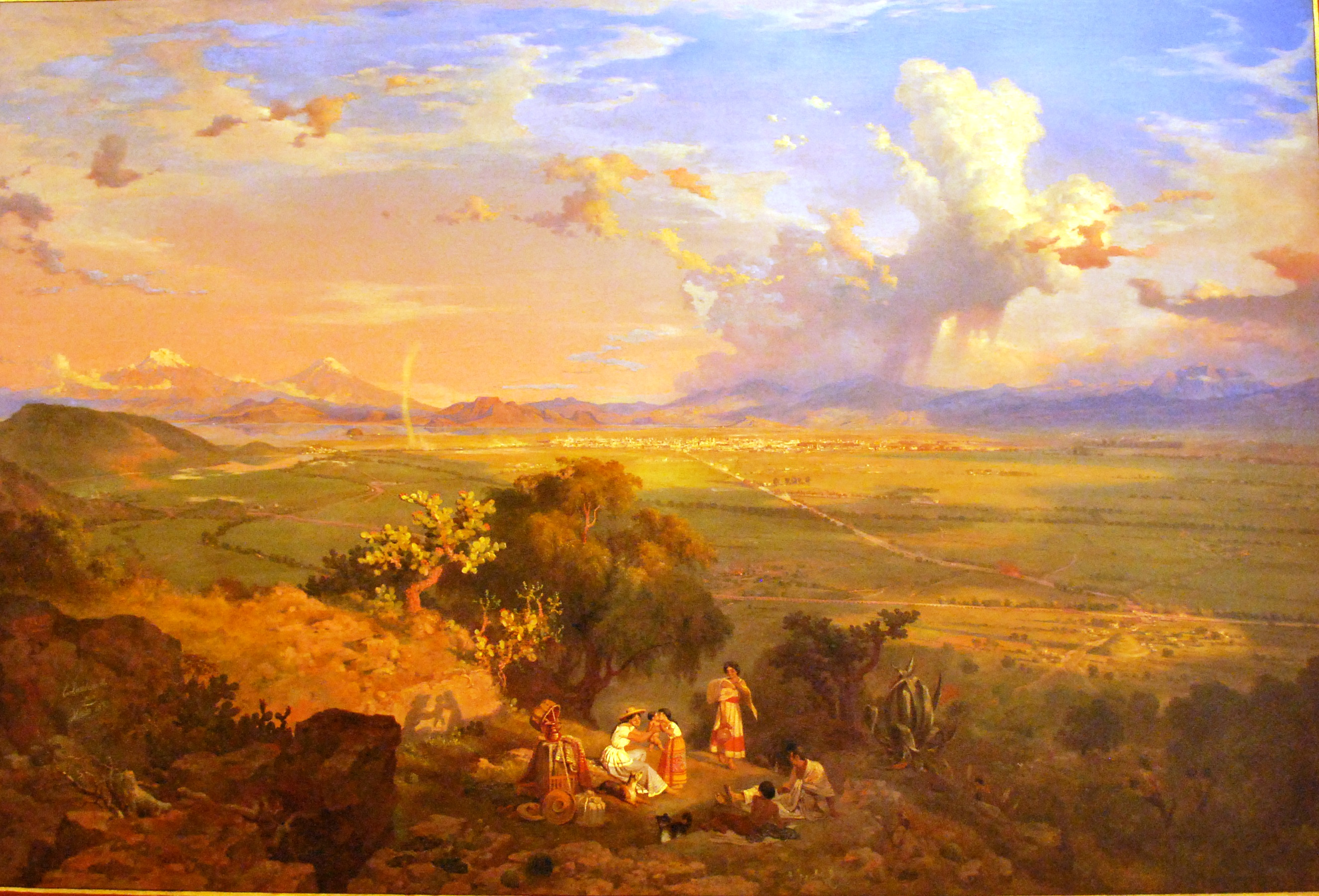
The Valley of Mexico from Tenayo hill, 1870, by the artist's tutor Eugeno Landesio

Velasco's Italian teacher Eugenio Landesio painted The Valley of Mexico from Tenayo hill in 1870, from a different hill but still an inspiration for Velasco's work. Velasco was still an apprentice while that work was painted and over time he improved his technique - Velasco's painting of the Valley is celebrated as being more realistic than Landesio's.

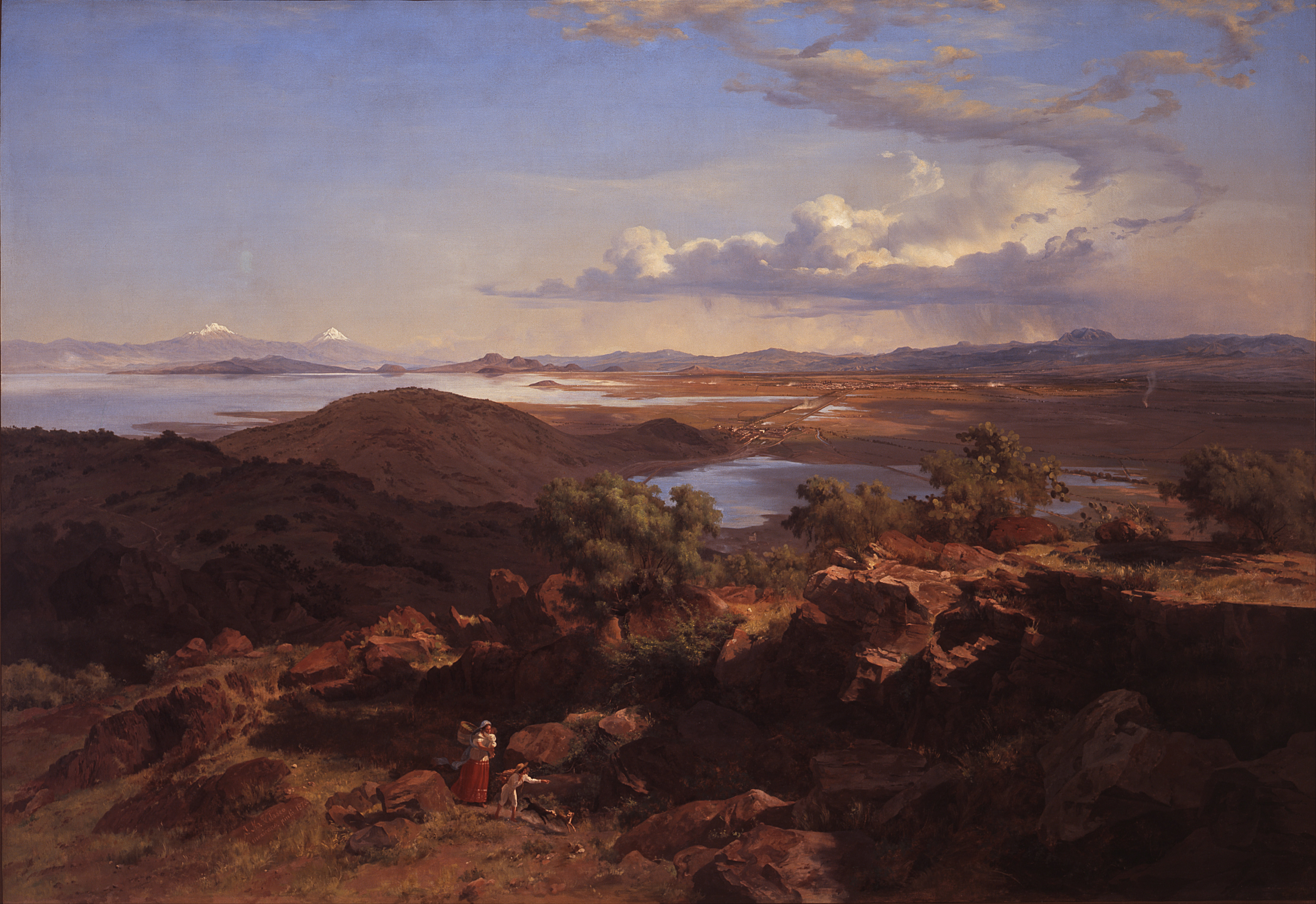
The Valley of Mexico from Santa Isabel hill, 1875

Having produced an 1875 version of the view, the painter carried out a series of scientific and botanical investigations of flora, fauna and cloud formations to produce the painting, wanting it to be his masterpiece and to capture nature's anatomy through it - this led to his paintings being used as illustrations in scientific journals thanks to their exact and accurate reproduction of species, something achieved by few other painters at that time.

To produce it he took a trip up the sierra de Guadalupe and - on reaching santa Isabel hill - began to produce the work. He replaces the indigenous women and children in his 1875 work with an eagle flying as it devours its prey. This painting marks his independence as an artist as his representative landscape style takes shape, thanks to the work's transparency and greater realism. In Landesio's painting and Velasco's of 1875 the reddish tones stand out, but in the 1877 version he decides to be more realistic.
