= José María Velasco Gómez =

Mexican polymath and artist (1840–1912)

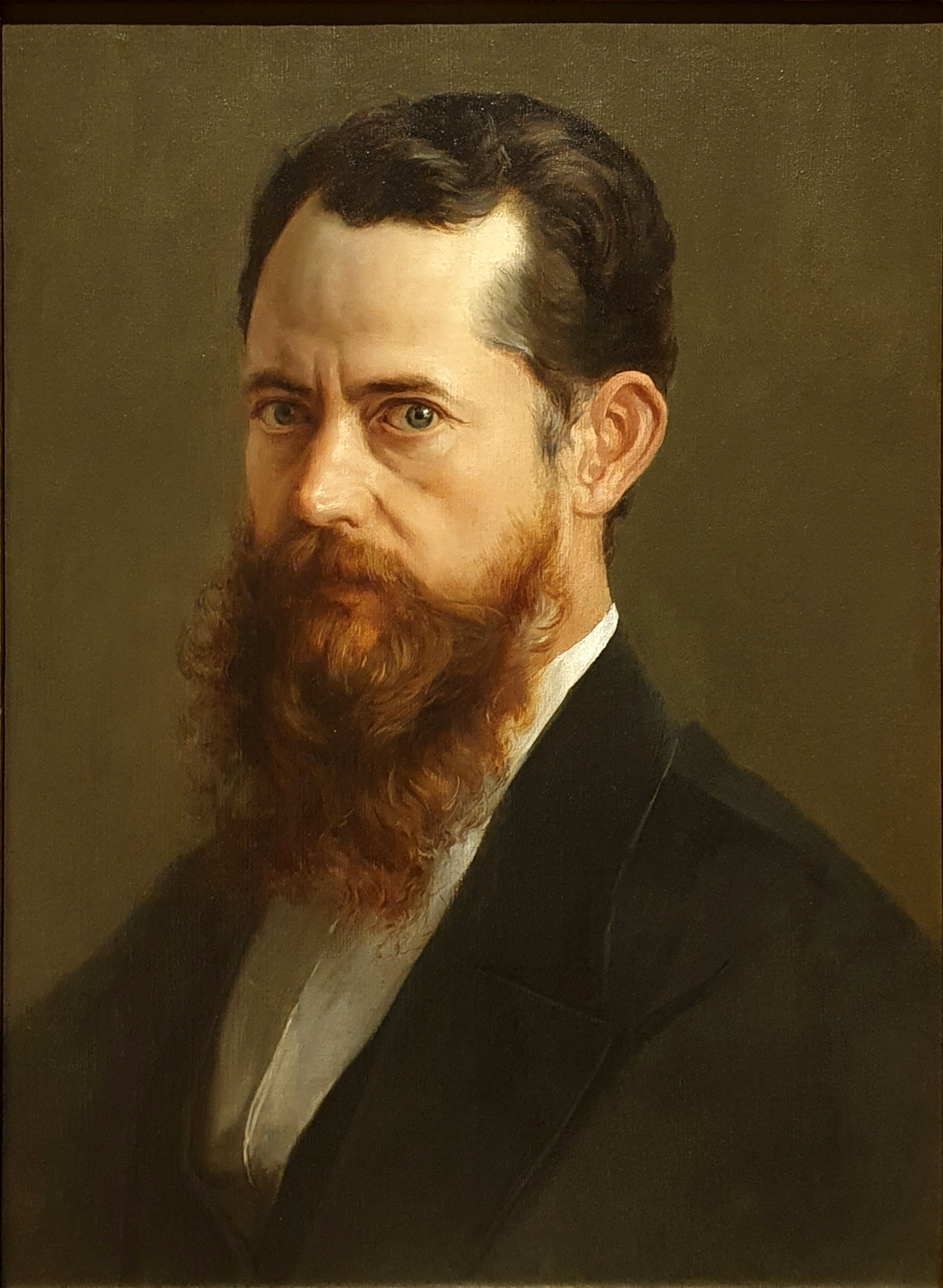
- Self-Portrait, 1894, Museo Nacional de Arte
- Born: José María Tranquilino Francisco de Jesús Velasco Gómez Obregón; 6 July 1840; Temascalcingo, Mexico Department, Centralist Republic of Mexico
- Died: 26 August 1912 (aged 72); Villa de Guadalupe, Mexico City, Mexico
- Education: Academy of San Carlos
- Known for: Painting, landscapes and portraits
- Notable work: El valle de México

José María Tranquilino Francisco de Jesús Velasco Gómez Obregón, generally known as José María Velasco, (6 July 1840 – 26 August 1912) was a 19th-century Mexican polymath, most famous as a painter who made Mexican geography a symbol of national identity through his paintings. He was both one of the most popular artists of the time and internationally renowned. He received many distinctions such as the gold medal of the Mexican National Expositions of Bellas Artes in 1874 and 1876; the gold medal of the Philadelphia International Exposition in 1876, on the centenary of U.S. independence; and the medal of the Paris Universal Exposition in 1889, on the centenary of the outbreak of the French Revolution. His painting El valle de México is considered Velasco's masterpiece, of which he created seven different renditions. Of all the nineteenth-century painters, Velasco was the "first to be elevated in the post-Revolutionary period as an exemplar of nationalism."

== Career ==
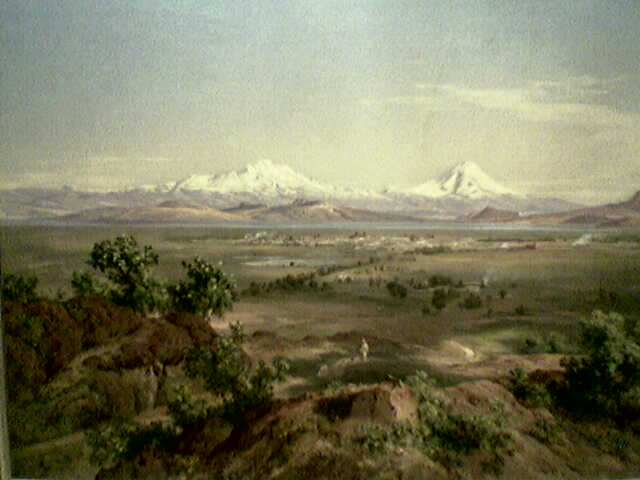
El Valle de México, s. XIX

Velasco was born in Temascalcingo. He studied art at the Academy of San Carlos under the professor of landscape, Italian Eugenio Landesio, who began teaching at the academy in 1855. Landesio raised landscape painting in Mexico to high art, and articulated theories of composition that he implemented in his landscapes. Velasco is his most famous pupil, who following his mentor's departure in 1877, dominated Mexican landscape painting and gained an international reputation, whose works became part of collections in the U.S.

Velasco's production can be classified into three periods: The academic years, from 1860 to 1889, that include La Plaza de San Jacinto en San Ángel, Las montañas de la Magadalena, La Alameda de México, El bosque de Jalapa, El Cedro de Chimalistac and El Ahuehuete de Chapultepec.

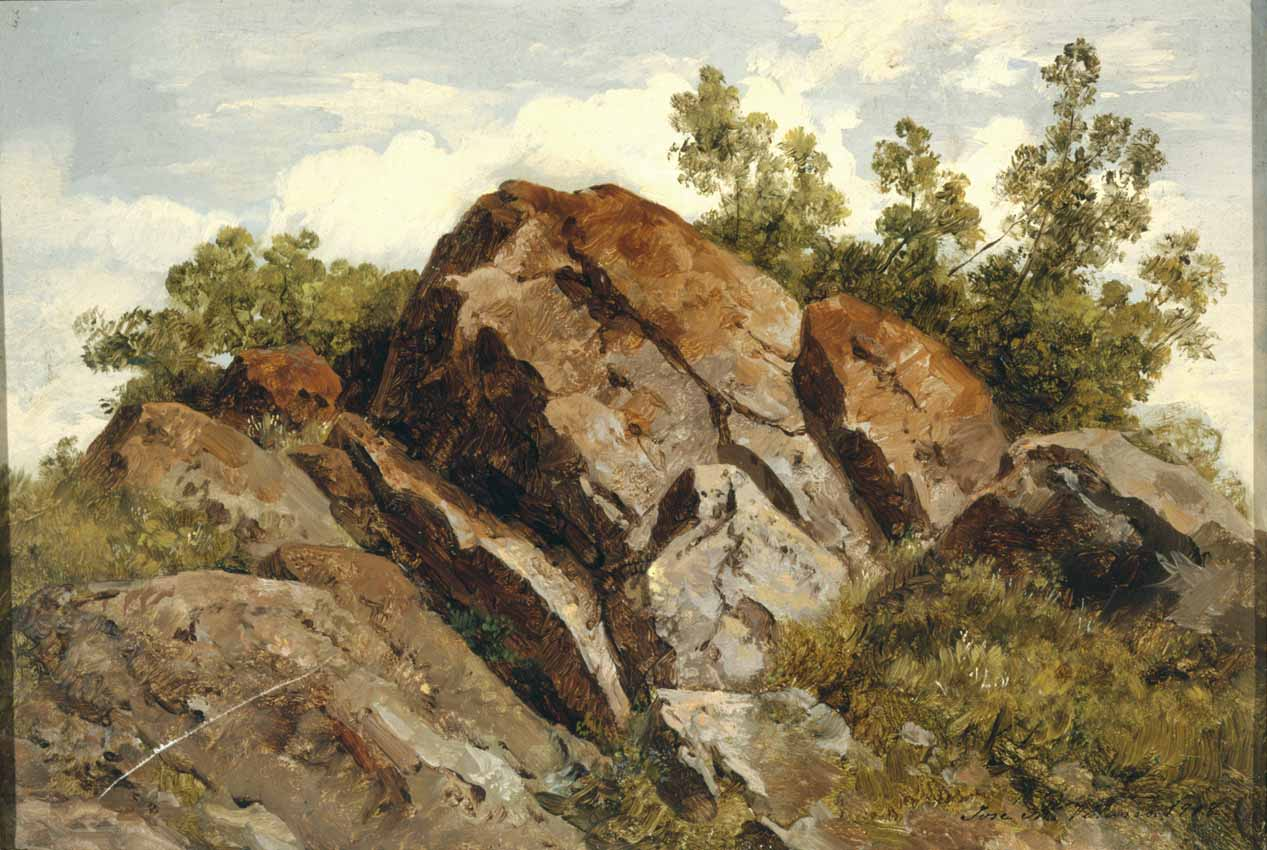
José María Velasco - Rochas, sem data at the Museo Soumaya

The period from 1890 to 1892, when he was in touch with French Impressionists, that includes Valle de Mexico desde el cerro de Atraeualco and Ajusco visto desde el Tepeyac.

Finally, a personal period from 1892 to 1912, Rocas del cerro de Atzacoalco, Pirámide del Sol en Teotihuacán, Popocatepetl, Ixtlaciual, Templo de San Bernardo, Cascada de Necaxa and El Puente de Metlac.

Velasco served as a Commissioner for Fine Arts for the Mexican delegation to the 1893 World's Columbian Exposition in Chicago, where he exhibited seventeen of his own oil paintings.

Velasco was interested in science, and, as a student at the Academy of San Carlos studied zoology and botany at the nearby medical school; he also studied mathematics, geology, and surveying before becoming a student of painting. In 1879, he described a new species of Ambystoma found in the Santa Isabel lake, north of Mexico City, and published his observations in the Mexican scientific journal La Naturaleza (La Naturaleza 4: 216). The new species was named by Velasco Siredon Tigrina. In 1888 Alfredo Dugès (1826–1910) renamed the species and dedicated it to Velasco as Ambystoma velasci (see also Plateau Tiger Salamander).

Velasco died in 1912 in Villa de Guadalupe, Mexico City.

In 1997, botanists Calderón & Rzed. published Velascoa, which is a monotypic genus of flowering plants from north-eastern Mexico belonging to the family Crossosomataceae. It also was named in José María Velasco Gómez's honour.

== Legacy ==
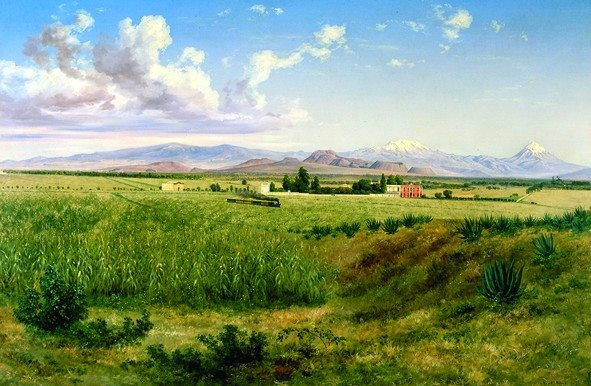
Hacienda of San Antonio Coapa by José María Velasco Gómez

Velasco's long career elevated Mexican landscape painting to international standing. One of his landscapes of the Valley of Mexico is in the Vatican Museum, a gift to Pope Leo XIII. His scenes of the Mexican landscape are a visual source for environmental historians, since they show the Valley of Mexico before its degradation in the twentieth century, with air pollution and urban sprawl. His landscape art has a wide appeal, since it is more accessible than history paintings that require the viewer to understand a particular event.

Today the Government of the State of Mexico, where Velasco was from, presents an award for artistic merit in his name to painters born in that state. Among the most outstanding winners are Luis Nishizawa, Leopoldo Flores, Ignacio Barrios and Héctor Cruz.

The José María Velasco Museum was opened in 1992 in Toluca with the task of preserving and promoting his paintings.

From March 29 - August 17, 2025, the National Gallery, London exhibited José María Velasco: A View of Mexico, the first show dedicated to his work in the United Kingdom. The exhibit was organized by the National Gallery and the Minneapolis Institute of Art (exhibited September 27, 2025 - January 4, 2026). The catalog was written by Dexter Dalwood and Daniel Sobrino Ralston (ISBN ISBN 978-1-857-09725-2)

== Gallery ==
Studies

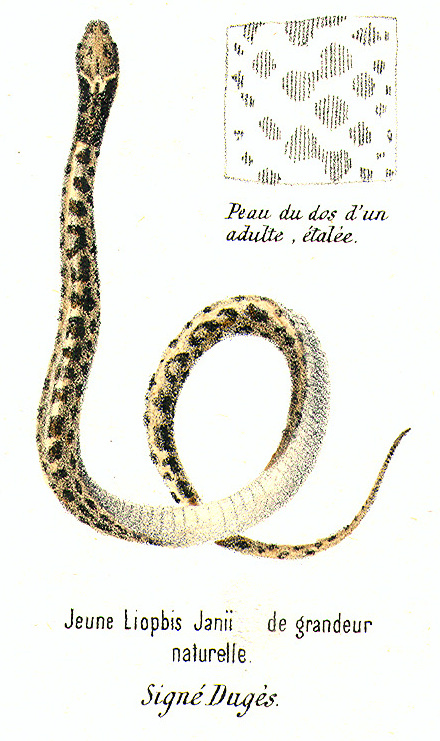
Study of a viper

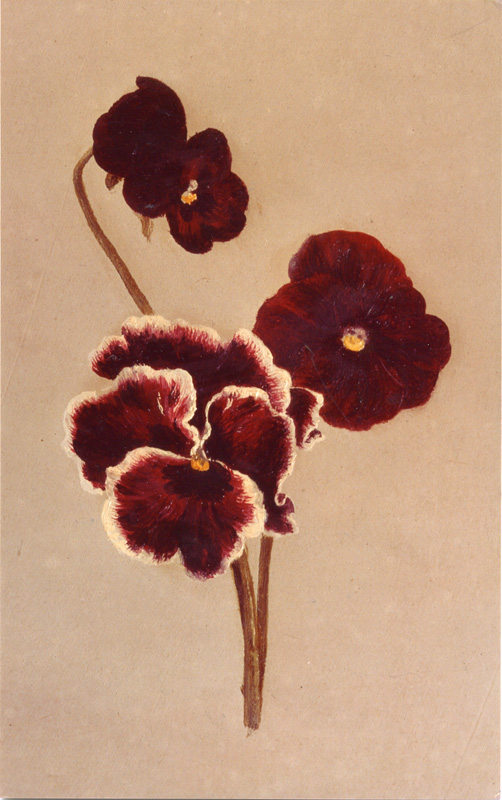
Study of pansies

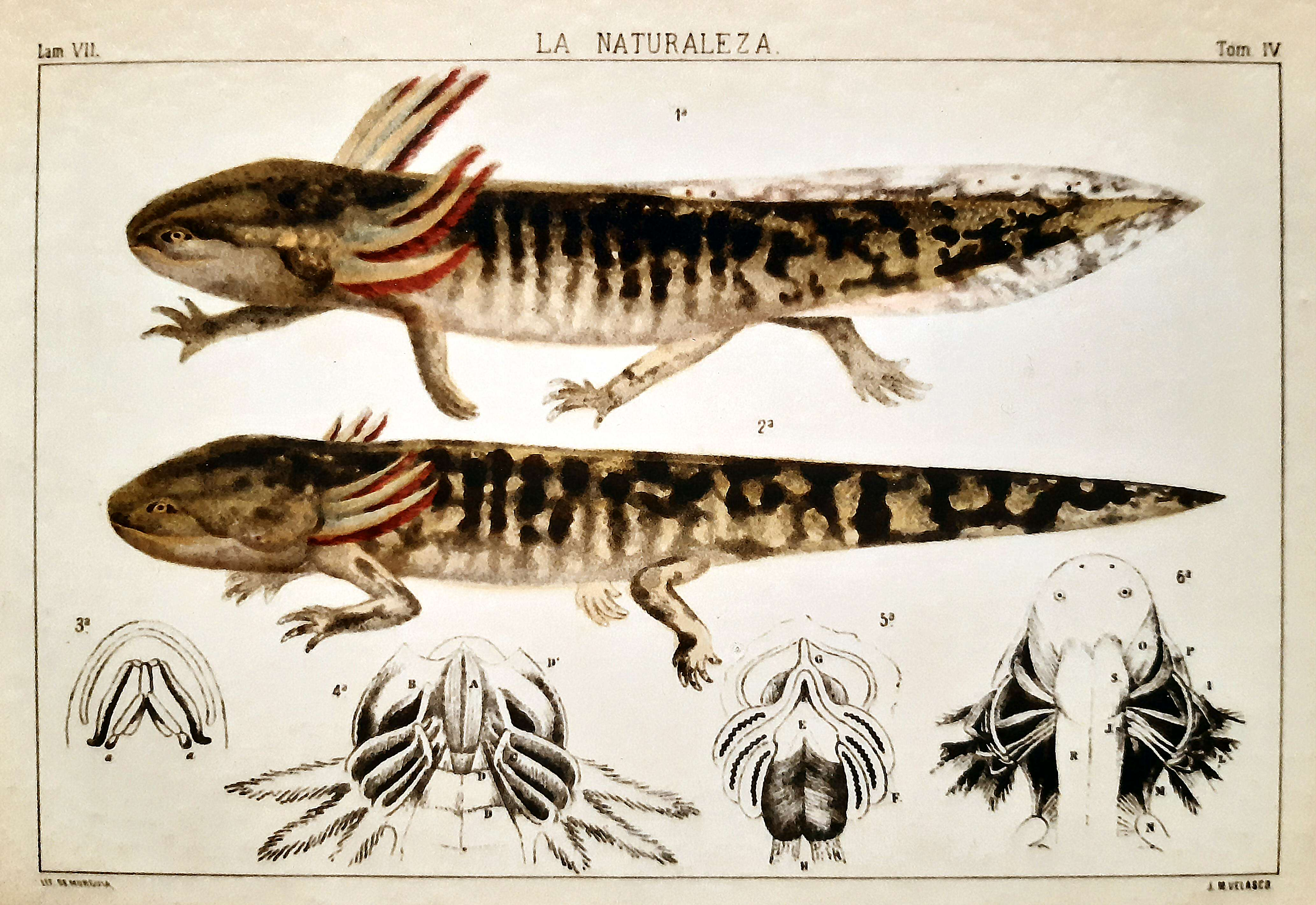
Study of Axolotl, 1879
The Valley of Mexico, 1877

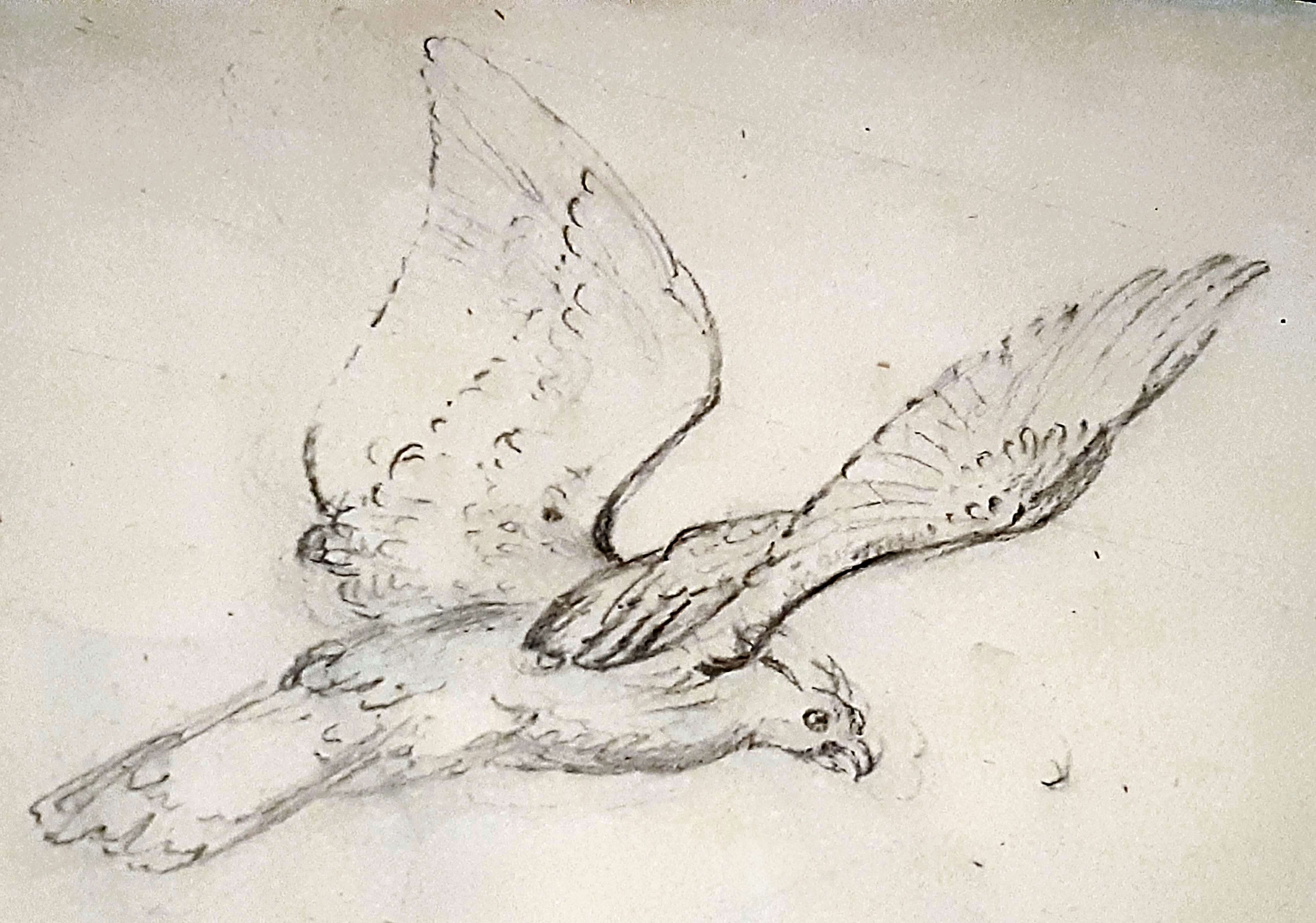
Study of harpy eagle for the painting

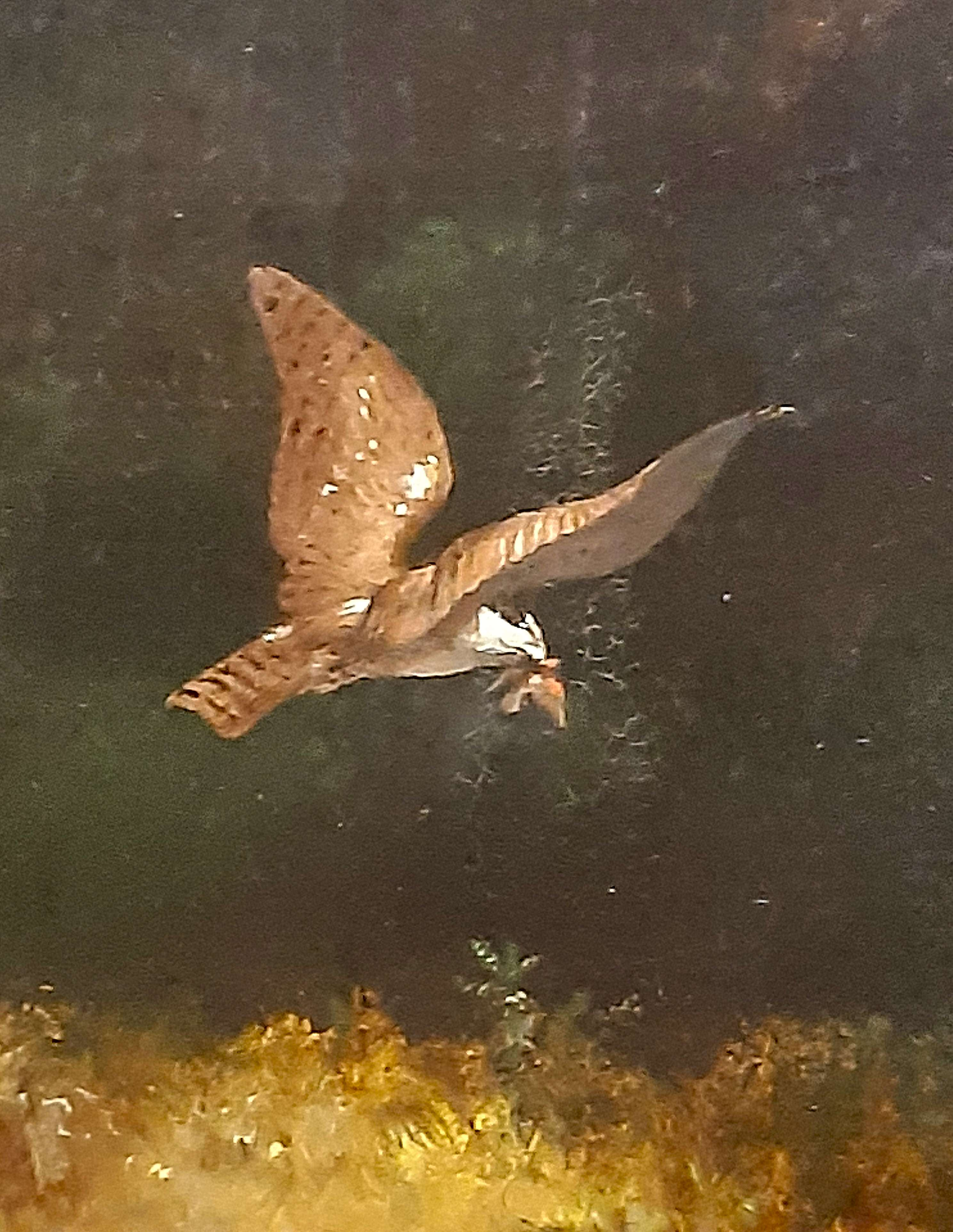
Detail of harpy eagle in the painting

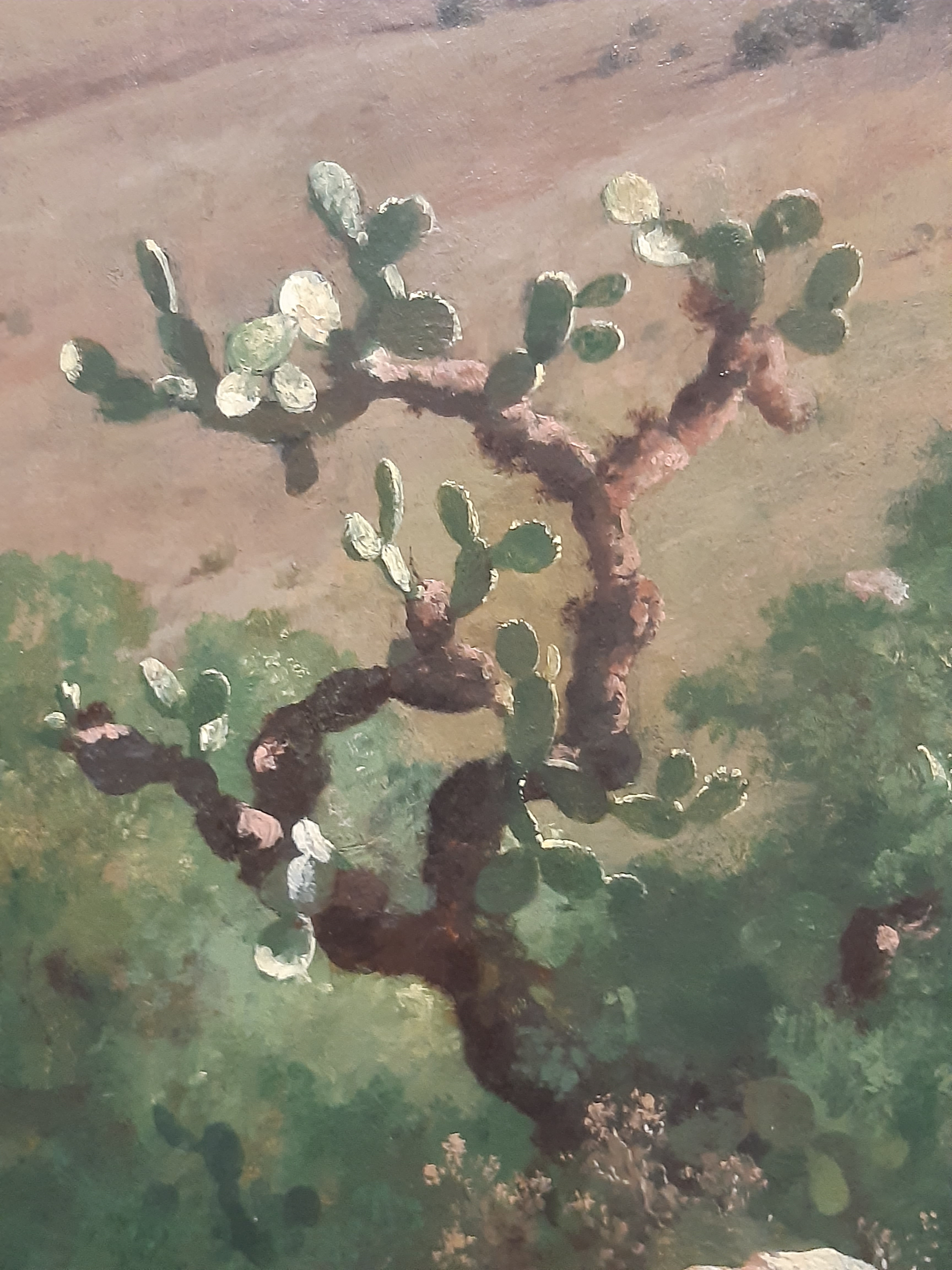
Detail of Nopal prickly pear cactus in the painting

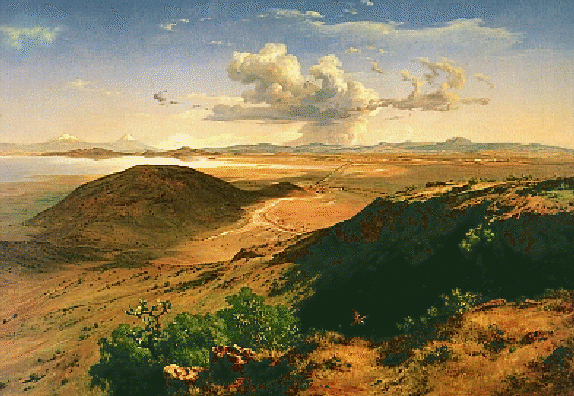
The finished painting

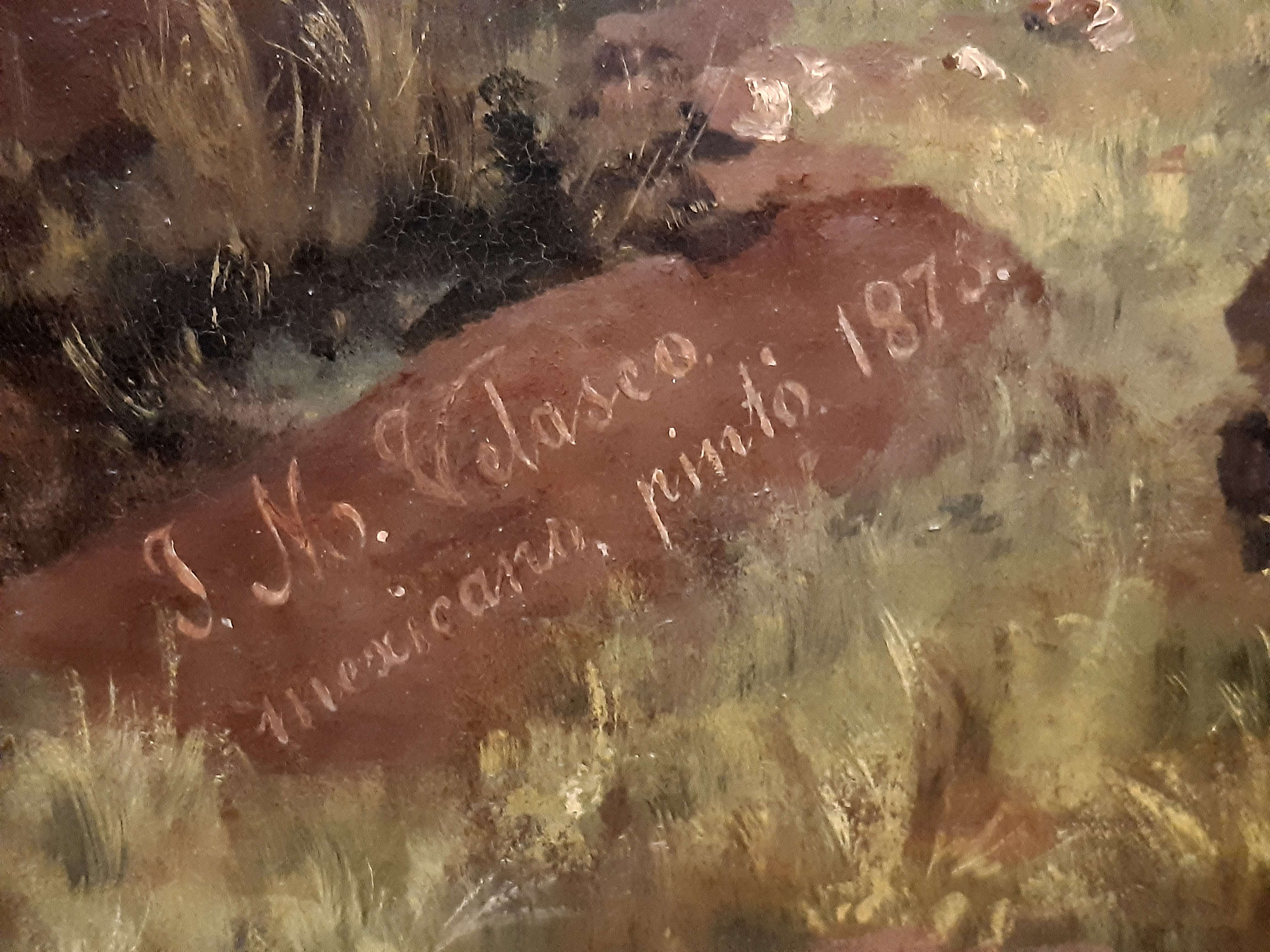
Velasco's signature on a rock in the painting
Paintings

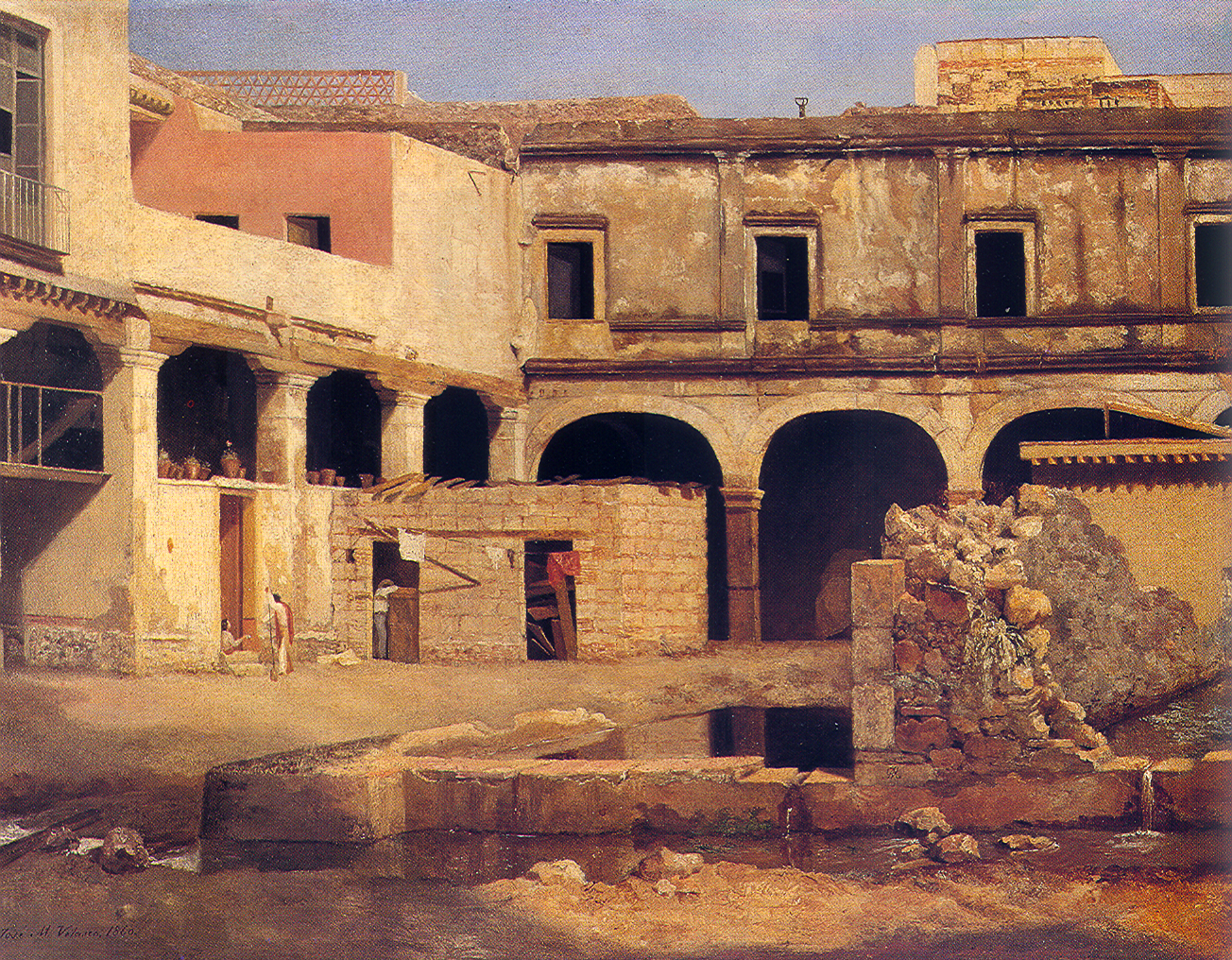
Courtyard of the former convent of San Agustín

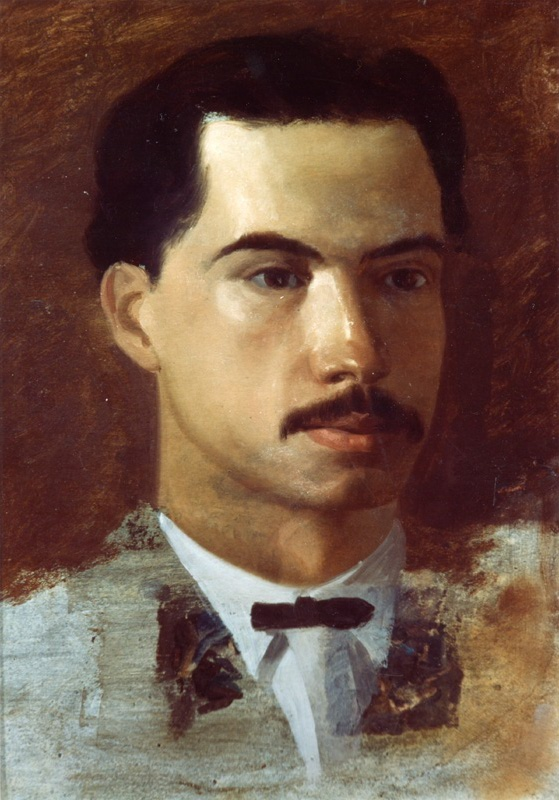
The sculptor Felipe Sojo

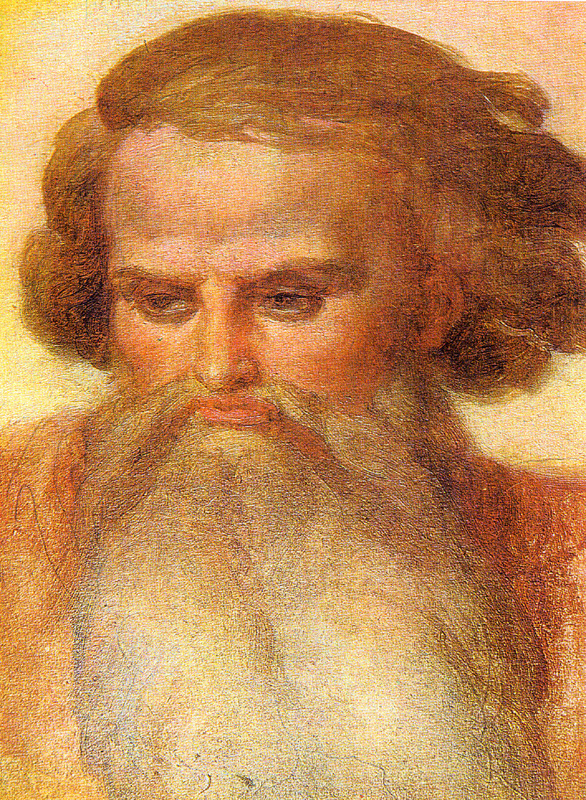
God the Father

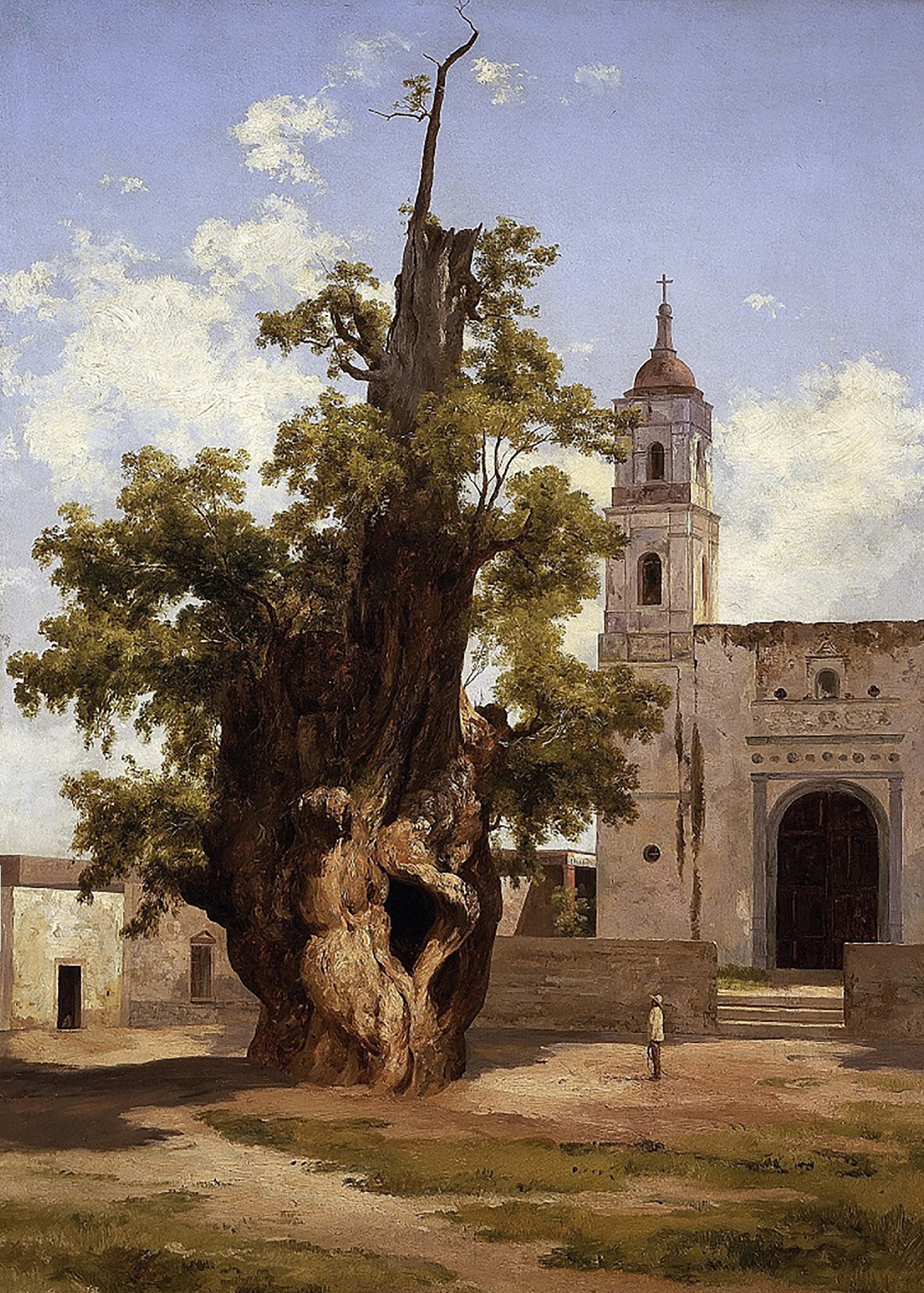
Ahuehuete of La Noche Triste

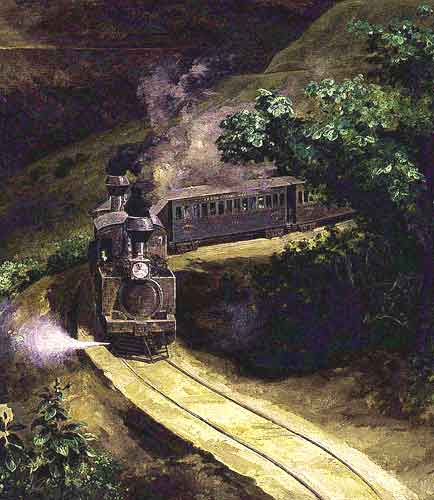
Ferrocarril

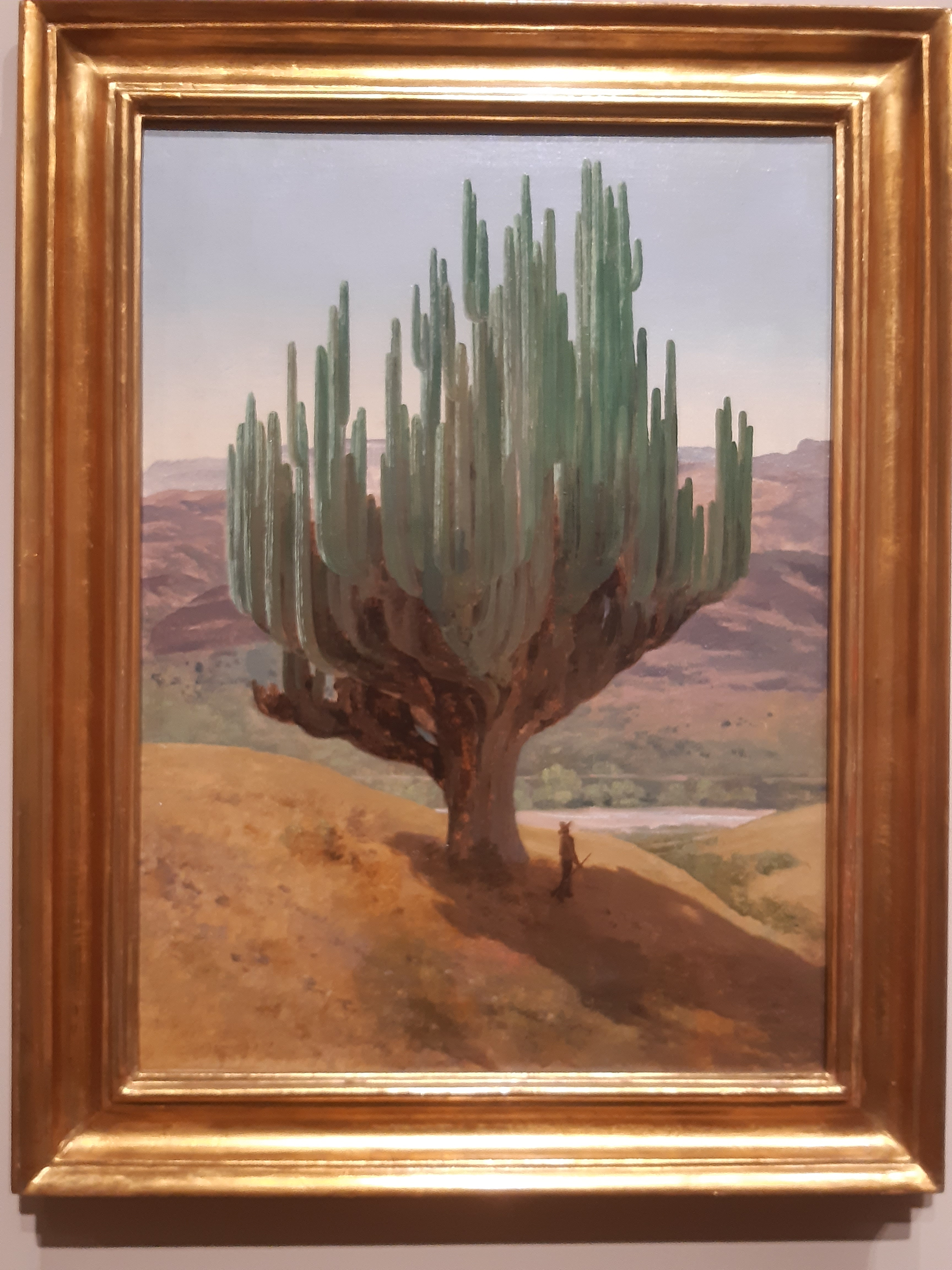
Cardon cactus, 1887

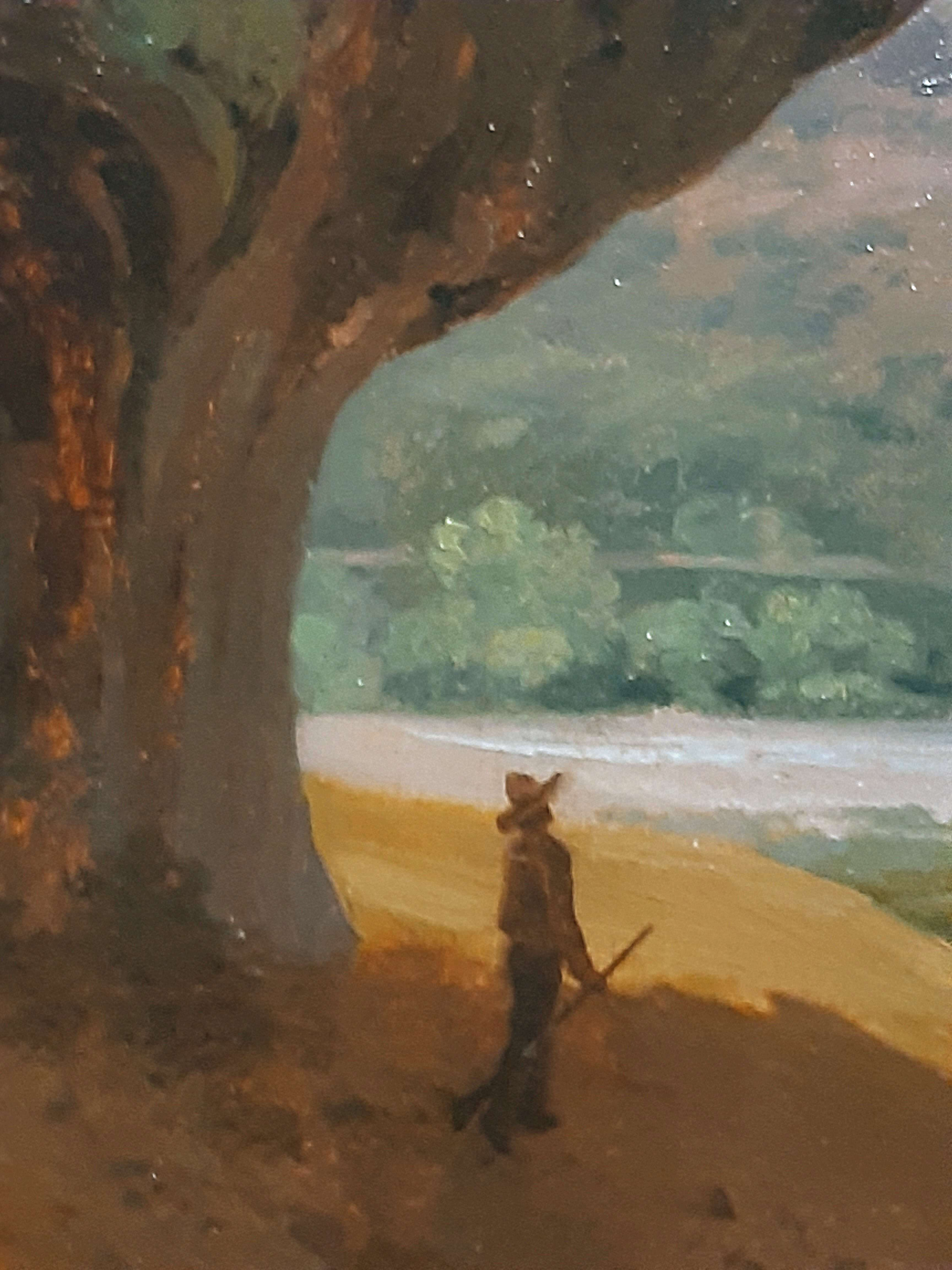
Detail in painting of Cardon cactus

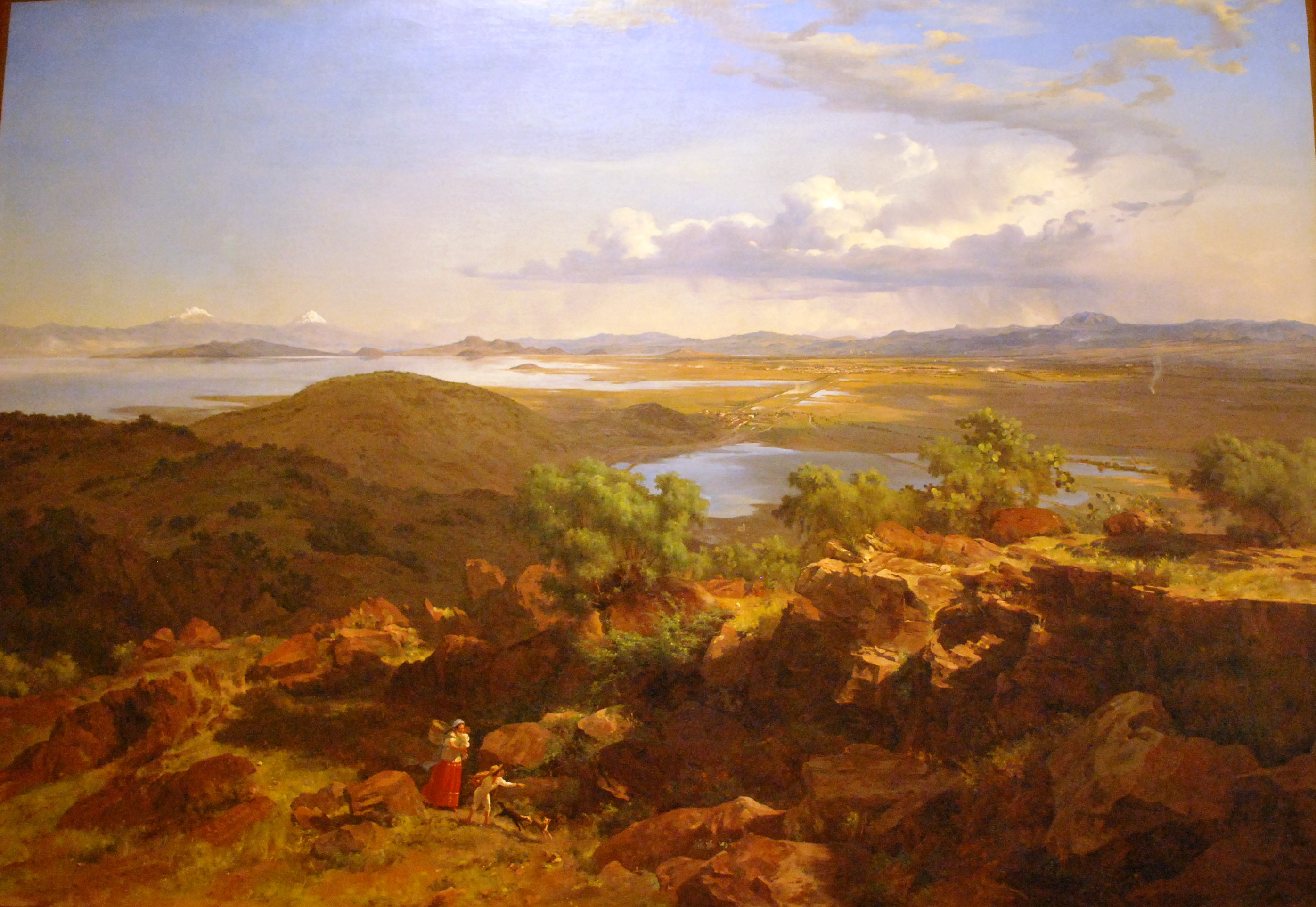
Valley of Mexico from Santa Isabel hill

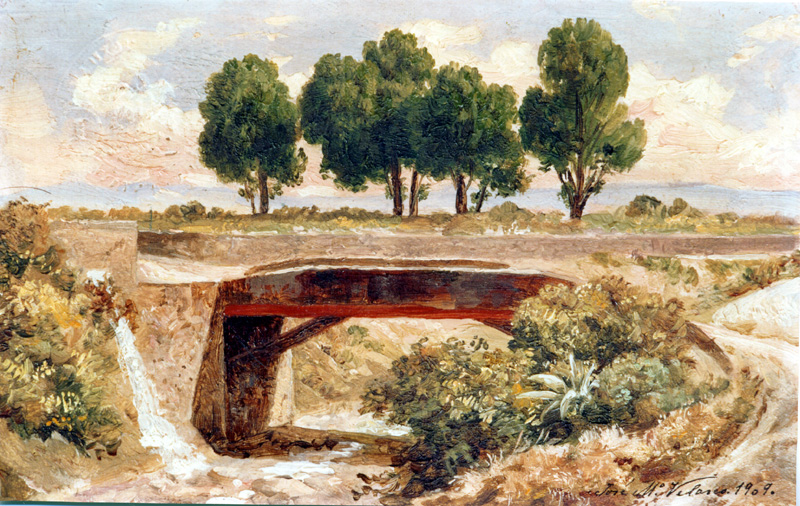
Barranca del Muerto, 1909

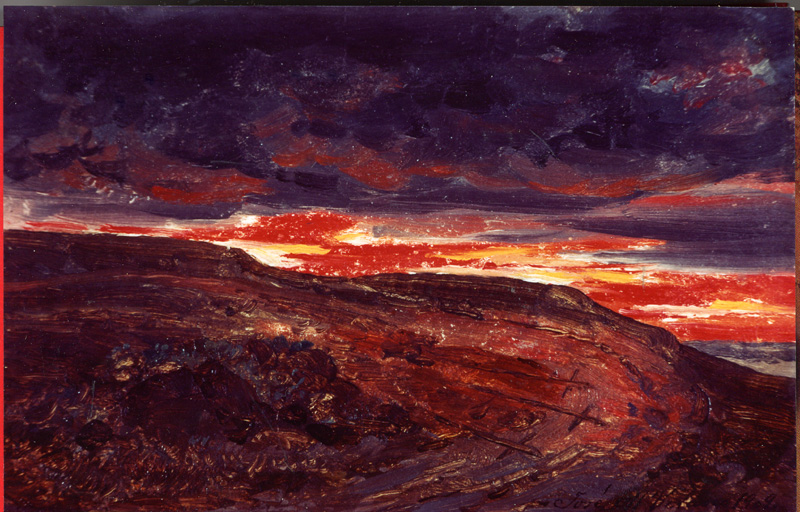
Calvary, 1909

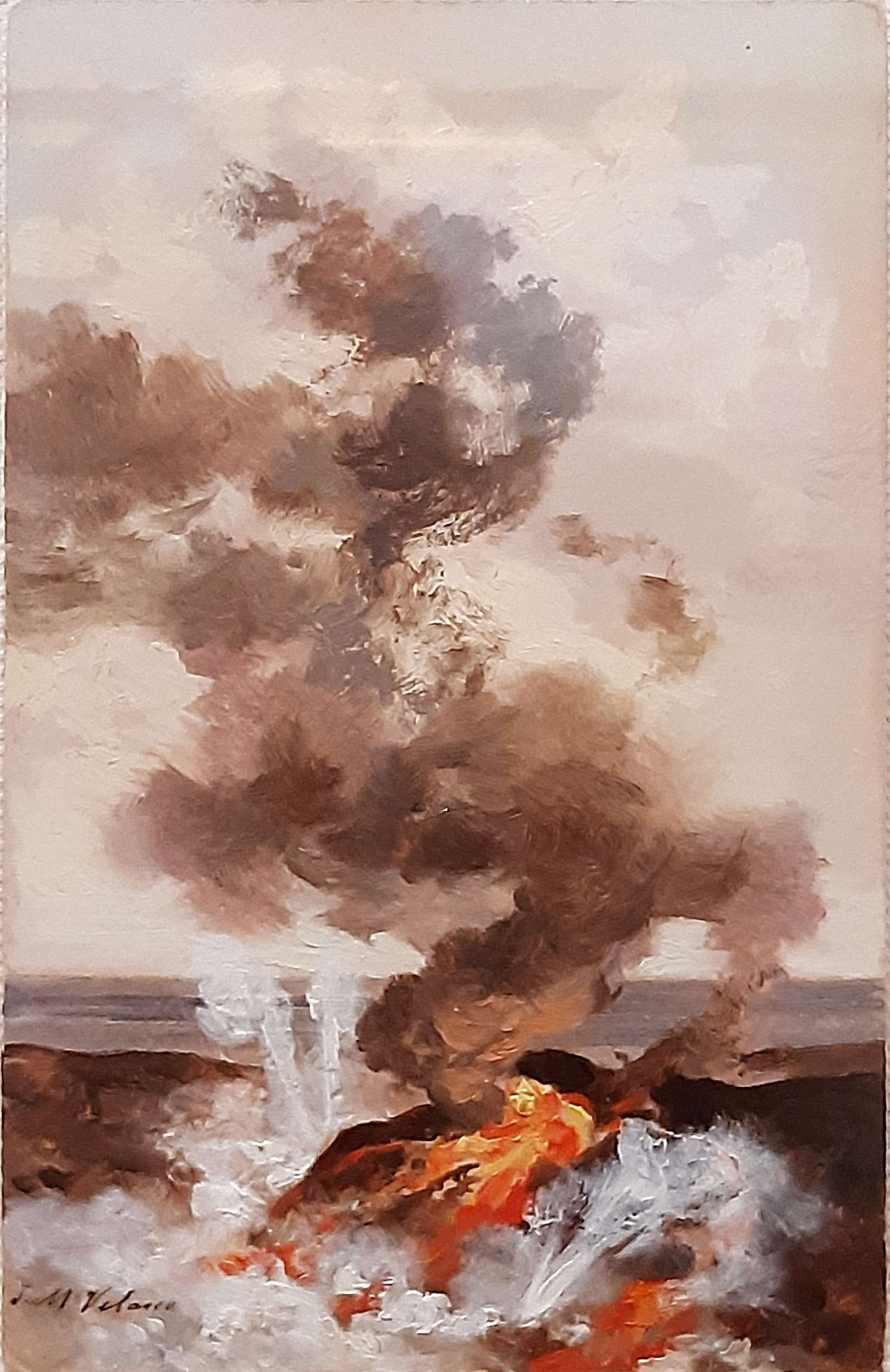
Eruption, 1910

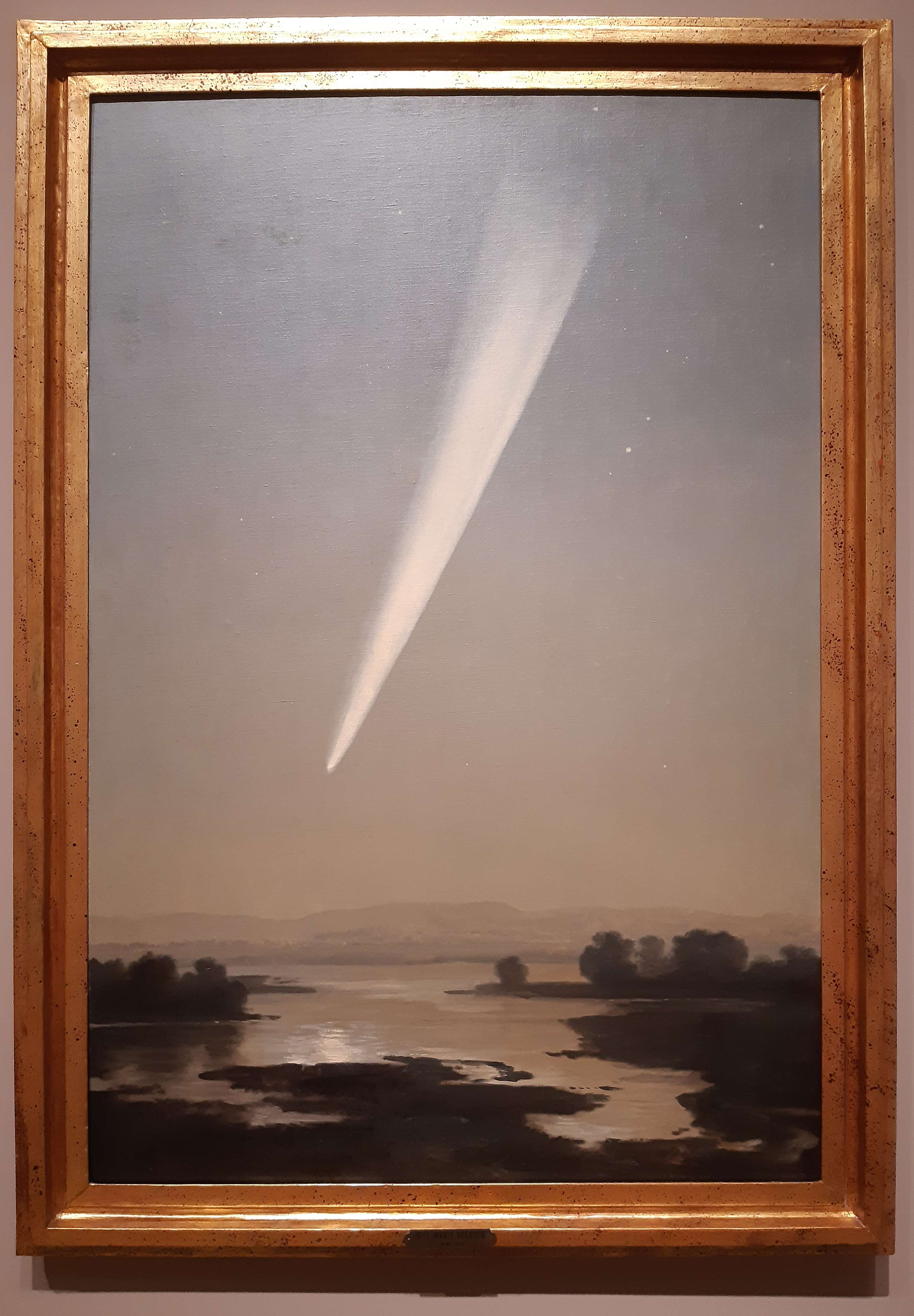
The Great Comet of 1882, painted 1910
