= Silvia Fernández Barrio =

Argentine journalist

Silvia Fernández Barrio (Note: In this name that follows Hispanic American naming customs, the first or paternal surname is Fernández and the second or maternal family name is Barrio.) (born 1952) is an Argentine journalist. She is currently retired from working in media TV, a consequence of her on-going health issues related to the psoriasis from which she has suffered since the age of 18. Post-retirement, she started to manage the Peoples Civil Association.

Barrio, a former translator between Spanish and English, became well known for her broadcasting on channel 9 during the 1980s and by the launching of the first color television broadcasts at ATC from 1990 to 1994. She lived in Salta where she presented the local news broadcasting, before relocating to the City of Buenos Aires where became well known in the international TV broadcasting industry when she was hired by General Carlos Montero to report in English and Spanish broadcasting for Argentina and Latin America.

During the National Reorganization Process dictatorship, she was hired in 1977 by Carlos Montero, vice president and controller of the state-owned channel ATC, to conduct 60 Minutes, the news program of the station of the Argentine Navy. As secretary of Carlos Montero, ATC's programming manager during the 1976-1983 dictatorship, she proposed him to become the face of "60 Minutos" the channel's newscast. With Horacio Larrosa's journalistic direction, the program became the Armed Forces' propaganda tool. From there, Fernández Barrio embarked on a television career at ATC and also worked on several commercials.

== Falklands War ==
Fernández Barrio was an announcer for Radio Liberty, created by the Argentine Armed Forces during the Falklands War for British soldiers, who identified her as "Argentine Annie", the voice of the Navy's psychological warfare during the Falklands conflict.

Between 1986 and 1987 she was part of La mañana on Radio Buenos Aires in Buenos Aires, together with Raúl Urtizberea, Oscar Otranto, Carlos Burone and Oscar del Priore.
