= Berrios =

Berrios or Berríos is a Spanish surname. Notable people with the surname include:

Celebrity

- Gabriela Berríos (born 1990), Puerto Rican model and Miss Universe Puerto Rico 2014

Music

- Steve Berrios (1945–2013), American jazz drummer and percussionist

Politics

- Ángel O. Berríos (1940–2006), Puerto Rican politician
- Baudilio Vega Berríos (1902–1987), Puerto Rican politician
- Carmen Berríos, Puerto Rican politician
- Carmen Luz Berríos, Puerto Rican politician
- Joseph Berrios (born 1952), American politician
- Maria Antonia Berrios (born 1977), American politician
- Rubén Berríos (born 1939), Puerto Rican lawyer and politician

Science

- Eugenio Berríos (1947–1992), Chilean biochemist
- Germán Elías Berríos, Peruvian psychiatrist

Sports

- Braxton Berrios (born 1995), American football player
- Gregory Berríos (born 1979), Puerto Rican volleyball player
- Harry Berrios (born 1971), American baseball player and coach
- Héctor Berríos (born 1986), Chilean footballer
- José Berríos (born 1994), Puerto Rican baseball player
- Mario Esteban Berríos (born 1981), Chilean footballer
- Mario René Berríos (born 1982), Honduran footballer
