= Ángel Barrios =

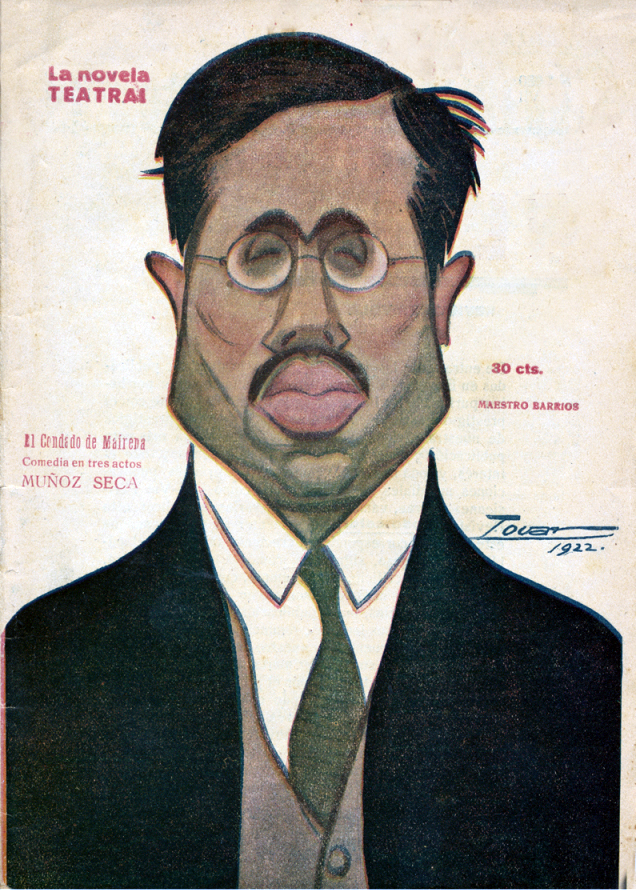

Ángel Barrios (Granada, 1882–Madrid, 1964) was a Spanish composer and concert guitarist.

He was the son of Flamenco guitarist Antonio 'El Polinario' Barrios, and after himself starting with the violin soon himself turned to the guitar.

His work "Arroyos de la Alhambra" is known thanks to Pepe Romero performing it for Guitar Salon International's YouTube channel.
