= Ignacio Barrios =

Mexican artist (1930–2013)

- Born: Ignacio Barrios Prudencio; March 10, 1930; Zacualpan, México
- Died: 22 January 2013 (aged 82); Mexico City, Mexico
- Known for: Painting, watercolor painting

Ignacio Barrios (March 10, 1930 – January 22, 2013) was a Mexican painter mostly known for his absolute commitment to watercolour painting. He earned the reputation of one of the top watercolour painters in his country of origin and possibly the most distinctive of them all. Even though the themes he depicts in his work are diverse, landscapes are perhaps his most celebrated works.

== Biography ==
“The art should be spontaneous in its entirety, just like the artist: fallible, transitory and with limitations.”

Barrios was born in the municipality of Mineral de Zacualpan, State of Mexico, Mexico, on March 10, 1930. He was the youngest of the five children of Eustolio Barrios Hernández - a local miner and farmer - and Isabel Prudencio Flores. Since his early childhood, Barrios was deeply fascinated with nature, which perhaps came to him from his father, who used to watch over the nearby forests and protect them against illegal logging every morning. And by doing so, he was also passing on to his son a true love and respect for the place where they lived. For several years, the Barrios made their living out of selling flowers and fruits which they collected around their plot. Barrios would then reflect all these memories through his paintings of still life and multicoloured flowers.

His interest in painting was clearly noticeable since his early childhood days, for he would skip classes from time to time to go outside and make drawings of the surrounding fields. This resulted in a number of predicaments both at school and at home. During those early days, due to the poverty in which his family lived, he found a way to create his own painting materials. For instance, when he needed something to draw or paint with, he would manufacture his own paintbrush out of a few horsehairs tied up on a twig.

“I began painting at a very young age. I created my first watercolour work when I was barely seven or eight years old; evidently, back then I did not understand art or any of its concepts; I was only focused on painting and drawing. With time, what used to be a hobby began to transform into a passion so strong that I would frequently skip class to go to the field and soothe the urge I felt to be in contact with nature. This resulted in me failing second and third degrees in elementary school, and in severe reprimands from my father week after week, after week. This went on until the fifth degree of elementary. It was at that moment when finally, after eight years (1937–1945) of constant absentees in the ‘Roque Diaz’ Elementary School of Zacualpan and having had enough reprimands from my parents, I ran away from the town...”

Thus, Barrios arrives in Cuernavaca, Morelos, in the year 1946, after receiving an invitation from a friend who had offered him to take painting lessons under the condition of moving to that city. How big was his disillusion when he received a large paintbrush, a can full of paint and the instruction on how to paint the walls of a local store. The artist ludicrously remembers that was his first official painting work. He stayed in Cuernavaca for an entire year before moving to Mexico City, Mexico, where he managed to enrol in the San Carlos Academy (1948), in part thanks to the support from the prominent Mexican painter Diego Rivera, with whom he met as soon as he arrived in the Mexican capital city. Rivera also gave Barrios some advice and guidance on drawing and colour techniques.

In 1949, Barrios worked as a sign designer at Eureka Rótulos Neón, where he met his first sponsor, Mr. Alejandro Tajonar Torres. Barrios received a fixed salary (1950–1952) from Tajonar to help him with his then ongoing studies at the School of Arts and Advertising (Escuela Libre de Arte y Publicidad), where he was the student of Ricardo Bárcenas. These were the years where he would know other eminent professors as Barrios grew in the artistic environment, including Carlos Inclán and General Ignacio Beteta. By the end of his studies, he was the winner of a drawing contest that opened for him the doors of the once important Airlines "Mexicana de Aviación". It was in the now extinct airlines that Barrios met his second sponsor, Mr. José Antonio Patiño, who was quick to understand that Barrios was considerably more inclined to artistic painting rather than commercial drawing. And thus, Mr. Patiño felt moved to sponsor not only several of Barrios' voyages around the globe, but also a number of expositions. From that moment (1965), and held up by the ceaseless support of Mr. Patiño, Barrios began to devote all his efforts to the watercolour technique.

== Education and influences ==
Despite studying for seven months at the San Carlos Academy (1948), for one year (1948–1949) at the La Esmeralda School of Painting and Sculpturing, where he was the student of the renowned muralist Raúl Anguiano, Ignacio Barrios is, in strict terms, a self-taught artist who is constantly striving to renovate and remodel his work. As soon as he felt that Academy studies were not enough to satisfy his restless spirit, he decided to leave the schools to continue learning on his own.

It is nonetheless undeniable that the artist Ricardo Bárcenas had a strong influence at the beginning of his drawing career, and that of Ignacio M. Beteta strikes at first sight in Barrios' early landscapes. An important imprint in his work was exercised by the celebrated British painter William Turner, from whom the Mexican virtuoso took several elements which have allowed him to obtain his own textures and environments. And finally, his "free-style" brushing and the use of humidity are both elements taken from the American watercolourist John Marin.

== Work ==
Barrios began his work painting classical and academic landscapes. Critics admire how he was able to move from costumbrismo, to impressionism, to surrealism. In later years, he occasionally put figurative art aside to seek semi-abstract creations. His work is mainly characterised by landscaping (both Mexican and international), urban environment, Art Marine, still life, human body, portraits, abstract and semi-abstract art. While his early work took him to a position of privilege amongst the most renowned landscapers, the aesthetic level he reached in the development and reproduction of human figure is no less remarkable.

From 1965 to 1981, his work was primarily notable for the use of gray and ochre tones that helped him find harmonious tonalities. Those were the years of Barrios' Europeanisation, since a large proportion of his artistic evolution as a painter took place in Europe. During the 80's, his work began to acquire a broader variety of colours which has advanced the expressive strength of his paintings.

Barrios' work is clearly apparent. His unique mastery of water and handling of humidity make his watercolour technique even more complex, and along with his wide impressionism traits, he was able to, in his own words, "let water speak its own language."

== Awards and recognitions ==
Throughout his life, Ignacio Barrios received a number of well-earned homages, awards and recognitions. Some of the most notable are: the Award to the Best Watercolour, presented to him by the Watercolour Association of Mexico (Círculo de Acuarelistas de México) for his piece "El Valle del Silencio" ("The Silent Valley"), in 1981; the José María Velasco Medal, presented by the State of Mexico in recognition of his achievements in the field of plastic arts, in 1986. In 2004, the former Governor of the State of Mexico, Arturo Montiel Rojas, organized an homage for Barrios during the re-opening of the Watercolour Museum of Toluca (capital city of the State of Mexico), wherein a permanent exposition of Barrios can be seen. Similarly, the "Noticiero Continental de Cine" (Continental Film News Program) has dedicated nine programs to this Mexican painter. From the 1980s, Barrios devoted part of his efforts to teaching and influenced a new generation of watercolourists. Some of his most important students included Gabriela Abud and Ulises Castro.

== Expositions ==
His first individual exposition was held in the Canton Palace, in the city of Mérida, Yucatán, in 1964. His work has been exhibited in Jamaica, United States, England, Canada, Japan, Spain, Germany, Italy, Poland, the former Soviet Union, Ukraine, Estonia, Argentina, El Salvador and Colombia.
