= Barrios, Jujuy =

Coordinates: 22°14′46″S 65°31′44″W

Barrios (Jujuy)
- Rural municipality and village
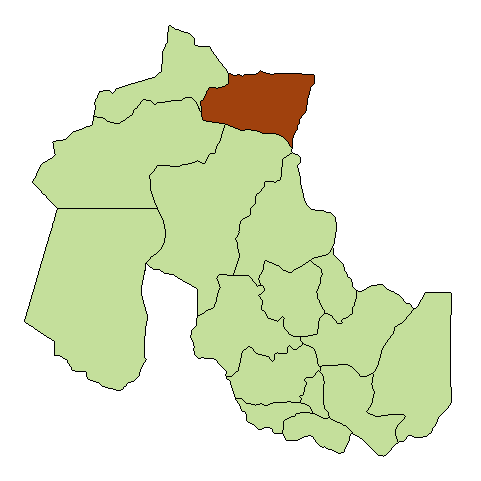
- Country: Argentina
- Province: Jujuy Province

Government
  - Type: City Commission President

Population (2001)
  - Total: 192
- Time zone: UTC−3 (ART)
- Postal code: Y4650
- Area code: 03885

Barrios (Jujuy) is a rural municipality and village in Jujuy Province in Argentina.

== Climate ==
Climate data for Barrios (1972–1990)
| Month | Jan | Feb | Mar | Apr | May | Jun | Jul | Aug | Sep | Oct | Nov | Dec | Year |
|---|---|---|---|---|---|---|---|---|---|---|---|---|---|
| Daily mean °C (°F) | 11.9 (53.4) | 11.7 (53.1) | 11.2 (52.2) | 9.0 (48.2) | 6.1 (43.0) | 4.2 (39.6) | 3.7 (38.7) | 5.7 (42.3) | 7.5 (45.5) | 9.8 (49.6) | 11.1 (52.0) | 11.6 (52.9) | 8.6 (47.5) |
| Average precipitation mm (inches) | 77 (3.0) | 77 (3.0) | 51 (2.0) | 10 (0.4) | 0 (0) | 0 (0) | 0 (0) | 1 (0.0) | 7 (0.3) | 12 (0.5) | 29 (1.1) | 69 (2.7) | 333 (13.1) |
Source: Instituto Nacional de Tecnología Agropecuaria

== Population ==
Barrios has a population of 192 according to the 2001 census, which represents an increase of 182% over the previous census in 1991 where the population was 68.
