= Eugenio Landesio =

Italian painter

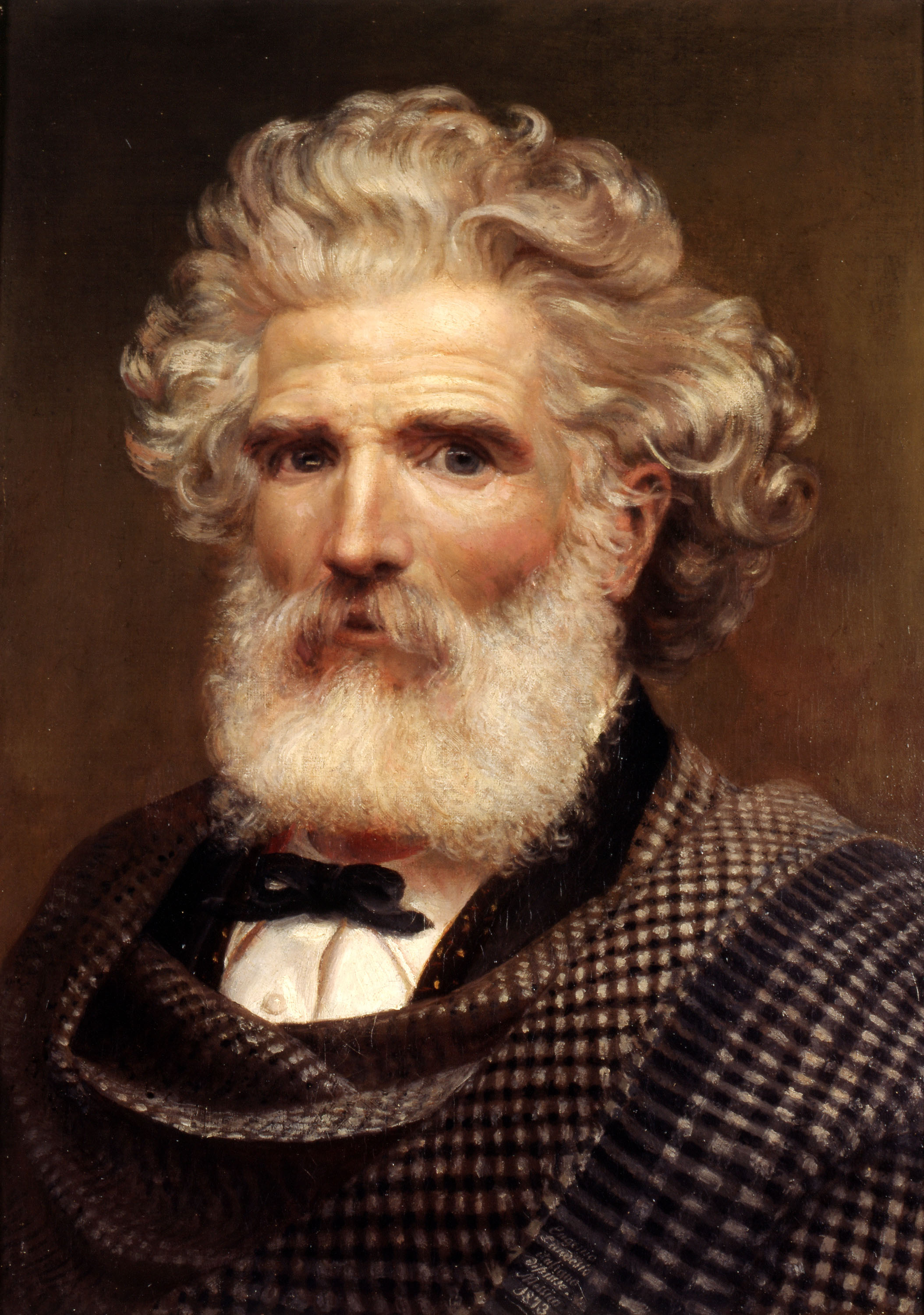
Eugenio Landesio

Eugenio Landesio (1810–1879) was an Italian painter and a pupil of the Hungarian landscape painter Károly Markó the Elder. Landesio’s career in Mexico was marked by his years at the Academy of San Carlos, where he exercised an influence on later exponents of Mexican landscape painting such as José María Velasco.

== Early years ==
Eugenio Landesio was born in 1810 in Altessano, a village near Turin in Italy. Born into a family of silversmiths, he lived in Rome as a child. He became so fond of drawing at an early age that his father resigned himself to the fact that he would be a painter. Landesio began to study landscape painting under the French painter Amédée Bourgeois and went on to become a pupil of the Hungarian landscape painter Károly Markó the Elder.

== Arrival in Mexico ==
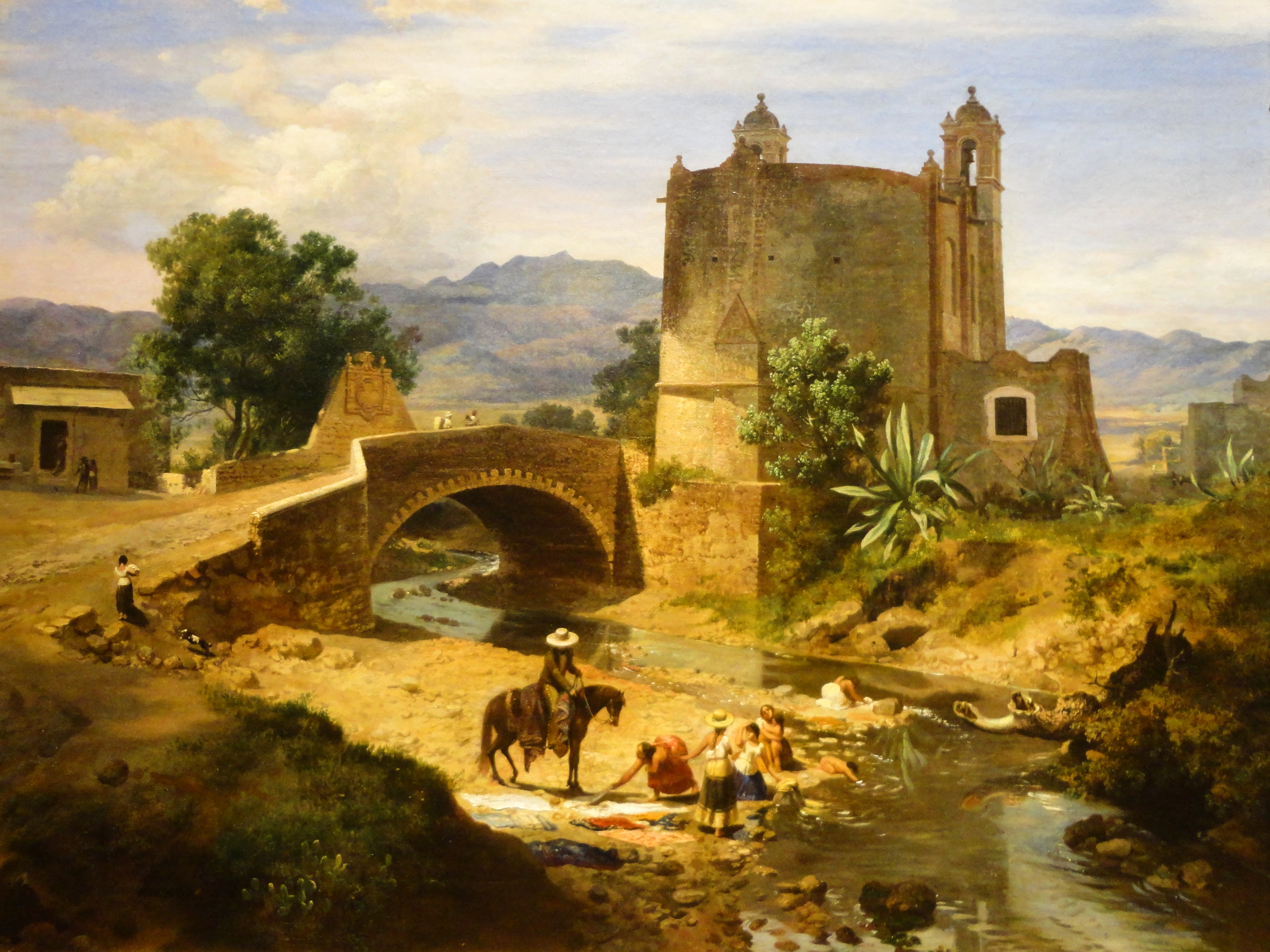
El Puente de San Antonio en el camino de San Ángel junto a Panzacola, 1855.

Like his teacher, Landesio was a Romantic landscape painter, with a tendency to emphasize the sweetness and mellowness of his scenes. His work became known in Mexico when several of his paintings were acquired by the Academy of San Carlos. In January 1855, at the invitation of the Catalan painter Pelegrín Clavé, who was director of the figure painting section of the Academy, he went to Mexico to give classes in landscape, perspective, and the principles of ornamentation.

Landesio wrote three books on landscape painting that served as textbooks for the students of the Academy of San Carlos: Los cimientos del artista dibujante y pintor. Compendio de perspectivas lineal y aérea, sombras, espejos y refracción, con las nociones necesarias de geometría (The Foundations of the Draftsman Artist and Painter: A compendium of lineal and aerial perspectives, shadows, mirrors, and refraction, with the necessary notions of geometry, 1866); La pintura general o de paisaje y la perspectiva en la Academia Nacional de San Carlos (General or Landscape Painting and Perspective in the Academy of San Carlos, 1867); and Escursión a la caverna de Cacahuamilpa y ascensión al cráter del Popocatepetl (Excursion to the Cacahuamilpa Cavern and Ascent to the Crater of Popocatépetl, 1868).

In 1873, during the administration of President Sebastián Lerdo de Tejada, the teachers at the Academy were required to swear adherence to the Reform Laws. Eugenio Landesio refused and had to resign his position. He wanted to be succeeded by José María Velasco, but Ignacio Manuel Altamirano imposed his own candidate, Salvador Murillo, provoking a public dispute between the painter and the novelist.

== Influence ==
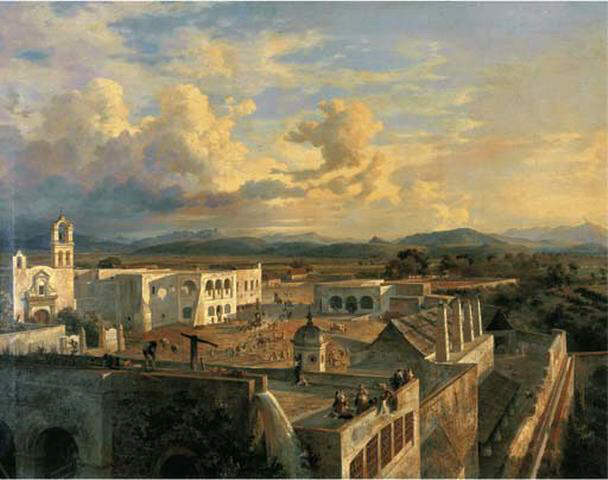
Hacienda de Colón, 1857 - 1858.

Landesio exercised a positive influence in his field, comparable to that of the Catalan friends who had recommended him in their own fields of figure painting and sculpture. It can be claimed that the practice of landscape painting as a regular institutionalized activity in Mexico began with Landesio. He had numerous outstanding disciples, including José Jiménez (1830–1859), Gregorio Dumaine (1843–1889), Luis Coto (1830–1891), Salvador Murillo (1840-?), who took over Landesio’s teaching position from 1873 to 1875, Javier Álvarez, and one exceptional one, who was to consolidate the discipline in Mexico and take over as the foremost teacher of the following generation: José María Velasco (1840–1912).

Landesio was an academic painter to the manner born, of great didactic and analytical talent. In line with academic norms, his teaching method at San Carlos involved the decomposition of landscape into its constituent elements, followed by the gradual detailed study of these elements and their subsequent restructuring, to esthetic ends, in the definitive composition. He combined work in the studio with painting from nature in the open air.

Landesio distinguished two large parts or integral sub-totalities of landscape: “localities” and “episodes.” The former include the different kinds of landscape surroundings and environments (skies, foliage, lands, water, buildings), while the latter include the different figurative groups that confer on a given place a sense of scale, differentiating topical features, narrative interest, or historical density (history, popular, military, or family scenes, portraits, animals).

== Work ==
Amongst his most important works are El Valle de México desde el cerro del Tenayo. The Valley of Mexico from the Hill of Tenayo (1870) part of the Museo Nacional de Arte's Collection and Patio de la Hacienda de Regla. Patio of the Hacienda de Regla (1857).

== Galería ==
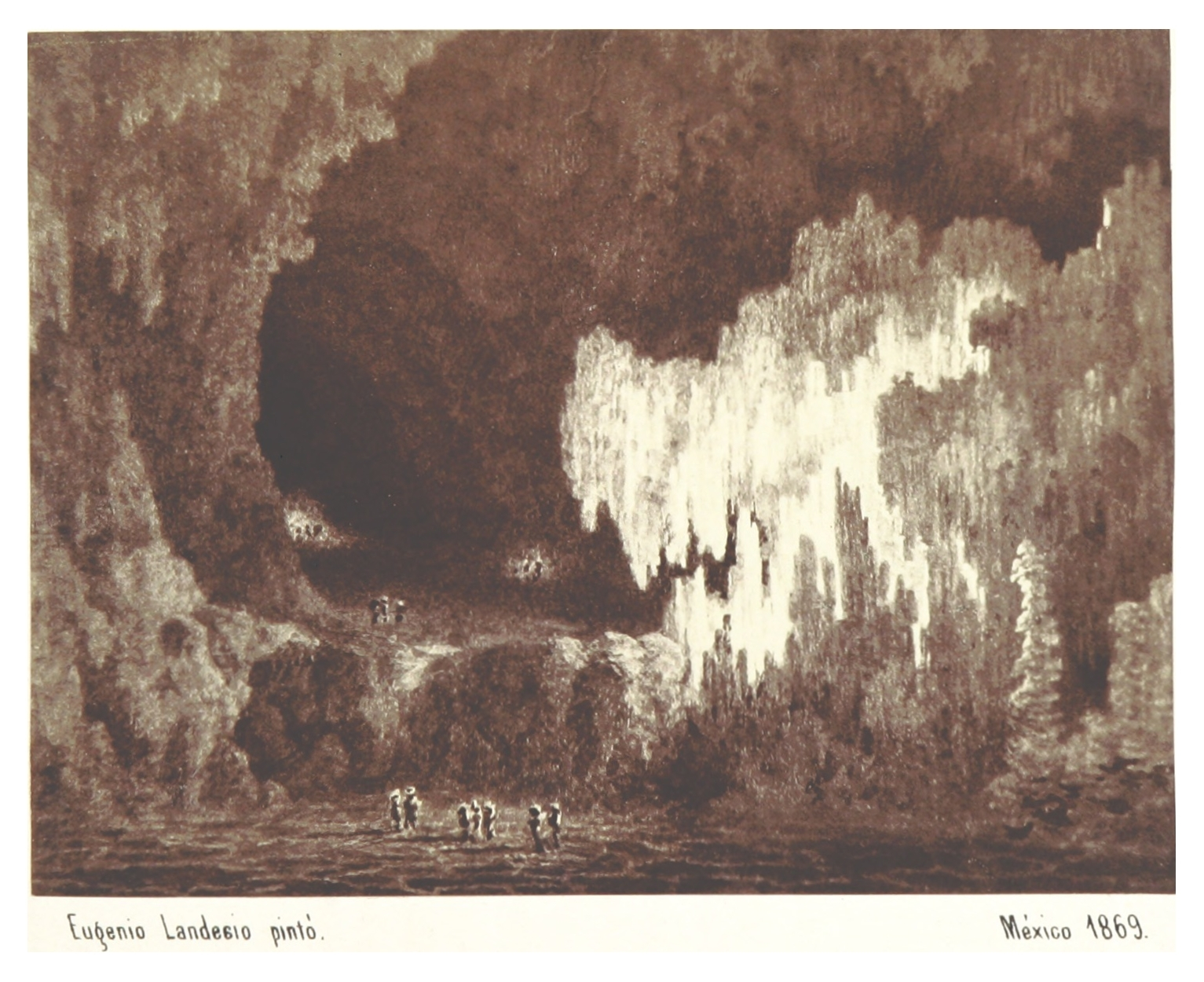
Page 20 of Excursión a la Caverna de Cacahuamilpa y ascensión al Cráter del Popocatépetl.

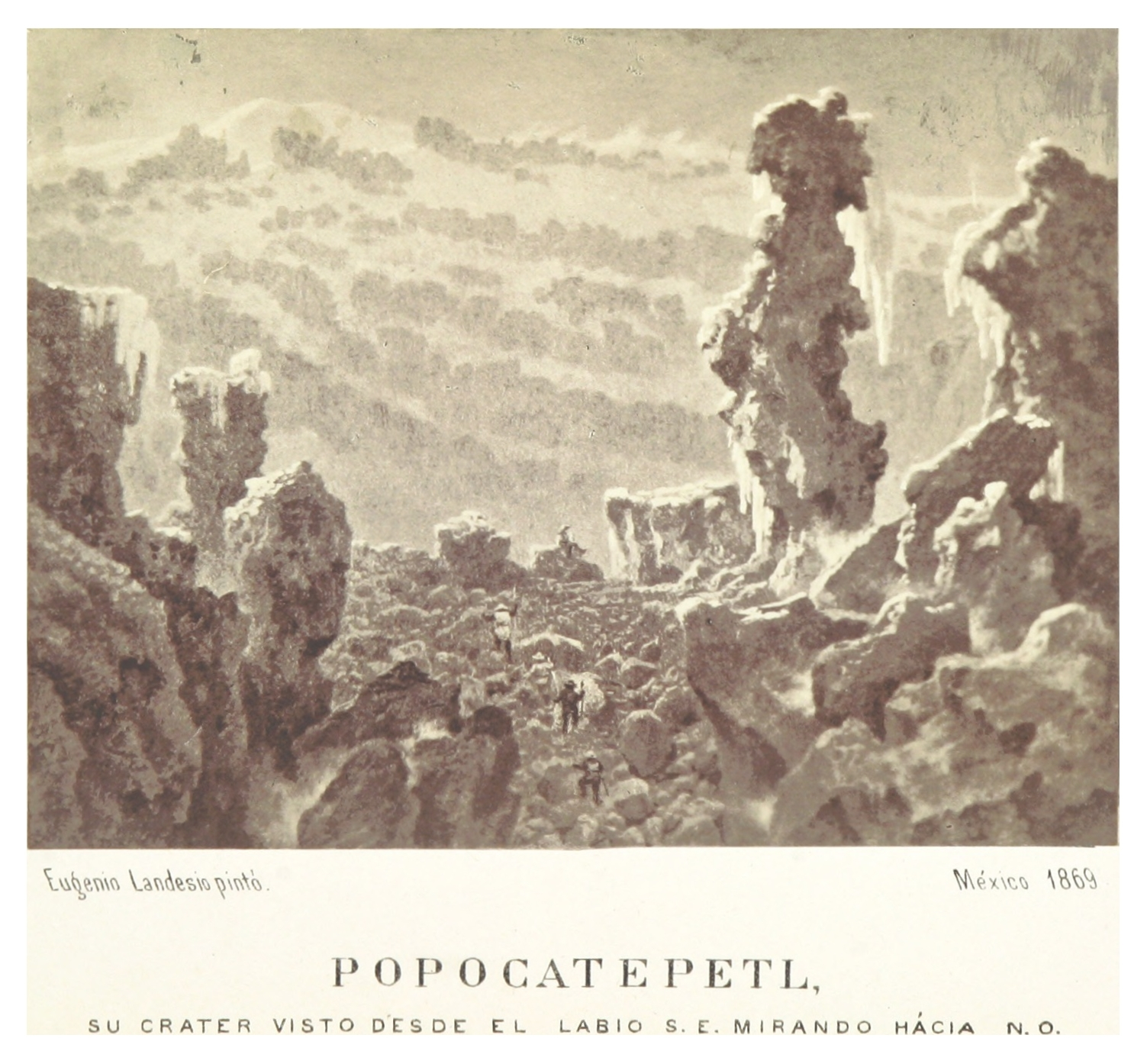
Page 48 of Excursión a la Caverna de Cacahuamilpa y ascensión al Cráter del Popocatépetl.

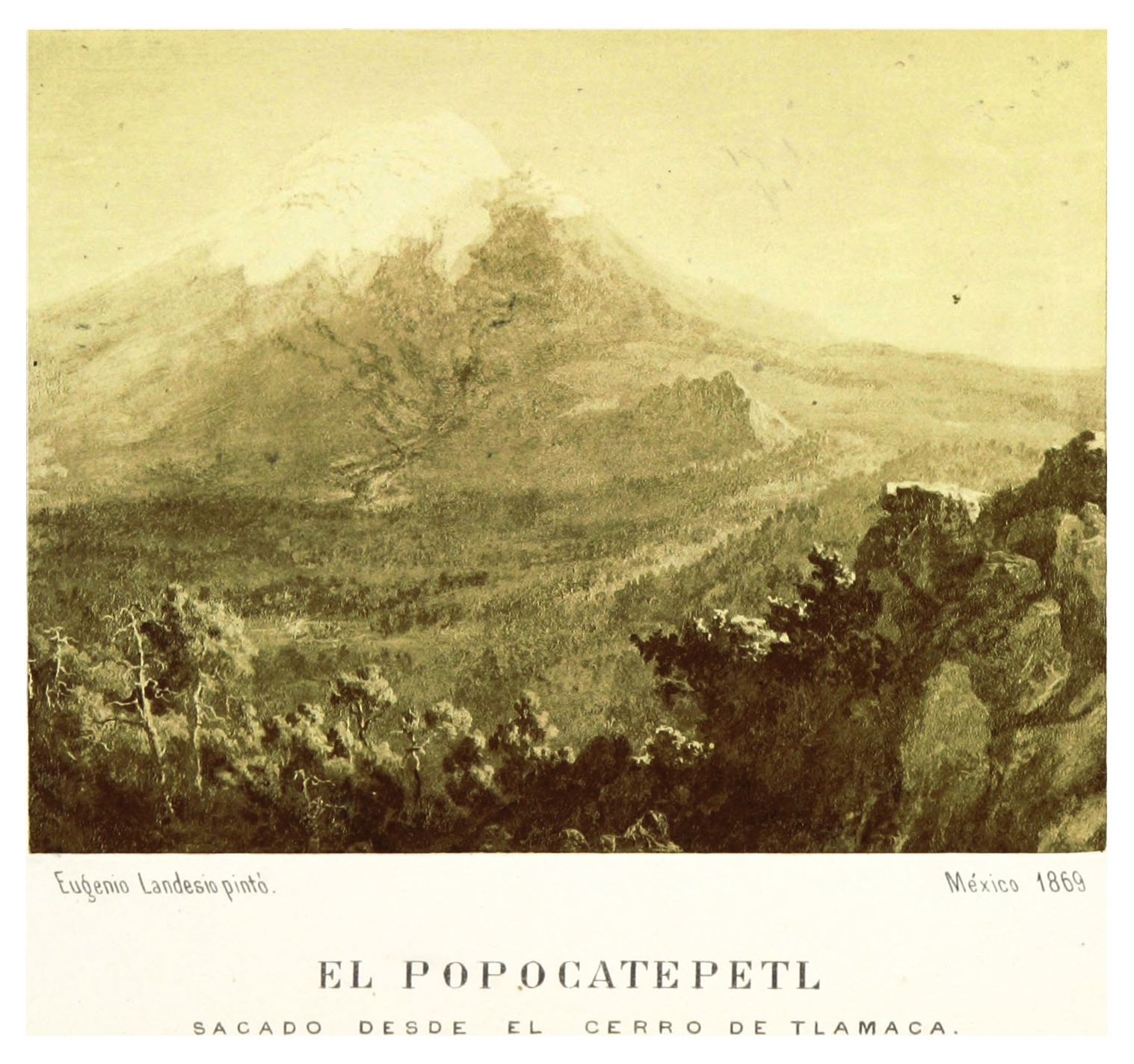
Page 50 of Excursión a la Caverna de Cacahuamilpa y ascensión al Cráter del Popocatépetl.

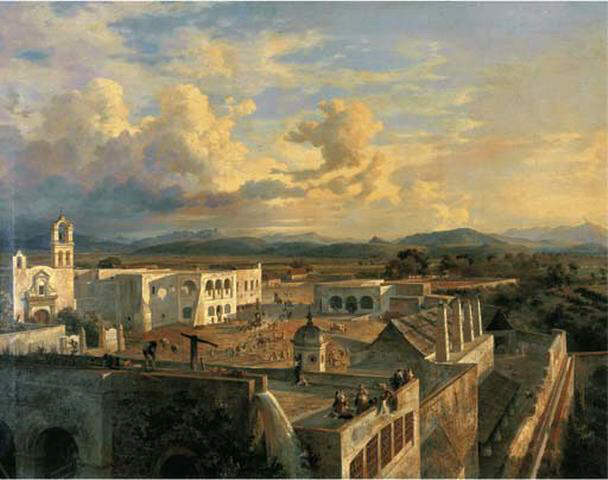
La hacienda de Colón (The hacienda of Columbus) (1857 - 1858)

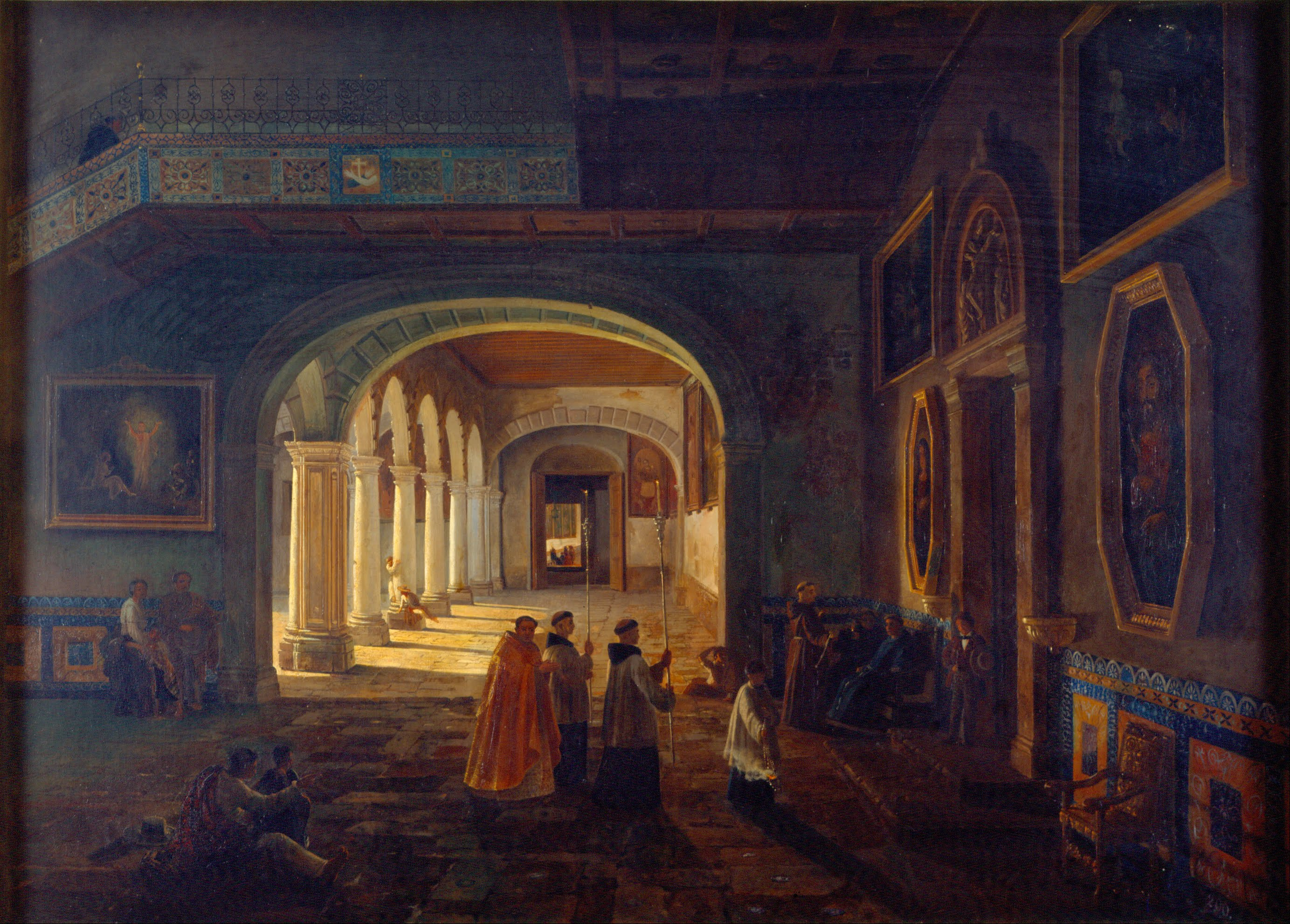
Antesacristía del convento de San Francisco (Anteacristy of the convent of San Francisco) (1855)

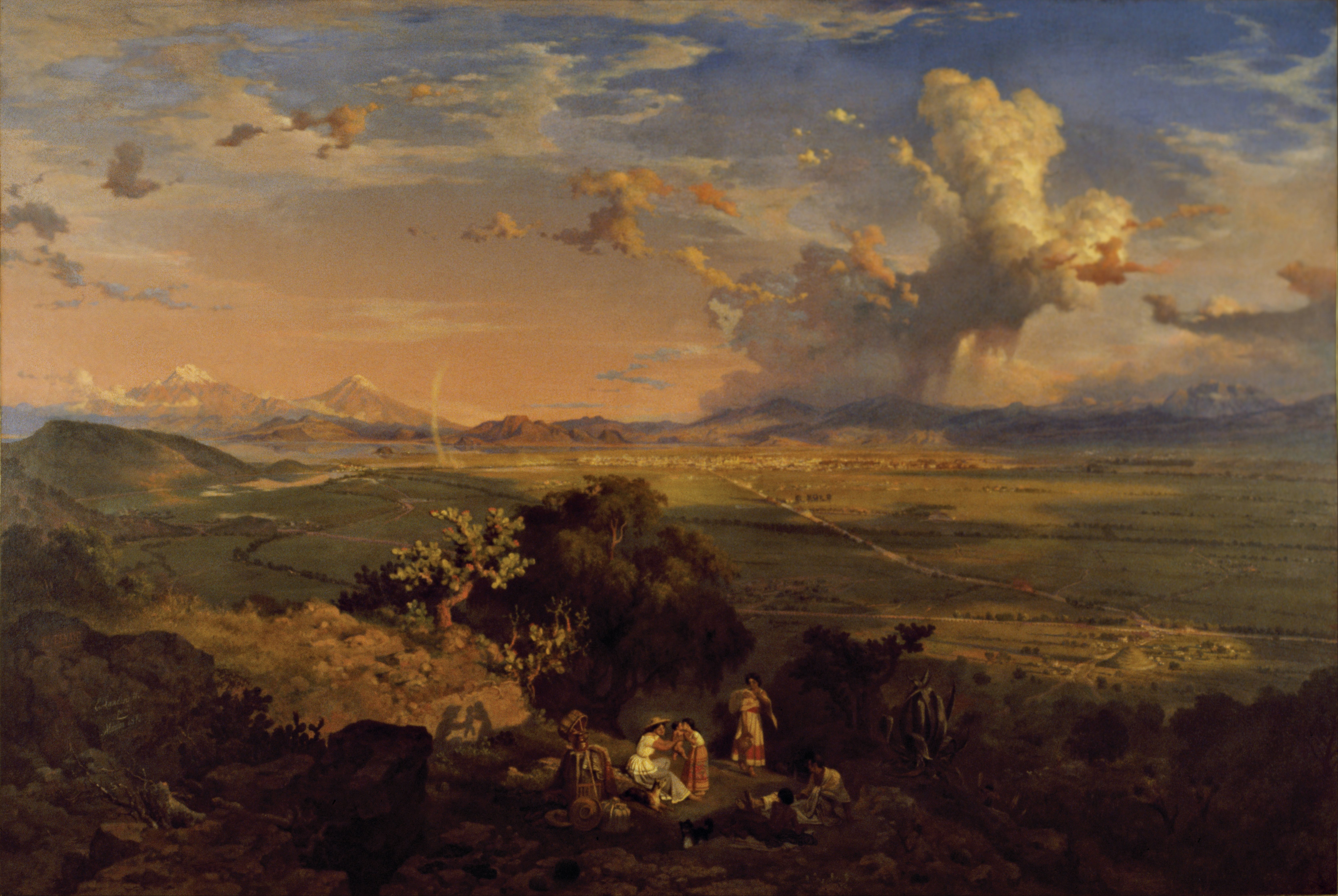
El Valle de México desde el cerro de Tenayo (The Valley of Mexico from the hill of Tenay) (1870)

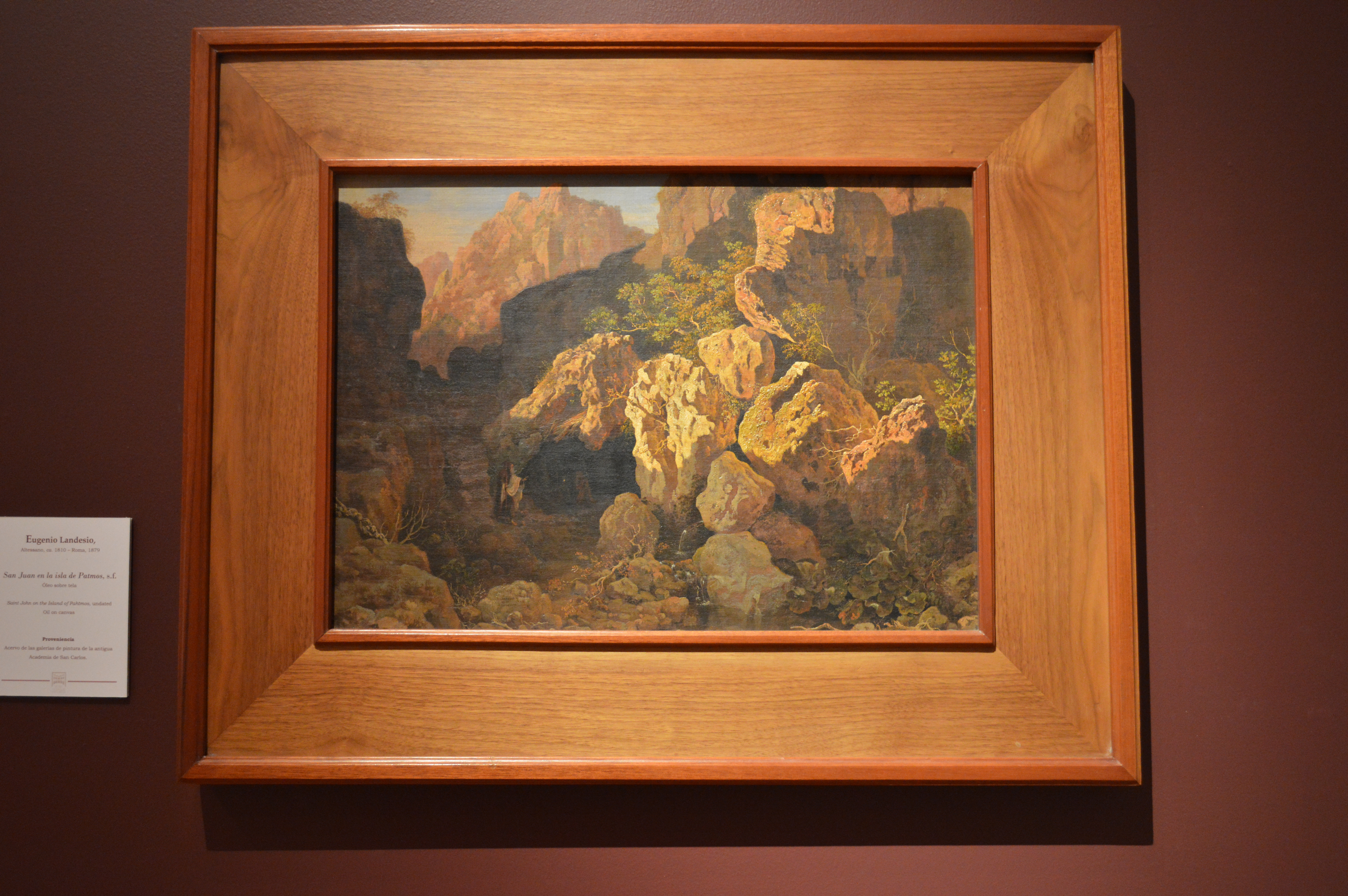
San Juan en la Isla de Patmos (San Juan in the island of Patmos)

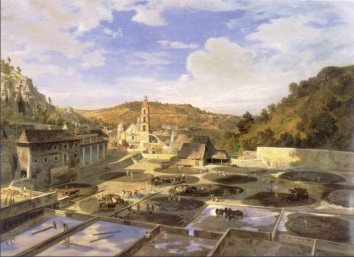
Patio de la Hacienda de Regla (Courtyard of the Hacienda de Regla) (1857) Picture of the collection of Museo Soumaya
