= Barrio (surname) =

Barrio is a Spanish surname. Notable people with the surname include:

- Artur Barrio (born 1945), Brazilian artist
- Diego Martínez Barrio (1882–1965), Spanish politician
- Francisco Barrio (1950–2025), Mexican politician
- Paquita la del Barrio (1947–2025), Mexican singer, songwriter, and actress
- Ramon Del Barrio (born 1964), American performer, choreographer, dancer and singer
- Sonia Barrio (born 1969), Spanish field hockey player
- Víctor Barrio (1987–2016), Spanish bullfighter

== See also ==
- Berrios
