= Carmen Berríos =

Puerto Rican politician

Carmen Luz Berríos

Member of the Puerto Rico Senate from the Guayama district
- In office 1997–2001

Personal details
- Born: January 20, 1946 (age 80) Naranjito, Puerto Rico
- Party: New Progressive Party (PNP)
- Education: Interamerican University of Puerto Rico (B.Ed.); University of Phoenix (M.Ed)
- Profession: Teacher, Politician, Senator

Carmen Luz "Carmín" Berríos Rivera is a Puerto Rican educator and politician. She was a member of the Senate of Puerto Rico from 1997 to 2001.

== Early years and education ==
She attended Agustín Stahl High School in Bayamón, Puerto Rico where she graduated in 1964. Has a BA in education from the Interamerican University of Puerto Rico and a Masters in administration and Supervision concentrated in psychology of the University of Phoenix. and a Masters in administration and Supervision concentrated in psychology of the University of Phoenix. From 1966 to 1987 she worked as an English teacher in several schools in the town of Naranjito, from 1989 to 1990 she held the position of Director of the Santa Teresita Academy in Naranjito. She is currently the President of the General Council for Education, the official authorized accrediting agency of the Government of Puerto Rico.

== Politics ==
Berríos presented her candidacy to the Senate of Puerto Rico in 1996, to represent the District of Guayama. At the 1996 general elections, she won with 24.4% of the votes. In 2000, Berríos ran again for Senate, but lost to the candidates of the PPD.
