= Swedish Police Authority =

National law enforcement agency of Sweden

Swedish Police Authority Polismyndigheten
- Common name: Polisen (the police)

Agency overview
- Formed: 1 January 2015
- Preceding agencies: Swedish National Police Board; 21 local police authorities
- Employees: 32,000 (2020)
- Annual budget: SEK 21 billion (2015)
- Legal personality: Governmental: Government agency

Jurisdictional structure
- National agency: Sweden
- Operations jurisdiction: Sweden
- Governing body: Riksdag
- Constituting instruments: Police Act (1984:387); Ordinance (2022:1718) containing instructions for the Police Authority; The Police Ordinance (2014:1104)
- General nature: Civilian police

Operational structure
- Headquarters: Kungsholmen, Stockholm
- Minister responsible: Gunnar Strömmer, Minister for Justice
- Agency executive: Petra Lundh, National Police Commissioner
- Departments: 8: National Forensics Centre; National Operations Department; Communications Department; Development Department; Finance Department; Human Resources Department; IT Department; Legal Department
- Police regions: 7: North Region; Central Region; Bergslagen Region; East Region; West Region; South Region; Stockholm Region

Website
- polisen.se/en/

The Swedish Police Authority (Swedish: Polismyndigheten) is the national police force (Polisen) of Sweden. The first modern police force in Sweden was established in the mid-19th century, and the police remained in effect under local government control up until 1965, when it was nationalized and became increasingly centralized, to finally organise under one authority 1 January 2015. Concurrent with this change, the Swedish Security Service formed its own agency. The new authority was created to address shortcomings in the division of duties and responsibilities, and to make it easier for the Government to demand greater accountability. The agency is organised into seven police regions and eight national departments. It is one of the largest government agencies in Sweden, with more than 28,500 employees, of which police officers accounted for approximately 75 percent of the personnel in 2014. It takes two and a half years to become a police officer in Sweden, including six months of paid workplace practice. Approximately a third of all police students are women, and in 2011 women accounted for 40 percent of all employees.

== General structuring ==
The agency is headed by the National Police Commissioner, who is appointed by the Government and has the sole responsibility for all activities of the police. Although formally organised under the Ministry of Justice, the Swedish police is—similar to other authorities in Sweden—essentially autonomous, in accordance with the constitution. (Note: See also the article on Ministerstyre and the official translation of the constitution at the Riksdag website: 1974 Instrument of Government, Chapter 12, Art. 2) The agency is governed by general policy instruments and is subject to a number of sanctions and oversight functions, to ensure that the exercise of public authority is in compliance with regulations. Police officers typically wear a dark-blue uniform consisting of combat style trousers with a police duty belt, a polo shirt or a long sleeve button shirt, and a side-cap embellished with a metal cap badge. The standard equipment includes a handgun, pepper spray and an extendable baton.

== History ==
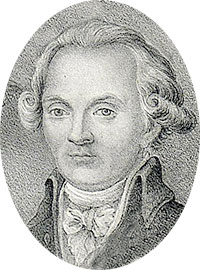
Nils Henric Liljensparre, Stockholm Police Commissioner, 1776

The first modern police force in Sweden was established in the mid-1800s. Prior to that, police work was not carried out by a law enforcement agency in the modern sense. In rural areas, the King's bailiffs (fogde) were responsible for law and order until the establishment of counties in the 1630s. In the cities, local governments were responsible for law and order, by way of a royal decree issued by Magnus III in the 13th century. The cities financed and organised various watchmen who patrolled the streets. In the late 1500s in Stockholm the patrol duties were in large part taken over by a special corps of salaried city guards. The city guard was organised, uniformed and armed like a military unit and were responsible for interventions against various crimes and the arrest of suspected criminals. These guards were assisted by the military, fire patrolmen, and a civilian unit that did not wear a uniform, but instead wore a small badge around the neck. The civilian unit monitored compliance with city ordinances relating to e.g. sanitation issues, traffic and taxes. In 1776, Gustav III ushered in a fundamental change in how police work was organised in Stockholm, modelled after how law enforcement was organised in Paris at the time. The office of Police Commissioner (polismästare) was created, with the first title holder being Nils Henric Liljensparre, who was given command of the civilian unit responsible for law and order in the city, now partly financed by the State. The reform was considered a success, as it made the streets safer. However, the system of fire patrolmen and the city guard was still kept intact and administered separately.

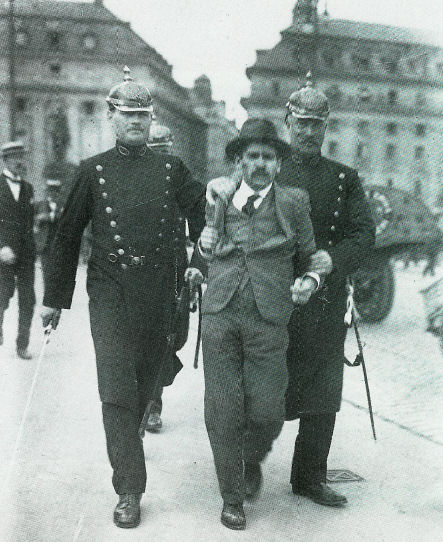
Stockholm police arresting a man for rioting, 1917

In the mid-1800s, during a time of widespread social unrest, it became increasingly clear that law enforcement did not function properly. In 1848, the March Unrest broke out on the streets of Stockholm, inspired by a wave of revolutions in Europe. Large crowds vandalized the city, shouting slogans of reform and calling for the abolition of monarchy. King Oscar I responded with military force, resulting in 30 people being killed.

In rural areas, local county administrators (länsman) were in charge of law and order, reporting to county governors. The office of länsman was a mixture of police chief, tax official and lower-level prosecutor, who in turn was assisted by a number of part-time police officers (fjärdingsmän). Increasingly, their time was spent on tax matters, instead of doing actual police work. More police officers were duly employed, some dubbed "extra police", devoted much more exclusively to police work. In 1850, a new type of organisation was finally launched in Stockholm, where the entire police force was placed under one agency. The title of Police Constable (poliskonstapel) was used for the first time in Sweden, and the police were also given their own uniforms and were armed with batons and sabers. The police also began to specialize. In 1853, for example, four constables were put in charge of criminal investigations, thus creating the first detective bureau in Sweden.

In the early 1900s, the Swedish police had yet to uniformly organise or become regulated in legislation. The system of "extra police" did not work well, partly because it was often a temporary position lacking job security, making it difficult to recruit and retain skilled personnel. Subsequently, the Riksdag adopted the first Police Act in 1925. The act essentially codified structures already in place, but also introduced a more unified police and better working conditions for the police officers. Officers began wearing the same dark-blue uniforms nationwide, with the same weapons and helmets. Local ties remained strong, however, with 554 small districts that had great freedom to organise police work as before, even though the State now had the power to issue a number of regulations about everything from leadership to the duties of the police. There were still some problems maintaining order when larger crowds gathered, as evidenced by the Ådalen shootings in 1931, where the military was called in as reinforcement during a violent labor dispute, killing five. In rural areas, the detective work were also often rudimentary. Accordingly, the Swedish State Police (statspolisen) was established in 1932, which would complement the municipal police.

=== Nationalisation ===
The Swedish police continued to be organised under local government control for more than 30 years. The lack of co-ordination made police work difficult on a national level, and ineffective in an increasingly mobile world, which prompted the nationalisation of the Swedish police in 1965. The police became more centralized and now organised under the Ministry of Justice in three levels. The National Police Board (Rikspolisstyrelsen) was the central administrative authority, primarily tasked with coordinating and supporting the local police. The local police was reduced to 119 districts, led by a District Police Commissioner, answering to a Chief Commissioner at the County Administrative Board. In 1998, the number of police districts was further reduced and divided along county lines into 21 local police authorities. On 1 January 2015, the police reorganised again into a unified agency, with the Swedish Security Service becoming a fully independent agency; the biggest overhaul of the Swedish police since it was nationalized in 1965. The new authority was created to address shortcomings in the organisation of the division of duties and responsibilities, to reduce differences between police regions, ease governance and increase accountability. The reorganisation is expected to last several years.

== Tasks and objectives ==
The role of the police is described in the Police Act of 1984. The Act states that the police should prevent crime, monitor public order and safety, carry out criminal investigations, provide protection, information and other assistance to the public, along with other responsibilities as prescribed under special provisions. This is supplemented with the annual "appropriation directions" (regleringsbrev) issued by the Government, which specify the agency's main tasks and goals for the year. The Swedish police also carry out a number of administrative functions, such as the issuing of passports, national identity cards and various kinds of permits and licenses. A permit is for example required when arranging a protest march or holding a public event, such as a concert. Permits are also required for using public space to sell goods, serve food or beverages. Individuals also have the right to request extracts from their criminal records, which is asked for by a growing number of prospective employers and is required by law prior to employment at schools or daycare centers.

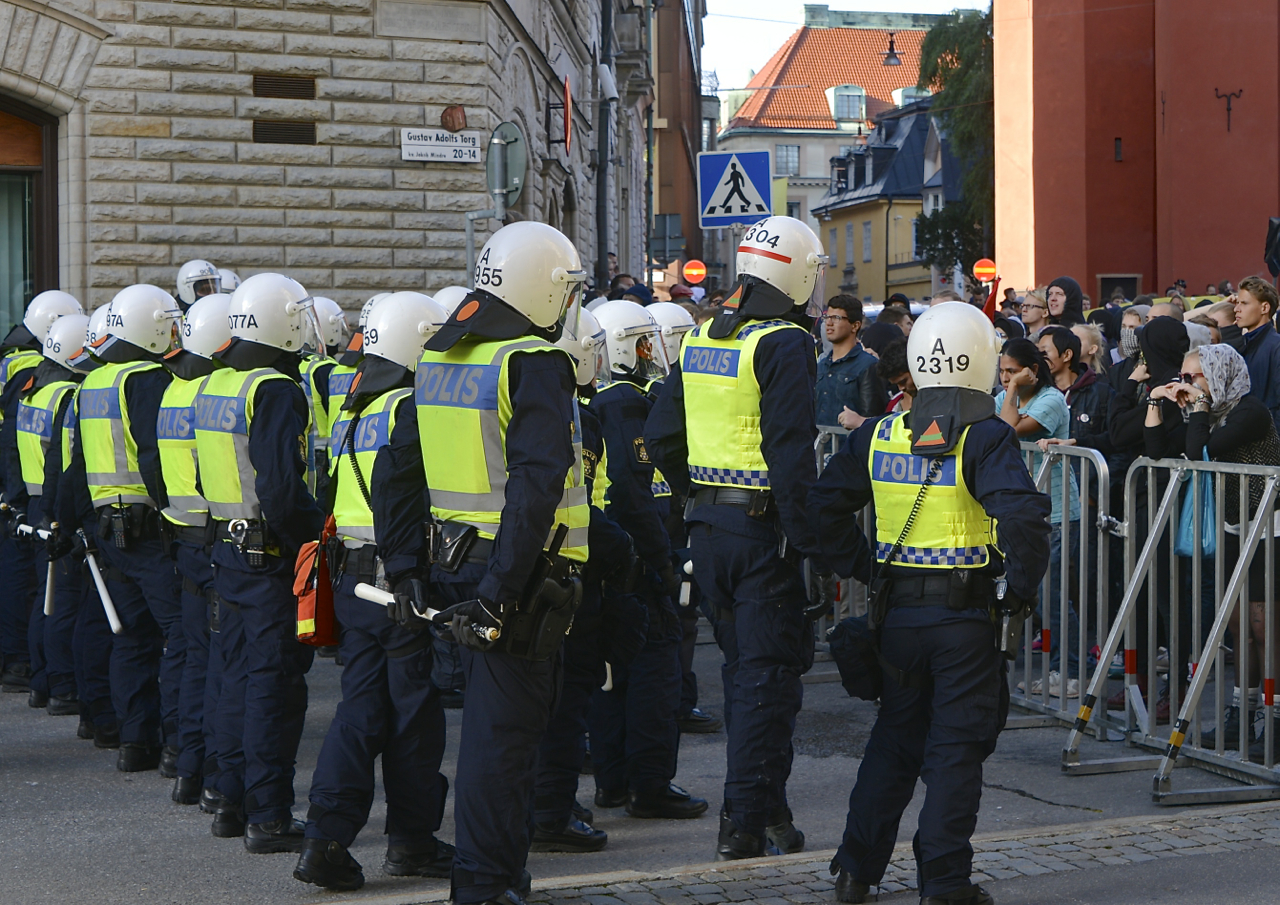
Policing a rally, 2014

In 2014, close to 230,000 criminal record extracts were ordered by the public — almost double that of 2009. The Swedish police also reviewed about 68,000 applications for firearms licenses that same year, which was an increase from the previous year by over 20 percent. Approximately 1.5 million passports and over 200,000 ID cards were issued, and more than 23,000 applications to use public space were received. There were more than 6,000 applications for demonstrations or public gatherings in 2014 (up from 2,700 in 2013). The number of cases reported to the police have stayed about the same during 2010–2015, with 980,502 crimes reported in 2014. In recent years, about 38 percent of the total amount of resource time for the investigation and prosecution of crimes fell within the category of violent crimes, even though it only accounted for approximately 10 percent of all cases. The largest number of reported cases fall within the category of vandalism and various kinds of theft offenses. This category also has the lowest proportion of crimes investigated. In a study made by Swedish National Council for Crime Prevention in 2014, the number of legal proceedings per 1,000 inhabitants was about the same level in Sweden as in other comparable European countries.

== Organisation ==
=== Organisational structure ===
Swedish government authorities enjoy a high degree of independence. Under the 1974 Instrument of Government, neither the Government nor individual ministers have the right to influence how an agency decide in a particular case or on the application of legislation. This also applies to the Swedish police, who instead is governed by general policy instruments, such as laws passed by the Riksdag and by the appointment of executives. The Swedish Police Authority is led by a National Police Commissioner, who is appointed by the Government and has the sole responsibility for all activities of the police. The Commissioner holds regular meetings with a non-executive Public Council to satisfy the need for transparency, and is assisted by the Commissioner's Office, tasked with managerial support and performance management. The agency is organised into seven police regions and eight national departments. Six of the eight national departments are responsible for various support processes needed for day-to-day operations (e.g. communications, finance and human resources). The other two are the National Forensics Centre and National Operations Department. Furthermore, there is an internal auditing unit, reporting directly to the Commissioner, and the Special Investigations Division. The internal auditing unit reviews and proposes changes to internal control and governance of the agency, while the Special Investigations Division investigates professional misconduct. In 2020, the Swedish Police Authority had roughly 34,000 employees, of which 13,000 were civilian employees, making it one of the largest government agencies in Sweden. The number of employees has increased by approximately 18% since 2004. The biggest union is the Swedish Police Union with about 20,500 active members.

Swedish Police Authority organizational chart (Note: Based on an organizational chart published by the Swedish Police Authority in 2015)

National; Police; Commissioner
Public; Council
Internal auditing
Commissioner's; Office
West; Region	Nat. Operations; Department	Human Resources; Department
South; Region	Communications; Dept	Special Investigations
East Region	Nat. Forensic Centre	IT; Department
Stockholm Region	Finance; Dept
Bergslagen Region	Development Dept	Legal; Department
Central; Region
North; Region

Management Support Core activity

=== Public council ===
The Government also appoints a 15-member non-executive council, alongside the Commissioner, to satisfy the need for transparency and citizen participation. The commissioner serves as chairman of the council and has an obligation to keep the council informed of the activities of the police, especially on matters concerning professional misconduct. The council should in turn monitor and give counsel to the police. It is required to meet six times per year and must be composed of at least one member from each party serving the Riksdag, and should beyond that proportionally reflect the election results. Police regions are also similarly mandated to have a public council, but are instead led by a Regional Police Chief.

=== National Operations Department ===
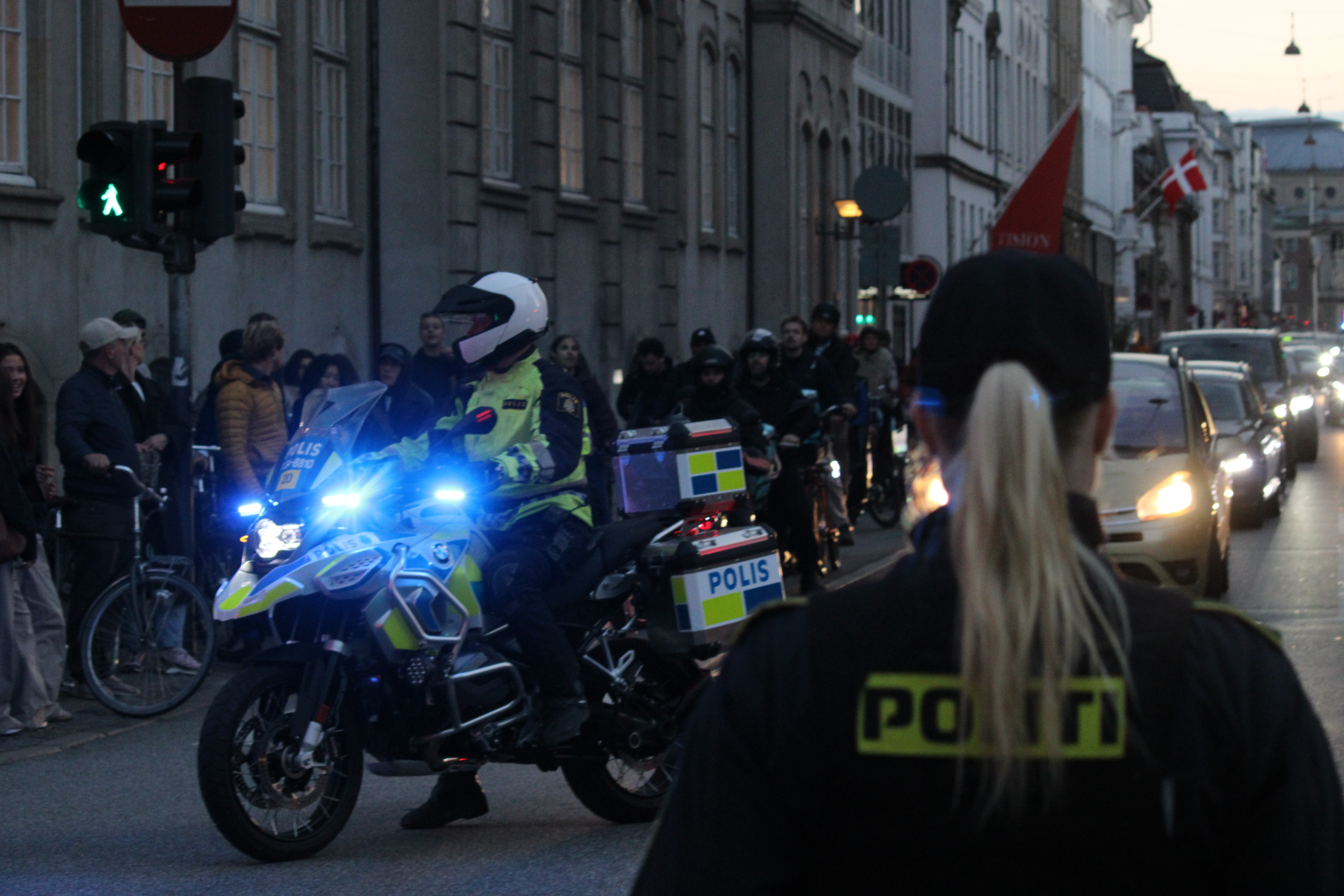
Swedish police police motorcycle and Danish police officer in Copenhagen during a joint task, 2025

The National Operations Department (Nationella operativa avdelningen) is tasked with assisting the local police regions and is in charge of international police cooperation and all national operations. The department has the power to allocate extra resources, if needed, and has a mandate to initiate nationwide operations and activities. It is also responsible for investigating crimes as prescribed by law to be conducted at the national level, such as corruption and war crimes. Furthermore, it handles all contacts with the Swedish Security Service, the Armed Forces and the National Defence Radio Establishment, and manages sensitive information about terrorism and signals intelligence. The department acts like as a secretariat for the Swedish Economic Crime Authority, and also supervises the National Task Force, along with police aviation, witness protection, undercover operations, border control operations, complex computer crimes, the bomb disposal units and some criminal intelligence operations (regarding e.g. serious organised crime).

=== Police regions and subdivisions ===
The agency is organised into seven police regions, based on the geographical boundaries of several counties, where each region has an overall responsibility for the police work in their geographical area. The work is organised under a regional secretariat, operations unit, an investigations unit and intelligence unit—all led by a Regional Police Chief. Police regions generally investigate crime without a strong local connection and less common crimes, requiring specialized knowledge or the use of special surveillance methods or technologies not typically available at lower levels in the agency. Police regions encompass approximately 1,900 employees in the Bergslagen Region, with around 830,000 inhabitants, up to 7,400 employees in the Stockholm Region, with a population of 2.18 million. There are also 27 police districts—organised under the regions—tasked with leading, coordinating, monitoring and analysing the operational activities in their geographical area, which is typically based on the boundaries of a county. The work is organised under a secretariat, an investigations unit and intelligence unit, plus a unit for the local police areas—all led by a District Police Chief, who in turn answer to a Regional Police Chief. The districts are responsible for, inter alia, serious crime or more complex criminal investigations (e.g. murder) and other cases where it may be inappropriate for the local police to handle investigations, for example sex crimes or cases involving domestic violence. At the bottom of the organisational ladder there are 85-90 local police areas, forming the bulk of the police. Local police areas are based on the boundaries of one or more municipalities, or in the case of larger metropolitan areas, several boroughs. The local police is responsible for the majority of all police interventions, general crime prevention, the traffic police, as well as basic criminal investigation duties. There are between 50 and 180 employees in a typical local police area, or at least one local police officer per 5,000 inhabitants in disadvantaged areas. In 2014, a government report expected that the local police would account for about 50 per cent of all police interventions, post-reorganisation.

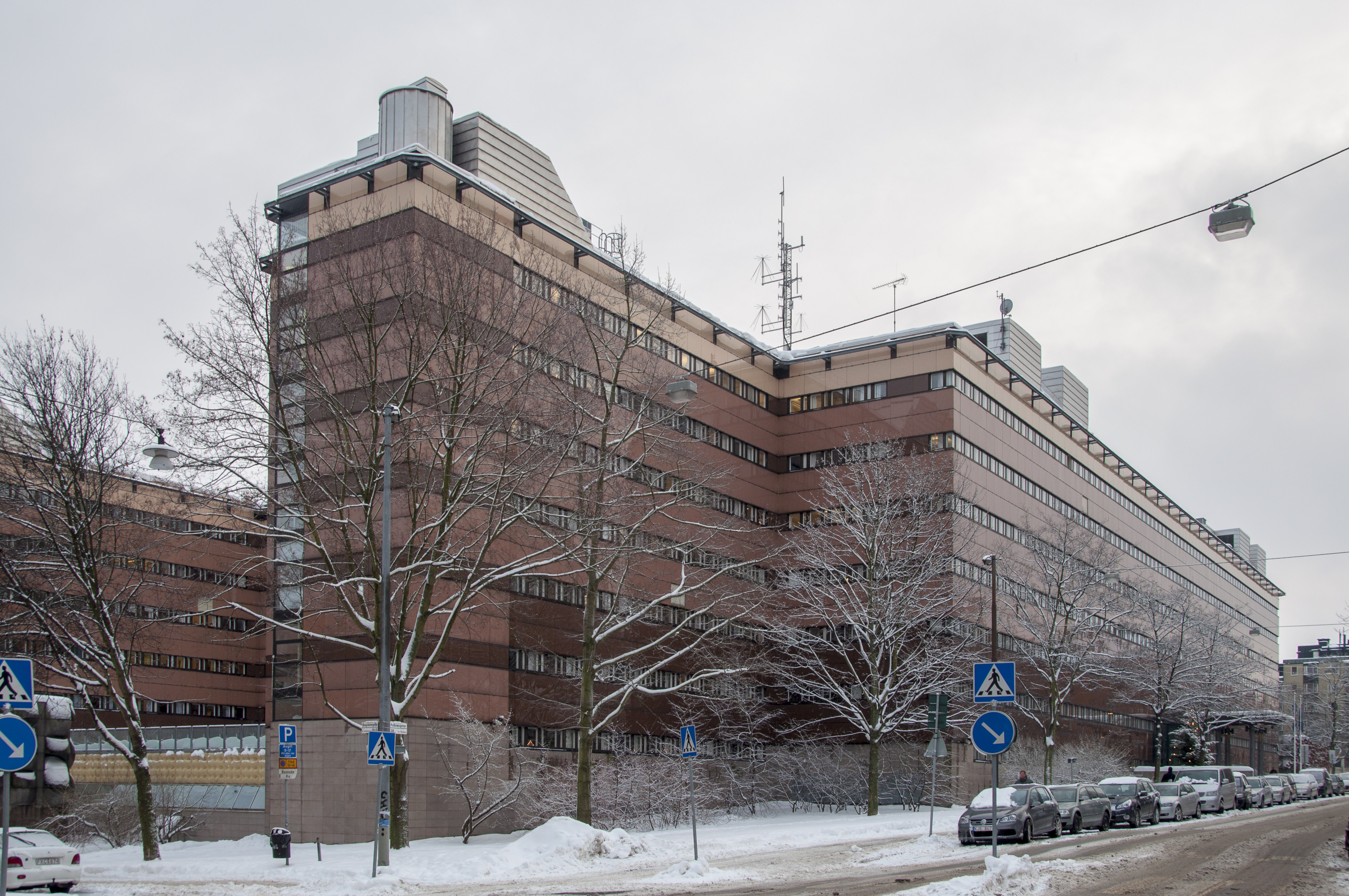
Police headquarters in Stockholm, 2011

Police regions

North – Västernorrland, Jämtland, Västerbotten and Norrbotten with offices in Umeå
Central – Uppsala, Västmanland and Gävleborg with offices in Uppsala
Bergslagen – Värmland, Örebro and Dalarna with offices in Örebro
East – Södermanland, Östergötland and Jönköping with offices in Linköping
West – Halland and Västra Götaland with offices in Gothenburg
South – Kronoberg, Kalmar, Blekinge and Skåne with offices in Malmö
Stockholm – Stockholm and Gotland with offices in Stockholm

== Specialists ==
The Swedish police have a number of specially trained police officers equipped to deal with many different tasks, either organised under the National Operations Department or under a police region.

=== Tactical units ===
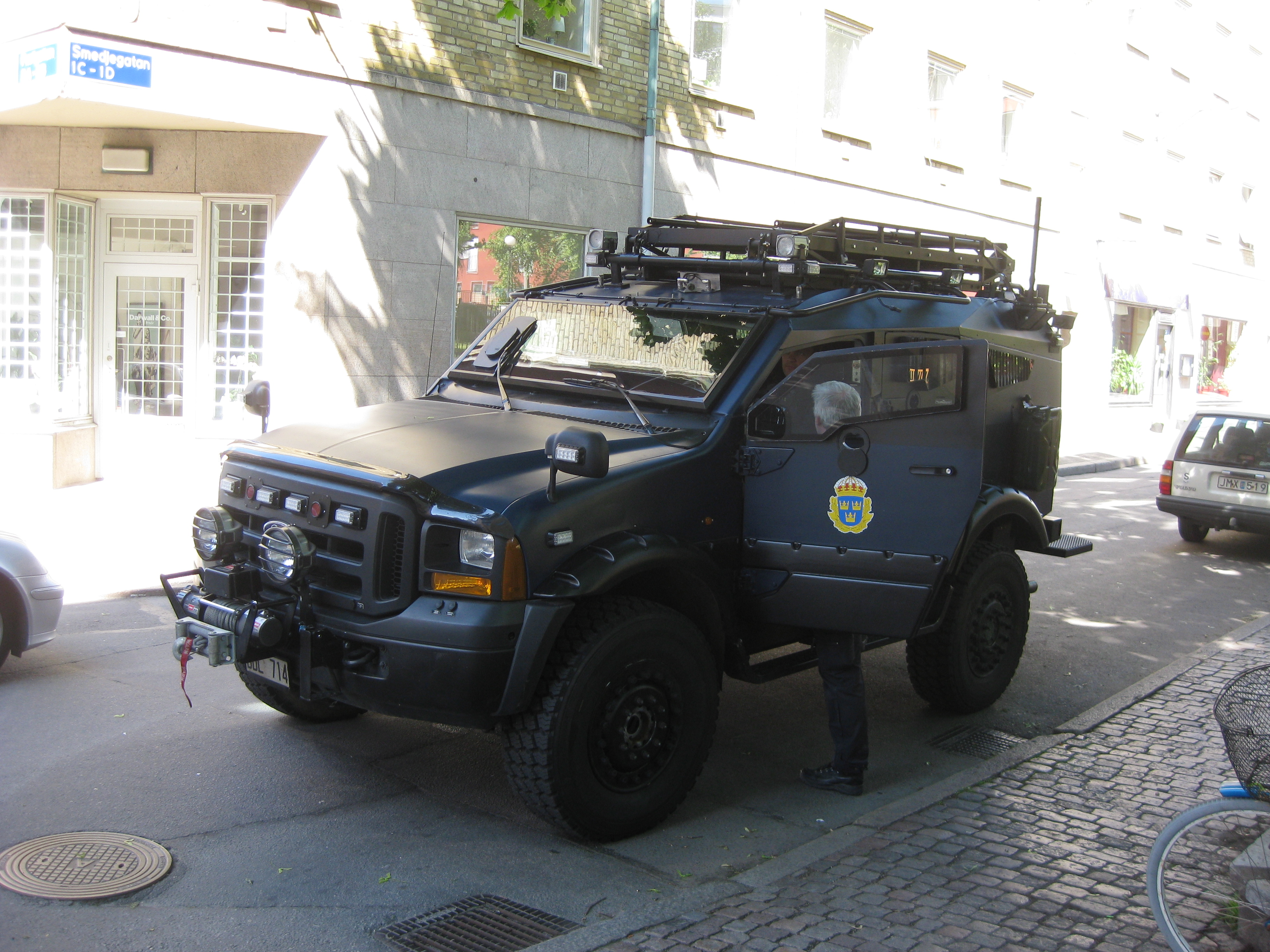
Plasan Sand Cat, previously used by Piketen.

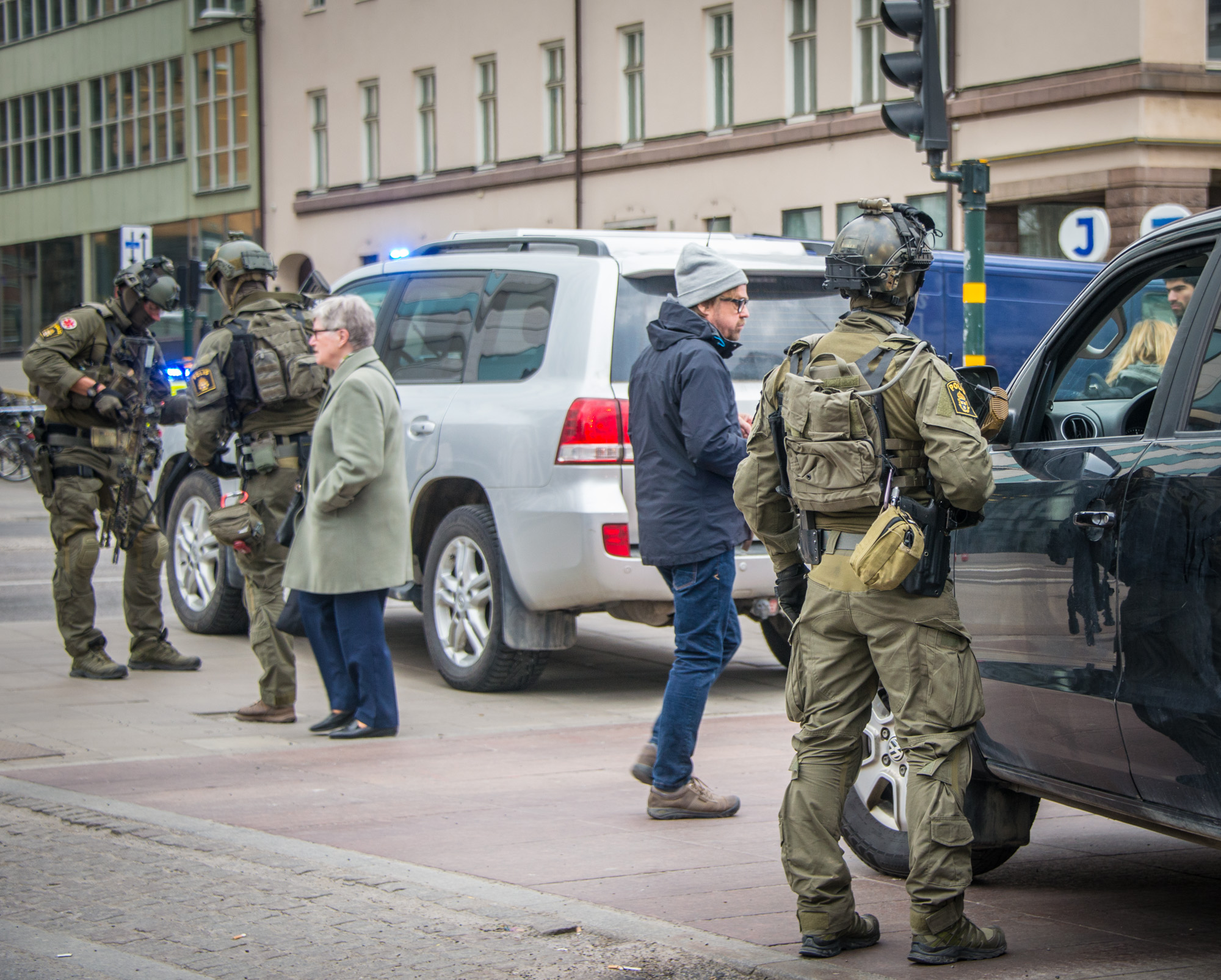
Operators from the National Task Force during the 2017 Stockholm truck attack.

In 2015 the Police reorganised its tactical capabilities under an umbrella known as NIK (Swedish: Nationella Insatskonceptet, lit. 'National Intervention Concept'). NIK established a framework for the existing regional units (then known as Piketen) and the National Task Force, it also added regional intervention teams in the non-metropolitan units.

The main tactical units today are the Reinforced Regional Task Forces (formerly known as Piketen, from the French word piquet) which are tactical response units based in the major metropolitan areas of Stockholm, Gothenburg and Malmö. These units are sometimes seconded to neighbouring districts in connection with rapidly evolving events. These units were formed in the wake of two major incidents. On 23 August 1973, a robbery in Stockholm devolved into a hostage-taking situation and subsequent six-day siege by the police. The phrase Stockholm syndrome was coined by the criminologist and psychiatrist Nils Bejerot in connection with the protracted siege, as a state where hostages start to sympathize with their captor. One and a half years later the Red Army Faction occupied the West German Embassy in Stockholm, killing two hostages. Subsequently, the units were formed in 1979 as the regular police force were deemed insufficiently trained and ill-equipped to deal with similar events. Today the unit is used for particularly difficult or dangerous operations and often work in teams with a crisis negotiator.

The National Task Force (Nationella insatsstyrkan) is a national counter terrorism/high-risk intervention unit under the command of the National Operations Department. It was originally formed in 1991 solely as a counter-terrorist task force in the wake of the assassination of Prime Minister Olof Palme, on the recommendations put forward by a 1988 Government inquiry. It has evolved into a national police resource deployed in extremely dangerous situations, e.g. high-risk interventions, search and surveillance operations, hostage situations, tactical negotiations and various kinds of underwater operations.

=== Other notable units and specialists ===
==== Marine police ====
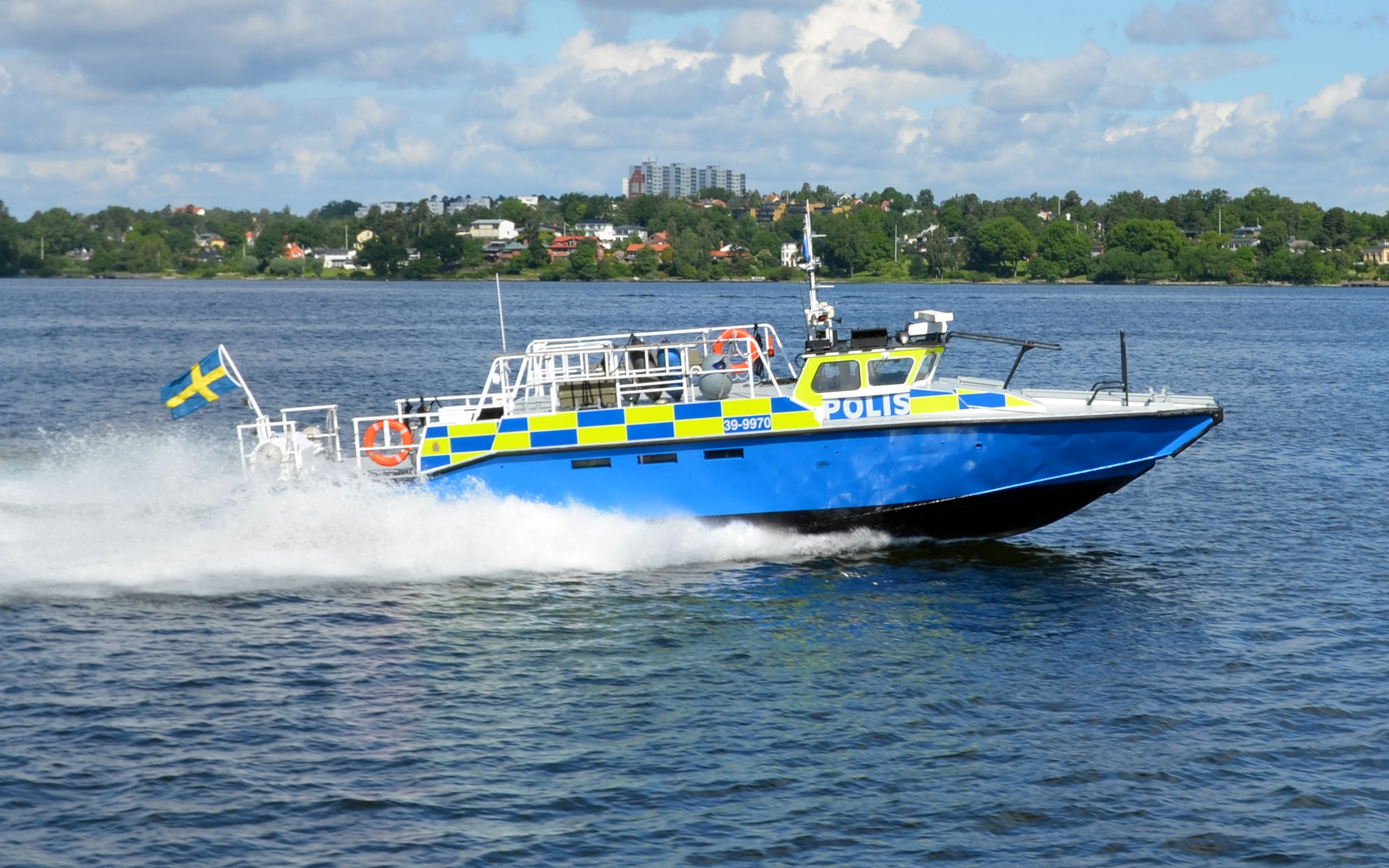
CB90-class police boat, 2012

The Swedish Marine Police (sjöpolisen) have around 12 boats in total at their disposal. Most common types are high-performance RIBs, capable of speeds up to 60 knots, or CB90-class boats — 15-metre patrol vessels, capable of speeds of up to 40 knots. There are about 80 marine police officers in total, half of which work only during the summer. The marine police coordinate with several other agencies and organisations, like the Coast Guard, Customs Service and the Sea Rescue Society.

==== Police aviation ====
The Swedish Police Air Support Unit (polisflyget)—organised the National Operations Department—employs approximately 60 personnel, currently operating seven Bell 429 helicopters from five different bases; ranging from Boden in the far north to Östersund, Stockholm, Gothenburg and Malmö in the south. Until 2015–2016 the fleet consisted of six Eurocopter EC135. The helicopter units are fully crewed 24 hours a day, often tasked with providing aerial surveillance, assisting in vehicle pursuits and in search and rescue operations. The helicopters are also used for transport, to reduce time to target during critical interventions by bomb technicians and officers of the National Task Force. In 2018, the police purchased two additional Bell 429 helicopters increasing their fleet to nine. The two Bell 429s will reinforce the police's aviation and counter terrorism capabilities with one to be based in Stockholm alongside the National Task Force and the other one in Skåne. Black Hawk helicopters, operated by the Armed Forces and on 24-hour stand-by, are also available to the National Task Force, EOD and Regional Task Forces at their requests.

==== Mounted police and police dogs ====
There are about 400 police dogs with as many dog handlers, available to all police districts and used approximately 25,000–30,000 times in total per year. Police Region West has a national responsibility to coordinate, develop and review the regulatory framework for dog handlers. The region is also responsible for the dog training school. The most common dog breeds are German Shepherd Dogs (70%) and Belgian Malinois (20%). There are also mounted police forces in the counties of Stockholm, Västra Götaland and Skåne, with approximately 60 horses in total or twenty horses in each mounted unit, which can be dispatched to other counties. Operations are planned and carried out locally, according to a joint national concept developed by Police Region Stockholm.

== Oversight ==
A number of sanctions and oversight functions exist to ensure that the application of legislation and the exercise of public authority are in compliance with regulations. The most serious cases of professional misconduct may be prosecuted under the Swedish Penal Code as misuse of office/dereliction of duty (tjänstefel), carrying a maximum penalty of six years imprisonment. Other provisions may also apply. Less serious cases of misconduct or negligent performance of duties may lead to disciplinary action in the form of a warning, wage deduction or ultimately dismissal. (Note: See also the official translation at the Government of Sweden website of the Swedish Penal Code (1 May 1999), Chapter 20, Section 1) A common misconception about police misconduct in Sweden is that investigations are carried out by colleagues, which is not the case. The Swedish police is subject to oversight by several external authorities:

- Chancellor of Justice – Provides a general oversight function on behalf of the Government, designed to ensure that officials are in compliance with regulations.
- Commission on Security and Integrity Protection – Monitors the use of secret surveillance techniques, assumed identities and other associated activities, as well as the processing of personal data.
- Data Protection Authority – Monitors the use of registers and the processing of personal data.
- National Audit Office – Responsible for efficiency audits of the police.
- Parliamentary Ombudsman – Ensures compliance with laws and other statutes governing authorities on behalf of the Riksdag, with particular attention to abuses of authority vis-a-vis individuals.
- Work Environment Authority – Responsible for issues relating to the working environment.

Additionally, internal review and control is managed by the Special Investigations Division (Avdelningen för särskilda utredningar), an independent division within the Swedish Police Authority. The division is responsible for investigating crimes committed by police employees, including civilian employees and off-duty officers, and complaints filed against prosecutors, judges and police students. The head of the division is appointed by the Government and operations are funded as a separate appropriation item. Officers work closely with a special chamber of prosecutors reporting directly to the Prosecutor-General of Sweden, tasked with leading investigations and deciding which cases should be processed. The division is also obliged to provide support to other external supervisory authorities. In 2013, the police received 6,212 complaints of misconduct, of which the most common complaint was misuse of office. Other common complaints were assault and theft. The prosecutor decided not to initiate an investigation in 71 per cent of the cases. The matter of supervision of the police have been the subject of several Government inquiries, most recently by a parliamentary committee in June 2015, which recommended the creation of a new supervisory body. As of August 2015, the recommendation is under consideration by various referral bodies.

== Police training ==
In 1870, the police in Stockholm introduced a one-year practice-oriented education. Before this, new recruits studied laws and regulations on their own, while they got a very elementary introduction to the job by their colleagues and some lectures by officers, lasting in total only a few weeks. The country's first police academy was established in Uppsala in 1910, partly financed by local government. Similar schools were established at later dates in the rest of the country. In 1925, with the establishment of the Police Act, the Government took over the Police School in Stockholm, established eight years prior. This school later became the National Police Academy (Polishögskolan), located at a former military base in Solna, under the stewardship of the National Police Board. In the early 1970s the education consisted of 40 weeks of theoretical and practical training, followed by two years of field training. In 1998, the Government launched a new police education programme lasting two years, followed by six months of paid workplace practice at a local police authority, which made you qualified to apply for the position as a Police Constable.

Since 2015, the National Police Academy is entirely outsourced by the Swedish Police Authority and training is carried out at five universities: Södertörn, Umeå, Växjö, Malmö and Borås. The training now covers five terms, and the last two include six months of paid workplace practice as a Police Trainee (equivalent to two and a half years of full-time studying). In addition to basic eligibility for higher education, citizenship, and some specific entry requirements, applicants must have a drivers licence, be able to swim, have the personal qualities deemed necessary for the profession and meet the physical requirements of the job. In 2013, of the nearly seven thousand applicants, just over 300 of them matriculated into their first year of school, with a third of them being women. Candidates for the role of police chief must have a university degree relevant to the position or be a graduate of the National Police Academy, or both. There is also a special 18-month leadership training programme organised by the police, available for prospective police chiefs. Prior to 1999, regulations called for all chiefs of police to have a law degree. This requirement was dropped to allow for broader hiring practices and in an effort to expand the expertise within the police. Roughly 40 percent of 200 police chiefs surveyed in 2013 had a law degree.

== Women police ==
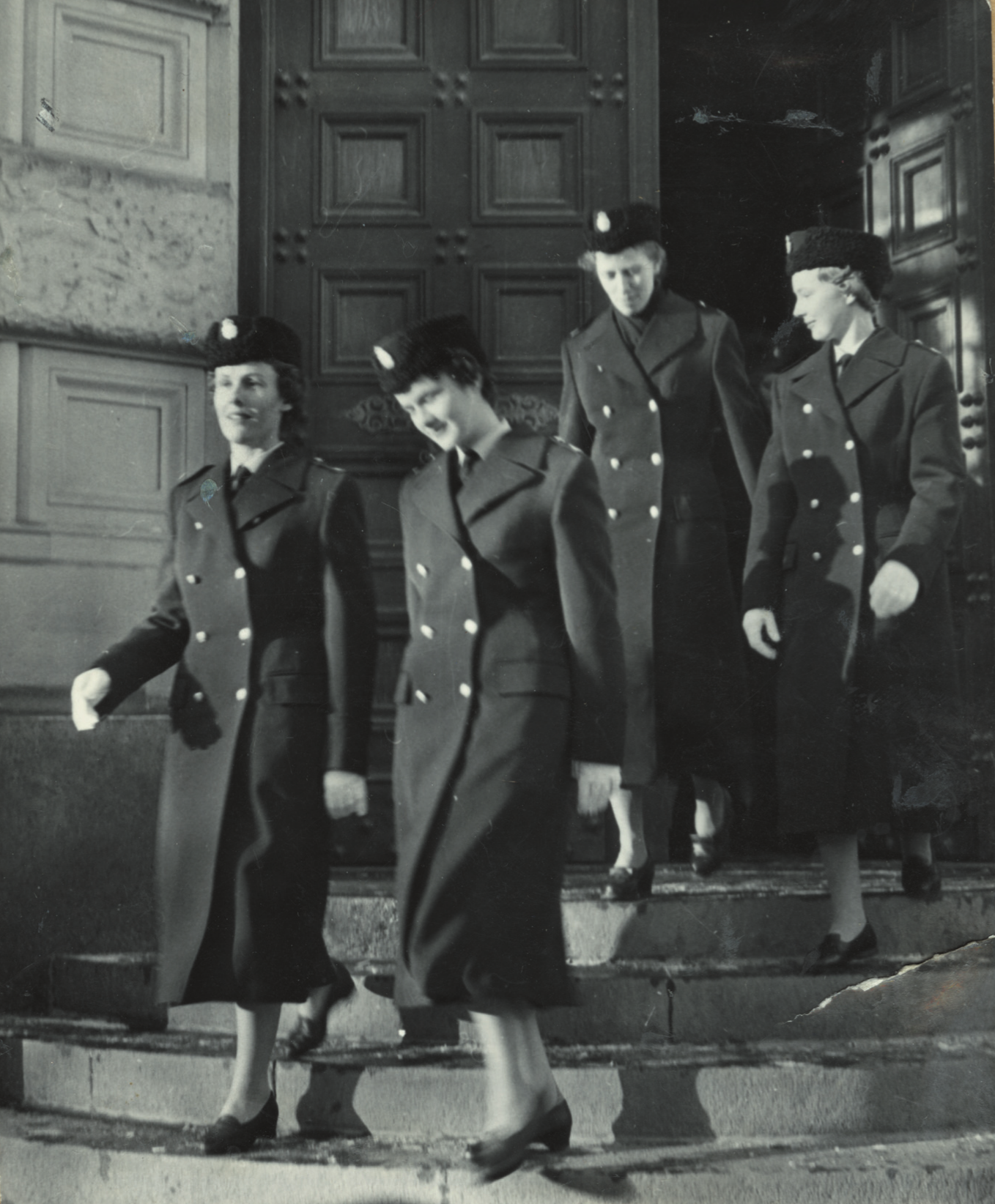
Women police in Stockholm, 1958

In 1908, the first group of women were employed by the police in Stockholm. They worked mainly with women and children, and were often experienced nurses serving as jail guards. Some were tasked with surveillance of public places, arresting women and children caught stealing. In the subsequent fifty years more women were employed, but remained few overall. It was not until 1957 that the opportunity to become a police constable on patrol duty opened up for women, with the first uniformed police women patrolling the streets of Täby and Vaxholm. In the following year, women started to patrol the streets of Stockholm in a pilot project. The project caused a lot of debate, with some resistance within the police union, and recruitment slowed down in the 1960s. In 1968, the National Police Board decided that all women should be placed in investigation units or on other duties excluding them from patrols and recruitment picked up speed again. This arrangement remained in place until 1971, when a formal decision was made that all men and women should serve on equal terms.

Other notable events for women:

- 1981 – First woman police chief, Karin Värmefjord, was appointed Police Commissioner of Ludvika
- 1990 – First woman forensic police officer
- 1994 – First woman county police chief, Ann-Charlotte Norrås, was appointed Chief Commissioner of Gothenburg County Police
- 1994 – First woman to serve at a tactical unit
- 2005 – First woman to serve as a helicopter pilot
- 2023- First woman to become National Police Commissioner Petra Lundh

In 2011, women accounted for 40 per cent of all employees and 28 per cent of all officers, with 24 per cent women in management. Today, physical requirements are the same for men and women in cardiovascular fitness, but different in terms of body strength. The minimum requirement is equivalent to average-level muscle strength and fitness in men and women.

== Equipment ==
=== Ground vehicles ===
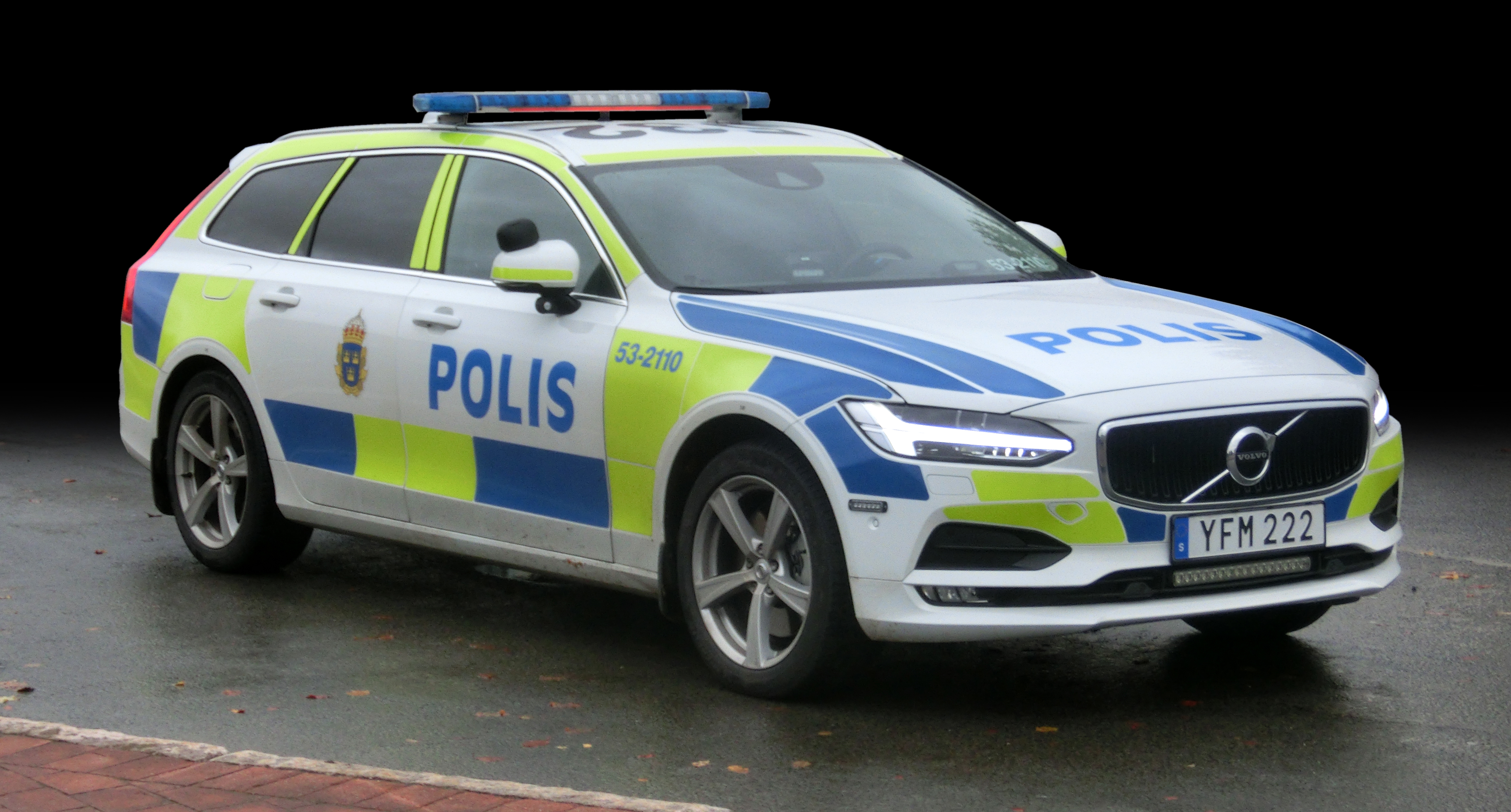
Volvo V90 police car with Battenburg markings, 2017

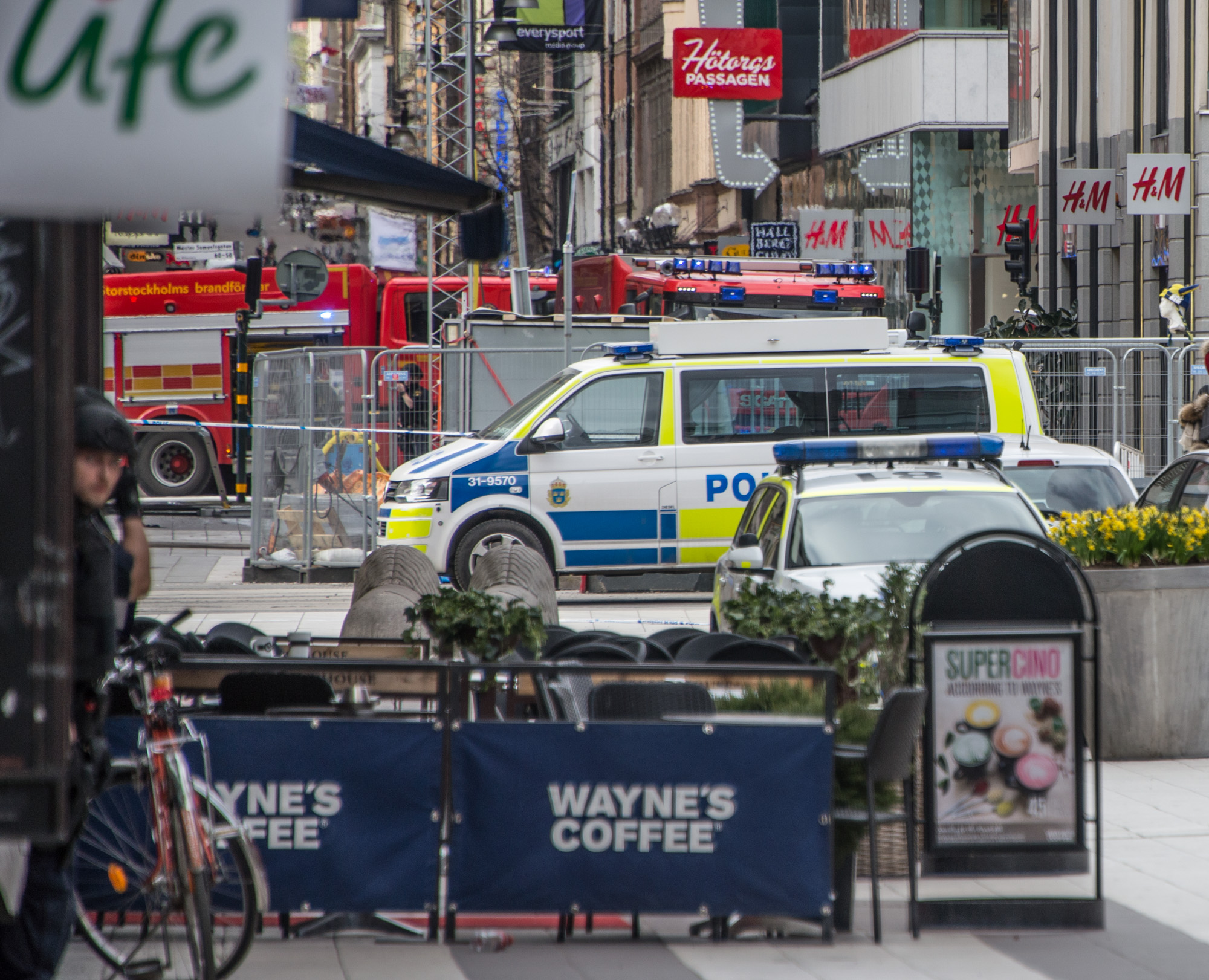
Police at the scene, after the 2017 Stockholm truck attack

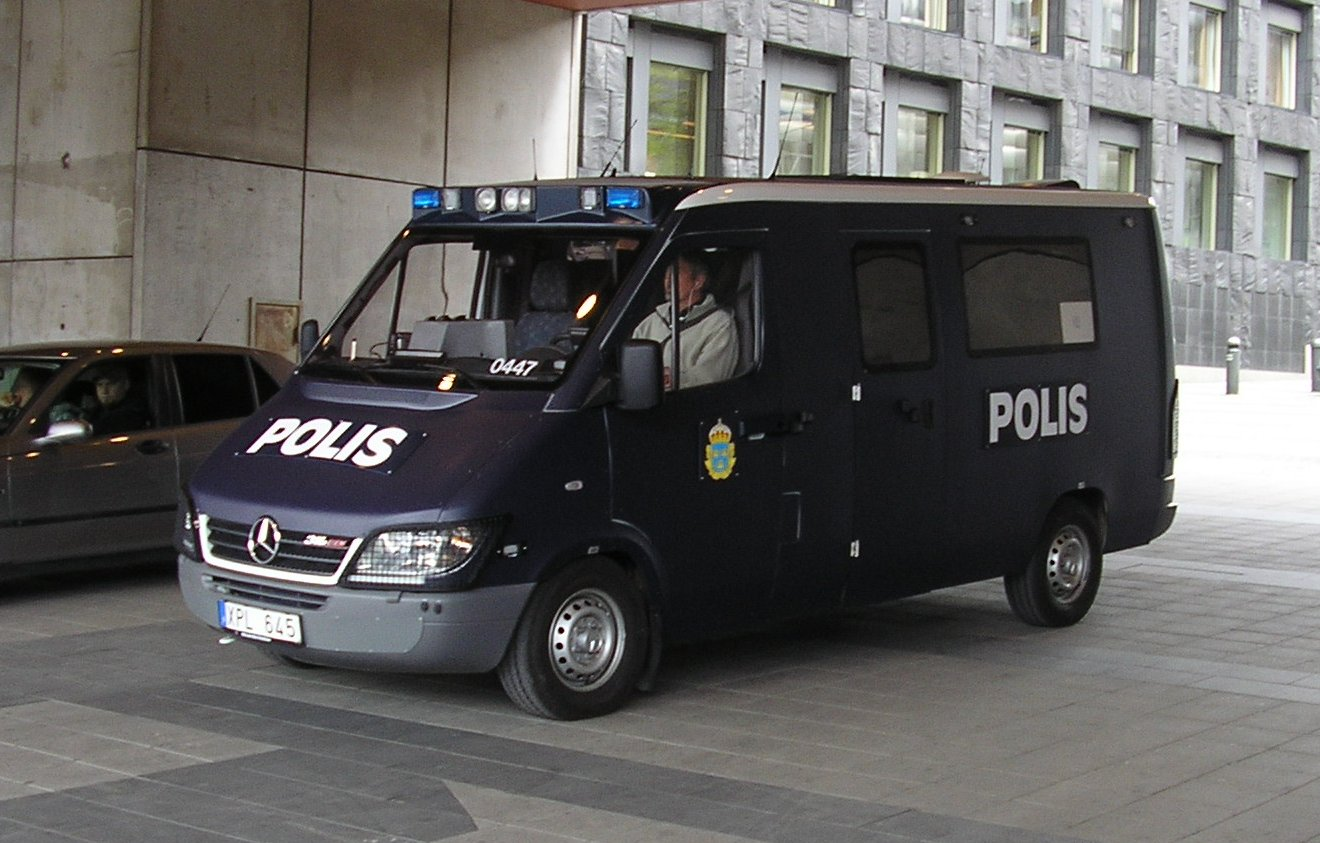
Mercedes Sprinter public order van, 2007

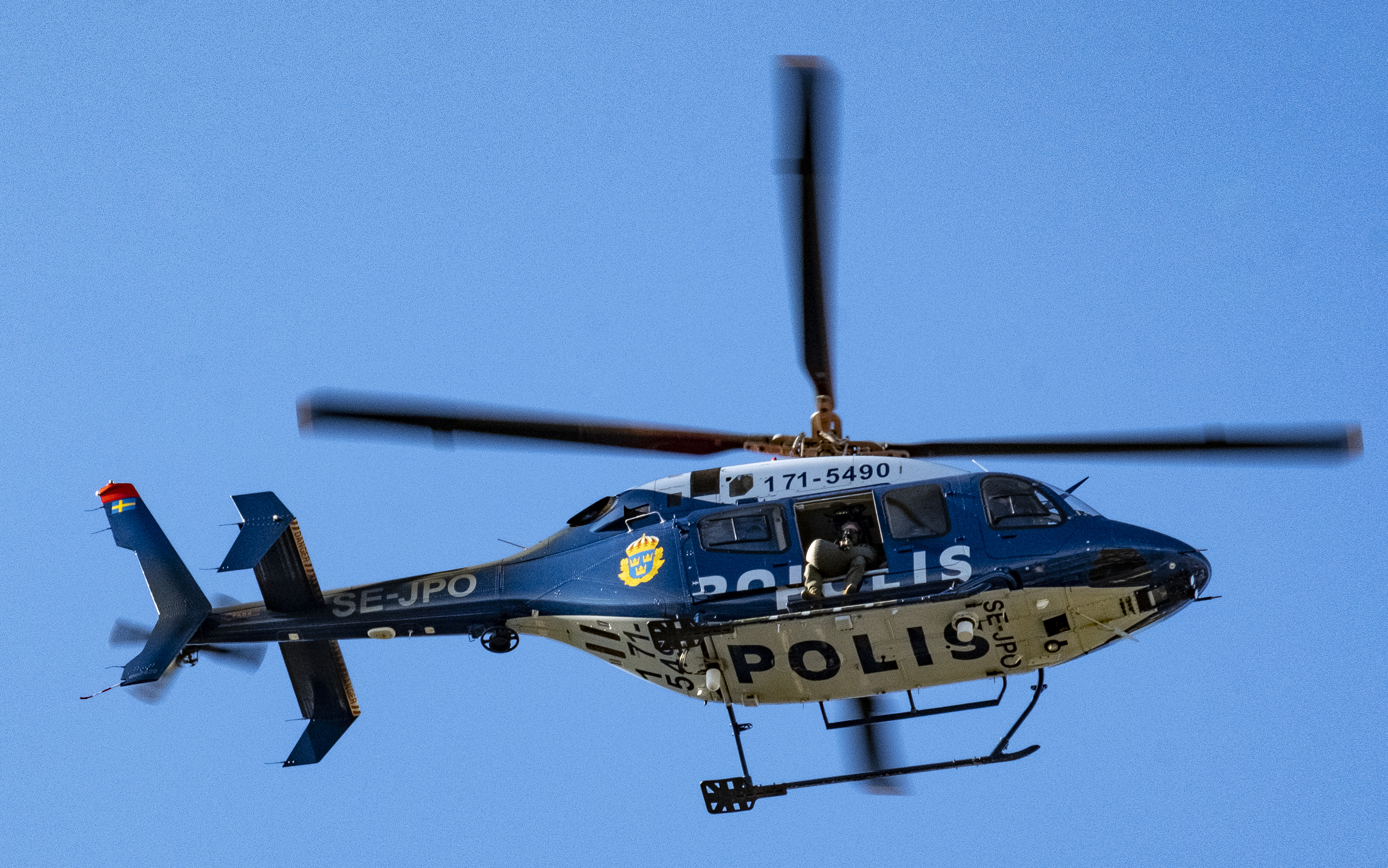
Swedish police with a Bell 429

Swedish procurement legislation, largely based on EU Directives, prohibit discrimination on the basis of nationality, sex, religion, gender and politics. All goods and services supplied to the Swedish police must be procured on the open market.

Accordingly, the Swedish Police Authority has signed framework agreements with six suppliers of police cars, made from a number of brands, including BMW and Mercedes-Benz. Yet in 2013, approximately 85 percent of all cars delivered were Volvos.

Police officers especially favoured the Volvo XC70 because of its handling, durability and high ground clearance, providing for easier ingress and egress. Other common vehicles are the Volkswagen Passat and Volkswagen Transporter.

The Swedish police also has a number of specialty vehicles, such as armoured vehicles for the Reinforced Regional Task Force, and public order vans.

The traffic police share approximately 150 police motorcycles.

In the northern parts of Sweden, police commonly use snowmobiles and work alongside Customs and the Swedish Mountain Rescue Services (Fjällräddningen).

Other police vehicles used by Swedish law enforcement includes bicycles in heavy populated areas and near city centers.

=== Weapons ===
The standard equipment for Swedish police officers includes a handgun, which officers are required to carry whenever they are "on patrol duty" (Swedish: i yttre tjänst, lit. 'in external service').

They are also allowed to carry during "office duty" (Swedish: inre tjänst, lit. 'internal service') when it is for safety reasons (e.g. premises where the public has access or during guard duty).

In 2012, new regulations were introduced allowing officers to carry their firearm loaded with a round in the chamber, to reduce the risk of operator error and accidental firearms discharge in a dangerous situation.

Police officers also routinely carry expandable batons and pepper spray. They may, yet rarely use, tear gas against individuals or in crowd control situations.

A trial of electroshock weapons (TASER X2) took place between 2018 and 2019, with 700 officers trained to use the device. Their use has been continued in the regions where the trials took place.

Model	Type	Caliber	Origin	Notes
SIG Sauer P225	Semi-automatic pistol	9×19mm Parabellum	Germany	Current standard sidearm issued with Speer Gold Dot hollow point bullets; to be replaced by Glock pistols
SIG Sauer P226	Semi-automatic pistol	9×19mm Parabellum	Germany	Current standard sidearm issued with Speer Gold Dot hollow point bullets; to be replaced by Glock pistols
SIG Sauer P228	Semi-automatic pistol	9×19mm Parabellum	Germany	Current standard sidearm issued with Speer Gold Dot hollow point bullets; to be replaced by Glock pistols
SIG Sauer P229	Semi-automatic pistol	9×19mm Parabellum	Germany	Current standard sidearm issued with Speer Gold Dot hollow point bullets; to be replaced by Glock pistols
SIG Sauer P239	Semi-automatic pistol	9×19mm Parabellum	Germany	Current standard sidearm issued with Speer Gold Dot hollow point bullets; to be replaced by Glock pistols
Glock 45	Semi-automatic pistol	9×19mm Parabellum	Austria	Future standard sidearm, with full implementation expected within five years
Glock 17	Semi-automatic pistol	9×19mm Parabellum	Austria	Issued to the Reinforced Regional Task Force and National Task Force
Glock 43	Semi-automatic pistol	9×19mm Parabellum	Austria	Issued to the Reinforced Regional Task Force and National Task Force
Glock 43X	Semi-automatic pistol	9×19mm Parabellum	Austria	Issued to the Reinforced Regional Task Force and National Task Force
Heckler & Koch MP5	Submachine gun	9×19mm Parabellum	Germany	Assigned under special circumstances or in a particularly dangerous situation
LWRC M6	Assault rifle	5.56×45mm NATO	United States	Issued to the Reinforced Regional Task Force and National Task Force
LWRC REPR	Sniper rifle	7.62x51mm NATO	United States	Issued to the National Task Force
Sako TRG M10	Sniper rifle	.338 Lapua Magnum	Finland	Issued to the National Task Force

=== Radio ===
The Swedish police uses a TETRA-based radio communications system, named RAKEL, managed by the Swedish Civil Contingencies Agency. It's also used by other law enforcement agencies and organisations with a responsibility for public safety, replacing more than 200 analogue systems. The system covers 99.84% of Sweden's population and 95% of the territory, and became the standard radio system for the police in 2011.

=== Air vehicles ===
The Swedish police have 5 helicopter bases with a number of helicopters. They primarily use the Eurocopter EC 135.

== Uniform ==
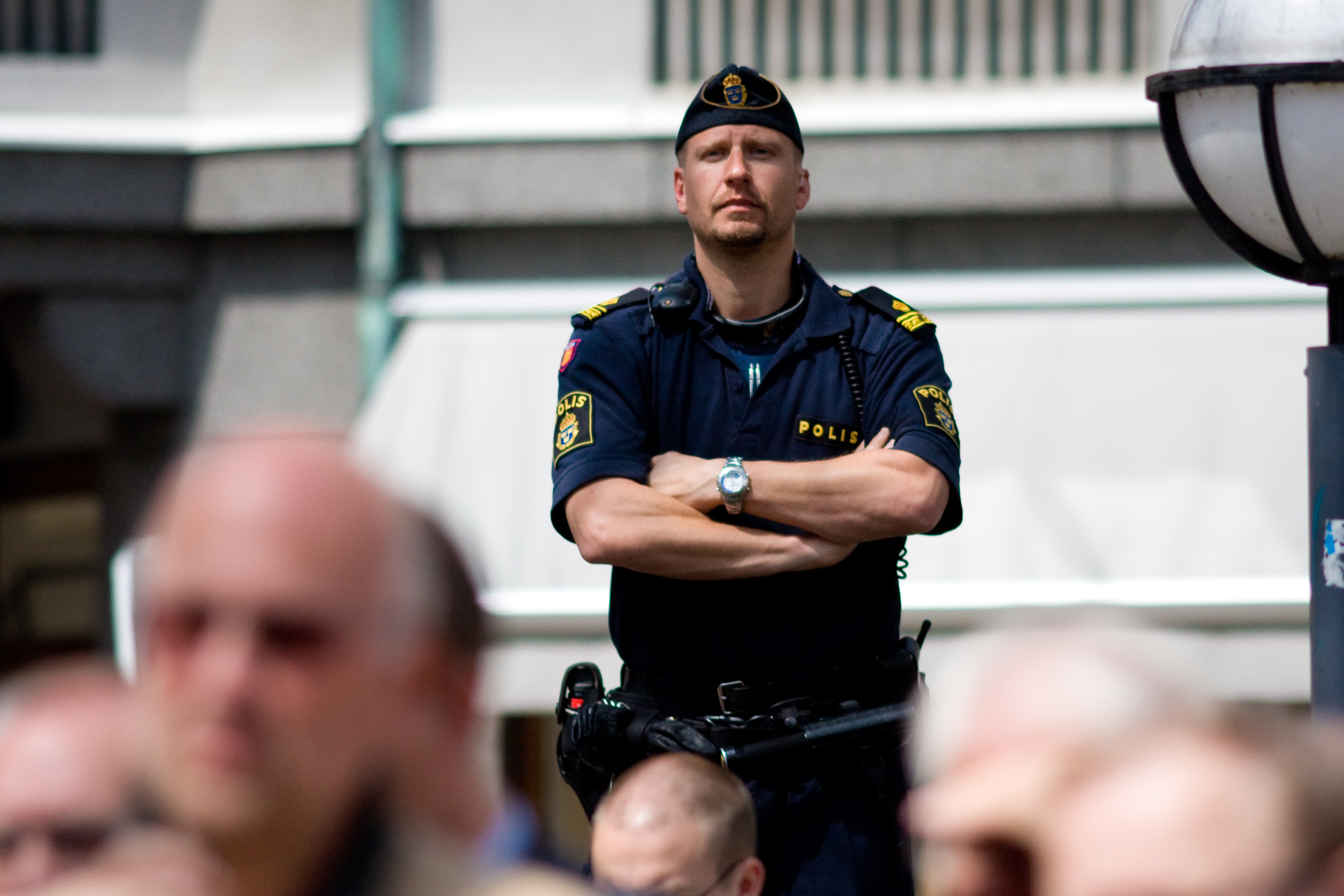
Police Inspector, 2010

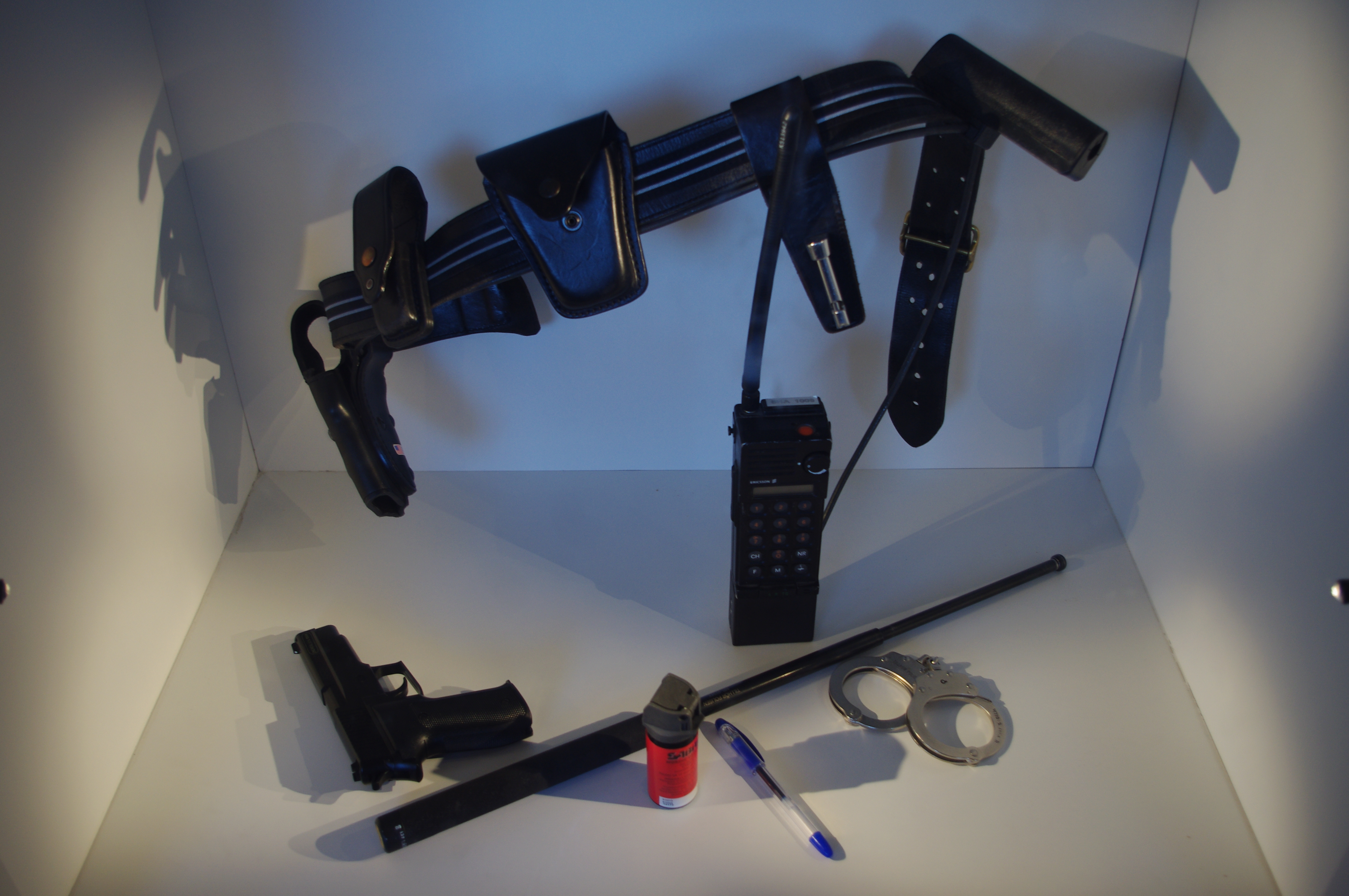
Swedish Police equipment belt

The everyday working uniform consists of combat trousers in a dark-blue fabric with a dark-blue polo shirt or a long sleeve button shirt and black boots.

The long sleeved shirt is worn without tie, with the sleeves rolled up in warm weather.

The trousers are based on a model that was first introduced in 1992, which in turn was inspired by the Swedish Armed Forces' M90 field uniform.

Included in the uniform is a police duty belt consisting of a handgun holster, a helmet fastener, and several pouches for the handcuffs, spare magazines, the pepper spray canister and baton.

The headgear is usually a dark-blue side cap, known as båtmössa ('boat cap'), embellished with yellow-gold piping and a metal cap badge.

There are a number of jackets designed for different tasks and weather situations, most of them in dark-blue. According to the regulations, officers should typically wear hi-visibility vests, unless it is detrimental to the task at hand.

Officers may also wear a light-blue long sleeve dress shirt with a dark-blue tie, usually paired with a dark-blue or white peaked cap, and sometimes worn with dark-blue suit jackets and trousers.

There is also a light-blue short sleeve dress shirt that may be worn open-necked.

White dress shirts are primarily reserved for more formal occasions.

== Ranks ==
2022–present

The following ranks are used from 2022 onward, after the introduction of the Career and Development Paths (Karriär- och Utvecklingsvägar, KUV) system, which added several new ranks and refined the roles of existing ranks:

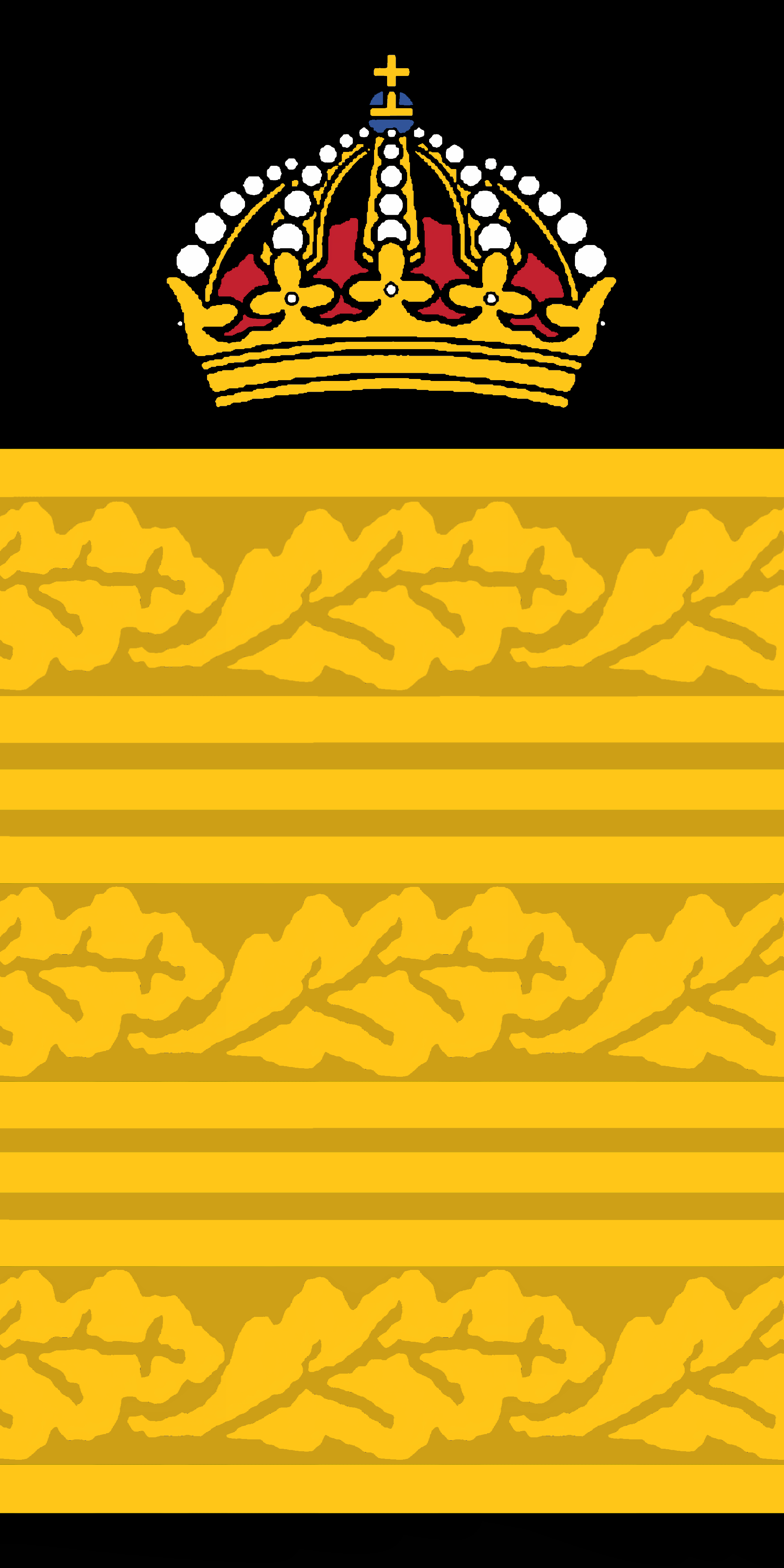
National Police Chief, Security Police Chief (Rikspolischef, Säkerhetspolischef)

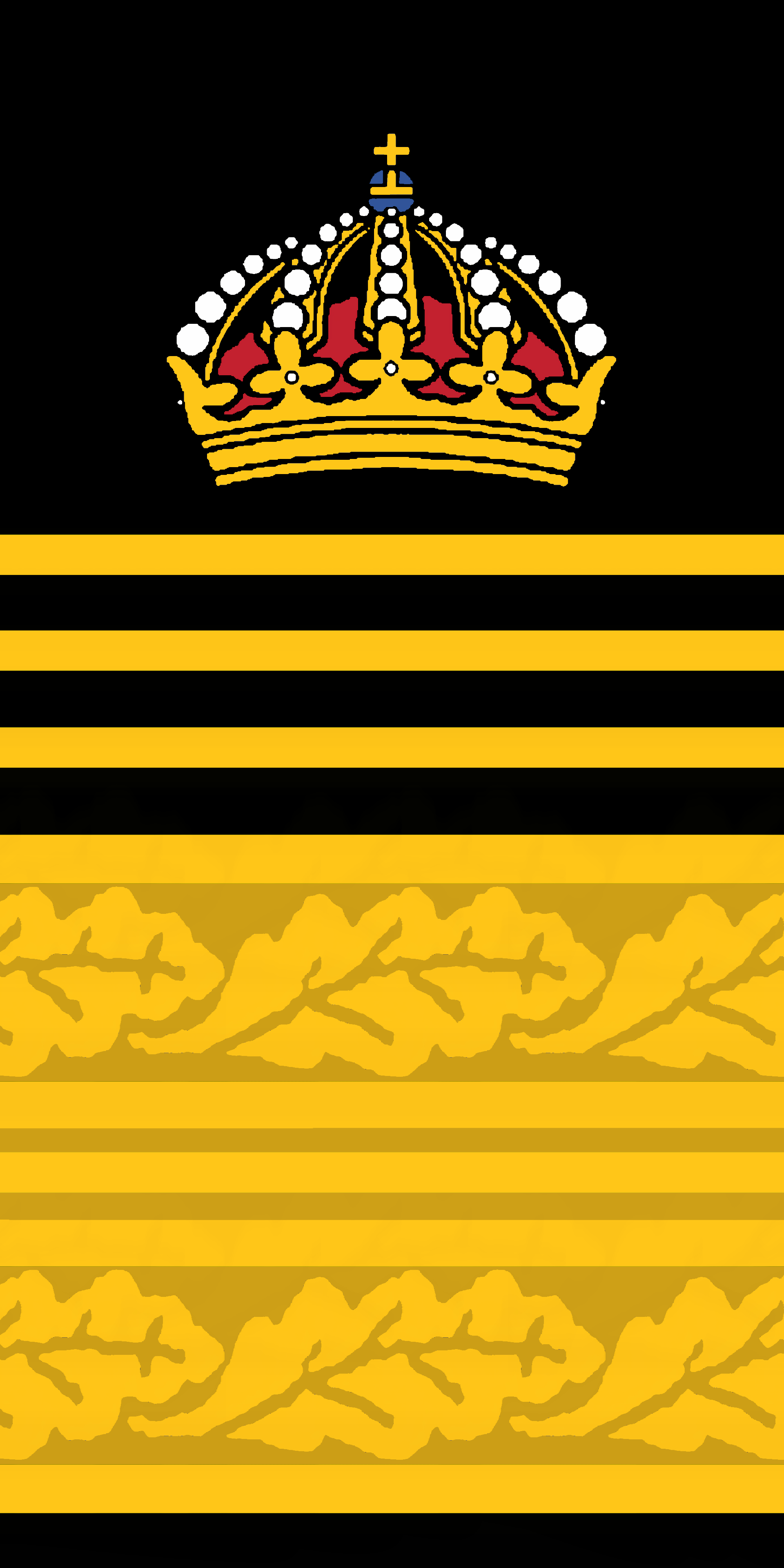
Deputy Chief of the Security Police (Biträdande säkerhetspolischef)

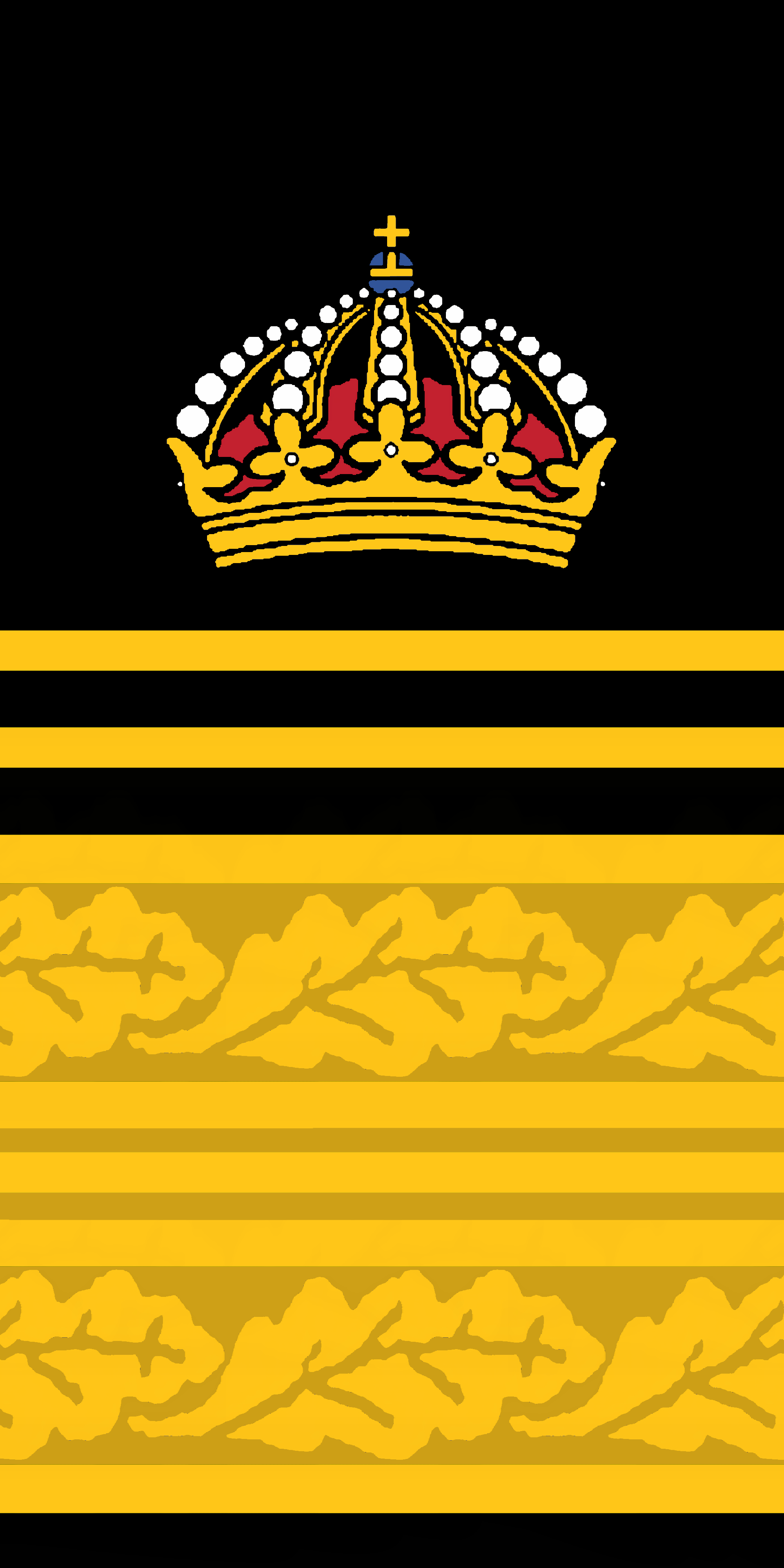
Police Director (Regional Police Chief, Department Chief, or after special appointment) (Polisdirektör)

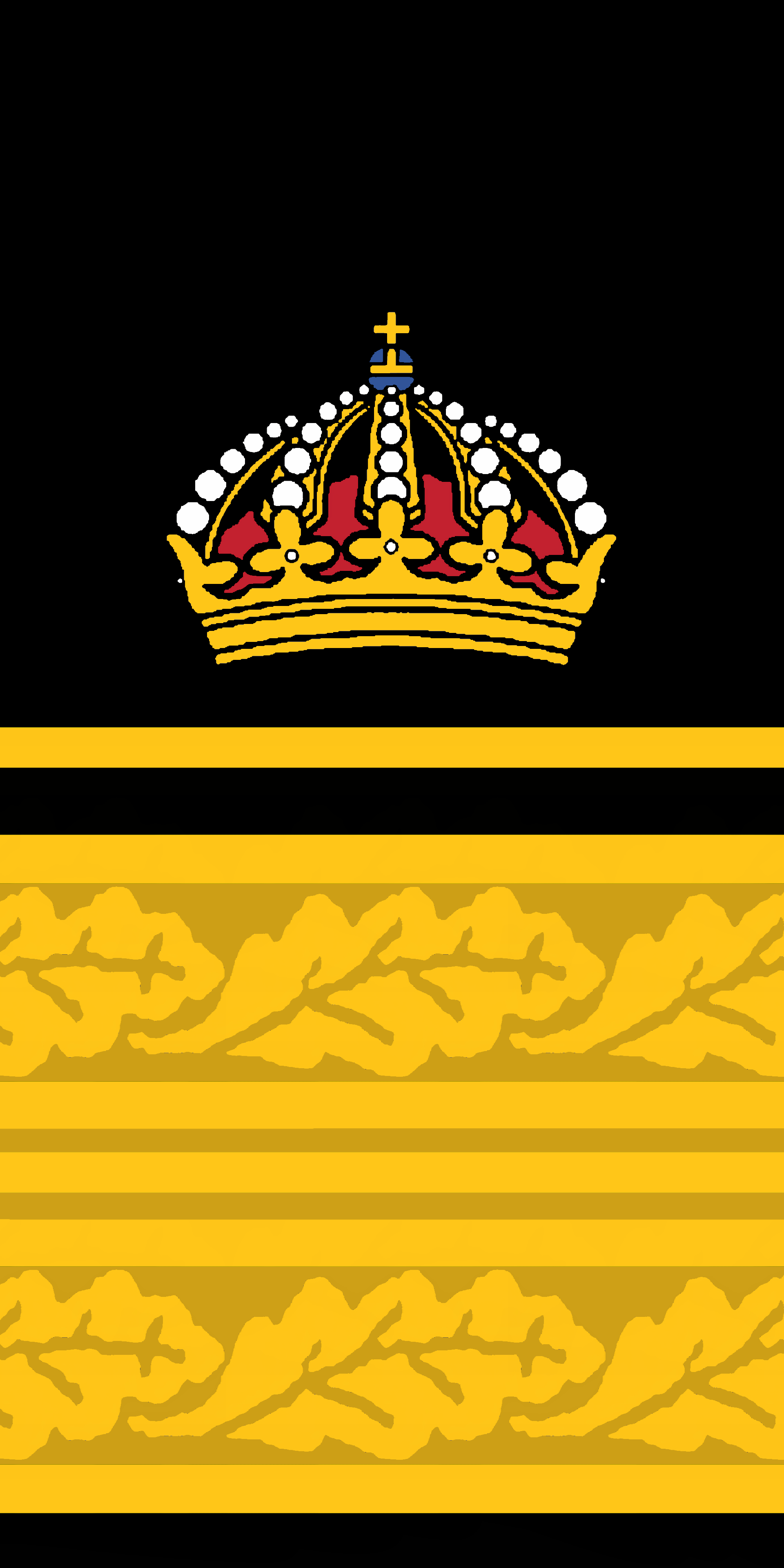
Assistant Police Director (Deputy regional Police Chief, Deputy department Chief, or after special appointment) (Biträdande polisdirektör)

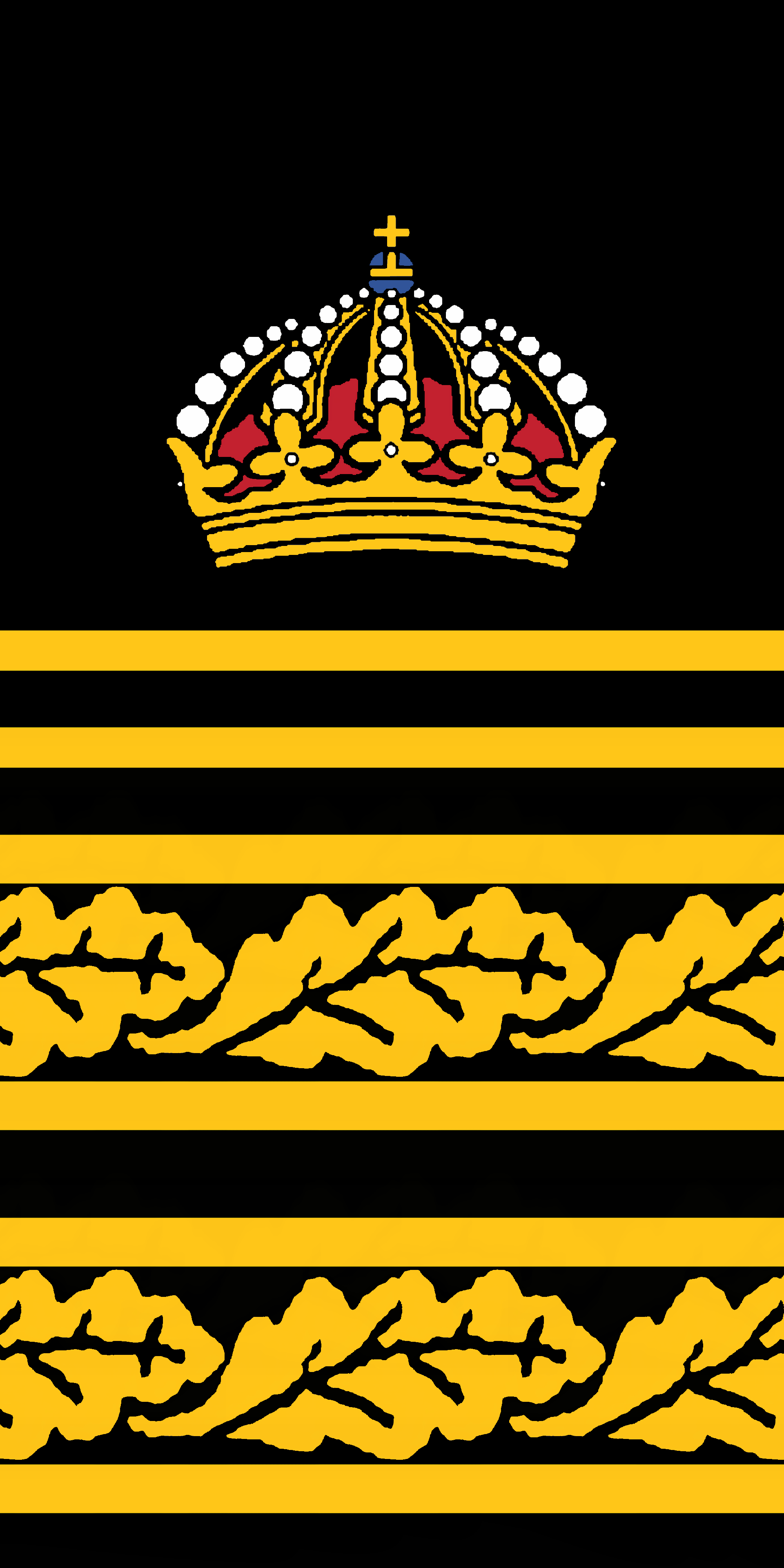
Police Master (Chief of police area, or after special appointment) (Polismästare)

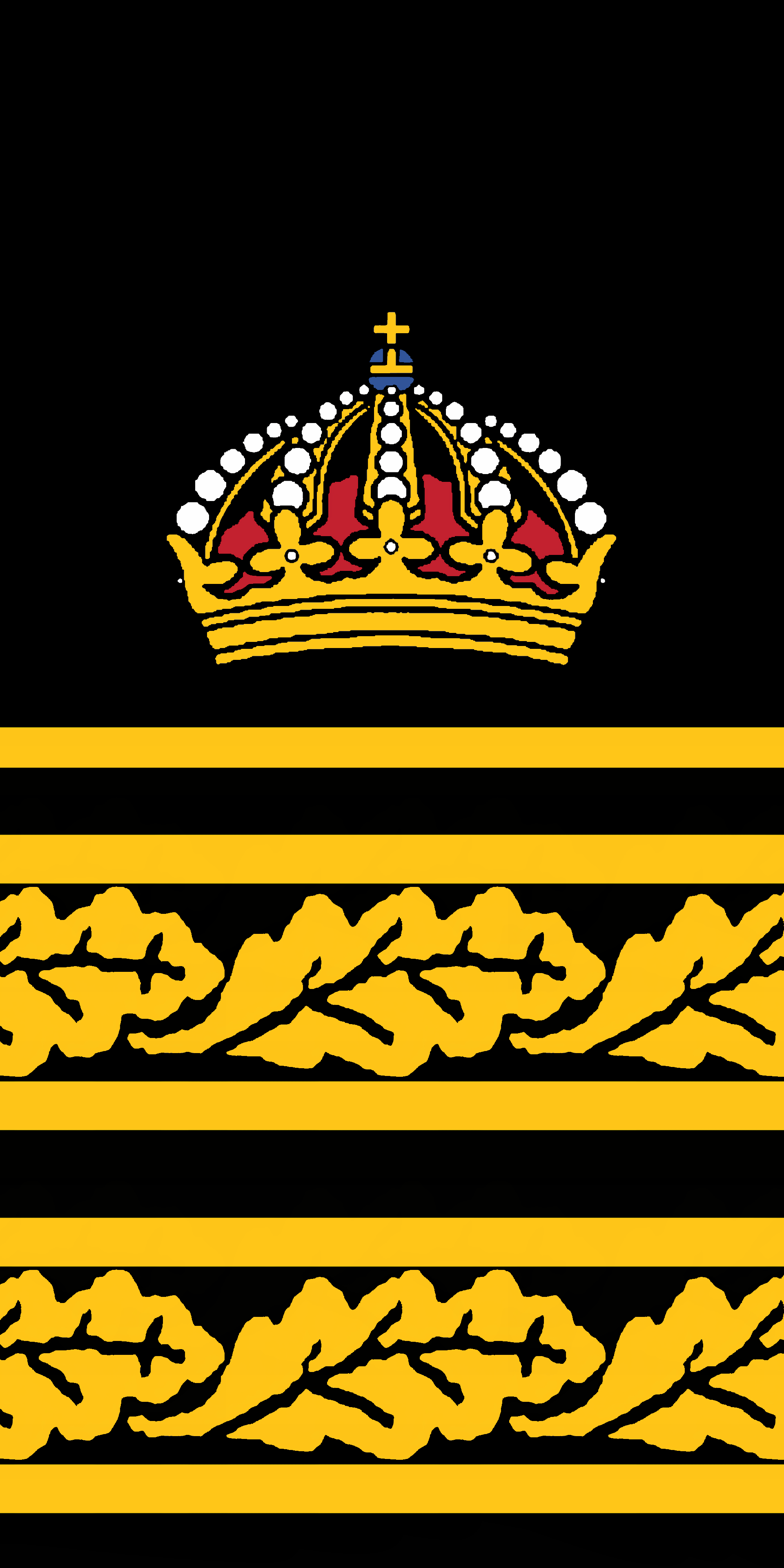
Police Master (Deputy chief of police area, or after special appointment) (Polismästare)

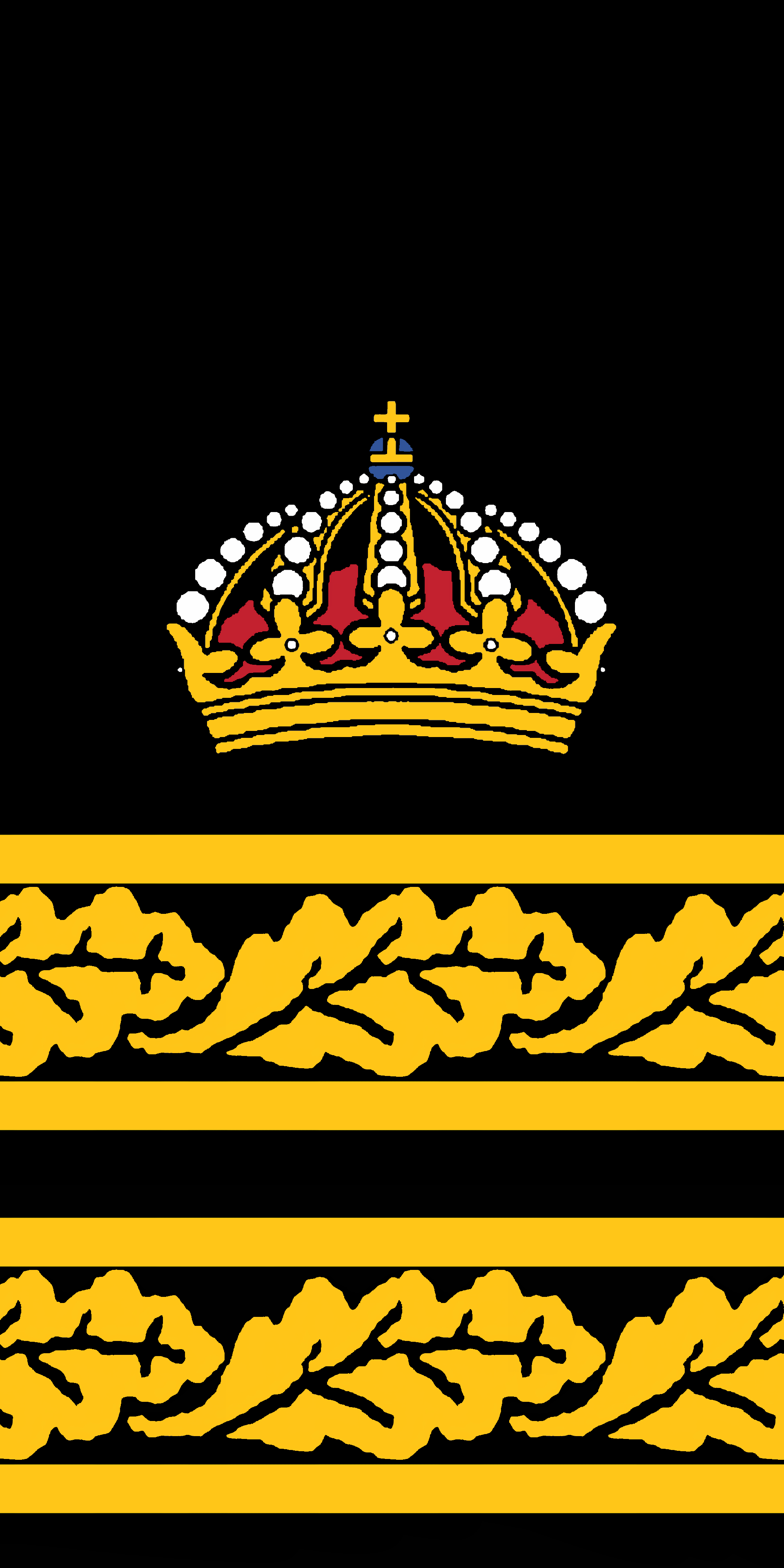
Police Master, Police Senior Intendant (Chief of unit; Deputy chief of police area) (Polismästare / Polisöverintendent)

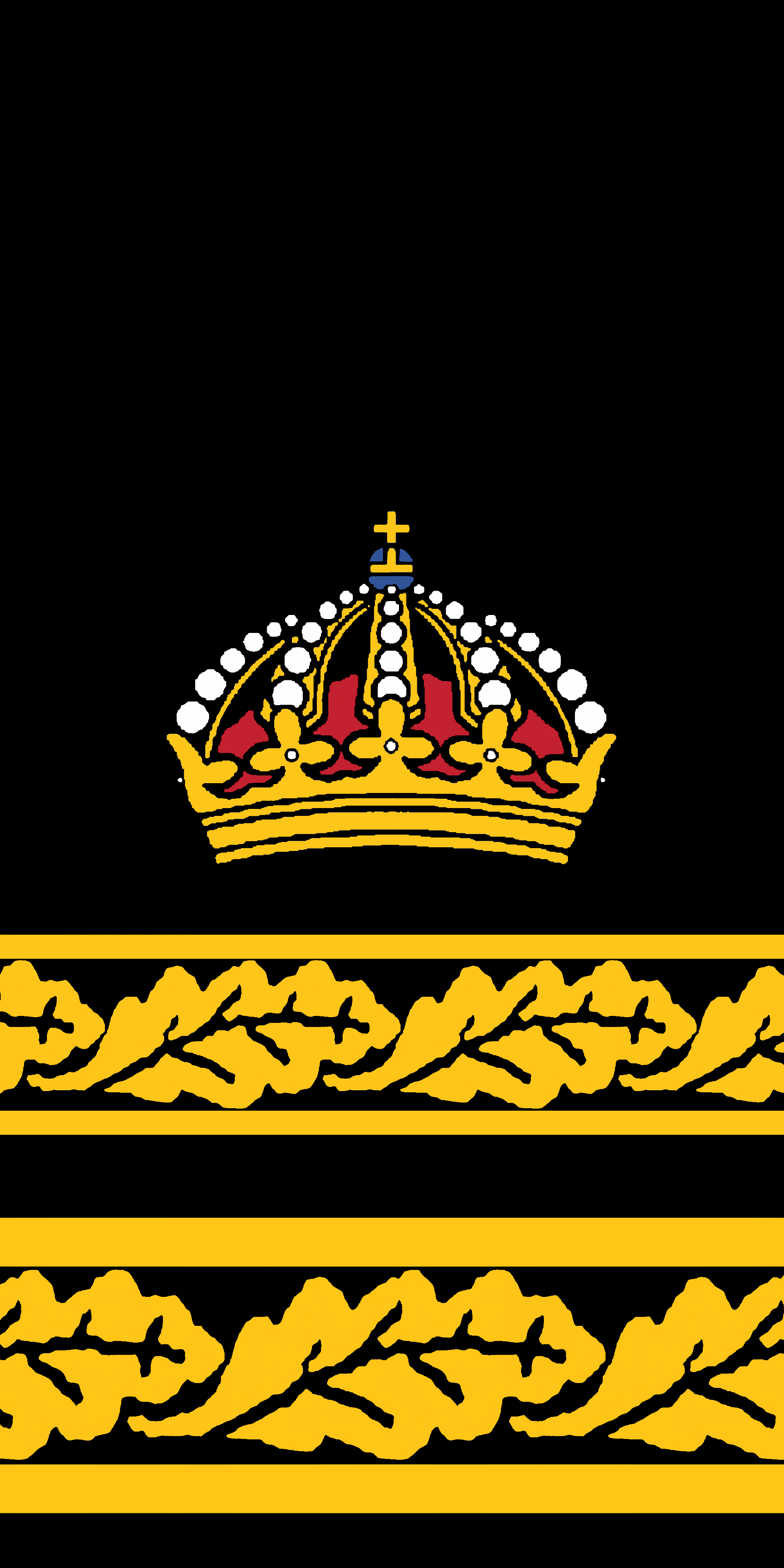
Police Intendant (Chief of a local police area; chief of staff of a police area) (Polisintendent)

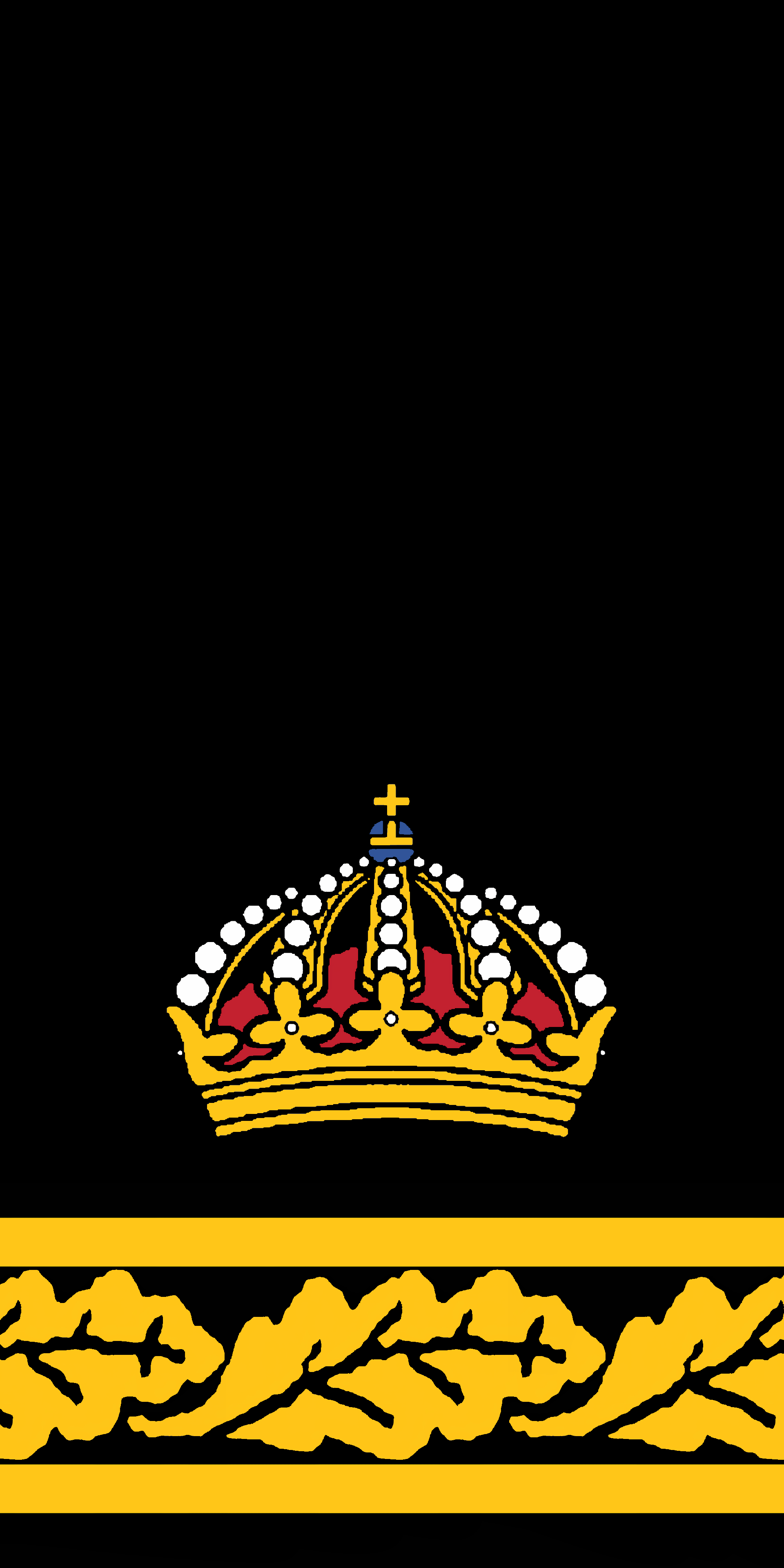
Police Secretary (Section chief of national departments) (Polissekreterare)

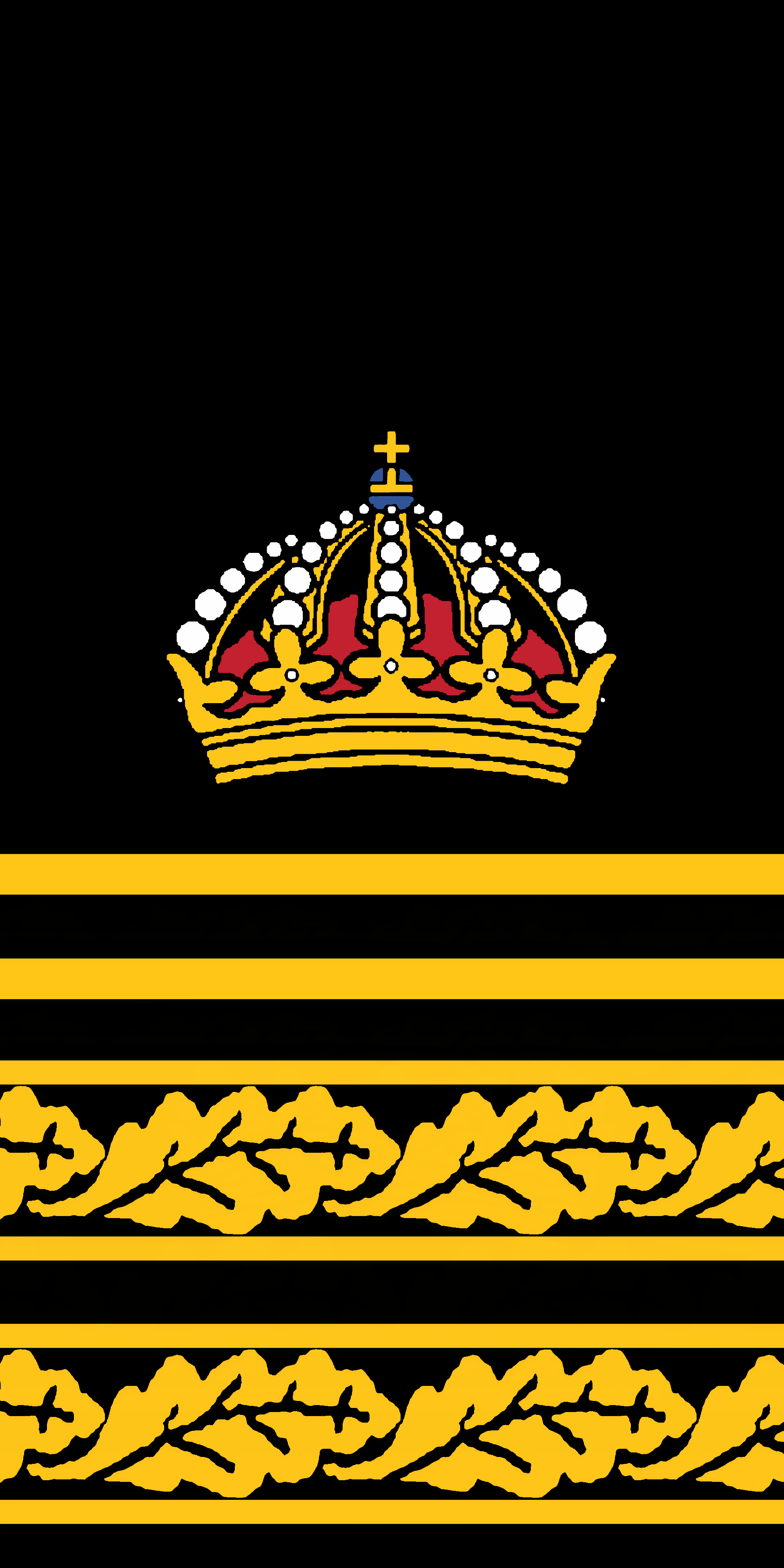
Police Commissar, Detective Commissar (Chief of section) (Poliskommissarie / Kriminalkommissarie, chef för sektion)

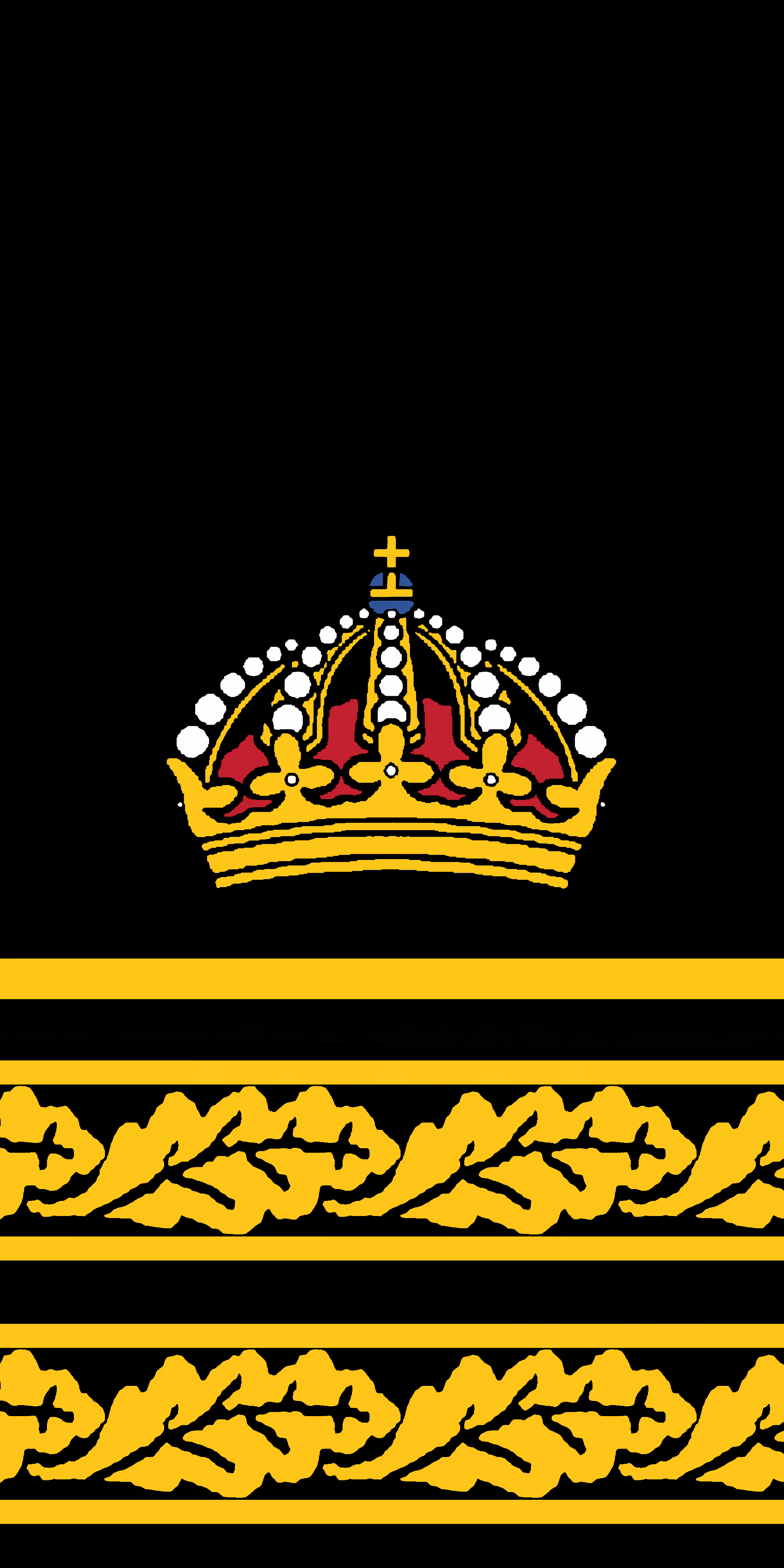
Police Commissar, Detective Commissar (Regional Supervisor; deputy chief of section/local police area) (Poliskommissarie / Kriminalkommissarie, vakthavande befäl; biträdande chef för lokalpolisområde; chef för befälsgrupp på indirekt nivå)

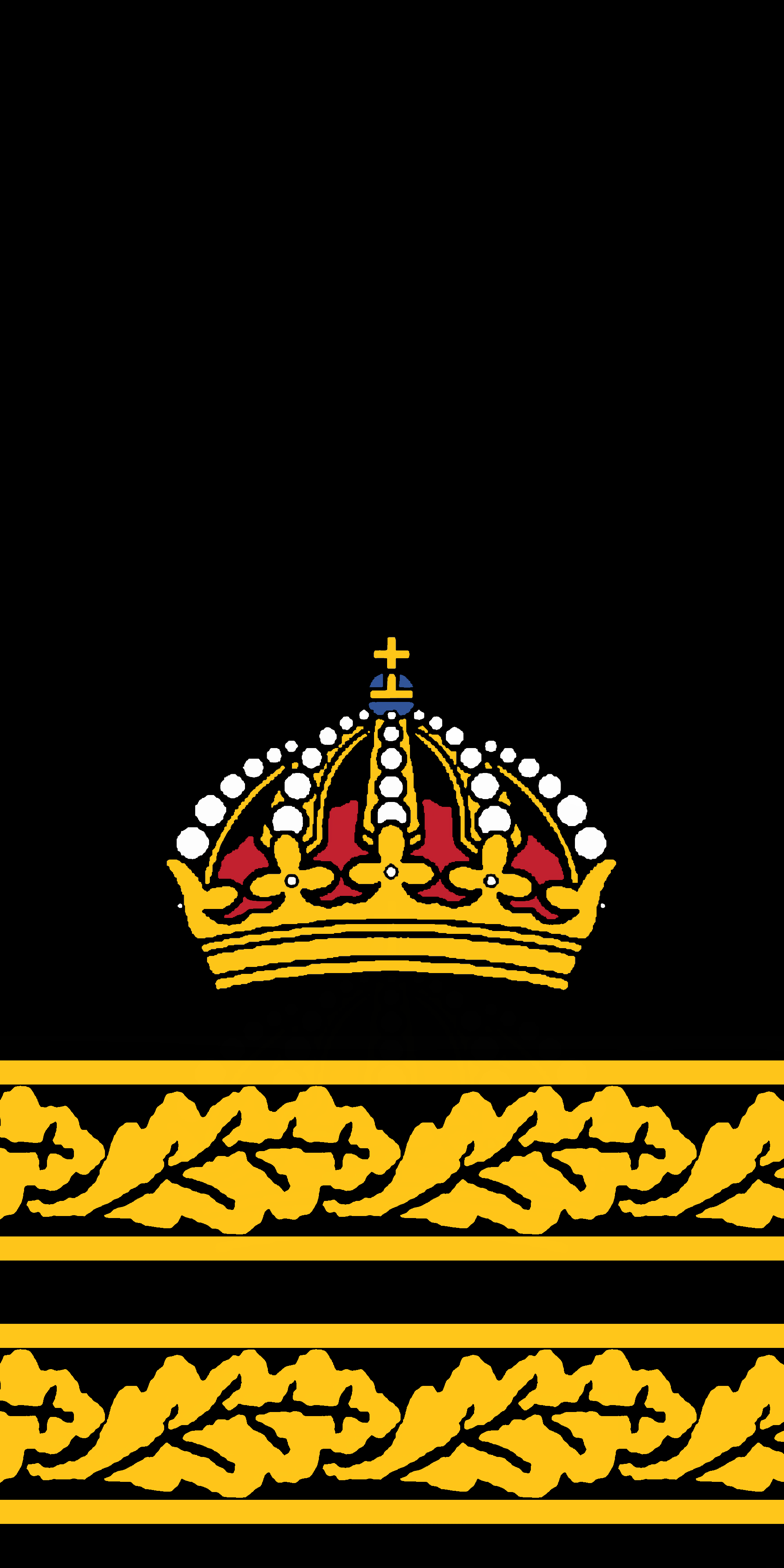
Police Commissar, Detective Commissar (Poliskommissarie / Kriminalkommissarie)

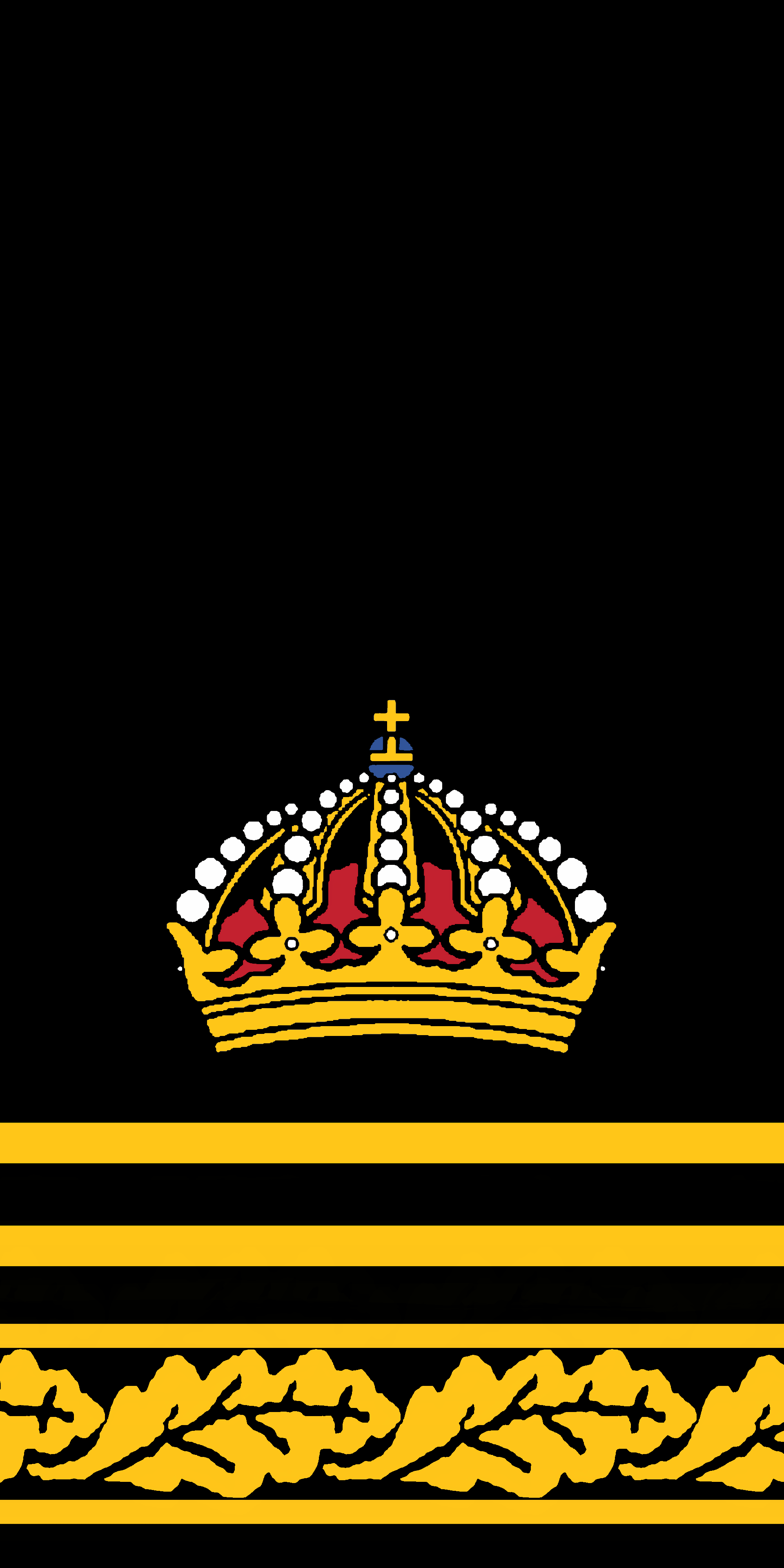
Police Inspector, Detective Inspector (Sergeant, chief of group) (Polisinspektör / Kriminalinspektör, chef för grupp)

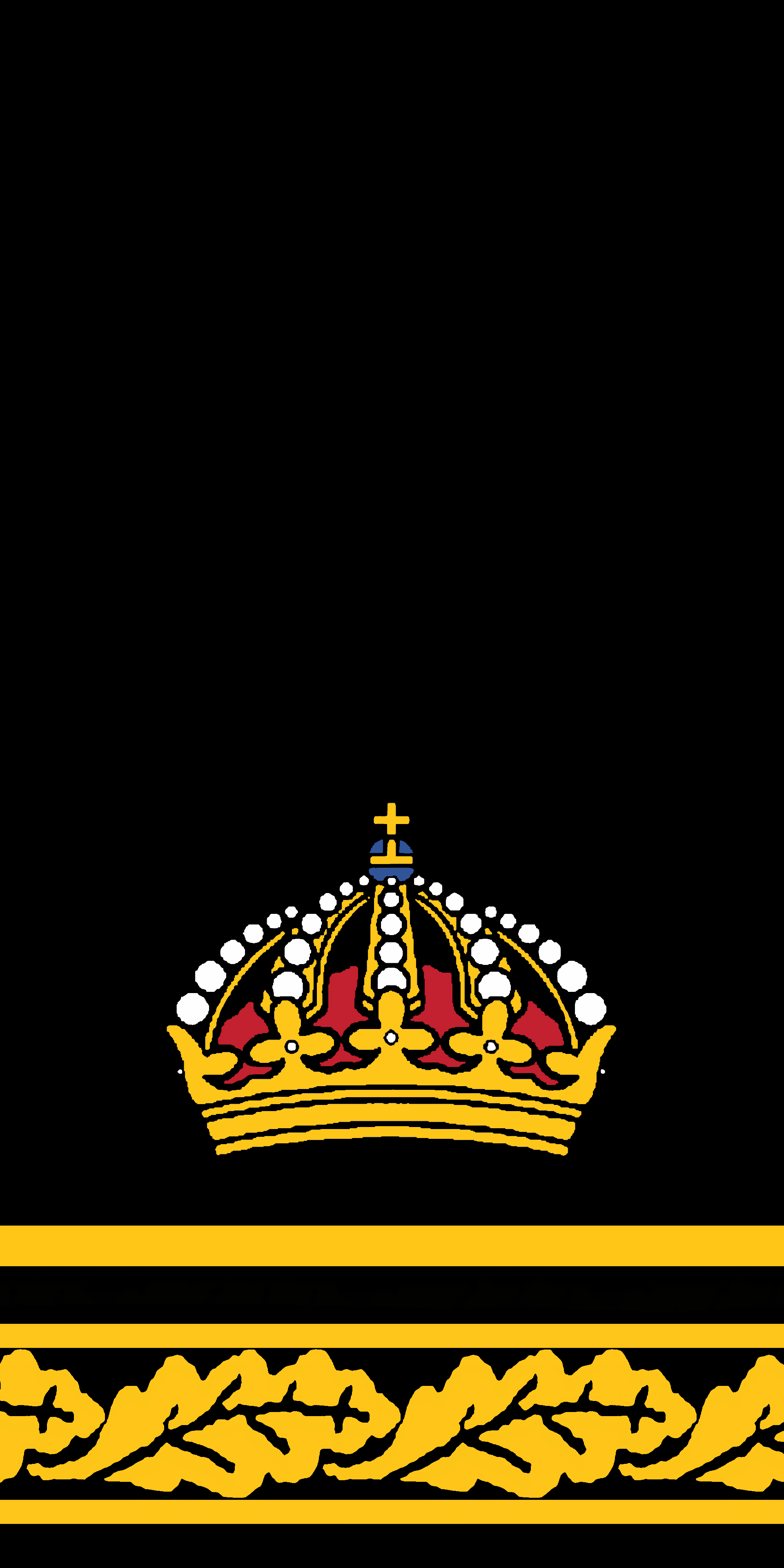
Police Inspector, Detective Inspector (Sergeant, supervisor) (Polisinspektör / Kriminalinspektör, befäl / arbetsledare)

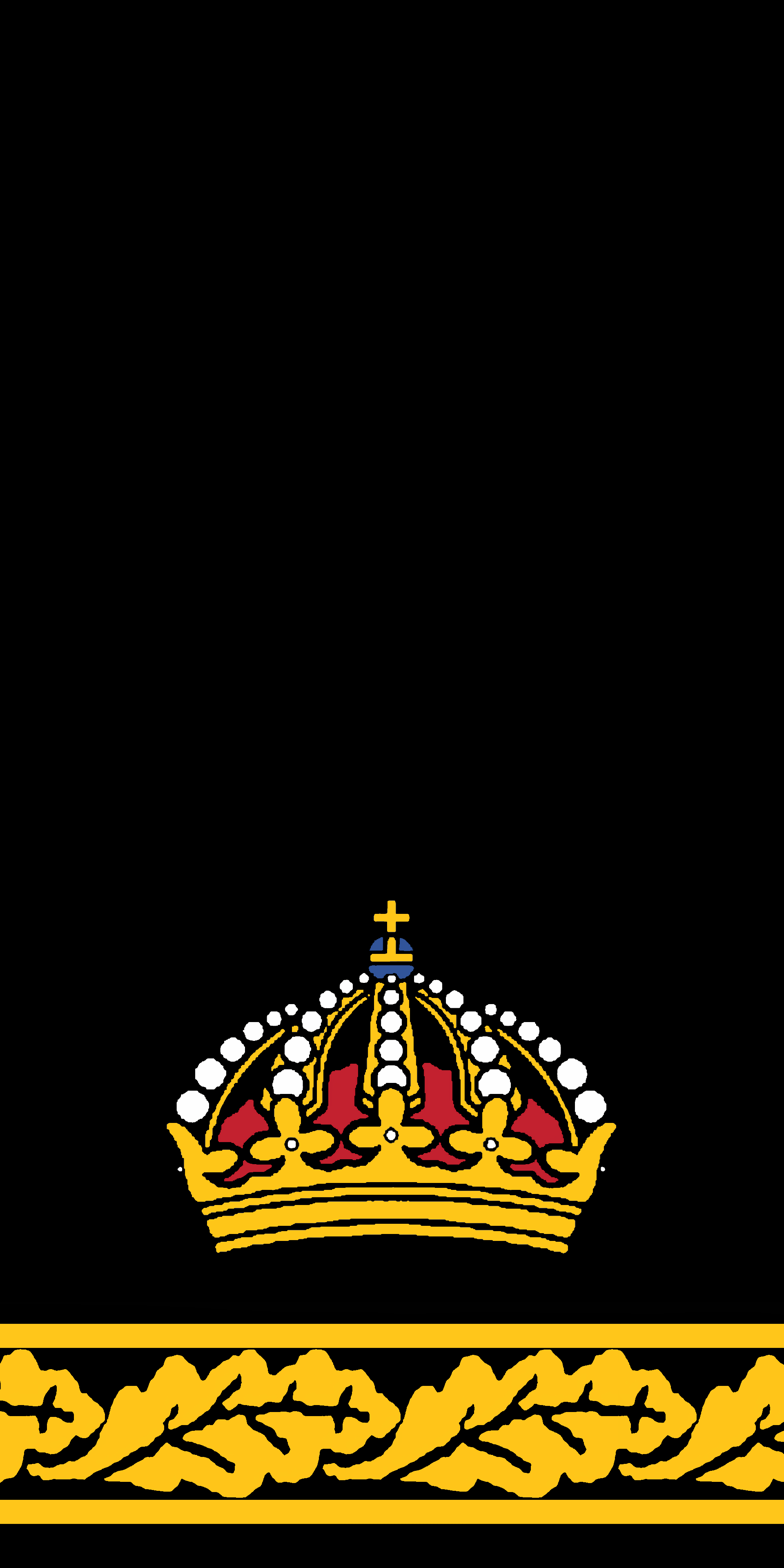
Police Inspector, Detective Inspector (Sergeant) (Polisinspektör / Kriminalinspektör)

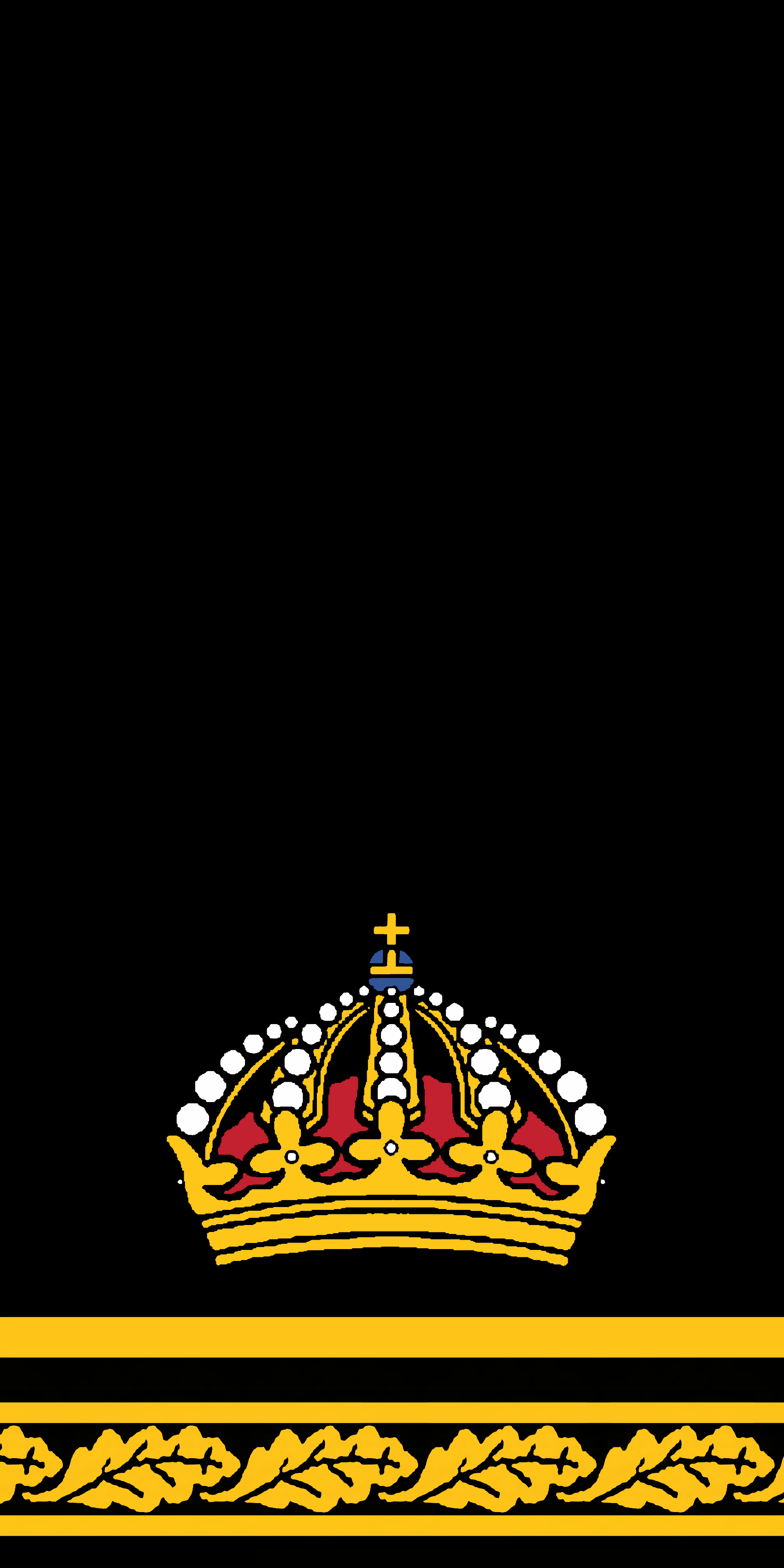
Police Constable (Level 5) (Polisassistent, nivå 5)

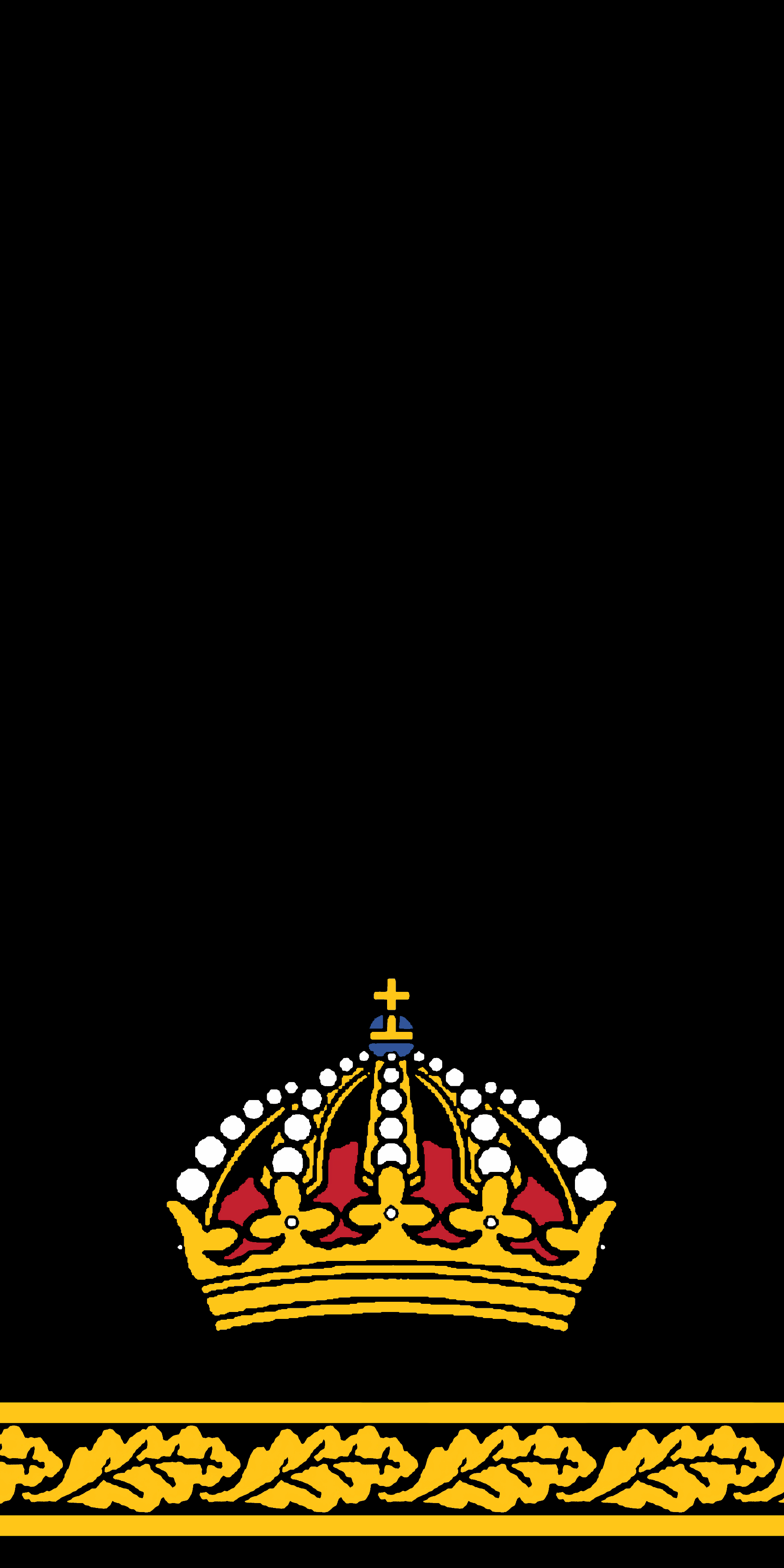
Police Constable (Level 4) (Polisassistent, nivå 4)

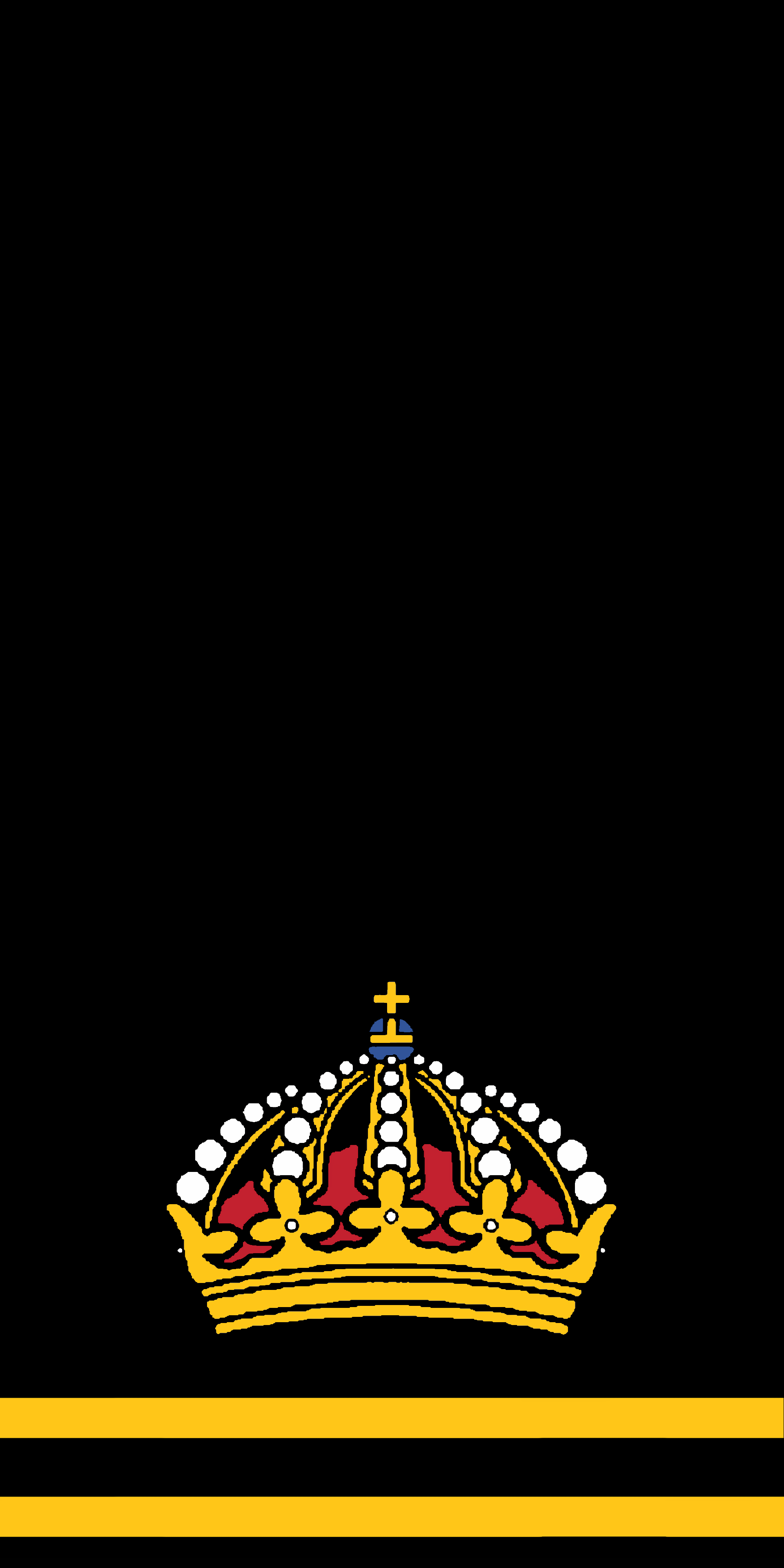
Police Constable (Level 3) (Polisassistent, nivå 3)

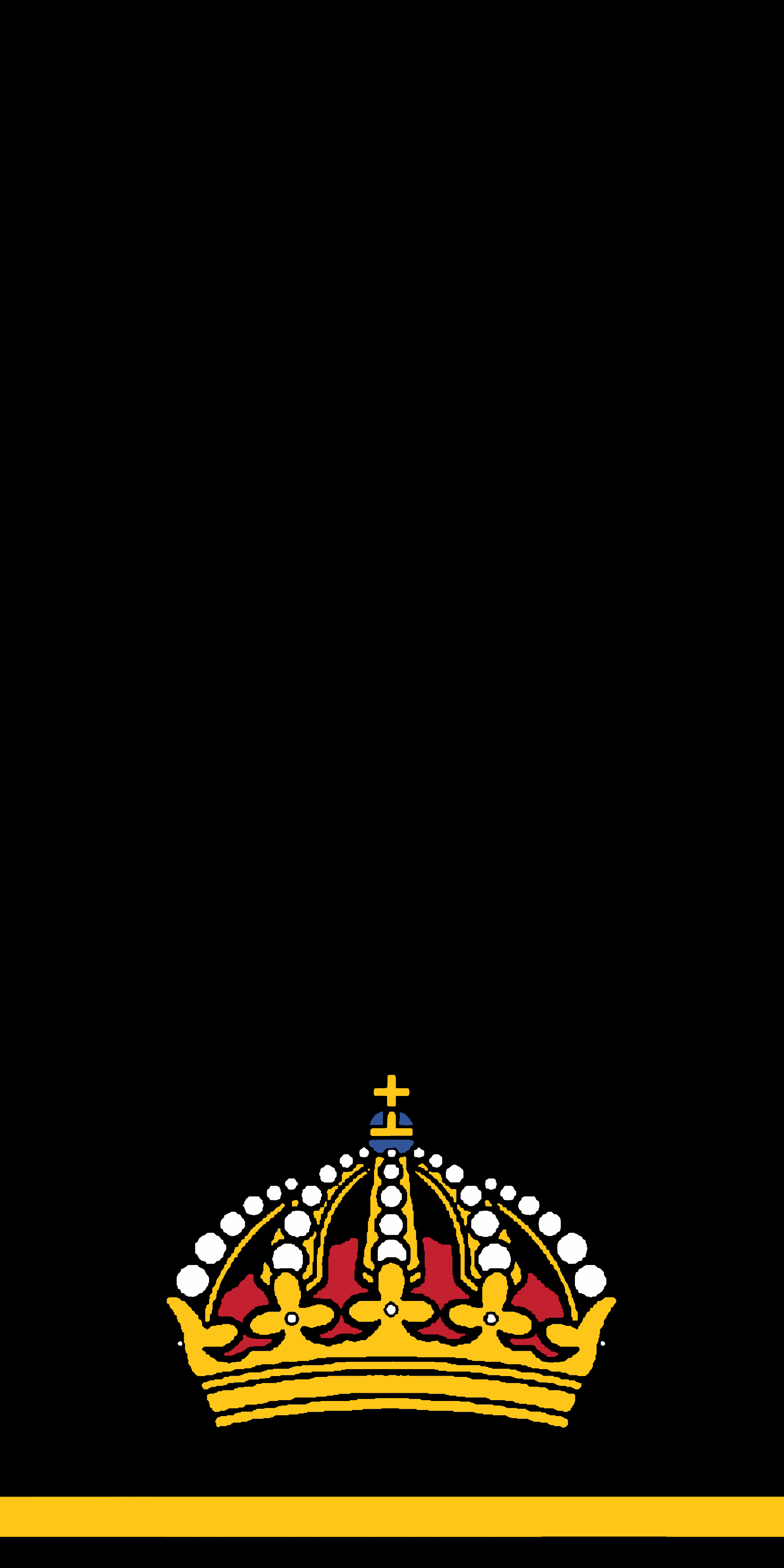
Police Constable (Level 2, or >4 years of service) (Polisassistent, nivå 2 eller >4 års anställning)

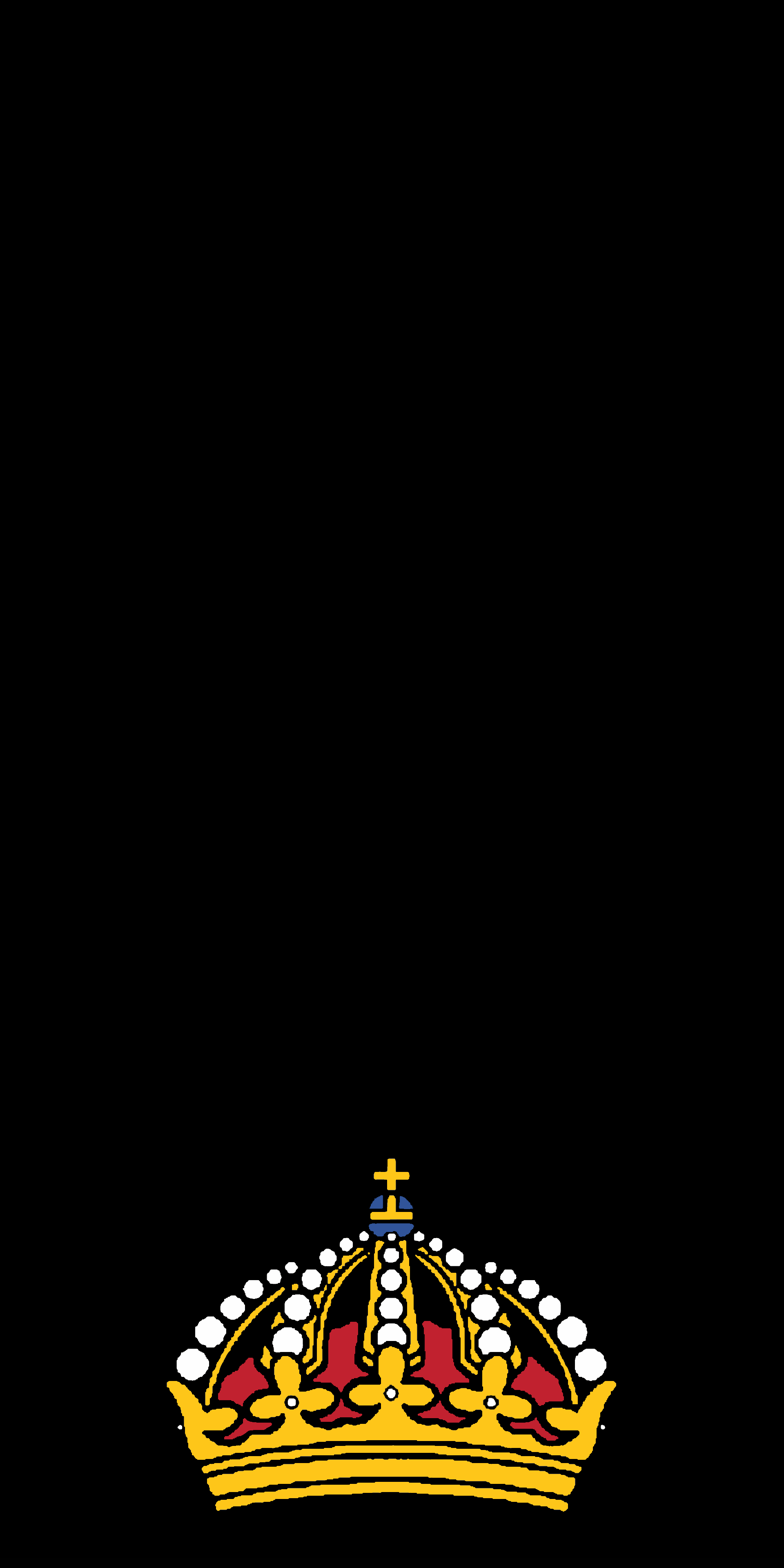
Police Constable (Level 1, or <4 years of service) (Polisassistent, nivå 1 eller <4 års anställning)

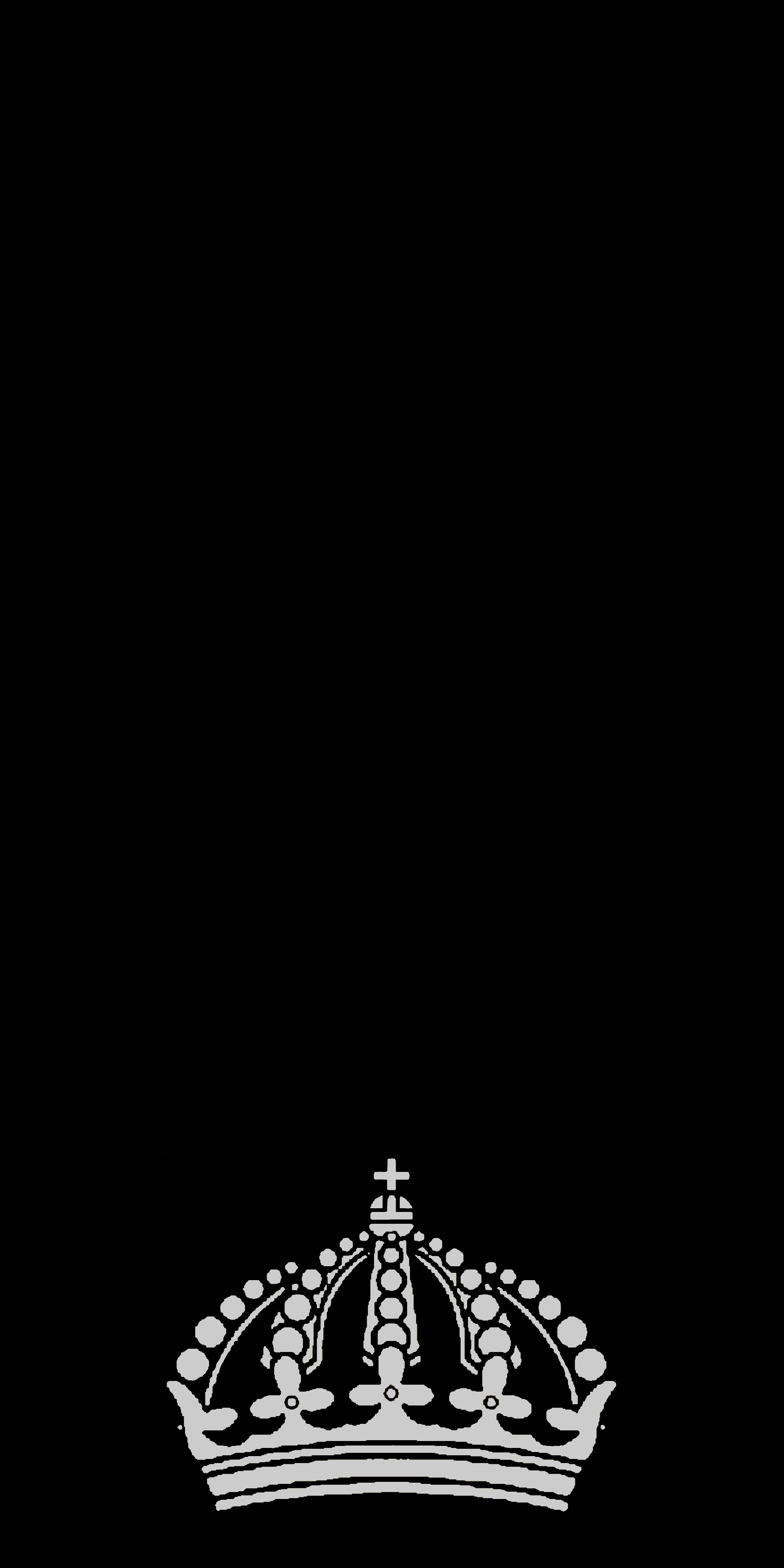
Trainee Police Constable (Officer in field training) (Polisaspirant)

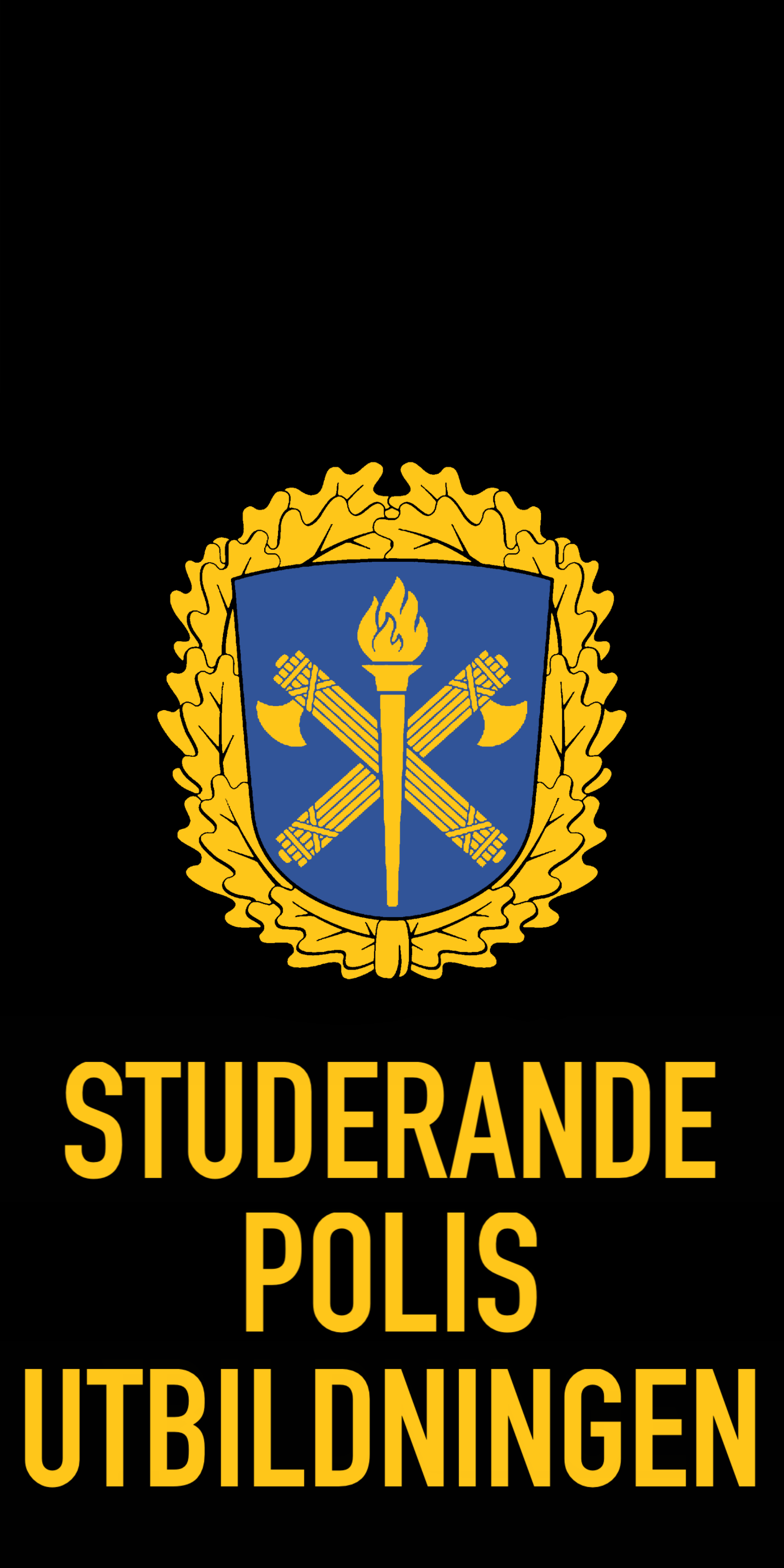
Police Academy Recruit (Studerande Polisutbildningen)

2015–2022

The following ranks were used after the national restructuring of the Swedish police in 2015, up until the introduction of KUV in 2022:

Swedish police ranks and insignia (2015–2022)
Rank	Rikspolischef; Säkerhetspolischef	Biträdande säkerhetspolischef	Polisdirektör (Chef för polisregion/avdelning eller efter särskilt beslut av rikspolischefen)	Biträdande polisdirektör (Biträdande för polisregion/avdelning eller efter särskilt beslut av rikspolischefen)	Polismästare (Chef för polisområde eller efter särskilt beslut)	Polismästare/Polisöverintendent (Chef för enhet, biträdande chef för polisområde)	Polisintendent (chef för lokalpolisområde, kanslichef vid polisområde)	Polissekreterare (Note: Appointment as polisintendent or polissekreterare requires an academic degree or graduation from the police academy; graduation from the police senior leadership course, and at least three years experience of indirect leadership. (Rikspolisstyrelsens författningssamling 2011:20.))
Translation	National Police Chief; Chief of the Security Police	Deputy Chief of the Security Police	Police Director (Regional Police Chief, Department Chief, or after special appointment)	Assistant Police Director (Deputy regional Police Chief, Deputy department Chief, or after special appointment)	Police Master (Chief of police area, or after special appointment)	Police Master; Police Senior Intendant (Chief of unit, Deputy chief of police area)	Police Intendant (Chief of a local police area, chief of staff of a police area)	Police Secretary
Commonwealth equivalent	Inspector-General	Deputy Inspector-General	Commissioner	Deputy Commissioner	Assistant Commissioner	Chief Superintendent	Senior Superintendent	Superintendent
Insignia
Rank	Poliskommisarie; Kriminalkommissarie, (Chef för sektion)	Poliskommisarie; Kriminalkommissarie (Befäl/arbetsledare, biträdande chef för section/lokalpolisområde, chef för befälsgrupp på indirect nivå)	Poliskommisarie; Kriminalkommissarie	Polisinspektör; Kriminalinspektör (Chef för grupp)	Polisinspektör; Kriminalinspektör (Befäl/arbetsledare	Polisinspektör; Kriminalinspektör	Polisassistent (4 års anställning)	Polisassistent	Polisaspirant
Translation	Police Commissar; Detective Commissar (Chief of section)	Police Commissar; Detective Commissar (Supervisor, deputy chief of section/local police area)	Police Commissar; Detective Commissar	Police Inspector; Detective Inspector (Chief of group)	Police Inspector; Detective Inspector (Supervisor)	Police Inspector; Detective Inspector	Police Assistant (4 years' service)	Police Assistant	Police Aspirant
Commonwealth equivalent	Deputy Superintendent	Assistant Superintendent	Chief Inspector	Inspector	Sergeant Major	Sergeant	Senior Constable	Constable	Student Constable
Insignia

== See also ==
- Enforcement Authority
- Swedish Prison and Probation Service
- Swedish Prosecution Authority
- Police academies by country#Sweden

Swedish police in fiction:

- The Bridge – a Scandinavian crime drama about a Danish and Swedish police duo
- Johan Falk – a fictional Swedish police officer, based on the reported actions of the Special Operations Unit
- Kurt Wallander – a fictional Swedish police detective, created by crime writer Henning Mankell
- Martin Beck – a fictional Swedish police detective, created by crime writers Sjöwall and Wahlöö
- E-HURB - a fictional branch of the Swedish Police Authority in a near future alternate history Sweden, whose role is to police the production and use of advanced androids known as Hubots.
- Thin Blue Line - a TV drama about the difficult life of six police officers in Malmö, Sweden, written by Cilla Jackert
