= Øystein Storrvik =

Norwegian lawyer (born 1958)

- Born: April 7, 1958 (age 68); Oslo, Norway
- Occupation: Jurist

Øystein Ola Storrvik (born 7 April 1958) is a Norwegian lawyer. He attended Oslo Cathedral School and later got a law degree. In 1995 he established his own law firm, Advokatfirmaet Storrvik. He is a permanent defense counsel in Oslo District Court and Borgarting Court of Appeal. In February 2015 it became known that Storrvik was the criminal defense lawyer for terrorist Anders Behring Breivik. Storrvik is also known for being the criminal defense lawyer for David Alexander Toska, one of the people behind the NOKAS robbery.
