= Nokas (film) =

- Norwegian theatrical poster
- Directed by: Erik Skjoldbjærg
- Written by: Christopher Grøndahl
- Produced by: Jan Aksel Angeltvedt
- Starring: Tov Sletta, Frode Winter, Marit Synnøve Berg
- Cinematography: Jakob Ihre
- Edited by: Frida Eggum Michaelsen
- Music by: Geir Jenssen
- Release date: 1 October 2010
- Running time: 90 minutes
- Country: Norway
- Language: Norwegian
- Budget: NOK 23 997 858

Nokas is a 2010 Norwegian heist film directed by Erik Skjoldbjærg. The film portrays the real life NOKAS robbery that took place in Stavanger, Norway in 2004.

In 2011, the film was screened at the Norwegian International Film Festival, where Skjoldbjærg won the award for best director and screenwriter Christopher Grøndahl won the award for best original screenplay.

== Cast ==
- Tov Sletta as David Toska
- Frode Winther Gunnes as Kjell Alrich Schumann
- Morten Håland as Erik Håland
- Geir Høyseth as Erling Havnå
- Morten Larsen as Arne Sigve Klungland
- Marit Synnøve Berg as Beate
- Jeton Jajovski as Jusuf Hani
- André Eriksen as Thomas Thendrup
- Lirik Sahiti as Ikmet Kodzadziku
- Thomas Berhane as Metkel Betew
- Lars Morten Skaiaa as Johnny Thendrup
