= IG EULEX =

European multinational police tactical unit

- IG EULEX patch
- Active: 2008 - present ST6 1999 - 2008
- Country: Multinational
- Agency: EULEX
- Type: Police tactical unit
- Operations jurisdiction: Kosovo
- Headquarters: Mitrovica

Structure
- Operators (seconded from police forces): 29 officers

IG EULEX (Intervention Group) is a European multinational police tactical unit of the European Union Rule of Law Mission in Kosovo (EULEX) that is based in Mitrovica. The unit was originally formed as Special Team 6.

== History ==
Special Team 6 (ST6) was formed after the Kosovo conflict in 1999 by the United Nations Interim Administration Mission in Kosovo (UNMIK). The size of ST6 was 21 operators seconded mostly from various European police tactical units. The unit formed a part of the United Nations Police and every member country of the United Nations could contribute to the unit. They acted as police officers and handled dangerous situations caused by Albanian and Serb ethnic violence in Kosovo. Special Team 6 handled high-risk arrests, security of diplomats, and hostage rescue.

In December 2008, ST6 was renamed the IG EULEX (Intervention Group) when it transferred to the EULEX from the UNMIK.

== Members ==
ST6 personnel had to be experienced police tactical unit operators. Units that had personnel in ST6 include:

- Austria: EKO Cobra
- Canada: Emergency Task Force (TPS)
- Croatia: ATJ Lučko
- Czech Republic: URN, Zásahová jednotka KŘP Jihočeského kraje and Zásahová jednotka KŘP Plzeňského kraje
- France: GIGN
- Germany: GSG 9 and SEK
- Iceland: Víkingasveitin
- Norway: Delta
- Slovenia: SEP
- Sweden: Piketen (Malmö)
- Ukraine: WSzR Sokił UBOZ

Units or countries that have or have had personnel in EULEX IG include:

- Austria: EKO Cobra
- Belgium: CGSU
- Czech Republic
- France: GIGN and RAID
- Germany: GSG 9 and SEK
- Italy: GIS and NOCS
- Lithuania: VST (ORKA unit)
- Netherlands: DSI and UIM
- Poland: SPAP
- Romania: DIAS
- Slovakia
- Slovenia: SEP
- Sweden: NI and Piketen (Malmö)
