= Law enforcement in Sweden =

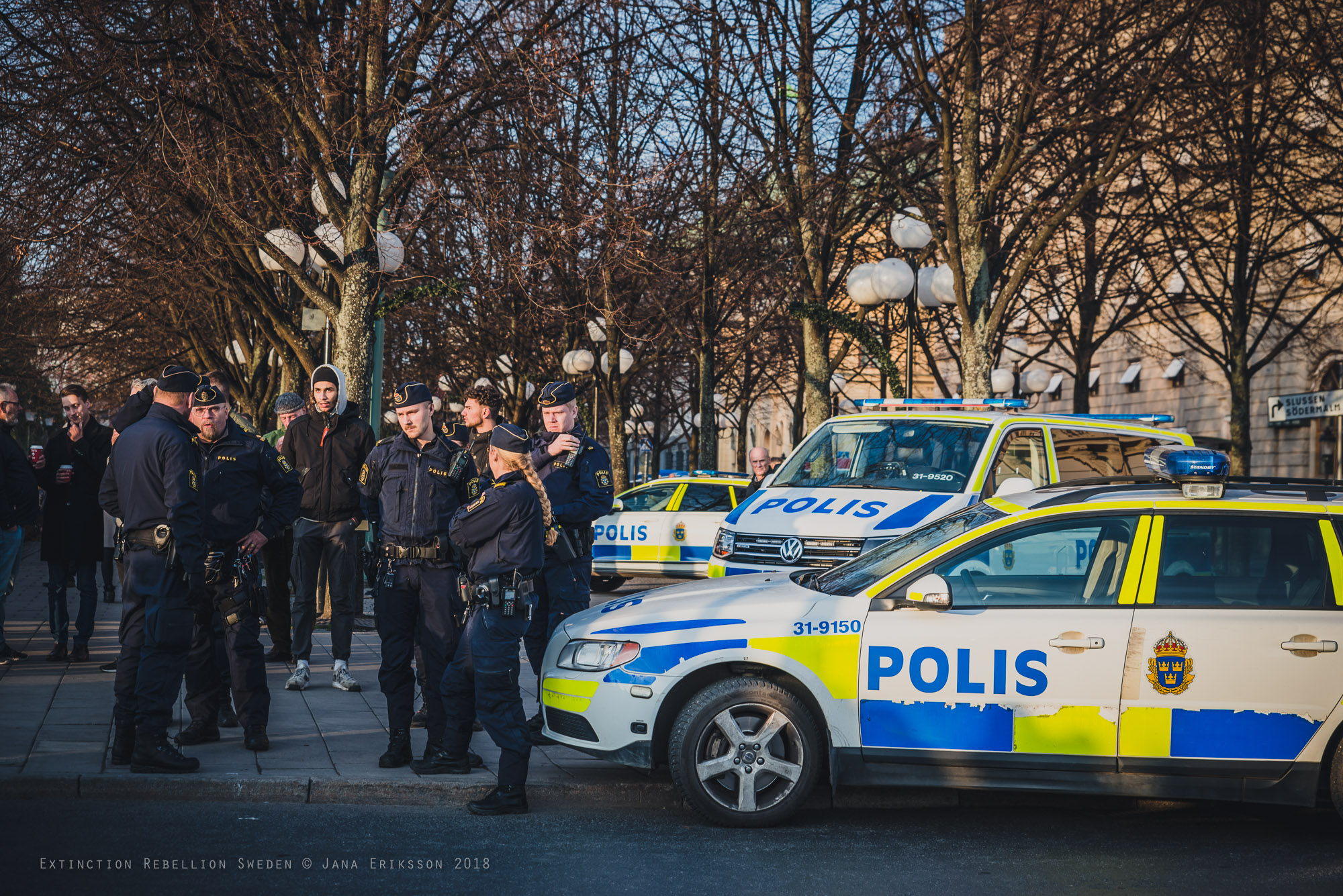
Swedish police officers near their service cars.

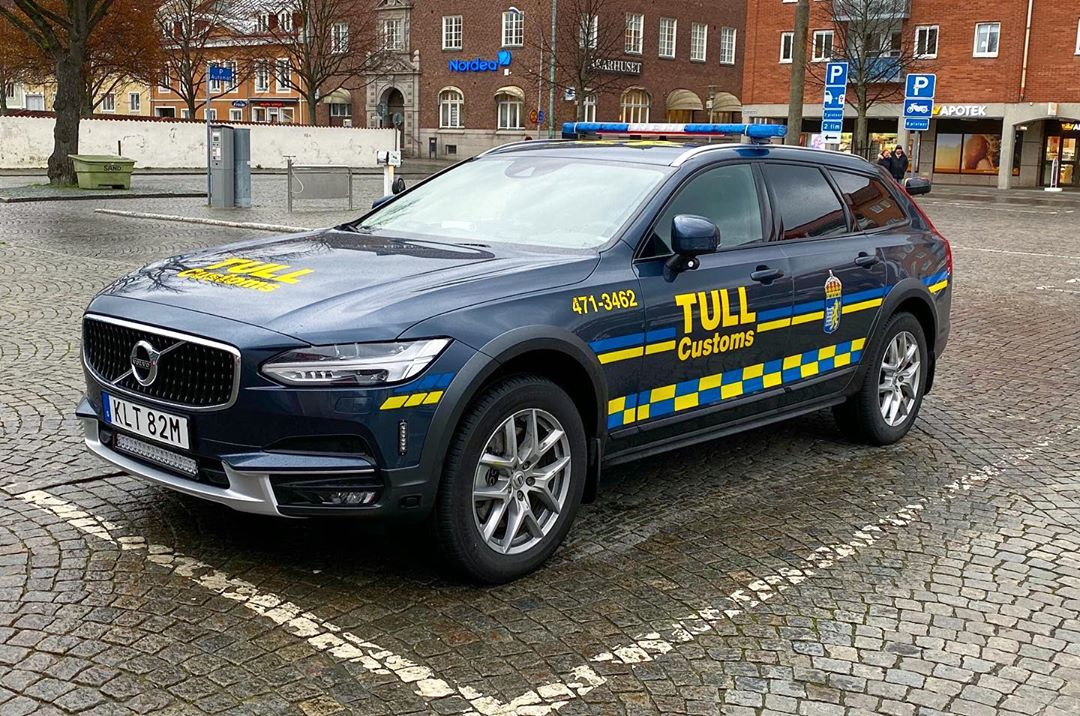
A car of the Swedish Customs Service.

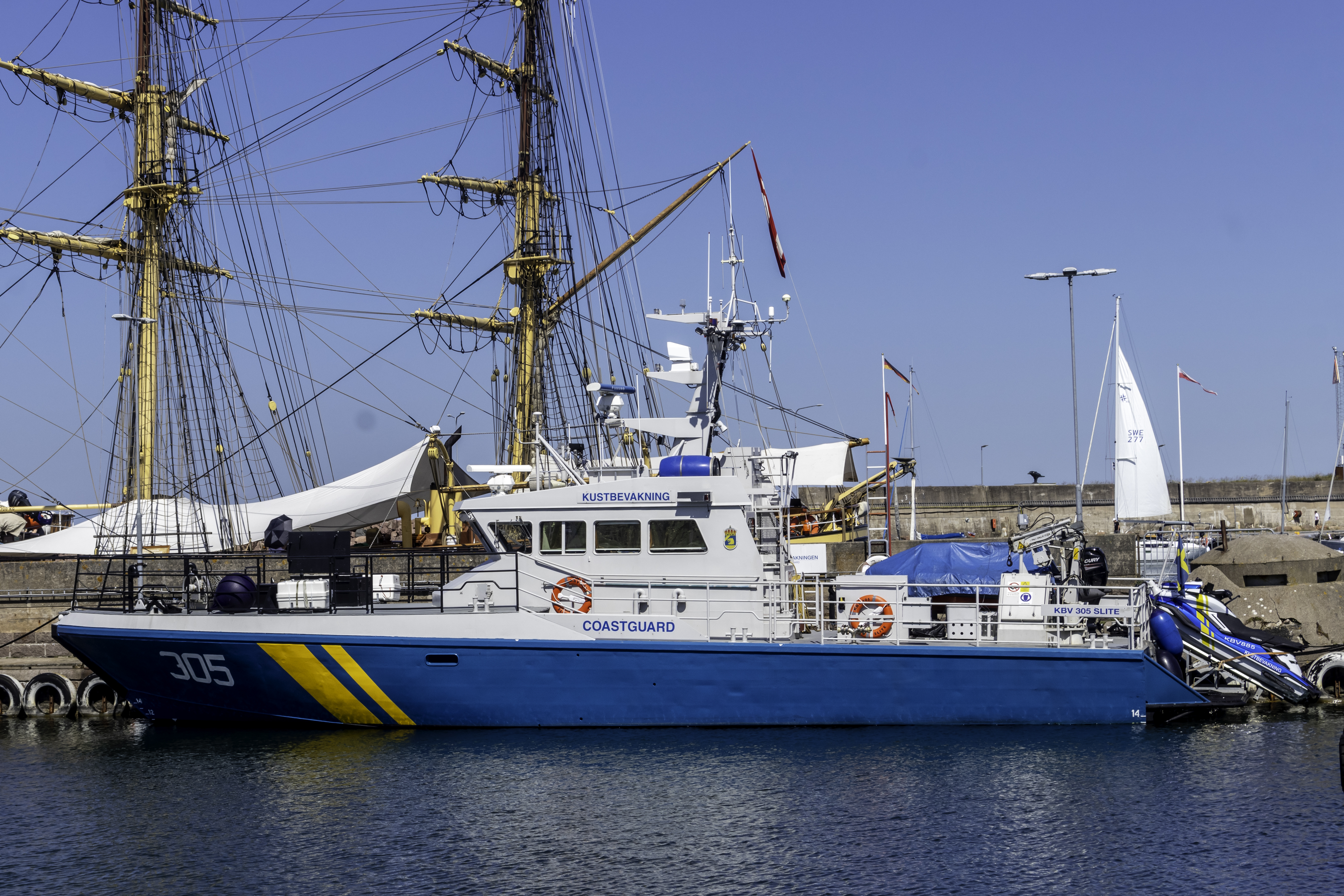
Swedish Coast Guard patrol vessel.

Law enforcement in Sweden is carried out by several government agencies, under the guidance of the Government of Sweden.

== Structure ==
The administration of both law enforcement and the judiciary of Sweden falls under the Ministry of Justice, a cabinet-level department in the government of Sweden, headed by the Minister of Justice. The Ministry is primarily concerned with policy-making and legislation. The actual day-to-day administration is the responsibility of agencies, such as the Swedish Police Authority (Swedish: Polismyndigheten).

The organization mainly tasked with law enforcement is the Swedish Police Authority. In addition, under certain circumstances, other government agencies can be tasked with law enforcement, including investigations, arrest/probationary powers, or enforcement of judgements. Just like in the United States, Swedish law has provisions similar to the U.S. Posse Comitatus Act which limits the use of the military to perform the tasks of law enforcement agencies in time of peace.

This rule has recently come under review, in light of the upsurge of terrorist activity following the 9/11 attacks and the bombings in Bali, Madrid and London it has been suggested that the military should be allowed to aid the police in certain situations of heightened tension.

== Agencies under the Ministry of Justice ==
=== Swedish Police Authority ===
The Swedish Police Authority is the central administrative authority for the police in Sweden and the National Forensics Centre. It is responsible for law enforcement, general social order and public safety within the country. A number of special units are organized under this agency, such as the National Task Force and the Reinforced Regional Task Forces.

=== Swedish Security Service ===
The Swedish Security Service (Swedish: Säkerhetspolisen, Säpo) is tasked with protection of the constitution, close protection, counter-espionage and counter-terrorism.

=== Swedish Economic Crime Authority ===
The Swedish Economic Crime Authority (Swedish: Ekobrottsmyndigheten, EBM) is a multidisciplinary law enforcement agency with the responsibility to both investigate and prosecute in cases of economic crimes. Similar multidisciplinary organizations are the Økokrim in Norway and the Scorpions in South Africa.

=== Swedish Prosecution Authority ===
The Swedish Prosecution Authority (Swedish: Åklagarmyndigheten) is the principal agency in Sweden responsible for public prosecutions. It is headed by the Prosecutor General of Sweden.

Swedish prosecutors, belonging or not to the authority, are responsible for leading and supervising criminal investigations done by the Swedish Police, and preparing and presenting cases for the courts. The prosecutors also hold a number of quasi-judicial powers like, though not officially, acting as judges in several misdemeanor cases.

There are also a couple of Swedish prosecution agencies, independent of the SPA such as the Swedish Chancellor of Justice, which is independent of the national government, and the Parliamentary Ombudsman. The Chancellor of Justice is responsible for supervising the lawfulness of government actions. The Parliamentary Ombudsman is responsible for supervising public authorities and also has powers to act as a special prosecutor and bring charges against public officials for malfeasance or some other irregularity. This happens very rarely.

=== Chancellor of Justice ===
The Chancellor, roughly the Attorney General of Sweden, acts, besides supervising lawyers and public officials, as a special prosecutor in several cases. The Chancellor does have, as being a prosecutor, investigative powers in cases regarding misconduct of lawyers and public officials, and violations of the Swedish laws dealing with press freedom.

=== Swedish Prison and Probation Service ===
The Swedish Prison and Probation Service (Swedish: Kriminalvården) does have, besides duties as guarding prisons and keeping arrested suspects in jail, certain powers to track down escaped convicts.

=== Swedish National Board of Forensic Medicine ===
The Swedish National Board of Forensic Medicine (Swedish: Rättsmedicinalverket) is responsible for forensic psychiatry, forensic chemistry, forensic medicine and forensic genetics.

== Agencies under the Ministry of Finance ==
=== Swedish Customs Service ===
The Swedish Customs Service, or Tullverket, performs duties related to law enforcement including border guard duties and the trace of illegal narcotics attempted to be smuggled into the country.

=== Swedish Enforcement Administration ===
The Swedish Enforcement Administration, or Kronofogdemyndigheten is the law enforcement agency in charge of debt collection, distraint, evictions, and the enforcement of court orders in Sweden. The authority also supervises trustees in bankruptcy.

== Agencies under the Ministry of Defence ==
=== Swedish Coast Guard ===
The Swedish Coast Guard, or Kustbevakningen enforce Swedish law on the sea, independently or together with the Swedish Police. This includes sobriety tests of the operators of any marine vessel.

=== Swedish Military Police ===
The Swedish military police is the law enforcement service of the Swedish Armed Forces. The Life Guards is responsible for training military police soldiers, Royal Guards and other guards. The duties of the military police outside the military may include protection and safety of foreign Heads of State.

The connection between the military police units and the Life Guards is similar to the structure in the Swedish Police Service; the Life Guard is responsible for service, coordination and development of the military police, and the local unit is responsible to investigate and keep law and order at the camp.

== Agencies under the Ministry of Health and Social Affairs ==
=== Swedish National Board of Institutional Care ===
The Swedish National Board of Institutional Care (Swedish: Statens institutionsstyrelse) arrange compulsory care for young people with psychosocial problems and for adults suffering from substance abuse problems.

== See also ==
- Crime in Sweden
