= Nokas =

Norwegian security company

Nokas AS
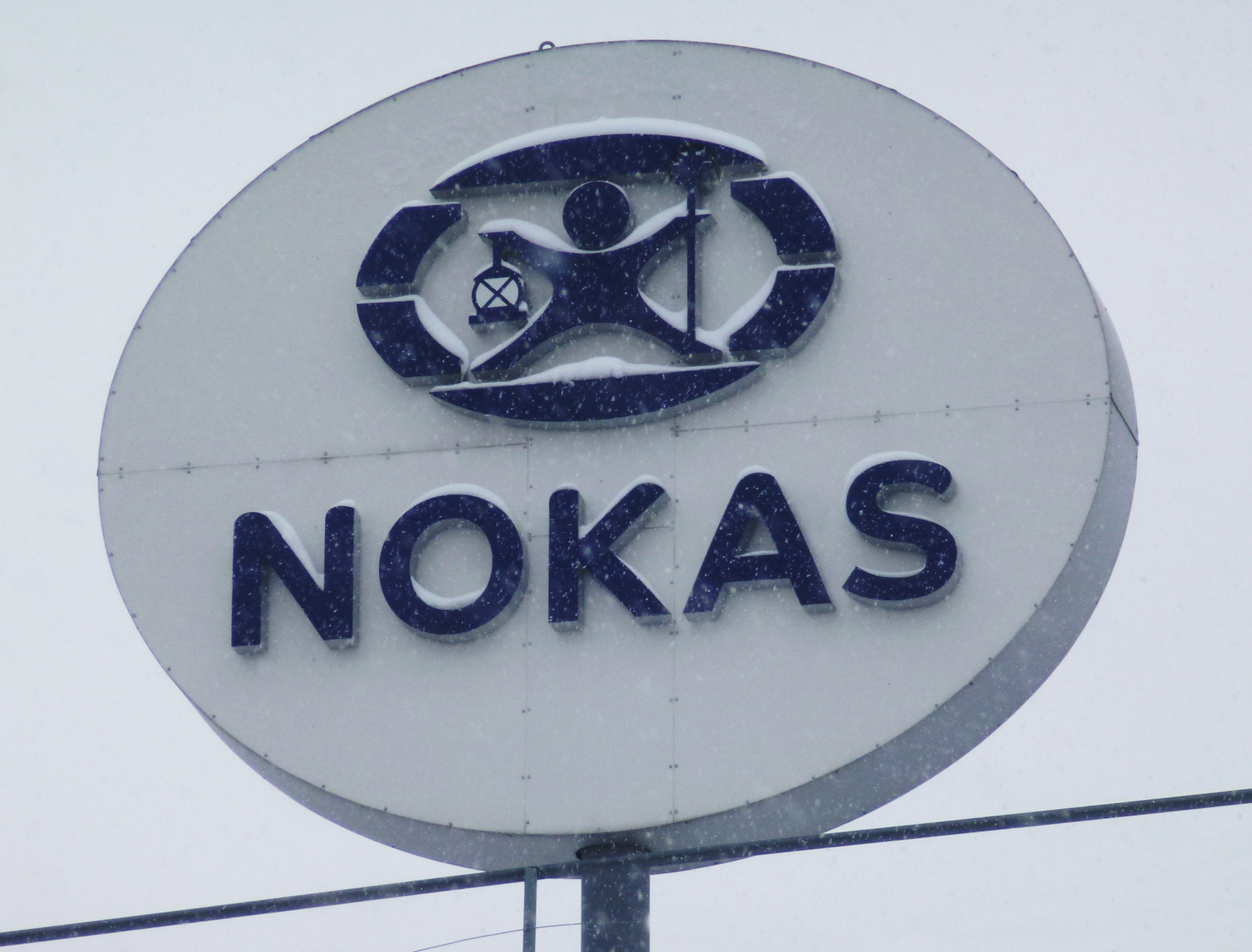
- Company type: Private Security Company
- Industry: Security, safety and Cash Handling
- Founded: 1987; 39 years ago
- Headquarters: Tønsberg, Norway
- Area served: Norway, Sweden, Denmark, Germany, Poland, Netherlands, Finland
- Key people: Heine Wang (CEO)
- Net income: 2.500.000.000 NOK
- Number of employees: 4,000
- Website: www.nokas.no

Nokas AS is a Norwegian security company established in 1987 as Vakt Service AS. The company is headquartered in Tønsberg. The largest shareholders is Orkla ASA and Wang Invest AS who are owned by Heine Wang, who is the company's CEO. Paal Wang, who is Executive Director, has a stake through his company PTW Holding AS.

In 2010 the group changed its name from Vakt Service AS to Nokas AS. The group is divided into two divisions, Nokas Cash Handling and Nokas Security. This is according to the CEO Heine Wang: "The Group is in a European market. We established operations in Sweden in 2008 and Denmark in this year. It was therefore necessary to have a stronger name. Vakt Service also provides associations that we are exclusively engaged in security. The business Guard is obviously still a very important priority, but not the only one," explains Wang.

Vakt Service acquired 100% of the shares in the Norsk Kontantservice (Nokas Cash Handling) in October 2007, while DnB NOR Bank ASA had a stake of 4.7% in Vakt Service. In May 2007, Vakt Service AS 40.3% stake in Nokas after having taken over the Terra Group's ownership interest.

== See also ==
- NOKAS robbery
