= Nokas Cash Handling =

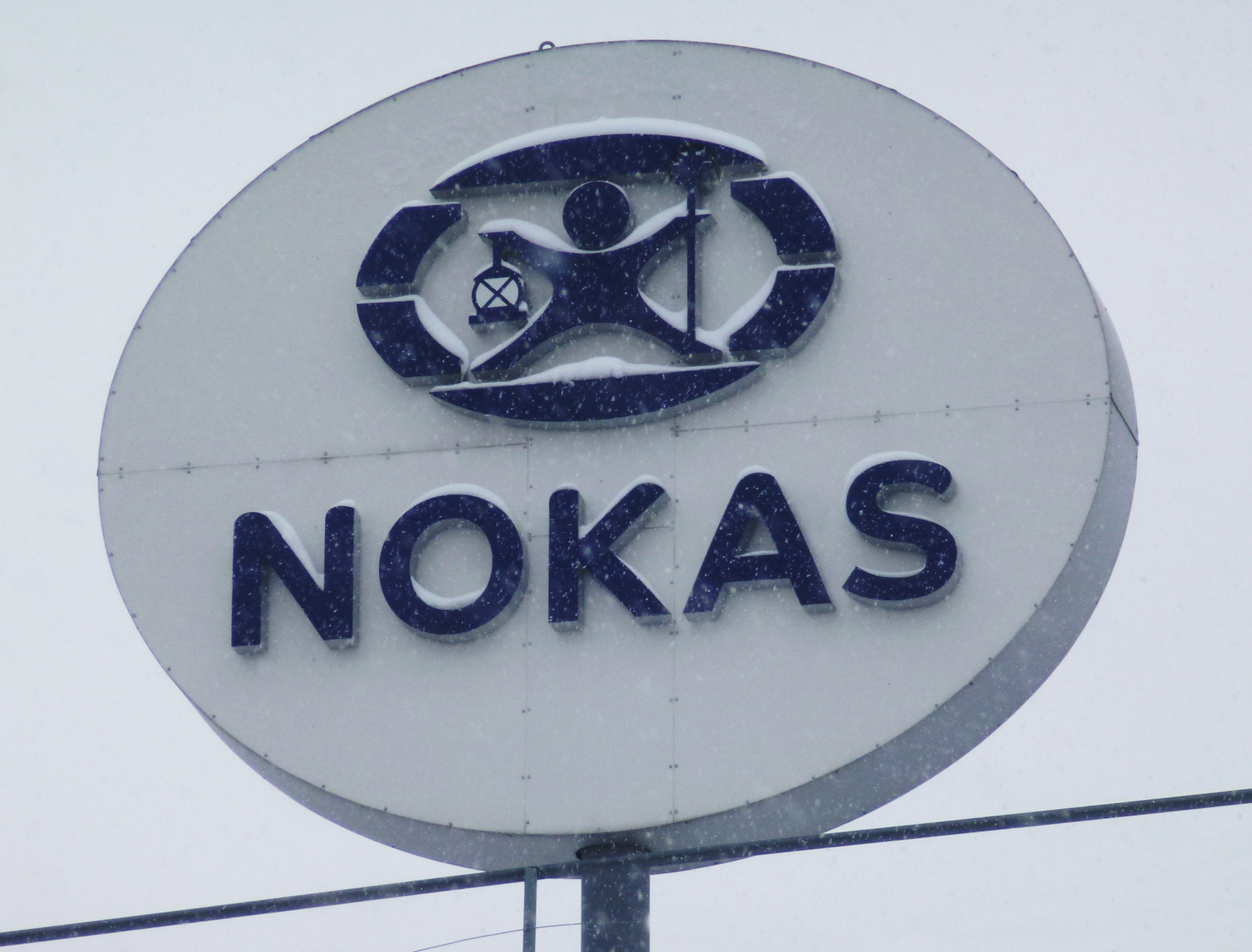
- Nokas sign in Västberga.
- Founded: 2001
- Headquarters: Oslo, Norway
- Number of employees: 166 (2026)
- Parent: Nokas AS

Nokas Cash Handling (former Norsk Kontantservice AS) is a Norwegian company offering management, control and distribution of cash to Norwegian banks, headquartered in Oslo. The company is owned 100% by Nokas AS. In 2008, the company had a revenue of 458 million kr and a net income of NOK 27 million.

Nokas Cash Handling was established in 2001, when services previously provided by the Bank of Norway and several individual banks were taken over by a third party. In 2007, the security company Hafslund and several banks, including Danske Bank, Sparebank 1 Gruppen, Sparebanken Hedmark and DnB NOR sold their shares to Vakt Service, who took full control of the company after previously owning 40.3% of the company. In 2009, the office in Lillehammer was closed, 20 people were downsized and the operations for the region moved to Oslo.

== NOKAS Robbery ==
The NOKAS cash depot in Stavanger was robbed on 5 April 2004. The outcome of the robbery was just below NOK 60 million, which makes it the largest in Norwegian history. It was also the first time in many years that a Norwegian police officer had been killed in the line of duty. The thirteen men involved in the NOKAS robbery were convicted to a total of 181 years in prison on 10 March 2006, with the leader, David Toska, receiving the highest verdict of 19 years. In the final trial, standing on 19 January 2007, twelve of the thirteen were found guilty. The thirteenth, the judges put the jury decision aside and ordered a new trial.
