= Ulrik Fredrik Malt =

Norwegian psychiatrist

Ulrik Fredrik Malt (born 1946) is a Norwegian psychiatrist. He was a consultant psychiatrist at Oslo University Hospital, Rikshospitalet, and was Director of the Department of Neuropsychiatry and Psychosomatic Medicine from 1987 to 2013. Since 2014 he is a senior consultant, Department of Research and Education, Division of Surgery and Clinical Neuroscience, Oslo University Hospital. Holding a position of Professor II at the University of Oslo since 1988, in 2016 he became professor emeritus.

He took his examen artium in 1965 and studied medicine at the universities of Munster, Germany and Oslo, Norway, graduating as cand.med. in 1973. He became a specialist in psychiatry in 1987 and got his dr.med. degree also in 1987. He has been editor and author of several textbooks of psychiatry (in Norwegian) and has authored chapters in international textbooks of psychiatry. He has been responsible for all articles on psychiatry and psychology in the encyclopedia Store norske leksikon.

In 2012, he testified as an expert witness in the trial of Anders Behring Breivik. According to Malt, Breivik has Asperger syndrome, possibly Tourette syndrome and narcissistic personality disorder. He could not with 100% confidence rule out paranoid psychosis (delusional disorder) although he found it less than 50% likely. The conclusion of Asperger syndrome was rebutted by Eirik Johannesen, but supported by child psychiatrist Per Olav Næss who treated Breivik when he was admitted to child psychiatric care 3–4 years of age.
