= Delta (Norwegian police unit) =

Norwegian Police Tactical Unit

Beredskapstroppen
- Active: 1976–present
- Country: Norway
- Agency: Norwegian Police Service
- Type: Police tactical unit
- Role: Counter-terrorism; Law enforcement
- Common name: Delta

Commanders
- Current commander: Freddy Rotseth
- Notable commanders: Anders Snortheimsmoen

Notables
- Significant operation(s): Torp hostage crisis Kosovo War (Through Special Team Six); 2011 Norway attacks

Beredskapstroppen ('Emergency Unit'), callsign "Delta", is the police tactical unit of the Norwegian Police Service. Its members are trained to perform dangerous operations such as high-risk arrests and hostage situations. It is organizationally part of Oslo Police District, but is responsible for the whole country, including oil installations in the North Sea.

The unit has participated in several incidents including the Torp hostage crisis at Sandefjord Airport, Torp on 29 September 1994, the aftermath of the NOKAS robbery and the 2011 Norway attacks. The members have a wider variety of weapons than the ordinary police force, including SIG Sauer P226 pistols and Diemaco C8 rifles. Members spend half their time training and preparing for missions and the remaining participating in ordinary law enforcement work in Oslo.

== History ==
=== Operations ===
According to Delta's web site, they conduct in average almost one armed operation every day. In 2004, for instance, they conducted 422 armed missions and only fired their weapons twice.

One of Delta's most dramatic missions was the Torp hostage crisis, where an elderly couple and two police officers were taken hostages by two criminals. In the end of the two-day drama, Delta executed a rescue operation rescuing all of the hostages and killing one hostage taker and arresting the other. In the aftermath of the fatal NOKAS robbery, Delta arrested many suspects involved with the robbery. Since October 2006, Delta has focused their operations against gang crime in the capital of Oslo and arrested many criminals and seized many weapons used by the gangs.

==== 2011 Oslo / Utøya attacks ====
Delta were first responders at Utøya and subsequently apprehended Anders Behring Breivik, the perpetrator of the 2011 Norway attacks in Oslo and Utøya on 22 July 2011.

==== Deployment in Special Team Six ====
Members of the unit have been deployed in Special Team Six (ST6), a multinational United Nations Interim Administration Mission in Kosovo (UNMIK) police tactical unit, many times. One of the unit's most important tasks was to arrest war criminals. According to one of the Delta operators, during a rescue mission, grenades and bullets flew over their heads while ST6 rescued 50-60 persons from furious Albanians. This incident was a rescue of United Nations personnel trapped in a building. ST6 was commanded by a Norwegian operator from Delta during this mission and during the period January–July 2004. Beredskapstroppen has had personnel deployed in ST6 ever since its foundation.

== Equipment ==
Weapons

- Heckler & Koch P30 semi-automatic pistol
- SIG Sauer P226 semi-automatic pistol
- SIG Sauer P320 semi-automatic pistol
- Heckler & Koch MP5 submachine gun
- Diemaco C8 assault rifle
- SCAR-H battle rifle
- SIG-Sauer SSG 3000 sniper rifle
- Barrett MRAD sniper rifle
- HK169 grenade launcher/less-lethal weapon
- Remington 870 pump-action shotgun for door breaching

Vehicles

The unit frequently drove unmarked Mercedes Geländewagen, marked and unmarked Chevrolet Suburbans, Unmarked BMW X5s and marked and unmarked Volvo V70s. Delta has recently started utilizing new 2009 Mercedes MLs and armoured Toyota Landcruisers as a replacement for the older Volvo V70 and Chevrolet Suburban. Delta also has two Rigid-hulled inflatable boats. The type has three engines with a total of 675 HP. For air transport Delta mainly make use of military Bell 412 SP from the Royal Norwegian Air Force. In 2020 Delta adopted new unmarked Volvo XC90's for formal protection details.

Other

The operators use a special type of visor on their helmets which can withstand 9mm bullets. The French National Gendarmerie Intervention Group also reportedly use this visor. The unit uses a gas mask with a closed system (rebreather). They use advanced equipment to determine the type of chemicals they are up against. Their uniforms differ from those normally worn by the men and women of the Norwegian Police Service; instead of the normal black pants and blue shirts they wear black jumpsuits.
