= Ringerike Prison =

Prison in Ringerike, Norway

Ringerike Prison (Norwegian: Ringerike fengsel) is located in Ringerike municipality, just south of the small town of Tyristrand, Norway, not far from Tyrifjorden. The total area within the wall covers approximately 74 acres.

Ringerike prison is a large, closed high-security institution located in the Southern Region in the Norwegian Correctional Services, with police custody, long-term and high risk prisoners as the primary groups. The prison is surrounded by a 7 metres (23 ft) high and 1,068 metres (1,168 yd) long wall.

The planning of a new prison in Ringerike went on for decades, as the former prison in Hønefoss was both impractical and outdated. Planning started in 1992, and the complex was completed in early 1997. The first inmates were received in February, and today the prison has a capacity of 160 inmates.

== Notable Inmates ==
- Anders Behring Breivik, perpetrator of the 2011 Norway attacks
