= Kristin Skogen Lund =

Norwegian business leader (born 1966)

- Born: 11 August 1966 (age 60)
- Education: University of Oregon; INSEAD; Norwegian Defence University College
- Occupation: Business executive
- Years active: 1992–present
- Known for: Former CEO of Schibsted
- Title: Chair of INSEAD; Chair of Delivery Hero
- Board member of: INSEAD; Delivery Hero; Norwegian Refugee Council; Oslo Philharmonic; Mozilla
- Awards: Knight of the Legion of Honour

Kristin Skogen Lund (born 11 August 1966) is a Norwegian executive who served was CEO of Schibsted ASA from 2018 to 2024. She was the Director General of the Confederation of Norwegian Enterprise (NHO) from 2012 to 2018. She currently serves as Board Chair for several companies and organisations, including INSEAD and Delivery Hero.

== Early life and education ==
Kristin Skogen Lund grew up in Oslo. She attended University of Oregon in Eugene, where she obtained a B.A. with honours (Summa Cum Laude) in International Studies and Business Administration. She obtained her M.B.A. from INSEAD in Fontainebleau, France. Kristin Skogen Lund graduated from the Norwegian Defence University College Executive Programme during fall 2018.

== Career ==
=== Early career ===
From 1992 to 1995, Kristin Skogen Lund worked as a manager in Lever Europe. In 1995, she was hired in the Coca-Cola Company and was the director of Coca-Cola Beverages Sweden from 1997 to 1998. In 1998, she was hired by Scandinavia Online and became CEO before the turn of the year. From 2003 to 2004, she was the CEO of Scanpix. In 2004, she moved to Aftenposten AS—publisher of the newspaper Aftenposten—and in 2007 became CEO. Aftenposten AS is owned 100% by Schibsted. Lund has held various board memberships within the Schibsted Group and in the Norwegian Chamber Orchestra, and she has been a member of the board of the Orkla Group.

=== Telenor (2009–2012) ===
In 2009, Kristin Skogen Lund left Aftenposten to become EVP (director) for Nordic activities within Telenor, in which capacity she served from February 2010 to November 2012. This included portfolio responsibility for Telenor Norway, Telenor Denmark, Telenor Sweden, Telenor Broadcast, Telenor Holding, Telenor Media and Content Services, and Telenor Digital Services, Her portfolio from September 2011 also included a global responsibility for development and digital services.

=== Confederation of Norwegian Enterprise (2012-2018) ===
From 2008, Skogen Lund served as Vice President of the Confederation of Norwegian Enterprise. In April 2010, she became acting president, after Paul-Christian Rieber suddenly stepped down. During summer 2010 she was formally elected as president of the organization for two years. In 2012, she became the Director general of the Confederation of Norwegian Enterprise.

=== Schibsted (2018-2024) ===
Skogen Lund was appointed CEO of Schibsted in 2018. As CEO of Schibsted from 2018 to 2024, Kristin Skogen Lund led extensive strategic changes to the group.

In 2019, Schibsted’s international marketplaces business was spun off into Adevinta. Schibsted and Skogen Lund subsequently played a key role in Adevinta’s acquisition of eBay Classifieds Group in 2020. As part of the transaction, parts of the business, including the Nordic marketplaces, were acquired by Schibsted.

In 2024, the group was split in two: the media operations were separated and acquired by the Tinius Trust and continued under the Schibsted name, while the marketplaces business continued as the publicly listed company Vend.

== Awards and recognition ==
Lund is the chair of the board for Delivery Hero, INSEAD, Stingray Marine Solutions, the Norwegian Refugee Council, and the Oslo Philharmonic. She is a board member for Mozilla.

From 2010, Lund was the chair of the board for Telenor Norway, Telenor Sweden, Telenor Denmark, Telenor Broadcast, Telenor Media & Content Services, and Comoyo AS. She was a board member of Ericsson AB from 2013 to 2018 and previously a board member of the Norwegian Chamber Orchestra Foundation. Lund has also been a board member of AutoStore, Orkla, Aftonbladet, the public limited companies Nordic Semiconductor, Umoe, and Sparebank 1 Oslo. She is also a council member of the think tank Civita.

Skogen Lund has been a member of The Global Commission on the Economy and Climate and the ILO Global Commission of the future of work. She has also been a member of the Executive Committee and heading the Norwegian delegation of the Trilateral Commission.

She was presented with the insignia of Knight of the French Legion of Honour in 2019, and recently headed the government appointed commission revising the Norwegian pension system.

Fortune in 2011 cited Skogen Lund among the "Fortune 50 Most Powerful Women in Business"— Skogen Lund being number 38 in the ranking. She was similarly featured on the "10 Global women on the rise" list. The Norwegian business magazine Kapital has two years in a row put her on the top of the list of Norway's most powerful women.

Business positions
Preceded by Paul-Christian Rieber	President of the Confederation of Norwegian Enterprise; 2010–2012	Succeeded by Heine Wang
Preceded by John G. Bernander	Chief executive of the Confederation of Norwegian Enterprise; 2012–2018	Succeeded by Ole Erik Almlid
