= Deadline Torp =

- Directed by: Nils Gaup
- Written by: Jo Nesbø, Dag Erik Pedersen
- Produced by: Anne Birte Brunvold Tørstad
- Starring: Emil Forselius, Jørgen Langhelle, Gørild Mauseth, Sverre Anker Ousdal, Rut Tellefsen, Ingvar Hirdwall
- Cinematography: Rolv Håan
- Edited by: Anne Andressen
- Release date: 13 January 2005
- Running time: 116 minutes
- Country: Norway
- Languages: Norwegian, Swedish

Deadline Torp, also known as Torp-Dramaet, is a TV miniseries co-written by crime author Jo Nesbø based on the true events of the 1994 Torp hostage crisis. It was produced for the Norwegian Broadcasting Corporation.

It tells the true story of the Torp hostage crisis that took place in Sandefjord Municipality in Vestfold county, Norway. It began on 28 September 1994 and lasted for two days. Two men from Sweden robbed a bank in a small Norwegian town and a large police hunt was initiated. The robbers eventually took two civilians and two police officers hostages. The following morning at Sandefjord Airport Torp, the hostage drama came to a deadly end when a police chief, for the first time in Norwegian history, gave an order to shoot to kill.
