= National Task Force =

Swedish police unit

- Ordningspolisens nationella insatsstyrka (Swedish)
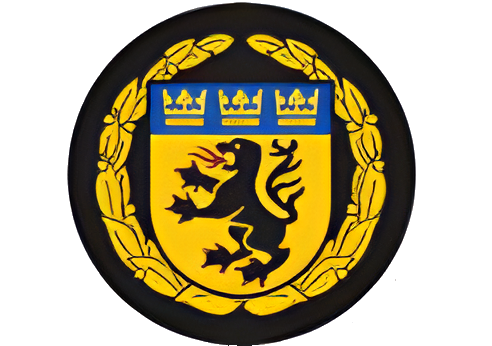
- Active: 1991–present
- Country: Sweden
- Agency: Swedish Police Authority
- Type: Police tactical unit
- Role: Counter-terrorism; Law enforcement
- Part of: National Operations Department
- Motto: "Posse Ante Factum Audere Cum Convenit"; To be prepared before it happens, to dare when it happens
- Abbreviation: NI

Structure
- Officers: Approx. 60

Commanders
- Current commander: Hampus Nygårds

Notables
- Significant operation(s): Various hostage operations Capture of Mijailo Mijailović and several suspect terrorists

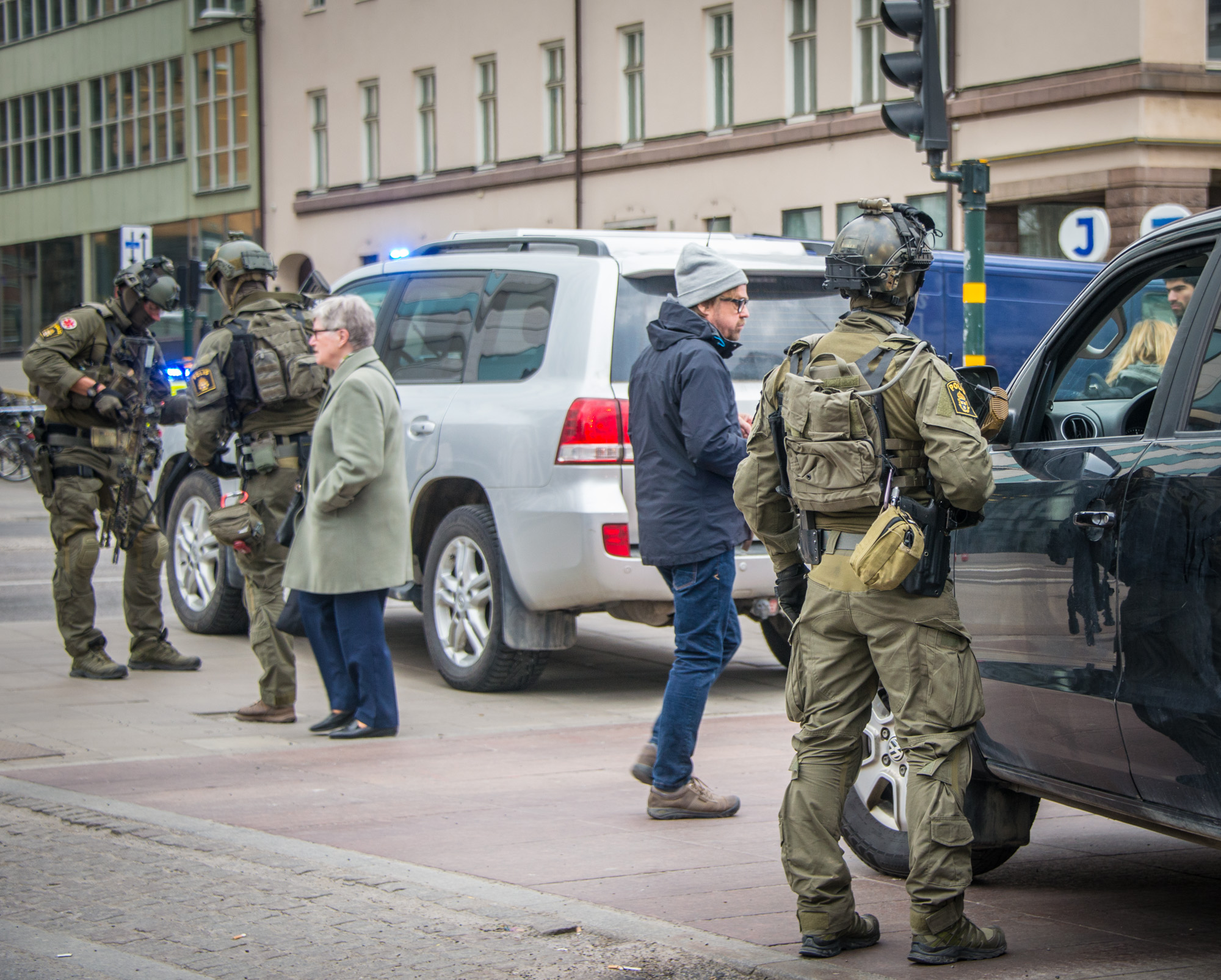
National Task Force operators during the 2017 Stockholm truck attack.

The National Task Force (Swedish: Nationella insatsstyrkan, NI) is the counter-terrorism unit within the National Operations Department of the Swedish Police Authority. It is a part of the National Intervention Concept (Swedish: Nationella insatskonceptet, NIK) which also includes regional task force groups.

== History ==
After the assassination of Olof Palme in 1986, two state commissions were appointed to assess Sweden's counter-terrorism capabilities.

As a result, the government ordered the Swedish National Police Board to organize the "Standby Force Against Terrorism" (Beredskapsstyrkan mot terrorism) within the Stockholm County Police Authority in 1990.

The group was soon renamed Nationella insatsstyrkan and became also a resource for the whole of Sweden. The right to make decisions about when they were used was delegated by the government to the Swedish National Police Board.

After a parliamentary decision in 2002, the NTF was transferred from the Stockholm County Police Authority to the National Criminal Police (Rikskriminalpolisen).

In connection with the reorganization of the police in 2015, the NTF was placed under the National Operations Department.

== Tasks and operations ==
The NTF is meant to handle extraordinarily difficult or life-threatening criminal situations, such as terrorism and hostage situations.

The main tasks of the unit includes:

- Counter terrorism
- Hostage rescue
- Special reconnaissance
- High risk arrests
- Maritime operations
- Negotiation in crisis situations
- Reinforced close protection
- Securing evidence in complex or high risk situations

The unit also conducts intervention tasks in cities or areas located outside of the area of responsibility of the reinforced regional task forces of Stockholm, Gothenburg and Malmö, and that are too complex for the regional task forces of the non-metropolitan regions to handle.

The NTF has participated in international operations in an advisory role. They regularly accompany the personal protection details of the Swedish Security Service abroad, providing a CAT (counter assault team) capability. They were also deployed aboard the Swedish Coast Guard vessels participating in the EU-led border security operation Triton, acting as a boarding party.

== Organization ==
The NTF has one head of the unit with a number of subordinated coordinators, and a staff of experienced police officers from the unit. Under this management group the force is divided into 8 groups:

- Alpha
- Bravo
- Charlie
- Delta
- Echo
- Fox (snipers)
- Golf (snipers)
- Hotel (divers)

The NTF is part of the National Intervention Concept (NIK). Launched in 2015, this concept standardized and regulated the employment, structure and capabilities of the Swedish police's tactical units.

The NIK divides the various tactical units into three levels of capabilities:

National capability: Provided by the NTF

Reinforced regional capability: Provided by the RRTF (Piketen) in regions Stockholm, West and South.

General regional capability: Provided by regional tactical teams dispersed throughout their respective region. This capability exists in regions North, East, Mid and Bergslagen.

== Selection ==
The unit recruits operators bi-annually. To be eligible for service with the NTF the applicant is required to have completed either:

- Police training: Two and a half year in length (including probationary service period)
- Minimum of 4 years of continuous service in either the military, coast guard or customs

Applicants who meet the basic requirements are then tested on their physical and psychological stamina during two 2 day periods.

If successful they're invited to attend a grueling 10 day selection course in the field. At the end of the recruitment process an average of 6-10% of the candidates remain and progress to the roughly 7 months long operator training course.

Candidates not already serving as police officers undergo a shorter, compressed police training roughly 18 months in length (including a 6-month probationary service period) to become badged police officers prior to attending the operator training course.

== Service ==
Members of the NTF work full-time in the force.

At the units inception the operators used to work two weeks on the unit followed by two weeks of regular police work, but as the need for them increased they changed it to full-time to cope with the demand and the need for more training. Most members have prior military service and as of recently direct application from the military to the unit is possible.

About 50% of the day-to-day work is dedicated to training, with the remaining 50% consisting of readiness and operational missions. The majority of the units operational taskings comes from the Swedish Security Service, being the agency with the primary responsibility for counter terrorism and counter extremism. The unit perform roughly 100 operational missions per year.

The NTF has a close and active cooperation with the military, they have aviation support via the Air Force's UH-60 Black Hawks and regularly train with their military counterpart, the Special Operations Task Group.

The NTF also has an active cooperation with several equivalent units in Europe in place via the ATLAS counter terrorism network, especially with other Nordic units such as the Danish AKS and the Norwegian Delta.

For maritime operations the NTF is supported by the Coast Guard, whose National boarding group operates rigid-hulled inflatable boats.

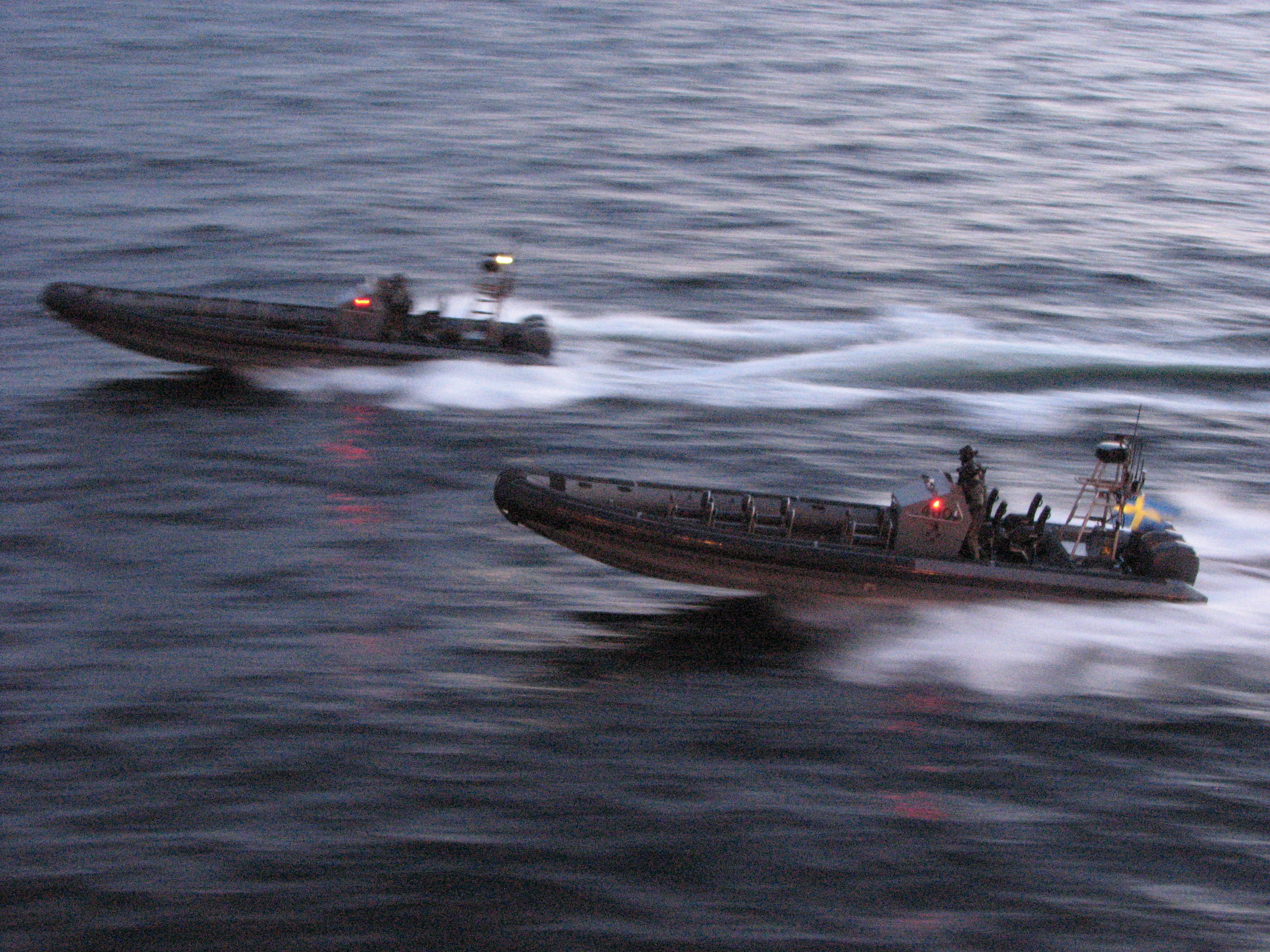
RHIB's from the National boarding group.

== Equipment ==
The special equipment of the NTF is significantly different from that of the ordinary police. Operators are equipped with different radios, as wells as vest and uniforms from American manufacturer Crye Precision, ballistic Ops Core helmets and AN/PVS-31 night vision goggles. They distinguish themselves from other Swedish police by the green uniforms worn while operating in uniform.

Model	Type	Caliber	Origin	Notes
SIG Sauer P226	Semi-automatic pistol	9×19mm Parabellum	Germany	Previously issued sidearm
Glock	Semi-automatic pistol	9×19mm Parabellum	Austria	Current issued sidearm
Heckler & Koch MP5	Submachine gun	9×19mm Parabellum	Germany	Standard issue SMG
LWRC M6	Assault rifle	5.56×45mm NATO	United States	Standard issue rifle
LWRC REPR	Sniper rifle	7.62x51mm NATO	United States	Standard issue rifle
Sako TRG M10	Sniper rifle	.338 Lapua Magnum.	Finland	Issued to snipers

== Commanders ==
- ????–2010 – Bertil Olofsson
- 2010–2015 – Marie Jarnérus
- 2015–present – Hampus Nygårds

== Similar units ==
- Germany – GSG 9
- France – RAID
- United States – FBI Hostage Rescue Team
- Denmark – AKS
- Norway – Delta
- United Kingdom – SCO19
- Finland - SIU
- South Africa - Special Task Force

== See also ==
- Law enforcement in Sweden
- Reinforced Regional Task Force (Piketen)
