= Heine Wang =

Norwegian businessperson (born 1963)

Heine Wang (born 22 April 1963) is a Norwegian businessperson.

He founded the private security company Vakt Service in Tønsberg in 1987 together with his brother Pål Wang and friend Rune Hogsnes. In twenty years, the company expanded to become one of the big three in private security in Norway, together with Securitas and Group 4 Securicor. The company later became Nokas, with Wang as the chief executive officer.

He also became active in the employers' association NHO Service as board member, and also vice president of the nationwide Confederation of Norwegian Enterprise. In September 2012 he headed the appointment committee in the Confederation of Norwegian Enterprise which made president Kristin Skogen Lund the new chief executive. As a result, Wang was promoted from vice president to president. He was succeeded in 2013. Wang was also a member of Tønsberg city council from 1995 to 2003.

Business positions
Preceded by Kristin Skogen Lund	President of the Confederation of Norwegian Enterprise; 2012–2013	Succeeded by Tore Ulstein
