= Torp hostage crisis =

1994 crime in Torp, Norway

- Location: Sandefjord Airport, Torp, Norway
- Date: 28–29 September 1994
- Attack type: Hostage-taking
- Weapon: Handguns
- Deaths: 1 (hostage-taker)
- Injuries: No injuries
- Perpetrators: Resid Koca and Zvonimir Majdek
- Motive: Unknown

The Torp hostage crisis occurred on 28 September 1994 at Sandefjord Airport, Torp, Norway. Two Swedish robbers took two police officers and two pensioners as hostages. The police freed the hostages and killed one of the hostage takers. It is the only peacetime incident in which a Norwegian chief of police has given the order to shoot to kill.

== Events ==
Swedish citizens Resid Koca, originally from Serbia, and Zvonimir Majdek, originally from Croatia, stole 1.5 million kroner from a small post office in Østre Halsen in Larvik Municipality. Their car broke down during the escape, and they eventually ended up in the homes of an elderly couple in Larvik after taking a 44-year-old female police officer as hostage the night after the robbery. A negotiator from Sandefjord Municipality police station was brought in to negotiate with the hostage takers and communicated with them through police radio, which meant that the entire press was able to listen in. They were led to believe that they would be given an airplane at the nearest airport, Torp, but upon arrival they quickly realised that they had been fooled.

In an attempt to give the hostage takers new batteries for the police radio, the negotiator was himself taken hostage. He was then told that he was going to be killed if the demands of the kidnappers were not met, which was a sum of US$10 million and passage out of the country within the hour. He was forced to do the countdown to his own execution, every five minutes from 8:30. At 8:58, he reported over the radio, "it's now 2 minutes until I will get shot". A few seconds later, the police tactical unit Delta launched an attack that saved all the hostages and killed Resid Koca. He was killed instantaneously by a Delta sniper. This is the only time a direct order to shoot to kill has been given in Norway during peace time.

Due to the MS Estonia sinking, the incident received little press attention, although a miniseries titled Deadline Torp was made for the Norwegian Broadcasting Corporation (NRK), in 2005. It has since been released on DVD.
