= Kjell Alrich Schumann =

Norwegian robber and murderer (1966–2025)

- Born: 8 April 1966; Norway
- Died: 26 February 2025 (aged 58); Norway
- Known for: The NOKAS robbery

Kjell Alrich Schumann (8 April 1966 – 26 February 2025) was a Norwegian convicted of killing a police officer during the NOKAS robbery.

== Biography ==
Schumann confessed on 27 September 2006, that he killed police officer Arne Sigve Klungland - who became 53 years old, during the NOKAS robbery.

Schumann was sentenced to 16 years' imprisonment ('forvaring'). He was released in 2014 after serving ten years in prison.

Schumann studied agriculture at vocational school level ('landbruksskole').

Schumann died from brain cancer on 26 February 2025 in his home municipality of Åsnes at the Finn Forest in Norway, at the age of 58.

Shortly after his passing there was done tagging at the Forest Museum in Elverum to commemorate him by an unknown person / unknown people, with the message "Rest In Peace, Kjell Alrich Schumann" and "ACAB" and "FTP", which respectively stands for - "All Cops Are Bastards" and "Fuck The Police".

It ended up in the lokal newspaper Østlendingen, which interpreted it as a hateful message, with an encouragement for the local population to tip the police if they knew anything.

One of the people who robbed Nokas together with him - Metkel Betew, was in a rather special interview in the Norwegian state's news and entertainment channel - NRK, which was about their relationship and how Schumann had gotten the message he would pass away, just some months before Schumann passed. It's special since not long after Schumann's passing Betew was murdered.

It's not known to be any connection and it's not suggested either, it's simply notable how Betew went on an interview about "how just one of them could live further", and then he passed as well.
