= Reinforced Regional Task Force =

Swedish special operations police unit

Reinforced Regional Task Force (Piketen)
- Active: 1979–present
- Country: Sweden
- Branch: Swedish Police Authority
- Type: Police tactical unit
- Role: Hostage rescue High-risk arrests Riot control Counter terrorism
- Size: ~200 operators
- Garrison/HQ: Stockholm; Gothenburg; Malmö

Reinforced Regional Task Force (Swedish: Förstärkt Regional Insatsstyrka), prior to 2015 officially known as Piketen (or Piketenheten) (Note: From Swedish piket (borrowed from French: piquet) meaning "task force", and enheten meaning "the unit", i.e. Piketen = The Task Force, Piketenheten = The Task Force Unit.) is a regional special operations asset of the Swedish Police Authority, similar to SWAT type units in the United States.

RRTF is called upon when situations occur that are too dangerous for ordinary police to handle such as hostage situations, serving high-risk arrest warrants and confronting armed criminals.

The main responsibility of the RRTF is interventions in dangerous situations or dangerous environments, e.g. hostage situations and situations including armed dangerous suspects. Other duties are riot control, escorting VIP's/objects of value and serving high-risk arrest warrants etc.

== History ==
RRTF, formerly known as Piketen, has been active since 1979. Its creation was an answer to the events of the Norrmalmstorg robbery in 1973, where robber Jan-Erik "Janne" Olsson took four hostages at Kreditbanken at Norrmalmstorg ("Norrmalm's Square") in Stockholm.

RRTF operators from Malmö and Gothenburg have been deployed with the EULEX Intervention Group in Kosovo (Special Team Six), tasked with high-risk operations such as hostage rescue and arresting armed criminals.

In 2011, the RRTF officially opened up for any female officers who wish to serve in the unit though none have passed selection yet.

Due to the major reorganization efforts of 2015, Piketen was reclassified as "Förstärkt Regional Insatsstyrka", or in English, "Reinforced Regional Task Force", RRTF.

== Organization ==
The RRTFs are stationed in the three largest cities of Sweden: Stockholm, Gothenburg and Malmö, providing a day round, year round tactical intervention capability in Police regions Stockholm, West and South.

However the units can at request be put to use nationwide all over Sweden.

The RRTFs are part of the National Intervention Concept (NIK). Launched in 2015, this concept standardized and regulated the employment, structure and capabilities of the Swedish polices tactical units.

The NIK divides the various tactical units into three levels of capabilities:

National capability	Reinforced regional capability	General regional capability
National Task Force	RRTF (Piketen) in Stockholm, West and South	Regional tactical teams dispersed North, East, Mid and Bergslagen.

== Training ==
To be eligible for RRTF selection an officer must have at least 18 months of service, but exceptions can be made if the applicant possesses skills or experiences valuable for the units.

After a series of physical and psychological tests successful applicants progress to a final week long field exercise, commonly known as "hell week". Applicants who successfully complete "hell week" then progress to 6 months of training before claiming an operational slot with their unit.

The selection and training process has an attrition rate of roughly 90%.

== Daily duties ==
The RRTFs spend about 30% of their time on training, which is mainly focused on high-risk intervention.

For example; one or multiple dangerous perpetrators in rural terrain or in an urban environment and perpetrators in houses or vehicles (also including hostage rescue). Such dangerous interventions require a lot of advanced tactical training.

The unit's officers are well-trained in different methods of entry (MOE), such as rappelling and door breaching. They also receive training in close target reconnaissance, close quarters battle, TCCC, self-defense, and various weapon systems.

Officers are then specially trained as medics, breachers, specialist drivers etc.

== Gear ==
All operators are equipped with ballistic Ops Core helmets, plate carriers and flame retardant clothing.

Both the NTF and RRTFs were equipped with Sandcats these vehicles have since been transferred to the Police EOD.

The units strives to resolve any given situation as calmly as possible to avoid injury or loss of life and uses highly trained negotiators when tactically possible. Circumstances dictate whether officers operate in uniform or civilian clothing.

They mostly make use of unmarked civilian vehicles, primarily Toyota Land Cruisers and Volkswagen Multivans, or special assault vehicles.

Model	Type	Caliber	Origin	Notes
SIG Sauer P226	Semi-automatic pistol	9×19mm Parabellum	Germany	Current standard sidearm
Glock 17	Semi-automatic pistol	9×19mm Parabellum	Austria	Future standard sidearm
Heckler & Koch MP5	Submachine gun	9×19mm Parabellum	Germany	Standard issue SMG
LWRC M6	Assault rifle	5.56×45mm NATO	United States	Standard issue rifle
LWRC REPR	Sniper rifle	7.62x51mm NATO	United States	

== Similar units ==
- Sweden – National Task Force
- Germany – SEK
- France – RAID
- United States – FBI SWAT

== Notes and references ==
- "Efterlyst". Efterlyst Special. Season 2. Episode 1 (in Swedish). 2013-05-28. TV3.
- "Efterlyst". Efterlyst Special. Season 2. Episode 2 (in Swedish). 2013-06-04. TV3.
- "Piketen" (in Swedish). Swedish Police Authority.

== See also ==
- Law enforcement by country
- List of special law enforcement units
