= NOKAS robbery =

2004 bank robbery in Stavanger, Norway

Coordinates: 58.969194°N 5.729889°E

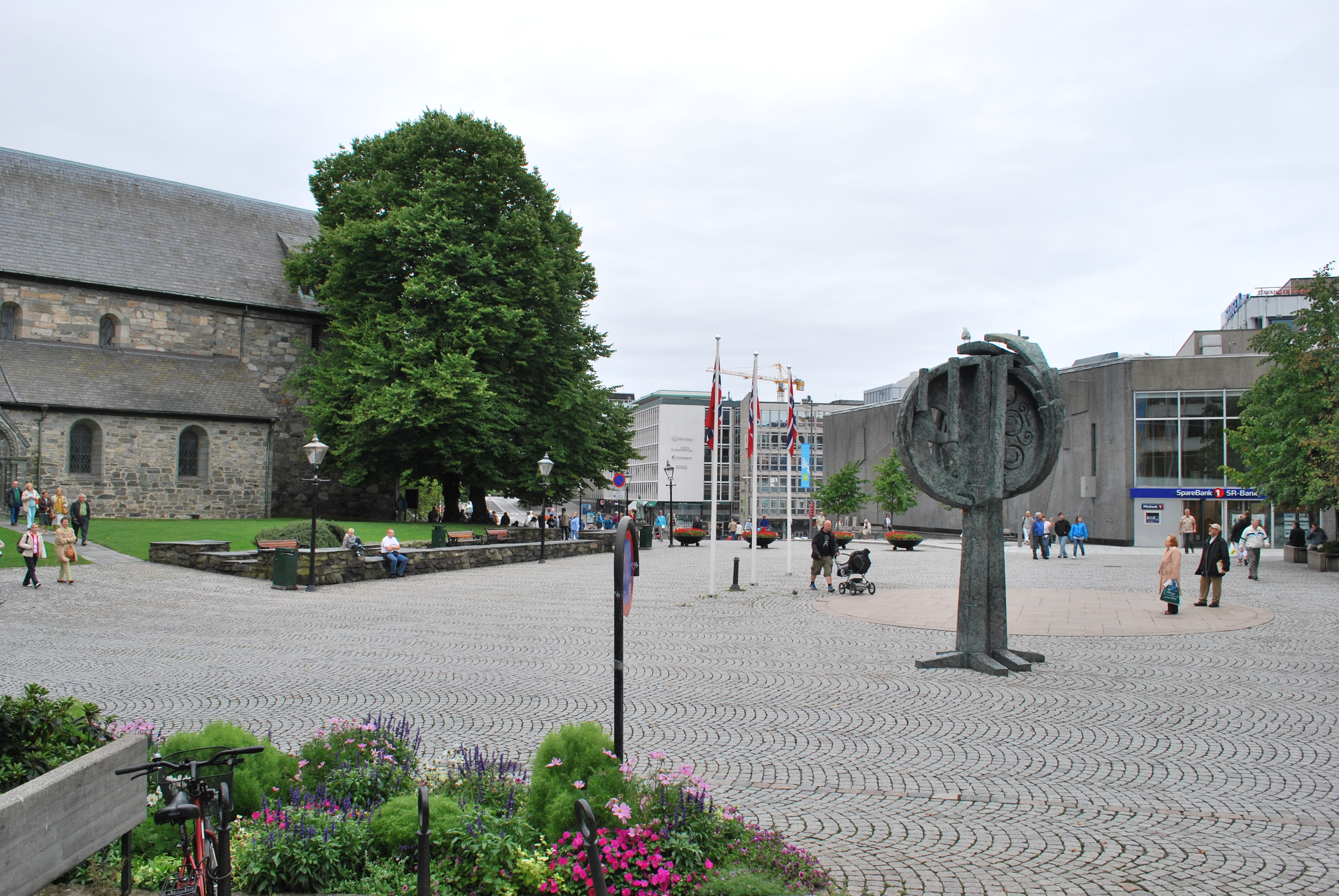
- Site of the NOKAS robbery
- Location: Kongensgate, Stavanger, Norway
- Date: 5 April 2004; 8 AM (UTC+1)
- Target: NOKAS cash depot
- Attack type: Bank robbery, police shootout
- Weapons: AG-3 battle rifle; AK-47 assault rifle; MP5 submachine gun; M1 Carbine; .45 ACP pistol
- Deaths: Arne Sigve Klungland (police lieutenant)
- Perpetrator: 13 people

On 5 April 2004, at 8 am the NOKAS cash depot in Stavanger, Norway was raided by heavily armed men. It was the biggest heist in Norwegian history.

Although the police had intelligence that a raid was expected in the coming days, they were understaffed and unprepared because of Easter, a national holiday in Norway. That morning, a bulletin was issued warning the NOKAS depot was a possible target.

Equipped to hold off the police, the gunmen wore bulletproof vests, helmets, ski masks, gloves and overalls, and were armed with automatic weapons and a .45 ACP pistol. Much of their equipment was military property from Madla Military Camp. The gunmen undertook extensive means to delay a police response while the NOKAS depot was attacked. The Stavanger Police HQ was blocked by a burning truck on the vehicle exit, smoke grenades were thrown at the front of the building and spike strips were spread across the road to burst the tires of police vehicles.

The raiders planned to gain access through a window overlooking a courtyard at the centre of the office block, believing it would not be adequately protected as it was an old building. The raid was to last 8 minutes if all went to plan but it all began to unravel as it became clear the bank was protected by bullet-proof glass. To break the window, first a sledgehammer and a battering ram were used and then 113 shots were fired at the window with automatic weapons. During this time the employees escaped before seven gunmen finally gained access to the ground floor of the NOKAS building.

Outside, several gunmen held positions on Cathedral Square at the front of the bank. When the police arrived, shots were exchanged with the gunmen. Police Lieutenant Arne Sigve Klungland was shot dead. The perpetrators escaped with 57.4 million kroner (~US$8 million in 2004) in national and foreign currencies, making it Norway's largest-ever robbery. Of the total, 51 million kroner are still to be recovered.

The 37 NOKAS employees received compensation worth a total of nine million kroner due to the trauma they suffered during the robbery.

This robbery is the basis for a movie titled Nokas, which premiered on 1 October 2010.

== Preparation ==
David Toska, an Oslo native, was the ring leader of the NOKAS gunmen. His accomplices were former inmates, school friends and recent acquaintances. He began to plan the raid on the NOKAS cash depot in November 2003, after a contact described the building to him and what seemed to be a blind spot in the building's security. Living in Skjeneholen with his girlfriend and newborn son, he rented a flat near Stavanger used as a rendezvous point for him and his accomplices to prepare and dress for the raid.

== Police warning ==
It became clear during the trial that police had intelligence warning that a heist was expected. Officer Arne Hammersmark gave an account of the following points in his testimony:

- potential getaway vehicles were stolen in Hamar (Ford Expedition)
- a Volvo XC allegedly linked to Kjell Alrich Schumann was seen in the area
- at the same time several cash dispensers were attacked
- and all this in central-eastern Norway, where Schumann is known to operate.

Added to this, several key elements had gone underground and rumours were rife they had taken up residence in the Stavanger area. Security had also observed possible surveillance of the Nokas office and transport vans.

== Timeline ==
5 April 2004

03:30
Seven or eight robbers are picked up from the townhouse in Skjeneholen and driven to Oppmarsjplassen in a grove near Tennisland. The van then returned to Skjeneholen and retrieved the remaining men as well as mattresses, bedding and towels in an attempt to destroy all genetic evidence. The materials would later be doused in petrol and set alight outside the police station.
06:55
Kjell Alrich Schumann is observed at the Cathedral Square. Two men are noticed acting suspiciously by Kverneland Brothers' old venue on Lågårdsveien.
07:00
A Ford Expedition (registration BP 50471) is caught on CCTV on Lagårdsveien Street. Three seconds later, the stolen truck follows.
07:16
The Ford Expedition passes the same surveillance camera traveling in the opposite direction (away from the town centre).
07:29
The third vehicle, a silver Saab 9-5 (registration DK 38262) is caught on CCTV at Lagårdsveien Street.
07:40
All eleven robbers are caught on CCTV on the other end of Lagårdsveien Street, fully equipped and armed for the robbery.
08:00
Johnny Thendrup drives the white truck down the ramp to Stavanger Police Station on Lagårdsveien Street, sets fire to it and throws tear gas canisters outside the main entrance to the police station.
08:01
A Range Rover (registration AX 72271) parks outside the cash depot. Seconds later the Saab parks outside St. Mary's Church.
08:02
Gunmen dressed in dark suits, gas masks and helmets exit the Range Rover and take positions outside to cover the escape route. They make their way through a side entrance to the inner courtyard and attempt to break in through a window with a sledgehammer and battering ram. The bullet proof glass doesn't collapse.
08:03
David Toska tries shooting at the window. The alarm is triggered. Toska goes back to Schumann and tells him to shoot at the window. He unleashes rapid fire at the window with his AG3 automatic weapon, emptying several magazines. Approximately 120 shots are fired. The window collapses.
08:05
Johnny Thendrup, who had set fire to the white truck, reaches Cathedral Square.
08:07
The Ford reaches Cathedral Square and stops next to the Saab.
08:08
Police officers Erik Haaland and Steffen Thesen arrive at Cathedral Square in a Volvo police car. They stop at Church Street and take up positions at the corner of the Hennes & Mauritz store. Inside the cash depot the gunmen begin loading cash into duffle bags. The theft amounts to NOK 57.4 million.
08:10
Kjell Alrich Schumann exits the NOKAS building.
08:12
Officer Fred Sherling in civilian clothing attempts to keep passers-by from straying near the gunmen. He comes nose to nose with Kjell Alrich Schumann. Schumann points his AG3 at Sherling and asks "Who are you?" Sherling raises his hands. Schumann orders Sherling to lie on the ground.
08:14
Gunfire is exchanged between police and gunmen around Cathedral Square. Johnny Thendrup receives a bullet in the right thigh from Sergeant Erik Håland's weapon. Håland fires a total of 17 shots during the stand off. His colleague Thesen fires three shots.
08:15
A passing cyclist, Olav Arnt Hopsdal is stopped and ordered to the ground by the gunman near Thendrup. Hopsdal thinks they are police marksmen. He realises later they were criminals.
08:17
Kjell Alrich Schumann fires his AG3 at a police car outside the Maritime Hotel, in King Street with police chief Arne Sigve Klungland inside. Klungland attempts to reverse but is obstructed by a bus. He is shot in the head and dies shortly afterwards. Officer Fred Sherling escapes as Schumann stops shooting at the police car to reload.
08:19
The gunmen escape Cathedral Square in the three cars. Toska is in the Ford. In the confusion, the Range Rover collides with the Saab and breaks the bumper, which hampers their escape. On board, Halimi receives a bullet to the head.
Approx. 08:25
The getaway cars stop near the car exchange site in Sørmarka, north-west of Stavanger.
08:30
The three getaway cars are set on fire. The gunmen escape in waiting cars.

== Investigation ==
Police charged 13 people in connection with the robbery. On 12 April 2005, David Toska confessed to having participated in the robbery, but denied shooting Klungland. David Toska, considered the ring leader, is also charged with the robbery of the Union Bank at Bryn, Oslo, and the robbery of the Post mail centre, in 2003. Johnny Thendrup (40) admitted to being the robber shot during the robbery.

Kjell Alrich Schumann admitted two years later that he had fired the shot that killed officer Klungland. Police found DNA on the towels and mattresses used to burn the lorry outside the police station. Ironically, in an attempt to kill two birds with one stone (to delay the police and to destroy vital evidence) the perpetrators delivered proof of their involvement to the front door of the police station.

Officer Erik Haaland was submitted to internal investigation to ascertain whether he was right to shoot first. It concluded he was.

== Trial ==
The 13 men involved in the NOKAS robbery were convicted and sentenced to a total of 181 years in prison on 10 March 2006. David Toska was given the longest sentence, with 21 years in jail. On 19 January 2007, the Court of Appeal confirmed the verdict for 12 of the 13 men. The thirteenth, Thomas Thendrup, was acquitted by the jury. However, Norwegian appeal law allows the presiding judges to overturn the jury's decision. Hence, the three judges overturned the jury's acquittal and ordered a retrial, causing huge controversy and public debate on the current justice system in Norway. Thendrup was convicted and sentenced to 14 years on 13 September 2007.

On 29 June 2007, the Norwegian Supreme Court added a cumulated 27 years in prison.

Ikmet Kodzadziku, claims his innocence for the robbery. He admits that he was in Stavanger but that he was closing a drug deal at the time of the heist. In the media, he stated that he "got the right sentence, but for the wrong crime."

The case is assumed to have cost the Norwegian state 160 million NOK.

In the 10 years from 1994 to 2004, Norwegian police fired some 79 shots; 48 of these were fired during the NOKAS robbery in 2004.

== Perpetrators ==
Of the 13 defendants, 12 were found guilty of the crime in January 2007. Thomas Thendrup was found guilty in September the same year.

- David Toska
- Kjell Alrich Schumann (1966–2025)
- Erling Havnå
- Metkel Betew (1978–2025)
- Ridvan Halimi
- Ikmet Kodzadziku
- Lars-Erik Andersen
- Alf Henrik Christensen
- Dan Pettersen
- Johnny Thendrup
- Thomas Oscar Ingebrigtsen
- William Pettersen
- Thomas Thendrup

== Film ==
In 2010, film director Erik Skjoldbjærg released a film on the NOKAS robbery.

The film shows a very confused situation where the police engage in a firefight with the gunmen before having the square locked down, while civilians freely wander around the square and buses are still circulating between the police and the gunmen.

== See also ==
- Västberga helicopter robbery
