= David Toska =

Norwegian bank robber

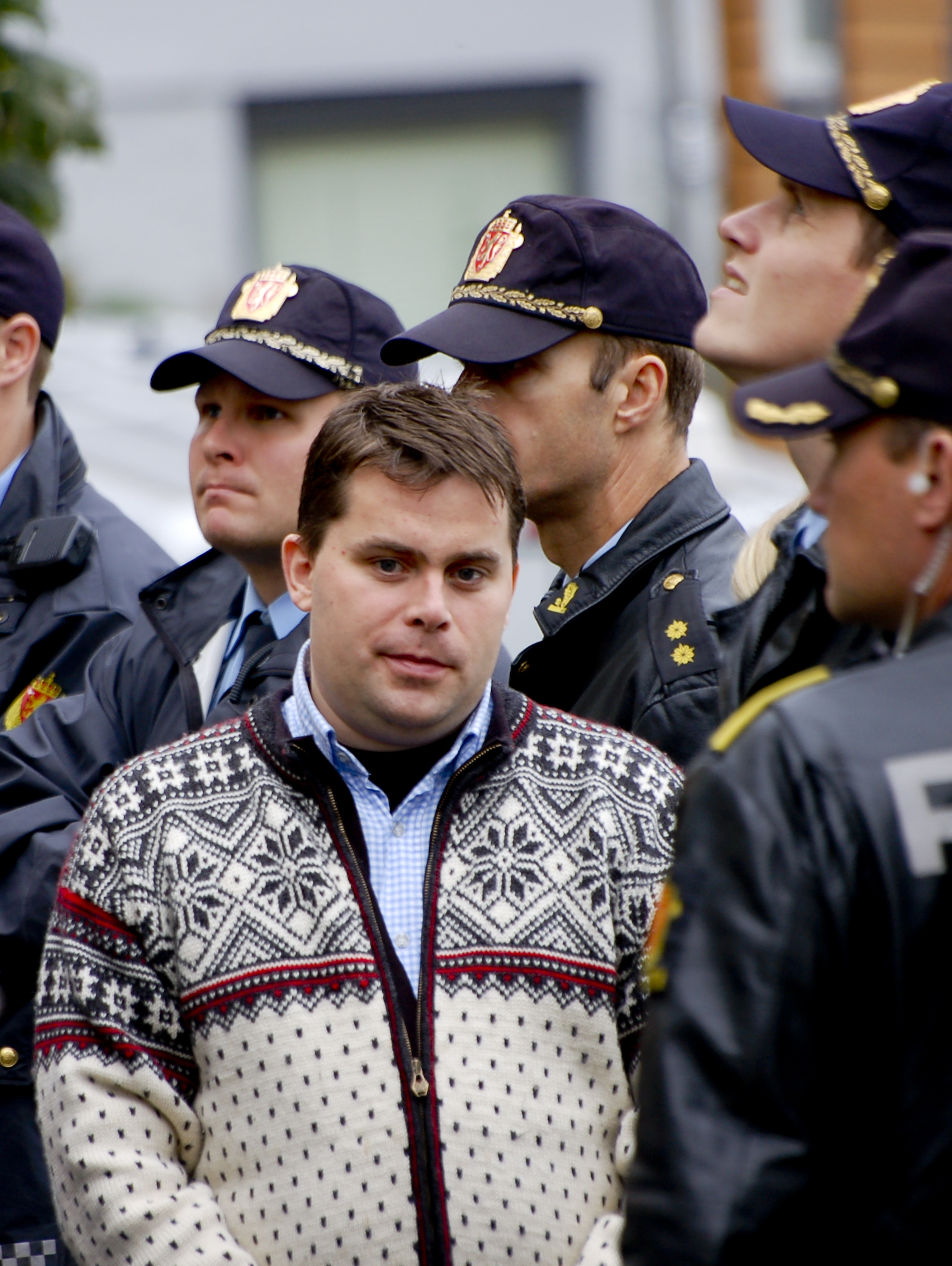
- Born: David Aleksander Toska; 18 September 1975 (age 50); Bergen, Norway
- Known for: "The mastermind" behind the NOKAS robbery

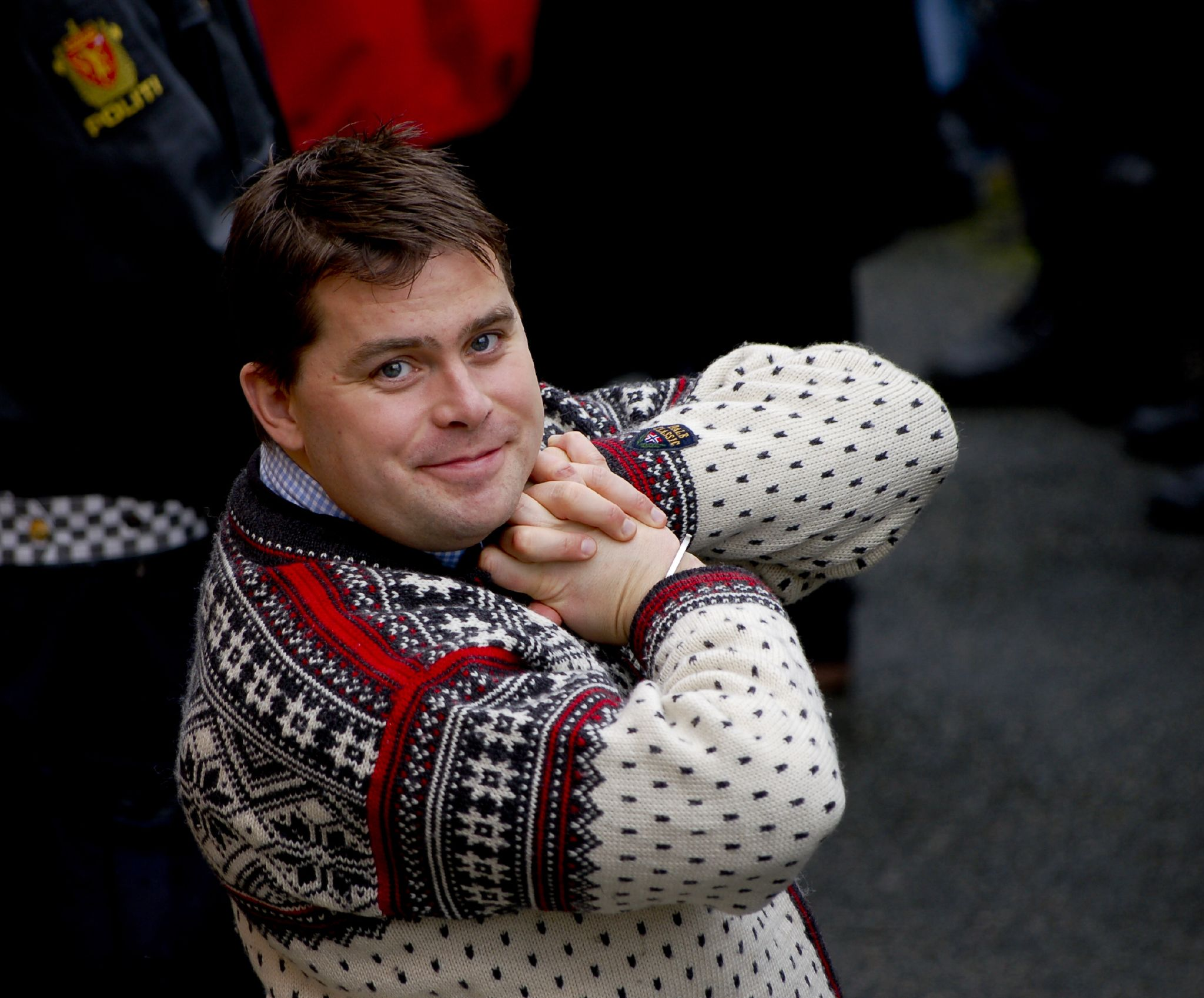
David Toska

David Aleksander Toska (born 18 September 1975) is the alleged mastermind behind the NOKAS robbery in Stavanger on 5 April 2004, one of the most profiled criminal cases in modern Norwegian history. The robbery resulted in the killing of a police officer, a very rare occurrence in Norway.

Toska was born in Bergen and moved to Oslo in 1985. He attended school at Ullevål and then Bjølsen. His criminal career began before he turned twenty, as he was arrested for a robbery in Ullevål where a car was driven into a shop window. In 1996 he was arrested for carrying a loaded weapon in a bar in Oslo. Police searched his home, where they found an MP5 sub-machine gun, explosives and tools for committing robberies. He is considered the mastermind behind the break-in at Norsk Medisinaldepot 19 November 2000, the safe-deposit box robbery at Bryn 1 October 2001, the commando-style robbery of Postens brevsentral 27 October 2003 and the NOKAS robbery 5 April 2004.

He admitted his involvement in the deposit robbery at Bryn and the Medicinal Depot, was committed, but later acquitted because of questionable motives and plausible coercion by the police. Emptying the bank boxes in 2001 brought out about NOK 20 million in values. A security employee, by the order of the police, fed Toska information, and so the police were said to have made possible and facilitate both robberies.

The robbery of NOKAS is arguably Norway's most famous robbery. The robbers killed a police officer and got away with approximately NOK 56 million. Following the robbery the police started the most extensive investigation in modern times and focused all their forces on unraveling a snarl of suspected syndicate crime. Toska was arrested in Málaga, Spain on 5 April 2005. In the NOKAS-trial against Toska he and his accomplices confessed to participation in the robbery, but not to the killing. On 5 March 2006, Toska was sentenced to 19 years in prison. In August 2017, Toska was allowed to serve his prison time at home in Bergen.

Toska was involved in discussions with police for the return of the paintings The Scream and Madonna, which had been stolen from Oslo's Munch Museum on Sunday, 22 August 2004. Oslo police refuse to say how they were able to recover the paintings.

In September 2024, he is scheduled to start as [CEO] (daglig leder) in Wayback (a Norwegian foundation).

== Other sources ==
- Mulkerrins, Jane. £5m heist: Why US and why here? Times Online. 1 September 2004.
- NOKAS verdicts fall. Aftenposten. 10 Mar 2006.
- Presseekspert om TV 2s Toska-valg: – Smakløst (in Norwegian) VG January 17, 2022.
- Bank robber joins chess broadcast chess24.com January 17, 2022.
