= Baneheia murders =

2000 double child murder in Norway

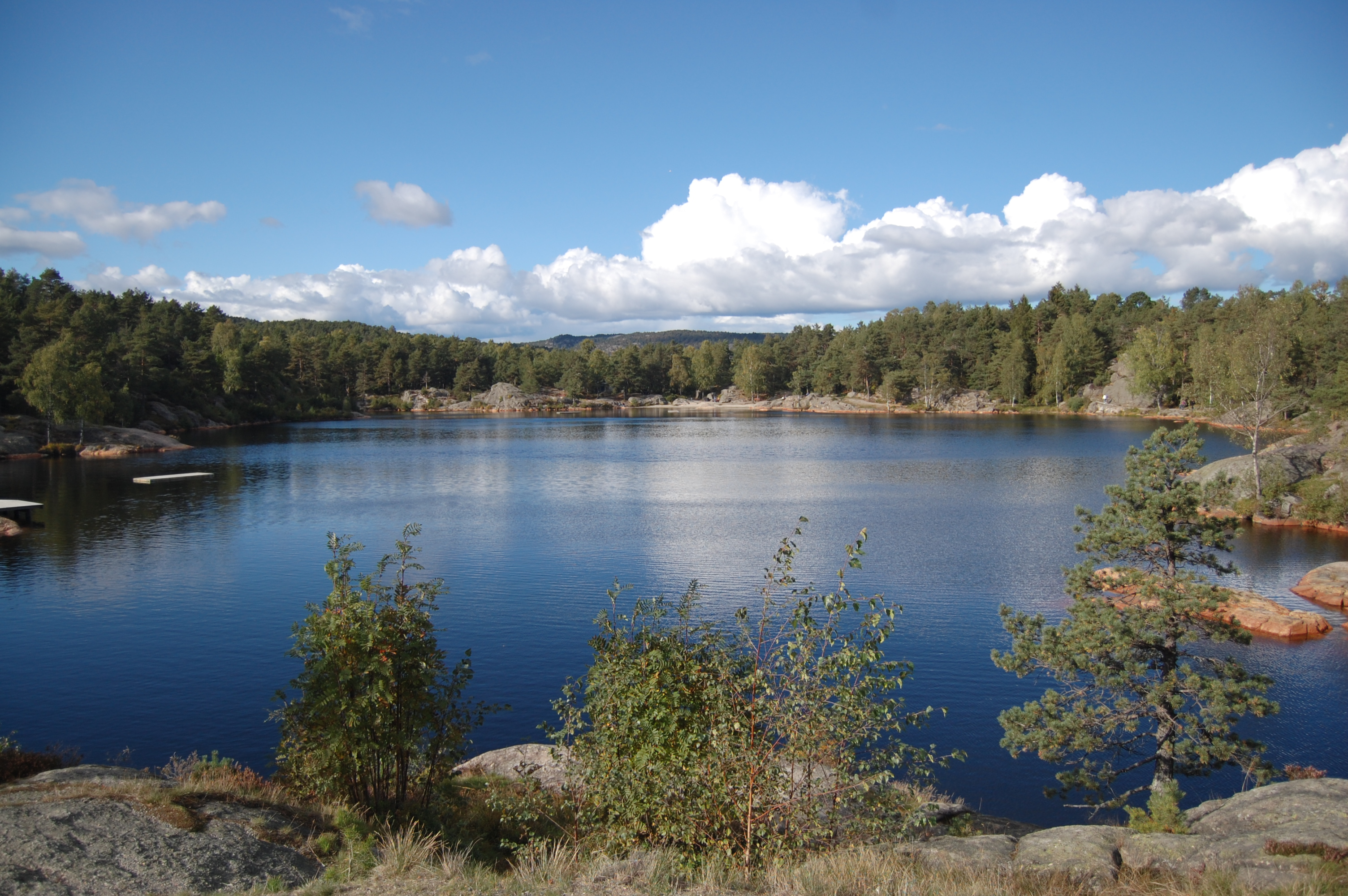
- Date: 19 May 2000
- Location: Baneheia, Kristiansand, Norway; 58°09′04″N 7°59′03″E
- Deaths: Lena Sløgedal Paulsen (10); Stine Sofie Austegard Sørstrønen (8)
- Convicted: Jan Helge Andersen
- Convictions: Murder, rape
- Sentence: 19 years

The Baneheia murders (Norwegian: Baneheia-drapene) was a double rape and murder, and a miscarriage of justice, that occurred in Norway on 19 May 2000. The victims were two girls, 10-year-old Lena Sløgedal Paulsen and 8-year-old Stine Sofie Austegard Sørstrønen. They were found raped and killed in the Baneheia area in Kristiansand. The murders received massive media attention in Norway in the early 2000s.

Two men were convicted (in 2001) for the murders: Jan Helge Andersen (born 1981) and Viggo Kristiansen (born 1979). Andersen was convicted of the murder and rape of Sørstrønen, but acquitted of the murder of Paulsen. The conviction of Andersen was based on a DNA match from the scene and a confession to the killing of Sørstrønen. Kristiansen was convicted of rape and murder of both girls and sentenced to 21 years of containment in 2001 and 2002.

While Andersen confessed to killing one of the girls, Kristiansen always claimed he was innocent. In the decades following the initial trials, Kristiansen applied for a retrial many times. His seventh application in 2021 was successful. In February 2021 Kristiansen's case was reopened and he was released from prison.

On 21 October 2022, Attorney General Jørn Maurud announced that the prosecution would submit a request for the acquittal of Viggo Kristiansen in the reopening case, based on the new investigation carried out by the Oslo police district. On 15 December 2022, Kristiansen was acquitted in the Borgarting Court of Appeal. The verdict against Kristiansen is widely considered as one of the biggest miscarriages of justice in Norway's recent history.

== The events of 19 May ==
On 19 May 2000, the day of the murders, Stine-Sofie Sørstrønen and Lena Sløgedal Paulsen were visiting with their fathers, who both lived in the same block of flats close to the Baneheia forest. Sørstrønen was visiting from Grimstad and Sløgedal Paulsen from a different neighborhood in Kristiansand. In the evening, they were going swimming together at a small lake called "Stampe 3." in the popular recreation area of Baneheia, which was not very far. They left home at approximately between 18:15 and 18:20. Two college students who also happened to be swimming at the same time as the girls, testified that the girls were still swimming in the water when they left at approximately 18:50.

== Search ==
When the two girls had not returned home by 23:00, the parents reported them missing, and a major search operation was launched. Immediately, police together with canine units began searching the area. By the next morning, over 50 volunteers from the Norwegian Red Cross were participating in the search. This number soon swelled to the hundreds, as Sea King and special police helicopters were called in along with rescue divers and civilian divers who trawled the lakes and ponds in the area. Volunteer mountaineers also climbed the steep cliffs bordering Baneheia, while the fire department surveyed the shorelines. In the night of 20 May, 16 electronic listening posts were set up around the terrain, which could detect extremely low volume noise during the night. This was done in case the girls were lying injured somewhere in the hills, in which case even the most faint crying or sulking would have been easily detected.

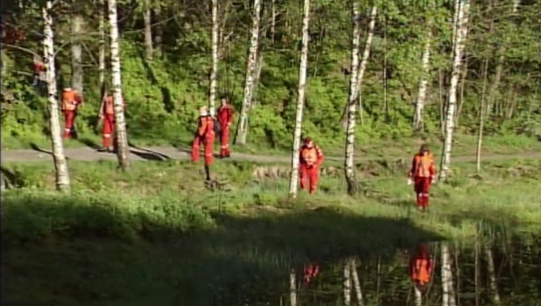
Search-and-rescue teams combing the area

Two days after the disappearance, the police expanded the search to include all of the woodlands and lakes adjacent to Kristiansand, collectively known as "Bymarka". Authorities also mobilized the military in the efforts to locate the missing children, with hundreds of troops from the home guard joining in, canvassing gardens, garages, boats, sheds, hedges and kindergartens. Helicopters applied heat-seeking cameras, all tunnels in connection with road construction in Baneheia were scanned, and all buses, ferries, trains and taxis were checked by armed police, but gave no clue as to the whereabouts of the girls.

Two days after the disappearance, police announced the discovery of a human skeleton near the river Otra, near Eg Hospital, but quickly decided that it was most likely a missing German tourist, unrelated to the case. It was later found, however that the body belonged to a German psychiatric patient who had escaped from the nearby psychiatric hospital years before. Later that same afternoon at around 17:03, the police discovered bloodied clothes hidden under a layer of mosses. The find was approximately 50 meters west of the lake known as "2. Stampe". The police, together with military personnel from the Home Guard, immediately moved in to cordon off the area. Later that evening, at approximately 20:37, Police announced the confirmation that both girls had been found murdered at that site. Upon receiving the news, the reaction among the hundreds of search-and-rescue personnel on site was one of enormous grief, many breaking down and weeping inconsolably, others walking around in a state of shock.

The bodies of the two little girls were found hidden under pine branches in a small slab rock crack a few dozen meters west of the pond, which is one of several ponds that constitutes a much frequented bathing area for the populace in Kristiansand. Traces of blood were also found across the scene along with the girls' clothes and shoes. They had been sexually assaulted, tied-up, strangled and stabbed to death.

== Investigation ==
=== Early investigation ===
After the discovery of the bodies, the police opened a murder investigation. Despite having received about 150 tips in the case, they were practically without leads. Kristiansand Police however stated that they were "optimistic and confident that this case, we will be able to resolve fairly quickly". Prime Minister Jens Stoltenberg and Minister of Justice Hanne Harlem both stated that everything would be done to get the murders solved.

On a normal Friday night there tended to be around 200 people jogging and strolling around in Baneheia. On the night of the crime, approximately 100 people were either jogging or walking through the area. A fixed abode for recreational drug users that for years had been colloquially referred to as "acid peak" was only 200 meters from the place where the two little girls were found murdered. Police interviewed large numbers of individuals known to frequent the area in order to learn of any possible witnesses. The area was also formerly known as a place where exhibitionists and voyeurs have operated.

Dagbladet's front page reads: "Unbelievable, what sick satan could have done this?"

Other possible suspects that were questioned by police included former sex-offenders, local convicted rapists, convicted murderers and even two psychiatric patients who had escaped from a psychiatric institution adjacent to the area. Similar crimes, such as the murder of a 13-year-old girl in Sweden were matched along with the brutal rape of two young girls in Oslo in the case of an eventual serial-offender. Even cases of child-murders in England were re-examined. Friends of the victims told police investigators that the two girls had previously experienced a mysterious man following them during a swimming trip. Police initially theorized that the same man was the murderer.

The acting chief of the Criminal Investigation Service (Kripos) Håkon Skulstad stated that worst-case scenario was a travelling perpetrator who was just passing through the area, just as Norway had experienced many years earlier in the case of Thomas Quick However professor and leading forensic psychiatrist Berthold Grünfeld stated that this was unlikely. According to him, the murderer was most likely a man, in his 30s and without prior criminal record. This was echoed by expert forensic psychiatrist Kjell Noreik who added that the perpetrator most likely was without any serious mental illness, and was "aware of his actions".

In May 2000, the local police said their main theory was that they were most likely facing two perpetrators, who had meticulously planned the murders in advance, due to the difficulties a single perpetrator would face in controlling both girls. As he attacked one, the other would have an opportunity to escape. In Baneheia, people are always close by, and there are plenty of hiding places among the pine thickets and rocks. The odds were good that a lone assailant would fail. In June that same year, Kripos composed a profile for the killer, and their theory was that it only was one perpetrator. The police were also searching for five unidentified people who behaved suspiciously near Baneheia.

=== Arrests ===
During the early investigation, the local police wanted to arrest both Andersen and Kristiansen, but they were stopped by Kripos (who had come to assist the local police). The reason for stopping the arrests was that there were no evidence on either Andersen or Kristiansen at that time. But when checking the DNA found on the crime scene, there was a match on Andersen. On September 13, after keeping him under surveillance for 48-hours, they arrested 19-year-old Andersen and charged him with the double murder. According to police, Andersen's DNA was a perfect match with pubic hairs found on the scene. He had no criminal record. Kristiansen was arrested at the same time as Andersen although they still didn't have any evidence on Kristiansen.

Upon his arrest, Andersen initially denied having anything to do with the murders, even when confronted with DNA evidence. Moments later, when lead interrogator Geir Hansen suggested that Andersen himself could be a victim in the case, and that Kristiansen could have been the most active participant, Andersen admitted that he murdered one of the girls. He also named 21-year-old Kristiansen as murderer of the other girl. The two suspects were close friends and had been seen by witnesses in Baneheia on the day of the murders.

Andersen explained that the two men had plotted to commit rape and murder in detail for some time, and had bicycled around in Baneheia on the day of the murder looking for random victims when they spotted the two girls swimming. After luring the girls into the woods by claiming to have kittens, Andersen said that he acted as lookout while Kristiansen raped the two girls, and that he was forced to kill Sløgedal Paulsen after fearing she would scream. Kristiansen then stabbed Sørstrønen to death when she tried to escape. He said Kristiansen was the dominant one, and that it was he who gave the orders, which he felt compelled to follow, as he was intimidated by Kristiansen. According to Andersen, Kristiansen threatened to kill him and as well as the girls if he did not comply. Kristiansen however, vehemently denied having anything to do with the murders. Both men were subject to evaluation by court appointed psychiatrists, and both men were subsequently declared to be legally sane and fit to stand trial.

On 28 September, Kristiansen was evacuated to a prison outside the city after an internet-organized vigilante mob started gathering on the street outside the courthouse. On the same day, the Kristiansand Police Commissioner Ansten Klev, publicly appealed for people to remain calm throughout the city.

== Trial ==
On 23 April 2001 the trial against Andersen and Kristiansen began. By order of Prosecutor-General Tor-Aksel Busch, both men were charged with identical crimes of rape and premeditated murder. In addition, and unrelated to the murders, Kristiansen was charged with rape and sexual abuse against a girl under the age of 10, indecent assault against a boy under the age of 10, and for looking at a woman through her window while she was getting undressed. Kristiansen confessed (in full tears) that he had sexually abused the girl five times when he was between 15 and 17 years old. Kristiansen also confessed to the charges of the woman, but not for the charges of the boy. Kristiansen pleaded not guilty to the charge of two counts of premeditated murder and rape. Andersen pleaded guilty to one count of rape and one count of 2nd-degree murder. The court heard 49 witnesses, 30 for the prosecution and 19 for the two defendants.

During her testimony, Kristiansen's mother described his childhood as one with a lot of tantrums and rage. In elementary school he would frequently get into fights, as well as having verbal outbursts with his teachers. The mother said his hot temper made him a target for the older children to pick on, and during the eight grade he had had enough. He would leave home for school in the morning like usual, but it turned out later that he had not been in school for half a year. He dropped out of school altogether in the ninth grade, and was since then involved with child psychiatric services.

During the trial, prosecutor Edward Dahl painted Kristiansen as an extremely violent psychopath who was obsessed with pornography and rape. Two forensic psychiatrists testifying for the prosecution noted that he was intellectually "quite simple" and was unable to grasp basic terms and expressions. Furthermore, they described Kristiansen as "chaotic" and with an "immature sexuality". They further concluded that he did not have any serious mental disorder, but rather had emotionally unstable personality disorder. "We would no doubt regard him as having insufficiently developed mental faculties if he was found guilty". A 40-year old neighbour, who also worked as a community worker, described Viggo Kristiansen as a "ticking time-bomb" during his testimony. He based this on his "gut feeling" as well as his alleged previous experience with "bullies" and "punks". The prosecutor also cast serious doubts on the veracity of Andersen's version of events. Amongst other things, Andersen had no explanation for why the girls were wearing each other's clothes when they were found.

Furthermore, Andersen had changed his story several times during interrogation, and only when confronted with evidence had he admitted to molesting the girls, as well as covering the bodies with pine branches. He never showed any signs of remorse, seeing himself as another victim of his co-defendant. Court psychiatrists noted his striking tendency to blame every aspect of the crime on Kristiansen, but could not agree on a definite diagnosis. In the end, it was Andersen's statement which was the main pillar in the verdict against Kristiansen.

=== Verdict ===
Kristiansen was found guilty on all counts and sentenced to 21 years imprisonment (containment, equivalent to a life-sentence). Andersen was found guilty of one count of murder and rape, and sentenced to 19 years in prison According to the verdict, Viggo Kristiansen was the leading force behind the crime. The court established that Kristiansen and Andersen both had "subnormal" IQ of 83 and 84 respectively, that Kristiansen "is to be considered dangerous", has "paedophile tendencies", "small or no possibility of improvement" and that it is "a reasonable danger that he might again commit violent acts and sexual abuse". The court-appointed psychiatrists concluded that Kristiansen had a "severe personality disorder [..] most likely borderline personality disorder".

The presiding judge Asbjørn Nes Hansen wrote in his sentencing:

"Each of the victims has been subjected to the extreme burden of having been forced to listen to the other being raped while moaning in pain. Lena must have had thoughts about what would happen to her while Stine Sofie was being raped. After Lena was killed, Stine Sofie must have heard the defendants quarreling about who was going to kill her. Jan Helge Andersen explained that Stine Sofie took Lena's arm and later peered onto her. She probably understood at that time that Lena was dead. As the District Court has referred in its judgment, it is not possible to comprehend the fear and the suffering that the two girls went through before they finally died."

News channel Tv2 reported Kristiansen's emotional affect inside the courtroom lmmediately after the sentencing was read as one of wearing a grin on his face while chewing gum. They later aired the video-tape during the evening news, after Kristiansen's lawyer told the media that Kristiansen had been "absolutely devastated" by the verdict. In a 2008 interview, Kristiansen explained his reaction, saying that he was smiling at the mere "absurdity of the situation", he also accused the media of using the clip to portray him as a "cold-blooded monster. without emotions". This incident sparked a long legal conflict between Tv2 and the court, due to a law banning recording of defendants inside court-rooms. Tv2 was eventually cleared of any wrongdoing.

Kristiansen was not given an ordinary prison sentence, but rather sentenced to containment (the Norwegian legal term is forvaring), a form of special protective custody which means he may be held in prison indefinitely and is subject to release only at the discretion of a judge after his sentence is served. Containment is roughly comparable to a life sentence in many other European countries. Kristiansen was serving his sentence at Ila Prison, while Andersen was serving his sentence at Telemark Prison in Skien up until 2012, when he was transferred to a minimum security prison, in order to better prepare him for his eventual release on parole, possible from April 2013. Andersen was released January 2015. He has since settled in the city of Tønsberg.

==== The murders according to the verdict from 2001 ====
On their way home from the lake, the girls ran into the two assailants, Kristiansen and Andersen, who had been bicycling around the area looking for potential victims. They were lured by Kristiansen, who pretended to be looking for lost kittens, up to a more secluded part of the terrain. At the trial, the court established that both girls were at this point first ordered to undress, then sexually assaulted by Kristiansen. Andersen contributed to this act by subduing the girls, as well as later sexually molesting Sørstrønen. After Kristiansen had raped Sløgedal Paulsen, he killed her by stabbing her three times, once in the abdomen/chest and two times in the neck, severing her right carotid artery.

After briefly arguing over who was going to kill the remaining child, Andersen proceeded to stab Sørstrønen once in the neck, also severing her carotid artery, while Kristiansen was holding her arms and legs. The two men then covered the bodies with vegetation, and stuffed their bodies between the slab rocks before hiding the girls' blood-soaked swimsuits in a nearby muddy drainage pipe. After walking back towards the neighborhood of Eg, where they lived, the two men planned a fictitious alibi for the time of the murders. Kristiansen was to say he was in his workshop, while Andersen was to say he was jogging. Later in the day, the two met up at Kristiansen's house, where they called up two other friends, in an attempt to bolster their alibi.

== Reopening of the case against Kristiansen ==
In the spring of 2010, DNA samples which Bente Mevåg claimed were not in the possession of the Rettsmedisinsk Institutt, were located in a freezer at that institution. One hundred ninety-nine samples were found. The samples were tested and the analysis gave no indication that the victims had been killed by two persons.

In February 2021, after Kristiansen had previously unsuccessfully applied for a reopening six times (including two appeals), Gjenopptakelseskommisjonen voted in favour of reopening his case. The decision was split 3–2 with the chairperson of the commission, Siv Hallgren dissenting.

In February 2021, the case was transferred to the jurisdiction of Oslo's Office of the Public Prosecutor; the office sent the case to Oslo Police District, for investigation.

Kristiansen's attorney subsequently requested for his client to be released from prison after learning about the decision from the Criminal Cases Review Commission. Kristiansen had until then refused to apply for parole as he considered this to be a recognition of his sentence. Both the prison authority and the court of appeals denied his request, the latter in a split 2-1 decision. Kristiansen's attorneys again appealed the decision to the Supreme Court of Norway. A month later, before the Supreme Court could hear the case, the state prosecutor responsible for the case decided to drop his objections to Kristiansen's release. The next day, on 1 June, the Supreme Court unanimously decided to release Kristiansen from prison. He left the prison around 23:00 later that same evening.

== Apologies from government employees ==
Riksadvokat Jørn Sigurd Maurud, representing the top level of prosecuting authority in Norway, apologized on 21 October 2022: "I am sorry for the injustice that has been done"; the apology unleashed apologies from the Director of Police, from Kripos, from the Office of the public prosecutor of Agder, and from Agder Police District which investigated the case.

In an October 2022 reaction to the development of the case, the minister of justice ordered a full fact-finding on all institutions that have handled the case; she added that the ministry of justice is now creating a mandate for the fact-finding.

== Controversies ==
Following the verdict (in 2001), Kristiansen and his supporters have raised several issues concerning the evidence for the verdict. The main issues are related to the interrogating techniques performed on Andersen, the location of Kristiansen's cell phone during the time of the murders, Kristiansen's alibi as per witnesses, whether there were two perpetrators or one, and the validity of the DNA evidence.

=== Interrogation of Andersen ===
During the initial interrogation of Andersen, the police applied controversial suggestive question techniques. The lead interrogator, without any formal training, proceeded with so-called "informal conversations" with Andersen while waiting for his attorney to arrive. During this time, the interrogator informed Andersen that the police "knew" there was more than one perpetrator. He also introduced Andersen to the idea that Kristiansen was a participant and even the leading force of the crime. The interrogator wrote the following in the police report:

I explained for Andersen that the police now knew he was one of the perpetrators. I also told Andersen about the advantages he would get by explaining everything. (...) I asked Andersen if he himself could be a victim in some sense since his best buddy Viggo Kristiansen could have been the most active participant. When I said this, it was obvious that Andersen got something to think about. We talked a little bit back and forth about the relationship between Andersen and Kristiansen, and there was no doubt that Kristiansen was the strong one, the one in charge.

Gregg McCrary from the FBI testified in court in 2011 and said the following about this interrogation: "It's a very alarming way to interrogate a witness. The police must never give the name of possible perpetrators or ask leading questions". McCrary also said that it seemed obvious that Andersen had been guided since the details changed from interrogation to interrogation. Gísli Guðjónsson, Professor of Forensic Psychology at King's College London who is also an expert on suggestibility and false confessions, wrote in his report that the initial police interrogator "most likely ruined the case".

=== Telecommunication alibi ===
Three times around the time of the murders, at 19:24, 19.37, and 20:20 Kristiansen's cell phone was used. Reports from Telenor and Teleplan showed that his phone had connected to a particular cell site, "Eg_A", which normally would not cover the murder location. According to both reports, technicians were unable to replicate this situation. Both reports concluded, however, that they could not completely dismiss that it was possible.

=== Witness alibis ===
Kristiansen's mother testified during the trial that she saw her son arriving and walking in the backyard on the evening of the murders, and that therefore he could not have been at the murder-site. This statement also matched the measurements in the telecommunication reports since the cell site connected to Kristiansen's phone was close to his home, a fact Kristiansen's mother couldn't have known about since the cell phone alibi wasn't discovered until the trial was almost over.

A Scandinavian airlines pilot who had some spare time in Kristiansand before his next flight saw a man together with two girls between 19:40 and 19:45 in Baneheia. The pilot only watched them from a distance, but he saw enough to describe the color of their clothes, which matched the color of the clothes of Andersen and the victims. Despite extensive public outreach for everyone who was in the area to contact the police, there were no other reports of a grown up person with two children. The pilot was not called to witness for the court.

The observation of the pilot skewed the time period of highest probability of the murders from between 19:00 and 20:00 to between 20:00 and 20:30. Observations made by five other witnesses who heard or saw relevant activity in the area indeed agree with the time of the murders being between 20:00 and 20:30. During this span of time, Viggo Kristiansen used his mobile phone not only to send and receive text messages, but also to calmly speak with a friend. None of these five witnesses were called to court as witnesses either.

=== Two perpetrators ===
A suspect profile report from the National Criminal Investigation Service in Norway (Kripos) suggested that there might be only one perpetrator since both victims were killed in a similar way. In the interrogations with the police, Andersen had described in detail how the girls were killed, a method he had learned by watching a special type of documentary called "Reality TV", but he was only sentenced for killing one of the victims while Kristiansen was sentenced for killing both. The suspect profile report was presented neither for the court nor for the lawyers, and was unknown by the public until 2010 when Kristiansen's lawyer Sigurd J. Klomsæt finally got hold of it by appearing personally at Kripos after several failed written requests. FBI expert Gregg McCrary agreed with the conclusion of the report.

In addition, the defence has pointed out the extreme rareness of two perpetrators in such a case. In fact there had never been a record of two adult perpetrators where children have been murdered, neither in Europe nor the United States, and an American survey from 2008 said that only 2% of all types of murder cases had more than one perpetrator.

=== DNA evidence presented in court ===
The court of the two trials had been informed that there existed two sets of DNA profiles from the crime area, one profile that matched Andersen, and another profile that matched 54% of the Norwegian male population, including Kristiansen. The criminal investigation chief in Kristansand, Arne Pedersen, said that the DNA material, with "100% certainty", tied Kristiansen to the murders after consulting with Bente Mevåg from the forensics institute. Kristiansen's lawyer, Tore H. Pettersen, tried to create doubt about whether the DNA evidence showed two perpetrators. He argued that the material could be polluted and that the evidence by itself was very uncertain, but got no positive response from Bente Mevåg when she was confronted with this in court. When Tore H. Pettersen in his closing statement argued that the DNA evidence was caused by contamination, members of the jury reportedly leaned backwards in their chairs, smiled, and crossed their arms comfortably. In the judge's direction to the jury, the judge said:

Tore H. Pettersen sowed doubt about whether there could have been two perpetrators at the scene (...). However, based on what the court-appointed experts have said we must expect that we have reliable biological evidence to conclude two perpetrators.

In 2010, three independent laboratories in Sweden, Norway, and England retested the original biological samples stored at Santiago de Compostela-institute in Spain and the Forensic institute in Norway, material that had been reported dispatched both by Bente Mevåg, and Arne Pedersen at the local police. All laboratories reported the same result. The samples had positive DNA-profile from Andersen, but no match from Kristiansen. The second DNA profile, the one in the original report that matched half the Norwegian population, was this time either not reported, or reported to be a contamination, and in addition so small that it would be illegal to present in court in other countries. Dr. Susan Pope from the Forensic Science Service (FSS) in London believed the prosecutors had received an erroneous translation of the report since the second match was presented as "incriminating evidence" in court, and the Santiago de Compostela institute in Spain had denied that their report described the second match as incriminating evidence. The Santiago de Compostela-institute had also reported tiny DNA traces from four different people, and not two people, as claimed by the Norwegian forensics institute, further raising the suspicion of pollution.

State prosecutor Jostein Johannesen wrote in 2010 that "it's unfortunate that the police presented this as incriminating evidence against Viggo Kristiansen". In a trial from 2011, Gregg McCrary from the FBI testified that the lack of DNA trace excluded Kristiansen even as a suspect. In the same trial, the director of FSS, Chris Hadkiss, said that the case would have been reopened in England, based on the DNA evidence alone. Susan Pope said the same.

In conjunction with an application to reopen the case in 2017, telecommunication engineer and scientist Harald Sivertsen analyzed the original report from the Santiago de Compostela-institute. Harald Sivertsen found that the report from Santiago de Compostela-institute was only meant to be a preliminary report. He also wrote that the report did not describe any certainty of two assailants, and he asked where the final report is, and what the final report says. This analysis was written in the form of a letter addressed to Bente Mevåg, but Bente Mevåg did not reply to the letter.

In June 2020, the Norwegian Criminal Cases Review Commission asked Frederik Torp Petersen, a Danish DNA expert with a PhD in biology who works for the forensics institute in Copenhagen, to consider the validity of the DNA evidence. His conclusion was that the DNA evidence was too weak to say anything about the number of assailants, and should not be presented in court.

=== Media portrayal ===
Kristiansen was consistently portrayed in the media as a cold-hearted psychopath. The local newspaper Fædrelandsvennen referred to him as "the Incarnation of Evil". But when Andersen in court described how Andersen had killed Sørstrønen, Kristiansen reportedly had tears in his eyes and took deep breaths, showing similar reactions as many others in the court audience. When Kristiansen gave his testimony in court about the underaged girl he had sexually abused 6–7 years earlier, he was crying so heavily that he was unable to speak, forcing the prosecutor to read out loud Kristiansen's written police testimony instead. Kristiansen also showed sympathy and understanding for the family members of the victims when they didn't want the trial to be re-opened. Andersen, on the other hand, never showed any emotions, not even when describing killing and rape in detail. When Andersen met the press the day after he got his final sentence of 19 years, he said that he rather wanted no sentence when asked how he felt about the sentence. Kristiansen said in the same interview, when asked the same question, that he felt sorry for his mother and his family about what they had to read about him in the papers.

=== Timeline after the initial trials ===
In 2004, Kristiansen started treatment with specialist in psychology Atle Austad. Kristiansen contacted Austad because he needed help to cope with the sexual abuse he had committed against an underage girl when he was a teenager. Austad initially assumed that Kristiansen was guilty of the Baneheia case as well, but later realized, after doing some research, that he had to be innocent. After this, Austad recommended Kristiansen to find a new lawyer, and recommended Sigurd Klomsæt.

In 2008, Kristiansen filed a motion to re-open his case. Kristiansen had also replaced his old lawyer Tore H. Pettersen with Sigurd Klomsæt.

In 2009, Sigurd Klomsæt sued the Criminal investigation chief in Kristansand, Arne Pedersen, since both the police in Kristiansand and a middle manager from the forensics institute, Bente Mevåg, had informed him that the DNA material had been destroyed. The case was dismissed by the special unit for police cases.

In 2010, while Bente Mevåg was on sick leave, the DNA material turned up. Eivind Pedersen, a journalist from Dagbladet, didn't believe the DNA material had been destroyed as Mevåg had said and contacted acting middle manager Margurethe Stenersen and institute leader Ole Gunnar Ballo while Bente Mevåg was on sick leave. The pertinent DNA material was located exactly where it was supposed to be, stored in 199 test tubes in a freezer. Margurethe Stenersen also gave assurances that they never throw DNA material away ("Why would we?"). Despite immediate political pressure to investigate the institute after this occurrence, the result was that Ballo, even though he was not in charge when Mevåg disinformed Klomsæt, decided to resign because of "work pressure" just two weeks later and only 9 months after being hired. Mevåg continued in her job and the institute was not investigated.

In 2010, the motion to re-open the case was denied by the authorities, stating that the case was not sufficient for re-opening.

In 2011, Kristiansen appealed to the European Court of Human Rights in Strasbourg. That same year Kristiansen sued the Norwegian Criminal Cases Review Commission for not granting a retrial. He lost the case. Kristiansen's lawyers described the verdict as an uncritical cheering of the Norwegian Criminal Cases Review Commission. In 2012, Kristiansen appealed this to the Supreme Court of Norway. His lawyers hoped that he would be granted a new trial since they now possessed additional case evidence which was not considered during the first court proceedings. Viggo Kristiansen argued that new evidence would acquit him. On March 27 the supreme court rejected his appeal.

In 2012, Sigurd Klomsæt lost his license to practice law. Klomsæt was sentenced for distributing pictures of Anders Behring Breivik to the press in conjunction with his work as lawyer for one of the victims. Klomsæt said that "strong forces" had leaked the pictures as a way to get rid of him because of his involvement in the Baneheia case, the Birgitte case, the Bjugn affair, and other cases where he had been bothersome for police and prosecutors. When Klomsæt lost his license, Arvid Sjødin took over as Kristiansen's main lawyer. Klomsæt got his license back in 2014.

In 2014, Viggo Kristiansen sued Jan Helge Andersen for slandering him. The case was dismissed; the police's justification for the dismissal was that it was "obviously baseless". Arvid Sjødin also notified the director of Public Prosecutions of Norway, Tor-Aksel Busch, about several criminal offenses performed by the police and the local state prosecutor during the investigation. In his reply, Tor-Aksel Busch did not address the accusations and only wrote "It should be obvious, but just to clarify: Viggo Kristiansen was found guilty in 2002 and all his applications for retrial have been rejected."

In 2014, Kristiansen's prison psychologist for 10 years, Atle Austad, said publicly that he thought Viggo Kristiansen was innocent of the crimes, and that this could be proven. For this statement, complaints about malpractice, breach of confidentiality, and other charges, were sent to The Norwegian Psychological Association (NPF) and to the Oslo county. All complaints were sent by the mother of Sørstrønen. Austad later said that he was generally described as a controversial person after this statement; he also received death threats, and was no longer hired by the Norwegian Civil Affairs Authority.

In 2015, Jan Helge Andersen was released from prison. He gave the following statement: "I've been in prison for 14 years, that's a long time. I've paid for what I've done." His parole ended in 2019.

In 2015, Atle Austad was cleared of any wrongdoing, both by The Norwegian Psychological Association (NPF) and by the Oslo county. For the complaints about breach of confidentiality, NPF stated that psychologists are required to report cases of miscarriage of justice, even when it breaks confidentiality.

In 2016, Arvid Sjødin, Kristansen's lawyer, sent a request for new trial based on a new law called "objektivitetsplikten" (objectivity duty). The new objectivity duty law was created by the government due to several cases of miscarriage of justice in Norway, and says: "if it appears clear for the prosecutor that there is insufficient proof for conviction, the prosecutor must drop charges or request the accused to be acquitted."

In 2017, the state attorney rejected the request for a new trial. Arvid Sjødin thought the decision was incomprehensible since "the state attorney now seems to consider himself having more knowledge about cell phones than the experts".

In 2017, Bjørn Olav Jahr wrote a book about the Baneheia case called "Drapene i Baneheia. To historier. En sannhet" ("The Baneheia murders. Two stories. One truth"). Jahr is an experienced journalist and author of several books about real crimes. Jahr concluded that Viggo Kristiansen was innocent and that Jan Helge Andersen was the only perpetrator. The book also sparked a lot of public discussion about the case, including several articles and public statements from people expressing doubt about the sentence, and people believing that Kristiansen is innocent.

In 2018, a police expert on telecommunication wrote a note to The Norwegian Criminal Cases Review Commission to confirm that Viggo Kristiansen's mobile phone gives him an alibi.

In 2019, it was revealed that Kristiansen's missing blue mora knife had been in the possession of the police all the time and had even been checked out of the case as not being the murder weapon. The knife was believed to be missing, and it was also presented for the general public as the murder weapon. In court, Viggo Kristiansen was asked about the knife. The prosecutor asked where the knife was and if he could explain why the knife was missing. In reality, a neighbour of Kristiansen had earlier found the knife on the ground and given it to the police.

In 2019 and 2020, TV2, the second largest TV channel in Norway, released a podcast series about the Baneheia case. The podcast claimed to take a neutral stance but was still accused of being biased in support of Viggo Kristiansen by the families of the victims.

In March 2020, Arne Pedersen wrote a public article defending the work of the police. Pedersen also accused the media of being biased in support of Viggo Kristiansen, creating public disbelief. Avid Sjødin, in his reply, claimed many of the statements in the article to be incorrect, but he agreed that the media was being biased, although against, not in support of, Viggo Kristiansen.

In June 2020, The Norwegian Criminal Cases Review Commission asked Frederik Torp Petersen, a Danish DNA expert with a PhD in biology who works for the forensics institute in Copenhagen, to consider the validity of the DNA evidence. His conclusion was that the DNA evidence was too weak to say anything about the number of assailants, and should not be presented for a court. This was the first expert consideration of the DNA evidence after the original trials that had not been assigned by Viggo Kristiansen's defense team, which was the objection raised by the Agder state prosecutor against the earlier reports. However the conclusion of this report was the same as the ones assigned by Viggo Kristiansen's defense team.

In August 2020, the Norwegian Civil Affairs Authority, a state organisation that controls judicial expert reports, decided that the report from Frederik Torp Petersen should be taken out of the case since "it was not within the mandate", and "it was not within the field of the author", to say anything about whether the DNA evidence should be presented for a court. Doing so would create "uncertainty". The short answer from the Danish DNA expert was: "I maintain the original wording of the report, and I disagree that it creates uncertainty."

In January 2021, TVNorge, a TV channel in the Discovery group, released a 6-part documentary about the Baneheia case. A significant part of the documentary focused on Kristiansen's family and their struggles after the conviction including their decades long fight to get Kristiansen acquitted. The documentary claimed to take a neutral stance but was still accused of being biased in support of Viggo Kristiansen by the families of the victims.

In January 2021, Dagsavisen, one of Norway's largest newspapers, wrote in its editorial that the case looked more and more like a miscarriage of justice, and demanded that the case should be reopened.

In February 2021, Civita, one of Norway's largest think tanks, released a podcast with the title "Is the Baneheia case the biggest miscarriage of justice in Norwegian history?", where the host took a clear stance and said the ruling was obviously wrong.

In February 2021 the Norwegian Correctional Service recommended to extend Kristiansen's sentence by four years arguing that there was a real and qualified risk of recurrence of the Baneheia crimes. In the process, Viggo Kristiansen had experienced that the correctional service wanted him to admit guilt in the Baneheia case, and therefore cut off all contact with them.

In February 2021, The Norwegian Criminal Cases Review Commission decided to reopen the case against Viggo Kristiansen. The main reason was new doubt created about the DNA evidence after the trials. The minor reason was new doubt created about the validity of the interrogation of Anderssen, mainly expressed in a report written by Gísli Guðjónsson. The Cases review commission did not consider the cell phone alibi as new evidence, arguing that the judges and the jury were well aware of the strength of the alibi already back then. In conjunction with the reopening, the case was also transferred from the Agder state prosecutor to the Oslo state prosecutor.

In February 2021, Viggo Kristiansen applied for his release from prison. Kristiansen had the opportunity to apply for release since 2011, but had until now refused to leave the prison unless he was acquitted. However, since the case had now been re-opened, he was sure he would be acquitted and therefore didn't see any reason to be in prison anymore.

In March 2021, the former director of the National Criminal Investigation Service (Kripos), Knut Holen, said that the evidence to convict Kristiansen did not measure up, and that he should not have been convicted.

In April 2021, the Borgarting Court of Appeal decided not to release Viggo Kristiansen from prison despite him having no current legally enforcable conviction. The court argued that he could be a danger for the society. Kristiansen's lawyer characterized the decision as yet another abuse against Kristiansen and announced that the decision would be appealed to the Supreme court.

In May 2021, the Oslo state prosecutor suddenly announced that they had changed their mind and now agreed that Viggo Kristiansen should be released from prison. On the next day, on 1 June 2021, the Supreme Court of Norway unanimously decided to release Viggo Kristiansen from prison, and on the evening, Kristiansen was a free man.

In June 2021, the police took new DNA samples from Viggo Kristiansen.

In October 2021, March 2022 and June 2022, Andersen was re-interrogated by Oslo police. His residence was searched by police several times.

On 21 October 2022, Attorney General Jørn Maurud announced that the prosecution would submit a request for the acquittal of Viggo Kristiansen in the reopening case, based on the new investigation carried out by the Oslo police district. On December 15, 2022, Kristiansen was acquitted of murder in the Borgarting Court of Appeal. On the child molestation and voyeurism charges, that Kristiansen had confessed to, he was sentenced to 10 months imprisonment, far less than the time already served.

== Legacy ==
The case traumatized Norwegian society and made headlines for several consecutive months. The crime created great anger in the Sørlandet district and across Norway, so much that one early suspect, a formerly convicted murderer, had to flee his home and sleep outside in a tent out of fear of vigilante violence. Other clients of Andersen's lawyer Ben Fegran threatened to cut all connection with him unless he stopped representing Andersen.

On the first anniversary for the murders, a huge outdoor memorial service was held in Sørstrønen's hometown of Grimstad. Artists including Bjørn Eidsvåg, a-ha, Ole Edvard Antonsen and Morten Harket celebrated the victims' lives from the stage at the granite quarry in Fjæreheia.

The mother of Sørstrønen, Ada Sofie Austegard founded Stine Sofie's Foundation, a charitable foundation that will fight to preserve the rights of children when they are exposed to violence and sex crimes, as well as work to increase the minimum penalty for child abuse. She has ever since been active in promoting laws to protect children on the national level.

Among others, legislation was sponsored guaranteeing children the right to a public attorney in cases where they are victims of violent or sexual crimes, as well as starting the first national helpline for children. Former Minister of Justice Knut Storberget called the murders "the decisive watershed moment in terms of turning the police effort against the violence that affects women and children".

== See also ==
- Crime in Norway
- Life imprisonment in Norway
- List of solved missing person cases (post-2000)
- Stine Sofie's Foundation
