= Tore Stenshagen =

Norwegian footballer (born 1965)

Personal information
- Date of birth: 11 December 1965 (age 60)
- Height: 1.90 m (6 ft 3 in)
- Position: Goalkeeper

Youth career
- –1983: Vålerenga

Senior career*
Years	Team	Apps	(Gls)
1984	Vålerenga		
1985–1986	Kjelsås		
- Lørenskog
1992–1998	Lyn	93	(0)
1993	→ Bærum (loan)		
1999	Kjelsås		
2006–2015	Kragerø		

Managerial career
- 2009: Kragerø
- 2011: Kragerø
- 2016: Kragerø/Helle (junior)
- * Club domestic league appearances and goals

Tore Stenshagen (born 11 December 1965) is a retired Norwegian football goalkeeper.

Hailing from Tveita, he played youth football for Vålerenga IF and was selected for Norway's youth national team. In 1984 he was drafted into the senior team. In 1985 he went on to Kjelsås IL. Afterwards he played for Lørenskog IF.

In 1992 he joined SFK Lyn, but was scarcely used on the first team and was loaned out to Bærum SK in 1993. With Lyn he experienced two spells in the Eliteserien and two in the 1. divisjon, suffering two relegations (1993, 1997) and winning one promotion (1996). He was mostly their first-choice goalkeeper from 1996 through 1998, but is remembered for a loss against Brann in 1997 when he asked to be substituted off. After the 1998 season he was poised to join Skeid, but the board of directors overturned the coaches' decision to sign him, and he instead returned to Kjelsås. He retired after one season.

Ahead of the 2009 season Stenshagen became head coach of fifth-tier team Kragerø IF, where he also played for several seasons and scored a number of goals. He did not continue coaching in 2010, but returned in the latter half of 2011. He also coached the junior team.

Stenshagen worked for many years as a prison guard in Oslo Prison, and eventually started in Skien Prison, being directly involved with their infamous prisoner Anders Behring Breivik.
