= Åkebergveien =

Street in Oslo, Norway

Coordinates: 59°54′36.88″N 10°46′27.19″E

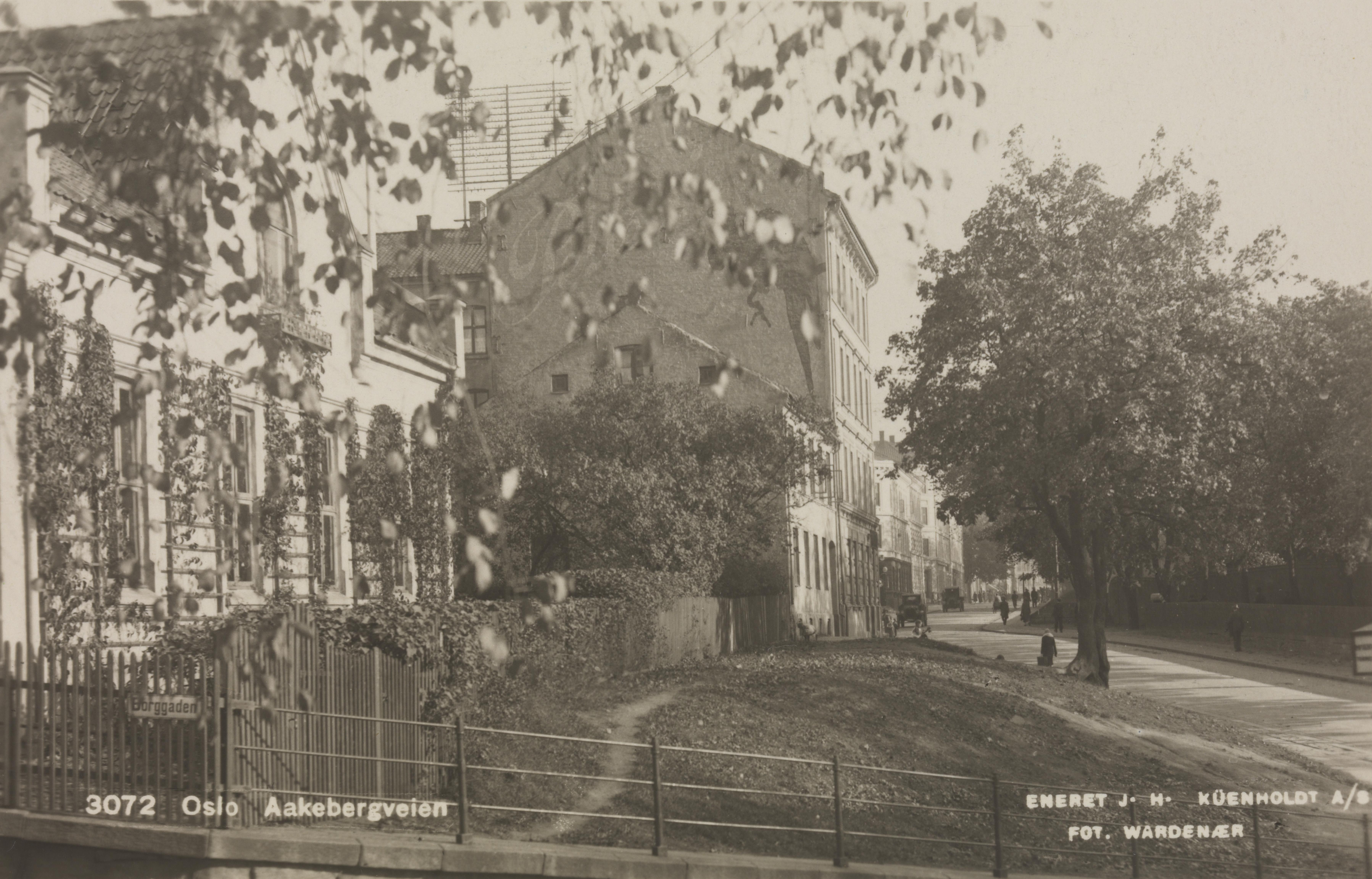
Old postcard from Åkebergveien

Åkebergveien is a street in Oslo, Norway. The street is named after the former farm Åkeberg.

Åkebergveien 11 formerly belonged to the brewery Ytteborgs Aktiebryggeri. In 1934 the building was acquired by the city of Oslo, and after rebuilding became part of the district prison of Oslo, currently department B of Oslo Prison (Norwegian: Oslo fengsel). The prison is popularly called "Bayer'n", due to its history as a brewery. During the occupation of Norway by Nazi Germany, part of the prison was used by the Germans for political prisoners and detainees. The former Botsfengselet, currently department A of Oslo Prison, is located nearby.

Åkebergveien 50 was the first municipal apartment building of Oslo.
