= Stig Millehaugen =

Norwegian convict and prison escapee (1969–2026)

Stig Millehaugen (8 May 1969 – 29 January 2026) was a Norwegian criminal who was convicted of several crimes, including armed robbery, the 1992 murder of a prison guard during escape, prison escape in 2000, and the murder of Pakistani-Norwegian gang leader Mohammad Javed in 2009. In the 1980s, he was a member of Tveitagjengen (Tveita gang). He has been described at times as "Norway's most dangerous" and was held for some time in total isolation in prison. In 2022, while on a brief prison furlough, he escaped from prison and was recaptured a week later.

== Biography ==
Millehaugen was born on 8 May 1969. In the 1980s, he became a member of Tveitagjengen, a gang in Tveita, and in 1986 he was arrested for the first time.

In December 1990, he robbed a post office in Oslo, and two months later the Oppsal branch of Sparebanken NOR. In February 1992, he was sentenced to six years' imprisonment for these crimes.

In July 1992, he escaped from prison, robbed the Svartskog post office, and then the Nesbru post office. During the Nesbru robbery, hostages were taken.

In December 1992, he managed to receive a gun smuggled into prison. He shot and killed a prison guard and took another hostage, forcing him to drive him out of prison. However, Millehaugen turned himself in the next day. In August 1993, he was sentenced to seventeen years in prison for the 1992 murder and robberies.

In 2000, during a prison furlough from Ullersmo Prison, Millehaugen escaped and evaded capture for eight months. During his escape he was suspected by police of an armed robbery of a Kreditkassen branch during which shots were fired, however he was acquitted in a 2003 of the robbery charge and was convicted of illegal possession of a weapon during his escape.

After his arrest and return to prison in 2001, Millehaugen was placed in Skien prison. On 14 October 2001, there was an attempt to breach the prison with a fifteen-ton wheel loader. As police suspected Millehaugen was involved, he was transferred to Ringerike Prison, where he was isolated from other prisoners.

Millehaugen sued the state in 2002 to improve his prison conditions. The verdict found that Millehaugen was linked to the attempted Skien prison-break via a letter.

In 2008, he changed his surname to Bergquist, but changed it back to Millehaugen in 2009.

In January 2009, he shot and killed Pakistani-Norwegian Mohammed "Jeddi" Javed, who was a leader of the Young Guns gang, at the orders of the rival B-gang leader. In 2012, he was sentenced to 21 years' imprisonment for the murder, including a mandatory minimum of ten years, this being the maximum civilian criminal penalty in Norway.

On 1 June 2022, Millehaugen was given a short prison furlough, but did not return to the Trondheim prison when it ended. Instead, he boarded a passenger aircraft to Oslo and then a taxi to Oslo Central Station, where he was seen on surveillance videos. On 8 June 2022, Millehaugen was arrested by police while walking along a road in the Østmarka area with a large backpack; police located his tent site in the woods.

Millehaugen died in prison on 29 January 2026, at the age of 56.
