= Life imprisonment in Norway =

The sentence of life imprisonment under Norwegian law is restricted to the military penal code (e.g. for aiding the enemy during a time of war). In the civilian penal code, a law passed in 2002 allows for an indeterminate penalty that could, in theory, result in life imprisonment. The first Norwegian prisoner ever sentenced to the 21 years' preventive detention (Norwegian: 21 års forvaring) was Viggo Kristiansen, who was convicted of murder and rape, but exonerated in 2022.

== Maximum penalty under Norwegian law ==
There are three types of maximum penalty laws:

- The maximum penalty under the military penal code is life imprisonment.
- The maximum determinate penalty (civilian penal code) is 21 years' imprisonment, but only a small percentage of prisoners serve more than 14 years. Prisoners will typically get unsupervised parole for weekends after serving a third of their sentence (a maximum of 7 years) and can receive early release after serving two thirds of their sentence (a maximum of 14 years). In 2008, to fulfill its requirements under the Rome Statute, Norway created a new maximal penalty of 30 years for crimes against humanity.
- The indeterminate penalty (civilian penal code), called "preventive detention" (Norwegian: forvaring), is set at up to 21 years' imprisonment, with no eligibility for parole for a time period of at least 10 years, depending on the sentence. If the prisoner is still considered dangerous after serving the original sentence, the detention can be extended by five years at a time. Renewal of the detention every five years can in theory result in actual life imprisonment. Preventive detention is used when the prisoner is deemed a danger to society and there is a great chance of them committing violent crimes in the future. However, after the minimum time period has elapsed, the offender can petition for parole once every year, and this may be granted if it is determined that they are no longer a danger to society.

== List of people sentenced to preventive detention in Norway ==
This is a partial list of people sentenced to Preventive detention in Norway since its introduction in 2001.

Name	Reason	Sentencing date	Highest Court sentencing	Notes
Viggo Kristiansen	Murder and rape	1 June 2001	29 March 2012	Convicted of what became known as the Baneheia child murders. Kristiansen, along with Jan Helge Andersen, was convicted of raping and murdering Lena Sløgedal Paulsen (10) and Stine Sofie Sørstrønen (8) in 2000. In 2021, the sentence of Viggo Kristiansen was set aside due to new evidence indicating that he is innocent. Kristiansen was finally acquitted in 2022 and awarded compensation for wrongful imprisonment.
Yasin Mohammed Jabr	Murder, attempted murder	4 February 2003	17 June 2003	Jabr was convicted of the premeditated murder of his wife and the attempted murder of her aunt and his own daughter on 27 July 2001.
Geir Hårstad	Murder	28 March 2003	Did not appeal	Hårstad raped and murdered his 11-year-old step-daughter Kristina Molvik on 28 September 2002. Hårstad had previously served ten years in prison for the murder of his former partner, 19-year-old Laila Helen Lie in 1987.
Lars Harnes	Armed robbery	24 February 2005	20 February 2006	A known mobster associated with the Bandidos group, Harnes, together with Daniel de Linde and Petter Tharaldsen robbed DnBs office at Aker Brygge with automatic weapons on 30 August 2004. Released in 2013. Rearrested in 2015, charged with conspiracy to commit murder.
Metkel Negassie Betew	Armed robbery	15 March 2006	29 June 2007	Convicted of the NOKAS robbery, the largest robbery in Norwegian history. Released on parole in 2014. Rearrested for serious drug offences in 2015.
Kjell Alrich Schumann	Armed robbery and murder	29 June 2007	29 June 2007	Convicted of the NOKAS robbery and of killing a police officer during the robbery.
Ole Kristian Bjørnsen	Murder	26 March 2009	29 March 2010	Convicted of the murder of Ragnar Bjertnes Abrahamsen and Jan Petter Aarstad on the "Farm of Death".
Unidentified male (39)	Murder	11 September 2009	9 February 2010	On the morning of 22 March 2009, the unidentified man brutally stabbed to death a pregnant Linda Anett Hansen (35), her husband Ole-Roger Olsen (44), and Olsen's mother, Ragna Elida Christensen (61).
Erik Andersen	Child sexual abuse and rape	14 June 2010	did not appeal	The infamous "Pocket Man", Andersen sexually abused and raped over 70 young boys over a 50-year period.
Helge Ivar Breland Pedersen	Murder	12 February 2010	8 October 2010	Convicted of brutally murdering his former girlfriend, Ann Helen Karlsen. Ann was struck with a hammer, strangled, and her body then dumped in the sea off Tananger on the night of 6 March 2005. Pedersen had previous convictions for violence against his ex-wife as well as the murder of his previous girlfriend's father.
Stig Millehaugen	Murder	29 April 2011	28 March 2012	A notorious mobster and hitman, Stig Millehaugen murdered Mohammed "Jeddi" Javed on 19 January 2009 in what was described as a "liquidation". Javed was a known leader within Oslo's criminal underground.
Thor Aage Mathisen	Child sexual abuse and extortion	11 July 2011	14 March 2012	Known as the "Helicopter doctor" due to working as an aeromedical anesthesiologist with the Norwegian Air Ambulance service, Mathisen sexually abused a number of underage girls, including seven cases of rape. He was also convicted of extortion. The case became known as the Helicopter doctor case.
Unidentified male (40)	Rape	16 October 2011	-	The case handled by the Oslo District Court is described as one of the worst rape cases in the capital's modern history. The man was convicted of eight different rapes, many of them carried out with violence. Most of the victims told that the man had taken such a powerful stranglehold on them that they were afraid to die and that they gave up resisting. The man originally came from Egypt and was granted residence in Norway in 2002. He had applied for permanent residence on the basis of being homosexual. The victims were all women.
Anders Behring Breivik	Murder and terrorism	24 August 2012	did not appeal	Committed the 2011 Norway attacks, which killed 77 people and injured over 300.
Unidentified male (56)	Child sexual abuse and incest	12 November 2012	-	Convicted of raping and sexually abusing his step-daughter over a period of five years, beginning when she was 12 years old. Previously convicted of having an incestuous relationship with his own daughter that resulted in two children.
Unidentified male (38)	Rape	20 November 2012	14 March 2013	Defendant drugged and raped five women. Some of the rapes were videotaped, and the case is described as one of the most serious sex abuse cases in Norwegian history.
Unidentified male (48)	Rape and death threats against the Prime Minister	12 December 2012	-	Convicted of raping his ex-wife as well as making death threats against his step-father Martin Kolberg and Prime Minister Jens Stoltenberg.
Unidentified male (50)	Rape and attempted rape	19 January 2013	-	Convicted of raping two women and attempting to rape two others. The man, from Vestfold, had previously been convicted of serious sexual offenses including rape, but was released on parole in 2002.
Unidentified male (19)	Rape and attempted rape	19 January 2013	-	Convicted of violently raping a 19-year-old woman as well as brutally assaulting and attempting to rape another. The Somalian immigrant had previously sexually molested at least 11 women.
Unidentified male (45)	Child sexual abuse	21 March 2013	-	The 45-year-old truck driver was convicted of sexually molesting no fewer than twenty boys aged 12 to 16 years.
Unidentified female (49)	Child sexual abuse, and physical abuse	5 April 2013	20 February 2014	The 49-year-old woman, known as the "Alvdal-mother", along with her husband, subjected her eldest daughter to severe sexual abuse from the age of five. At the time of her conviction, she was already serving prison time for sexually abusing her two other children, as well as two neighbouring children. A self-declared paedophile with high risk of re-offending, she is the first woman to be sentenced to preventive detention in Norway.
Unidentified male (47)	Child sexual abuse, rape, incest and physical abuse	12 July 2013	-	The 47-year-old father-of-two had previous convictions from 2001 to 2010 when he raped two boys aged 13 and 14. He was this time convicted of raping and otherwise molesting his own children in a five-year period, starting in 2006.
Steven Dan Danielsen	Rape and Murder	3 March 2014	19 September 2014	The 24-year-old Danielsen, was convicted of the "Aksla-murder". He randomly attacked Anja Weløy Aarseth (21) while she was out jogging in the hills surrounding Ålesund, before raping and murdering her. He was also convicted of attempted robbery as well as making threats against police officers.
Julio Kopseng	Rape, aggravated assault	13 February 2015	12 April 2016	The former television dancer and model agency owner was convicted of raping nine women. He was also convicted of aggravated assault against his former partner, who he allegedly raped hundreds of times. At the time of sentencing Kopseng was already serving time in prison for the rape of three other women. The case has been dubbed "One of the most serious rape cases in Norwegian legal history.".
Unidentified male (44)	Child sexual abuse, rape, sexual abuse of animals	5 October 2016	-	Convicted of sexually abusing eight girls/women between the ages of 0 and 18, as well as possession of large quantities of child pornography. He was also convicted of sexually abusing a sheep and a horse.
Donatas Lukosevicius	Murder	25 July 2016	Withdrew his appeal	Immigrant from Lithuania. Strangled to death 8-year-old Monika Sviglinskaja, daughter of his former girlfriend, before hanging her in a closet for her mother to find.
Elisabeth Terese Aaslie	Murder	3 July 2019	-	Drugged and murdered her father, as well as her boyfriend.
Philip Manshaus	Murder and terrorism	11 June 2020		Murder of his step-sister, and terrorist attack against the al-Noor mosque. Manshaus's case was reopened 2025 on the grounds that he had been insane when he committed the crime; his new sentence was 21 years without extended detention.
Zikrija Krkic	Murder	27 August 2020	-	Initially convicted of gunning down two people in a café in the village of Trnopolje in Bosnia with an AK-47 assault rifle on July 28, 2014. However, he was acquitted in February 2022.

As of 2011, there are 76 offenders that are serving a sentence of preventive detention.

== See also ==
- Incarceration in Norway
