= Norwegian Correctional Service =

Prisons and probation service in Norway

Norwegian Correctional Services Directorate
- Coat of arms

Directorate for execution of custody, imprisonment, probation and various community services. overview
- Formed: 1 January 2001
- Jurisdiction: Ministry of Justice and Public Security
- Headquarters: P.O. box 344, 2001 Lillestrøm
- Website: kriminalomsorgen.no

The Norwegian Correctional Service (Norwegian: Kriminalomsorgen) is a government agency responsible for the implementation of detention and punishment in a way that is reassuring for the society and for preventing crimes. The agency is governed by the Norwegian Ministry of Justice and Public Security.

The agency was created as the Prison Board (Norwegian: Fængselsstyrelsen later spelled Fengselsstyret) in 1875 and was subordinate to the Department of Justice and Police, headed by a director. The Prison Board was disbanded in 2002 and replaced by the Norwegian Correctional Service.

Kragerø Prison is (as of 2016) Norway's fourth prison for females and a fifth is expected to start operating as a wing of Kongsvinger Prison in the beginning of 2017.

== Organization ==
Emblem of the Prison Board

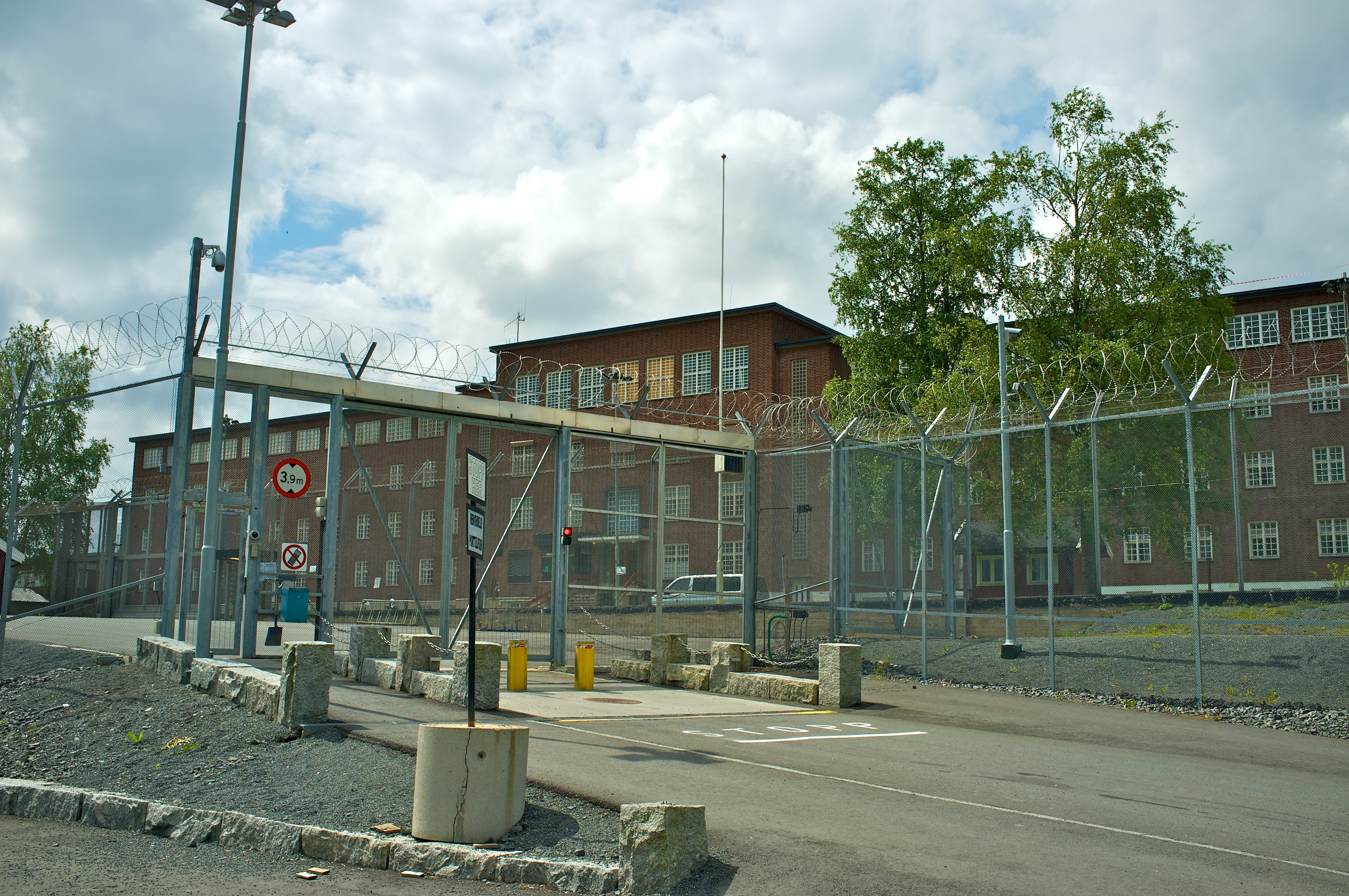
Ila Detention and Security Prison

The Correctional Service is organised into a hierarchy consisting of the Correctional Services Directorate (Kriminalomsorgsdirektoratet) which is responsible for the professional and administrative management, a regional level, consisting of five regional administrations, and a local level with individual prison and probation offices. In addition, the Correctional Service of Norway Staff Academy (KRUS), which has responsibility for agency training of prison officers and The Correctional IT services (KITT), which is responsible for the development, implementation and customization of Information technology systems in the agency.

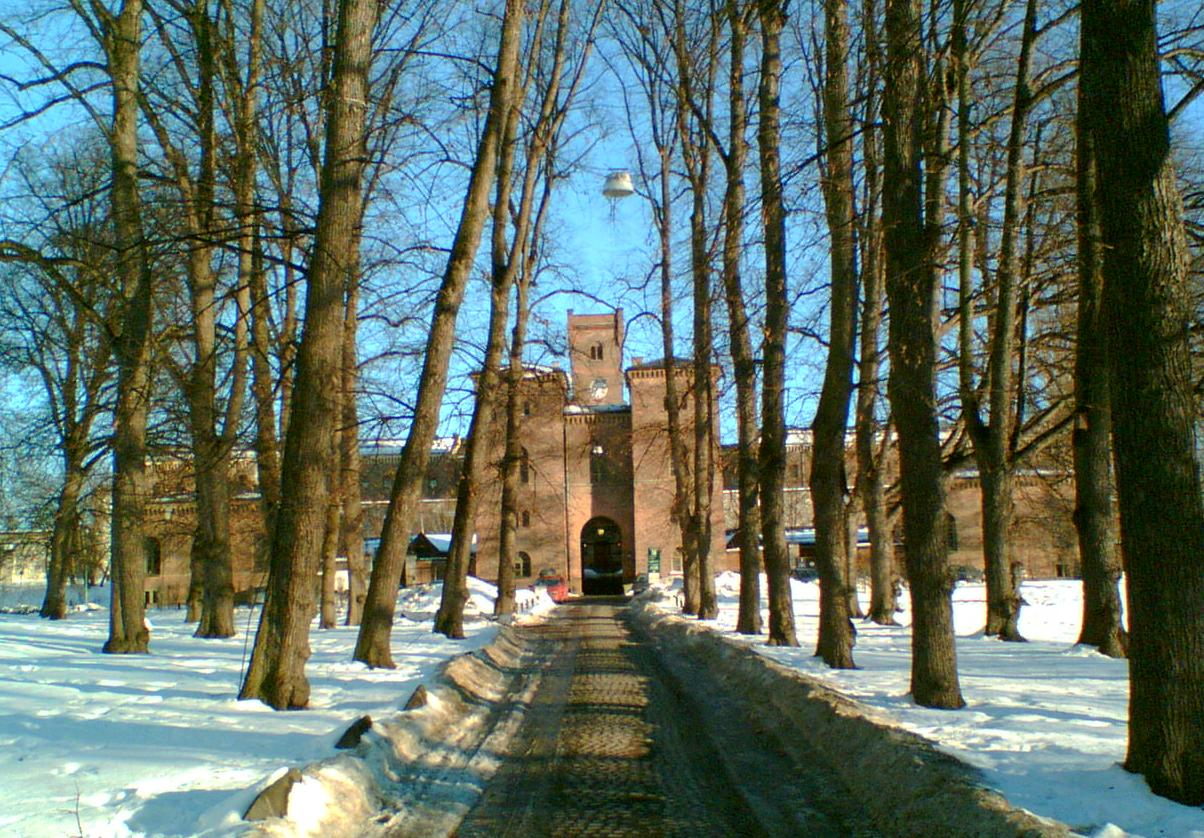
Oslo Prison

== The regions ==
Correctional Services is divided into five regions.

=== Eastern Region ===
Correctional Services Eastern Region includes the counties of Oslo and Østfold, Akershus, and Innlandet. The administration is in Oslo. The region has a capacity of 1,557 inmates, divided to Bredtveit Prison, Halden Prison, Ravneberget Prison, Indre Østfold Prison, Oslo Prison, Sarpsborg Prison, Ila Detention and Security Prison, Ullersmo Prison, Kongsvinger Prison, Ilseng Prison, Hamar Prison, Vestoppland Prison, and Bruvoll Prison and halfway houses in the Arups gate and Sandaker in Oslo, in addition to the probation offices in Oslo, Østfold, Akershus, and Innlandet counties.

In order to decrease costs for interpreters and other special needs of foreign inmates, foreign nationals serving sentences involving subsequent deportation were in 2012 incarcerated in an institution holding only foreigners as they are not intended to be re-integrated into Norwegian society. This institution opened in December 2012 in Kongsvinger.

=== Southern Region ===
Correctional Service southern region includes the counties of Buskerud, Vestfold, and Telemark. The administration is located in the city of Tønsberg, and Regional Director is Bjørn Krogsrud. Correctional Service Southern Region includes Hof Prison, Bastøy Prison, Telemark Prison, Søndre Vestfold Prison, Nordre Vestfold Prison, Sandefjord Prison, Sem Prison, Ringerike Prison, Hassel Prison, Drammen Prison and Drammen halfway house in addition to the probation offices in Buskerud, Telemark, and Vestfold.

=== Southwestern Region ===
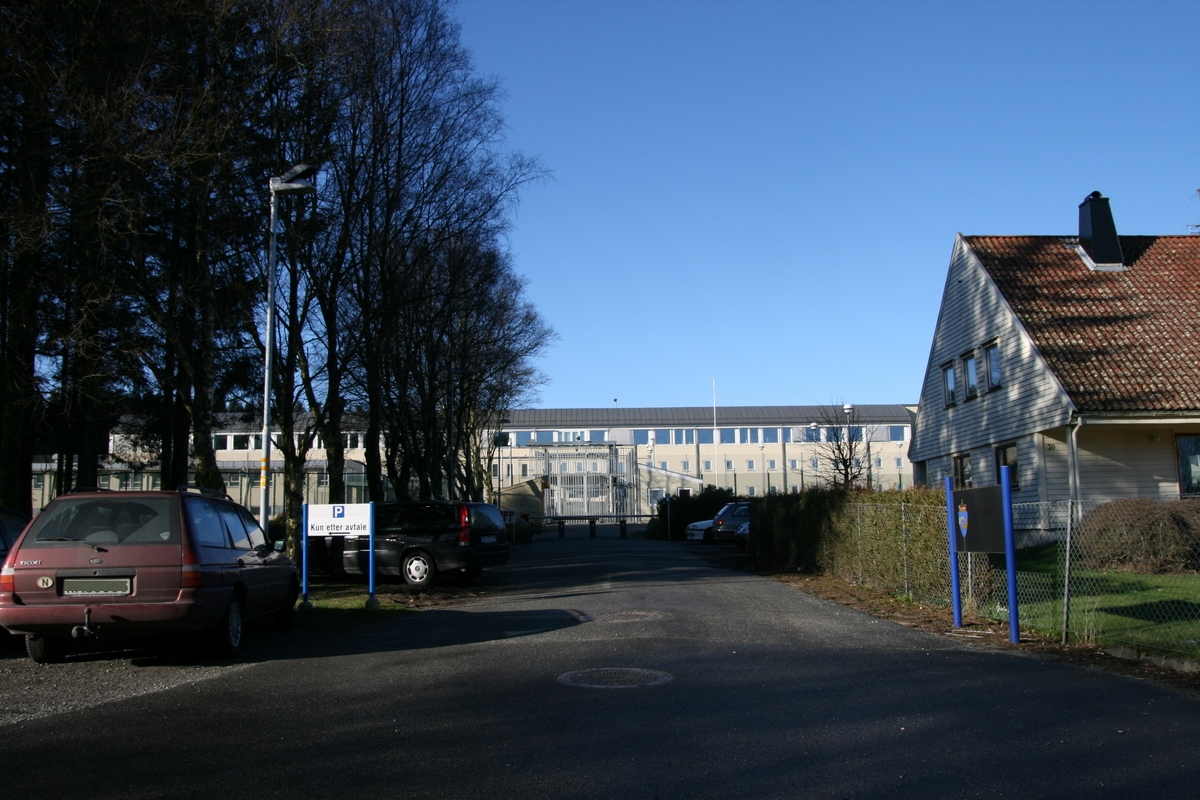
Stavanger Prison

Correctional Services south-western region includes the counties of Rogaland and Agder. The administration is located in Sandnes.

The region consists of Agder Prison, Evje, Agder Prison, Froland, Agder Prison, Mandal, Solholmen halfway house, Agder probation offices (Kristiansand, Arendal and Lyngdal), Auklend halfway house, Haugesund Prison, Rogaland probation offices (Stavanger and Haugesund), Sandeid Prison, Stavanger Prison and Åna Prison.

=== Western Region ===
Correctional Services, Western Region includes the counties of Vestland and Møre og Romsdal. The administration is located in Bergen, and the Regional Director is Per Sigurd Våge.

The region consists of Bergen Prison, Vik Prison, Ålesund Prison, Hustad Prison, Bjørgvin Prison, and Lyderhorn halfway house. Probation offices are in Bergen, Molde, Ålesund, Kristiansund, Florø, and Sogndalsfjøra. The Center for Drug Programs is under court control in Bergen.

=== Northern Region ===
Correctional Services, Northern Region includes the counties of Trøndelag, Nordland, Troms, and Finnmark. The office is located in Trondheim.

The Northern Region consists of Trondheim Prison, Verdal Prison, Mosjøen Prison, Bodø Prison, Bodø halfway house, Vadsø Prison, and Tromsø Prison, in addition to the probation offices in Finnmark, Troms, Nordland, northern Trøndelag, and southern Trøndelag.

== See also ==
- Incarceration in Norway
