= Orderud case =

1999 triple murder in Norway

Coordinates: 59.9755°N 11.2518°E

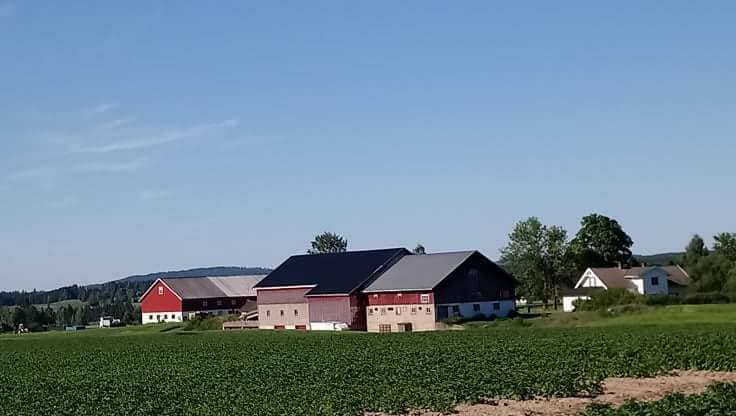
- Orderud farm - also referred to as Olerud farm in public registers.
- Location: Sørum, Akershus, Norway
- Deaths: Marie Orderud (84); Kristian Orderud (81); Anne Orderud Paust (47)
- Suspects: Per Kristian Orderud; Veronica Orderud; Kristin Kirkemo; Lars Grønnerød
- Verdict: Complicity to commit premeditated murder
- Convictions: 21 years (P. Orderud); 21 years (V. Orderud); 18 years (Grønnerød); 16 years (Kirkemo)

The Orderud case (Norwegian: Orderud-saken) was a triple murder that occurred in Sørum, Akershus, Norway, on 22 May 1999. The victims were 47-year-old Anne Orderud Paust; her mother, 84-year-old Marie Orderud; and her father, 81-year-old Kristian Orderud, who were found shot and killed at their country estate.

Anne's brother Per Kristian Orderud, his wife Veronica, his sister-in-law Kristin Kirkemo and Kristin's ex-boyfriend Lars Grønnerød were arrested and convicted of complicity in premeditated murder in 2001. The case generated much attention in the Norwegian media.

== Background ==
On 17 July 1998, while heading to work at the Norwegian Ministry of Defence, Anne Orderud Paust, personal secretary to Defence Minister Dag Jostein Fjærvoll, discovered a charge of explosives under her vehicle. The 500-gram device was of the Solex type. The incident was given "extremely high priority" with the Oslo police. On 12 August, Anne's husband Per, a high-level official with the Ministry of Foreign Affairs, stated that there had been an attempt to ignite a propane gas tank in the stairwell of the Paust family's apartment block in the Skillebekk district of Oslo. Per discovered the 5-kilogram tank with an open vent outside his door, which was doused in gasoline. Officials from the Oslo fire department claimed that the whole building could have easily been "blown apart" had the tank ignited. Both assassination attempts received wide publicity and caused a media sensation, but no one was ultimately charged or arrested in connection with either of the two incidents.

The couple spent a few months in New York City, where Per worked as a temporary Consul-General, until they returned to Norway in January 1999. Per was then diagnosed with cancer and died after a short illness in May that same year. Around 15 May, an anonymous person called and warned authorities that Anne and her parents would be murdered. Despite extensive searches, the caller was never found, and one week later the same people were found dead.

== Murders ==
On the night of 22 May, Anne Orderud Paust and her parents, Marie (b. 1915) and Kristian Orderud (b. 1918), were shot and killed in the parents' home on the Orderud Estate in Sørum, Akershus. Hiding in the adjacent woods until nightfall, the assailant entered the house sometime between midnight and 5am by climbing on to the second floor porch and breaking the window on the veranda door.

Probably awoken by the noise, Marie Orderud confronted the intruder and was shot at close range and killed instantly. Meanwhile, Anne Orderud Paust also entered the room and was shot and killed in the same manner. Both women were found in their nightgowns. The assailant then went to the couples' bedroom, where Kristian Orderud was lying. He was impaired by his old age and was unable to escape or otherwise offer any resistance to the gunman. He was executed from point-blank range. The assailant then fled through the same back door used for entry, the only visible trace being the broken window in the door.

The next morning, Kristian's brother Hans came to visit, and upon seeing the broken door went in for a closer look. He then discovered the bodies of his family members and contacted the police. The killings happened just weeks after Anne Orderud Paust had voluntarily declined to be assigned close protection officers from the Police Security Service.

== Investigation ==
Early in the investigation, the police felt confident that the assailant or assailants were familiar with the victims and that the victims probably knew their killer. The investigators theorized that the time of the killings had not been coincidental. Because only a handful of people knew that Anne would be visiting at that precise time, the investigators concluded that the killer had the house under careful surveillance and acted upon seeing her car parked outside. The main theory is that Anne Orderud Paust was the main target of the killer or killers.

The police further speculated that the victims did not initially realize the danger they were facing, the location of the bodies in the estate's second floor indicated that they did not consider escaping when they faced their intruder, and despite the break-in nobody made any effort to alert the police or others. One explanation may be that the victims initially did not feel the intruder to be threatening and thus did not see it as necessary to contact the police. The fact that Kristian Orderud was killed while lying in his bed suggested that the perpetrator knew exactly who the victims were. This was backed up by the fact that nothing was missing from the house, ruling out a robbery.

In June, four people were charged with premeditated murder or complicity in premeditated murder: Anne Orderud Paust's brother Per Kristian Orderud (b. 1954); his wife Veronica Orderud (b. 1972); Veronica Orderud's half sister Kristin Kirkemo, later Kristin Kirkemo Haukeland (b. 1973); and her former partner Lars Grønnerød (b. 1958). The motive for the killings according to the prosecution was a conflict over ownership of the Orderud estate and farm. Marie and Kristian Orderud were registered as the owners of the farm even though their son for years had operated it and wanted to take it over. Prosecutors believed that all four were involved in the murder, but neither the investigation nor the subsequent trials gave answers to who actually carried out the killings.

== Verdict ==
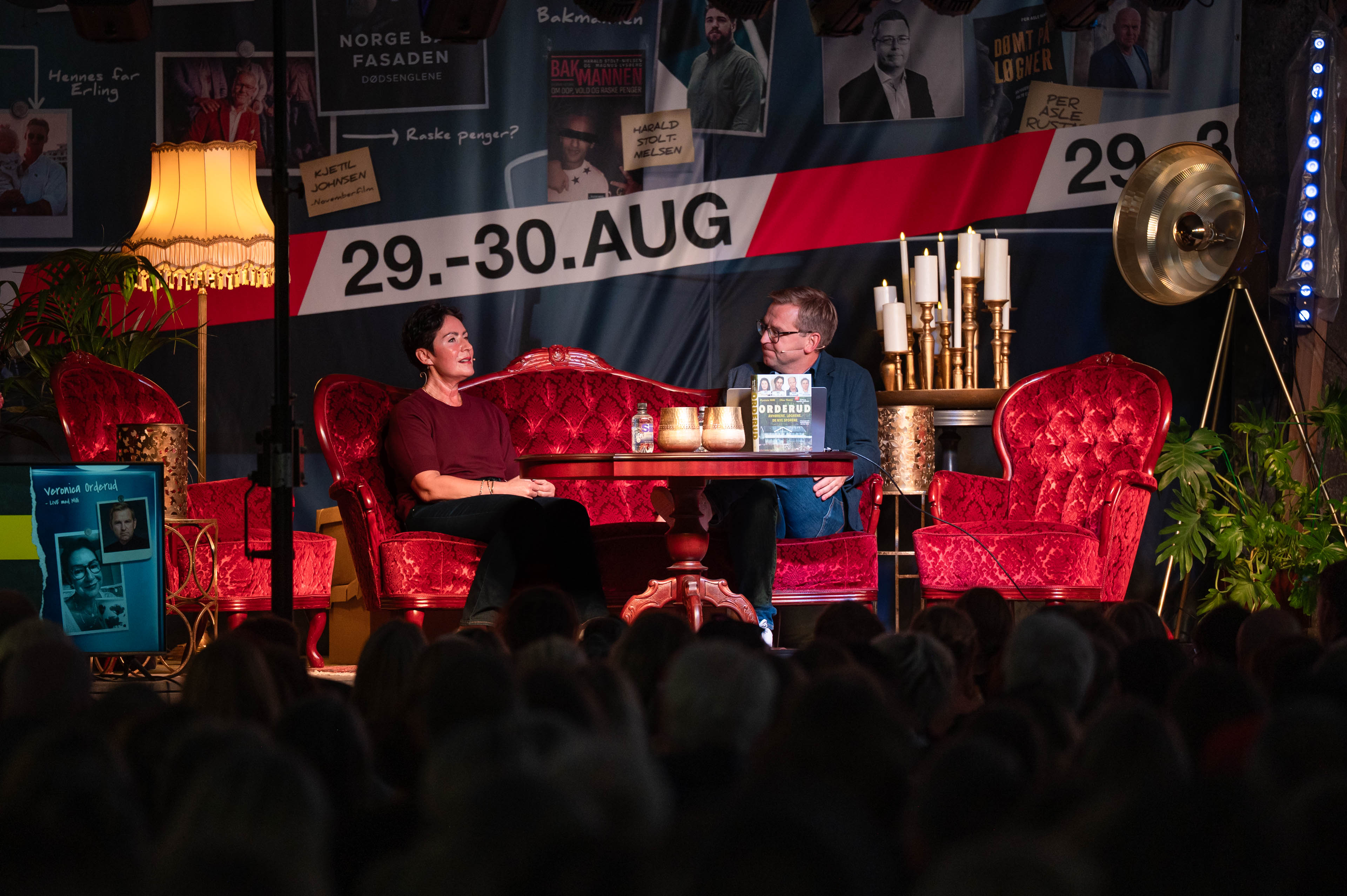
Veronica Orderud interviewed by Øystein Milli at the True Crime festival in Arendal, Norway, 2025

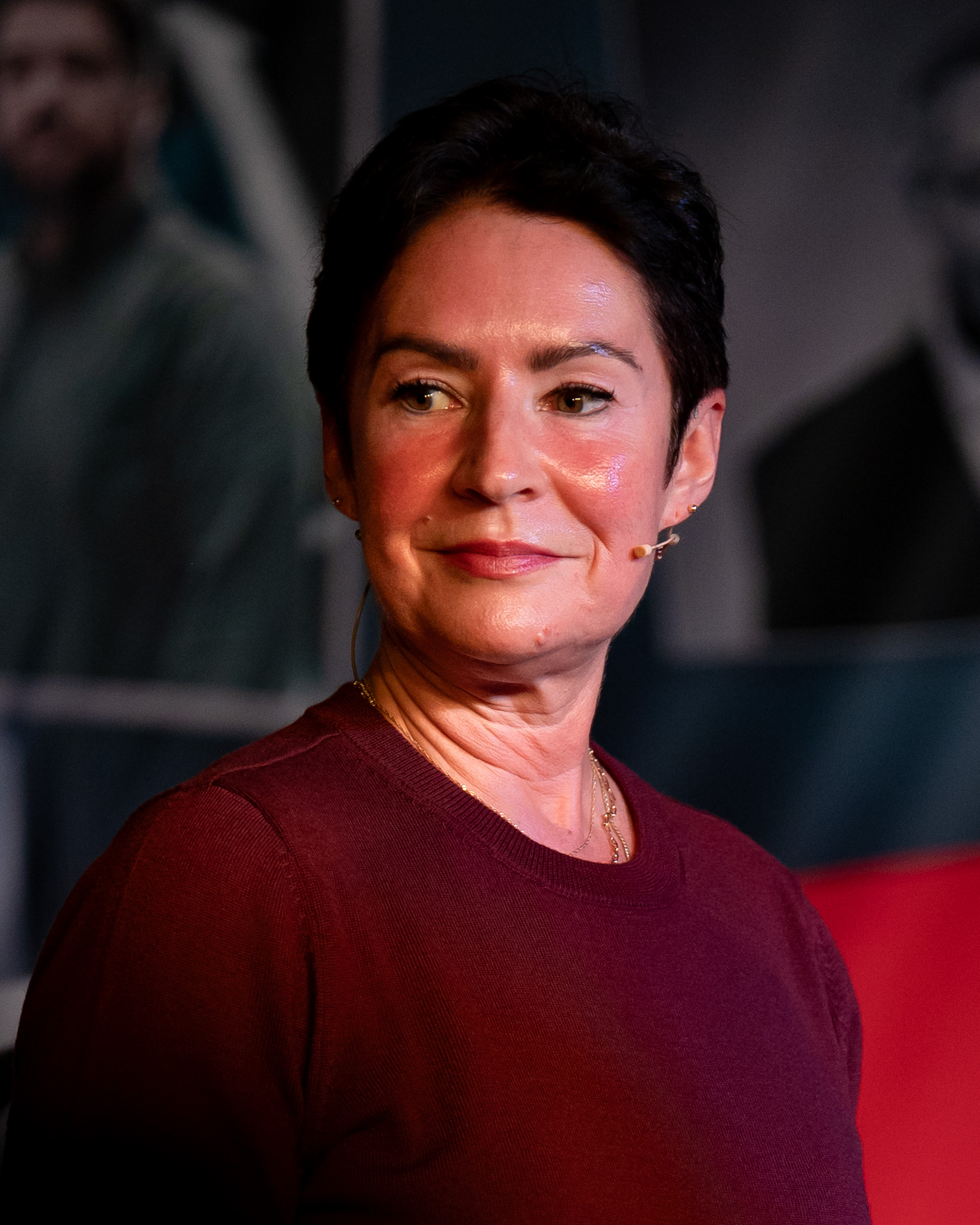
Portrait of Veronica Orderud taken at the True Crime festival in Arendal, Norway, 2025

On 22 June 2001, both Per and Veronica Orderud, along with Kristin Kirkemo, were found guilty on all charges and received sentences of 21 years in prison. Lars Grønnerød was found guilty of illegal weapons charges and sentenced to 2.5 years in prison. The Orderud couple and Kristin Kirkemo appealed the case, claiming that they were innocent. Grønnerød did not appeal, but the prosecuting authority chose to appeal Grønnerød's sentencing because it believed that his punishment was too mild. On April 5 2002, Per Orderud was sentenced to 21 years in prison and lost the inheritance right to the farm. Veronica Orderud was sentenced to 21 years in prison. Kristin Kirkemo was sentenced to 16 years in prison. Lars Grønnerød was sentenced to 18 years in prison.

== Aftermath ==
The murder of Anne Orderud Paust and her parents received media attention like that of no other criminal case in the country's history, with almost daily coverage in the month after the killings, and very intimate accounts of the accused individuals using their full names. The media coverage led to debate about the media's handling of the case and the police and the defenders' leaks to the media.

== Balkan theory ==
According to NRK Brennpunkt, reliable sources independently tie both Per Paust and Anne Orderud Paust to Norwegian intelligence services. Per Paust's death fourteen days before the Orderud murders, reportedly from cancer after short-term sickness, has been suspected by people close to him to in reality have been caused by poisoning. Per Paust had worked in Serbia during the 1999 NATO bombing of Yugoslavia, describing it in private as his most difficult task ever, balancing between the two sides in the conflict and attempting to stop illegal weapons smuggling. Anne Orderud Paust in turn worked with managing threats against the Foreign Ministry.

Kristin Kirkemo, who was convicted for co-conspiracy to the murders, had in turn established close ties to the Yugoslavian mafia in Oslo. The godparents to her son are considered by police to be part of the Yugoslavian mafia involved in the weapons trade, drug trade, and illegal gambling. Income from the mafia reportedly financed Kosovo Albanian guerilla activity. In early 1999, Norwegian police took part in a European-wide crackdown on the Kosovo Albanian mafia, including Princ Dobroshi, which has been proposed as background for the murders, although no direct link has been uncovered. Although overturned in the Eidsivating Court of Appeal, the Nes District Court initially deemed it proven that Kristin Kirkemo placed dynamite under Anne Paus Orderud's car in the 1998 assassination attempt.

A cousin to Per Orderud claims to have been in contact with criminal sources in Oslo that alleged that two Yugoslavians from Sweden committed the murders in an ordered hit. Private investigator Tore Sandberg in 2009 produced the name of a suspected killer from Balkan who allegedly committed the murders along with two others.

== See also ==
- Baneheia murders
- Murder of Faiza Ashraf
- Life imprisonment in Norway
