= Erik Andersen (child molester) =

Norwegian criminal (born 1952)

- Born: 20 March 1952 (age 74); Bergen, Norway
- Other name: The Pocket Man
- Occupation: Former garage owner
- Children: 2
- Status: Convicted and serving prison sentence, incarcerated in Ila Prison
- Convictions: Child sexual abuse and rape
- Penalty: Preventive detention with a term of 9 years

Erik Andersen (born 20 March 1952), also referred to in the media as The Pocket Man (in Norwegian "Lommemannen"), is a convicted Norwegian child molester from Bergen. He was arrested in 2008, accused of molesting hundreds of children since 1976, and in 2010, he was convicted and sentenced to preventive detention with a minimum term of 9 years, with the possibility of extension for as long as he is deemed a danger to society. He was released in November 2014.

"The Pocket Man" was originally the name given by the Norwegian police and media to the then unidentified child molester. The man who has been at large since 1976, has been accused of committing sex crimes against minors throughout Southern Norway. "The Pocket Man" might have lured boys in numerous localities and has been characterized by law enforcement as a "dangerous serial criminal". The last known incident of the Pocket Man took place in Skjolden in Luster Municipality on 14 June 2006. The police have registered about 160 cases. The police allege that several occurrences also have not been reported. In August 2009 the suspect was formally indicted and charged with 60 cases, including two cases of rape of small boys. He cannot be prosecuted for cases that are older than ten years. The suspect has admitted to involvement in 20 of the cases.

The identity of "The Pocket Man" was unknown to the police until, after several years of investigation, they identified a man from Bergen who was arrested and indicted as the perpetrator on 11 January 2008. The suspect remained anonymous until he was identified as Erik Andersen by Norway's largest daily Verdens Gang on 22 August 2009.

"The Pocket Man" was during one period of the investigations known as "The Bandage Man", first time in a case from Bergen in 1980. The police realized that this was the same offender in the autumn of 2007.

== Biography ==
Erik Andersen was born in Hylkje in Åsane Municipality, Norway (now part of Bergen Municipality. He ran his own garage called "Erik Andersen Lakkeringsverksted". Andersen has been active in motor sports for several years, particularly as a trainer in Bergen Trial Team. He is divorced and has two children. Andersen sometimes spelled his name as Eric Andersen, despite the fact that his legal name is Erik Andersen. He was identified on the front cover of Verdens Gang, the largest newspaper of Norway, on 22 August 2009. He was also identified by Bergens Tidende the following day. Subsequently, he has been identified by Dagbladet, Nettavisen, TV 2, Dagsavisen, Bergensavisen and Aftenposten. Norwegian media had previously refrained from using his name and picture as requested by the police, in order not to harm the investigation. However, the investigation was completed in May 2009. Legally, the media are allowed to identify suspects in criminal cases. Bernt Olufsen stated that Verdens Gang chose to identify him because of the scale and seriousness of the crimes, which according to Olufsen meant the public had a right to know his identity.

== Offenses ==
=== Mode of operation ===
The modus operandi of "The Pocket Man" was the same in all known cases: The perpetrator tricked young boys to touch his genitals, for instance by tricking them to "search for" a key in his pocket, where he had removed or cut a hole in the lining, or to adjust a bandage on his thigh. The more serious offenses he is alleged to have committed include oral sex, which in some cases borders on the Norwegian criminal code's definition of rape. The police allege that "The Pocket Man" on several occasions forced the boys to perform oral sex on him. Oral sex is equated with intercourse in the Norwegian penal code and, if performed under coercion, has an upper limit of 21 years in prison, the maximum sentencing in Norway. The police have later stated that the most serious case has an upper limit of 15 years.

Other commons traits of the cases are:

- All victims were young boys aged between 6 and 12 years. Little girls were only employed as lookouts.
- Dark-skinned victims are clearly overrepresented.
- Both "The Pocket Man" and "The Bandage Man" are said to have paid the victims after their offenses.
- Various tricks were employed to lure the children.

=== Time ===
The first assault known to the police as of January 2008, took place in Åsane, Bergen in the latter half of 1976. During the first years the perpetrator is said to have lured children by asking them to help change a bandage in intimate places, and he was named "The Bandage Man". DNA evidence procured in 2007 revealed that "The Bandage Man" was also active in Oslo. The police therefore concluded that "The Bandage Man" and "The Pocket Man" were one and the same person.

As early as 1983 or 84 "The Pocket Man" made an attempt against two boys at Garnes in Bergen. The boys ran away.

On 27 November 1994 "The Pocket Man" struck at a kindergarten at Søndre Nordstrand, Oslo. As of January 2008 this is the earliest known offense by "The Pocket Man" in Oslo. Throughout the 1990s all known offenses in Oslo took place during weekends, and other offenses all took place in Bergen (the distance between Oslo and Bergen is about 500 kilometers). Starting in 2000 this pattern began to change: Incidents were no longer recorded in the Bergen area. During the subsequent years the incidents were limited to the Oslo region, until 2003 when a tendency was noticed of offenses appearing in other localities throughout Southern Norway, in 2003 the person is alleged to have been both at Quality Hotel and Badeland in Sarpsborg. Two incidents took place on 13 July 2002 in Sarons dal in Kvinesdal Municipality and at Hamresanden camping in Kristiansand Municipality on 12 July 2003.

In January 2005 another incident took place in Sauda Municipality, whereas an incident involving two victims took place in a swimming hall in Skjolden on 14 July 2006. In October 2007 it became known that also Swedish police were investigating whether "The Pocket Man" was behind an offense at Svinesund.

== Investigation ==
=== Separate investigations before coordination ===
Police in Norway currently lack a centralized computer system which is able to reveal similarities between individual cases. "The Pocket Man's" offenses against young boys had all been registered as independent cases. Just by accident, an investigator discovered in 2003 there were several conjoined cases.

The police in Ski Municipality outside Oslo were given the task of initiating a more comprehensive investigation of the itinerant serial criminal in 2003. They began a cumbersome re-evaluation of the 70 registered cases from other police districts. The Ski police discovered that the evidence was basically quite flimsy, there was for instance a lack of such essentials as interrogations. In May 2004 the police were nowhere near a solution to the case, and the investigation was at that time closed down.

A new team which will be working exclusively on "The Pocket Man" was established in the first two weeks of 2008 in Bergen, where investigators believe the entire case may have begun. During the same period new tips arrived for this team of previously undisclosed incidents.

==== DNA evidence ====
Police secured genetic fingerprinting of several crime scenes, including one incident in Trondheim, where "The Pocket Man" had been photographed by a surveillance camera on 6 September 2003. DNA testing also showed that "The Bandage Man" and "The Pocket Man" were the same person.

A DNA sample located in the Norwegian Institute of Forensic Medicine taken of biological matter from a sexual offense case in 1995 revealed through a renewed analysis in 2007 that the sample originated from "The Pocket Man". Technically it was unfeasible to analyse the evidence in 1995, but it was stored for later analyses.

==== Tips and named suspects ====
In connection with two incidents, one in Moss in 1995, and one in Bergen in 1997, "The Pocket Man" himself stated that, "I am from Moss". National Criminal Investigation Service believed in October 2007 that several named men from Oslo or Eastern Norway could possibly be "The Pocket Man". In connection with an incident in July 1999 at Nattland, "The Pocket Man" however used an expression typical of the Bergen region, and Kripos obtained DNA samples from four individuals from the Bergen area in the autumn of 2007.

=== Apprehension ===
Early in the morning of 11 January 2008, in Bergen, the police apprehended the man whom they believe to be "The Pocket Man". A previously unpunished man in his fifties was apprehended. The man was taken subsequent to a DNA match. The police announced that the man has left DNA evidence in five cases, and they have identified him via a video recording. On 14 January a court ruled that he would be placed in detention for four weeks with mail and visitors control restrictions. His defense attorney at that time was Tor Erling Staff. Information about the suspect that was later published states that he is a multi-millionaire and that he has two children.

Before the apprehension, a secret search was conducted in the person's house. One precondition for such a procedure is the offense has a punishment limit of more than 10 years. Because the Norwegian criminal code equates oral sex and intercourse, the case has a punishment limit of 21 years, and hence the police were able to conduct a secret search.

During later searches, the police allowed journalists to photograph impounded material from the house of the charged individual.

== Trial ==
=== Change of lawyer ===
In early May 2008, it was reported that the suspect had replaced his lawyer. His former lawyer, Tor Erling Staff, had advised him not to talk to the police. His new lawyer, Gunhild Lærum, recently defended a teacher of similar crimes, and in that case the defendant gave a full explanation of his doings.

=== Conclusion of investigation ===
Norwegian police rounded up their investigation in May 2009. Until then, the detained suspect had been charged with 54 cases of sexual assault and attempted sexual assault; however, this number was raised with an unmentioned number at that time. He has admitted to involvement in 20 cases. The suspect who has been detained throughout the investigation will remain in custody until at least the end of August 2009. He has consistently agreed to prolonged detention to avoid being hounded by the news media should he have been released before the trial.

=== Swedish cases uncovered ===
In June 2009, Swedish police announced that they had identified two unsolved abuse cases which they believe could be tied to the Pocket Man. The assaults took place in the town of Varberg on the west coast in May 2004. The detained suspect has been charged with one of those assaults. The parents of the other boy have requested that their son not be included in the charges to spare him from further police questioning.

=== Conviction ===
Andersen was convicted on 14 June 2010 on most of the 74 charges, most related to the sexual abuse charges and six related to violations of the weapons regulations. He was sentenced to nine years confinement; such sentences can be extended by five years at a time if deemed necessary, and can in principle become a life sentence. Andersen was acquitted on one of the two rape charges, although the court found that Andersen was still guilty of abuse in that incident.

Andersen was also ordered to pay between NOK 20,000 and NOK 125,000 to each of his victims, in total NOK 2,525,000. He was also ordered to cover court costs totalling NOK 500,000.

== See also ==
- List of serial rapists
