= Georg Fredrik Rieber-Mohn =

Norwegian judge (born 1945)

Georg Fredrik Rieber-Mohn (born 13 August 1945) is a Norwegian judge.

He was born in Lillehammer, and graduated as cand.jur. from the University of Oslo in 1969.

He worked as a secretary from 1969, and as a prison administrator from 1971. In 1974 he was hired in the Ministry of Justice and the Police as a researcher. After a period as auxiliary judge from 1975 to 1976 and district attorney from 1976 to 1980, both in Stavanger, he returned to the Ministry of Justice in 1980 as deputy under-secretary of State. In 1985 he left to be a presiding judge in Eidsivating. In 1986 he was appointed as Norwegian Director of Public Prosecutions, as the youngest to date. From 1997 to 2007 he served as a Supreme Court Justice. After this he returned to the Ministry of Justice.

In 2011 Rieber-Mohn became chairman (styreleder) of the Fritt Ord Foundation. Previously he was the deputy leader of the foundation.

== Transportation without paying and the following media coverage ==
"20 years" before 2011, he was reported to have said "You do see who I am", when confronted with not having a ticket while riding on public transportation, one time that he and other passengers were being checked regarding valid tickets. The quote and the incident were mentioned in Verdens Gang, Dagbladet, and Aftenposten. And in a TV-program the quote and the incident were discussed (by Olav Hestenes and Ole Paus), while a picture of Rieber-Mohns was continuously televised together with a "rolling text": "This man is a trikkesniker — this man is a trikkesniker — this man is a trikkesniker". In 2011, Rieber-Mohn said that the TV-program made him "deeply unhappy".

Legal offices
Preceded by Magnar Flornes	Norwegian Director of Public Prosecutions; 1986–1997	Succeeded by Tor-Aksel Busch
