= Jørn Sigurd Maurud =

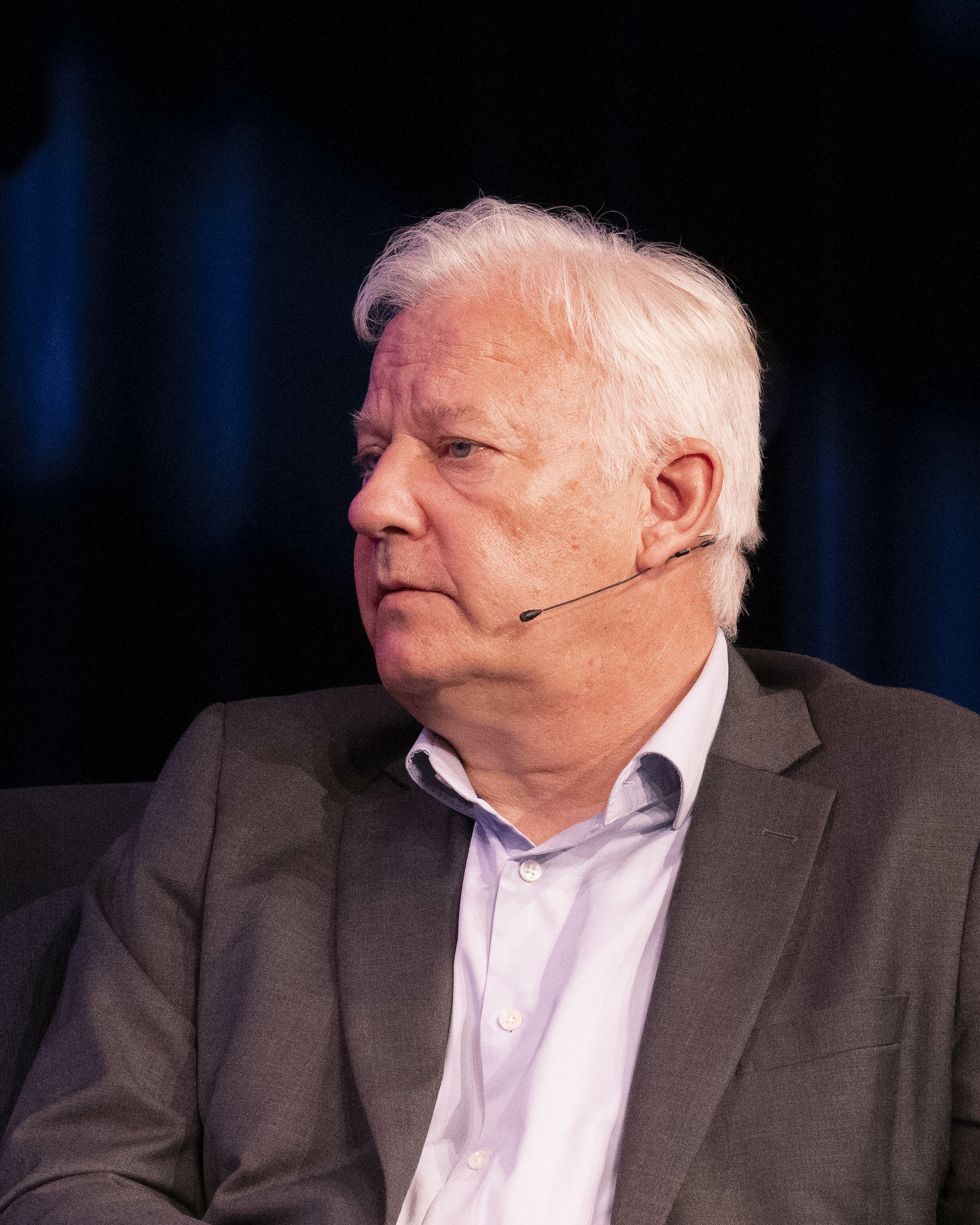
- Maurud in May, 2023
- Born: 8 April 1960 (age 66)
- Education: University of Oslo
- Occupations: Jurist and civil servant
- Partner: Hanne Bjurstrøm

Jørn Sigurd Maurud (born 8 April 1960) is a Norwegian jurist. He is Director of Public Prosecutions from 1 November 2019.

== Career ==
Maurud graduated as cand.jur. from the University of Oslo in 1987. He has been assigned with the Ministry of Foreign Affairs, Nord-Hedmark District Court, the law company Wikborg, Rein & Co., and the Supreme Court. From 1995 to 2010 he was a public prosecutor in Eidsivating. He was prosecutor in the widely media-covered Orderud case. From 2010 he was State's attorney in Oslo. In 2019 he was appointed as Norwegian Director of Public Prosecutions, effective from 1 November, succeeding Tor-Aksel Busch. At the time of his appointment, Maurud recused from handling of the so-called NAV scandal, due to his relationship to former Minister of Labour and Social Inclusion Hanne Bjurstrøm.

Legal offices
Preceded by Tor-Aksel Busch	Norwegian Director of Public Prosecutions; 2019–	Succeeded by incumbent
