= Stavanger Prison =

Prison in Stavanger, Norway

Coordinates: 58°59′36.83″N 5°39′26.64″E

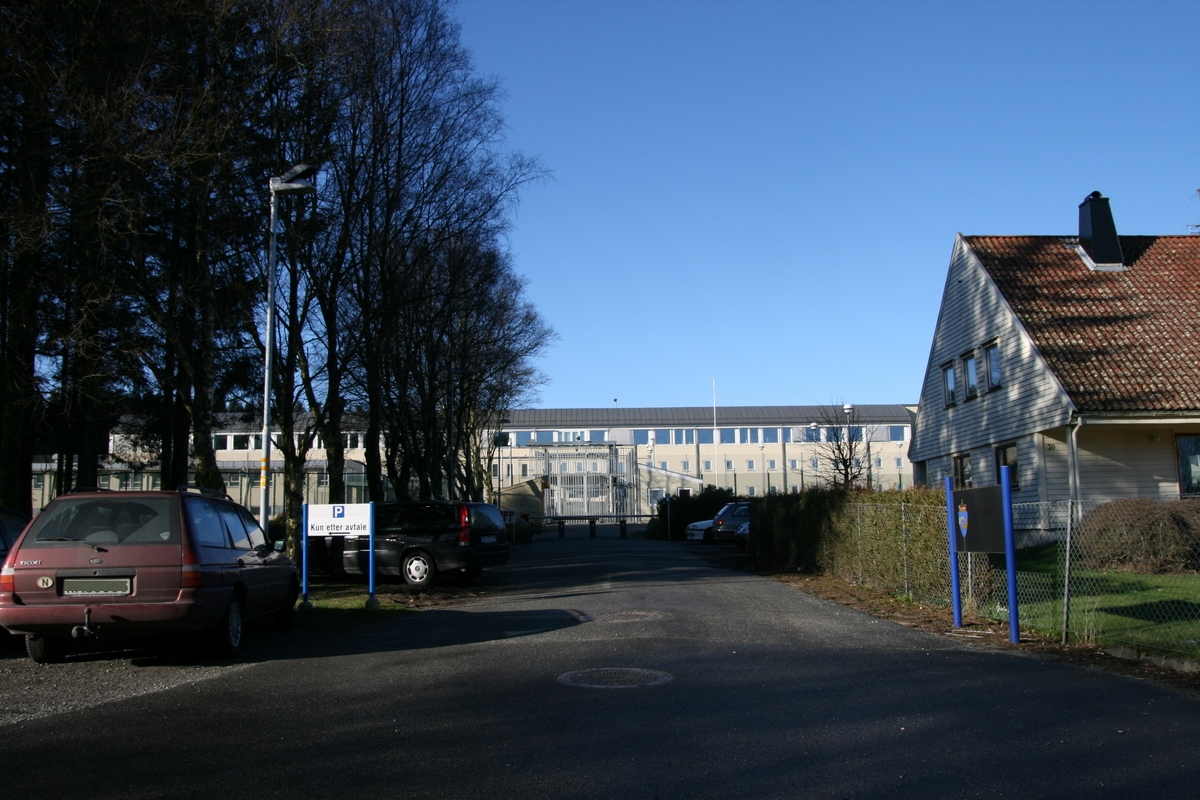
Stavanger Prison in 2008

Stavanger Prison (Norwegian: Stavanger fengsel) is a prison, located in Stavanger, Norway The prison was opened in its present form in 2001. The building was then renovated and replaced the former Stavanger Prison which was completed in 1963.

Stavanger Prison a capacity of 71 in 4 compartments for all categories of prisoners. The inmates are still in police custody or serving sentences. The prison has separate departments for women and a special department to solve problems with drugs and alcohol.

The prison belongs to the Southwestern Region of the Norwegian Correctional Services.
