= Tor-Aksel Busch =

Norwegian jurist

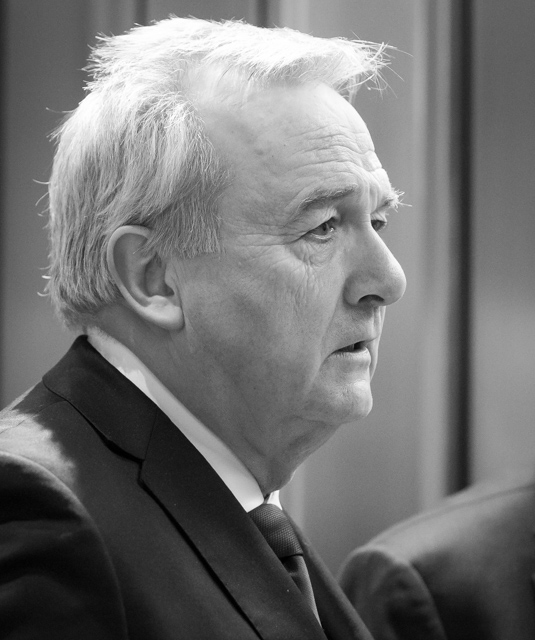
- Born: 17 March 1950 (age 75); Oslo, Norway
- Occupation(s): jurist and civil servant
- Awards: Norwegian Police Cross of Honour (2019)

Tor-Aksel Busch (born 17 March 1950) is a Norwegian lawyer and government official. He served as Director of Public Prosecutions from 1997 to 2019.

== Career ==
Born in Oslo on 17 March 1950, Busch graduated as a lawyer (cand.jur.) from the University of Oslo in 1974. From 1981 to 1987 he was a public prosecutor in Eidsivating, and from 1987 to 1997 assistant director of public prosecutions.

In 1997 he was appointed as Norwegian Director of Public Prosecutions, succeeding Georg Fredrik Rieber-Mohn. As director, he continued his predecessor's focus on environmental crimes and on cases on occupational safety and health. He also expressed that the solved number of cases on violence against women was too low. Busch retired on 31 October 2019. During his career he prosecuted 138 cases for the Supreme Court. At the time of his retirement, he was the longest-serving director of prosecution in Norway. He was succeeded by Jørn Sigurd Maurud.

His last week as Director of Public Prosecutions was dominated by starting cleanup after it was revealed that a years-long unlawful practice by the Norwegian Labour and Welfare Administration had effected thousands of clients, including a number of fraud cases based on wrong premises.

== Awards ==
Busch was the first recipient of the Rights Prize (Rettighetsprisen) in 2014, which he received for his work combating domestic violence. He was awarded the Norwegian Police Cross of Honour in 2019. He was also awarded the Norwegian Association of Lawyers' Rettssikkerhetsprisen (Rule of Law Prize) in 2019 and the Stine Sofie's Foundation's Children's Rights Prize (Barnerettsprisen) in 2020. In 2021 he became a commander of the Order of St. Olav, Norway's highest honor.

Legal offices
Preceded by Georg Fredrik Rieber-Mohn	Norwegian Director of Public Prosecutions; 1997–2019	Succeeded by Jørn Sigurd Maurud
