= Norwegian Prosecuting Authority =

Body responsible for legal prosecutions in Norway

Norwegian Prosecuting Authority (Norwegian: Påtalemyndigheten) is a body subordinate to the Norwegian Council of State.

This body is responsible for legal prosecutions in Norway. It is divided into three levels. The third level of the Prosecuting Authority is the Police. The first two, the Office of the Director of Public Prosecutions and the Public Prosecutors, are called "the Higher Prosecuting Authority" (Norwegian: Den høyere påtalemyndighet). Public Prosecutors work on a regional basis, whereas the Director of Public Prosecutions (Norwegian: Riksadvokat) has the coordinative leadership. When Tor-Aksel Busch resigned on 31 October 2019 he was the longest serving Riksadvokat in Norway's history.

== Directors of Public Prosecutions ==
This is a list of the Directors of Public Prosecutions:

- 1889–1901 : Bernhard Getz
- 1901–1904 : Johan Blackstad (acting since 1891)
- 1904–1911 : Harald Smedal (acting since 1904)
- 1911–1929 : Peder Kjerschow
- 1929–1940 : Haakon Sund
- 1941–1945 : Jørgen Nordvik (collaborator during the German occupation of Norway)
- 1945–1946 : Sven Arntzen (acting)
- 1946–1967 : Andreas Aulie
- 1968–1979 : Lauritz J. Dorenfeldt
- 1979–1986 : Magnar Flornes
- 1986–1997 : Georg Fredrik Rieber-Mohn
- 1997–2019: Tor-Aksel Busch
- 2019–present : Jørn Sigurd Maurud

== See also ==
- National Authority for Prosecution of Organised and Other Serious Crime
