= Julio Kopseng =

Norwegian dancer and serial rapist

Julio Petter Kopseng, also known as Julio Gonzales, (born 10 June 1977) is a Colombian-born Norwegian former dancer and convicted serial rapist, sentenced to 21 years imprisonment for raping 18 women, as well as abusing and attempting to rape a former cohabitant. His sentence is the harshest penalty ever given for a rape case in the country.

== Life and work ==
Kopseng was born in Colombia, but was adopted as a five-year-old by a Norwegian couple in 1982. He grew up in the Oslo neighborhood of Grefsen.

As an adult, Kopseng made his living as a dancer, and was well known in Oslo's dancing community. Among other things, he appeared on the NRK Super children's channel and in the TV 2 talent show Norske Talenter. He has also worked as a photographer and stripper, as well as disseminating artistics assignments on the internet.

== Crimes ==
The first report against Kopseng came in July 2001, when he was 24 years old. In the years that followed, there were several other reports against him; some victims gave his real name to police, while others used his aliases 'Inferno' ( which he used as a stripper) and 'Julio Gonzalez' (which he used as a photographer). However, the police couldn't trace these names back to Kopseng, all the first six rape reports were dropped for lack of evidence.

On 25 April 2013, Kopseng was convicted by the Oslo District Court for three rapes that had taken place in autumn 2008 and August 2009. He was sentenced to four years imprisonment, two of which were suspended. At the time, the court considered that there little danger of recidivism, and released him pending an appeal. In the summer of 2013, there was a new allegation against Kopseng, this time from a British woman to whom he offered a free homestay via CouchSurfing. Her report was a turning point in the investigation, and after this, Kopseng was taken into custody. When his case was presented before the Court of Appeal, he was acquitted of a third charge, but convicted of two other rapes.

While serving his sentence, he was tried in court again after he was accused of many rapes between 2001 and 2013. After some media outlets and websites started to mention him by name and shared his pictures, referring to Kopseng as a potential serial rapist, more and more women began contacting the police to report their experiences with him. Many of these rapes took place in connection with his job as a mediator of artistic assignments. Julio would lure the victims with job offers for movies and music videos, drugging and raping them during the job interviews. Among his victims were a female colleague and his cohabitant. Kopseng was convicted on all charges before the Oslo District Court in February 2015, but appealed the verdict. The appeal case started in January 2016 before the Borgarting Court of Appeal, and by the end of it, he was sentenced to 21 years imprisonment with a minimum term of 10 years, the most severe penalty for a rape case in the country's history. In connection to the trial, the police referred to Kopseng as "Norway's most active serial rapist".

In 2017, he was charged with raping two more women and convicted two years later, but no new sentence was imposed on him, as he was already serving the highest penalty available.

== Bibliography ==
- Monica Flatabø (10 September 2018). Such a girl: a documentary about rape (in Norwegian). Vigmostad Bjørke. ISBN 9788241915741.

== See also ==
- Marius Borg Høiby
