= Helicopter doctor case =

Norwegian child sexual abuse case in 2010

Thor Aage Mathisen
- Born: 24 February 1972 (age 54)
- Occupation: None. Former physician.
- Status: Released on parole in 2018 after serving over 7 years
- Conviction: Child sexual abuse
- Penalty: Preventive detention with a term target of 10 years and a mandatory minimum term of 7 years

The Helicopter doctor case (Norwegian: Helikopterlege-saken) was a case of child sexual abuse in Norway that received broad media attention from 2010 to 2012. A physician from Hamar, Thor Aage Mathisen (born 1972), was arrested in October 2010 and charged with sexually abusing several underage girls, including 7 cases of rape, and of blackmailing a number of men. At the time, he worked as a consultant at Innlandet Hospital and worked part-time as a helicopter doctor. He thus became known in the media as "the helicopter doctor." In 2011, he was convicted by Hedmarken District Court and again by Eidsivating Court of Appeal to 10 years preventive detention, to pay his victims 2,4 million NOK and deprived of his medical authorization ("struck off") on an indefinite basis. In March 2012 the Supreme Court of Norway rejected to hear his appeal. He served his sentence between 2011 and 2018, mostly in the high security Ila Detention and Security Prison outside Oslo, later in the Kroksrud Penal Labour Camp at Kløfta, and was released on probation in 2018 after serving over 7 years.

During the trial, Mathisen was diagnosed by the court-appointed experts, psychiatrist Michael Setsaas and psychologist Jim Aage Nøttestad, with paedophilia and antisocial personality disorder with sadomasochistic traits. According to the experts, he will need treatment for up to 20 years for his diagnoses.

Mathisen didn't get accepted by a medical school in Norway, and studied medicine abroad.
