= Stine Sofie's Foundation =

Norwegian children's rights organization

- Founded: 11 August 2009
- Founder: Ada Sofie Austegard; Bente Bergseth
- Type: Educational and support charity
- Purpose: Prevention and uncovering of child abuse and violence towards children.
- Location: Grimstad
- Region served: Norway
- Product: Education, advice, helpline, books
- Key people: Ada Sofie Austegard
- Endowment: $300.000
- Employees: 7
- Website: stinesofiesstiftelse.no

Stine Sofie's Foundation (Norwegian: Stine Sofies Stiftelse) is a Norway-based children's rights charity formed to give support to victims of child abuse or other forms of violence towards children. It also works towards assisting the abused child and their relatives, as well as campaigning and influencing the authorities to strengthen the rule of law and due process for children on a national level.

It is named after Stine Sofie Sørstrønen, one of the victims of the notorious Baneheia child murders in May 2000.
