= Botsfengselet =

Prison in Oslo, Norway

Coordinates: 59°54′34″N 10°46′18″E

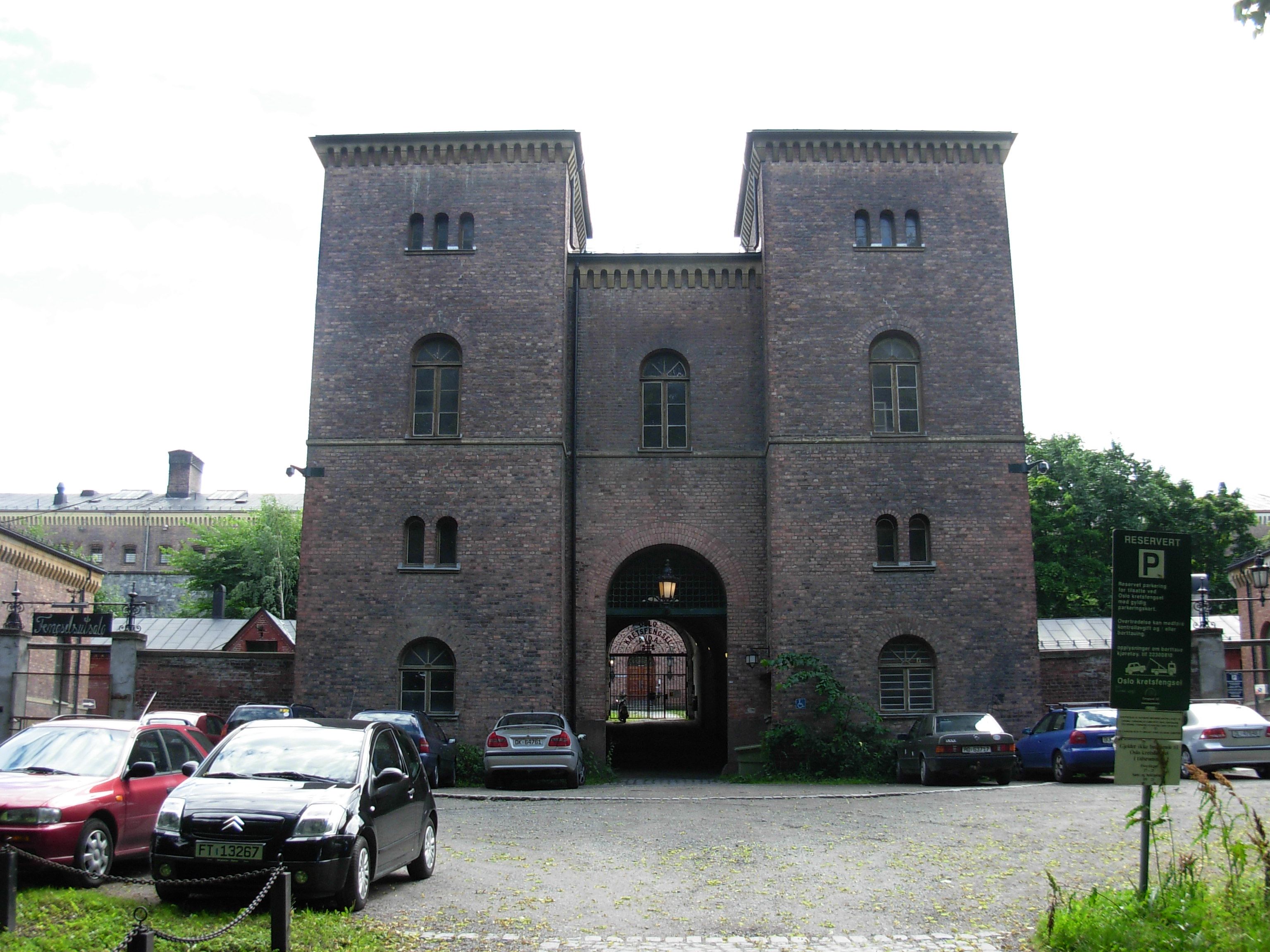
Main entrance

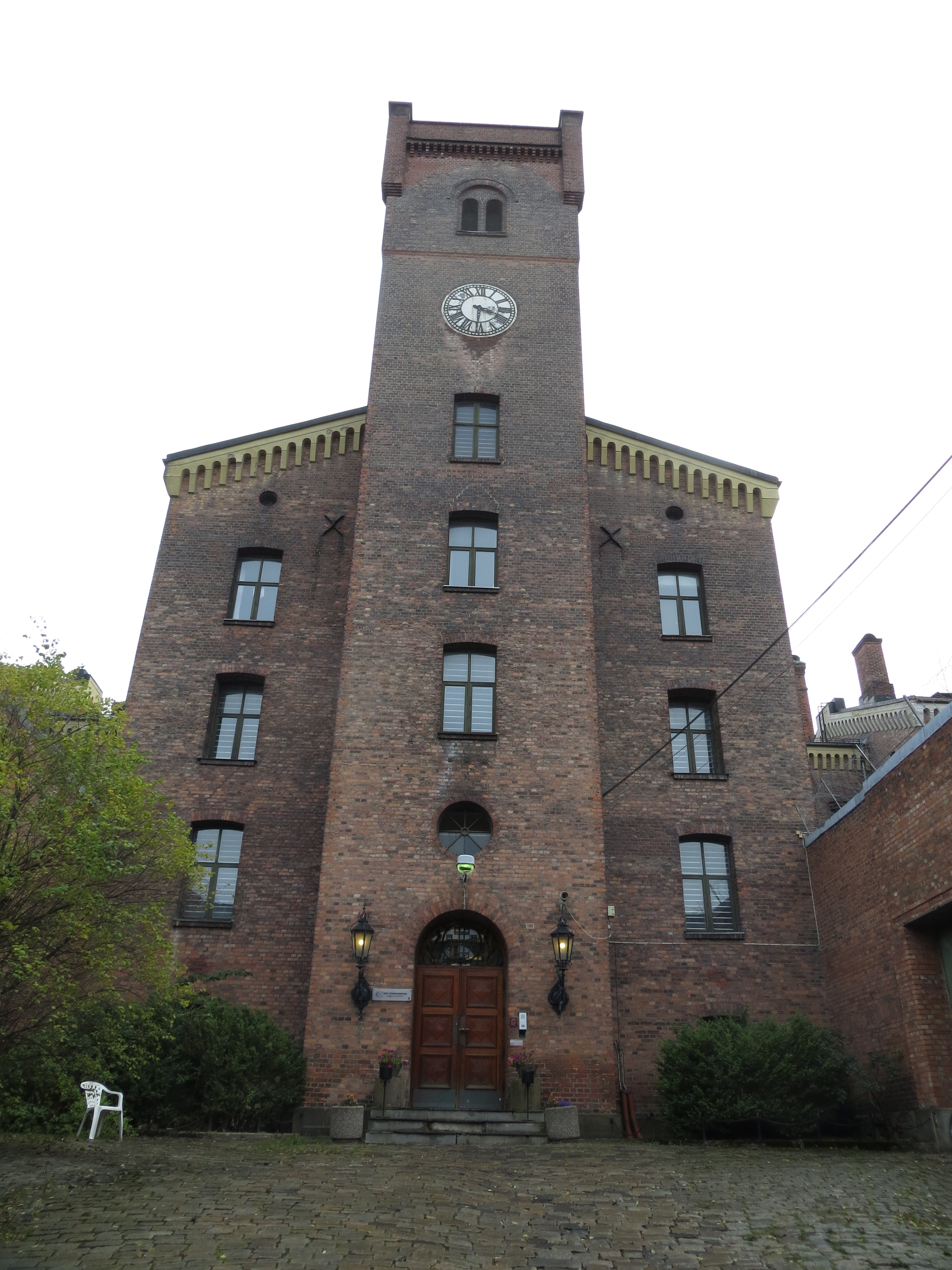
Botsfengselet

Botsfengselet is a former national prison for long-term prisoners located in Oslo, Norway, at the former Åkebergløkka, Grønlandsleiret 41.

The prison was designed by Heinrich Ernst Schirmer and was built starting in 1844, coming into use in 1851. The prison chapel was designed by architect Jacob Wilhelm Nordan and came into use in 1887.

In 1970, Ullersmo Prison took over as the prison for long-term prisoners in Norway, and Botsfengselet was rehabilitated to serve as a department of the district prison in Oslo (Norwegian: Oslo Kretsfengsel) starting from 1975. The prison is listed as a protected site.

== See also ==
- Oslo Prison
