= Ila Detention and Security Prison =

Prison in Bærum, Norway

Coordinates: 59°57′19.71″N 10°35′2.67″E

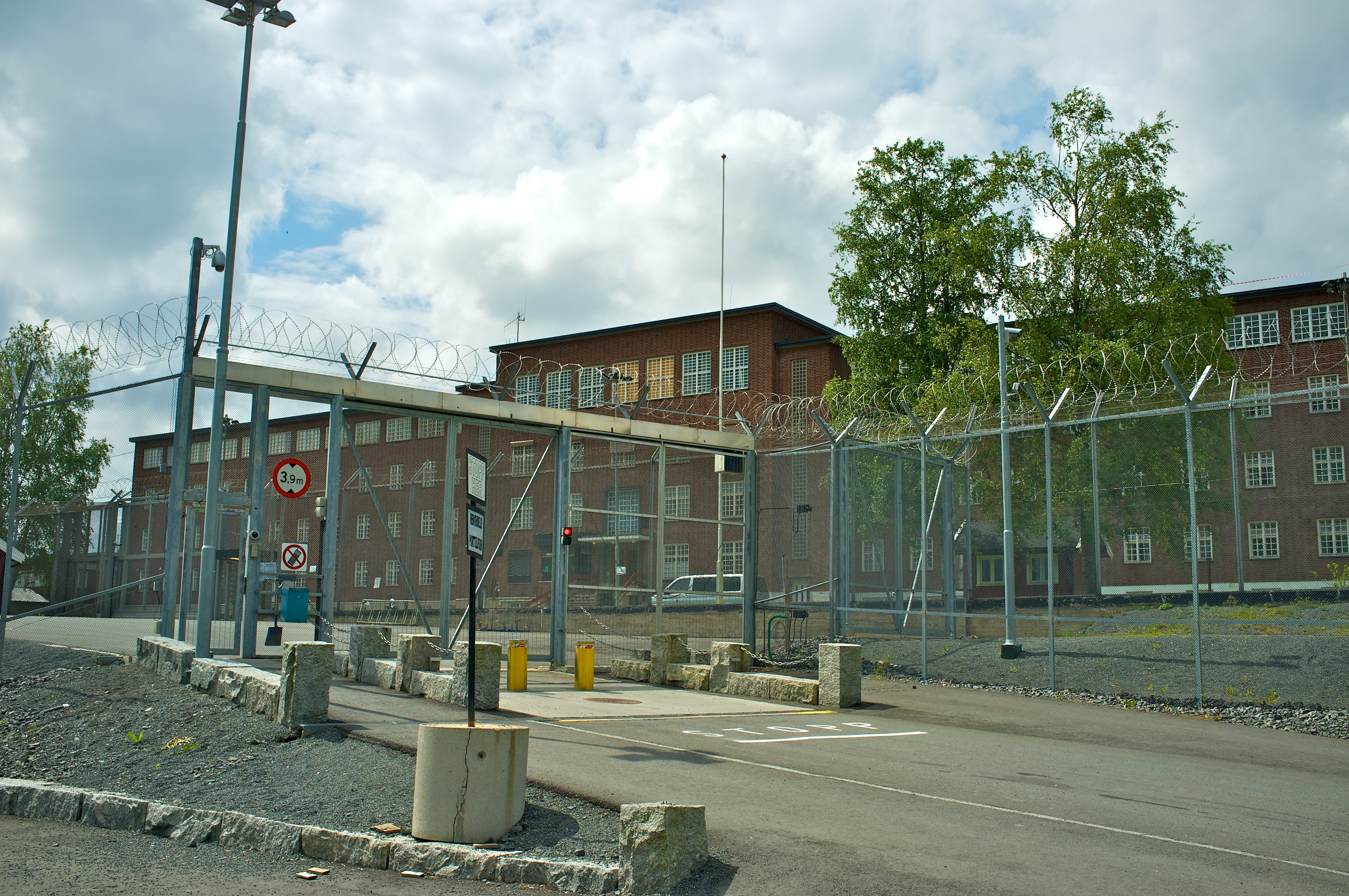
The main building

Ila prison and detention center (Norwegian: Ila fengsel og forvaringsanstalt) is a high security prison in Ila in Bærum municipality in Akershus county, outside the capital city of Oslo in Norway. It is the national preventive detention facility for men in Norway, i.e. the prison for men serving preventive detention (forvaring), Norway's maximum penalty. Ila generally houses the most dangerous criminals in Norway, who are convicted of violent and sexual crimes.

Organisations within the facility

- Nasjonal forsterket fellesskapsavdeling (as of 2023).

== History ==
The facility was mostly built in the period from 1937 to 1939 and was completed in 1940 when Norway was attacked and occupied by Nazi Germany in World War II. The prison was used to house Grini Prison Camp. The prison mainly housed Norwegians who were in political opposition during World War II.

After the war it changed its name to Ilebu prison and on 8 May 1945 became a camp for prisoners, held in custody and judged traitors from World War II. From 1951, Ila supervision unit was used for prisoners who were sentenced to detention in addition to prison punishment. From 1976 to 2000, the prison was called Ila landsfengsel og sikringsanstalt. The prison has about 130 prisoners.

Ila Detention and Security Prison changed its name in 2002. Ila was given a role as a detention institution for men in Norway, and changed its name in Norwegian to Ila fengsel, forvarings- og sikringsanstalt, later Ila fengsel og forvarigsanstalt.

== Ila today ==
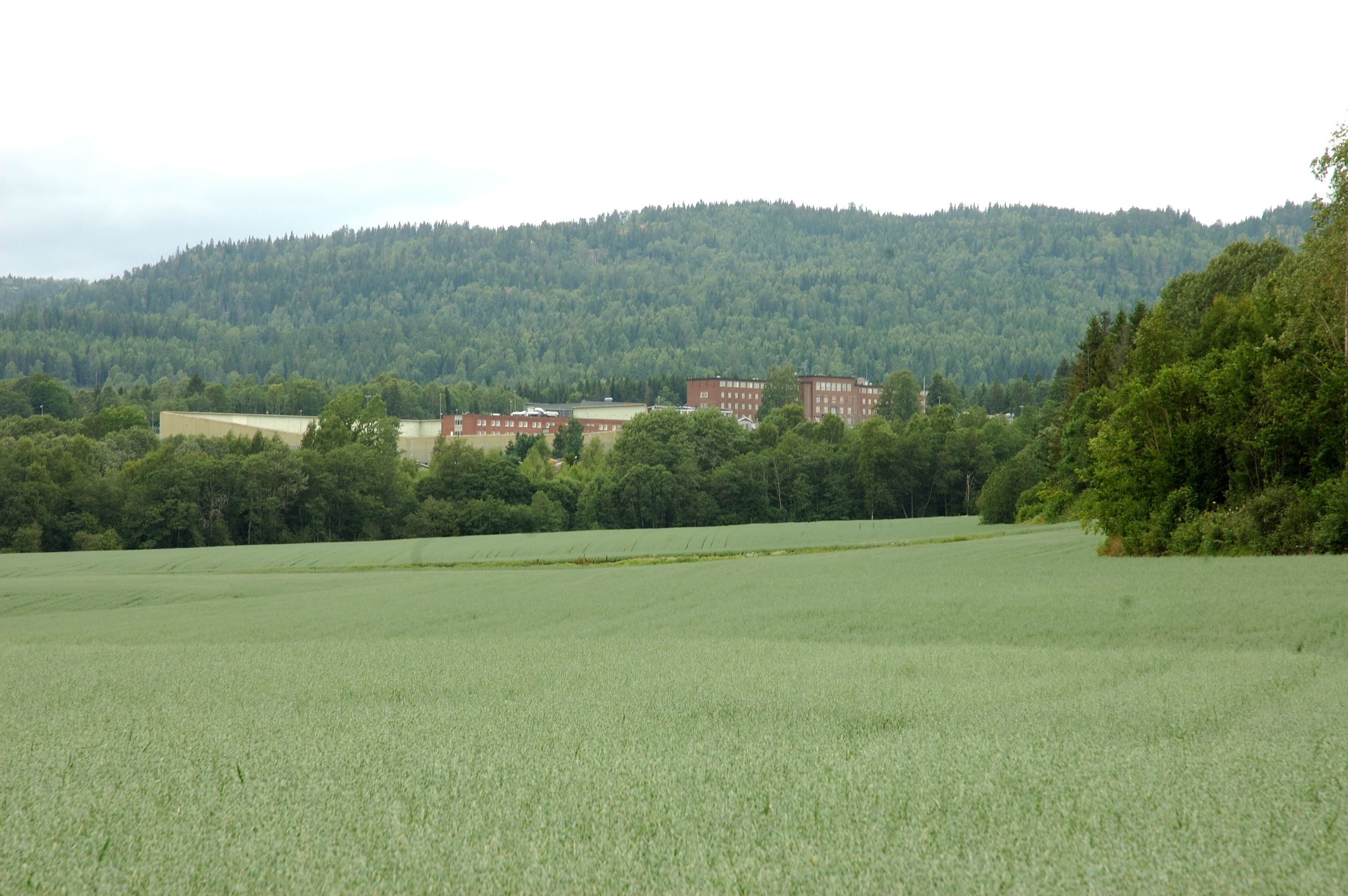
Ila Detention and Security Prison

The prison went through an extensive remodeling inside and can now hold 124 prisoners in twelve wings or departments. Some of the most dangerous criminals in Norway, convicted of violent and sexual crimes, are prisoners at Ila.

Anders Behring Breivik, convicted for the 2011 Norway attacks, has been imprisoned in Ila for much of the time since he was arrested on 22 July 2011. Other notable prisoners are Varg Vikernes, Philip Manshaus, Thor Aage Mathisen and Viggo Kristiansen.

The Soviet spy Arne Treholt, who was convicted of treason in 1985, was incarcerated at Ila from 1985 to 1986.

== See also ==
- Norwegian Correctional Service
