= Ullersmo Prison =

Prison in Ullensaker, Norway

Coordinates: 60.0705°N 11.1420°E

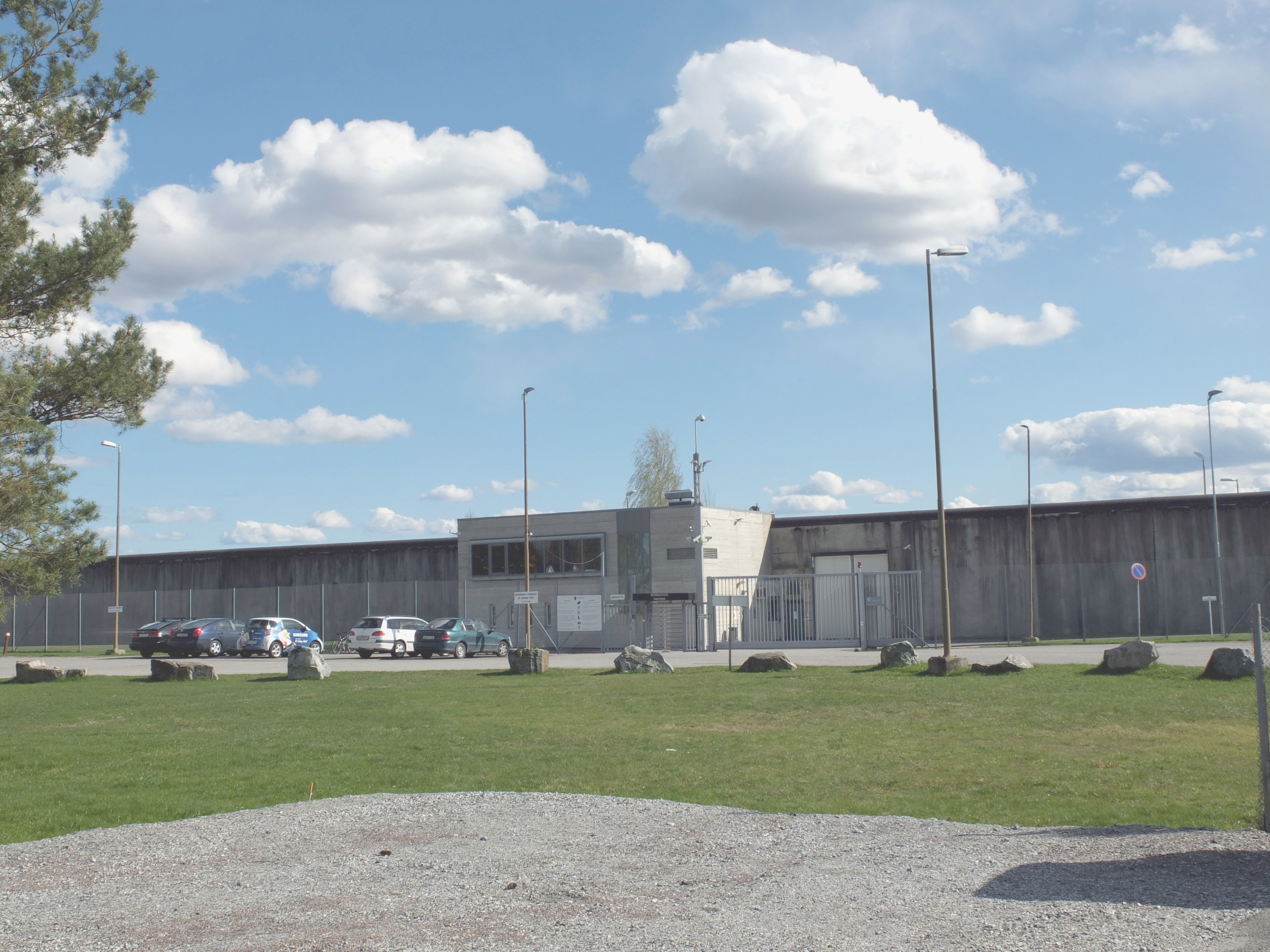
Prison entrance

Ullersmo Prison (Norwegian: Ullersmo fengsel) is a prison in Ullensaker, Akershus. It was opened in 1970. The prison was intended as a replacement for the Botsfengselet in Oslo. It is used for long term prisoners from the whole of Norway, and has room for 205 inmates. The prison contains a sick ward, mechanic and carpentry workshops as well as a school.

== Governors ==
- Knut Eigum (1989-1999)
- Ellen C. Bjercke (1999-2010)
- Tom A. Enger (2010-2014)
