= Oslo Prison =

Prison in Norway

Coordinates: 59°54′34″N 10°46′24″E

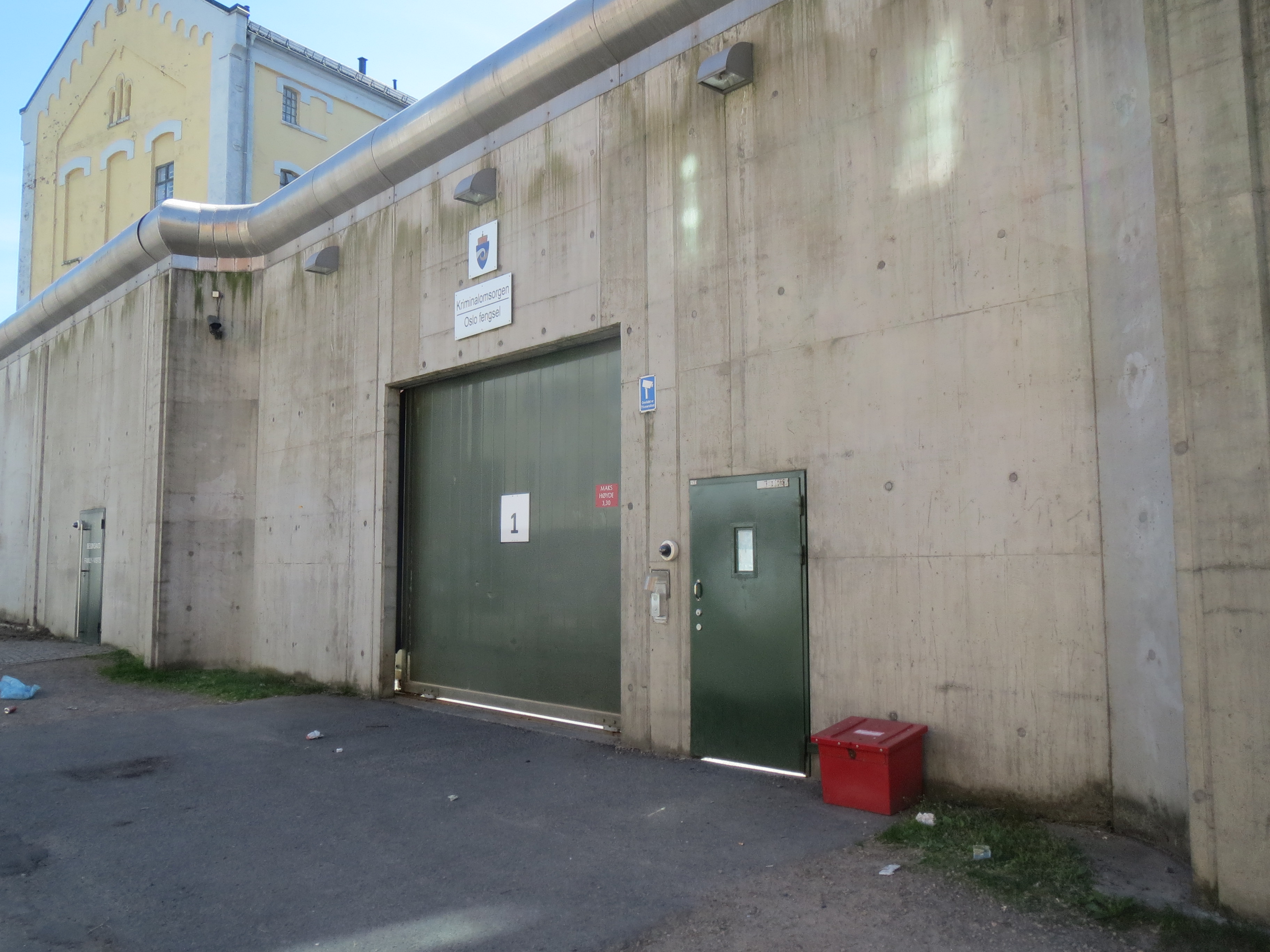
Oslo Prison, entrance department B

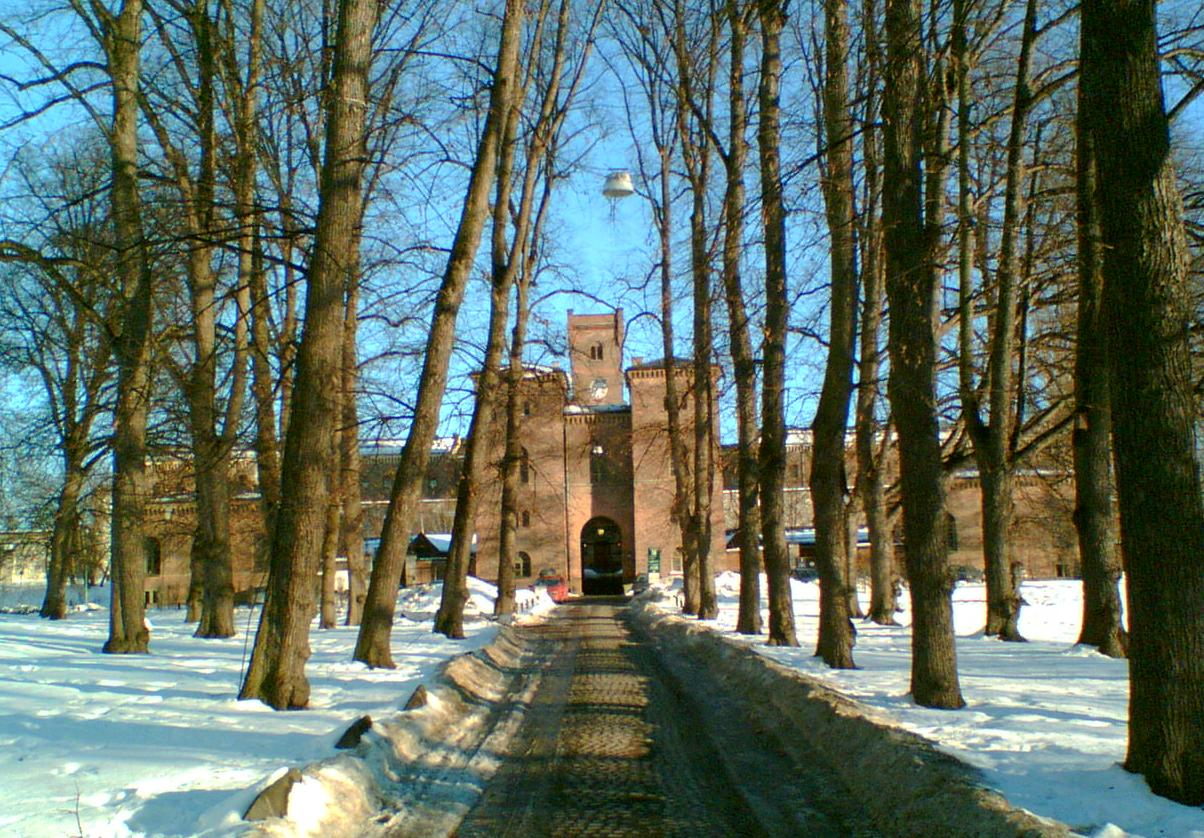
The entrance to department A, of Oslo Prison. That department has been closed since 2017

Oslo Prison (Norwegian: Oslo fengsel) is the district prison of Oslo, Norway. It is the largest prison in Norway, with a capacity of around 350 detainees. The prison was called Oslo kretsfengsel until 2001. The prison has several departments. Department A is the former Botsfengselet, Grønlandsleiret 41, popularly called "Botsen". Department B is a former brewery located in Åkebergveien 11, popularly called "Bayer'n". Department C, called "Stifinner'n", is located in the former prison hospital at Åkebergveien, and is designated for prisoners with drug problems.

== Notable inmates ==
- Marius Borg Høiby, his 4-week jail term lasts until March 2, 2026; his trial will be over in lower court, later that month.
