= 22 July (film) =

2018 Norwegian film by Paul Greengrass

- Official poster
- Directed by: Paul Greengrass
- Screenplay by: Paul Greengrass
- Based on: One of Us: The Story of a Massacre in Norway — and Its Aftermath by Åsne Seierstad
- Produced by: Scott Rudin; Eli Bush; Gregory Goodman; Paul Greengrass
- Starring: Anders Danielsen Lie; Jon Øigarden
- Cinematography: Pål Ulvik Rokseth
- Edited by: William Goldenberg
- Music by: Sune Martin
- Production company: Scott Rudin Productions
- Distributed by: Netflix
- Release dates: September 5, 2018 (Venice); October 10, 2018 (United States)
- Running time: 143 minutes
- Countries: Norway; United Kingdom
- Language: English
- Budget: $20 million
- Box office: $3.7 million

22 July is a 2018 crime drama film about the 2011 Norway attacks and their aftermath, based on the book One of Us: The Story of a Massacre in Norway — and Its Aftermath by Åsne Seierstad. A bilateral co-production between Norway and the United Kingdom, the film was written, directed and produced by British filmmaker Paul Greengrass and features a Norwegian cast and crew. It stars Anders Danielsen Lie, Jon Øigarden, Thorbjørn Harr, Jonas Strand Gravli, Ola G. Furuseth, Ulrikke Hansen Døvigen, Isak Bakli Aglen, Maria Bock, and Seda Witt. The film had its world premiere on September 5, 2018, in the main competition section of the 75th Venice International Film Festival, and was released online and in select theaters on October 10, 2018, by Netflix.

== Plot ==
On July 22, 2011, Anders Behring Breivik dresses in a police uniform, loads a van with home-made explosives, and drives to Regjeringskvartalet, the executive government quarter in Oslo, Norway. He leaves the van outside the office of Prime Minister Jens Stoltenberg. Moments later, it explodes, causing several casualties.

On the island of Utøya in Tyrifjorden, Buskerud, teenagers have arrived for a Workers' Youth League (AUF) summer camp, organised by the ruling Labour Party. When they learn of the bombing, one student, Viljar Hanssen, calls his parents to make sure they are unhurt.

Breivik arrives at the ferry landing and informs staff that he is a police officer, sent to secure the island following the attack in Oslo. The camp director transports him to the island by boat. Breivik instructs the staff to gather the children in one location. When the head of security asks for ID, Breivik shoots him and the director dead. The children flee as Breivik opens fire, murdering dozens.

Viljar and his brother Torje hide on a rocky embankment on the beach. Viljar calls his mother to tell her a shooting is in progress. Breivik finds the group and starts shooting. Viljar is shot multiple times, but Torje escapes unharmed. Breivik surrenders to a tactical team, and is brought inland for interrogation.

Breivik claims he is the leader of a white nationalist group called the Knights Templar and that more attacks will happen on his signal. He requests the aid of lawyer Geir Lippestad, who defended a Neo-Nazi. Lippestad is morally conscientious of his client and professionally bonded by his ethics as a lawyer. Lippestad tries to argue an insanity defense for Breivik, which draws criticism as it means he will be institutionalized instead of imprisoned. With the help of various psychiatrists and psychologists, Breivik is initially diagnosed with paranoid schizophrenia. Breivik tells Lippestad he wants to be declared competent to legitimize his attacks.

Viljar wakes from a coma with life-changing injuries and returns home with his family. He learns to walk again, but is haunted by memories of the attack. With the support of his mother, and another survivor of the attack on Utøya, he appears in court as a witness and delivers an account of the massacre. Breivik is sentenced to 21 years, that can be extended by a court if it is deemed he is still a danger to society.

== Cast ==
- Anders Danielsen Lie as Anders Behring Breivik
- Jon Øigarden as Geir Lippestad
- Thorbjørn Harr as Sveinn Are Hanssen
- Jonas Strand Gravli as Viljar Hanssen
- Ola G. Furuseth as Jens Stoltenberg
- Ulrikke Hansen Døvigen as Inga Bejer Engh
- Isak Bakli Aglen as Torje Hanssen
- Maria Bock as Christin Kristoffersen
- Tone Danielsen as Judge Wenche Arntzen
- Turid Gunnes as Mette Larsen
- Monica Borg Fure as Monica Bøsei
- Ingrid Enger Damon as Alexandra Bech Gjørv
- Seda Witt as Lara Rashid
- Anja Maria Svenkerud as Siv Hallgren
- Hasse Lindmo as Svein Holden

== Production ==
On August 21, 2017, Paul Greengrass announced that he was working on a new Netflix movie focused on the 2011 Norway attacks and aftermath. The production began at the end of 2017. The trailer of the film was released on 4 September 2018. Greengrass revealed that he used Norwegian actors and crew for the film, because he considered that the film should be identified like a Norwegian film. He also revealed that he didn't use the Norwegian language for the film, because he didn't speak Norwegian, so he looked for actors who can speak English.

== Release ==
The film had its world premiere at the 75th Venice International Film Festival on 5 September 2018. The film was also screened at the Toronto International Film Festival on 10 September 2018, it also had a special presentation in Scandinavian theaters on 4 October 2018. The film was released on 10 October 2018 on Netflix and in select theaters. It was originally scheduled to be released on 2 November 2018, under the title Norway.

=== Critical response ===
On review aggregator Rotten Tomatoes, the film holds an approval rating of 81%, based on 127 reviews, with an average rating of 6.9/10. The website's critical consensus reads, "22 July offers a hard-hitting close-up look at the aftereffects of terrorism, telling a story with a thriller's visceral impact and the lingering emotional resonance of a drama." On Metacritic, the film has a weighted average score of 69 out of 100, based on 27 critics, indicating "generally favorable" reviews.

== See also ==
- Seconds From Disaster season 6: "Norway Massacre: I Was There" (airdate July 22, 2012)
- Utøya: July 22 (2018), a Norwegian drama film directed by Erik Poppe
