= Trial of Anders Behring Breivik =

2012 trial of the Norwegian mass murderer

- Court: Oslo District Court
- Decided: 24 August 2012
- Verdict: Breivik found sane and guilty on terrorism charges
- Defendant: Anders Behring Breivik

Case history
- Subsequent action: Breivik sentenced to 21 years in preventive detention with a minimum term of 10 years

Court membership
- Judges sitting: Wenche Elizabeth Arntzen, Arne Lyng

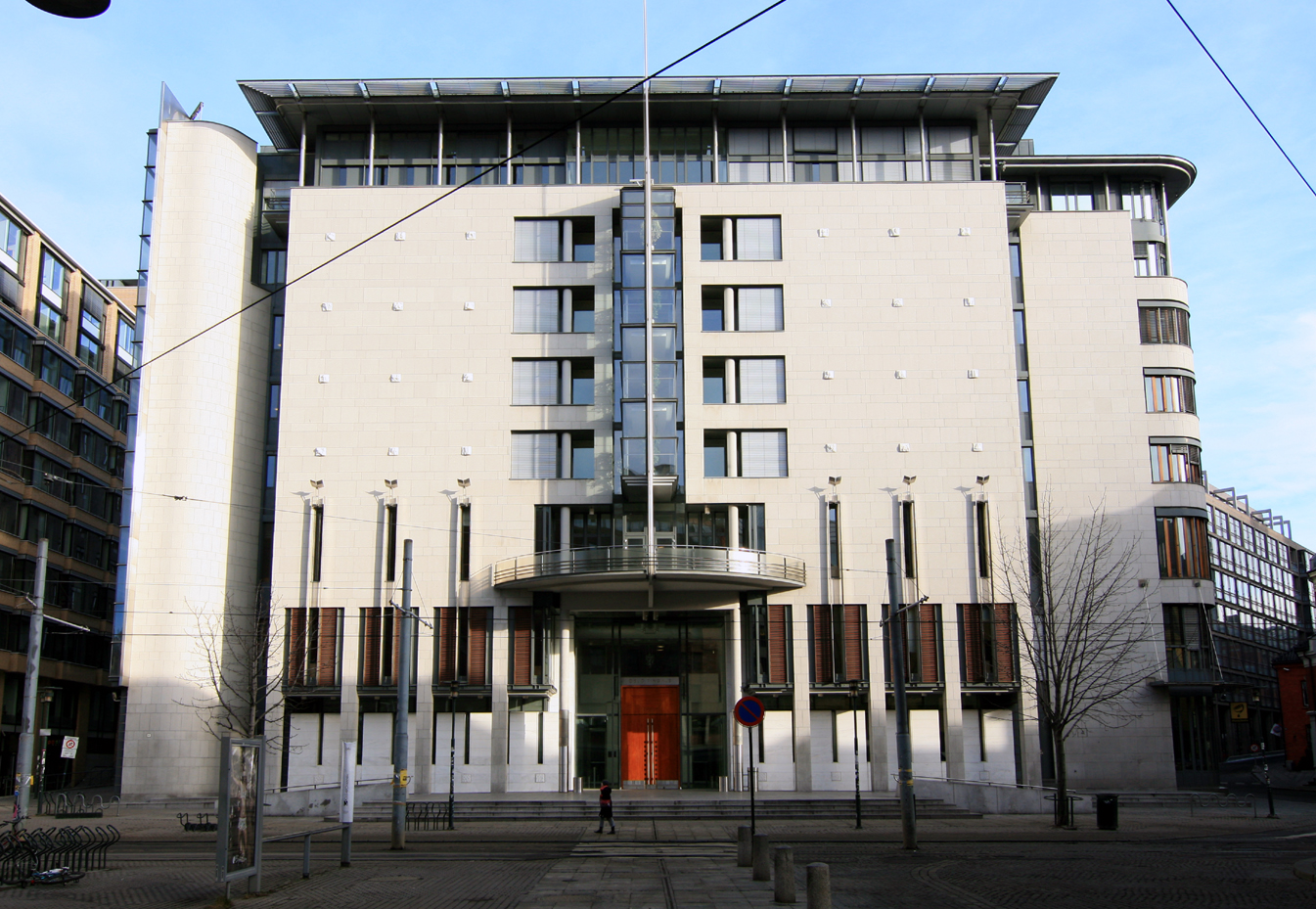
Oslo Courthouse, where the trial was held

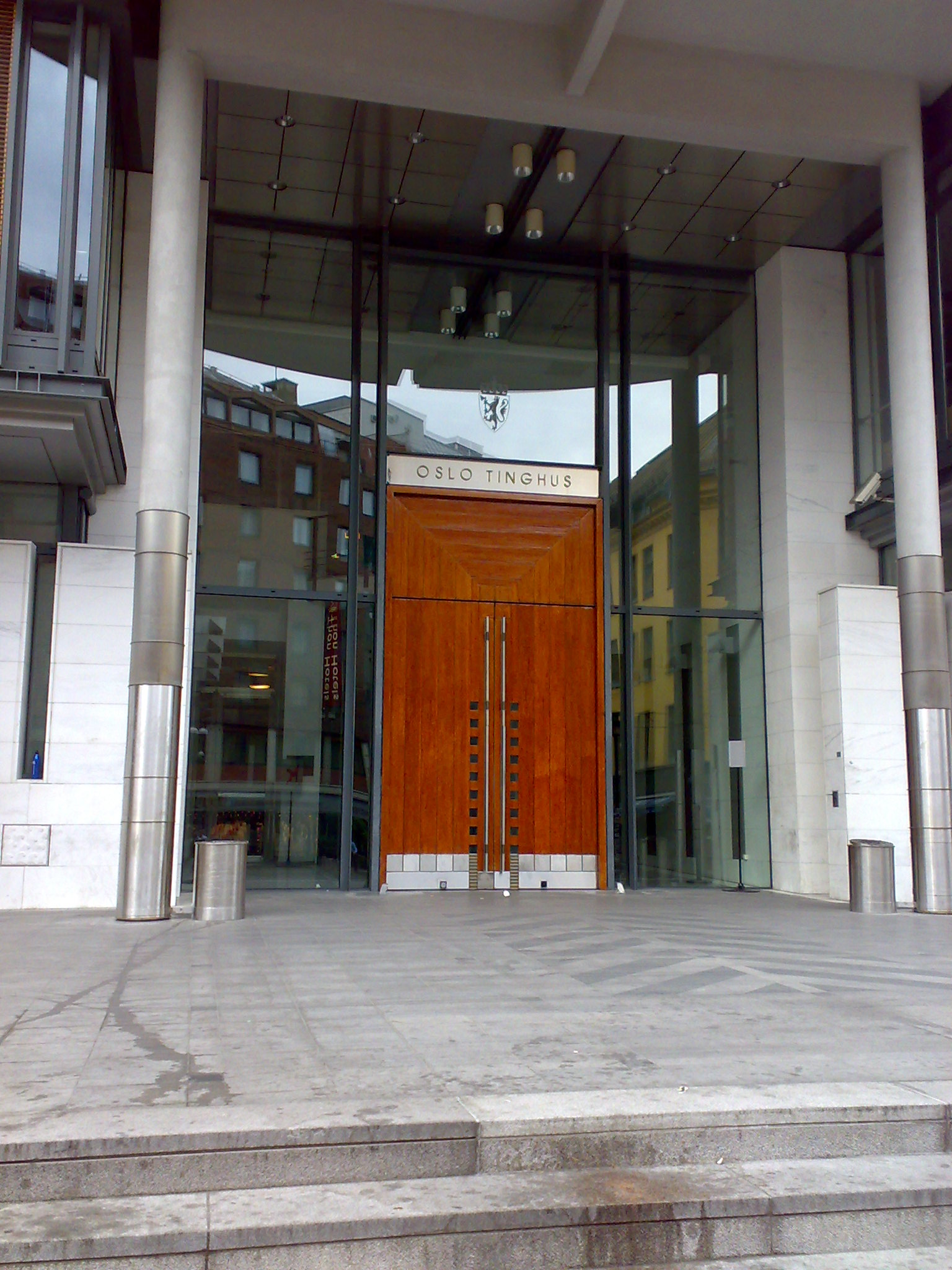
The main entrance of Oslo Courthouse

The trial of Anders Behring Breivik, the perpetrator of the 2011 Norway attacks, took place between 16 April and 22 June 2012 in Oslo District Court. Breivik was sentenced to 21 years of preventive detention on 24 August 2012. 170 media organisations were accredited to cover the proceedings, involving some 800 individual journalists.

The main question during the trial became the extent of the defendant's criminal responsibility for these attacks and thereby whether he would be sentenced to imprisonment or committed to a psychiatric hospital. Two psychiatric reports with conflicting conclusions were submitted prior to the trial, leading to questions about the soundness and future role of forensic psychiatry in Norway.

== Background ==
On 25 July 2011, Breivik was charged with violating paragraph 147a of the Norwegian criminal code, "destabilising or destroying basic functions of society" and "creating serious fear in the population", both acts of terrorism under Norwegian law.

Forensic psychiatrists Torgeir Husby and Synne Sørheim, who conducted the psychiatric analysis of Breivik and released their report in December 2011, found that he was suffering from paranoid schizophrenia, supporting a would-be insanity defence or criminal insanity ruling by the court. However, subject to massive criticism from legal and psychiatric experts, the court decided to appoint two new psychiatrists, Terje Tørrissen and Agnar Aspaas, who were to conduct another analysis. Breivik was initially uncooperative with the new psychiatrists because of the previous report having been leaked to the media, but he later changed his mind and decided to cooperate. On 10 April 2012, psychiatrists found that Breivik was legally sane. If that conclusion were upheld, Breivik could have been sentenced to prison or containment.

=== Parties ===
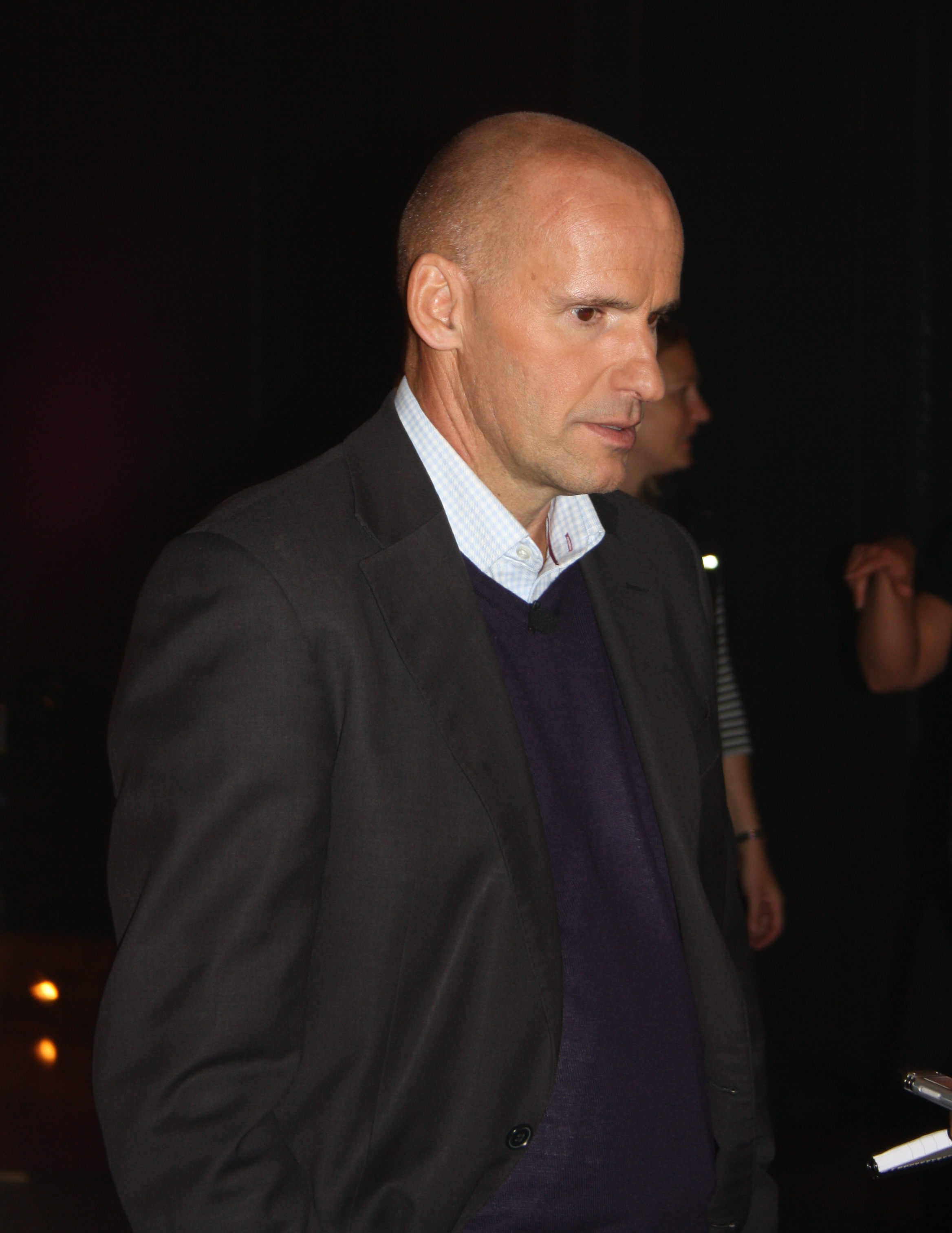
Geir Lippestad, Breivik's defence counsel.

Breivik was represented by his defence counsel Geir Lippestad, Vibeke Hein Bæra, Tord Jordet and Odd Ivar Grøn. Bæra, who had ten years of experience as public prosecutor, was hired as a partner following Lippestad's accepting the request from Breivik to defend him. The prosecution was represented by state prosecutors Svein Holden and Inga Bejer Engh.

The presiding judge was Wenche Elizabeth Arntzen. She was joined by judge Arne Lyng and lay judges Ernst Henning Eielsen, Anne Wisløff and Diana Patricia Fynbo. Wisløff came in as an alternate after Thomas Indrebø had to recuse on the second day of the trial when it came to light that he had advocated the death penalty on a Facebook page the day after the terror attacks.

- Defendant
  - Anders Behring Breivik
- Judges
  - District court judges
    - Wenche Elizabeth Arntzen (court administrator)
    - Arne Lyng
  - Lay judges in Oslo District Court
    - Thomas Indrebø, receptionist (16–17 April)
    - Anne Elisabeth Wisløff, retired family consultant (from 17 April)
    - Diana Patricia Fynbo, teacher
    - Ernst Henning Eielsen, advisor
    - Ole Westerås (reserve), Lier, teacher
- Defence
  - Main defence counsel
    - Geir Lippestad, lawyer
    - Vibeke Hein Bæra, lawyer
  - Assisting counsels (employed by Lippestad Law Firm)
    - Tord Eskild Jordet, associate lawyer
    - Odd Ivar Grøn, associate lawyer
- Prosecution
  - Inga Bejer Engh, prosecutor
  - Svein Holden, prosecutor
- Court-appointed psychiatrists
  - Torgeir Husby, psychiatrist
  - Synne Sørheim, psychiatrist
  - Agnar Aspaas, psychiatrist
  - Terje Tørrissen, psychiatrist
- 166 counsel for the aggrieved have been appointed
- Three coordinating counsel for the aggrieved representing the 166 in court
  - Siv Hallgren (for aggrieved from the Government quarter)
  - Frode Elgesem (for AUF, and aggrieved from Utøya)
  - Mette Yvonne Larsen (assisting the appointed, spokesperson)

=== Witnesses ===
Breivik's list of witnesses includeded far right activist Tore Tvedt, Labour Party politician Raymond Johansen, prominent Islamists Mullah Krekar and Arfan Qadeer Bhatti, and anti-Islamist blogger Fjordman.

The purpose of calling Mullah Krekar was to help establish for the defence that political and ideological extremism is not a psychiatric disorder and should not be treated legally with insanity.

== Start of trial ==
=== Day 1 (16 April) ===
External videos
- 16 April
- 17 April
- 18 April
- 19 April
- 20 April
- 23 April
- 24 April
- 25 April
- 26 April
- 27 April
- 3 May
- 4 May
- 8 May
- 9 May
- 10 May
- 11 May
- 14 May
- 15 May
- 16 May
- 21 May

On Monday 16 April 2012, when offered the opportunity to speak, Breivik said that he did not recognise the legitimacy of the Court because it derived its authority from parties supporting multi-culturalism. Breivik also claimed that presiding judge, Wenche Elizabeth Arntzen, was a close friend of Hanne Harlem, the sister of former prime minister Gro Harlem Brundtland. To the question from Arntzen whether this constituted a formal assertion of conflict of interest, Breivik's main defence counsel Geir Lippestad, after cursorily conferring with Breivik, replied that it was not.

The charges were read out to Breivik by prosecutor Inga Bejer Engh including the indictments of terrorism and premeditated murder. Descriptions were provided of how each victim was killed.

When asked to plead after hearing the charge-sheet, Breivik responded that he acknowledged that he had committed the offences, but pleaded not guilty because he was acting out of "necessity" (Norwegian: nødrett). A court translator incorrectly rendered this as "self-defence" (Norwegian: nødverge), but court officials corrected the error on the second day.

Prosecutor Svein Holden then outlined Breivik's life in the preceding decade, including lists of failed business ventures, and a year living off savings and playing World of Warcraft, at which mention Breivik apparently broke into a broad grin. At one point when the court was shown his 12-minute YouTube video, he started crying.

An unidentified woman, a German national, was apprehended by the police as she tried to force herself into the court building, asserting herself as Breivik's girlfriend and displaying the photo of Breivik in military gear on her cell phone. According to the police she had a criminal record in Germany for several instances of disturbing the peace. She had arrived in Oslo from Stuttgart on the preceding day and rented a hotel room, expecting to stay for 14 days. Following an expulsion decision from Oslo Police District she was escorted out of Norway on 17 April.

== Defendant's testimony ==
=== Day 2 (17 April) ===
The second day was the opening day of Breivik's testimony, which was expected to last for a week, including cross-examination.

The court was told that a lay judge, Thomas Indrebø, had posted remarks in the immediate aftermath of the defendant's acts on 22 July 2011, that the perpetrator ought to be given the death penalty, and proceedings were adjourned to consider the implications of this, which consequently led to the dismissal of that judge.

Breivik often spoke with the collective "we" with reference to supposed association with others sharing his ideology. He focused on his purported fight against "multiculturalism" and compared it with the struggle of Tibet for "self-rule" and "cultural protection" from China. When asked about the greatest influence on his ideology and the biggest source of his worldview, Breivik said, "Wikipedia".

Breivik has claimed he would repeat the attacks given the chance. He claims he acted out of a desire to fight "communism" and to defend Norway and Europe against Muslims and multiculturalists. He maintained that he cannot be insane and was acting out of "goodness", and that he was part of an organisation called "Knights Templar" (KT).

Before starting his testimony the defendant had requested that he be allowed to begin by reading a document which he had written in the weeks leading up to the trial. Much of Breivik's speech could be seen as a summation of his previous 1,500-page manifesto published online just prior to the attacks. On several occasions during the day judges asked the defendant to keep his statements brief, and some of the aggrieved through their counsels voiced concerns that he may be going too far in using his defence statement as a platform for his ideological views. Breivik claims he would have preferred to target a group of journalists instead of the island camp, and that he had envisaged being killed in the course of his actions.

In his prepared speech Breivik gave a major focus to a statement by Norwegian social anthropologist Thomas Hylland Eriksen. The quote which originates in a January 2008 interview with Eriksen, is: "Our most important task ahead is to deconstruct the majority, and we must deconstruct them so thoroughly that they will never be able to call themselves the majority again." Breivik explained how he interpreted Eriksen's statement to mean that Eriksen, and the rest of the multiculturalists, want to deconstruct the Norwegian ethnic group so that they will never again constitute a majority. Eriksen had been disclosed as a witness for the defence, but did not ultimately appear during the trial.

When asked by prosecutor Inga Bejer Engh why he had broken into tears the opening day, Breivik responded that he had been weeping for Norway and his perception of its deconstruction: "I thought, 'My country and my ethnic group are dying.'" Breivik also claims he does acknowledge the pain he has caused to people and families in Norway but did not apologise at that time.

=== Day 3 (18 April) ===
The defendant greeted the court with his same fist-salute as he did the first day. Breivik had been asked to not greet the court in such a manner, at the request of lawyers for the victims.

Breivik was cross-examined about the contacts that he had made in his preparation. All he wanted at first to reveal was that he had travelled to both London and Liberia, and also had spoken with Norwegians online. The contact in Liberia happened to be a Serb, but he insisted on saying no more ostensibly because he wanted no more arrests. The Norwegian police had suspected the Serb may be Milorad Ulemek which was denied both by the defendant and by lawyers for Ulemek. On the fifth day of the trial the Bosnian investigative weekly newspaper Slobodna Bosna reported that Milorad Pelemiš, a participant in the Srebrenica massacre of 1995, was Breivik's Serb contact. This was relayed to the trial parties and the Norwegian police by the news media. As of 27 April 2012, follow-up investigations by the media had come up with conflicting information on this possibility.

Breivik claimed to have been inspired by Serb nationalism, and was angered by the NATO bombing of Serbia in 1999. He said that he had founded The Knights Templar in London in 2002, and if the police dispute that to the depth as described by the defendant, it was because they had not done a sufficiently thorough job in investigating. He reaffirmed a lack of desire to give any information that could contribute to further arrests.

The defendant went on to claim that, KT as he calls it, does not exist as an organisation in its "conventional" understanding, but rather is "leaderless" and clustered around "independent cells".

Allegedly there had been meetings with four individual nationalists, including "Richard", being the defendant's "mentor", and described as a "perfect knight", in a "founding" session. The prosecution attacked Breivik's version and alleged that he was making it all up. By some accounts the defendant would get vexed at the repeated suggestion that there is no such network, and he insisted there are 15–20 members in the Knights Templar.

Breivik talked about martyrdom and his actions making him a role model, and he emphasised that this could not be achieved as "keyboard warriors". He also used the term "sofa generals" when he asserted that one cannot be afraid to die if one wants to promote martyrdom.

Breivik himself commented on the trial this day that there ought to be one of only two possible outcomes in the case, that of death penalty, or an acquittal. He said of the maximum sentence of 21 years imprisonment prescribed by Norwegian law that this is "pathetic".

=== Day 4 (19 April) ===
Conceding to complaints from the counsels for the aggrieved, the defendant did not start the session with a salute to the court.

Breivik was questioned about his reasons for moving back in with his mother in 2006. He disputed that it had been because he had been made bankrupt, he said he had been working hard from 2002 to 2006 and needed a break, and that he could save money that way whilst also preparing his manifesto. Also he revealed he kept liquid finances in that house, as cash in a safe.

Breivik was also questioned about his year playing World of Warcraft. He denies this could be linked with his actions. It was for him simply a game of "strategy" not "violence". He also testified that he played another computer game, Call of Duty: Modern Warfare 2, for 16 months as practice before using his actual rifle. He emphasised that he didn't really like playing but it was necessary to gain the required practical skills.

Breivik testified that the guns he used at Utøya were inscribed with rune names. His rifle had the name Gungnir, which is the name of Odin's spear, which returns to its owner upon use. His Glock pistol bore the name Mjölnir, the name of Thor the warrior god's hammer.

In response to questioning about his motivations, Breivik said that he had tried more peaceful methods to convey his ideology, and had been resisted by the press. He decided to use violent means. This would have involved targeting the actual Labor Party's conference, or a Norwegian journalists' annual conference. In the event he had no time, neither to detonate more bombs. It was then that he claims to have conceded to an idea to launch the shooting spree on the island, and due to human limitations did not manage to shoot everyone there.

The courtroom was visibly shaken and many people, including journalists, were weeping when Breivik told that his goal at Utøya had not been to kill 69 people, but to kill everybody. He wanted to frighten the youth there enough so that everybody would get into the water to escape. The water would then function as a weapon of mass destruction since, he reasoned, the people would be unable to swim out of fear.

Detailed planning was talked about. Breivik's original plans involved three car bombs and shooting sprees across Oslo, and Breivik called it a "very large operation". Breivik said he thought about placing a bomb near the Labor Party headquarters; the Parliament of Norway Building; the Aftenposten offices; Oslo City Hall; and the Norwegian Royal Palace, though for the latter he claimed he would have forewarned the Royals.

The Defendant explained how he hoped for the killings of all members of the Norwegian government cabinet in his bombing, and how he also would have beheaded the former Prime Minister of Norway, Gro Harlem Brundtland, if things had gone to plan. He added that he envisaged handcuffing her and then beheading her using the bayonet on his rifle, whilst recording the killing on an iPhone, and then posting it online.

=== Day 5 (20 April) ===
In advocating his own sanity, Breivik on this day asked the court to distinguish "clinical insanity" from what he alleged is his own "political extremism", and conceded that what he did caused huge suffering. Breivik said how he potentially could comprehend the human suffering resulting from his actions but that he deliberately blocked this from his immediate consciousness to cope.

The defendant went into great detail about his shooting spree on the island. The technicalities and level of description used was difficult for the victims' families and survivors to listen to. Breivik claimed that he had hesitated and did not feel entirely at ease as he set out on his operation. He described how his victims reacted and said that it sometimes came as a surprise to him, saying that he had never seen for example on television how people in such circumstances might become effectively immobilised. Breivik would find some of the teenagers lying on the ground pretending to be dead and he shot them too. Breivik said that there are gaps in his memory of some of the 90 or so minutes he spent killing on the island. The defendant also said that he had considered wearing a Swastika for the operation for its scaring effect but chose not to because he did not want to appear a Nazi.

Breivik mentioned that he was ordinarily a nice person. He said that he very nearly backed out of doing the operation on the island, and whilst he was carrying it out, was in a state of what he described as shock, and he was just about functioning. He also claimed that there were a few people on the island whom he spared because he perceived them to be very young.

=== Day 6 (23 April) ===
This had been scheduled to be Breivik's last day of testimony, being a day longer than originally listed, but the prosecution had applied to the court for more time to cross-examine the defendant.

Breivik apologised for the deaths of "innocent" passers-by in Oslo caught in the bombings; Breivik did not apologise for deaths on the island, which he considered political. He has commented that what he did was "a small barbarian act to prevent a larger barbarian act".

Breivik wanted the court to believe that he himself had lost his family, friends, and "everything" on the day he carried out the attacks. He believed however that whoever was on the island was a "legitimate target" through being the "political activists" that sought the "deconstruction of Norwegian society" using "multiculturalism". Also he described what he did as being "cruel but necessary". Breivik says he felt repulsion at what he was doing but at the same time a compulsion because he feels it would avoid something worse in future.

The defendant alleged that he was the victim of a "racist plot" in the prosecution's efforts to find him legally insane, and his behaviour irrational. Breivik argued that no "bearded jihadist" would have been subjected to investigations of sanity, and as a "militant nationalist" the prosecution were out to delegitimise his ideology.

== Prosecution witnesses ==
=== Day 7 (24 April) ===
The prosecution opened by calling their first witness, Tor Inge Kristoffersen, a government security guard. This witness's job on the day of the attacks involved security monitoring, from the basement of government headquarters. The witness was asked to describe what he saw on the day; he had seen a car being parked, and then someone emerge wearing what "looked like a guard's uniform". Just as Krisoffersen was zooming in on that car's number plate, it exploded. About half of the screens used in the monitoring went blank. The security staff radio network also went down.

Bomb scientist Svein Olav Christensen was then called to the stand. Christensen led the investigation into the technical aspects of the bomb. His testimony included photos of the reconstructed bomb exploding as well as surveillance photos of the actual blast.

Then, Oslo police sergeant Thor Langli took the stand. Langli testified about the Oslo Police's actions in the immediate aftermath of the bombing. Langli commented how at first there had been reports that there were two suspects behind the attacks.

The next witnesses was forensics specialist Ragde who talked about the findings on the crime scene in Regjeringskvartalet, and coroners Stray-Pedersen and Størseth, who presented the autopsy reports.

=== Day 8 (25 April) ===
Coroner's reports on the eight bombing victims were heard by the court, and described "immense violence" for all of them.

The first bomb survivor to give evidence was 26-year-old Eivind Dahl Thoresen. Thoresen described how he had been talking on his mobile, when the bomb exploded. He had been standing only metres away, and was thrown backwards by the blast. Thoresen saw another survivor just down the road, and began to approach him to assist, because he noticed he had horrific injuries. Thoresen went on to say how he also was badly injured and heavily bleeding.

Vidar Vestli also survived the blast, and his consequent condition had not allowed him to give live evidence. His witness statement was read to the court, where it was told how he had lost a leg in the blast, had a chest "full of shrapnel", and poor mental health.

Another survivor, Tone Maria With, claimed she is now too afraid to venture into central Oslo. She recounted how amid the confusion of the bomb blast, she realised she had a hole in her chest and thought she was going to die. She also suffered hearing loss as a consequence.

==== Second testimony for the defence ====
Breivik took the stand for the second time to give evidence for the defence. He conceded that it had been hard to hear live evidence from witnesses for the prosecution but he also said that the Labour government should apologise for their immigration policies.

Breivik spoke about his views on the respective psychiatric reports, the earlier deeming him insane and the latter saying he was not insane. Breivik said that the report concluding his insanity was made of "evil fabrications" and insisted the ulterior motive behind such conclusions were "meant to portray him as irrational and unintelligent".

Breivik contested the damning psychiatric report and alleged that 80% of it was false. Specifically his allegations were:

- The purported quoting of himself omitted pronouns e.g. "I" which according to the defendant was deliberately done to make him look "retarded";
- It claimed he had a fear of radiation, which the defendant alleged is untrue as he has no such fear;
- The report alleged that Breivik's mask which he wore during his attacks was intended as an attempted defence to bacteria, being an irrational fear of his, and Breivik claimed this was untrue as it was meant for a different purpose, namely filtering particulates;
- Breivik cites that none of his interviews featuring in the substance of the report were tape-recorded;
- He also alleged in general that the assessors started with a conclusion and worked back towards what they wanted to find.

In questioning, Breivik challenged the prosecution's view that he could not look after himself, and said he does cook and clean, and that he had been bearing up in prison well.

=== Day 9 (26 April) ===
More survivors of the Oslo bombings testified in court. Harald Føsker was one of them. He needed surgery on his face as a consequence of being caught in the blasts. Føsker was employed at the Ministry of Justice at the time. He described how he was so badly injured that he did not feel the physical pain until the next day. His teeth were knocked out. He needed surgery to reconstruct his face, and also for his vision and hearing.

Another victim, female, testified that she could not remember the events of the day because she has suffered head trauma.

At noon, 40,000 protesters met in Oslo and marched to the courthouse singing a children's song which Breivik had testified earlier was part of the brainwashing of Norwegian children. Similar protests were held in other cities.

=== Day 10 (27 April) ===
Tore Raasok testified on the injuries he sustained as a result of the bombings. Raasok worked for the Ministry of Transport in Oslo, and on 22 July 2011 when he had been leaving the office he was caught in a blast. Shards of glass had flown into his eyes and his legs had been crushed. Since then he has had a leg amputated, undergone 10 surgical operations, and has lost use of one of his arms.

Another prosecution witness, Kristian Rasmussen, described how he had been in his office sending an email when "everything went black" and he went into a coma for 12 days. He sustained head injuries, bleeding on the brain, a broken neck, and abdominal wounds.

=== Day 17 (11 May) ===
The presentation of autopsy reports was concluded on this day.

An incident took place when a spectator shouted "Go to hell, go to hell, you killed my brother", then threw a shoe towards Breivik, but hit the defence attorney Vibeke Hein Bæra. The incident initiated some spontaneous applause, while the thrower was taken out of the courtroom and handed over to medical personnel. The thrower was Hayder Mustafa Qasim, an Iraqi who was the brother of Karar Mustafa Qasim, one of the victims who had been killed at Utøya. Shoe throwing is a mark of extreme contempt in Arab culture, signifying that the target is worth no more than the dirt that one steps in. Footage of the incident was not permitted to be released.

=== Day 23 (23 May) ===
Survivors of the attacks on the island continued to give testimony, including a number of teenaged girls. Fifteen-year-old Ylva Helene Schwenke was aged 14 when the attacks occurred and took four bullets. She is physically scarred and showed this to the courtroom at large. She commented on this saying her scars were "the price for democracy" because she feels democracy has prevailed. Apparently this commentary caused Breivik to grin.

Breivik also smiled when he was described by another prosecution witness, an 18-year-old girl who remained anonymous, as being "an idiot".

17-year-old Andrine Johansen testified as to how she believes one of her friends took a bullet that would have killed her, and thus sacrificed his own life to save hers. She had witnessed Breivik killing 14 people, several of whom were her personal friends. Johansen described the defendant actually holding his gun to a victim's head and pulling the trigger.

Johansen told how she had already been shot in the chest, and had fallen into the lake. Once the others had been killed, Breivik returned his attention to her, allegedly smiling. A victim named Henrik Rasmussen is said to have jumped into the line of fire, thus sacrificing his life for Johansen, whilst "Breivik had laughed with joy as he continued with the bloodbath...[during which narrative]...the accused shook his head at the description".

=== Day 24 (24 May) ===
More prosecution witnesses testified. Mathias Eckhoff aged 21 had been shot in the thighs and his scrotum. Eckhoff and others had met at the café/pumphouse on the island to discuss the bombings in Oslo, and that is when Breivik arrived. When the group encountered Breivik outside, Eckhoff says he had demanded to see Breivik's ID as he was dressed as a police officer and was informing them the bomber had yet been apprehended.

Breivik is said to have opened fire, and then Eckhoff was shot, and escaped by jumping into the water. Eckhoff said he could not use his legs which had been shot, only his arms.

Mohamad Hadi Hamed also aged 21 was the second witness of the day. He had asked if Breivik could be removed from the courtroom whilst he was testifying. He was using a wheelchair. He had been in the group that were opened fire upon by Breivik at the pumphouse along with Eckhoff.

Hamed had been shot in the abdomen, shoulder and thigh, and had an arm and a leg amputated as a result of his injuries.

=== Day 25 (25 May) ===
When Adrian Pracon testified about his meeting with Breivik at Utøya, he looked steadfastly at the defendant, even when answering questions from the prosecutor. Breivik was visibly uncomfortable and only looked back at the witness in brief glimpses. "Breivik made an error when he decided to spare me, seen from his perspective. Now I really understand how fragile our society is," Pracon testified. "I see how much it is worth and the importance of politics. I will continue with politics, and the Labour Party remains closer to my heart." Pracon was the only witness who looked at the defendant in this way. He was first shot in the shoulder, then the attacker decided not to kill him. Breivik has testified earlier about why he decided not to kill Pracon.

=== Day 36 (5 June) ===
Defence lawyers for Breivik, trying to portray him as not insane, invited right-wing extremists to testify at the trial. Among the witnesses were Tore Tvedt, founder of the group Vigrid, and Arne Tumyr of the organisation Stop Islamisation of Norway (SIAN). They argued that there are people who share Breivik's political views, yet are not insane. Many of the extremists called echoed Breivik's political views; one said that "Islam is an evil political ideology disguised as a religion." However, they distanced themselves from Breivik's violent actions.

== Court-appointed psychiatrists ==
=== Day 37–38 (14–15 June) ===
Court-appointed psychiatrists Husby and Sørheim acknowledge no competence on terrorism and explain that they have evaluated Breivik without putting him into a political context. Without this context, the language he uses becomes incomprehensible (neologisms), his lack of remorse towards the victims becomes lack of empathy, his long period of isolation and preparation becomes inadequate functioning, and his explanations of why he carried out the operation become delusions and fantasies about violence. In this manner, his political ideology and the way he sees himself in the context of this ideology becomes evidence of paranoid schizophrenia.

The defence says that they would understand the psychotic evaluation if Breivik had been talking about invaders from Mars, but find it difficult to understand how thoughts about a possible future Muslim invasion of Europe should be seen as a strong indication of schizophrenia. When asked what makes Breivik different from a "normal" terrorist, Husby and Sørheim say that they have no knowledge of how terrorists think, and find such comparative analysis not relevant to the mandate for their evaluation.

=== Day 39–40 (18–19 June) ===
Court-appointed psychiatrists Aspaas and Tørrissen acknowledge the political context of Breivik's thoughts and actions, and thus see no sign of psychosis. As they see the defendant, he is not clinically insane but a political terrorist with a psychological profile that makes it possible to understand how he was capable of carrying out the terror operation.

== Closing speeches ==
The central theme of the defence closing speech was that Breivik, who never denied the facts of the case, is sane and should therefore not be committed to psychiatric care. The prosecutor, Svein Holden, had argued that since the first psychiatric report was written in a non-falsifiable manner, it is impossible to disprove that Breivik is insane, and it then follows that he should be committed to psychiatric care because there would be more harm in sentencing a psychotic person to ordinary prison than a non-psychotic person to a psychiatric facility.

=== Day 43 (22 June) ===
On the last day of the trial Breivik delivered a 45-minute defence speech summarising the trial from his perspective. The court had decided to refuse video or audio transmission of this speech and rejected appeals from the Norwegian media to reverse this.

==== Bootleg recording ====
On 26 July, it became known that a bootleg recording of this speech had been posted on the video-sharing site YouTube. According to Agence France-Presse, the video had been posted by a German man who stated that he had received the video from an elected member of the Norwegian Progress Party. According to Norwegian news media, it was a Norwegian man who originally posted the recording on YouTube on 27 June. The man, who told media he didn't know he was breaking the law, subsequently removed the video from his YouTube account. Coordinating counsel for the aggrieved Mette Yvonne Larsen petitioned Oslo District Court to have the video removed from YouTube, which according to them is not fit for publication since it contains incitement to commit criminal acts.

== Verdict and sentencing ==
On 24 August 2012, beginning approximately 10 a.m. CEST, the court formally began to read the verdict against Breivik. Breivik was adjudged sane and sentenced to containment—a special form of a prison sentence that can be extended indefinitely—with a time frame of 21 years and a minimum time of 10 years, the maximum penalty in Norway.

Explaining why the court found Breivik to be sane, the court stated that "many people share Breivik's conspiracy theory, including the Eurabia theory. The court finds that very few people, however, share Breivik's idea that the alleged "Islamization" should be fought with terror."

When asked by the judge whether he accepted the verdict and sentence, Breivik announced that he did not recognise the legitimacy of the court, and would therefore neither accept nor appeal. His attempt at addressing other "militant nationalists" in Norway and Europe was interrupted by the judge. Lacking a formal acceptance of the sentence, the judge formally interpreted this as taking a two-week contemplation period, but Breivik's attorney said there would be no appeal from the defence. At a press conference after the verdict, the prosecuting attorneys announced that they would not appeal either.

== Commentary on the proceedings ==
In contrast to practice in many countries, the defendant was allowed many apparent concessions. Both the fact that he is allowed five full days to give his testimony, elaborating on his ideology, as well as court-room interactions where both the prosecutors and counsel for the aggrieved shook the defendant's hand at the beginning of the proceedings baffled some commentators but to others showed that the Norwegian court system is capable of respecting all people.

Research by the International Centre for Counter Terrorism has shown that in Norway the proceedings of the trial had a positive impact on the coping mechanisms in society. Moreover, the trial proceedings were seen as a positive counter-weight to Breivik's acts by most Norwegians.

== In the arts ==
Swiss director Milo Rau and his International Institute of Political Murder created a stage performance called Breivik's Statement, which presented a reading of Breivik's actual address to the court, read by Turkish German actress Sascha Ö. Soydan. Intended as political theatre, its world premiere was on 19 October 2012 at the Deutsches Nationaltheater Weimar in Weimar, Germany, and it has been subsequently been staged in Belgium. It was banned from performance on at least two occasions in Germany. One was by Munich's Haus der Kunst in March 2013, where it was planned to be staged as part of a "young director" festival. Organisers Munich Volkstheater had rented the hall for the performance, but it was banned owing to "a clause in the rental agreement that excludes right-wing extremist and anti-Semitic content". In 2019 it was not allowed to be performed at the Nationaltheater Weimar as part of a congress organised by Rau, under the title "Power and Dissent".
