= Brynjar Meling =

Norwegian lawyer (born 1967)

Brynjar Nielsen Meling (born 29 May 1967) is a Norwegian lawyer.

== Personal life ==
Meling is married and have four children. He usually votes for the Conservative Party, but voted blank in 2003 as a result of the party joining the other parties in demanding to repatriate Mullah Krekar. He was a Salvation Army soldier until 2003 when he withdrew to not become a burden for the organisation as a result of his work as a lawyer, defending controversial figures.

== Career ==
He became famous overnight after being appointed as the public defender of Mullah Krekar, and has since also worked on a number of other high-profile cases, mainly cases directly targeted against Norwegian commercial and political interests. He is noted for especially defending immigrants and Muslims suspected for various criminal offences.

Some of his other more famous cases include:

- Mohammed Shah Rais (also known as "The bookseller of Kabul"), who is planning to sue Åsne Seierstad for defamation of character in her book The Bookseller of Kabul (ISBN 0-316-73450-0) which she wrote after staying with his family in Kabul for several months.
- Osman Omar Osman, a Kurd with dual Norwegian and Iraqi citizenship. He is accused of killing his Norwegian wife while on vacation in Iraq, and was sentenced to death by hanging on March 10, 2005 by a local Iraqi court. The sentence was however annulled due to "wrongful application of the law", and a new trial before the same court was scheduled for August 10, 2005. After several delays the trial was finally held, and on October 10, 2005 he was again sentenced to death. According to a spokesman for the Norwegian Department of Foreign Affairs, the judge in the case has assured them that the sentence will most likely be converted to life imprisonment by a higher court, and that the death sentence would not be carried out in any case. Meling has been Osman's appointed lawyer in Norway, however he has not been directly involved in the case other than consulting with Osman's Iraqi lawyer and petitioning the Norwegian and Iraqi governments to have the case transferred to a Norwegian court since the victim and accused were both Norwegian citizens. However, since Osman was also an Iraqi citizen this was denied.
- Abdul Rauf Mohammad, former Taliban government minister who was expelled from Norway due to a domestic violence case and his involvement in Islamist circles and possibly terror-related activities.

== Controversy ==
Meling's choice of clients has made him an unpopular man in many circles. Meling has received a steady stream of hate mail, ranging from neatly hand-written letters filled with Bible quotes that wish him a happy journey to hell to old ladies walking up to him to tell him he ought to be ashamed.

In 2004 a dying man who had been a longtime supporter of the Salvation Army contacted the local Salvation Army branch in Bergen and informed them that he had changed his will to exclude the organisation after learning that Meling was a member. He had previously intended to leave 1 million NOK to the local branch and an unspecified amount for the Salvation Army's work abroad. Meling had in fact resigned from the Salvation Army about 6 months earlier in 2003 to avoid being a liability to the organisation, but he still listed as a member in early 2004 due to slow internal bureaucracy. When questioned about the incident Meling said he was "saddened" that people would punish a volunteer organisation he had been a member of because of his work as a lawyer.

After presenting a bill for 1,000 hours (for a total amount of 956,000 NOK / 116,000 Euro) to the government for his public defence of mullah Krekar, he has also been accused of being greedy. According to Norwegian law all asylum seekers are entitled to a certain number of hours of lawyer assistance, but the government felt that his claim was excessive and refused to pay for more than 80 hours. Meling insists all the billed hours were necessary to provide a fair trial for his client, considering the vast amount of evidence presented by various intelligence agencies (some of which had been thrown out of court upon closer examination), and the fact that the case had become highly political.
