= Hadijat Gatayeva =

Russian nurse and activist

Hadijat Gatayeva (also transliterated Hadizhat Gataeva or Khadijad Gataeva) is a Chechen Muslim humanitarian activist who, together with her husband Malik, took care of some of the Grozny's war orphans. She is usually referred to just as Hadijat.

Gatayeva and her children were one of the subject of the 2005 documentary film The 3 Rooms of Melancholia (Melancholian 3 huonetta) by Pirjo Honkasalo, who kept in contact with her ever since. Hadijat is also the titular "angel" in the 2008 book Angel of Grozny: Orphans of a Forgotten War by Åsne Seierstad.

== Biography ==
Gatayeva, who had served as a young field nurse for the separatist forces in the First Chechen War, opened a makeshift orphanage for street children in 1996. After the beginning of the Second Chechen War in 1999, for a period of time she had operated her orphanage in a refugee camp in the neighbouring republic of Ingushetia; she was forced to return to destroyed Grozny after electricity and water were cut off from the camp after the ascent of Murat Zyazikov in 2002.

Eventually, she moved from Russia to Kaunas in Lithuania. On 16 October 2008 Gatayeva reportedly went "missing" after she and her husband were arrested by the Lithuanian security police in Kaunas on unspecified charges.

On 7 January 2010 Gatayeva and her husband were arrested by Finnish police. The arrest was based on European Arrest Warrant from Lithuania. Before the arrest Gatayeva and her husband had applied for political asylum in Finland. The asylum against the political persecution by Lithuanian authorities was granted in May 2012.
