= One of Us (Seierstad book) =

2013 book by Åsne Seierstad

One of Us: The Story of a Massacre in Norway — and Its Aftermath
- First edition (Norwegian)
- Author: Åsne Seierstad
- Original title: En av oss: en fortelling om Norge
- Translator: Sarah Death
- Language: English (Translated)
- Genre: Non-fiction
- Publisher: Kagge
- Publication date: November 2013 (Norwegian Edition)
- Publication place: Norway
- English publication date: 5 March 2015 (UK Edition)
- Pages: 544pp (HC Translation)
- ISBN: 9781844089192 (Virago Edition)
- Preceded by: Angel of Grozny: Inside Chechnya
- Followed by: Two Sisters (2016)
- Originally published in Norwegian by Kagge

One of Us: The Story of a Massacre in Norway — and Its Aftermath is a non-fiction book by Norwegian journalist Åsne Seierstad. It was adapted into the 2018 American film 22 July by English writer and director Paul Greengrass.

== Synopsis ==
One of Us tells the lifestories of several Norwegians – notably 18-year-olds Bano Rashid, Simon Sæbø, and Viljar Hanssen – leading up to the 22 July 2011 attacks by Anders Breivik, when he terrorized both Oslo's Regjeringskvartalet and a summer camp associated with the Norwegian Labour Party.

== Origin ==
Seierstad explains in the epilogue that journalist Tina Brown commissioned her to get anything on "that man" for publication in Newsweek. Instead she wrote about the reaction in Norway, then left for Libya. When Breivik's trial was set to begin, Brown tried again. Seierstad returned to Norway and sat in the courtroom for all 10 weeks of the trial. In Seierstad's words she was "drip-fed the details of the planning and execution of the act of terrorism... these were drops of stories... that were tailored for the purpose of the trial." She wanted to know what really happened (the stream of events not just the drops) so she embarked on the project that became One of Us. She read the police reports, the confidential psychiatric reports, the 22 July commission report, and Breivik's own writing. She interviewed families, friends, and politicians. In her author's note Seierstad reports that all facts told in the narrative come from these sources.

=== Title ===
Seierstad writes about the origins of the title in the epilogue.

One of Us is a book about belonging, a book about community... geographically, politically, and with families. Bano's... greatest aspiration was to be become one of us. There were no shortcuts. This is also a book about looking for a way to belong and not finding it. The perpetrator ultimately opted-out of the community and chose to strike at it in the most brutal of ways... It is also a story about contemporary Norway. It is a story about us.

== Publication ==
One of Us was published in Norway in November 2013 by Kagge (532pp). The subtitle – en fortelling om Norge ('A Tale of Norway') – was expanded for the English market when Sarah Death translated Seierstad for English publication in 2015. The Hachette Book Group published One of Us: The Story of Anders Breivik and the Massacre in Norway in the UK under its Virago Imprint in March 2015. Publishing rights for the Canadian and American markets were purchased – followed by an April 2015 release – by Farrar, Straus and Giroux (FSG). Hachette retained the rights for Australia where the UK edition is sold. Rights in New Zealand are 'open' so both US and UK editions are sold side-by-side. Death's translation was used in all English-language markets concurrently.

=== Editions ===
- Originally published in Norwegian (En av oss: en fortelling om Norge) by Kagge November 2013 (ISBN 9788248912378)
- Published with the subtitle "The Story of Anders Breivik and the Massacre in Norway" by Virago 5 March 2015 in hardcover (ISBN 9781844089192) and ebook (ISBN 9781405521918) — first edition in English
- Published with the subtitle "The Story of a Massacre and its Aftermath" by Virago 4 February 2016 in paperback (ISBN 9781844089185)
- Published with the subtitle "The Story of Anders Breivik and the Massacre in Norway" by FSG 21 April 2015 in hardcover (ISBN 9780374277895) and ebook (ISBN 9780374710200)
- Published with the subtitle "The Story of a Massacre in Norway — and Its Aftermath" by FSG 12 April 2016 in paperback (ISBN 9780374536091)

== Recognition ==
The English-language version of One of Us has been recognized by a number of institutions and publications.

- One of Us was shortlisted for the Crime Writers' Association 2015 Non-Fiction Gold Dagger Award.
- One of Us was a finalist for the New York Public Library's 2016 Helen Bernstein Book Award for Excellence in Journalism.
- One of Us was named one of the 10 best books of the 2015 by The New York Times Book Review.

== See also ==
- Columbine by Dave Cullen
