= Inga Bejer Engh =

Norwegen jurist and former Children's Ombudsman

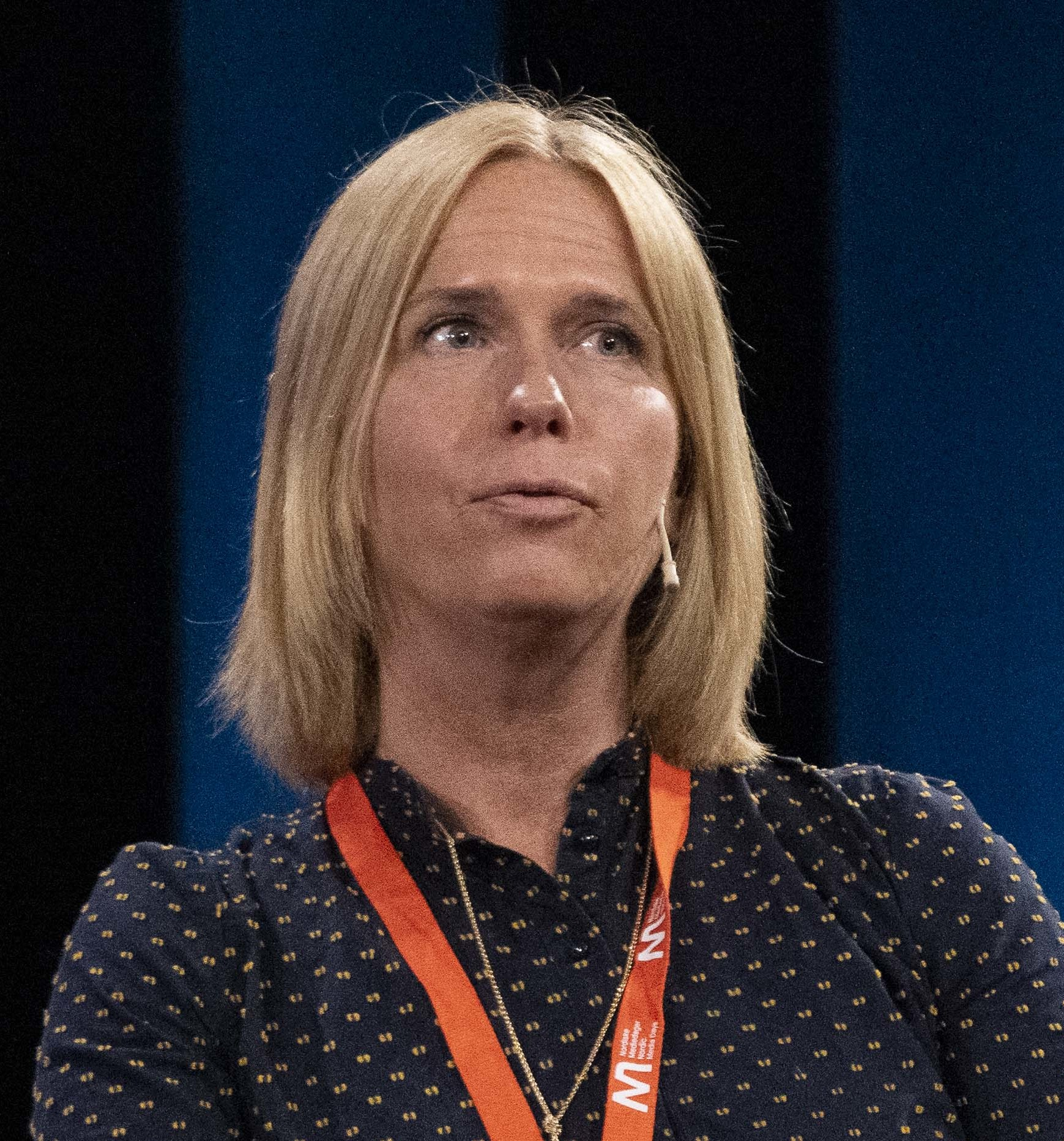
- Bejer Engh in 2022

Children's Ombudsman of Norway
- In office August 2018 – April 2024
- Preceded by: Anne Lindboe
- Succeeded by: Mina Gerhardsen

Personal details
- Born: 31 December 1970 (age 55)
- Occupation: Jurist; Prosecutor
- Known for: Prosecutor following the 2011 Norway attacks

Inga Bejer Engh (born 31 December 1970) is a Norwegian jurist, former prosecutor, and Children's ombudsman between 2018 and 2024. Together with Svein Holden she prosecuted terror suspect Anders Behring Breivik in the 2012 trial following the 2011 Norway attacks.

== Early life and career ==
Engh is educated Candidate of Law. Following law school she worked with international law for the United Nations in New York City. Upon return to Norway her first job was at Drammen District Court later Oslo District Court and Asker and Bærum Police District. At 32 she began working as a prosecutor. She has prosecuted several major criminal cases including the much publicized methanol distribution case in Østfold in the early 2000s, a case where a man received ten years prison after having thrown acid on his wife, several major drugs and sexual abuse cases. She also prosecuted Tore W. Tvedt, one of the witnesses in the Breivik case, in 2002.

When Edward Snowden was awarded the Ossietzky Prize for 2016, but had no guarantees against being extradited to the United States if he traveled to Norway to receive it, the case came up in Oslo District Court in the form of a private lawsuit against the Ministry of Justice. On 27 June 2016, Engh dismissed the case and also ordered Snowden to pay the state's legal costs of NOK 7,000.

In 2018, Engh was appointed the Children's Ombudsman of Norway for a period of six years, succeeding Anne Lindboe. Her term ended in April 2024, and in November 2023 she was appointed assistant director of the Norwegian Police Security Service.

== Personal life ==
Inga Bejer Engh is married and has two young boys. The youngest was born in 2009 and was very premature but has sustained no lasting medical problems. Her decision to become a lawyer was made in the gymnasium (Norwegian equivalent to high school, now called videregående).
