= Døvigen =

Døvigen is a Norwegian surname. Notable people with the surname include:

- Kjersti Døvigen (1943–2021), Norwegian actress
- Ulrikke Hansen Døvigen (born 1971), Norwegian actress, daughter of Kjersti
