= Arne Lyng =

Norwegian district court judge (born 1962)

- Born: 29 September 1962 (age 63); Darmstadt, West Germany
- Occupations: jurist, judge
- Known for: Judge during the trial of Anders Behring Breivik

Arne Lyng (born 29 September 1962 in Darmstadt, Germany) is a Norwegian district court judge currently employed at Oslo District Court.

On 23 December 2011 it became known that he, along with Wenche Elizabeth Arntzen, was to preside over the criminal trial of Anders Behring Breivik, who was accused of terrorism and mass murder following the 2011 Norway attacks. The trial lasted from 16 April until 22 June 2012.

== Background ==
Lyng has previously worked as deputy judge (Norwegian: dommerfullmektig) at Vesterålen District Court, advisor and special advisor for the Financial Supervisory Authority of Norway, chief secretary for the Bank Act Commission, and as lawyer in Law Firm Lyng & Co.

Lyng is the nephew of Jon Lyng, defense counsel in the trial of Arne Treholt.
