= With Their Backs to the World =

Book by Åsne Seierstad

With Their Backs to The World: Portraits of Serbia
- First edition (Norwegian)
- Author: Åsne Seierstad
- Original title: Med ryggen mot verden: Portretter fra Serbia
- Translator: Sindre Kardtvedt
- Language: Norwegian
- Genre: Non-fiction
- Publisher: Cappelen Damm
- Publication date: 2000
- Publication place: Norway
- Pages: 340 pp (paperback)
- ISBN: 978-1-84408-214-8 (paperback)
- Followed by: The Bookseller of Kabul

With Their Backs to The World: Portraits of Serbia (Norwegian: Med ryggen mot verden: Portretter fra Serbia) is a book by Norwegian journalist Åsne Seierstad.

While working for the national Norwegian television network, Åsne Seierstad was in Yugoslavia (today's Serbia) during the Kosovo War and NATO bombing of the country of 1999. She also recorded the events of the democratic revolution which overthrew Slobodan Milošević in October 2000.

In her book, Seierstad follows thirteen people from different parts of the country who represent a rough cross-section of Serbia - people of varying backgrounds and political beliefs. She describes their lives and records their thoughts, providing a degree of insight into Serbia's national psyche and its historical causes. She visited Serbia three times during the book. Firstly in 1999, after the NATO bombing campaign, when Milosevic is still in power and when UN sanctions are still in place. She visited again during the democratic revolution in 2000. Her final visit came in 2004 after the assassination of the Serbian Prime Minister Zoran Djindjic and the deportation of alleged war criminals (including Slobodan Milosevic himself) to the ICTY in The Hague, with most of her characters feeling disillusioned with the country's lack of progress.

As well as talking about ordinary Serbians, including a displaced Serbian family from Kosovo, Seierstad also writes about her interviews with famous Serbian politicians from both Milošević's Socialist Party and the Democratic parties of Serbia, as well as television personalities and the musician Rambo Amadeus.

== Critical reception ==
Dusko Doder of The Guardian wrote: "It is highly original, and the best single introduction to contemporary Serbia."
