= Shah Muhammad Rais =

Shah Muhammad Rais (born April 4, 1954) from Afghanistan is the real life Bookseller of Kabul as written of in Åsne Seierstad’s book from 2002.

During a trip to Scandinavia in November 2005, he declared his wife and children were seeking asylum in either Norway or Sweden, as political refugees. Things revealed about him in Seierstad's book had made his family's life unsafe in Afghanistan, especially after the book has been published as bootlegs in Persian.

He has published his own version of the story, Once upon a time there was a bookseller in Kabul.
