= One Hundred and One Days =

2003 book by Åsne Seierstad

One Hundred And One Days: A Baghdad Journal
- First edition (Norwegian)
- Author: Åsne Seierstad
- Original title: Hundre og én dag
- Language: Norwegian
- Genre: Non-fiction
- Publisher: Cappelen Damm
- Publication date: 2003
- Publication place: Norway
- Pages: 336pp (paperback)
- ISBN: 1-84408-140-0 (paperback)
- OCLC: 56696983
- Preceded by: The Bookseller of Kabul
- Followed by: Angel of Grozny: Inside Chechnya

One Hundred And One Days: A Baghdad Journal (Norwegian: Hundre og én dag) is a non-fiction book by Norwegian journalist Åsne Seierstad.

From January until April 2003 — for one hundred and one days — Åsne Seierstad worked as a reporter in Baghdad for Scandinavian, German, and Dutch media. Through her articles and live television coverage she reported on the events in Iraq before, during and after the US-led invasion of Iraq. In her book, Seierstad focuses on the everyday lives of normal Iraqi citizens, providing a rare insight into their daily lives under the constant threat of attack first from the Iraqi government and later from American bombs, as well as describing the frustration felt by journalists in their attempts to discern truth from propaganda.
