= Wenche Elizabeth Arntzen =

Norwegian lawyer and judge

Justice of the Supreme Court of Norway
- Incumbent
- Assumed office 29 September 2014
- Monarch: Harald V

Personal details
- Born: June 26, 1959 (age 67) Oslo, Norway
- Education: University of Oslo
- Known for: Presiding judge during the trial of Anders Behring Breivik

Wenche Elizabeth Arntzen (born 26 June 1959) is a Norwegian lawyer and judge. She was appointed to the Supreme Court of Norway on 20 June 2014, having previously been a judge at the Oslo District Court.

From 16 April until 22 June 2012, she presided over the trial of Anders Behring Breivik following the 2011 Norway attacks, assisted by district court judge Arne Lyng and three lay judges.

== Background ==
Arntzen began her career as a consultant at the Ministry of Justice and the Police's Legal Issues section. From 1989 to 2003, she was a lawyer at the Office of the Attorney General of Norway. She attained to barrister, a lawyer with access to work with Supreme Court cases, in 1993. She then entered the law firm Kluge as a lawyer and partner. Since 2007 Arntzen has been a judge at Oslo District Court.

Wenche Elizabeth Arntzen belongs to a family with many jurists. Among them is her grandfather, former Director of Public Prosecutions in Norway (Norwegian: riksadvokat) Sven Arntzen. Her father was the barrister, Andreas Arntzen. She is also married to a jurist and is a cousin of psychology professor Erik Arntzen.

Since 2009, Arntzen has been a member of the Norwegian Parliamentary Intelligence Oversight Committee. She has also worked at the University of Oslo as commissioned lecturer in ethics.

== The Breivik trial ==
During the opening of the 2012 trial against Anders Behring Breivik, Breivik claimed that judge Arntzen was a personal friend of Hanne Harlem, sister of former prime minister Gro Harlem Brundtland, whom Breivik on day four of the trial testified had been a principal target for execution during his shooting spree at Utøya island—and whom he had wanted to decapitate on video, Al Qaeda-style—but to the question from Arntzen whether this constituted a formal assertion of conflict of interest, Breivik's main defence counsel Geir Lippestad, after cursorily conferring with Breivik, replied that it was not.
