= Partiet Sentrum =

Party of the Centre Partiet Sentrum
- Abbreviation: S
- Leader: Geir Lippestad
- Founded: 24 September 2020
- Split from: Christian Democratic Party; Labour Party
- Headquarters: c/o Advokatfirmaet Lippestad AS; Sehesteds gate 6; 0164 Oslo
- Youth wing: Centre Youth
- Ideology: Centrism; Environmentalism
- Political position: Centre to centre-left
- Colours: Red
- Storting: 0 / 169
- Municipal Councils: 7 / 9,344

Website
- partietsentrum.no

Partiet Sentrum (abbr. S; lit. 'Party of the Centre'; Northern Sami: Bellodat Guovddáš) is a registered political party in Norway. The party was established in 2020 after a split in the Christian Democratic Party. Its formation was spearheaded by former Oslo city councilor Geir Lippestad of the Labour Party, who was elected as the party's first leader. The party's platform focuses on climate policy. It has yet to win a seat in the national Storting, but a number of its members have been elected at the municipal level.

== History ==
The party was established on 24 September 2020 by former county leaders from the Christian Democratic Party (KrF) and former Oslo city councilor Geir Lippestad of the Labour Party. The KrF county leaders left their party after an internal split between the KrF's left and right factions, in which the latter won. Lippestad led the initiative to form the party and was elected its inaugural leader at the party's founding congress. The party later received further defectors from the Labour Party, the Socialist Left Party, the Conservative Party, and the Green Party.

In December 2020, the party secured enough signatures to run lists in all counties for the 2021 parliamentary election. It officially registered as a political party in January 2021.

Partiet Sentrum was measured in opinion polls in the winter of 2020–2021 between 0.0 and 0.7 per cent support. In the spring of 2021, Norstat conducted a nationwide survey commissioned by the Center Party, to answer how the party fared before the parliamentary elections in 2021. Two percent of the 1,000 respondents answered "yes" to the question of whether they considered voting for the party in the autumn elections. Nine percent answered "maybe", and 13% answered "do not know".

The 2021 parliamentary election was held on 13 September. The party received 0.3% of the popular vote in the election and no seats in the Storting. After the election, the party advocated a change in government.

== Platform ==
Partiet Sentrum's platform focuses on climate policy. It describes itself as a bloc-independent centrist party based on the United Nations' Sustainable Development Goals and Universal Declaration of Human Rights. However, despite being bloc-independent, the party states that it would support a red–green government. The party also advocates the phasing out of oil operations on the Norwegian continental shelf by 2035, and supports Norway accepting more refugees.

The party has been described as being on the centre to centre-left of the political spectrum.

== Youth wing ==
The party's youth organization is Centre Youth.

== List of party congresses ==
- Founding congress held in 2020
- First congress held online 8–9 May 2021
- Second congress held in Oslo 19–28 May 2022
- Third congress held 29–30 April 2023
- Fourth congress held 27–28 April 2024

== Election results ==
=== Storting ===
Election	Leader	Votes	%	Seats	+/–	Position	Status
2021	Geir Lippestad	7,836	0.26	0 / 169	New	14th	Extra-parliamentary
2025	Geir Lippestad	5,701	0.18	0 / 169	0	▼15th	Extra-parliamentary
