= Abdul Rauf Mohammad =

Afghan former Taliban politician (born 1959)

Abdul Rauf Mohammad عبد الرءوف محمد
- Born: 1959 (age 66–67); Afghanistan
- Occupations: Politician, former Mujahideen leader

Abdul Rauf Mohammad (born 1959) is an Afghan former acting Taliban government minister. He lived in Norway from 2000 until being deported in 2014. Der Spiegel reported, in December 2016, that Abdul Rauf applied for political asylum in Germany.

== Taliban Minister ==
Mohammad first moved from Afghanistan to Pakistan in 1978, where he took education in law with a focus on Islamic law. He claims to have joined the mujahideen in 1985 after the Soviet invasion of Afghanistan, and to have served until 1991. He was reportedly present at the grand meeting in 1996 that elected Mullah Omar leader of the Taliban, after which he himself joined the movement. Mohammad thereafter served as acting Minister of Health intermittently between 1996 and 1999, and claims to have met Osama bin Laden several times during Taliban government meetings.

== Asylum in Norway ==
Mohammad was granted asylum in Norway with his wife and children in 2000 after claiming his life was in danger to the UNHCR in Pakistan, and he subsequently became a valued informant to the intelligence services. In 2001 he had four additional extended family members, including a brother and sister granted family reunification in Norway after pressure from the Norwegian Police Security Service (PST), despite neither of them fulfilling the criteria for family reunification. He has eight children.

Based in Drammen, Mohammad founded a mosque, while he had a job as a bus driver. In 2009 after growing concerns, PST went to action against 25 young Islamists who were part of a circle thought to have planned terror against Norway, and of which Mohammad was thought to have been the imam and mentor. Some of the Islamists were later involved in Profetens Ummah. Mohammad reportedly called for jihad in videos on the internet, and has stated that he is proud to be called an Islamist. The previous year, in 2008 he was sentenced to 120 days in jail for violence and death threats against his own daughter. Mohammad was formally expelled from Norway in 2011 with reference to "fundamental national interests", and he was secretly arrested and deported from Norway in July 2014.

== Plaintiff in trial in which supreme court upheld deportation ==
In 2015 Mohammad sued the Norwegian state, demanding to be allowed back in Norway, but lost the case in the Oslo District Court. His family remains in Norway.

In 2016 the Supreme Court of Norway upheld previous decisions of deporting Mohammad.

== Attempt to live in Germany ==
Der Spiegel reported, on December 16, 2016, that, several weeks earlier, Abdul Rauf, and his family, had been intercepted by German border officials, for travelling on forged documents. He then applied for asylum, a request turned down due to his 2014 deportation from Norway. He was then deported to Afghanistan, via Saudi Arabia.
