= Vibeke Hein Bæra =

Norwegian lawyer

- Born: July 29, 1964 (age 62)
- Occupation: Lawyer

Vibeke Hein Bæra (born 29 July 1964) is a Norwegian lawyer. She was a defence lawyer for Anders Behring Breivik in his trial for his role in the 2011 Norway attacks.

== Biography ==
From 1992 to 1999 Bæra, who hails from the city Porsgrunn in Telemark, was a lawyer for Lippestad AS law firm. In 2011 she returned to the firm as partner. She has also worked as police lawyer at Telemark Police District (2000–2010) and as regional director of the Labour Inspection Authority for Southern Norway (2010–2011). She had applied for a 12-month leave of absence but this was denied her. She had initially received a 3-month leave, then 6-months, however the national director of the Labour Inspection Authority decided that extending that further was indefensible, ostensibly because Bæra hadn't given a clear indication that she would in fact return to her former job once the leave of absence was at an end. In an October 2011 news article about the dispute, two middle management leaders who had worked under her praised her leadership qualities.

During the Breivik trial, a brother of a victim killed in the attacks threw a shoe at Breivik, which instead hit her. Following the trial against Breivik, Beira told the media that she had received death threats during that assignment. The information came to her via friends of her children that a price had been placed on her head. She had also other threats come to her and cooperated with the police in their effort to keep her family safe.
