= Vigrid (Norway) =

Far-right Norwegian racial paganism group

- Formation: 1998
- Type: Neopagan, neo-Nazi
- Location: Norway
- Leader: Tore W. Tvedt
- Website: vigrid.net

Vigrid is a Norwegian neopagan sect founded by Tore W. Tvedt in 1998 that combines racial theories with Norse mythology. The group is widely regarded as neo-Nazi, and is considered to have an "extremely racist and violent ideology" by the Norwegian Police Security Service (PST). The group is known for their ceremonies and rituals including "baptisms". In 2009, the group registered as a political party and ran for the parliamentary election in one county, receiving 179 votes (0.007% of the votes cast). The group was disbanded from 2009 to 2013, but has since resumed activities in a limited form, and "now orients its online operations towards an alt-right audience".

== Ideology and activities ==
Vigrid was originally inspired by William Luther Pierce and the National Alliance after founder Tore Tvedt lived for some years in the United States in the 1990s where he regularly met with Pierce, Tvedt in 1994 having come to believe that he himself had been chosen as a prophet of the Norse god Odin. Tvedt has also been seen to have been influenced by the Wotansvolk group of David Lane.

Vigrid states that it wants to save the divine Aryan race from white genocide, and that this is part of what is described as the battle of Ragnarök in Norse mythology. They therefore want to destroy what they claim to be the current "Jew and Jötunn"-controlled system, while worshipping the gods Odin, Thor and Freyja. The Elder Edda serves as their holy text; Pierce's The Turner Diaries is also frequently invoked. The group denies the Holocaust which it denotes as "HoloCa$h", and consider Adolf Hitler as Europe's "savior". The group also supports the legacy of Nasjonal Samling and Vidkun Quisling.

In its ceremonies, the group performs "baptisms" (into skiri), "confirmations" ("between fire and ice"), and initiates "priests" known as either volve (female) or gode (male). The group aims to be a decentralised network of local groups and individuals who function either openly or in secret, while educating natural leaders to be self-sufficient. Most of those "baptised" are youth aged 15 to 25 years old, about equal between males and females. In 2012 Tvedt estimated that he had performed about 650 ceremonies for around 450 to 500 people. He however encourages followers to hide their connection to Vigrid, to avoid trouble with the police.

According to the police, several of Vigrid's members have been involved in aggravated assaults. Tvedt has encouraged his followers including youth to carry weapons of self-defence against immigrant gangs and to conduct fight and shooting training in legal forms. In 2000, two Vigrid-members stabbed two Africans in Stavanger. One former Vigrid member who later became a member of SOS Rasisme claimed that weapons, drugs and alcohol are not uncommon in parties within the group, although the group's inner core are teetotalers, opposing drinking. In 2004 several of the ten people who were arrested for a theft of 128 weapons from the Jørstadmoen military base were reported to be members of Vigrid. Tvedt was himself in 2002 prosecuted for possession of a sawed-off shotgun and for assaults against two police officers.

In 2003, PST said they feared Vigrid was developing in a violent direction, and after having performed over 100 "baptisms" within less than a year PST said they would launch a nationwide offensive against the organisation. After Vigrid had created a network of around 200 members, "one day in 2004, agents from all 26 field offices paid personal visits to each of Vigrid's members, many of whom were teenagers living with their parents. The investigators continued this tactic for several months, until about 60% of Vigrid quit the group voluntarily." PST's predecessor POT had also previously "warned" 60 members of the group after it conducted weapons training for its young members. Tvedt has later claimed that he and anyone he had been in contact with were routinely persecuted by the police, and that it almost destroyed Vigrid in the mid-2000s.

== 2009 parliamentary election ==
On 18 December 2008, Vigrid delivered the required list of 500 signatures to the county of Buskerud to be able to participate in the parliamentary election (in Buskerud only) on 14 September 2009. The list was approved by the electoral committee on 27 May 2009, after it had verified that the 500 signatures were willingly given by Norwegian citizens with the right to vote in the parliamentary election in Buskerud. The first candidate was Thorgrim O. Bredesen. It was later claimed that several of those who had signed its list had not known that they had signed for Vigrid. The list received 179 votes in Buskerud (0.007% of the total vote). In the informal high school elections it received 0.2% of the nationwide vote, while in one school where the party had participated in a school debate it received 10% of the vote.

== Conflict over use of heritage site ==
A 7 August 2012 article in the local newspaper Gjengangeren, where Tore Tvedt described how Vigrid uses the heritage site Borre mound cemetery in Vestfold for their initiation ceremonies, caused an uproar among local politicians, including the mayor of Horten. The municipal presidency unanimously decided to issue a declaration condemning Vigrid's use of the site. Vigrid is accused of abusing the park and the document demands that the organization ceases to use the area. The politicians argue that "Vigrid's racial theories and political profile are completely at variance with the heritage values we believe the park to represent." The declaration also promised that the presidency will coordinate measures between the proprietor and the administration of the area as well as other public authorities to prevent future political misuse. Labour Party politician Nils Henning Hontvedt, who initiated the declaration, told Gjengangeren in a 21 August article titled "Declaring war on Vigrid" that were it not for the events of 22 July 2011 they would possibly have let the matter slide. Hontvedt also conceded that freedom of expression considerations and the absence of clear legislation may make it difficult to prevent Vigrid from using the park in the future.

== See also ==
- Neopaganism in Scandinavia
