= Geir Lippestad =

Norwegian lawyer, politician and social activist

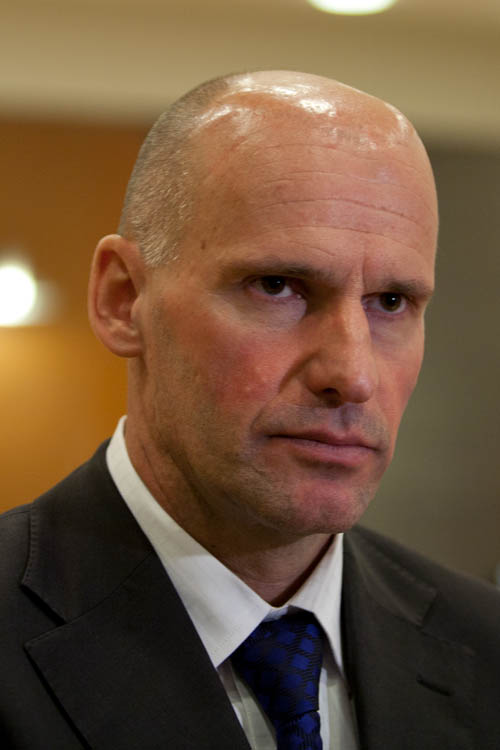

Oslo City Commissioner for Trade and Ownership
- In office 21 October 2015 – 19 December 2017
- Governing Mayor: Raymond Johansen
- Preceded by: Hallstein Bjercke
- Succeeded by: Kjetil Lund

Personal details
- Born: 7 June 1964 (age 62) Hønefoss, Buskerud, Norway
- Party: Labour (before 2020); Sentrum (2020-present)
- Spouse: Signe Lippestad (née Husebye)
- Children: 7
- Education: University of Oslo
- Occupation: Lawyer
- Known for: Attorney for Anders Behring Breivik
- Website: Corporate Website

Geir Lippestad (born 7 June 1964) is a Norwegian lawyer, politician and social activist. He is known for his involvement in several high-profile legal cases, and for starting the political party Sentrum in 2020.

As a criminal appellate lawyer, he first became known in 2001 when he acted as defence counsel following the murder of Benjamin Hermansen.

In 2011 he became known internationally for being the lead counsel for the perpetrator of the 2011 Norway attacks, Anders Behring Breivik. Since 2011 Lippestad has expanded his law-firm, handling several high-profile cases, as well as speaking at public events. He is also noted for being an outspoken proponent of progressive causes; from 2013 to 2020 he was chairman of the left-wing think tank Agenda. From 2015 to 2019, he was a member of the Oslo City Council, representing the Labour Party. He later left the Labour Party to form a new political party called Sentrum.

== Early life and education ==
Geir Lippestad was born 7 June 1964 in Hønefoss, in the Ringerike district in Buskerud county. His family name originates from Lippestad farm in Tomter in Østfold. His great grandfather Carl Thorvald Lippestad left the farm and relocated to Oslo at the end of the 19th century. Lippestad's parents, originally from Nordstrand in Oslo had moved to the village of Heradsbygd outside of Hønefoss, where his father worked as an engineer. When Lippestad was six years old, the family of five moved back to Nordstrand. After finishing high school he enrolled in the University of Oslo, studying law. He obtained the cand.jur. degree in the autumn of 1990.

== Legal career ==
After graduating and receiving his law degree in 1990, Lippestad was employed at a small law-firm in Harestua, a small rural town outside of Oslo. Later he moved to the Association of Norwegian Insurance Companies, where he worked as a legal counsel. Afterwards he, along with a colleague, started a private law-firm based in Nedre Slottsgate street in down-town Oslo. It was while working here that Lippestad first came to the national spotlight, when he represented Ole Nicolai Kvisler, who was later convicted of participation in the racially motivated murder of Benjamin Hermansen in 2002. Kvisler received a 17-year prison sentence.

Three years later, Lippestad left the firm when he was appointed secretary-general at the National Association of the Hearing Impaired (Norwegian: Hørselshemmedes Landsforbund), Lippestad applied to this position due to his daughter Rebekka, who was born with a severe hearing impairment. In 2009 he was one of the contenders for the position of Gender Equality and Anti-Discrimination Ombud, but lost to Sunniva Ørstavik. He then decided to return to private practice and in 2010 he opened his own law-firm called Advokatkontoret Lippestad AS.

=== The 22 July trial ===
In July 2011, he was appointed as defence counsel for Anders Behring Breivik, the perpetrator of the 2011 Norway attacks, after the latter specifically requested him. His co-lead counsel was Vibeke Hein Bæra, and they were assisted by assistant counsels Tord Jordet and Odd Ivar Grøn, both of whom are employed at his law firm.

Before the trial Lippestad told the French newspaper Le Monde: "I feel I have lost my soul in this case [...] I hope to get it back once it's over – and that it will be in the same condition as before." At the trial, Lippestad chose not to argue for the innocence of his client, although Breivik himself had specifically requested to be acquitted due to the legal principle of necessity. In his closing arguments, Lippestad asked only for his client to be found sane and to be sentenced leniently without mentioning the subject of culpability. In a bizarre moment of confusion, the presiding judge Wenche Elizabeth Arntzen asked Lippestad if he would request an acquittal for his client, to which Lippestad replied that he would not. Breivik then interceded and told Lippestad; "You've got to do it!" after which Lippestad formally requested an acquittal.

Although Lippestad successfully argued before the court that his client was legally sane and competent, Breivik was found guilty and sentenced to the maximum penalty of 21 years in containment. The prosecution had asked for Breivik to be formally acquitted and found legally insane, and sentenced to mandatory psychiatric confinement. This was rejected by the court. After the sentencing of Breivik, Lippestad formally transferred the legal responsibility of his client within the law-firm to Tord Jordet, thereby ceasing to be his official defence attorney.

=== After Breivik ===
Following the Breivik case, Lippestad experienced a significant increase in financial revenue. He expanded his law-firm, hired new staff and opened another branch in Skien, which would serve as the main office, in addition to the office in down-town Oslo. In January 2014, the law firm Lippestad signed a contract with the Norwegian Police Federation, the trade union organizing all employees in the police sector in Norway. The agreement included assisting with all types of legal issues that members would have. It also included legal representation in cases where police officers are accused of criminal offences, as well as Lippestad holding lectures and speaking at events organized by the Police Federation.

== Activism ==
=== Politics ===
Lippestad has been an active member of the Norwegian Labour Party, and deputy chair of its Nordstrand local chapter. In April 2013, he was invited as a keynote speaker at the annual Labour party congress. During his speech to the delegates, he spoke about humanity and human values. He sharply criticised the treatment of Roma people in the city of Oslo.

In December 2013, Lippestad was appointed chairman of the new left-wing think tank Agenda. The think-tank was established with support from the trade union centre as well as the Labour party and intended as a left-wing counter-weight to the influential liberal think-tank Civita.

In 2014 it was revealed that the Labour Party was considering Lippestad as a mayoral candidate for Oslo in the 2015 local elections due to him being a highly respected person who could possibly rival the popular incumbent conservative mayor Fabian Stang. The Labour party had not had a mayor of Oslo in 20 years, and a majority of the Oslo chapter felt that Lippestad possessed the "broad appeal" necessary to pose serious challenge to mayor Stang. In September 2014 however, Lippestad told the party that he did not want to be nominated. In the 2015 Norwegian local elections he was instead elected as a member of Oslo city council. He also served as Oslo City Commissioner for Trade and Ownership from 2015 to 2017.

In 2020, he co-founded a new political party named Sentrum (The Centre). By December 2020 the party had collected the 5000 signatures needed to take part in the 2021 Norwegian parliamentary election.

=== Other ===
An outspoken advocate for the rights of people with physical disabilities, especially children, Lippestad was in 2014 awarded the "Defender of Human Life" award by the Pro-Life organisation Menneskeverd. In its citation, the jury wrote that the Lippestad couple reflects a set of values where respect and an unwavering belief in human life, no matter what situation you are in, is the basis. At the event, Lippestad called for a reduction in the number of abortions. He also spoke out against what he believes is an expectation from society that parents should abort fetuses with genetic disorders. He later echoed his statements in an interview with Dagbladet, claiming that there is a lack of options for mothers who wish to give birth to a child with disability. He also stated that: "Many are aborted almost automatically, and that is very sad."

In 2013 he was appointed chairman of the Kirkens Familievern Foundation, a charity which aims to promote family values, as well as offer assistance to families or couples. Its activities also includes strengthening the family, marriage, parenting, relationship and singles' position in the church and society. He is chairman of Youth For Understanding in Norway, an organization which promotes international peace and tolerance, by exchange programs.

== Personal life ==
Geir Lippestad is married to registered nurse Signe Lippestad (née Husebye). Combined they have eight children, two of them together. Lippestad has two from his previous marriage, and his wife has four from her previous marriage. The entire family resides in the Nordstrand suburb in southern Oslo.

Two of the children were born with disabilities and one of them, 16-year-old Rebekka, was critically ill early in 2012, in the midst of Lippestad's preparations for the Breivik trial. She pulled through the crisis which also coincided with Lippestad's wife giving birth to a baby girl, Mille Madicken. Rebekka died on June 14, 2013.

=== Controversy ===
In the aftermath of the 22-July trial, Lippestad caused controversy when he wrote a book about the trial called "That which we may stand for" (Norwegian: Det vi kan stå for). In the book Lippestad included full conversations which he had between himself and Breivik, which took place within the prison in full confidentiality. The book caused fierce reaction and condemnation from the legal establishment in Norway, some calling the book illegal. Lippestad defended himself and the book by stating that Breivik had absolved him of the attorney-client privilege, as well as given him permission to write the book.

Many high-profile attorneys as well as legal scholars were of the opinion that Lippestad had breached the attorney-client privilege as well being disloyal to his client. The leader of the Norwegian Bar Association Berit Reiss-Andersen accused Lippestad of exploiting his role as a defence attorney in order to create "another platform for himself in the public sphere". Other lawyers called the book "social pornography" and "an obvious breach of ethics". The Association of Defence Attorneys (Norwegian: Forsvarergruppen) unanimously voted to refer the case to the Bar Association's Main Board for possible sanctions. The board subsequently ordered Lippestad to send a formal reply explaining his case within three weeks, which he did. After formally hearing the case, the Main Board unanimously ruled that Lippestad had not breached legal ethics, thereby avoiding sanctions.

== Honours and awards ==
- Finansavisen: Achievement Of The Year 2011.
- Verdens Gang: Person Of The Year 2012
