= The Bookseller of Kabul =

2002 book by Åsne Seierstad

- First edition (Norwegian)
- Author: Åsne Seierstad
- Original title: Bokhandleren i Kabul
- Translator: Ingrid Christophersen
- Language: Norwegian
- Genre: Non-fiction
- Publisher: Cappelen Damm
- Publication date: 2002
- Publication place: Norway
- Pages: 276pp (paperback)
- ISBN: 1-84408-047-1 (paperback)
- OCLC: 56460272
- Preceded by: With Their Backs to The World: Portraits of Serbia
- Followed by: One Hundred And One Days: A Baghdad Journal

The Bookseller of Kabul (Norwegian: Bokhandleren i Kabul) is a non-fiction book written by Norwegian journalist Åsne Seierstad, about a bookseller, Shah Muhammad Rais (whose name was changed to Sultan Khan), and his family in Kabul, Afghanistan. The book was published in Norwegian in 2002 and English in 2003. The story takes a novelistic approach, focusing on the characters and detailed aspects of their lives and the difficulties they face. The author's account was later contested, she was sued for defamation (a subsequent appeal cleared her), and the family had to leave the country.

== Background ==
Åsne Seierstad entered Afghanistan two weeks after the September 11 attacks in the US and followed the Northern Alliance into Kabul. Wearing a burka as a disguise, she spent three months living with a bookseller and his family in Kabul, which provided her with a unique opportunity to describe life as ordinary Afghan citizens experienced it.

== Themes ==
As well as giving a historical account of events in Afghanistan as democracy is established, Seierstad focuses on the conditions of Afghan women who still live very much under the domination of men—Afghan traditions allow for polygamy and arranged marriage. She also addresses the conflict between westernization and traditional Islam, and gives an accessible account of Afghanistan's complex recent history under the rule of the USSR, the Taliban and coalition-supported democracy.

== Controversy ==
Following global critical acclaim, many of the book's descriptions were contested by Rais, whose second wife Suraia sued the author in Norway for defamation.

On July 24, 2010, Seierstad was found guilty of defamation and “negligent journalistic practices and ordered to pay damages to Suraia Rais, wife of Shah Muhammad Rais”.

Seierstad won an appeal which overturned the previous ruling and cleared the author and her publisher, Cappelen Damm, of invading the privacy of the Rais family, and concluded that the facts of the book were accurate.

== Effect on the Rais Family ==
During a trip to Scandinavia in November 2005, Rais declared he was seeking asylum in either Norway or Sweden, as a political refugee. He felt things revealed about him in Seierstad's book had made life for him and his family unsafe in Afghanistan, where bootleg versions of the book had been published in Persian.

Rais has published his own version of the story, Once Upon a Time There Was a Bookseller in Kabull which has been translated into English and several other languages.

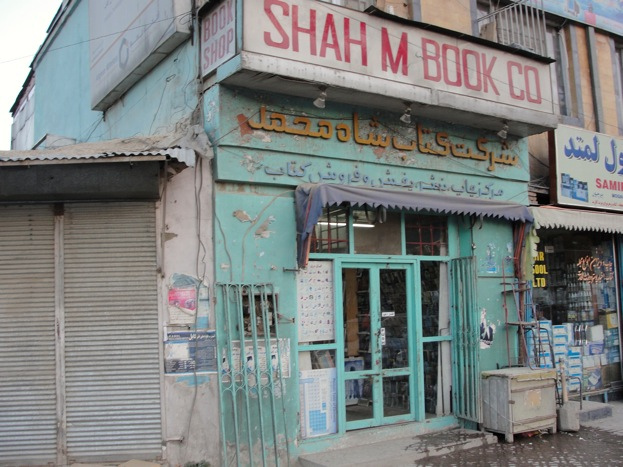
The Shah Mohammad Bookstore in Kabul, on which The Bookseller of Kabul is based

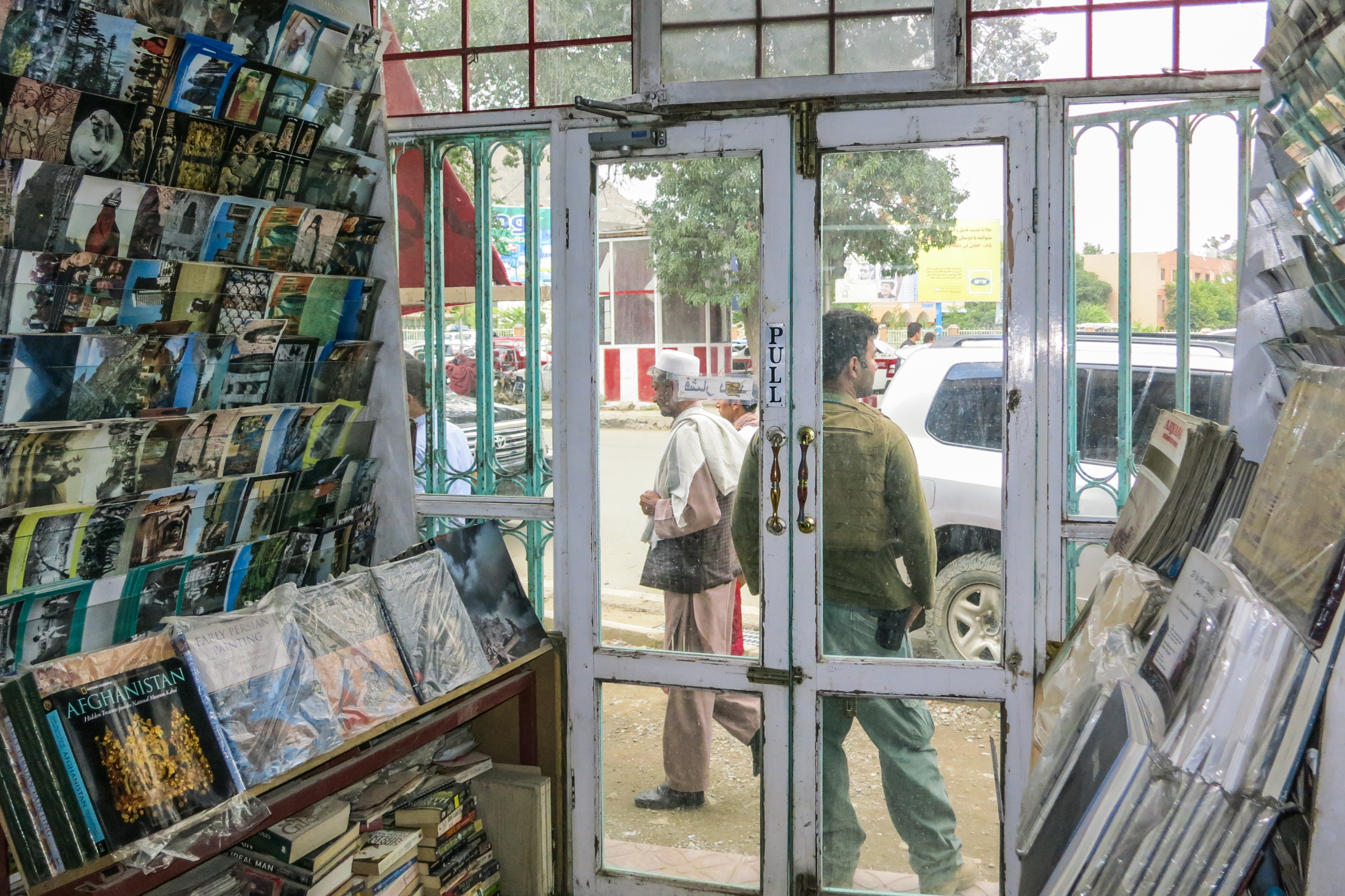
Inside the bookstore in Kabul, 2013

== See also ==
- History of Afghanistan
- Suhaila Seddiqi
- War in Afghanistan (2001–present)
