= Oslo Courthouse =

Courthouse in Oslo, Norway

Coordinates: 59°54′55.642″N 10°44′30.28″E

- Oslo tinghus (in Norwegian)
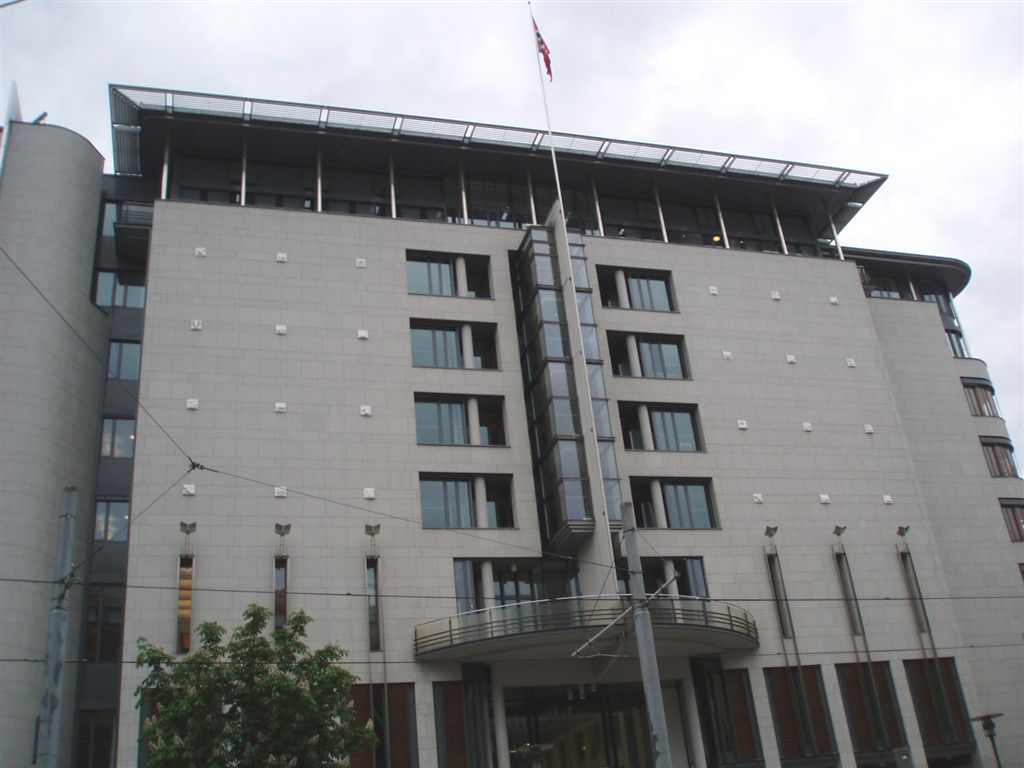
- Oslo Courthouse
- Interactive map of the Oslo Courthouse area

General information
- Architectural style: Postmodern
- Location: Oslo, Norway, C.J. Hambros plass 4
- Inaugurated: 1994

Technical details
- Floor area: 2.800 m^{2}

Design and construction
- Architects: Terje Grønmo, Knut Eriksen and Dagfinn Eng
- Architecture firm: Østgaard Arkitekter AS

Oslo Courthouse (Oslo tinghus) is located at C.J. Hambros plass 4 in downtown Oslo, Norway.

The courthouse houses the two Oslo District Courts; the tingrett which handles civil and criminal cases, and the byfogdembete which considers other enforcement cases such as marriages, bankruptcy, probate, and official notarization.

The postmodern building was designed by Østgaard Arkitekter AS and the architect Terje Grønmo on an assignment from Statsbygg. It was completed in 1994. The building's facade as well as much of the interior is primarily granite.

The building contains 54 courtrooms and 11 adjudication rooms. The inside of the court building's walls are covered with script of the Laws of the Norwegian people (Norske Lov), transposed to demonstrate the difficulty that people have in understanding them.

== Gallery ==
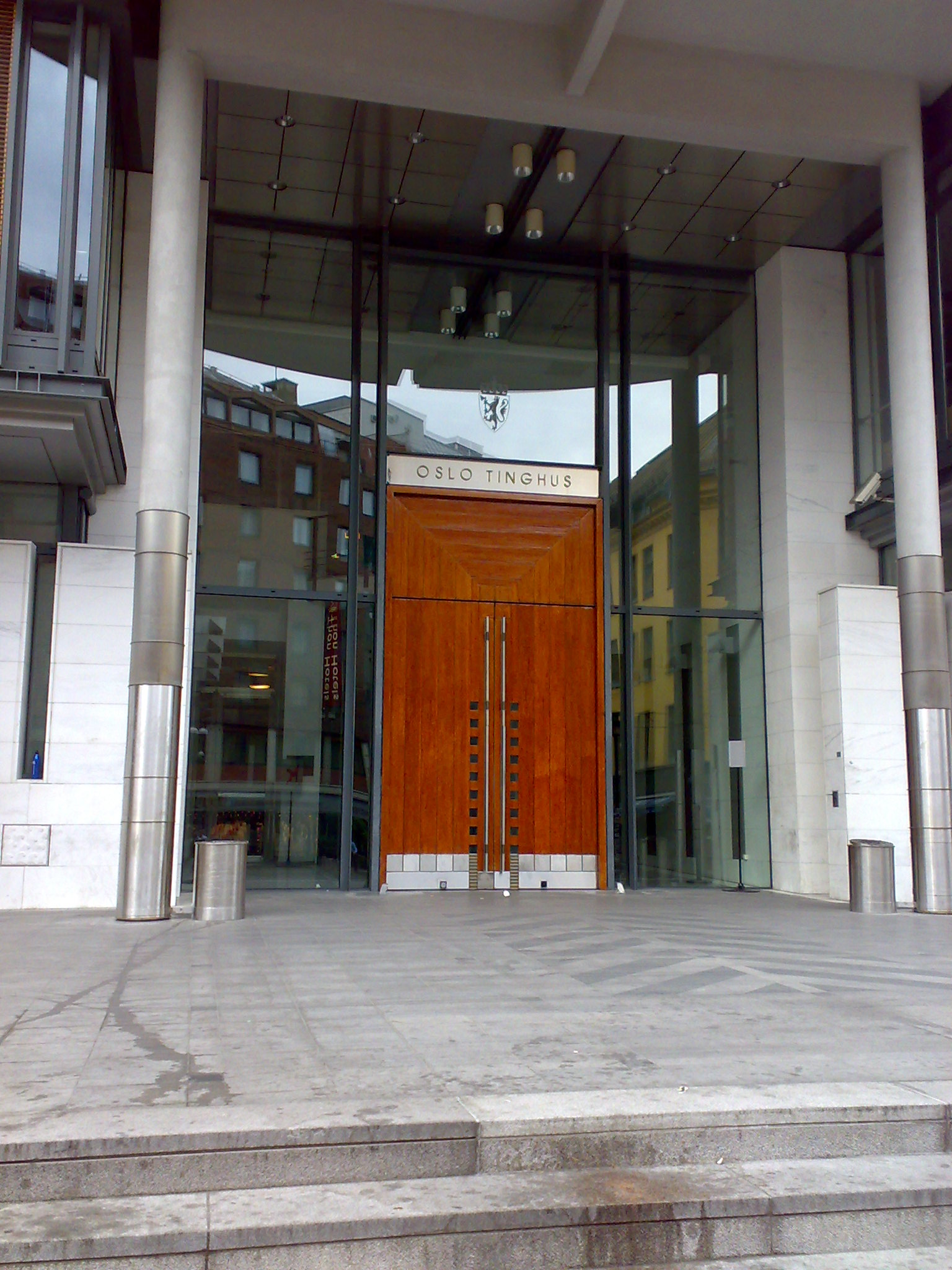
Courthouse entrance

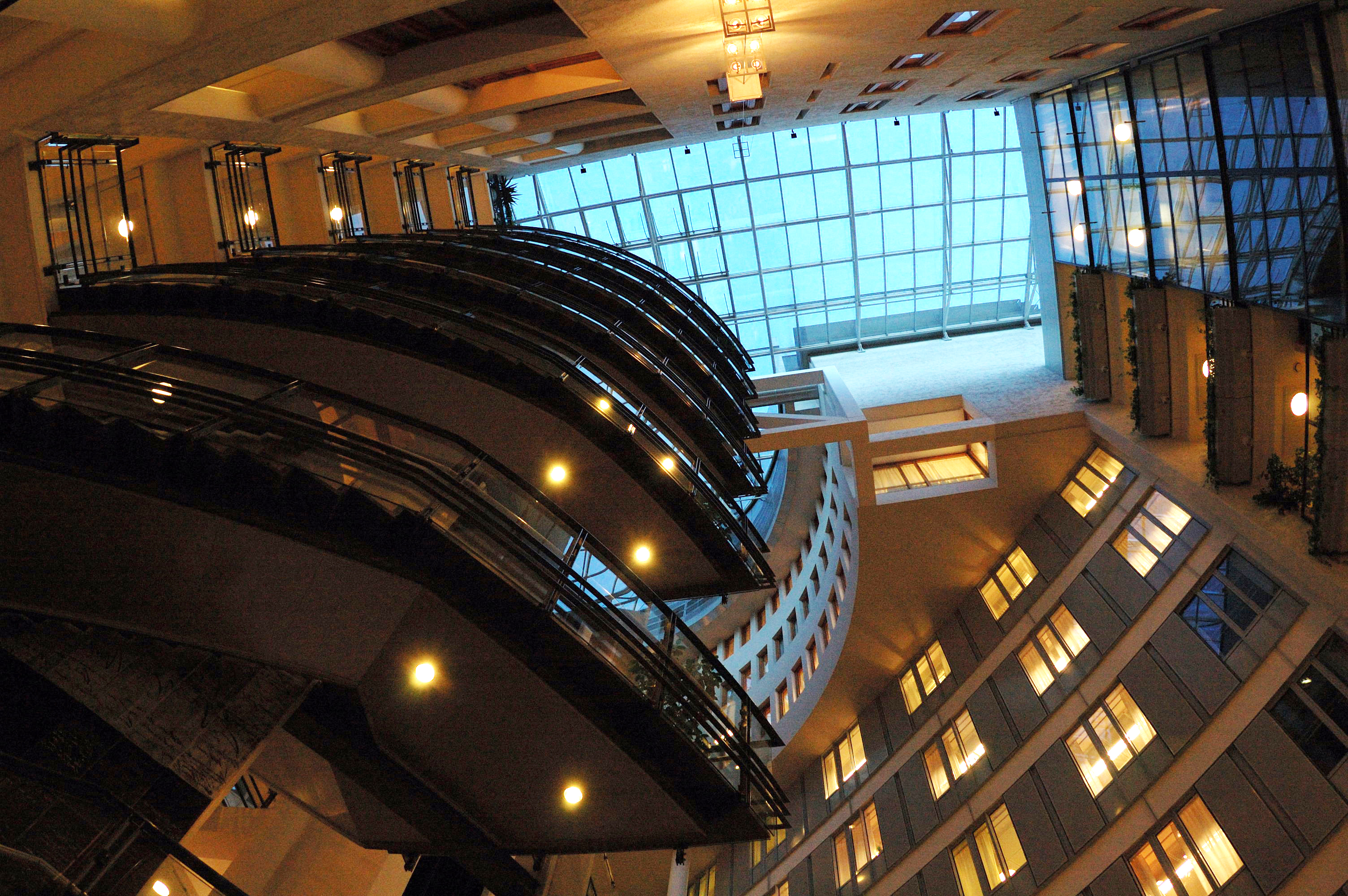
Courthouse interior

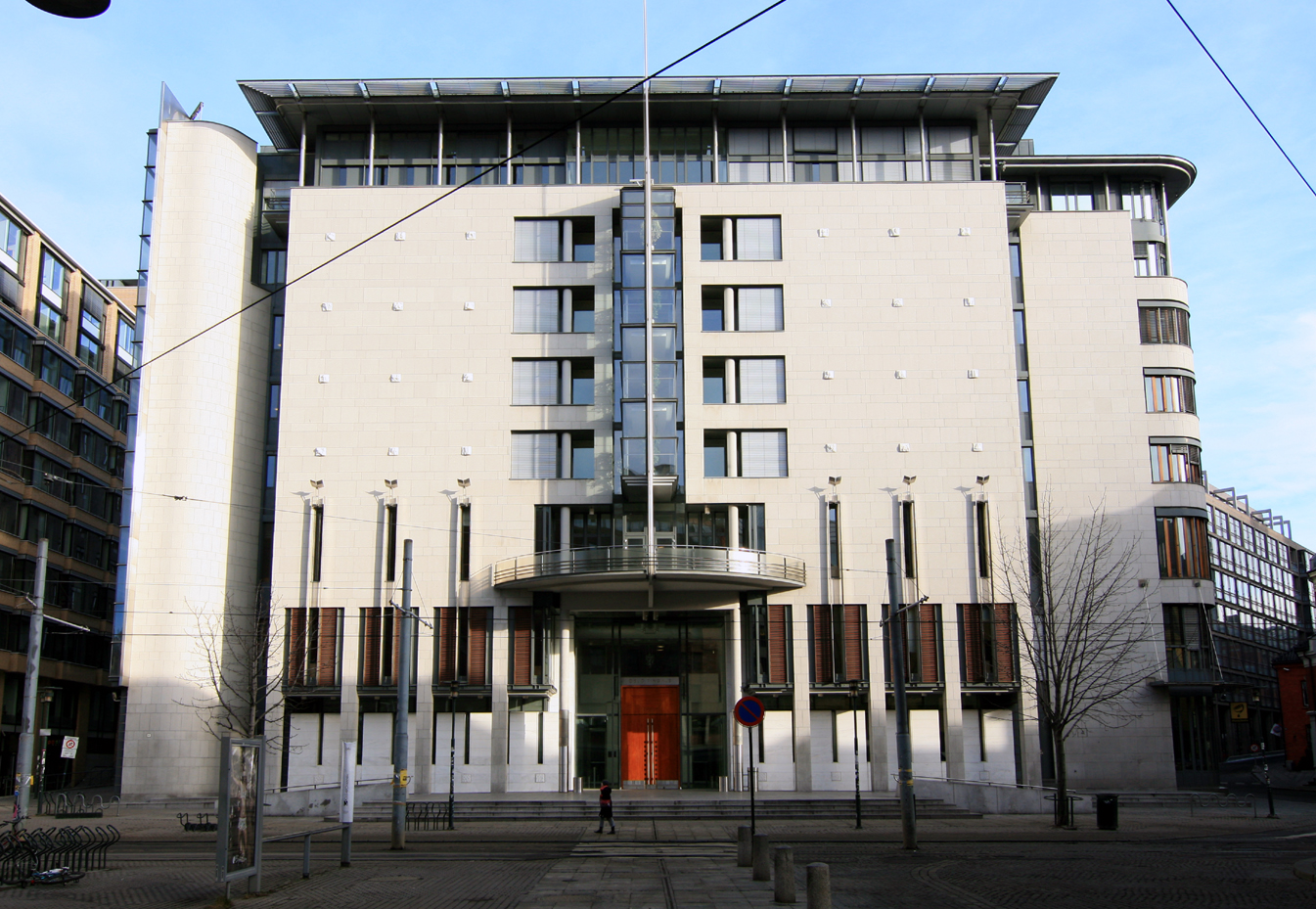
Courthouse exterior
