= Angel of Grozny =

Book by Åsne Seierstad

Angel of Grozny: Inside Chechnya
- First edition (Norwegian)
- Author: Åsne Seierstad
- Translator: Nadia Christensen
- Language: Norwegian
- Genre: Non-fiction
- Publisher: Cappelen Damm
- Publication date: 2007
- Publication place: Norway
- Pages: 352pp (hardback)
- ISBN: 978-1-84408-516-3 (hardback)
- OCLC: 183148951
- Preceded by: One Hundred And One Days: A Baghdad Journal

Angel of Grozny: Inside Chechnya (Norwegian: De krenkede, lit. 'The Offended') is a book by Norwegian journalist Åsne Seierstad published in 2007, which gives an account of everyday life in the war-torn Russian Republic of Chechnya. The book was also printed under the title Angel of Grozny: Orphans of a Forgotten War.

== Background ==
Åsne Seierstad first visited Chechnya in 1994 (aged just 24) during the First Chechen War. In 2006, she returned to the region to examine its progress. In the intervening period, Chechnya had been ravaged by a second civil war after disputed elections were won by Russian-backed Akhmad Kadyrov. During this conflict Russian control of the province was re-established, a process which caused enormous loss of life and widespread destruction of buildings and infrastructure. In 2003, the United Nations described the Chechen capital Grozny as the most destroyed city in the world.

Foreign journalists are not generally allowed into Chechnya, and Seierstad did most of her travelling and research in disguise with her hair dyed.

== Summary ==
Angel of Grozny attempts to give an accessible and impartial account of the complicated historical and political forces at play in the Chechen conflict whilst also describing her encounters with combatants and civilians on both sides. The book features an account of her meeting with Chechen President Ramzan Kadyrov. As well as trying to understand the mindset of the Chechen and Russian people, one of the books key themes is the exposure of corruption in the process of reconstructing Chechnya.

The Angel of Grozny of the book's title is a Chechen woman Hadijat Gatayeva who has turned their home into an orphanage for street children of the war.

== Criticism ==
A criticism often levelled at Åsne Seierstad is her tendency to present personal stories which have not been fully cross-checked for accuracy. Her style, blending historical facts with personal accounts, sometimes blurs the boundary between fact and fiction and language gaps can cause misunderstandings. By focusing on such a small group of individuals to present her case, she fails to prove any abuses or wrongdoing is systemic, and therefore cannot easily hold people to account for their actions.

In Angel of Grozny she goes a step further by writing some sections of the book in the third person. She describes events she did not witness, often in vivid and evocative language which is ill-suited to the actual person telling the story. The Manchester Guardian reviewer described the "blurring of reportage and imagined scenes" as "sometimes uncomfortable".
