= Siv Hallgren =

Norwegian lawyer and civil servant

Siv Hallgren (born 1964) is a Norwegian lawyer and civil servant.

== Career ==
She hails from Bekkelaget in Oslo. She graduated with the cand.jur. degree from the University of Oslo in 1990. She was a prosecutor in Asker and Bærum Police District from 1994 to 2002, then a lawyer. She gained attention as a defender in the NOKAS robbery trial. In 2005, she was made partner in the law firm Elden. Among others, she was a coordinating court-appointed lawyer for victims during the 2011 Norway attacks trial, together with Frode Elgesem and Mette Yvonne Larsen. In late 2016 she was named as chair of the Gjenopptakelseskommisjonen, assuming the chair in 2017.

In her position, she especially received attention for the commission's deliberations of the Baneheia murder trial. She ultimately voted against reopening the conviction of Viggo Kristiansen, but as she was outvoted and the case was reopened, Kristiansen ended up being acquitted.

In 2022 she was named as director of the Norwegian Civil Affairs Authority.

== Personal life ==
Hallgren was formerly married, before marrying Arne Fliflet in 2016.
