= Svein Holden =

Norwegian lawyer

- Born: 23 August 1973 (age 52); Fredrikstad
- Occupations: jurist, prosecutor
- Known for: Prosecutor following the 2011 Norway attacks

Svein Holden (born 23 August 1973) is a Norwegian lawyer having prosecuted several major criminal cases in Norway. Together with prosecutor Inga Bejer Engh Holden prosecuted terror suspect Anders Behring Breivik in the 2012 trial following the 2011 Norway attacks.

Born in Fredrikstad, Holden is educated Candidate of Law from the University of Oslo in 1999. He then worked one year for the Ministry of Justice and the Police. Between 2001 and 2005 he worked at Oslo Police District. Since 2006 he has worked as prosecutor at the Public Prosecutors of Oslo. He was prosecutor during the trial against former Lyn Football sports director Morgan Andersen. During a trial in Fredrikstad District Court in 2010 he accidentally fired a starting gun which he believed not to be loaded. The firing had no adverse consequences. Among other important criminal cases which Holden has prosecuted are the Skøyen case following the murder of Vegard Bjerck in 2008, the district court trial of the gang murder where Stig Millehaugen was sentenced to 21 years of containment (the maximum penalty in Norway, which can possibly be extended indefinitely) for the killing of Mohammed Javed in 2009, and trial following the attempted murder of B Gang leader Ghulam Abbas, which ended with conviction in 2009.
