= Tore Tvedt =

Norwegian far right activist (born 1943)

Tore Wilhelm Tvedt (born 23 March 1943) is a Norwegian neo-Nazi founder of the extremist Vigrid organisation.

In 2006, Tvedt was convicted and received a suspended 45-day jail sentence for violation of the Norwegian racism paragraph due to a 2003 interview with Verdens Gang where he referred to Jews as "evil murderers" and "parasites which will be cleaned out". On appeal, Tvedt was acquitted by the lagmannsrett who considered the remarks to be protected free speech, but the Supreme Court overturned the acquittal and remanded the case back to the lagmannsrett. The district court's original verdict was affirmed when the lagmannsrett reconsidered the case in May 2008.

Tvedt is divorced and has four children. On 17 November 2009, Tvedt stated to the media and declared that Vigrid should be shut down. The current leader of Vigrid, Thorgrim Bredesen, however, claimed that it is not in Tvedt's authority to make such announcements, as he is no longer the leader of the organization.

The extremist anti-US and anti-Israel newspaper Taliban Norway Magazine on 29 December. 2013 chose Tore Tvedt as "Man of the Year 2013", enunciating him as "Norway's greatest and most eloquent living dissident."
