= Ulrikke Hansen Døvigen =

Norwegian actress (born 1971)

- Born: 4 February 1971 (age 55)
- Occupation: Actress

Ulrikke Hansen Døvigen (born 4 February 1971) is a Norwegian actress. Her mother is the actress Kjersti Døvigen, and her father was the jazz musician Ole Jacob Hansen, who died when Ulrikke was 27. Educated in England, she has performed both at Det norske teatret ("Wendy Darling" in Peter Pan) and at Nationaltheatret (e.g. "Kaja Fossli" in Henrik Ibsen's The Master Builder). She has also had roles on television, like the series Hotel Cæsar, and in movies, most notably the comedy 37½. She has a daughter, born in 2004, from a relationship with the actor Mads Ousdal.
