= Åsne Seierstad =

Norwegian journalist and author (born 1970)

Åsne Guldahl Seierstad
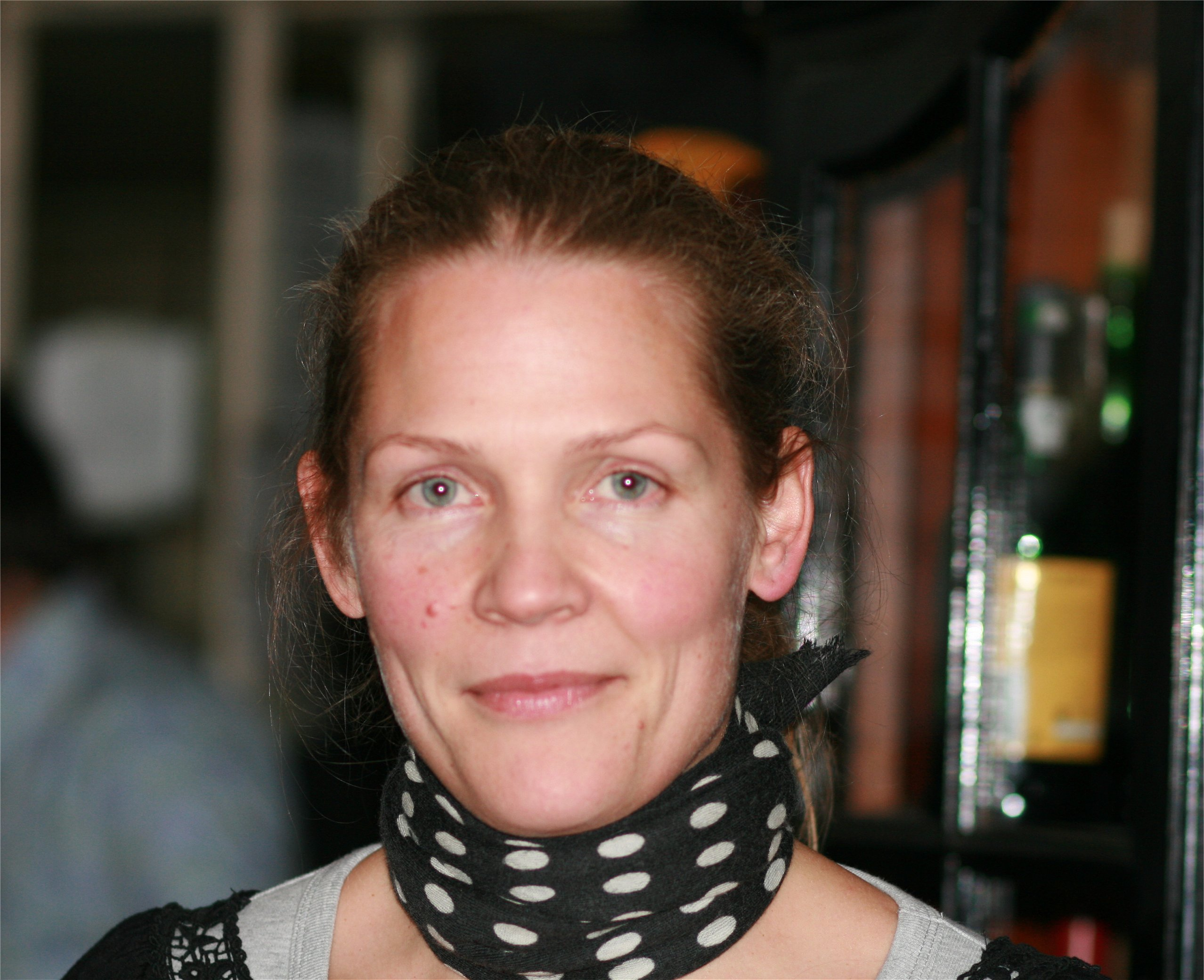
- Seierstad in 2007
- Born: 10 February 1970 (age 56); Oslo, Norway
- Occupations: Broadcast Journalist, Author
- Website: morgenbladet.no/forfatter/asne_seierstad

Åsne Seierstad (born 10 February 1970) is a Norwegian freelance journalist and writer, best known for her accounts of everyday life in war zones – most notably Kabul after 2001, Baghdad in 2002 and the ruined Grozny in 2006.

== Personal and professional life ==
Seierstad was born in Oslo, but grew up in Lillehammer, Norway, to "a feminist author mother", Lector Frøydis Guldahl, and "a leftist politician father", Assistant Professor Dag Seierstad (b. 1936) She holds a bachelor's degree from the University of Oslo where she majored in Russian, Spanish and history of ideas.

From 1993 until 1996, she reported for the Arbeiderbladet in Russia and in 1997 from China. From 1998 until 2000, she worked for the national public broadcaster NRK where she reported from the Serbian breakaway province of Kosovo. With Their Backs to The World: Portraits of Serbia, her first book, is an account of this time. (This book was extended and republished in 2004 when she again visited Serbia. The name was changed slightly, to Portraits of Serbia, indicating that Serbia's back was no longer turned to the world.)

As a reporter, she is particularly known for her work in war zones such as Afghanistan, Iraq and most recently Chechnya, as well as for her reports on the September 11 attacks in the United States. The Bookseller of Kabul, her second, bestselling book, is an account of the time she spent living with an Afghan family in Kabul after the fall of the Taliban in 2001. Her other books include One Hundred And One Days: A Baghdad Journal which describes the three months she spent in Iraq in the build-up to the U.S.-led invasion in 2003; Angel of Grozny: Inside Chechnya, an account of the time she spent in Chechnya after the war; Two Sisters: A Father, His Daughters and Their Journey Into the Syrian Jihad, which is about Ugbad and Rahma Sadiq, two teenage Somali-Norwegian sisters who joined the Islamic State (the book calls them by the alias names Ayan and Laila Juma); and One of Us: The Story of Anders Breivik and the Massacre in Norway (2015), which is the basis for the Netflix drama, 22 July.

Seierstad is fluent in five languages, and has "a good working knowledge" of another four. She currently [when?] lives and works in Oslo.

She has two children with the Norwegian jazz musician and composer Trygve Seim (b. 1971).

== Trial ==
There are contradictory accounts concerning Seierstad's legal battles with Shah Muhammad Rais, the bookseller portrayed in The Bookseller of Kabul.

According to The Irish Times, on 24 July 2010 a court in Oslo found Seierstad guilty of defamation and "negligent journalistic practices and ordered to pay damages to Suraia Rais, wife of Shah Muhammad Rais".

British newspaper The Guardian published the same story, but later revised it online and in print. The revised version claimed Seirstad was not found guilty of defamation or of negligence, but rather of invasion of privacy, the decision on damages would be taken later, and was finally 250,000 Norwegian kroner (£26,000). In relation to the book's influence on Rais's family members, The Guardian wrote "The article also said the book's revelations of personal details caused several members of the Afghan family to move to Pakistan and Canada. We should have made clear this was an allegation made by the plaintiff's side in a case document."

Seierstad won her appeal of the judgment and the Supreme Court declined to review the appellate court's decision.

== Awards and honours ==
- 1999: Gullruten Award for the best news coverage from Kosovo.
- 2001: Fritt Ord Honorary Award
- 2002: Årets Frilanser Award from the Norwegian reporters association. Also received the Norwegian Booksellers' Prize.
- 2003: Nominated for the 2003 Kurt Schork Award in International Journalism
- 2003: The Peer Gynt and Den Store Journalistprisen which is the highest honour a reporter in Norway can receive.
- 2004: The Bookseller of Kabul was shortlisted for the first Richard & Judy Best Read of the Year Award 2004.
- 2004: Winner of EMMA (Ethnic Multicultural Media award), London, May 2004
- 2004: Prix de Libraires, France
- 2018: Leipzig Book Award for European Understanding

== Published works ==
- With Their Backs to The World: Portraits of Serbia (2000, updated extensively in 2004)
- The Bookseller of Kabul (2002, English translation 2003)
- One Hundred And One Days: A Baghdad Journal (2005)
- Angel of Grozny: Inside Chechnya (2007)
- One of Us. The Story of Anders Breivik and the Massacre in Norway (2015)
- Two Sisters: A Father, His Daughters, and Their Journey into the Syrian Jihad (2018)
- Afghanerne (2022)
- The Afghans: Three Lives Through War, Love and Revolt

== Sources ==
- "Åsne Seierstad – Norsk biografisk leksikon". Norsk biografisk leksikon (in Norwegian). 30 June 2022.
