= Oslo District Court =

First-instance law court in Oslo, Norway

- Oslo tingrett (formerly: Oslo byrett)
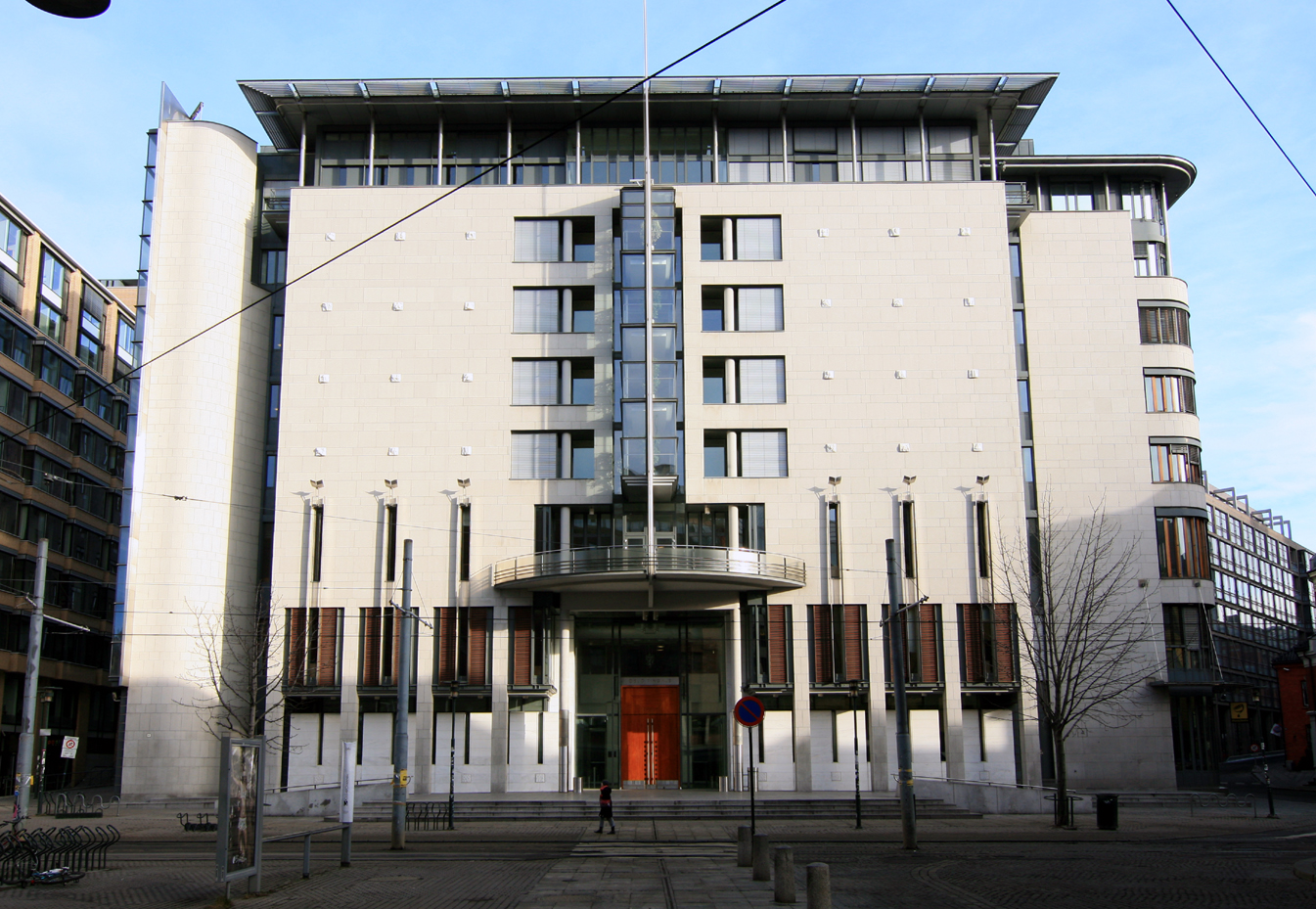
- Oslo District Court is located in Oslo Courthouse
- 59°54′56″N 10°44′29″E
- Established: 1 Jan 1867
- Jurisdiction: Oslo
- Location: Oslo, Norway
- Coordinates: 59°54′56″N 10°44′29″E
- Appeals to: Borgarting Court of Appeal
- Website: Official website

Oslo District Court (Norwegian: Oslo tingrett) is a district court located in Oslo, Norway. This court is based at the Oslo Courthouse in the city of Oslo. The court serves the entire city of Oslo and the court is subordinate to the Borgarting Court of Appeal. As the largest district court in Norway, it handles about 20% of all cases in the country. The court handled 3,000 criminal and 2,200 civil cases, as well as 7,200 summary proceedings in 2007.

It is led by a chief justice (sorenskriver), and has 100 appointed professional and deputy judges. These are divided into eight sections. In addition, the court has 105 administrative employees, of which 30 are in central administration, 59 in judicial-related jobs and 16 in security. These are led by a managing director. The court is a court of first instance. Its judicial duties are mainly to settle criminal cases and to resolve civil litigation as well as bankruptcy. The administration and registration tasks of the court include death registration, issuing certain certificates, performing duties of a notary public, and officiating civil wedding ceremonies. Cases from this court are heard by a combination of professional judges and lay judges.

Oslo is the most frequent user of interpreters of all the courts in the country, accounting for about half the use of interpreters. The most frequent languages are Arabic, English, Somali and Polish. In 2007, 23% of all cases used interpreters. The court also has a witness support program in cooperation with Oslo Red Cross.

Starting in 1999, the court initiated a court conciliation program to encourage negotiations in civil cases. This allows the parties to find a middle ground they are both satisfied with, without creating winners and losers. At the same time, time and costs are reduced. In 2007, 18% of civil cases participated in the program, and of these 74% settled through the program.

== History ==
This court was established on 1 January 1867 as the "Christiania byrett" (Christiania City Court). It was the first city court in the nation. When it was established, the old police court, fire court, and prison court for Christiania were abolished and merged into this new court, but the Christiania Bailiff's court remained in operation. The town bailiff was a judge that was appointed for certain towns to oversee certain matters. The district court covered all civil and criminal cases that were not covered by the town bailiff's court. The bailiff's court had jurisdiction over probate, bankruptcy, notary public, missing persons, some taxes, marriage, families, and other topics. In 1925, the city name was changed to Oslo, so both court names were adjusted accordingly. On 1 January 2002, the name was changed from Oslo City Court (Norwegian: Oslo byrett) to Oslo District Court (Norwegian: Oslo tingrett) as part of a national change in court names. On 26 April 2021, the sheriff's court (the last remaining of its kind in Norway) was merged with the Oslo district court, so that there was now only one court of first instance for the city/county of Oslo.

== Courthouse ==
The court is located in Oslo Courthouse, located in the city center. The building opened in 1994, and also houses the urban district court judge. The Borgarting Court of Appeal shared the building from 1994 to 2005 when moved to its own courthouse.
