= Deaths in June 2025 =

The following is a list of notable deaths in June 2025.

Entries for each day are listed alphabetically by surname. A typical entry lists information in the following sequence:

- Name, age, country of citizenship at birth, subsequent country of citizenship (if applicable), reason for notability, cause of death (if known), and reference.

== June 2025 ==
=== 1 ===
- Esko Ahonen, 69, Finnish politician, MP (2003–2011).
- Carl R. Ajello, 92, American politician, attorney general of Connecticut (1975–1983).
- Aharon Amram, 86, Yemeni-born Israeli singer, composer and poet.
- Edward Anders, 98, Latvian-born American chemist.
- Robert Anderson, 76, New Zealand cricketer (Otago, Central Districts, national team).
- Ali Saeed Badwan, 65, Palestinian writer.
- Paul Brincat, Australian sound engineer (The Thin Red Line, Star Wars, Superman Returns), brain tumour.
- Charlie Brumfield, 76, American athlete and attorney, cancer.
- Roland Curram, 92, English actor (Eldorado, Darling, Terry and June) and author, kidney failure and prostate cancer.
- Raymond Destin, 79, Martinican footballer (RC Rivière-Pilote, national team).
- Fred Espenak, 71, American astrophysicist, idiopathic pulmonary fibrosis.
- John R. Gorman, 99, American Roman Catholic prelate, auxiliary bishop of Chicago (1988–2003).
- Gordon R. Hall, 98, American jurist, justice of the Utah Supreme Court (1977–1993).
- Andy Johnson, 72, American politician, member of the Florida House of Representatives (1979–1982), complications from progressive supranuclear palsy.
- Jonathan Joss, 59, American actor (King of the Hill, Parks and Recreation, The Magnificent Seven), shot.
- Monica Nielsen, 87, Swedish actress (Varuhuset, The Princess, The Girl in the Rain).
- Víctor Manuel Ochoa Cadavid, 62, Colombian Roman Catholic prelate, military ordinariate (since 2020) and bishop of Cúcuta (2015–2020).
- Carmen Pola, 86, Puerto Rican politician and community activist.
- Gerry Redmond, 82, English rugby union player (Cambridge University, England).
- Ayşe Seitmuratova, 88, Uzbek Crimean Tatar civil rights activist.
- Zain Serudin, 88, Bruneian poet and politician, minister of religious affairs (1986–2010).
- Heidemarie Unterreiner, 81, Austrian politician, MP (2008–2013).
- E.H. Warkentin, 92, American politician.
- Steve Wright, 82, American football player (Green Bay Packers, New York Giants, Washington Redskins).

=== 2 ===
- Bahram Akasheh, 89, Iranian geophysicist and seismologist.
- Hans Bachmann, 70, American actor (Beyond the Rising Moon, Invader, Broadcast News).
- Erroll Bennett, 75, Tahitian footballer (A.S. Central Sport, Paris Saint-Germain, Tahiti national team).
- Brian Bond, 89, British military historian.
- Eva Borušovičová, 55, Slovak screenwriter (Janosik: A True Story), eye cancer.
- Birgit Carlstén, 75, Swedish singer and actress (The Sacrifice).
- Elemér Csák, 81, Hungarian journalist and politician, spokesperson of the government (1995).
- Nicole David, 51, Saint Lucian soca musician, cancer.
- E. Brian Davies, 80, British mathematician and academic.
- Margaret A. Dix, 86, British-born Guatemalan botanist.
- Richard R. Eakin, 86, American academic administrator, chancellor of East Carolina University (1987–2001).
- Mohammed Hamoud Al-Fajji, 85, Kuwaiti politician, MP (2003–2006).
- Roger Freeman, Baron Freeman, 83, British politician, chancellor of the Duchy of Lancaster (1995–1997), MP (1983–1997).
- Isidoro Galán, 89, Spanish Roman Catholic priest and trade unionist.
- Lê Văn Tiết, 85, Vietnamese table tennis player.
- Henry Leppä, 78, Finnish ice hockey player (Jokerit, TUTO, national team).
- David McGillivray, 75, Canadian Olympic figure skater (1968).
- Lenore Miller, 93, American labor union leader, president of the Retail, Wholesale and Department Store Union (1986–1998) and the Jewish Labor Committee (1989–1998).
- Gustáv Mráz, 90, Slovak footballer (Inter Bratislava, Czechoslovakia national team).
- Abdelhak Mrini, 91, Moroccan historian, civil servant and royal advisor.
- Pierre Nora, 93, French historian, member of the Académie Française.
- José Luis Olaizola, 97, Spanish lawyer and writer.
- Marek Oleksiński, 84, Polish politician, voivode of Nowy Sącz (1996–1997).
- Giuseppe Parlato, 73, Italian historian.
- Jean-Pierre Pernot, 77, French politician, deputy (1999–2002), mayor of Méry-sur-Oise (1995–2014).
- Morris Talansky, 92, American businessman and rabbi.
- Tan Joe Hok, 87, Indonesian badminton player.
- José Antonio Tejedor, 81, Spanish footballer (Real Valladolid, Real Zaragoza, Deportivo de La Coruña).
- Tineta, 52, Canadian country singer.
- Xu Qiliang, 75, Chinese military officer, vice chairman of the Central Military Commission (2012–2023) and commander of the PLA Air Force (2007–2012).
- Sana Yousaf, 17, Pakistani social media influencer, shot.

=== 3 ===
- Kgotla Autlwetse, 76, Motswana politician, MP (2014–2019).
- Samiha Ayoub, 93, Egyptian actress (Among the Ruins).
- Gary Boyd, 78, American baseball player (Cleveland Indians).
- Cristian Brenna, 54, Italian rock climber and mountaineer, fall.
- Joška Broz, 77, Serbian politician, MP (2016–2022).
- Eugen Doga, 88, Moldovan composer.
- Doug Eggers, 94, American football player (Baltimore Colts, Chicago Cardinals).
- Acsinte Gaspar, 87, Romanian judge and politician, deputy (1996–2004), member of the constitutional court (2004–2013).
- Pietro Ghislandi, 68, Italian actor (È arrivato mio fratello, The Invisible Wall, Vajont) and ventriloquist.
- Gidon Graetz, 95, Swiss-Israeli sculptor.
- Halvor Haug, 73, Norwegian composer.
- Frankie Jordan, 86, French rock and roll singer, cancer.
- Piet Kamerman, 99, Dutch actor (De Stille Kracht, Baantjer, Character).
- Lin Cheng-chieh, 72, Taiwanese politician, MP (1990–1996).
- Jim Marshall, 87, American football player (Minnesota Vikings, Saskatchewan Roughriders, Cleveland Browns).
- Jacqueline Means, 89–90, American Anglican priest. (death announced on this date)
- Shigeo Nagashima, 89, Japanese baseball player and manager (Yomiuri Giants), pneumonia.
- Obisia Nwankpa, 75, Nigerian Olympic boxer (1972).
- Osvaldinho, 79, Portuguese footballer (Vitória S.C., Marítimo, national team).
- Valery Panov, 87, Soviet-born Israeli ballet dancer and choreographer.
- Juliette Powell, 54, American-Canadian media expert, acute bacterial meningitis.
- Veda Louise Reed, 91, American artist.
- Frank L. Ridley, 66, American actor (Don't Look Up, Inside Llewyn Davis, Brotherhood).
- San Kim Sean, 80, Cambodian bokator practitioner, heart attack.
- Jens Peter Vernersen, 78, Danish politician, MP (1994–2011).
- Edmund White, 85, American writer (Nocturnes for the King of Naples, A Boy's Own Story, The Beautiful Room Is Empty), gastroenteritis.
- Jay Wynne, 56, British weather presenter (BBC Weather).
- Hugo Zapata, 79, Colombian architect.

=== 4 ===
- Sukur Ali Ahmed, 66, Indian politician, Assam MLA (1996–2006, 2011–2021).
- Richard Alba, 82, American sociologist.
- Frans van Bronckhorst, 76, Indonesian Olympic boxer (1976).
- William Cran, 79, Australian-born English-Canadian documentary filmmaker.
- Nicole Croisille, 88, French singer and actress (Erotissimo, Les Uns et les Autres, There Were Days... and Moons).
- Rachel Crotto, 66, American chess player.
- Oste Erceg, 78, Bosnian painter.
- Bernd Fischer, 86, German football manager (Wormatia Worms, Indonesia national team).
- Eduardo Gageiro, 90, Portuguese photographer.
- Marc Garneau, 76, Canadian politician and astronaut, MP (2008–2023), minister of transport (2015–2021) and foreign affairs (2021), lymphoma and leukemia.
- Karlmann Geiß, 90, German jurist and judge, president of the Federal Court of Justice (1996–2000).
- Niède Guidon, 92, Brazilian archaeologist.
- Fred Hucul, 93, Canadian ice hockey player (Chicago Blackhawks, St. Louis Blues).
- Clifton Jones, 87, Jamaican-British actor (Space: 1999, Watership Down, China Moon).
- Philippe Labro, 88, French film director (Without Apparent Motive, The Inheritor, The Hunter Will Get You), writer, and journalist, cancer.
- Jane Larkworthy, 62, American beauty editor and journalist (The Cut, Air Mail), breast cancer.
- Daniel Lelong, 92, French gallerist and publisher.
- Mark Lomas, 76, American football player (New York Jets).
- Rashid Lombard, 74, South African jazz photographer, cofounder of the Cape Town International Jazz Festival.
- Hassouna Mosbahi, 75, Tunisian author (A Tunisian Tale) and literary critic.
- Edwin Perry, 76–77, New Zealand politician, MP (2002–2005).
- Clark Platon, 94, Brazilian engineer and politician, deputy (1983–1987).
- Jean Robinson, 95, British health activist.
- Rodolfo Saglimbeni, 62, Venezuelan orchestral conductor.
- Tatiana Sakharova, 51, Russian politician, senator (since 2021).
- Giancarlo Santalmassi, 83, Italian journalist (RAI, Radio 24).
- Neven Šimac, 81, Croatian lawyer and translator.
- Enzo Staiola, 85, Italian child actor (Bicycle Thieves, The Barefoot Contessa, I'll Get You for This), fall.
- Piero Testoni, 73, Italian politician, deputy (2001–2013).
- Raymond Warren, 96, British composer.

=== 5 ===
- Hoda Al-Ajimi, 88, Egyptian broadcaster.
- Djoher Amhis-Ouksel, 96–97, Algerian writer.
- Jibril Aminu, 85, Nigerian politician, senator (2003–2011).
- Bob Andrews, 75, English keyboardist (Brinsley Schwarz, The Rumour) and record producer.
- Bill Atkinson, 74, American computer engineer and programmer, pancreatic cancer.
- Walter Brueggemann, 92, American theologian and Old Testament scholar.
- Hubert Buchberger, 73, German violinist, conductor, and music teacher.
- Kenneth Buzbee, 87, American politician, member of the Illinois Senate (1973–1985).
- Dennis Dauttmam, 62, Brazilian politician, mayor of Belford Roxo (2012–2016), pneumonia.
- Diana Domingues, 77–78, Brazilian artist and art historian.
- Mike Eghan, 89, Ghanaian broadcaster.
- Michel Enock, 78, French mathematician.
- Eddie Garcia, 65, American football player (SMU, Green Bay Packers).
- Anatoly Gunitsky, 71, Russian writer, journalist, and musician (Aquarium), cancer.
- Rich Hulkow, 75, American football coach, complications from Parkinson's disease.
- Norman Hutchins, 62, American gospel musician.
- Eddie Loyden, 79, English footballer (Barnsley, Chester City, Tranmere Rovers).
- Edgar Lungu, 68, Zambian politician, president (2015–2021), minister of defence (2013–2015) and MLA (2011–2015), complications from surgery.
- Albert de Pury, 84, Swiss biblical scholar, historian, and exegete.
- Tom Rafferty, 70, American football player (Dallas Cowboys), Super Bowl champion (1978), stroke.
- Peter Rice, 87, Australian footballer (Camberwell, South Melbourne, Richmond).
- Michel Schifres, 79, French journalist, managing editor of Le Figaro (1998–2000).
- John Shulock, 76, American baseball umpire.
- Pierre Toubert, 92, French historian and academic.

=== 6 ===
- Abbas Khan Afridi, 54, Pakistani politician and businessman, senator (2009–2018), injuries from a gas explosion.
- Peter Banner, 76, English rugby league player (Salford, Featherstone Rovers, Wales national team).
- Changuito, 76, Cuban percussionist.
- Joyce Chitsulo, 47, Malawian politician.
- Jaraan Cornell, 48, American basketball player (Purdue Boilermakers, Gary Steelheads).
- Mike Ejeagha, 95, Nigerian musician.
- Burgl Färbinger, 79, German Olympic alpine skier (1964, 1968).
- Renee Ferguson, 75, American journalist (WBBM-TV, WMAQ-TV).
- Ralph Fonseca, 75, Belizean politician, MP (1993–2008) and minister of finance (2003–2004).
- Graham Gund, 84, American architect (Lowry Center) and art collector.
- William C. Harrop, 96, American diplomat, inspector general of the Department of State (1983–1986), ambassador to Israel (1992–1993) and Zaire (1988–1991).
- Hattori Yūji, 64, Japanese sumo wrestler, liver cancer.
- Ghazwa Al-Khalidi, 81, Iraqi actress.
- Azim Latipov, 74, Uzbek politician, senator (2004–2019).
- Art Madrid, 90, American politician, mayor of La Mesa, California (1990–2014).
- Alan G. Marshall, 81, American analytical chemist.
- Enrique Marzal, 84, Spanish dressmaker and costume designer.
- Mamerto Menapace, 83, Argentine Roman Catholic monk and writer.
- Scott Metcalfe, 58, Canadian ice hockey player (Edmonton Oilers, Buffalo Sabres, Rochester Americans).
- Ibrahima N'Diaye, 77, Malian politician, mayor of Bamako (1998–2003).
- Virgil Nemoianu, 85, Romanian essayist and philosopher.
- Vasilis Papavasileiou, 76, Greek theatre director and actor.
- Ray Peckham, 95, Australian Aboriginal activist.
- Thennala Balakrishna Pillai, 95, Indian politician, MP (1991–1998, 2003–2009) and twice Kerala MLA.
- Claude Poissant, 69, Canadian theatre director, actor (The Party), and screenwriter (Nelligan).
- Dick Poole, 94, Australian rugby league player and coach (Newtown, Western Suburbs, national team).
- Raidi, 86, Chinese Tibetan politician, vice chairman of SCNPC (2003–2008), chairman of the TARPC (1993–2003) and the TARC of the CPPCC (1985–1993).
- Frans Said, 92, Maltese broadcaster and writer.
- Don Samuelson, 92, American politician, member of the Minnesota House of Representatives (1969–1983) and Minnesota Senate (1983–2003).
- Benny Schmidt, 95, Danish Olympic modern pentathlete (1960).
- Ion Sideri, 87–88, Romanian Olympic sprint canoer (1960). (death announced on this date)
- Naomi Stadlen, 82, British therapist and writer.
- Mohammed Uwais, 88, Nigerian jurist, chief justice (1995–2006).
- Marise Wipani, 61, New Zealand beauty pageant contestant, actress (Came a Hot Friday, Shortland Street), and television presenter (Lotto).
- Muhammad Yahya Waloni, 54, Indonesian Islamic scholar.
- Marlène Zarader, 75, French philosopher and academic.

=== 7 ===
- As'ad Abu Shari'a, 48, Palestinian military officer, leader of the Palestinian Mujahideen Movement (since 2007), airstrike.
- James Cook, 66, Jamaican-born British boxer, European super-middleweight champion (1991–1992), bladder cancer.
- Albert H. Crews, 96, American engineer and astronaut.
- Sir William Davis, 70, English jurist, justice of the High Court (2014–2021) and lord justice of appeal (since 2021), respiratory failure.
- Julia Dingwort-Nusseck, 103, German journalist.
- Francis Giacobetti, 85, French photographer and film director (Emmanuelle 2).
- Luis Jalandoni, 90, Filipino-Dutch priest and rebel, co-founder of the NDFP and Christians for National Liberation.
- Anthony D. Jordan, 91, English badminton player.
- René Jourdan, 82, French long-distance runner.
- Klaus König, 91, German tenor.
- Marek Košút, 36, Slovak footballer (Nitra, Šaľa, Galanta), fall.
- José Luis Mollaghan, 79, Argentine Roman Catholic prelate, bishop of San Miguel (2000–2005) and archbishop of Rosario (2006–2014).
- Mom Chim Huy, 89, Cambodian politician.
- Milka Podrug-Kokotović, 94, Croatian actress (Snowstorm, Occupation in 26 Pictures, A Summer to Remember).
- Uriah Rennie, 65, English football referee.
- Beuford Smith, 89, American photographer.
- Vladimír Smutný, 82, Czech cinematographer (Forbidden Dreams, Kolya, The Painted Bird).
- Edward Szymański, 88, Polish politician, MP (1976–1989), acting chief of the chancellery of the president (1997, 2005).
- Denis Waitley, 92, American motivational speaker.

=== 8 ===
- Saverio Asprea, 92, Italian politician, president of the province of Modena (1975–1980).
- Eneko Belausteguigoitia, 91, Mexican businessman, cultural patron and promoter.
- Eric Bhat, 68, French journalist.
- Lawrence Eugene Brandt, 86, American Roman Catholic prelate, bishop of Greensburg (2004–2015), cardiac arrest.
- Steve Burrage, 72, American politician, Oklahoma state auditor and inspector (2008–2011).
- Ewa Dałkowska, 78, Polish actress (Nights and Days, Without Anesthesia, A Year of the Quiet Sun).
- Matija Dedić, 52, Croatian jazz pianist and composer.
- Wayne DeSutter, 81, American football player (Buffalo Bills).
- Douglas Patrick George, 81, Canadian visual artist.
- Maganti Gopinath, 62, Indian politician, Telangana MLA (since 2014), heart attack.
- Vladyslav Gorai, 59–60, Ukrainian operatic tenor (Odesa Opera and Ballet Theatre).
- David Greenwood, 68, American basketball player (Chicago Bulls, San Antonio Spurs, Detroit Pistons), cancer.
- George Gush, 89, British historian.
- Ariel Kalma, 78, French new-age composer and electronic musician.
- Hamilton R. Krans Jr., 81, American politician, member of the New Hampshire House of Representatives (2016–2018).
- Nina Kuscsik, 86, American long-distance runner, Boston Marathon winner (1972), complications from Alzheimer's disease.
- Charles Miller, 85, American politician, member of the Kentucky House of Representatives (1998–2023).
- Antioco Piseddu, 88, Italian Roman Catholic prelate, bishop of Lanusei (1981–2014).
- Gilbert Ramano, 85, South African military officer, chief of the Army (1998–2004).
- Anthony Reid, 85, New Zealand-born Australian historian and academic.
- Sir John Sainty, 90, British parliamentary official, clerk of the Parliaments (1983–1990).
- Claus P. Schnorr, 81, German mathematician and cryptographer.
- Hazel Simmons-McDonald, 78, St. Lucian writer and linguist.
- P. Adams Sitney, 80, American film historian, cancer.
- Carlo von Tiedemann, 81, German television presenter.
- Stu Wilson, 70, New Zealand rugby union player (Wellington, national team).
- Cheo Zorrilla, 75, Dominican composer, trumpet player, and singer.

=== 9 ===
- Akbar Ahmadpour, 66, Iranian politician, MP (2020–2024).
- Bill Bagley, 96, American politician, member of the California State Assembly (1961–1974).
- Victor-Lévy Beaulieu, 79, Canadian writer, playwright, and editor.
- Constance Cumbey, 81, American lawyer and Christian activist.
- Pierre Dubois, 86, Swiss politician, member of the Grand Council of Neuchâtel (1973–1980), Neuchâtel councillor of state (1980–1997).
- Peter Easterby, 95, British racehorse trainer.
- Frederick Forsyth, 86, English novelist (The Day of the Jackal, The Odessa File, The Fourth Protocol).
- Partho Ghosh, 76, Indian film director (100 Days, Dalaal, Agni Sakshi).
- Vivienne Gray, 77, New Zealand academic.
- S. Gunasekaran, 58, Indian politician, Tamil Nadu MLA (2016–2021).
- Barbara Holdridge, 95, American recording executive, founder of Caedmon Records.
- Tibor Kincses, 65, Hungarian judoka, Olympic bronze medallist (1980).
- Hertha Kluge-Pott, 90, German-Australian printmaker.
- Peter Krykant, 48, Scottish drugs campaigner.
- Panikos Krystallis, 86, Cypriot footballer (AEL Limassol, AEK Athens, national team).
- Pik-Sen Lim, 80, Malaysian-British actress (Emergency Ward 10, Mind Your Language, Johnny English Reborn).
- Arthur Cunha Lima, 75, Brazilian politician, Paraíba MLA (1999–2010), multiple organ failure.
- David H. Murdock, 102, American food industry executive, owner of Castle & Cooke (since 1985) and Dole Food Company (since 2003).
- Lucien Nedzi, 100, American politician, member of the U.S. House of Representatives (1961–1981).
- Kimiko Nishimoto, 97, Brazilian-born Japanese Internet celebrity and photographer.
- Noh Tae-geuk, 87, South Korean politician, MP (1981–1985).
- Viktor Pimushin, 70, Russian footballer (Spartak Kostroma, Fakel Voronezh, Kuzbass Kemerovo).
- Julio Quevedo, 85, Guatemalan Olympic runner (1968, 1972).
- Chris Robinson, 86, American actor (General Hospital, 12 O'Clock High, The Bold and the Beautiful).
- Marcel Sabou, 59, Romanian footballer (Dinamo București, CD Tenerife, Racing Santander), complications from amyotrophic lateral sclerosis.
- Ulrica Schenström, 52, Swedish politician.
- Axel Skalstad, 32, Norwegian jazz drummer.
- Sly Stone, 82, American Hall of Fame musician (Sly and the Family Stone) and songwriter ("Everyday People", "Family Affair"), chronic obstructive pulmonary disease.
- John Tautolo, 66, American football player (New York Giants, Los Angeles Raiders).
- Wang Hsing-ching, 79, Taiwanese journalist.
- James Watt, 81, American politician, member of the Florida House of Representatives (1978–1986).
- Katerina Yioulaki, 87, Greek actress (The Dodger, Oi kyries tis avlis, Gia mia choufta Touristries).
- Ferdi Zeyrek, 48, Turkish politician, mayor of Manisa metropolitan municipality (since 2024), injuries sustained from electrocution.

=== 10 ===
- Bujar Bukoshi, 78, Kosovar politician, prime minister (1991–2000), cancer.
- Terry Callan, 86, Australian footballer (Geelong).
- Travis Carter, 75, American racing crew chief (NASCAR) and team owner (Travis Carter Enterprises).
- Irma Clark-Coleman, 88, American politician, member of the Michigan House of Representatives (1999–2002), Michigan Senate (2003–2010) and Wayne County Commission (since 2011).
- Robert Cordner, 93, Canadian Olympic sprint canoer (1952).
- Len Doyal, 80, American-British medical ethicist (Informed Consent in Medical Research) and academic.
- Slaviša Đurković, 56, Montenegrin footballer (Sutjeska Nikšić, Leotar).
- Gary England, 85, American meteorologist (KWTV), creator of the First Warning system.
- Terry Louise Fisher, 79, American television writer and producer (L.A. Law, Cagney & Lacey, 2000 Malibu Road).
- Leanne Frahm, 79, Australian writer.
- Karin Graßhof, 87, German judge, justice of the Federal Constitutional Court (1986–1998).
- Günter Harder, 87, German mathematician.
- Elaine L. Jack, 97, Canadian-American author and LDS Church leader, president of the Relief Society (1990–1997).
- David Kelly, 84, American mathematics professor.
- Suchinda Kraprayoon, 91, Thai politician and army general, prime minister (1992), supreme commander of defence forces (1991–1992) and leader of the 1991 coup d'état.
- Paschal Long, 75, Irish hurling referee.
- Vasile Mănăilă, 62, Romanian football player (Universitatea Craiova, Farul Constanța, national team) and coach.
- Jonathan Mayers, 51, American music promoter, co-founder of Bonnaroo and Outside Lands, heart attack.
- Bill McKinney, 88, English footballer (Newcastle United, Bournemouth, Mansfield Town). (death announced on this date)
- Don Moore, 86, American jazz double-bassist.
- Roka Ngarimu-Cameron, 76, New Zealand master weaver.
- Lyndell Petersen, 93, American politician, member of the South Dakota Senate (1977–1994).
- José Enrique Serrano Martínez, 75, Spanish politician, director of the cabinet of the prime minister (1995–1996, 2004–2011).
- Doug Skaff, 48, American politician, member of the West Virginia House of Delegates (2008–2014, 2018–2023), traffic collision.
- Paul Thomas, 76, American pornographic actor (Candy Stripers, Pretty Peaches, Dracula Sucks) and director.
- Jenny de la Torre Castro, 71, Peruvian-German physician.
- Marek Trojanowicz, 81, Polish chemist and academic.
- Günther Uecker, 95, German painter, sculptor, and installation artist.
- Daisy Wende, 95, Bolivian fashion designer.
- Phyllis Yampolsky, 92, American artist.
- Harris Yulin, 87, American actor (Scarface, Clear and Present Danger, Ozark), cardiac arrest.

=== 11 ===
- Magnus Aarbakke, 90, Norwegian judge, justice of the Supreme Court (1994–2002) and member of the Norwegian Academy of Science and Letters.
- Olaf Almenningen, 78, Norwegian linguist.
- Doris Ansari, 84, British politician.
- Stew Barber, 85, American football player (Buffalo Bills).
- Leka Bungo, 81, Albanian film director and actor.
- Stella Chen, 75, Taiwanese politician, MP (1993–1995), breast cancer.
- Jon Eikemo, 85, Norwegian actor (Orion's Belt).
- Liam Fitzgerald, 75, Irish politician, senator (1997–2007) and TD (1981–1982, 1982–1997).
- Manuel Fuentes, 84, Chilean rodeo rider.
- Icko Iben, 93, American astronomer and academic.
- Aliosman Imamov, 72, Bulgarian politician, MP (2001–2017).
- Jeltien Kraaijeveld-Wouters, 92, Dutch politician, state secretary for culture, recreation and social work (1977–1981) and MP (1973–1977, 1981–1988).
- Alexander Kuo, 86, American writer and poet.
- Ananda Lewis, 52, American television personality (MTV, While You Were Out), breast cancer.
- Marc'O, 98, French writer, researcher, and filmmaker.
- Douglas McCarthy, 58, English musician (Nitzer Ebb).
- Robert A. Nakamura, 88, American filmmaker.
- Ronald Napier, 89, South African cricketer (Oxford University), lawyer and company director.
- Einar Olsen, 89, Norwegian newspaper editor (Rogalands Avis, Vestfold Arbeiderblad, Norwegian News Agency).
- Dana Puchnarová, 87, Czech painter, illustrator, and graphic artist.
- John Robbins, 77, American author (Diet for a New America), complications from post-polio syndrome.
- Ayumu Saito, 60, Japanese actor (Ju-On: The Grudge 2, The Angel's Egg, Journey Under the Midnight Sun), urothelial carcinoma.
- Bernard Samson, 66, French footballer (Rennes, Abbeville, Guingamp).
- Rafael Samudio, 93, Colombian military officer (Palace of Justice siege), minister of national defense (1986–1988).
- Tetsuo Satō, 76, Japanese volleyball player, Olympic champion (1972).
- Paul Shooner, 102, Canadian politician, Quebec MNA (1966–1970).
- Knut Solem, 78, Norwegian diplomat.
- Igor Uchytel, 70, Ukrainian academician, engineer, and businessman.
- Sally Roesch Wagner, 82, American author.
- Brian Wilson, 82, American Hall of Fame musician (The Beach Boys), songwriter ("Good Vibrations"), and record producer (Pet Sounds), respiratory arrest.
- Gazi Yaşargil, 99, Turkish neurosurgeon.

=== 12 ===
- Rosita Alonso, 82, Argentine-Colombian actress.
- David Bindman, 84, English academic. (death announced on this date)
- Else Breen, 98, Norwegian children's author.
- Bernard Cassen, 87, French journalist (Le Monde diplomatique).
- Florea Dudiță, 91, Romanian politician, senator (1992–1993).
- Patience Eboumbou, Cameroonian telecommunications engineer and politician, senator (2018–2023).
- June M. Eisland, 85, American politician, member of the New York City Council (1979–2001).
- Nolen Ellison, 83, American basketball player (Kansas Jayhawks).
- Thomas Etienne, 94, Dominican politician, Deputy Premier (1974–1975).
- Kent Frates, 86, American politician, member of the Oklahoma House of Representatives (1971–1979).
- Shiho Fujimura, 86, Japanese actress (Shinobi no Mono, Destiny's Son, The Snow Woman).
- Charlie Gaddy, 93, American anchorman (WRAL-TV).
- Maurice Gee, 93, New Zealand author (Under the Mountain, In My Father's Den, Plumb), AFNZ Icon (since 2003).
- Charles Ho, 75, Hong Kong media executive, chairman of Sing Tao News Corporation (2001–2021), lung cancer.
- Zoltán Horváth, 88, Hungarian fencer, Olympic champion (1960).
- Sunjay Kapur, 53, Indian businessman, heart attack.
- Gérard La Forest, 99, Canadian jurist, justice of the Supreme Court (1985–1997).
- José Martins Jr., 86, Portuguese politician and Roman Catholic priest, member of the Madeira Legislative Assembly (1976–1992, 1996–2007).
- Sergey Mishin, 66, Russian kettlebell lifter.
- Lopön Tenzin Namdak, 98–99, Tibetan religious leader.
- John Noone, 89, British writer. (death announced on this date)
- Sir Geoff Palmer, 85, Jamaican-British academic and human rights activist.
- Vatimi Rayalu, Fijian politician, MP (since 2022).
- Vijay Rupani, 68, Indian politician, chief minister of Gujarat (2016–2021), MP (2006–2012), plane crash.
- Barbara Siciliano, 52, Italian volleyball player (national team), cardiac problems.
- Phil Silva, 84, New Zealand psychologist and paediatrician, founder and director (1972–1999) of the Dunedin Study.
- Peter Simone, 79, American organized crime figure.
- Sir Cliff Skeggs, 94, New Zealand Hall of Fame businessman and politician, mayor of Dunedin (1977–1989).
- Radu Stroe, 75, Romanian politician, minister of internal affairs (2012–2014).
- Kulsara Sulaymanova, 95, Kyrgyz politician, member of the Soviet of Nationalities (1966–1974). (death announced on this date)
- Jill Dopf Viles, 50, American writer and medical researcher.
- Nikolay Vinogradov, 78, Russian politician, governor of Vladimir Oblast (1996–2013).

=== 13 ===
- Vic Aanensen, 72, Australian footballer (Port Melbourne, South Melbourne).
- Martín Billoch, 65, Argentine Olympic sailor (1996).
- Atul Butte, 55, American medical researcher, cancer.
- Juan Carlos Carone, 83, Argentine footballer (Atlanta, Vélez Sarsfield, national team).
- Stephen Charles, 87, Australian jurist, judge of the Supreme Court of Victoria (1995–2006).
- Carin Cone, 85, American swimmer, Olympic silver medalist (1956).
- Kieran Conway, 74–75, Irish Provisional IRA member and lawyer.
- Barney Daniels, 74, English footballer (Ashton United, Stockport County, Hyde United).
- Joel DeMott, 78, American documentarian (Seventeen), chronic obstructive pulmonary disease.
- Jeannine Dion-Guérin, 92, French writer and poet.
- James Fankhauser, 85, American conductor and music educator.
- Betsy Gay, 96, American actress (The Adventures of Tom Sawyer, Our Gang Follies of 1938).
- Franzo Grande Stevens, 96, Italian lawyer.
- Raymond J. Kahoun, 88, American politician.
- Dill Katz, 79, British jazz bassist.
- Ralph Katzman, 85, Canadian politician, Saskatchewan MLA (1975–1986).
- Neil J. Miller, 95, American politician, member of the Idaho House of Representatives (1967–1970) and Senate (1971–1972).
- Louis Moholo, 85, South African jazz drummer.
- Seán Neeson, 79, Northern Irish politician, MLA (1982–1986, 1998–2011).
- Piotr Nowina-Konopka, 76, Polish politician and diplomat.
- Edd Nye, 92, American politician, member of the North Carolina Senate (1975–1977) and North Carolina House of Representatives (1977–1983, 1985–2007).
- Johnny O'Brien, 94, American baseball player (Pittsburgh Pirates, St. Louis Cardinals, Milwaukee Braves).
- Ferjan Ormeling Jr., 82, Dutch cartographer.
- Sandro Pignatti, 94, Italian botanist.
- Peggy Reeves Sanday, 87, American cultural anthropologist and academic.
- Artur Santos, 94, Portuguese footballer (Benfica, national team).
- Ulrich Schindel, 89, German classical philologist.
- Stephen Stanko, 57, American convicted murderer, execution by lethal injection.
- Václav Toužimský, 90, Czech photographer.
- Hamilton Wanasinghe, 90, Sri Lankan army general, commander of the army (1988–1991).
- Notable Iranians killed in the Twelve-Day War:
  - Fereydoon Abbasi, 66, nuclear scientist, politician, and academic administrator, MP (2022–2024), head of the AEOI (2011–2013), and president of IHU (2001–2011)
  - Mansour Asgari, 67, nuclear physicist
  - Mohammad Bagheri, 64–65, military officer, chief of the General Staff (since 2016)
  - Ali Bakouei, 50, nuclear scientist
  - Amir Hossein Feghhi, 46, nuclear engineer and academic
  - Amir Ali Hajizadeh, 63, military officer, commander of IRGCASF (since 2009)
  - Gholamreza Mehrabi, 64, brigadier general in the IRGC
  - Abdolhamid Minouchehr, 63, nuclear physicist and nuclear engineer
  - Mehdi Rabbani, military officer, deputy for operations of the General Staff of the Armed Forces of the Islamic Republic of Iran (since 2016)
  - Gholam Ali Rashid, 71–72, military officer, commander of Khatam al-Anbiya Central Headquarters (since 2016) and deputy chief of the General Staff (1999–2016)
  - Hossein Salami, 64–65, military officer, commander of the IRGC (since 2019)
  - Mohammad Mehdi Tehranchi, 60, theoretical physicist
  - Ahmadreza Zolfaghari Daryani, 65, nuclear physicist and academic

=== 14 ===
- Afa Ah Loo, 39, Samoan fashion designer (Project Runway), shot.
- Paul Alger, 81, German footballer (1. FC Köln, Viktoria Köln).
- Sabirou Bassa-Djeri, 37, Togolese footballer (Enyimba, national team).
- Guillaume Bijl, 79, Belgian sculptor, conceptual and installation artist.
- Saeed Borji, 66–67, Iranian nuclear physicist and engineer, airstrike.
- Liberato Caboclo, 87, Brazilian physician and politician, deputy (1991–1995) and mayor of São José do Rio Preto (1997–2000).
- Violeta Chamorro, 95, Nicaraguan politician, president (1990–1997), member of the Junta of National Reconstruction (1979–1980).
- Catherine Delbarre, 100, French Olympic fencer (1956, 1960).
- Trent Dolan, 87, American actor (Days of Our Lives, G.I. Blues).
- Joe Fletcher, 78, English footballer (Rochdale, Grimsby Town, Barrow).
- Cyril Hazard, 97, British astronomer.
- Melissa Hortman, 55, American politician, speaker (2019–2025) and member (since 2005) of the Minnesota House of Representatives, shot.
- Ivan Indinok, 86, Russian politician, mayor of Novosibirsk (1991–1993) and governor of Novosibirsk Oblast (1993–1995).
- Turki bin Abdulaziz al-Jasser, Saudi blogger and journalist, executed.
- Kollangudi Karuppayee, 99, Indian folk singer and actress (Aan Paavam, Gopala Gopala, Kabadi Kabadi).
- Vladimir Korotkov, 77, Russian Olympic tennis player (1968).
- Topsy Küppers, 93, German-born Austrian actress (Guitars of Love, Three Girls from the Rhine), singer, and writer.
- Ralph J. Lamberti, 90, American politician, Staten Island borough president (1984–1989), complications from Alzheimer's disease.
- Leonard Lauder, 92, American cosmetics industry executive, CEO of The Estée Lauder Companies (1982–1999).
- Cocoy Laurel, 71, Filipino singer and actor (Miss Saigon), multiple organ failure.
- Fernando Lázaro Fernández, 59, Spanish investigative journalist (El Mundo), MALT lymphoma.
- Steven Leckie, 67, Canadian singer (The Viletones), lung cancer.
- Teresa Rita Lopes, 87, Portuguese writer.
- Penelope Mountjoy, 78, British archaeologist.
- Giuseppe Nuara, 88, Italian politician, president of province of Modena (1980–1985).
- Henk van Os, 87, Dutch art historian.
- Scylla Duarte Prata, 101, Brazilian gynecologist and oncology hospital founder.
- Hussein Al-Qattan, 88, Kuwaiti actor.
- Joel Shapiro, 83, American sculptor (Untitled, Loss and Regeneration), acute myeloid leukemia.
- Harold Tanner, 93, American investment banker.
- Malcolm Yapp, 94, British historian.

=== 15 ===
- Juan Manuel Abal Medina, 80, Argentine journalist and politician, chronic obstructive pulmonary disease.
- Surasak Anakkhaphan, 71, Thai politician, MP (1996–2023).
- Emerenzio Barbieri, 78, Italian politician, deputy (2001–2013).
- William G. Burrill, 91, American Episcopal clergyman, bishop of Rochester (1984–1999).
- Juan Calzadilla, 95, Venezuelan poet, painter and art critic.
- Vanich Chaiyawan, 92, Thai life insurance executive, chairman of Thai Life Insurance (since 1970).
- Petroloukas Chalkias, 90, Greek clarinettist.
- John Farrington, 82, Australian Olympic marathon runner (1968), four-time national champion.
- Yurii Felipenko, 32, Ukrainian actor.
- Max Fink, 102, American neurologist.
- Detlef Gruber, 72, Austrian politician, member of the Landtag of Styria (2000–2015).
- Gusti Irwan Wibowo, 25, Indonesian singer and songwriter.
- Buzz Hargrove, 81, Canadian labour leader, president of the CAW (1992–2008).
- Dennis Hay, 75, Scottish Olympic field hockey player (1972).
- Sven-Åke Johansson, 82, Swedish drummer, composer and visual artist.
- Mohammad Kazemi, 63, Iranian intelligence officer, head of the IRGC Intelligence Organization (since 2022), airstrike.
- Gunther Köhler, 60, German herpetologist.
- William Langewiesche, 70, American author and journalist (The New York Times Magazine, The Atlantic).
- Masuiyama Daishirō II, 76, Japanese sumo wrestler and singer, liver failure.
- Hiroshi Matsumoto, 82, Japanese atmospheric scientist and academic administrator, president of Kyoto University (2008–2014).
- Steve Miller, 81, American sports executive.
- Hassan Mohaqeq, 73–74, Iranian intelligence officer, deputy head of the IRGC Intelligence Organization, airstrike.
- Mostafa Mohsin Montu, 80, Bangladeshi politician, MP (1986–1988).
- Carl Muckler, 84, American politician.
- Krystyna Palmowska, 76, Polish mountain climber, fall.
- Patrick Ryan, 95, Irish defrocked priest and republican (Provisional Irish Republican Army).
- Ralph Scoggins, 93, American politician, member of the Texas House of Representatives (1964–1969).
- Barry Vercoe, 87, New Zealand composer and computer scientist, inventor of Csound.
- John Vincent, 82, American politician, complications from Alzheimer's disease.
- Thornton Willis, 89, American abstract painter, complications from COVID-19 and pneumonia.

=== 16 ===
- Eric C. Bauman, 66, American politician.
- Mangala Bhatt, 62, Indian Kathak dancer.
- Indira Billi, 88, Indian actress (Yamla Jat, Jagga, Kankan De Ohle).
- Charles Chadwick, 92, English novelist.
- Hélio Delmiro, 78, Brazilian guitarist, kidney disease.
- Patti Drew, 80, American R&B singer ("Workin' On a Groovy Thing").
- Dick Edwards, 82, English footballer (Aston Villa, Mansfield Town, Torquay United).
- Forbidden Apple, 30, American Thoroughbred racehorse, euthanised.
- Jacques Gasc, 75, French rugby union player (Graulhet, national team).
- Alia Hogben, 88, Canadian social worker.
- Einar Johansen, 83, Norwegian politician, MP (2000–2001).
- Daniel Kleppner, 92, American physicist (An Introduction to Mechanics), Wolf Prize winner (2005).
- Nikolay Krasnikov, 40, Russian ice speedway rider, traffic collision.
- Mary Alice Dorrance Malone, 75, American businesswoman, heiress to the Campbell's.
- Gabriela Medina, 89, Chilean actress and actors' rights activist.
- Nellai S. Muthu, 74, Indian novelist.
- Patricia Peterson, 99, American journalist and fashion editor (The New York Times).
- Julio Retamal Favereau, 91, Chilean historian, philosopher and academic, member of the Academia Chilena de la Historia.
- Dave Scott, 52, American choreographer (You Got Served, Step Up 2: The Streets), organ failure.
- Ron Taylor, 87, Canadian baseball player (St. Louis Cardinals, New York Mets) and team physician (Toronto Blue Jays), World Series champion (1964, 1969).
- Jan Tesař, 92, Czech historian, writer and dissident.
- Tōno Hiroaki, 85, Japanese Go player, heart failure.
- Kim Woodburn, 83, English television personality (How Clean Is Your House?).
- Manuel Zarzo, 93, Spanish actor (The Delinquents, The Song of the Nightingale, My Love Is Called Margarita).

=== 17 ===
- Alfred Brendel, 94, Austrian pianist, writer, and composer.
- Patricia A. Broderick, 75, American jurist, judge of the DC Superior Court (1998–2020), respiratory infection.
- Anne Burrell, 55, American chef and television personality (Secrets of a Restaurant Chef, Worst Cooks in America, Iron Chef America), suicide by drug overdose.
- Charles Burrell, 104, American classical and jazz bass player.
- Gregg Lee Carter, 73, American sociologist.
- Egon Coordes, 80, German football player (Werder Bremen, VfB Stuttgart) and coach.
- Gilbert Deya, 88, Kenyan evangelist, traffic collision.
- Clark Gruening, 82, American lawyer and politician, member of the Alaska House of Representatives (1975–1979).
- Manuel Hermoso, 89, Spanish politician, president of the Canary Islands (1993–1999).
- Léon Krier, 79, Luxembourgish architect.
- Bernard Lacombe, 72, French football player (Lyon, Bordeaux, national team) and manager.
- François Marcela-Froideval, 66, French role-playing game creator and comic book artist (Black Moon Chronicles).
- Manfred Müller, 82, German politician, MP (1994–2002).
- Diana Oh, 38, American artist and activist, suicide.
- Palanivel Govindasamy, 76, Malaysian politician, MP (1990–2008, 2010–2018) and minister of natural resources (2013–2015).
- Cícero Sandroni, 90, Brazilian journalist and writer (O Globo, Correio da Manhã, Manchete).
- Ali Shadmani, 62, Iranian military officer, commander of Khatam al-Anbiya Central Headquarters (since 2025), airstrike.
- Ilie Slăvei, 73, Romanian Olympic water polo player (1976, 1980).
- Sanjay Raj Subba, 65, Indian politician, Assam MLA (2006–2016).
- Guido Tenesi, 71, American ice hockey player (Hershey Bears) and actor (Slap Shot).
- Jan Vranken, 77, Dutch academic, member of Royal Netherlands Academy of Arts and Sciences.
- Stacy Widelitz, 69, American songwriter ("She's Like the Wind"), metastatic pancreatic cancer.

=== 18 ===
- Imtiaz Ahmed, 90, Pakistani military officer and spy, director-general of the Intelligence Bureau (1990–1993).
- Annika Åhnberg, 75, Swedish politician, minister for agriculture, food and fisheries (1996–1998) and MP (1988–1994).
- Malachi F. Anderson, 93, American politician, member of the Maine House of Representatives (1987–1995).
- Peter Baillie, 91, New Zealand operatic tenor.
- Fred Baker, 73, American engineer (ISC).
- Dimitrije Bjelica, 89, Serbian chess FIDE Master.
- Maruti Chitampalli, 92, Indian naturalist, wildlife conservationist, and writer.
- Lou Christie, 82, American singer-songwriter ("Lightnin' Strikes", "I'm Gonna Make You Mine", "Rhapsody in the Rain"), cancer.
- Ed Clark, 95, American lawyer and politician.
- Patricio Flores Sandoval, 73, Mexican politician, deputy (2006–2009, 2012–2015).
- Giuseppe Gaspari, 92, Italian footballer (Livorno, Catania, Modena).
- Guy Husson, 94, French Olympic hammer thrower (1956, 1960, 1964).
- Teet Järvi, 67, Estonian cellist.
- Konstantin Kokora, 68, Russian Olympic figure skater (1980).
- Gennady Korkin, 61, Russian footballer (Spartak Vladikavkaz, Metallurg Lipetsk, Spartak-UGP Anapa).
- Inge Lindqvist, 90, Swedish Olympic ski jumper (1960).
- Francesco Marenco, 85, Italian politician, deputy (1992–1996).
- Thabet Habib Yousif Al Mekko, 49, Iraqi Chaldean Catholic hierarch, coadjutor bishop (2021–2022) and bishop (since 2022) of Alqosh.
- Leonardo Morlino, 77, Italian political scientist, president of IPSA (2009–2012).
- Henry Mountcharles, 8th Marquess Conyngham, 74, Irish aristocrat, cancer.
- Tom Murphy, 89, American Olympic middle-distance runner (1960).
- Braulio Musso, 95, Chilean footballer (Universidad de Chile, national team).
- Rod Nordland, 75, American journalist (Newsweek, The New York Times) and writer, glioblastoma.
- Leslie Pearl, 72, American singer-songwriter ("You Never Gave Up on Me").
- Brian Pennicott, 87, British major general, cancer.
- Mark Peploe, 82, British screenwriter (The Last Emperor, The Sheltering Sky, Little Buddha), Oscar winner (1988).
- Marcia Resnick, 74, American photographer, lung cancer.
- Mike Rotkin, 79, American politician, five-time mayor of Santa Cruz, California.
- Sam the Wheels, 98, Jamaican-born British filmmaker.
- Natalya Tenyakova, 80, Russian actress (Love and Pigeons, Older Sister, A Frenchman).
- Jesús Zueco Ruiz, 79, Spanish lawyer and politician, member of the Parliament of La Rioja (1983–1991).

=== 19 ===
- Nelly Akopian-Tamarina, 84, Russian pianist.
- Aziza Baroud, 59, Chadian diplomat and politician, MP (2011–2017).
- Jim Bethke, 78, American baseball player (New York Mets).
- Jack Betts, 96, American actor (Spider-Man, One Life to Live, Gods and Monsters).
- Mohammed Boujassoum, 77, Qatari actor.
- John R. Casani, 92, American engineer.
- Sebastián Contín Pellicer, 80, Spanish politician, member of the Aragonese Courts (1991–2003) and senator (1996–2003).
- Francisco Cuoco, 91, Brazilian actor (Selva de Pedra, Pecado Capital, O Astro), multiple organ failure.
- André Fanton, 97, French politician, four-time deputy, MEP (1980–1982, 1984–1989).
- Esperanza García, 50, Spanish lawyer and politician, member of the Catalan parliament (2015–2017, 2019–2020), cancer.
- Francesco Guerra, 82, Italian physicist.
- Bruce Hagen, 94, American politician, North Dakota public service commissioner (1961–2000).
- Roger Haight, 89, American Jesuit theologian, president of the Catholic Theological Society of America (1994–1995).
- Lynn Hamilton, 95, American actress (Sanford and Son, Generations, Dangerous Women).
- Bob Hiegert, 83, American college baseball coach.
- Wes Hildreth, 86, American geologist, traffic collision.
- Grete Randsborg Jenseg, 88, Norwegian actress and author.
- Dorla Eaton Kemper, 95, American civic leader.
- Ayesha Khan, 76, Pakistani actress (Afshan, Aroosa, Mehndi). (body discovered on this date)
- Raymond Laflamme, 64, Canadian theoretical physicist, director of the IQC (2002–2017), cancer.
- Jane Lazarre, 81, American author, liver cancer.
- James Leprino, 87, American businessman (Leprino Foods).
- Ján Ľupták, 79, Slovak politician, MP (1992–1998).
- Geirr Lystrup, 76, Norwegian singer and children's author, complications from amyotrophic lateral sclerosis.
- António Morato, 88, Portuguese footballer (Sporting CP, Vitória, national team).
- Frank Niceley, 78, American politician, member of the Tennessee House of Representatives (1988–1992, 2005–2012) and Senate (2013–2025), heart attack.
- Arthur Ollie, 83, American politician, member of the Iowa House of Representatives (1983–1997).
- John Pitts, 80, American football player (Denver Broncos, Buffalo Bills, Cleveland Browns).
- James Prime, 64, Scottish musician (Deacon Blue), cancer.
- Prafulla Roy, 90, Indian screenwriter (Prithibir Sesh Station, Mondo Meyer Upakhyan, Krantikaal).
- Gailard Sartain, 81, American actor (The Buddy Holly Story, Mississippi Burning, Hey Vern, It's Ernest!).
- Cavin Yarbrough, 71, American musician (Yarbrough and Peoples) and songwriter ("Don't Stop the Music"), complications from heart disease.

=== 20 ===
- Edwin Bhend, 93, Swiss chess player and author.
- David Boyle, 67, British author (The Sum of Our Discontent, Broke: Who Killed the Middle Classes?) and journalist.
- Marita Camacho Quirós, 114, Costa Rican socialite and supercentenarian, first lady (1962–1966).
- Joseph C. Canizaro, 88, American real estate developer and philanthropist, stroke.
- Helen De Cruz, 47, Belgian philosopher.
- Blake Farenthold, 63, American politician, member of the U.S. House of Representatives (2011–2018), heart attack.
- Ivar Giaever, 96, Norwegian-American physicist, Nobel Prize laureate (1973).
- Sir Francis Graham-Smith, 102, British astronomer, astronomer royal (1982–1990).
- Sébastien Groulx, 50, Canadian Olympic weightlifter (2000), helicopter crash.
- Garett Hickling, 54, Canadian wheelchair rugby player, Paralympic silver medalist (2004).
- Pooran Chand Joshi, 69, Indian anthropologist and academic administrator, acting vice-chancellor of Delhi University (2020–2021).
- Ieremias Kalligiorgis, 90, Greek Orthodox archbishop, metropolis of Switzerland (2003–2018), metropolitan of Ancyra (since 2018).
- Lee Seo-yi, 43, South Korean actress.
- Gertrud Leutenegger, 76, Swiss writer.
- Guy James Mangano, 95, American politician and jurist, member of the New York State Assembly (1959–1962) and Senate (1963–1965), and New York Supreme Court (1968–2000).
- Mikhail Maslin, 77, Russian historian of philosophy.
- Ian McLauchlan, 83, Scottish rugby union player (national team, British & Irish Lions).
- Mieczysław Młynarski, 69, Polish basketball player (Górnik Wałbrzych, Lech Poznań, 1980 Olympics).
- Pauli Nevala, 84, Finnish javelin thrower, Olympic champion (1964).
- Kevin Prendergast, 92, Irish racehorse trainer.
- Mikayla Raines, 30, American YouTuber and animal rehabilitator, founder of SaveAFox Rescue, suicide by hanging.
- Tyson R. Roberts, American ichthyologist.
- Stanislav Šárský, 85, Czech actor.
- Katie van Scherpenberg, 84, Brazilian artist.
- Maria Voce, 87, Italian theologian.
- Vladimír Vonka, 94, Czech virologist and academic.
- Patrick Walden, 46, English guitarist (Babyshambles).
- Jules Walter, 95, Antiguan-born British actor (The Wild Geese, A View to a Kill, Doctor Who).
- Yin Fatang, 102, Chinese military officer and politician, party secretary of Tibet (1980–1985).

=== 21 ===
- Nicholas Bomford, 86, English schoolmaster.
- Ivor Catt, 89, British electronics engineer.
- Robert Chang, 83, American materials scientist.
- Ermanno Corsi, 85, Italian writer and journalist.
- Erik Dammann, 94, Norwegian environmentalist, Right Livelihood Award winner (1982).
- Sir David Garrard, 86, British property developer.
- Raïssa Gbédji, 52, Beninese singer and journalist (Radio France Internationale).
- Chuck Hinton, 82, American football player (New York Giants).
- Saeed Izadi, 60–61, Iranian commander, airstrike.
- Danuta Kobylińska-Walas, 93, Polish sea captain.
- Denis Lathoud, 59, French handball player (national team), world champion (1995) and Olympic bronze medalist (1992), blood cancer.
- David Lawrence, 61, English cricketer (Gloucestershire, national team), complications from motor neurone disease.
- Lee Jeong-moo, 84, South Korean politician, MNA (1988–1992, 1996–2000), minister of transport and construction (1998–1999).
- Camila Loboguerrero, 83, Colombian screenwriter, film director and editor.
- Maud Marin, 79, French lawyer and author.
- John McCallum, 75, Canadian politician, ambassador to China (2017–2019), minister of national revenue (2004–2006) and MP (2000–2017).
- Mike McDonagh, 69, Irish humanitarian, aortic aneurysm.
- Zamathembu Ngcobo, 46, South African politician, permanent delegate to the National Council of Provinces (since 2024).
- Patricia Palinkas, 81–82, American football player (Orlando Panthers).
- Umberto Pinardi, 97, Italian footballer (Como, Juventus, Lazio).
- Kailash Purryag, 77, Mauritian politician, president (2012–2015), speaker of the National Assembly (2005–2012), and deputy prime minister (1997–2000).
- Gabor B. Racz, 87, Hungarian-born American anesthesiologist and academic.
- Frederick W. Smith, 80, American transportation industry executive, founder of FedEx.
- Ted Smith, 71, American football player (Ohio State Buckeyes).
- Issar Tabatabai Qomsheh, Iranian nuclear scientist and professor, airstrike.
- Valentina Talyzina, 90, Russian actress (The Irony of Fate, Zigzag of Success, Afonya), People's Artist of the RSFSR (1985).
- Reynaldo Tamayo Sr., 72, Filipino politician, member of the House of Representatives of the Philippines (since 2022).
- Giacomo Tamburelli, Panamanian businessman.
- Harry Watson, 59–60, New Zealand artist.

=== 22 ===
- Aki Aleong, 90, Trinidadian-American actor (V, Braddock: Missing in Action III, Dragon: The Bruce Lee Story), complications from dementia.
- Robert Z. Aliber, 94, American economist and academic.
- Jonathan Lazare Alperin, 88, American mathematician.
- Noel Arrigo, 75, Maltese jurist, chief justice (2002).
- Gerardo Chávez, 87, Peruvian painter, sculptor and visual artist.
- Mircea Chistruga, 77, Moldovan film director.
- Greg Cornwell, 87, Australian politician, member of the ACT House of Assembly (1975–1986) and Legislative Assembly (1992–2004).
- Harold Crichlow, Barbadian dean.
- Thomas R. Dye, 89, American academic.
- Patricia Etnel, 49, Surinamese politician, MP (since 2015).
- Akira Hasegawa, 91, Japanese physicist and engineer.
- Pierre Jean Jeanniot, 92, Canadian businessman, CEO of Air Canada (1984–1990).
- Andrew Kassoy, 55, American finance activist and private equity investor, metastatic prostate cancer.
- Barry Kelly, 64, Northern Irish radiologist and academic, cancer.
- Ventsislav Lakov, 63, Bulgarian politician, MP (2009–2014).
- Guy Lauzon, 81, Canadian politician, MP (2004–2019).
- Dudley Lewis, 62, Welsh footballer (Swansea City, Huddersfield Town, national team).
- Sir Richard Lloyd-Jones, 91, Welsh civil servant, permanent secretary of the Welsh Office (1985–1992).
- Joe Marinelli, 68, American actor (Santa Barbara, The Morning Show, General Hospital), stomach cancer.
- Wally McRae, 89, American cowboy and poet.
- Matt Murray, 54, American baseball player (Atlanta Braves, Boston Red Sox).
- Antonio Negrón García, 84, Puerto Rican jurist, associate justice of the Supreme Court (1974–2000).
- Eileene Parsons, 94, British Virgin Island politician, member of the House of Assembly (1995–2007).
- Francesco Pazienza, 79, Italian intelligence officer (SISMI).
- Arnaldo Pomodoro, 98, Italian sculptor (Sphere Within Sphere).
- Joel Rudnick, 88, American painter and sculptor.
- Jerry A. Shields, 88, American ophthalmologist.
- Rich Stephens, 59, American football player (Los Angeles/Oakland Raiders).
- Franco Testa, 87, Italian pursuit cyclist, Olympic champion (1960).
- Mary Ann Tobin, 83, American politician, member of the Kentucky House of Representatives (1976–1984), auditor of Kentucky (1984–1988).
- Chester Weger, 86, American convicted murderer.
- Terutomo Yamazaki, 77, Japanese karateka, bile duct cancer.

=== 23 ===
- Grace Bakst Wapner, 91, American sculptor.
- Kamal Hanna Bathish, 93, Palestinian Roman Catholic prelate, auxiliary bishop of Jerusalem (1993–2007).
- John Clark, 84, Scottish football player (Celtic, national team) and manager (Clyde).
- Kevin Connor, 92, Australian painter.
- Rebekah Del Rio, 57, American singer and actress (Mulholland Drive), suicide.
- Dilip Doshi, 77, Indian cricketer (Bengal, Nottinghamshire, national team), cardiac arrest.
- Feya Faku, 63, South African trumpeter and flugelhornist.
- Courtenay Griffiths, 69, Jamaican-born British barrister.
- Edward J. Heinz, 92, American lieutenant general.
- Jane Stanton Hitchcock, 78, American novelist, playwright, and screenwriter (Our Time, First Love).
- Mohan Singh Kohli, 93, Indian naval officer and mountaineer (1965 Indian Everest Expedition).
- Gérard Lefranc, 90, French Olympic fencer (1960).
- Li Fubao, 69, Chinese footballer (Jiangsu, national team).
- James Maas, 86, American psychologist.
- Granger Macfarlane, 95, American politician, member of the Virginia Senate (1984–1992).
- John Martin, 94, American publisher, founder of the Black Sparrow Press.
- Lea Massari, 91, Italian actress (L'Avventura, Murmur of the Heart, Christ Stopped at Eboli).
- Russell Mullins, 72, Australian rugby league player (Western Suburbs, Penrith Panthers).
- Adolfo Olivares, 84, Chilean footballer (Bádminton, Santiago Morning, national team).
- Rogelio Onofre, 86, Filipino-American Olympic sprinter (1964).
- Øyvind Østerud, 81, Norwegian political scientist.
- Margit Palme, 85, Austrian painter.
- Yuriy Parfyonov, 79, Russian trumpeter (Auktyon) and composer.
- Susan Beth Pfeffer, 77, American novelist (Life as We Knew It), endometrial cancer.
- Peter Phillips, 86, English artist.
- Mick Ralphs, 81, English Hall of Fame guitarist (Mott the Hoople, Bad Company) and songwriter ("Feel Like Makin' Love"), complications from a stroke.
- Virgil C. Smith, 77, American politician, member of the Michigan House of Representatives (1977–1988) and Senate (1988–2000), chronic obstructive pulmonary disease.
- Rosalind Fox Solomon, 95, American photographer.
- John Tarkpor, 38, Liberian footballer (Mighty Barrolle, Persitara North Jakarta, Persebaya Surabaya).
- Bill Tate, 93, American football player and coach.
- Tong Kai, 88, Hong Kong actor, stunt coordinator and film director, fall.

=== 24 ===
- Garry Ahern, 75, New Zealand sports broadcaster (Radio New Zealand).
- Moses Amweelo, 73, Namibian politician, MNA (since 2000), cancer.
- Georges-Henri Beauthier, 76, Belgian lawyer and jurist.
- Francesco Bruni, 82, Italian linguist and literary historian.
- Martin Cameron, 89, Australian politician, senator (1969) and South Australian MLA (1971–1990).
- Ina Césaire, 82, French playwright and ethnographer.
- Denys Chabot, 80, Canadian writer and journalist.
- Peter Chiswell, 95, British major general.
- John Conklin, 88, American theatre designer.
- Johannes Eide, 87, Norwegian businessman and philanthropist.
- Serge Fiori, 73, Canadian singer (Harmonium).
- Adeline Hoagland, 94, American painter.
- Ene Järvis, 77, Estonian actress (Mõmmi ja aabits, Õnne 13).
- Guzh Manukyan, 88, Armenian actor (Nahapet, The Song of the Old Days), People's Artist of the Armenian SSR (1980).
- Juliana Marins, 26, Brazilian solo traveler, fall. (body discovered on this date)
- Jim Masselos, 84–85, Australian social historian.
- Sylvia Michel, 89, Swiss Reformed minister.
- Gaetano Morazzoni, 92, Italian politician, deputy (1976–1983).
- Clark Olofsson, 78, Swedish criminal (Norrmalmstorg robbery).
- Fred Payne, 98, Australian footballer (Essendon).
- Mudundi Ramakrishna Raju, 95, Indian nuclear physicist.
- Francisco Rebollo López, 86, Puerto Rican jurist, justice of the Supreme Court (1982–2008).
- Mohammad Reza Seddighi Saber, 50, Iranian nuclear scientist, airstrike.
- Diego Seguí, 87, Cuban baseball player (St. Louis Cardinals, Boston Red Sox, Seattle Mariners).
- Bobby Sherman, 81, American singer ("Little Woman", "Julie, Do Ya Love Me") and actor (Here Come the Brides), kidney cancer.
- Alvaro Vitali, 75, Italian actor (Amarcord, The School Teacher, Pierino contro tutti), bronchopneumonia.
- Rainer Wimmer, 69, Austrian politician, four-time MP and mayor of Hallstatt (1988–1993).
- Yu Sung-yup, 65, South Korean politician, MNA (2008–2020) and mayor of Jeongeup (2002–2006), stroke.
- Zhang Boxing, 94, Chinese politician, governor (1986–1987) and party secretary (1987–1994) of Shaanxi.

=== 25 ===
- Boyd Adams, 91, American racing driver (NASCAR).
- Cornelius Adebayo, 84, Nigerian politician, governor of Kwara State (1983).
- Chua Lam, 83, Singaporean-Hong Kong food critic and film producer (Heart of Dragon, The Seventh Curse, Mr. Nice Guy).
- Brandi Collins-Dexter, 44, American author and academic, pancreatic cancer.
- Rocky De Witt, 66, American politician, member of the Iowa Senate (since 2023), pancreatic cancer.
- Meme Ditshego, 60, South African actress (Skorokoro, Love, Sex and 30 Candles).
- Wim van Eekelen, 94, Dutch politician and diplomat, minister of defence (1986–1988), secretary general of the Western European Union (1989–1994), three-time MP.
- Bob Heffner, 86, American baseball player (Boston Red Sox, California Angels, Cleveland Indians).
- Earl Herring, 93, American Olympic sport shooter (1968).
- Martin Izquierdo, 83, Mexican-born American costume designer, cardiovascular disease.
- Richard Gerald Jordan, 79, American convicted murderer, execution by lethal injection.
- Előd Kincses, 84, Romanian-Hungarian lawyer and public writer.
- Ray McVilly, 89, Australian footballer (Hawthorn).
- John Mew, 96, British orthodontist (Mewing).
- Hitoshi Morishita, 57, Japanese football player (Tosu Futures) and manager (Zweigen Kanazawa, Giravanz Kitakyushu).
- Mahshid Moshiri, 73, Iranian novelist and lexicographer.
- John Peoples Jr., 92, American physicist.
- Gerry Philbin, 83, American football player (New York Jets, Philadelphia Eagles, New York Stars), complications from dementia.
- Pat Williams, 87, American politician, member of the U.S. House of Representatives (1979–1997) and Montana House of Representatives (1967–1969).

=== 26 ===
- Kine Aune, 82, Norwegian animator.
- René Bertrand, 53, Argentine actor (Casado con hijos, El amor tiene cara de mujer) and stage director.
- Rouslan Bodelan, 83, Ukrainian politician, mayor of Odesa (1998–2005), MP (1992–1997), and governor of Odesa Oblast (1995–1998).
- David Boyd, 74, Canadian author.
- Bob Brunet, 78, American football player (Washington Redskins).
- Chuck Burke, 94, American Olympic speed skater (1952, 1956).
- Óscar Carrillo, 59, Peruvian actor and stage and television director.
- Surendra Dubey, 71, Indian poet, heart attack.
- Robert Hagemes, 89, American bobsledder.
- Monika Hansen, 83, German actress (Put on Ice, Faraway, So Close!, The Promise).
- Rick Hurst, 79, American actor (The Dukes of Hazzard, Steel Magnolias, Earth Girls Are Easy).
- Peter Hutchinson, 95, British-born American artist.
- Tulkun Kasimov, 79, Uzbek military officer, chief of the general staff (2000–2003).
- Bob Kelley, 95, American football player (Philadelphia Eagles, Hamilton Tiger-Cats).
- Takutai Tarsh Kemp, 50, New Zealand politician, MP (since 2023), kidney disease.
- Carolyn McCarthy, 81, American politician, member of the U.S. House of Representatives (1997–2015).
- Winston H. McCarty, 96, American politician, member of the New Hampshire House of Representatives (1992–2000), heart attack.
- Terry McGee, 89, New Zealand geographer.
- Clarence V. Monin, 84, American railway engineer.
- Bill Moyers, 91, American journalist and political commentator (Bill Moyers Journal), White House press secretary (1965–1967), prostate cancer.
- Muhammad Nur Manuty, 75, Malaysian Islamic scholar, writer, and politician, senator (2015–2018).
- Ocasional Talento, 29, Bolivian rapper, fall.
- Letícia Román, 83, Italian-American actress (Gold of the Seven Saints, Fanny Hill, G.I. Blues).
- Lalo Schifrin, 93, Argentine-born American film and television composer (Mission: Impossible, Dirty Harry, Rush Hour), five-time Grammy Award winner, complications from pneumonia.
- Robbie Stuart, 77, New Zealand rugby union player (Hawke's Bay, national team) and coach (Hawke's Bay).
- Jarosław Studzizba, 69, Polish footballer (Górnik Zabrze, Lechia Gdańsk, Eintracht Braunschweig).
- Paddy Summerfield, 96, English artist and poet.
- Michael Toner, 81, British journalist and writer.
- Georgios Tryfonidis, 80, Greek politician, MP (1993–2004, 2007–2009).

=== 27 ===
- Dragoljub Acković, 72, Serbian writer, academic, and politician, deputy (2020–2024).
- B. D. Behring, 79, Indian politician, MP (1990).
- Richard A. Boucher, 73, American diplomat, spokesperson for the U.S. Department of State (1992–1993, 2001–2005), spindle cell sarcoma.
- Yves Camus, 95, French Olympic sprinter.
- Catherine A. Costa, 99, American politician, member of the New Jersey General Assembly (1982–1984) and Senate (1984–1990).
- Bill Dellinger, 91, American middle-distance runner, Olympic bronze medalist (1964).
- Bill Denehy, 79, American baseball player (Detroit Tigers, New York Mets).
- Eli Ellis, 76, Australian Olympic sport shooter (1984).
- Steve Hickey, 58, American politician, member of the South Dakota House of Representatives (2011–2015).
- Barry Hills, 88, British thoroughbred horse trainer.
- Alan K. Huggins, 89, British philatelist.
- Shefali Jariwala, 42, Indian reality show personality (Nach Baliye, Bigg Boss) and actress (Baby Come Naa), cardiac arrest.
- Sir Sydney Lipworth, 94, South African insurance executive, co-founder of Allied Dunbar.
- Jeff McCloy, 75, Australian property developer and politician, Lord Mayor of Newcastle (2012–2014).
- Ed Mickelson, 98, American baseball player (St. Louis Browns, Chicago Cubs).
- Terry Miles, 88, English footballer (Port Vale).
- Charles H. Mitchell, 85, American football player (Denver Broncos) and educator (Seattle Community College System).
- Toe Nash, 43, American baseball player (Princeton Devil Rays).
- Ruy Carlos Ostermann, 90, Brazilian writer and politician, Rio Grande do Sul MLA (1983–1991), complications from pneumonia.
- Jim Parkinson, 83, American type designer, complications from Alzheimer's disease.
- Tim Pollard, 61, English actor and entertainer (Robin Hood), cancer.
- Daniel Postgate, 61, English scriptwriter, author and illustrator.
- Hosken Powell, 70, American baseball player (Minnesota Twins, Toronto Blue Jays).
- Hans-Joachim Queisser, 93, German physicist.
- Joseph Martin Sartoris, 97, American Roman Catholic prelate, auxiliary bishop of Los Angeles (1994–2002).
- Takahiro Shiraishi, 34, Japanese convicted serial killer, execution by hanging.
- Ileana Silai, 83, Romanian middle-distance runner, Olympic silver medalist (1968).
- Paolo Sirena, 79, Italian footballer (Verona, Roma, Treviso).
- Juraj Soboňa, 64, Slovak politician, MP (2018–2020).
- Kashmir Singh Sohal, 62, Indian politician, Punjab MLA (since 2022), esophageal cancer.
- Žiža Stojanović, 94, Serbian actress (Otpisani).
- Charles Wilkins, 86, American chemist.

=== 28 ===
- Harold Allison, 94, Australian politician, South Australian minister of education (1979–1982).
- Thomas N. Bisson, 94, American historian and medievalist.
- Luis Germán Cajiga, 90, Puerto Rican painter and poet.
- Giuseppe Caterina, 82, Italian politician, mayor of Isernia (1995–2001), member of the Regional Council of Molise (2001–2006).
- Jack D. Cowan, 91–92, British mathematician and theoretical neuroscientist, kidney failure.
- Gilda Cruz-Romo, 85, Mexican operatic soprano (Metropolitan Opera).
- Aminu Dantata, 94, Nigerian oil industry executive and banker.
- Bob Elmore, 65, American stuntman (The Texas Chainsaw Massacre 2, Pirates of the Caribbean, Casino).
- Joe Epperson, 80, American camera operator (Full House, All in the Family, The Jeffersons) and cinematographer.
- Germán Gullón, 80, Spanish literary critic, cancer.
- Ron Johanson, 76, Australian cinematographer (Freedom).
- Ihor Kalynets, 85, Ukrainian poet and Soviet dissident.
- Wayne Larkins, 71, English cricketer (Northamptonshire, national team), heart failure.
- D. Wayne Lukas, 89, American Hall of Fame horse trainer, four-time Kentucky Derby winner, MRSA.
- Giuseppe Martellotta, 83, Italian politician, president of Apulia (1994–1995).
- Klaus Mylius, 94, German indologist.
- Saquib Nachan, Indian convicted terrorist, complications from a brain haemorrhage.
- Tigran Nalbandian, 50, Armenian chess grandmaster.
- Frederick M. Nicholas, 105, American lawyer.
- Kevin Nunis, 65, Malaysian Olympic field hockey player (1984).
- Martin Olley, 61, English cricketer (Hertfordshire, Middlesex, Cambridgeshire).
- Giuseppe Orefici, 79, Italian archaeologist.
- José Ornellas, 103, Brazilian politician, governor of the Federal District (1982–1985), Federal District MLC (1991–1995).
- Bud Otis, 86, American publisher and politician.
- Dave Parker, 74, American Hall of Fame baseball player (Cincinnati Reds, Pittsburgh Pirates, Oakland Athletics), World Series champion (1979, 1989), complications from Parkinson's disease.
- Kayode Peters, 49, Nigerian actor, producer, and director.
- Carlos Schvartzman, 77, Paraguayan musician, composer, and arranger.
- Sudjadnan Parnohadiningrat, 72, Indonesian diplomat.
- Gyula Tóth, 80, Hungarian footballer (Budapest Honvéd, Zalaegerszeg).
- Jacques Vergnes, 76, French footballer (Nîmes, Montpellier, national team).
- Rod Welford, 66, Australian politician, Queensland MLA/MP (1989–2009).
- Chris Willingham, 74, American film and television editor (24, The A-Team, Dragonball Evolution), Emmy winner (2002, 2003, 2004).

=== 29 ===
- S. Daniel Abraham, 100, American medical industry executive and philanthropist, founder of SlimFast.
- Chandler Atwood, 46, American brigadier general, commander of Space Delta 7 (2020–2022).
- Hussain Al Baharna, 92, Bahraini lawyer, legal advisor and politician.
- Brian Banda, 29, Zimbabwean footballer (Platinum), traffic collision.
- Wolfgang Böhmer, 89, German politician, minister-president of Saxony-Anhalt (2002–2011) and president of the Bundesrat (2002–2003).
- Mark Brokaw, 66, American theatre director (How I Learned to Drive), prostate cancer.
- Stuart Burrows, 92, Welsh operatic tenor.
- Mabandla Dlamini, 94, Swazi politician, prime minister (1979–1983).
- Jamal Ejlali, 78, Iranian actor.
- Sandy Gall, 97, Scottish journalist and television presenter.
- Oliver Gibson, 53, American football player (Pittsburgh Steelers, Cincinnati Bengals).
- Maureen Hingert, 88, Sri Lankan actress (Fort Bowie, Gun Fever) and beauty queen (Miss Ceylon 1955).
- Ronny Jarabo, 85, Puerto Rican politician, member (1973–1993) and speaker (1985–1993) of the House of Representatives.
- Jack Knight, 87, American actor.
- Pablo Lorenzini, 75, Chilean politician, member (1998–2022) and president (2004–2005) of the Chamber of Deputies.
- Pentti Matikainen, 74, Finnish ice hockey coach and manager (national team), cancer.
- Ursula Munch-Petersen, 87, Danish ceramicist.
- Gaston Oula, 74, Ivorian Olympic judoka.
- Alan Peacock, 87, English footballer (Middlesbrough, Leeds United, national team), complications from dementia.
- Paco Pérez Durán, 63, Spanish footballer (Castilla, Alcoyano, Linares), complications from amyotrophic lateral sclerosis.
- Navamani Elia Peter, 92, Indian theologian and evangelist.
- Seán Rice, 83, Northern Irish Gaelic footballer (Éire Óg, Antrim) and hurler.
- Arlene Singer, 76, American politician, member of the Ohio House of Representatives (1987–1988).
- József Tajti, 81, Hungarian football player (Budapest Honvéd) and coach (Fehérvár, BVSC Budapest).
- Maksym Ustymenko, 31, Ukrainian fighter pilot, plane crash.
- Antonio Vargas, 66, Ecuadorian politician.
- Alan Weinberger, 79, American educator and entrepreneur.

=== 30 ===
- Ismail Abu Hatab, 32, Palestinian photojournalist and filmmaker, airstrike.
- Frank Barrie, 88, British actor (Lunch with Marlene, EastEnders).
- Ion Cernea, 91, Romanian Greco-Roman wrestler, world champion (1965) and Olympic silver medallist (1960).
- Pierre Cogen, 93, French organist and composer.
- Kenneth Colley, 87, English actor (Star Wars, Monty Python's Life of Brian, Firefox), complications from COVID-19 and pneumonia.
- Ian Day, 90, Australian footballer (West Adelaide, South Adelaide).
- Luis Pascual Dri, 98, Argentine Roman Catholic cardinal, cardinal-deacon of Sant'Angelo in Pescheria (since 2023).
- Robert C. Dynes, 82, Canadian-American physicist and academic administrator, president of the UC (2003–2007) and chancellor of the UCSD (1996–2003).
- Ferenc Grunwalsky, 82, Hungarian cinematographer, director, and screenwriter.
- Magnús Þór Hafsteinsson, 61, Icelandic politician, MP (2003–2007), drowned.
- Siegmund Helms, 84, German musicologist.
- Saverio Indrio, 62, Italian voice actor and dubbing director.
- Loveday King, 89, English darts player.
- Lucian Leape, 94, American physician and medical scholar, heart failure.
- Gamini Lokuge, 82, Sri Lankan politician, cabinet minister, MP (1983–2024).
- Joan Mellen, 83, American author and professor.
- Nydia Quintero, 93, Colombian philanthropist, first lady (1978–1982), respiratory failure.
- William C. Rogers III, 86, American Navy captain.
- Wanda dos Santos, 93, Brazilian Olympic hurdler (1952, 1960), blood infection.
- Lajos Sătmăreanu, 81, Romanian football player (FCSB, national team) and manager (Bihor Oradea).
- Nicola Savino, 87, Italian politician, deputy (1987–1994).
- Mohammad Shaheen, 87, Jordanian literary scholar.
- Roger Shoals, 86, American football player (Detroit Lions, Cleveland Browns, Denver Broncos).
- Jim Shooter, 73, American comic book writer (Secret Wars, Superman) and editor (Marvel Comics), esophageal cancer.
- J. Roland Smith, 92, American politician, member of the South Carolina House of Representatives (1989–2014).
- Michael Sommer, 73, German trade unionist, president of the International Trade Union Confederation (2010–2014).
- Thio Su Mien, 86, Singaporean lawyer and academic, acute myeloid leukemia.
- Norman Toynton, 86, British abstract painter.
- Ctibor Turba, 80, Czech actor, pedagogue, and director.
