= Heidemarie =

- Gender: Female
- Language: German

Other names
- Related names: Heidi, Marie

Heidemarie is a given name. Notable people with the name include:

- Heidemarie Bártová (born 1965), female diver from the Czech Republic
- Heidemarie Cammerlander (born 1942), Austrian politician (The Greens)
- Heidemarie Fuentes, American actress and producer
- Heidemarie Hatheyer (1918–1990), Austrian film actress
- Heidemarie Stefanyshyn-Piper (born 1963), American Naval officer and former NASA astronaut
- Heidemarie Steiner (born 1944), German figure skater and coach
- Heidemarie Unterreiner (1944–2025), Austrian politician
- Heidemarie Wieczorek-Zeul (born 1942), German politician (SPD)
- Heidemarie Wright (born 1951), German politician (SPD)

== Fictional characters ==
- Heidemarie W. Schnaufer, a character from the anime/manga Strike Witches
