= Sujata Patel =

Indian sociologist

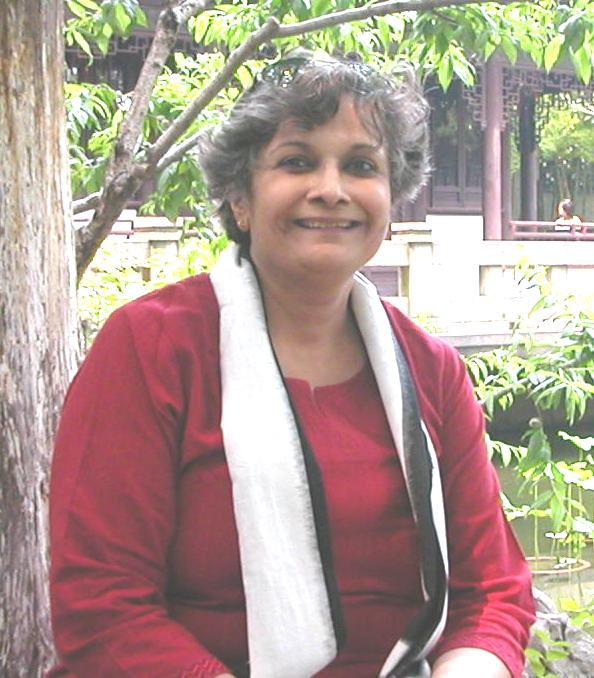
Sujata Patel

Sujata Patel is an Indian sociologist, currently holding the position of National Fellow at the Indian Institute of Advanced Study.

== Bibliography ==
=== Authored and edited books ===
- The ISA Handbook of Diverse Sociological Traditions (London: Sage, 2010)
- Urban Studies. Readers in Sociology and Social Anthropology (Co-editor) (Delhi: OUP, 2006)
- Bombay and Mumbai. The City in Transition (Co-edited with Jim Masselos) (Delhi: OUP, 2003)
- Thinking Social Science in India. Essays in Honour of Alice Thorner. (Co-editor with Jashodhara Bagchi and Krishna Raj)(New Delhi: Sage, 2002)
- Bombay Metaphor for Modern India (Co-editor with Alice Thorner) (Bombay and Delhi: Oxford University Press, 1995/96/2000)
- Bombay Mosaic of Modern Culture (Co-editor with Alice Thorner) (Bombay and Delhi: Oxford University Press, 1995/96/2000)
- Making of Industrial Relations. Ahmedabad Textile Industry 1918–1939 (Delhi: Oxford University Press, 1986)

=== Selected journal articles and book chapters ===
- Sociology’s ‘Other’. The Debate on European Universals in The Encyclopaedia of Life Support Systems (Social Sciences and Humanities), UNESCO, 2010.www.eolss.net
- Seva, sangathanas and gurus: service and the making of the Hindu nation in Gurpreet Mahajan and Surinder Jodhka (ed.s) Religion, Community and Development, Delhi, Routledge2010
- Introduction. Diversities of Sociological Traditions in Sujata Patel, (ed) The ISA Handbook of Diverse Sociological Traditions, Sage London, 2010
- At crossroads. Sociology in India in Sujata Patel, (ed) The ISA Handbook of Diverse Sociological Traditions, Sage, London, 2010
- In Conversation with Professor Sujata Patel, Interview with Pooja Adhikary, ISA E Bulletin, Number 14, November 2009
- Doing Urban Studies in India. The Challenges. Special issue on Indian Sociology, South African Review of Sociology, 40 (1) 2009
- The Ethnography of the Labouring Poor in India Introduction, The Jan Breman Omnibus, Delhi, Oxford University Press, 2007
- Towards a praxiological understanding of Indian Society The Sociology of A.R. Desai in Satish Deshpande, Nandini Sundar and Patricia Uberoi (ed.s) Anthropology of the East: The Indian Foundations of a Global Discipline, New Delhi, Permanent Black, 2007
- Sociological Study of Religion, Colonial Modernity, and Nineteenth Century Majoritarianism. Economic and Political Weekly, 42 (13), 1089–1094. 2007
- Mumbai. The Mega-City of a Poor Country in Klaus Segbers (ed) The Making of Global City Regions: Johannesburg, Mumbai/Bombay, São Paulo, and Shanghai, Baltimore, Johns Hopkins Press, 2007
- Empowerment, Co-option, and Domination: The Politics of Employment Guarantee Scheme of Maharashtra in Economic and Political Weekly, 41 (50) 5126–5133, 2006
- Urban Studies: An Exploration in Theory and Practices in Sujata Patel and Kushal Deb (ed.s) Urban Studies, Reader in Sociology and Social Anthropology (Series Editor TN Madan) Delhi, Oxford University Press, 2006
- Beyond Binaries. Towards Self Reflexive Sociologies, Current Sociology, 54 (3), 381–395, 2006
- Challenges to Sociological Practices in India Today, International Sociological Association E Bulletin, Spring March 2006
- Regional Politics, City Conflicts and Communal Riots: Ahmedabad 1985–86 in Rajendra Vora and Anne Feldhouse (eds) Region and Regionalism, New Delhi Manohar, 353–376, 2006
