= Richard Eakin =

Richard Eakin may refer to:

- Richard M. Eakin (1910–1999), American zoologist
- Richard R. Eakin (born 1938), chancellor of East Carolina University
