= Vanich Chaiyawan =

Thai businessman (1932–2025)

- วานิช ไชยวรรณ 侯業順
- Born: 18 November 1932; Siam
- Died: 15 June 2025 (aged 92); Bangkok, Thailand
- Occupation: Businessman
- Known for: 70% owner, Thai Life
- Title: Chairman, Thai Life Insurance
- Children: 8

Vanich Chaiyawan (Thai: วานิช ไชยวรรณ; Chinese: 侯業順; pinyin: Hóu Yèshùn; 18 November 1932 – 15 June 2025) was a Thai billionaire businessman who was chairman of Thai Life Insurance, the second-largest life insurer in Thailand.

== Early life ==
Vanich Chaiyawan was born on 18 November 1932. He came from a Thai Chinese family.

== Career ==
Chaiyawan owned about 60% of Thai Life, which is now run by his son Chai Chaiyawan as president. He also owned Thai Asia Pacific Brewery and Thai Credit Retail Bank.

== Personal life and death ==
Chaiyawan was married with eight children and lived in Bangkok.

Chaiyawan died on 15 June 2025, at the age of 92.
