= Frederick M. Nicholas =

American lawyer (1920–2025)

Frederick Mortimer Nicholas (May 30, 1920 – June 28, 2025) was an American lawyer specializing in real estate development and leases. He was known as "Mr. Downtown Culture" for his role in building the Museum of Contemporary Art, Los Angeles, the Geffen Contemporary, the Walt Disney Concert Hall and for the founding of Public Counsel, the largest pro-bono law firm in the nation. He died on June 28, 2025, at age 105.
