= Ulrich Schindel =

German classical philologist (1935–2025)

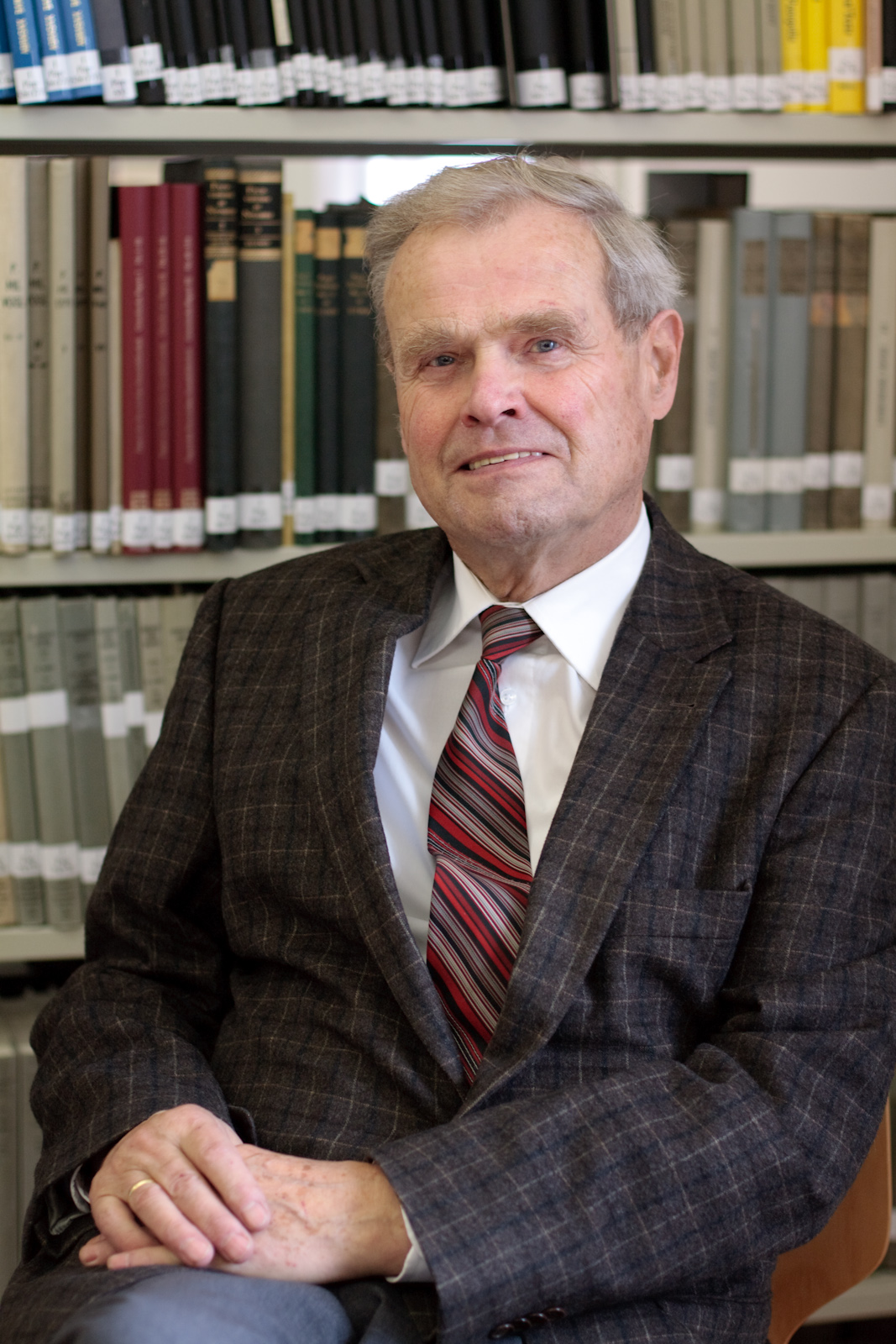
- Born: 10 September 1935; Frankfurt am Main, Gau Hesse-Nassau, Germany
- Died: 13 June 2025 (aged 89); Göttingen, Lower Saxony, Germany
- Occupation: Professor

Academic background
- Education: University of Göttingen; LMU Munich; University of Hamburg
- Thesis: Demosthenes in the 18th century (1961)

Academic work
- Discipline: Classical philology
- Institutions: University of Göttingen

Ulrich Schindel (10 September 1935 – 13 June 2025) was a German classical philologist.

== Life and career ==
Schindel was born on 10 September 1935. He earned his doctorate from the University of Göttingen in 1961, his thesis being Demosthenes in the 18th century (Demosthenes im 18. Jahrhundert). In 1971, Schindel received his habilitation. From 1974 to 1976 he was associate professor until he succeeded Will Richter as Full Professor of Classics. He taught Latin and Greek literature until his retirement as professor emeritus in 2003.

His main field of study was the history and transmission of ancient grammatic and rhetoric literature. Also, Schindel was interested in reception history and the history of classical scholarship.

Schindel died on 13 June 2025, at the age of 89.
