= Sebastián Contín Pellicer =

Spanish politician (1944–2025)

Member of the Senate of Spain for Zaragoza
- In office 12 April 1996 – 17 July 2003

Member of the Cortes of Aragon for Zaragoza
- In office 20 June 1991 – 20 June 2003

Personal details
- Born: 3 November 1944 Sigüés, Spain
- Died: 19 June 2025 (aged 80)
- Party: PP
- Education: University of Zaragoza
- Occupation: Doctor

Sebastiàn Contín Pellicer (3 November 1944 – 19 June 2025) was a Spanish politician. A member of the People's Party, he served in the Cortes of Aragon from 1991 to 2003 and in the Senate from 1996 to 2003.

Contín died on 19 June 2025, at the age of 80.
