= Pierre Cogen =

French organist and composer (1931–2025)

Pierre Cogen (2 October 1931 – 30 June 2025) was a French organist, composer and teacher.

== Life and career ==
Born in Paris, Cogen studied at the Schola Cantorum. His compositions are primarily for the organ, and he recorded music by Langlais, Tournemire and others. Cogen died on 30 June 2025, at the age of 93.
