= Václav Toužimský =

Czech photographer (1935–2025)

- Born: 8 May 1935; Liberec, Czechoslovakia
- Died: 13 June 2025 (aged 90)
- Occupation: Photographer

Václav Toužimský (8 May 1935 – 13 June 2025) was a Czech photographer, best known for his images of the occupation of Czechoslovakia in August 1968. His iconic photograph of a Soviet tank crashing into an arcade on Liberec's square became a symbol of the events of the time.

== Life and work ==
Toužimský was studied photography and photochemistry in Hradec Králové. He then worked as a professional photographer at the Fotocentrála in Liberec.

On 21 August 1968, he photographed the arrival of the Warsaw Pact troops from a scaffolding at his house. The following day, he took a series of photographs depicting the shooting and deaths of civilians in Liberec. His photograph of a Soviet tank destroying a house in an arcade became one of the most famous photographs of the occupation.

After 1969, his activities were restricted and his negatives confiscated by the State Security, but after the Velvet Revolution some were returned to him. He died on 13 June 2025, at the age of 90.

== Awards and honours ==
- 2018 – Tribute from the Governor of the Liberec Region
- 2022 – Medal of the City of Liberec
