= Rich Hulkow =

American football player, coach

Biographical details
- Born: February 2, 1950; Attleboro, Massachusetts, U.S.
- Died: June 5, 2025 (aged 75)
- Education: Michigan State University; Eastern Michigan University

Playing career
- Position: Defensive Tackle

Coaching career (HC unless noted)
- 1984–2009: Marshall HS (MI)
- 2010–2011: University of Olivet

Administrative career (AD unless noted)
- 1984–2009: Marshall HS (MI)

Head coaching record
- Overall: 1–19 (college); 210–84 (high School)

Accomplishments and honors

Championships
- 11x League Champion (HS); 13 MHSAA Playoff Appearances; 5x MHSAA Semifinal Appearances; 3x MHSAA Final Appearances; 2x MHSAA State Champion (1996, 2009); MHSFCA All-Star Game Champions Head Coach (West Squad) Score: West 28–East 17 (2000)

Awards
- Inducted into the Michigan High School Football Coaches Association Hall of Fame (2003); MHSAA Coach of the Year (D4) (2009); 5x MHSAA Regional Coach of the Year; Detroit Free Press Dream Team Coach of the Year (2009); Detroit Lions Coach of the Year (2009)

Rich Hulkow was an American former Division I collegiate football player and high school and college football coach.

== Head coaching record ==
=== High school ===
Year	Team	Overall	Conference	Standing	Bowl/playoffs
Aledo Green Dragons (Olympic Conference) (1981–1993)
1981	Aledo	6–3	5–2	2nd	
1982	Aledo	7–2	6–3	T–2nd	
1983	Aledo	?–?	?–?	?	
Montrose:		?–?	?–?		
Marshall Redhawks (Twin Valley Conference) (1984–2000)
1984	Marshall	5–4	3–4		
1985	Marshall	8–1	6–1		
1986	Marshall	8–1	6–1		
1987	Marshall	8–1	6–1		
1988	Marshall	7–2	5–2		
1989	Marshall	6–3	4–3		
1990	Marshall	7–3	5–2		L MHSAA Class BB Pre-regional
1991	Marshall	6–3	5–2		
1992	Marshall	8–1	6–1		
1993	Marshall	10–2	6–1		L MHSAA Class BB Semifinal
1994	Marshall	5–4	3–4		
1995	Marshall	7–3	4–2		L MHSAA Class BB Pre-regional
1996	Marshall	12–1	6–1		W MHSAA Class BB State Championship
1997	Marshall	12–1	7–0		L MHSAA Class BB State Championship
1998	Marshall	5–4	5–2		
1999	Marshall	8–3	6–1		L MHSAA Division 4 District
2000	Marshall	5–4	4–3		
Marshall Redhawks (Southwestern Michigan Athletic Conference) (2001–2009)
2001	Marshall	11–2	4–0		L MHSAA Division 4 Semifinal
2002	Marshall	9–2	4–0		L MHSAA Division 4 District
2003	Marshall	5–5	1–3		L MHSAA Division 4 Pre-district
2004	Marshall	6–4	2–2		L MHSAA Division 4 Pre-district
2005	Marshall	7–3	2–2		L MHSAA Division 3 Pre-district
2006	Marshall	5–4	4–0		
2007	Marshall	4–5	2–3		
2008	Marshall	8–3	4–1		L MHSAA Division 4 Regional
2009	Marshall	13–1	6–1		W MHSAA Dvision 4 State Championship
Marshall:		197–64	117–43		
Total:		197–64			
National championship Conference title Conference division title or championship game berth

=== College ===
Year	Team	Overall	Conference	Standing	Bowl/playoffs
Olivet Comets (Michigan Intercollegiate Athletic Association) (2010–2011)
2010	Olivet	0–10	0–6	6th	
2011	Olivet	1–9	1–5	T–5th	
Olivet:		1–19	1–11		
Total:		1–19			
