= Giuseppe Parlato =

Italian historian (1952–2025)

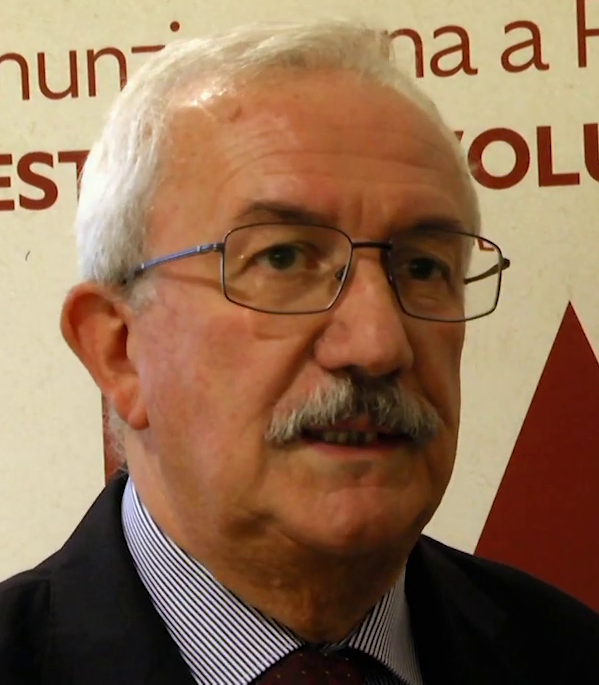
Parlato in 2019

Giuseppe Parlato (29 May 1952 – 2 June 2025) was an Italian historian.

== Life and career ==
Parlato was born in Milan on 29 May 1952. Following graduation he relocated to Rome, and since 1981 he was a researcher in contemporary history at the Sapienza University of Rome at the chair of Renzo De Felice. From 1992 to 1994 he taught history of trade unionism and the workers' movement at the Faculty of Law of the University of Camerino. He was a full professor of contemporary history at the Faculty of Interpreting and Translation of the International University of Rome, a university of which he was dean and rector.

On 10 May 2023 he was awarded the title of professor emeritus by the International University of Rome.

Parlato died on 2 June 2025, at the age of 73.
