= Ibrahima N'Diaye =

Malian politician (1948–2025)

Ibrahima N'Diaye (2 May 1948 – 6 June 2025) was a Malian politician who served in the government of Mali as Minister of Employment and Vocational Training. He was also Second Vice-President of the Alliance for Democracy in Mali (ADEMA).

== Life and career ==
N'Diaye was born in Kayes on 2 May 1948. At ADEMA's Constitutive Congress, held on 25–26 May 1991, he was elected as Deputy Secretary for Solidarity. He was subsequently elected as the Secretary-General of ADEMA at the party's First Ordinary Congress in September 1994; after five years in that post, he was instead elected as ADEMA's Second Vice-President in October 1999. He also served as Mayor of Bamako, the capital, from 1998 to 2003.

While speaking on television on 6 March 2001, N'Diaye said that magistrates in Mali were corrupt; together with Sidiki Konaté, the director of state television, he was accused of defamation by the Malian Union of Judges. In mid-May 2001, he and Konaté were sentenced to one month in jail and fined 1.5 million CFA francs.

N'Diaye died on 6 June 2025, at the age of 77.
