= Brian Banda =

Zimbabwean footballer (1995–2025)

Personal information
- Full name: Brian Jasper Banda
- Date of birth: 9 September 1995
- Place of birth: Bulawayo, Zimbabwe
- Date of death: 29 June 2025 (aged 29)
- Place of death: Bulawayo, Zimbabwe
- Position: Midfielder

Senior career*
Years	Team	Apps	(Gls)
2016–2020	Highlanders		
2021–2024	F.C. Platinum		

International career
2021–2024	Zimbabwe	9	(0)
- * Club domestic league appearances and goals

Brian Jasper Banda (9 September 1995 – 29 June 2025) was a Zimbabwean footballer who played as a midfielder.

== International career ==
Banda made his debut for the Zimbabwe national team on 7 July 2021, in a 0–0 draw against Mozambique in the 2021 COSAFA Cup where he was booked. He earned nine caps, his last cap being on 2 November 2024 in a 1–0 loss to Swaziland in the 2024 African Nations Championship qualifier.

== Death ==
Banda died on 29 June 2025, at the age of 29, after being involved in a car collision on the highway that connects the cities of Zvishavane and Bulawayo. Two other people died in the incident.
