= Surasak Anakkhaphan =

Thai politician (1953–2025)

- สุรศักดิ์ อนรรฆพันธ์

Member of the House of Representatives of Thailand for Phetchabun province
- In office 17 November 1996 – 20 March 2023

Personal details
- Born: Surasak Anakkhaphan; 20 July 1953 Nong Phai district, Thailand
- Died: 15 June 2025 (aged 71) Bangkok, Thailand
- Party: Social Action Party (1996–2001); TRT (2001–2007); PT (2011–2018); Palang Pracharath Party (2018–2023)
- Education: Ramkhamhaeng University (BEc); National Institute of Development Administration (MPA)
- Occupation: Politician

Surasak Anakkhaphan (Thai: สุรศักดิ์ อนรรฆพันธ์; 20 July 1953 – 15 June 2025) was a Thai politician who was a member of multiple political parties, he served in the House of Representatives from 1996 to 2023.

Anakkhaphan died in Bangkok on 15 June 2025, at the age of 71.
