= José Martins Jr. =

Portuguese politician (1938–2025)

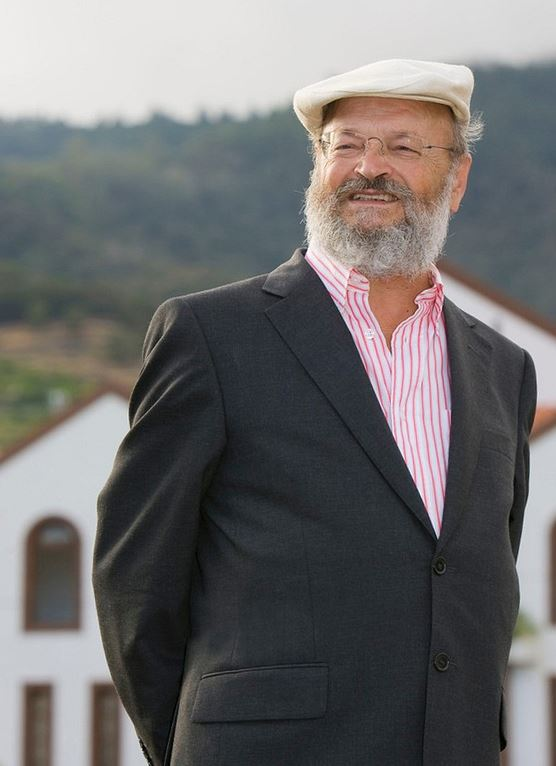
- Martins in 2017

Member of the Legislative Assembly of Madeira
- In office 13 October 1996 – 6 May 2007
- In office 27 June 1976 – 11 November 1992

Personal details
- Born: 16 November 1938; Machico, Portugal
- Died: 12 June 2025 (aged 86); Machico, Portugal
- Political party: UDP; PS
- Occupation: Priest

José Martins Jr. (16 November 1938 – 12 June 2025) was a Portuguese politician. A member of the Popular Democratic Union, he served in the Legislative Assembly of Madeira from 1976 to 1988 and again from 1996 to 2007.

Martins died in Machico on 12 June 2025, at the age of 86.
