= Isidoro Galán =

Spanish priest and trade unionist (1935–2025)

Isidoro Galán Carretero (23 December 1935 – 2 June 2025) was a Spanish priest, construction worker and trade unionist, delegate of the CC.OO trade union.

== Career ==
Galán joined the Society of Jesus in 1951, in Aranjuez, at the age of 16, and studied Philosophy and Theology. He was ordained a priest on 15 July 1965, at the age of 30, in the Jesuit church in Madrid.

He was an active priest in Cartagena in the 1960s, after arriving in 1968. Together with Mariano González Mangada and Miguel Ángel Ondínez, he promoted the Ecclesial Communities of Base and the HOAC, and as a result he suffered Francoist repression: on 14 November 1972, along with other priests, he was arrested, beaten, imprisoned and temporarily exiled from Cartagena for organizing subversive actions.

Following these events, he joined the Dragados y Construcciones construction company, and became a union leader. He led the Murcian construction strike of 1976 in Cartagena.

Throughout his life, he showed solidarity with the Basque independence movement.

== Death ==
Galán died on 2 June 2025, at the age of 89.
