= Mohammed Hamoud Al-Fajji =

Kuwaiti politician (1940–2025)

- محمد حمود الفجي

Member of the National Assembly of Kuwait
- In office 19 July 2003 – 21 May 2006

Personal details
- Born: 1940 Kuwait City, Kuwait
- Died: 2 June 2025 (aged 85)
- Party: Independent
- Occupation: Politician, businessman

Mohammed Hamoud Al-Fajji (Arabic: محمد حمود الفجي; 1940 – 2 June 2025) was a Kuwaiti politician and businessman who was an independent, he served in the National Assembly from 2003 to 2006.

Al-Fajji died on 2 June 2025, at the age of 85.
