= Teresa Rita Lopes =

Portuguese writer (1937–2025)

Maria Teresa Rita Lopes (12 September 1937 – 14 June 2025) was a Portuguese writer, known for her research on the work of Fernando Pessoa.

== Biography ==
Lopes was born in Faro on 12 September 1937. She was a full professor of Comparative Literatures at the Faculty of Social Sciences and Humanities of the New University of Lisbon, from 1979.

Lopes died in Almada on 14 June 2025, at the age of 87.

== Awards ==
- 1987 – City of Lisbon Prize, for the work Os dedos, os dias, as palavras
- 1996 – Eça de Queiroz Poetry Prize, for the work Cicatriz
- 2001 – Grand Prize for Theatre of the Portuguese Association of Writers, for the work Esse tal Alguém
