= Sergey Mishin =

Russian kettlebell lifter (1958–2025)

- Сергей Мишин
- Born: Sergey Nikolayevich Mishin; 11 August 1958; Kaluga, Russian SFSR, USSR
- Died: 12 June 2025 (aged 66); Kaluga, Russia
- Known for: Kettlebell lifting

Sergey Nikolayevich Mishin (Russian: Сергей Николаевич Мишин; 11 August 1958 – 12 June 2025) was a Soviet and Russian sportsman, the first honored master of the sport of kettlebell lifting in the USSR.

== Biography ==
Born into a working-class family, Mishin lived in the city of Kaluga. Sport became engaged in 25 years.

At the professional level, he played from 1983 to 2006, from 2005 to 2008 and was head coach of Russian national teams.

Mishin died on 12 June 2025, at the age of 66.

== Achievements ==
- 21 — time champion of Russia
- 10 — time World Champion
- Champion X Summer Games of the Soviet peoples (1991)

== Awards ==
- Order For Merit to the Fatherland, 2nd class
