= Ray McVilly =

Australian rules footballer (1936–2025)

Personal information
- Full name: Raymond Douglas McVilly
- Born: 14 January 1936; Hobart
- Died: 25 June 2025 (aged 89); Wantirna, Victoria
- Original team: North Hobart
- Height: 179 cm (5 ft 10 in)
- Weight: 80 kg (176 lb)

Playing career^{1}
Years	Club	Games (Goals)
1958–60	Hawthorn	16 (0)
- ^{1} Playing statistics correct to the end of 1960.

Raymond Douglas McVilly (14 January 1936 – 25 June 2025) was an Australian rules footballer who played with Hawthorn in the Victorian Football League (VFL).
