= José Ornellas =

Brazilian politician (1921–2025)

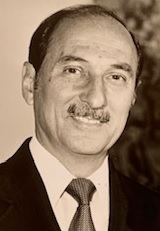

Governor of the Federal District
- In office 2 July 1982 – 8 April 1985
- Preceded by: Aimé Lamaison
- Succeeded by: Ronaldo Costa Couto

Member of the Legislative Chamber of the Federal District
- In office 1 February 1991 – 31 January 1995

Personal details
- Born: José Ornellas de Sousa Filho; 30 November 1921 Rio de Janeiro, Brazil
- Died: 28 June 2025 (aged 103) Rio de Janeiro, Brazil
- Party: Democratic Social Party; Liberal Party
- Education: Catholic University of Brasília
- Occupation: Military officer

José Ornellas de Sousa Filho (30 November 1921 – 28 June 2025) was a Brazilian politician. A member of the Democratic Social Party (PDS) and the Liberal Party (PL), he served as governor of the Federal District from 1982 to 1985 and was a member of the Legislative Chamber of the Federal District from 1991 to 1995.

Ornellas died in Rio de Janeiro on 28 June 2025, at the age of 103.
