= Kulsara Sulaymanova =

Kyrgyz politician (1930–2025)

- Кульсара Сулайманова

Member of the Soviet of Nationalities
- In office 2 August 1966 – 24 July 1974

Personal details
- Born: 1 January 1930; Kalinin District, Kirghiz ASSR, Russian SFSR, USSR
- Died: 12 June 2025 (aged 95)
- Political party: CPSU
- Occupation: Farmer

Kulsara Sulaymanova (Kyrgyz: Кульсара Сулайманова; 1 January 1930 – 12 June 2025) was a Kyrgyz politician. A member of the Communist Party of the Soviet Union, she served in the Soviet of Nationalities from 1966 to 1974.

Sulaymanova died on 12 June 2025, at the age of 95.
