= Mohammed Boujassoum =

Qatari actor (1948–2025)

- Born: 1948
- Died: 19 June 2025 (aged 77); Doha, Qatar
- Occupation: Actor

Mohammed Boujassoum (Arabic: محمد بوجسوم; 1948 – 19 June 2025) was a Qatari actor. He is considered one of the Qatari pioneers in the field of media in general and the field of theater, radio, and television in particular.

== Early life and education ==
Boujassoum studied at the Higher Institute of Theatrical Arts in Kuwait and the Academy of Arts, graduating in 1976. He became the first Qatari to earn a bachelor's degree in the region.

== Career ==
Boujassoum began in theatrical acting during the 1960s through acting sketches, in which he participated in scout camps. In 1968, when Qatar Radio was opened, he participated alongside fellow members of the lights band in the early radio dramas, where he participated with director Ismail Khaled Al-Abbasi in starring in the first Qatari radio series broadcast on radio in that period, titled The Boutahnoun Family. He also participated in the early Qatari television dramas in the early 1970s, which were presented by the musical lights band for Qatar Television, including I am the mistaken, The family of Boushlakh, both directed by Ahmed Al-Toukhi. He was appointed the General Manager of the Qatar National Theatre in November 1981. He also wrote for Qatari newspapers, compiling his writings into a book prior to his death. In 2023, Boujassoum was honoured by Sheikh Abdulrahman bin Hamad bin Jassim bin Hamad Al Thani at the Doha Theater Festival in appreciation for "great artistic and pioneering careers in the world of theater".

== Death ==
Boujassoum died on 19 June 2025, at the age of 77.
