= Fernando Lázaro Fernández =

Spanish journalist (1966–2025)

Fernando Lázaro Fernández (15 April 1966 – 14 June 2025) was a Spanish journalist and university professor, specialising in investigative journalism, and focused on security, terrorism, and defense.

== Life and career ==
Lázaro was born on 15 April 1966 in Logroño. After graduating from the Faculty of Communication at the University of Navarra, he began his journalistic career at the Logroño newspaper Diario de la Rioja, and at the Madrid newspaper Diario 16.

Subsequently, together with other journalists, he participated in the founding of the newspaper El Mundo, where he became editor-in-chief, and worked on several major stories: on the case of the tip-off to the separatist group ETA during the government of José Luis Rodríguez Zapatero, the GAL and the investigation into Lasa and Zabala, the flight of politician Jordi Pujol and his family to Andorra, and the COVID-19 pandemic in Madrid.

He was also a regular radio collaborator in various media. including: EsRadio, Televisión Española, Telemadrid, and Radio Nacional de España.

Lázaro died in Madrid on 14 June 2025, as a result of MALT lymphoma, with which he had been diagnosed in 1999. He was 59.
