= Giacomo Tamburelli =

Panamanian businessman (died 2025)

Giacomo Tamburelli (died 21 June 2025) was a Panamanian businessman.

== Career ==
Tamburelli was the director of the National Aid Program (PAN), a public-school nutrition program.

== Corruption scandal ==
In 2015, Tamburelli, alongside a number of officials, including Ricardo Martinelli, was under investigation for alleged corruption. In January 2025, Tamburelli was ordered to serve a 48-month prison sentence.

== Death ==
Tamburelli died in prison on 21 June 2025.
