= Neil J. Miller =

American politician (1929–2025)

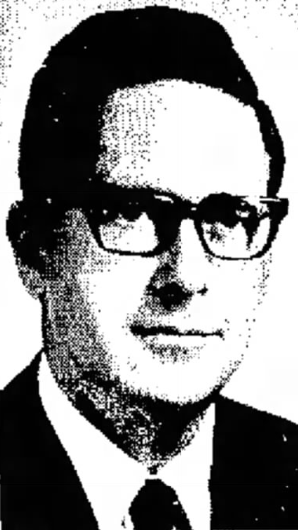
- Miller in 1970

Member of the Idaho House of Representatives
- In office 1967–1970

Member of the Idaho Senate
- In office 1971–1972

Personal details
- Born: Neil Jay Miller; October 28, 1929 Blackfoot, Idaho, U.S.
- Died: June 13, 2025 (aged 95) Blackfoot, Idaho, U.S.
- Party: Democratic
- Education: Utah State University; Idaho State University

Neil Jay Miller (October 28, 1929 – June 13, 2025) was an American politician. A member of the Democratic Party, he served in the Idaho House of Representatives from 1967 to 1970 and in the Idaho Senate from 1971 to 1972.

== Life and career ==
Miller was born in Blackfoot, Idaho, the son of Earl Miller and Nora Marlow. He attended and graduated from Blackfoot High School. After graduating, he attended Utah State University, studying business administration. He also attended Idaho State University.

Miller served in the Idaho House of Representatives from 1967 to 1970. After his service in the House, he then served in the Idaho Senate from 1971 to 1972.

In 2011, Miller was inducted into the Idaho Agriculture Hall of Fame.

== Death ==
Miller died in Blackfoot, Idaho on June 13, 2025, at the age of 95.
