= Arthur Cunha Lima =

Brazilian politician (1949–2025)

Member of the Legislative Assembly of Paraíba
- In office 1 February 1999 – 4 May 2010

Personal details
- Born: Arthur Paredes Cunha Lima; 19 December 1949; Campina Grande, Paraíba, Brazil
- Died: 9 June 2025 (aged 75); João Pessoa, Paraíba, Brazil
- Political party: PMDB; PSDB
- Education: Federal University of Rio Grande do Norte
- Occupation: Lawyer

Arthur Paredes Cunha Lima (19 December 1949 – 9 June 2025) was a Brazilian politician. A member of the Brazilian Democratic Movement Party and the Brazilian Social Democracy Party, he served in the Legislative Assembly of Paraíba from 1999 to 2010.

Lima died from multiple organ failure in João Pessoa, on 9 June 2025, at the age of 75.
