= Edward J. Heinz =

United States Air Force general

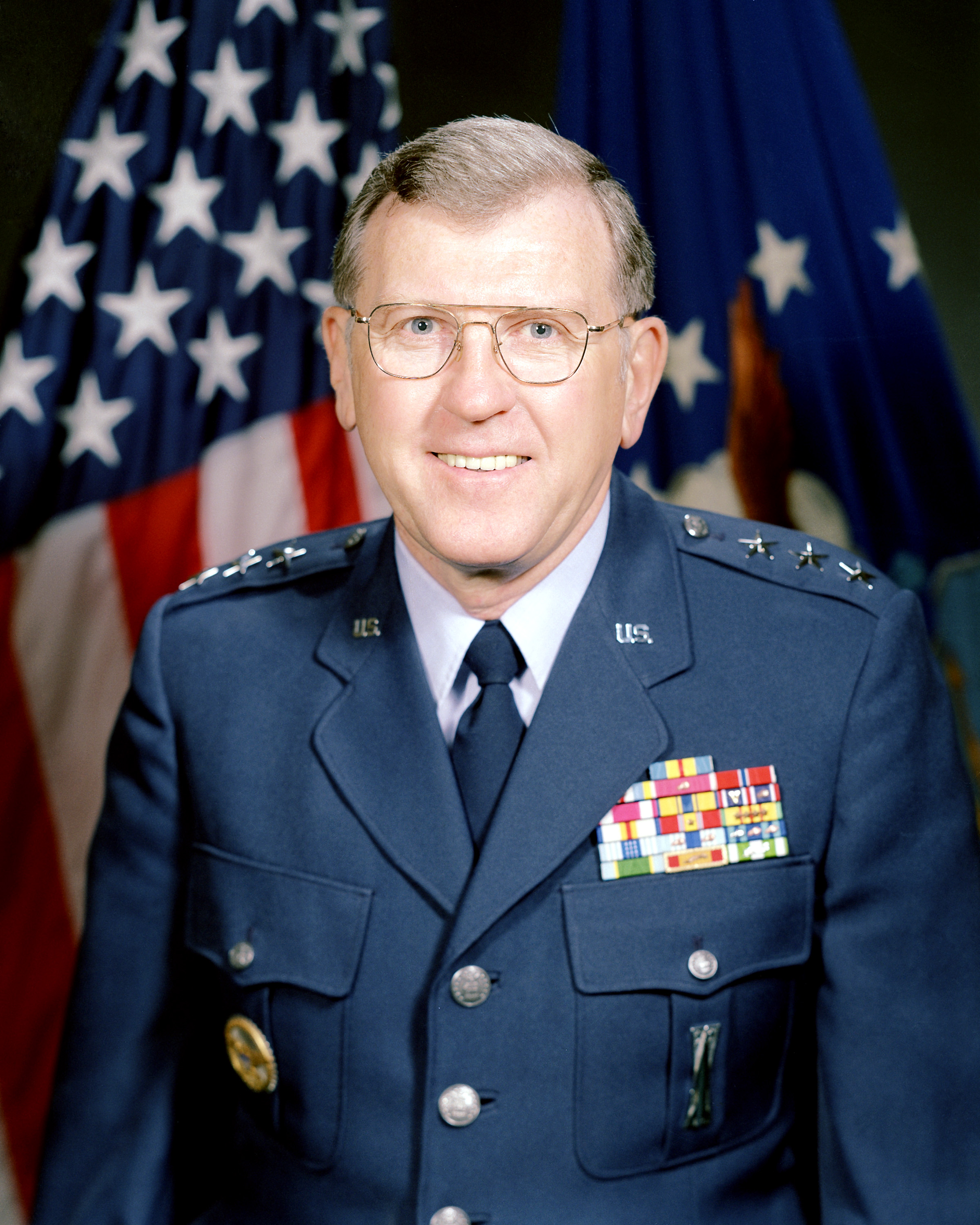
- Born: August 30, 1932; Hastings, Minnesota U.S.
- Died: June 23, 2025 (aged 92); Sterling, Virginia U.S.
- Military career
- Allegiance: United States
- Branch: United States Air Force
- Service years: 1954–1990
- Rank: Lieutenant general
- Commands: Director, Intelligence Community Staff; Director of Intelligence, U.S. European Command

Edward John Heinz (August 30, 1932 – June 23, 2025) was a lieutenant general in the United States Air Force who served as director of the intelligence community staff from 1986 to 1990. He was commissioned through ROTC at the University of Minnesota in 1954.

General Heinz was born in 1932, in Hastings, Minn., where he completed high school in 1950. He earned a bachelor of arts degree in economics and geography from the University of Minnesota in 1954 and a master's degree in public administration from Auburn University in 1974. The general completed Squadron Officer School in 1961, Air Command and Staff College in 1966 and the Air War College in 1974.

He completed Reserve Officer Training Corps requirements at the University of Minnesota and was commissioned as a second lieutenant in the Air Force Reserve. He was called to active duty at Reese Air Force Base, Texas, where he was assigned as school secretary for the 3500th Pilot Training Wing.

The general entered photo radar intelligence training in March 1957 and upon completion was assigned to the 67th Reconnaissance Technical Squadron, Yokota Air Base, Japan. He subsequently was assigned to Headquarters 5th Air Force, Fuchu Air Station, Japan, as chief of the Special Reconnaissance Section in the Directorate of Intelligence. Upon his return to the United States in October 1960, General Heinz was assigned to Headquarters Tactical Air Command at Langley Air Force Base, Va., as staff photo interpreter until August 1965.

Upon graduation from Air Command and Staff College in June 1966, General Heinz was assigned to the North Atlantic Treaty Organization's 6th Allied Tactical Air Force at Izmir, Turkey, as an air targets officer and reconnaissance adviser until September 1968. He then served as operations officer for the 12th Reconnaissance Intelligence Technical Squadron, Tan Son Nhut Air Base, Republic of Vietnam. In October 1969 he transferred to the Office of the Assistant Chief of Staff, Intelligence, Headquarters U.S. Air Force, Washington, D.C., as a plans officer. He subsequently served as deputy assistant for joint matters until June 1973.

After graduating from the Air War College in July 1974, he returned to Air Force headquarters as chief of the Imagery Branch. From April 1976 to July 1977 the general served as executive and military assistant to the assistant secretary of defense for command, control, communications and intelligence. He subsequently commanded the 544th Aerospace Reconnaissance Technical Wing, Offutt Air Force Base, Neb. General Heinz became assistant deputy chief of staff for intelligence at Strategic Air Command headquarters, also at Offutt Air Force Base, in February 1979.

The general transferred to Peterson Air Force Base, Colo., in August 1979 and served as deputy chief of staff for intelligence at North American Aerospace Defense Command and U.S. Aerospace Defense Command. In January 1982 he became director of intelligence, Headquarters U.S. European Command, Stuttgart, West Germany. He assumed his present duties in September 1986.

His military decorations and awards include the Defense Distinguished Service Medal, Defense Superior Service Medal with oak leaf cluster, Legion of Merit with oak leaf cluster, Bronze Star Medal, Meritorious Service Medal, Air Force Commendation Medal, Air Force Outstanding Unit Award with "V" device and oak leaf cluster, National Intelligence Distinguished Service Medal, National Defense Service Medal with service star, Vietnam Service Medal with four service stars, Air Force Overseas Ribbon-Short, Air Force Overseas Ribbon-Long with two oak leaf clusters, Air Force Longevity Service Award Ribbon with seven oak leaf clusters, Small Arms Expert Marksmanship Ribbon, Republic of Vietnam Gallantry Cross with Palm and Republic of Vietnam Campaign Medal.

He was promoted to lieutenant general Sept. 19, 1986, with same date of rank. Heinz died on June 23, 2025, in Sterling, Virginia.
