= Mikhail Maslin =

Russian historian (1947–2025)

- Михаил Маслин
- Born: 16 July 1947; Moscow, Russian SFSR, USSR
- Died: 20 June 2025 (aged 77)
- Citizenship: Russian
- Education: Moscow State University
- Scientific career
- Fields: History of philosophy, Russian philosophy
- Workplaces: Moscow State University
- Thesis: The Ideology of the Narodniks (1974)
- Doctoral advisor: Ivan Shchipanov

Mikhail Alexandrovich Maslin (Russian: Михаил Александрович Маслин; 16 July 1947 – 20 June 2025) was a Russian historian of philosophy and Distinguished Professor at the Lomonosov Moscow State University (2001), where he held the chair of Russian Philosophy (from 1992). He was a member of the Russian Philosophical Society since 1973 and served on the editorial boards of Philosophy of Economy, Philosophy and Education, and Philosophy and Society. Prof. Maslin published over 80 scientific works, including a number of monographs and textbooks. Maslin died on 20 June 2025, at the age of 77.

== Selected publications ==
- (in Russian) Маслин М. А., book review of Anna Crone's Eros and Creativity in Russian Religious Renewal (The Bulletin of Saint Tikhon's Orthodox University). « Серия 1: Богословие. Философия. Религиоведение», выпуск 2 (34). 2011

== Bibliography ==
- Маслин, Михаил Александрович // Большая русская биографическая энциклопедия (электронное издание). — Версия 3.0. — М.: Бизнессофт, ИДДК, 2007. // Алексеев П. В. Философы России XIX—XX столетий. Биографии, идеи, труды. — 4-е изд., перераб. и доп. — М.: Академический проект, 2002. — 1152 с. ISBN 5-8291-0148-3
