= Vladimír Vonka =

Czech virologist (1930–2025)

Vladimír Vonka (31 July 1930 – 20 June 2025) was a Czech virologist. He worked in the field of anticarcinogen vaccines.

== Life and career ==
Vonka was born on 31 July 1930 in Prague, Czechoslovakia. In 1947, he graduated from the Vančura Grammar School in Prague-Smíchov. He then graduated from the Faculty of Medicine of Charles University.

Together with gynaecologist Jiří Kaňka in the 1970s and 1980s, he led a study that contributed to the identification of the viral causative agent of cervical cancer, which then enabled the development of the appropriate vaccine.

He was one of the founding members of the Learned Society of the Czech Republic, established in 1994. In 2005, he received the Medal of Merit in the field of science from President Václav Klaus. He was also a member of the European Academy of Sciences and Arts.

Vonka died on 20 June 2025, at the age of 94.
