= Noh Tae-geuk =

South Korean politician (1938–2025)

- 노태극

Member of the National Assembly of South Korea
- In office 11 April 1981 – 10 April 1985
- Constituency: Miryang-gun and Changnyeong-gun

Personal details
- Born: 2 June 1938
- Died: 9 June 2025 (aged 87); Seoul, South Korea
- Political party: Independent
- Education: Gyeongnam National University of Science and Technology; Seoul National University
- Occupation: Farmer

Noh Tae-geuk (Korean: 노태극; 2 June 1938 – 9 June 2025) was a South Korean politician. An independent, he served in the National Assembly from 1981 to 1985.

Noh died in Seoul on 9 June 2025, at the age of 87.
