= Knut Solem =

Norwegian diplomat

Knut Solem (30 July 1946 - 11 June 2025) was a Norwegian diplomat.

He took the cand.mag. degree and started working for the Norwegian Ministry of Foreign Affairs in 1976. He served as Norway's consul-general in Rio de Janeiro from 1989 to 1994, Norway's ambassador to the United Arab Emirates from 1994 to 1996 and to Singapore from 1996 to 1999. From 1996 to 2004 he was special adviser and head of department in the Ministry of Foreign Affairs. He was ambassador to Mexico from 2005 to 2009 and to the Philippines from 2009 to 2014.
