= Detlef Gruber =

Austrian politician (1952–2025)

Member of the Landtag of Styria
- In office 15 October 2000 – 31 May 2015

Personal details
- Born: 15 December 1952; Scheifling, Styria, Austria
- Died: 15 June 2025 (aged 72)
- Political party: SPÖ
- Occupation: School administrator and politician

Detlef Gruber (15 December 1952 – 15 June 2025) was an Austrian school administrator and politician. He was a member of the Social Democratic Party and served in the Landtag of Styria from 2000 to 2015.

Gruber died on 15 June 2025, at the age of 72.
