= Gregg Lee Carter =

American sociologist (1951–2025)

Gregg Lee Carter (July 15, 1951 – June 17, 2025) was an American sociologist and professor emeritus of sociology at Bryant University in Smithfield, Rhode Island. His research focused on gun violence, human ecology, and gender roles, among other subjects. He was educated at the University of Nevada, Las Vegas (B.A. in history and psychology) and Columbia University (M.A., M.Phil., and Ph.D. in sociology). He wrote or edited 26 books, including the three-volume series Guns in American Society: An Encyclopedia of History, Politics, Culture, and the Law. He was the president of the New England Sociological Association, and received their "Sociologist of the Year Award", as well as the "Outstanding Contributions to Instruction Award" from the American Sociological Association's Section on Communication, Information Technologies and Media Sociology.

Carter was born on July 15, 1951, and died June 17, 2025, at the age of 73.
