= Jan Vranken =

Dutch academic (1948–2025)

Johannes Bernardus Marie "Jan" Vranken (1948 – 17 June 2025) was a Dutch academic who was a professor in the Private Law Department of Tilburg University, The Netherlands.

== Life and career ==
Vranken was born in 1948. He specialised in Civil Law, Civil Procedure, Jurisprudence and Methodology in private law on which subjects he published extensively. He received an honorary doctorate from Leiden University and built his reputation as a distinguished practician and theoretician in civil law as Advocate General at the Supreme Court of the Netherlands. He was appointed Director of Schoordijk Institute of Tilburg University (Research School for Legislative Studies). In addition, he was awarded the Royal Honour in the order of the Dutch Lion.

He was elected a member of the Royal Netherlands Academy of Arts and Sciences in 1993.

Vranken died on 17 June 2025, at the age of 77.
