= Azim Latipov =

Uzbek politician (1951–2025)

Member of the Senate of Uzbekistan
- In office 2004–2019

Personal details
- Born: Azim Shukurovich Latipov; 5 June 1951; Shofirkon District, Uzbek SSR, USSR
- Died: 6 June 2025 (aged 74); Shofirkon District, Uzbekistan
- Political party: Independent
- Occupation: Farmer

Azim Shukurovich Latipov (5 June 1951 – 6 June 2025) was an Uzbek politician. An independent, he served in the Senate from 2004 to 2019.

Latipov died on Shofirkon District on 6 June 2025, at the age of 74.
