= Michel Schifres =

French journalist (1946–2025)

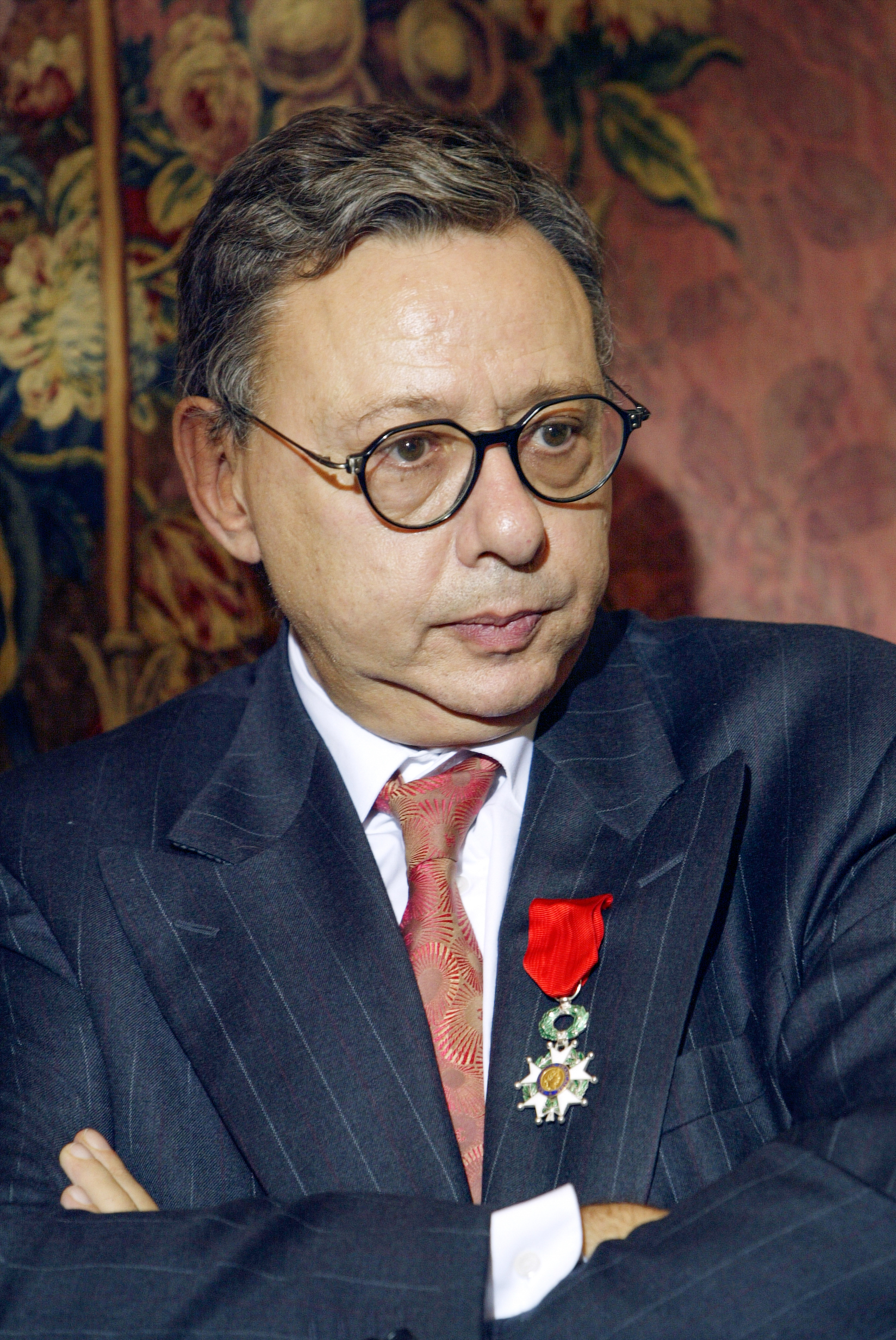
- Schifres in 2004
- Born: 1 May 1946; Orléans, France
- Died: 5 June 2025 (aged 79); Paris, France
- Education: Centre de formation des journalistes
- Occupation: Journalist • Writer
- Employer: Le Figaro
- Children: 2

Michel Schifres (1 May 1946 – 5 June 2025) was a French journalist.

After his studies at the Centre de formation des journalistes, he worked as an editor at Combat, Le Monde, and Le Quotidien de Paris. From 1998 to 2000, he was managing editor at Le Figaro. He was the father of photojournalist Lucas Schifres, residing in Hong Kong.

Schifres died in Paris on 5 June 2025, at the age of 79.
