= Scylla Duarte Prata =

Brazilian gynecologist (1923–2025)

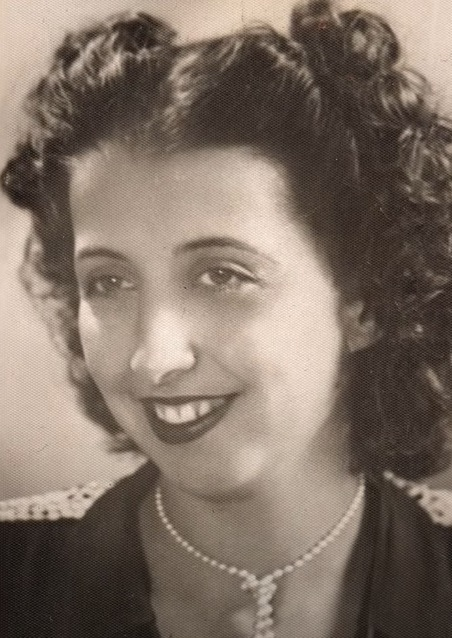
Scylla Duarte Prata c. 1940s

Scylla Duarte Prata (Sacramento, Minas Gerais, November 23, 1923 – Barretos, June 14, 2025) was a Brazilian gynecologist.

== Life and career ==
Prata entered the Faculty of Medicine of the University of São Paulo (USP) at a time when very few women were seen in the corridors of medical teaching institutions, graduating in 1949.

After graduation, Dr. Prata married Dr. Paulo Prata, dedicating herself to medical practice and the development of health services in Barretos, São Paulo. Together, they founded the São Judas Tadeu Hospital, which later evolved into the Hospital de Amor, under the administration of the Pius XII Foundation, established in 1967. She was instrumental in the introduction and dissemination of the Pap smear in Barretos, a technique that revolutionized the early diagnosis of cervical cancer. Her commitment to preventive medicine saved countless lives and set new standards of medical care for women across the region.

Prata died on June 14, 2025, at the age of 101.
