= Clark Platon =

Brazilian politician (1930–2025)

Member of the Chamber of Deputies of Brazil for Amapá
- In office 1 February 1983 – 31 January 1987

Personal details
- Born: Clark Charles Platon; 24 October 1930; Santarém, Pará, Brazil
- Died: 4 June 2025 (aged 94); Belém, Pará, Brazil
- Political party: ARENA (1972–1979); PDS (1980–1986); PMDB (1986–1990); PTB (1990)
- Education: Federal University of Pará
- Occupation: Civil engineer

Clark Charles Platon (24 October 1930 – 4 June 2025) was a Brazilian politician. A member of the Democratic Social Party and the Brazilian Democratic Movement Party, he served in the Chamber of Deputies from 1983 to 1987.

Platon died in Belém on 4 June 2024, at the age of 94.
