= Rod Nordland =

American journalist (1949–2025)

Rod Nordland (July 17, 1949 – June 18, 2025) was an American journalist and writer. He was a war correspondent for Newsweek, The New York Times and The Philadelphia Inquirer. Nordland was born in Philadelphia, Pennsylvania on July 17, 1949. He died from glioblastoma at his home in Manhattan on June 18, 2025, at the age of 75. Nordland had been initially diagnosed with the cancer in 2019.
