= Marek Oleksiński =

Polish politician (1941–2025)

Voivode of Nowy Sącz
- In office 1996–1997
- Preceded by: Wiktor Sowa
- Succeeded by: Lucjan Tabaka

Personal details
- Born: Marek Wiesław Oleksiński; 27 March 1941; Rudnik, General Government
- Died: 2 June 2025 (aged 84)
- Political party: SdRP
- Education: Wrocław University of Science and Technology
- Occupation: Civil engineer

Marek Wiesław Oleksiński (27 March 1941 – 2 June 2025) was a Polish politician. A member of Social Democracy of the Republic of Poland, he served as voivode of Nowy Sącz from 1996 to 1997.

Oleksiński died on 2 June 2025, at the age of 84.
