= Zamathembu Ngcobo =

South African politician (1979–2025)

Permanent Delegate to the National Council of Provinces from KwaZulu-Natal
- In office 15 June 2024 – 21 June 2025

Personal details
- Born: 4 May 1979
- Died: 21 June 2025 (aged 46)
- Party: uMkhonto weSizwe

Zamathembu Nokuthula Ngcobo (4 May 1979 – 21 June 2025) was a South African politician who represented KwaZulu-Natal in the National Council of Provinces as a member of the uMkhonto weSizwe from 2024 until her death in 2025.

== Parliamentary career ==
Following the 2024 general election, Ngcobo was elected as one of three uMkhonto weSizwe permanent delegates to the National Council of Provinces from KwaZulu-Natal.

Ngcobo was a member of the Select Committee on Social Services and the Select Committee on Education, Sciences and Creative Industries.

== Personal life and death ==
Ngcobo was born on 4 May 1979. She died following a short illness on 21 June 2025 at the age of 46. Parliament's presiding officers and the MK Party spokesperson expressed their condolences.
