= Piero Testoni =

Italian politician (1951–2025)

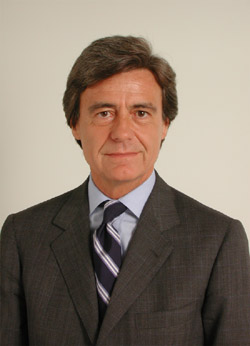
- Testoni in 2001

Member of the Chamber of Deputies
- In office 30 May 2001 – 14 March 2013
- Constituency: Lazio 1 (2001–2006); Lombardy 2 (2006–2008); Sardinia (2008–2013)

Personal details
- Born: 22 December 1951; Sassari, Italy
- Died: 4 June 2025 (aged 73); Sassari, Italy
- Political party: FI; PdL
- Education: Università Cattolica del Sacro Cuore
- Occupation: Journalist

Piero Testoni (22 December 1951 – 4 June 2025) was an Italian politician. A member of Forza Italia and The People of Freedom, he served in the Chamber of Deputies from 2001 to 2013.

Testoni died in Sassari on 4 June 2025, at the age of 73.
