= Stanislav Šárský =

Czech actor (1939–2025)

Stanislav Šárský (11 October 1939 – 20 June 2025) was a Czech actor.

== Life and career ==
Šárský was born on 11 October 1939 in Prague. After graduating from high school, he unsuccessfully applied to the Academy of Performing Arts in Prague, where he joined after completing his military service.

He settled permanently in Ostrava and performed in Prague theatre companies from 1993 onwards.

From 2003, he was engaged at the Švanda Theatre in Smíchov. From the 2013–2014 season, he was engaged at the Moravian Theatre in Olomouc. In 2023, he received the Thalia Award for lifelong mastery in drama.

In addition to theatre, he acted in several episodes of the series Bakaláři, and played coach Hrouzek in the comedy series The Line.

Šárský died on 20 June 2025, at the age of 85.
