= Patricio Flores Sandoval =

Mexican politician and trade union leader (1951–2025)

- Born: 1 September 1951; Guadalajara, Jalisco, Mexico
- Died: 18 June 2025 (aged 73); Mexico City, Mexico
- Occupations: Deputy, union leader
- Political party: PRI

Patricio Flores Sandoval (Spanish: [paˈtɾisjo ˈfloɾes sandoˈβal]; 1 September 1951 – 18 June 2025) was a Mexican politician, broadcaster and labor leader who was affiliated with the PRI. He served as Deputy of both the LX and LXII Legislatures of the Mexican Congress, representing Jalisco, and as the director general of the Sindicato Industrial de Trabajadores y Artistas de Televisión y Radio (SITATYR) labor union from 2000 to 2025. He died on 18 June 2025, at the age of 73.
