= Ulrica Schenström =

Swedish politician (1972–2025)

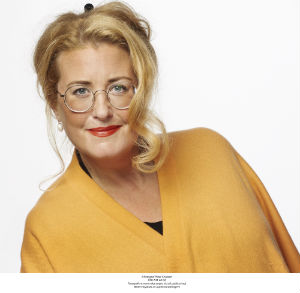
- Schenström in 2014.

Secretary of state
- In office 2006–2007

Personal details
- Born: 30 June 1972; Vaxholm, Sweden
- Died: 9 June 2025 (aged 52); Stockholm, Sweden
- Political party: Moderate Party

Ewa Ulrica Schenström (30 June 1972 – 9 June 2025) was a Swedish politician and a member of the Moderate Party. She was Secretary of state to the Prime Minister in the Cabinet of Fredrik Reinfeldt (2006–2007). Schenström resigned from her position after she was photographed in a restaurant embracing and kissing a political journalist from TV4. She was born on 30 June 1972, and died on 9 June 2025, at the age of 52.
