= Malachi F. Anderson =

American politician (1931–2025)

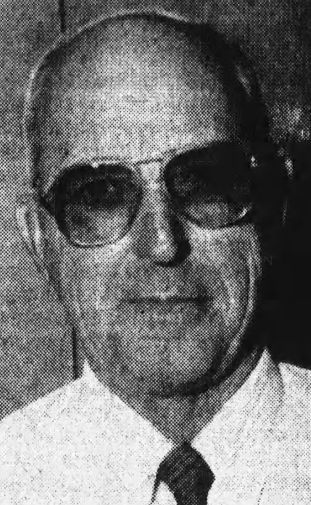
- Anderson in 1988

Member of the Maine House of Representatives
- In office 1987–1995

Personal details
- Born: Malachi Colby Anderson; November 2, 1931 Woodland, Maine, U.S.
- Died: June 18, 2025 (aged 93) Presque Isle, Maine, U.S.
- Party: Republican

Malachi Colby Anderson (November 2, 1931 – June 18, 2025) was an American politician. A member of the Republican Party, he served in the Maine House of Representatives from 1987 to 1995.

== Life and career ==
Anderson was born in Woodland, Maine, the son of Marvin Anderson and Dolly Brown. He attended and graduated from Caribou High School. After graduating, he served in the armed forces during the Korean War, which after his discharge, he worked as a potato grower.

Anderson served in the Maine House of Representatives from 1987 to 1995. He lost his seat in the House, in 1994, when he ran as a Republican candidate for Maine state senator from the 1st district. He received 4,997 votes, but lost to Democratic incumbent Judy Paradis, who won with 8,493 votes.

Anderson died at the Aroostook House of Comfort in Presque Isle, Maine, on June 18, 2025, at the age of 93.
