= Jane Lazarre =

American author (1943 or 1944 – 2025)

Jane Lazarre (1943 or 1944 – June 19, 2025) was an American author. She died on June 19, 2025, at the age of 81.

== Books ==
- Beyond the Whiteness of Whiteness: Memoir of a White Mother of Black Sons (1996) (ISBN 0822361477)
- Breaking Light (2021) (ISBN 9780990376781)
- The Mother Knot (1976) (ISBN 0822320398)
- Wet Earth and Dreams (1998) (ISBN 9780822378174)
- The Communist and the Communist's Daughter (2017) (ISBN 978-0822372387)
