= Rafael Samudio =

Colombian military officer and politician (1932–2025)

Minister of National Defense
- In office 7 August 1986 – 7 August 1988
- Preceded by: Miguel Vega Uribe
- Succeeded by: Manuel Jaime Guerrero Paz

Personal details
- Born: Rafael Samudio Molina; 3 January 1932
- Died: 11 June 2025 (aged 93); Bogotá, Colombia
- Education: School of the Americas
- Occupation: Military officer

Rafael Samudio Molina (3 January 1932 – 11 June 2025) was a Colombian military officer and politician. He served as Minister of National Defense from 1986 to 1988.

Samudio was one of the leaders of the retake of the Palace of Justice after the siege by 19th of April Movement in 1989.

Samudio died in Bogotá on 11 June 2025, at the age of 93.
