= Lee Jeong-moo =

South Korean politician (1941–2025)

- 이정무

Minister of Transport and Construction
- In office 3 March 1998 – 24 May 1999
- Preceded by: Lee Hwan-gyun
- Succeeded by: Lee Geon-chun

Member of the National Assembly of South Korea for Nam-gu
- In office 30 May 1996 – 29 May 2000
- In office 30 May 1988 – 29 May 1992

Personal details
- Born: 9 April 1941 Uiseong County, Korea, Empire of Japan
- Died: 21 June 2025 (aged 84)
- Party: DJP; ULD
- Education: Seoul National University; Yeungnam University
- Occupation: Businessman and politician

Lee Jeong-moo (Korean: 이정무; 9 April 1941 – 21 June 2025) was a South Korean businessman and politician who was a member of the Democratic Justice Party and the United Liberal Democrats, he served as Minister of Transport and Construction from 1998 to 1999 and was a member of the National Assembly from 1988 to 1992 and again from 1996 to 2000.

Lee died on 21 June 2025, at the age of 84.
