= Jesús Zueco Ruiz =

Spanish lawyer and politician (1946–2025)

Jesús Zueco Ruiz (10 March 1946 – 18 June 2025) was a Spanish lawyer and politician.

== Life and career ==
Jesús Zueco was born in Zaragoza, Aragon on 10 March 1946. After graduating in Law from the University of Zaragoza, he became a State Lawyer, and later founded his own law firm Ruiz Soriano-Zueco Abogados. He combined his legal career with teaching, being an associate professor at the National University of Distance Education (UNED) and as a professor at the School of Legal Practice of the University of La Rioja.

In 1983, he was a regional deputy in the Parliament of La Rioja, for the People's Alliance in the First Legislature (1983–1987); and by the People's Party in the II Legislature (1987–1991). He was secretary general of the Popular Party and a member of the Consultative Council of La Rioja. He was also a member-arbitrator of the Civil and Commercial Court of Arbitration (CIMA).

Zueco Ruiz died at the San Pedro Hospital in Logroño, on 18 June 2025, at the age of 79.

The Parliament of La Rioja paid tribute to him on 19 June 2025, with a minute of silence in his memory and the interventions of the different political groups represented in the Rioja chamber.
