= Francesco Marenco =

Italian politician (1939–2025)

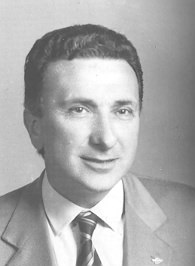
- Marenco in 1992

Member of the Chamber of Deputies of Italy for Liguria
- In office 23 April 1992 – 8 May 1996

Personal details
- Born: Francesco Marenco; 16 November 1939 Genoa, Italy
- Died: 18 June 2025 (aged 85)
- Political party: AN

Francesco Marenco (16 November 1939 – 18 June 2025) was an Italian politician who was a member of the National Alliance, he served in the Chamber of Deputies from 1992 to 1996.

Marenco died on 18 June 2025, at the age of 85.
