= Thai Life Insurance =

Insurance company in Thailand

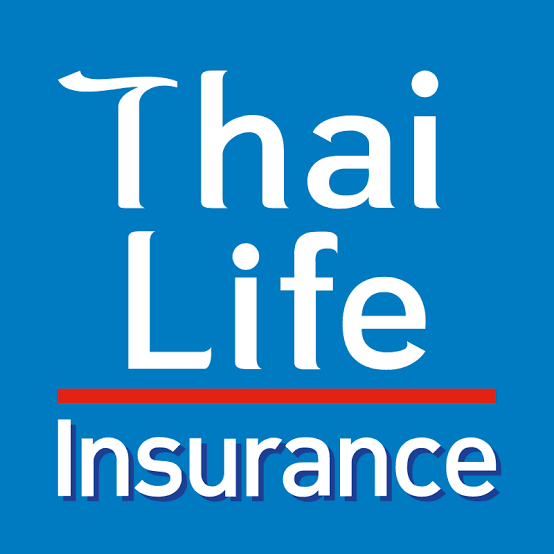
- Type: Public company limited
- ISIN: THA848010007
- Industry: Insurance; Financial services
- Founded: 1942; 84 years ago
- Founder: Chao Phraya Sri Thammathibet
- Headquarters: Bangkok, Thailand
- Key people: Vacant (Chairman)
- Revenue: ▲US$2 billion (2014) ▲US$2.1 billion (2015)▲US$3.28 billion (2018)
- Net income: ▲US$138.8 million (2014) US$142.3 million (2015)US$217 million (2018)
- Total assets: ▲US$7.3 billion (2014) US$8.2 billion (2015) ▲US$9.2 billion (2016) ▲US$10.6 billion (2017) ▲US$14 billion (2018)
- Members: over 1,500,000 (2016)
- Number of employees: 45000
- Subsidiaries: Thai Phaiboon Insurance; Thai Health Insurance; Thai Cardif Life Assurance; Thai Credit Retail Bank
- Website: www.thailife.com

Thai Life Insurance Public Co. Ltd or simply Thai Life Insurance (Thai: บริษัท ไทยประกันชีวิต จำกัด (มหาชน)) is the first Thai insurance company. The company was founded in 1942 and is headquartered in Bangkok, Thailand. It was one of the largest insurance companies in Thailand.

Today, it is a financial services group in Thailand with the slogan Thai Life Insurance. Life Beside You.

The Chaiyawan Family sold a 15% stake for around $750 million to Meiji Yasuda Life Insurance in 2013.

The company is known for commissioning a number of emotional television commercials that have garnered global attention.
