= Richard R. Eakin =

American academic administrator (1938–2025)

Richard Ronald Eakin (August 6, 1938 – June 2, 2025) was an American academic administrator who was the eighth chancellor of East Carolina University.

== Life and career ==
Eakin was born in New Castle, Pennsylvania on August 6, 1938, and earned his bachelor's degree in mathematics and physics, summa cum laude, from Geneva College. He earned his master's and doctorate degree in mathematics from Washington State University in 1962 and 1964. Eakin started his career on the mathematics faculty at Bowling Green State University. He was named chancellor in 1987.

Eakin died on June 2, 2025, at the age of 86.
