= Jim Masselos =

Australian social historian (1940–2025)

James Cosmas Masselos (1940–2025) was an Australian social historian focused on contemporary India, especially Bombay/Mumbai. He attended Sydney Boys High School and the University of Sydney, where Marjorie Jacobs was among his teachers. He went on to study at Bombay University under William Coelho.

He taught at the University of Sydney from 1961 to 2005 and was a Fellow of the Australian Academy of the Humanities and (rare among foreigners) The Asiatic Society of Mumbai.
