= Heidemarie Unterreiner =

Austrian politician (1944–2025)

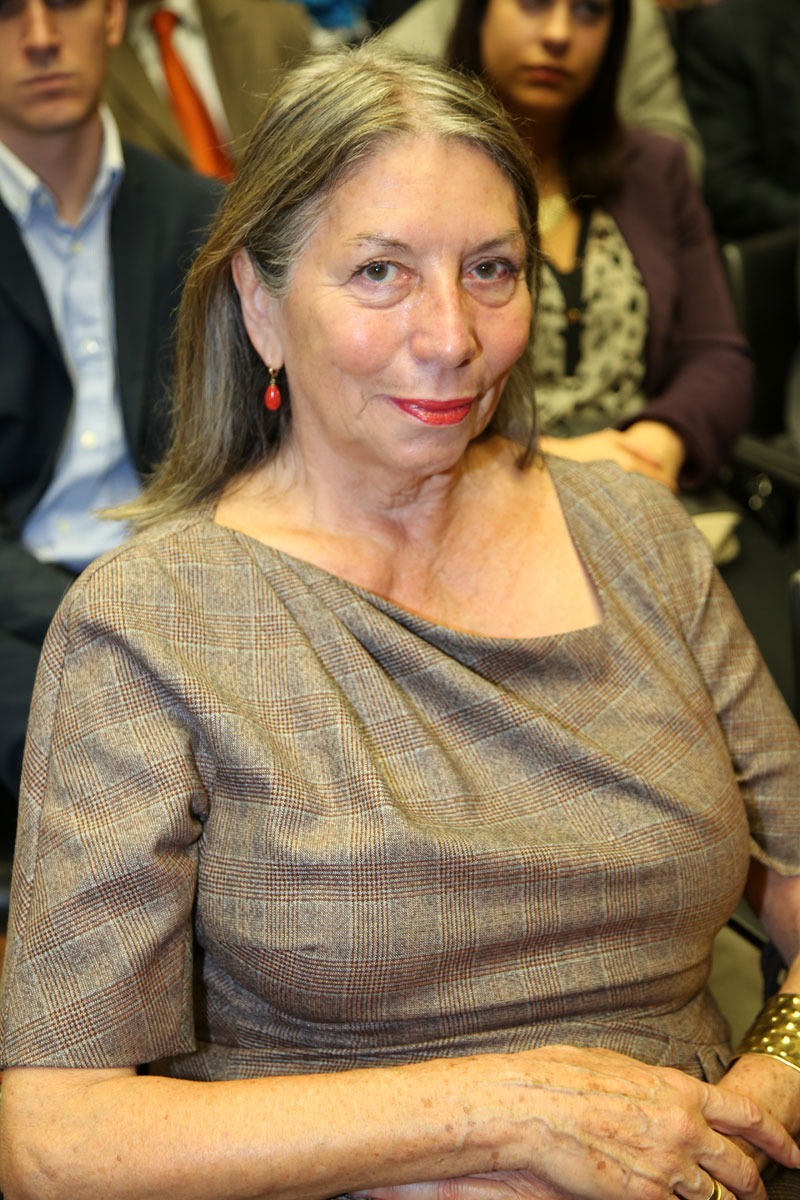
- Unterreiner in 2013

Member of the National Council of Austria
- In office 28 October 2008 – 20 October 2013

Personal details
- Born: 24 February 1944; Tübingen, Gau Württemberg-Hohenzollern, Germany
- Died: 1 June 2025 (aged 81); Vienna, Austria
- Political party: FPÖ
- Education: University of Graz

Heidemarie Unterreiner (24 February 1944 – 1 June 2025) was an Austrian politician. A member of the Freedom Party, she served in the National Council from 2008 to 2013.

Unterreiner died in Vienna on 1 June 2025, at the age of 81.
