= Monarchy of Ireland =

Historical method of government in Ireland

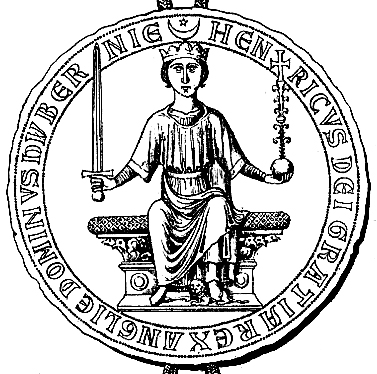
Seal of Henry III, with text Dominus Hybernie, "Lord of Ireland."

Badge of the Kingdom of Ireland.

Monarchical systems of government have existed in Ireland from ancient times. This continued in all of Ireland until 1949, when the Republic of Ireland Act removed most of Ireland's residual ties to the British monarch. Northern Ireland, as part of the United Kingdom, remains under a monarchical system of government.

The office of High King of Ireland effectively ended with the Anglo-Norman invasion of Ireland (1169–1171) in which the island was declared a fief of the Holy See under the Lordship of the King of England. In practice, conquered territory was divided amongst various Anglo-Norman noble families who assumed title over both the land and the people with the prior Irish inhabitants being either displaced or subjugated under the previously alien system of serfdom. Though the revolutionary change in the status quo was undeniable, the Anglo-Norman invaders would fail to conquer many of the Gaelic kingdoms of Ireland, which continued to exist, often expanding for centuries after, however none could make any viable claims of High Kingship. This lasted until the Parliament of Ireland conferred the crown of Ireland upon King Henry VIII of England during the English Reformation. Henry initiated the Tudor conquest of Ireland which ended Gaelic political independence from the English monarch who now held the crowns of England and Ireland in a personal union.

The Union of the Crowns in 1603 expanded the personal union to include Scotland. The personal union between England and Scotland became a political union with the enactments of the Acts of Union 1707, which created the Kingdom of Great Britain. The crowns of Great Britain and Ireland remained in personal union until it was also ended by the Acts of Union 1800, which united Ireland and Great Britain into the United Kingdom of Great Britain and Ireland in January 1801.

In December 1922, most of Ireland seceded from the United Kingdom, becoming the Irish Free State; at the same time, the newly created Northern Ireland, which covered most of Ulster, remained part of the United Kingdom. As a dominion within the British Empire, the Free State legally retained the same person as monarch as the United Kingdom—which in 1927 changed its name to the United Kingdom of Great Britain and Northern Ireland. In 1937, the Free State adopted a new constitution that removed all mention of the monarchy. In April 1949, the former Free State, which covered most of Ireland, declared itself a republic, and withdrew from the Commonwealth of Nations; this left Northern Ireland as the only part of the island that retained a monarchical system.

== Gaelic kingdoms ==
Gaelic Ireland consisted of as few as five and as many as nine Primary kingdoms (Cúicide/Cóicide 'fifths') which were often subdivided into many minor smaller kingdoms (Tuatha, 'folkdoms'). The primary kingdoms were Ailech, Airgíalla, Connacht, Leinster, Mide, Osraige, Munster, Thomond and Ulster. Until the end of Gaelic Ireland they continued to fluctuate, expand and contract in size, as well as dissolving entirely or being amalgamated into new entities. The role of High King of Ireland was primarily titular and rarely (if ever) absolute. Gaelic Ireland was not ruled as a unitary state.

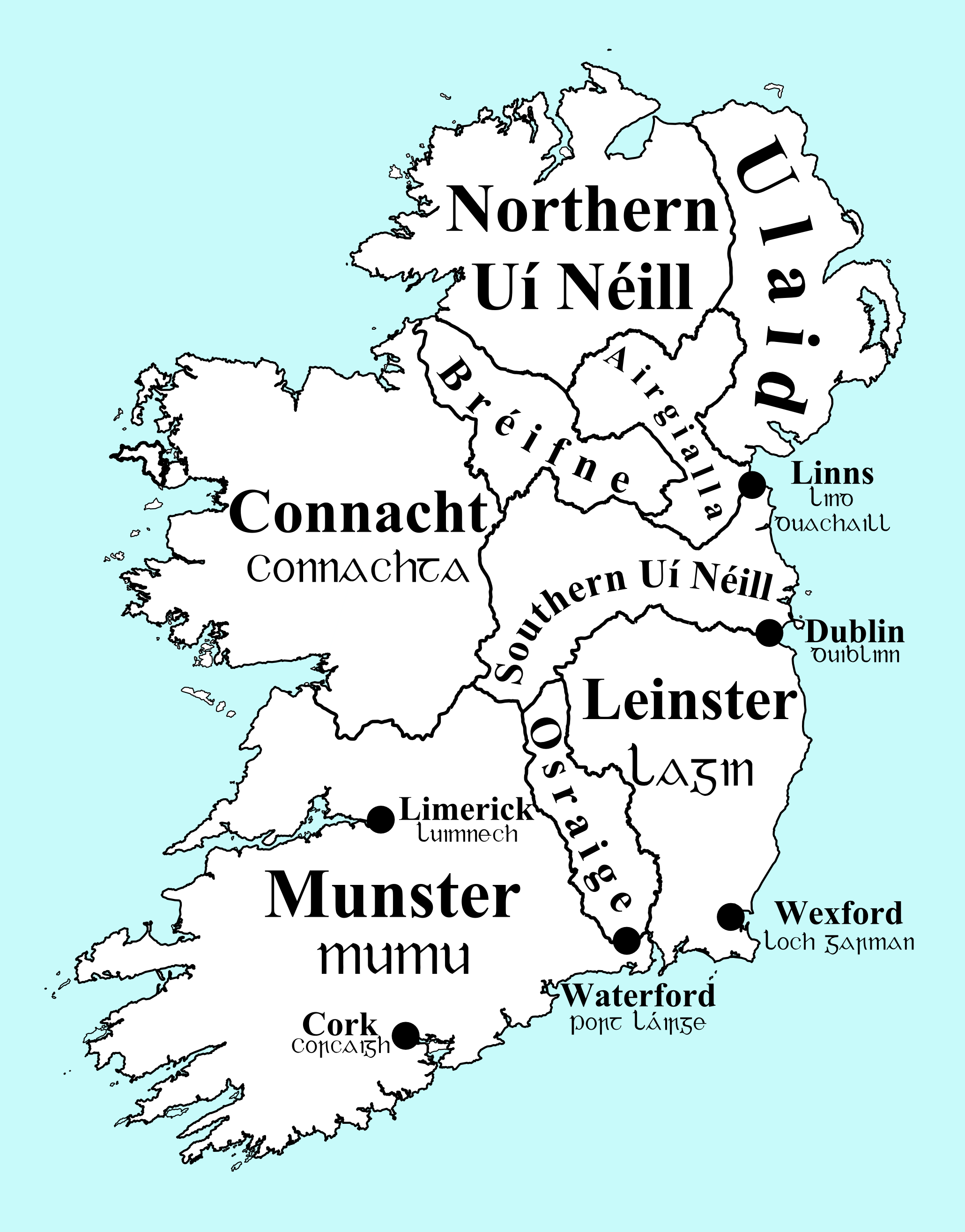
Map of Ireland (900 AD)

The names of Connacht, Ulster, Leinster and Munster are still in use, now applied to the four modern provinces of Ireland. The following is a list of the main Irish kingdoms and their kings:

- Kings of Ailech (5th century to 1185)
- Kings of Airgíalla (?-1590)
- Kings of Connacht (406–1474)
- Kings of Leinster (634 to 1603 or 1632 (de facto))
- Kings of Mide (8th–12th centuries)
- Kings of Osraige (to 12th century)
- Kings of Munster (4th century to 1138 or 1194 (claimant))
- Kings of Thomond (1118–1543)
- Kings of Ulster (5th–12th centuries)

=== Ard Rí co Fresabra: High Kings with opposition ===
Máire Herbert has noted that "Annal evidence from the late eighth century in Ireland suggests that the larger provincial kingships were already accruing power at the expense of smaller political units. Leading kings appear in public roles at church-state proclamations ... and at royal conferences with their peers." (2000, p. 62). Responding to the assumption of the title ri hErenn uile ("king of all Ireland") by Mael Sechlainn I in 862, she furthermore states that

the ninth-century assumption of the title of "ri Erenn" was a first step towards the definition of a national kingship and a territorially-based Irish realm. Yet change only gained ground after the stranglehold of Uí Néill power-structures was broken in the eleventh century. ... The renaming of a kingship ... engendered a new self-perception which shaped the future definition of a kingdom and of its subjects.

— Herbert, 2000, p. 72

Nevertheless, the achievements of Máel Sechnaill I and his successors were purely personal, and open to destruction upon their deaths. Between 846 and 1022, and again from 1042 to 1166, kings from the leading Irish kingdoms made greater attempts to compel the rest of the island's populace to their rule, with varying degrees of success, until the inauguration of Ruaidri Ua Conchobair (Rory O'Connor) in 1166,

==== High Kings of Ireland, 800–1198 ====
- Máel Sechnaill mac Máele Ruanaid, 846–860
- Áed Findliath, 861–876
- Flann Sinna, 877–914
- Niall Glúndub, 915–917
- Donnchad Donn, 918–942
- Congalach Cnogba, 943–954
- Domnall ua Néill, 955–978
- Máel Sechnaill mac Domnaill, 979–1002 and 1014–1022
- Brian Boru, 1002–1014
- Donnchad mac Briain, died 1064
- Diarmait mac Máel na mBó, died 1072
- Toirdelbach Ua Briain, died 1086
- Muirchertach Ua Briain, died 1119
- Domnall Ua Lochlainn, died 1121
- Toirdelbach Ua Conchobair, c.1119–1156
- Muirchertach Mac Lochlainn, c.1156–1166
- Ruaidrí Ua Conchobair, 1166–1198

==== Ruaidrí, King of Ireland ====
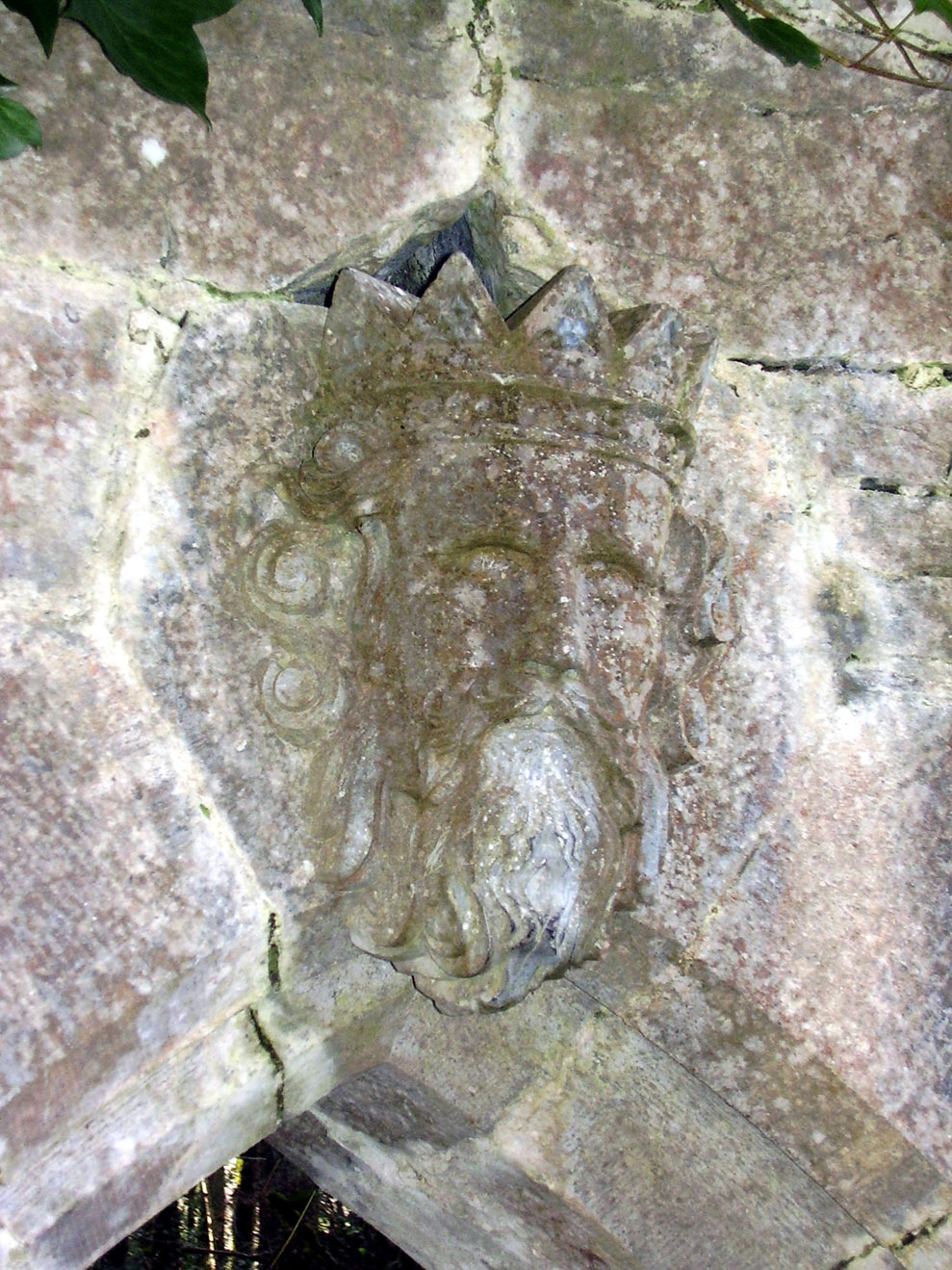
Ruaidrí Ua Conchobair

Upon the death of Muirchertach Mac Lochlainn in early 1166, Ruaidrí, King of Connacht, proceeded to Dublin where he was inaugurated King of Ireland without opposition. He was arguably the first undisputed full king of Ireland. He was also the last Gaelic one, as the events of the Norman invasion of 1169–1171 brought about the destruction of the high-kingship, and the direct involvement of the Kings of England in Irish politics.

One of Ruaidrí's first acts as king was the subduing of Leinster, which resulted in the exile of its king, Diarmait Mac Murchada. Ruaidrí then obtained terms and hostages from all the notable kings and lords. He then celebrated the Oenach Tailteann, a recognised prerogative of the High Kings, and made a number of notable charitable gifts and donations. However, his caput remained in his home territory in central Connacht (County Galway). Ireland's recognised capital, Dublin, was ruled by Ascall mac Ragnaill, who had submitted to Ruaidrí.

Only with the arrival of MacMurrough's Anglo-Norman benefactors in May 1169 did Ruaidrí's position begin to weaken. A series of disastrous defeats and ill-judged treaties lost him much of Leinster, and encouraged uprisings by rebel lords. By the time of the arrival of Henry II in 1171, Ruaidrí's position as king of Ireland was increasingly untenable.

Ruaidrí at first remained aloof from engagement with King Henry, though many of the lesser kings and lords welcomed his arrival as they wished to see him curb the territorial gains made by his vassals. Through the intercession of Lorcán Ua Tuathail (Laurence O'Toole), the Archbishop of Dublin, Ruaidrí and Henry came to terms with the Treaty of Windsor in 1175. Ruaidrí agreed to recognise Henry as his lord; in return, Ruaidrí was allowed to keep all Ireland as his personal kingdom outside the petty kingdoms of Laigin (Leinster) and Mide as well as the city of Waterford.

Henry was unwilling or unable to enforce the terms of the treaty on his barons in Ireland, who continued to gain territory in Ireland. A low point came in 1177 with a successful raid into the heart of Connacht by a party of Anglo-Normans, led by one of Ruaidrí's sons, Prince Muirchertach. They were expelled, Ruaidrí ordering the blinding of Muirchertach, but over the next six years his rule was increasingly diminished by internal dynastic conflict and external attacks. Finally, in 1183, he abdicated.

He was twice briefly returned to power in 1185 and 1189, but even within his home kingdom of Connacht he had become politically marginalized. He lived quietly on his estates, died at the monastery of Cong in 1198 and was buried at Clonmacnoise. With the possible exception of the short reign of Brian Ua Néill (Brian O'Neill) in 1258–1260, no other Gaelic king was ever again recognised as king or high king of Ireland.

== Lordship of Ireland: 1171–1542 ==
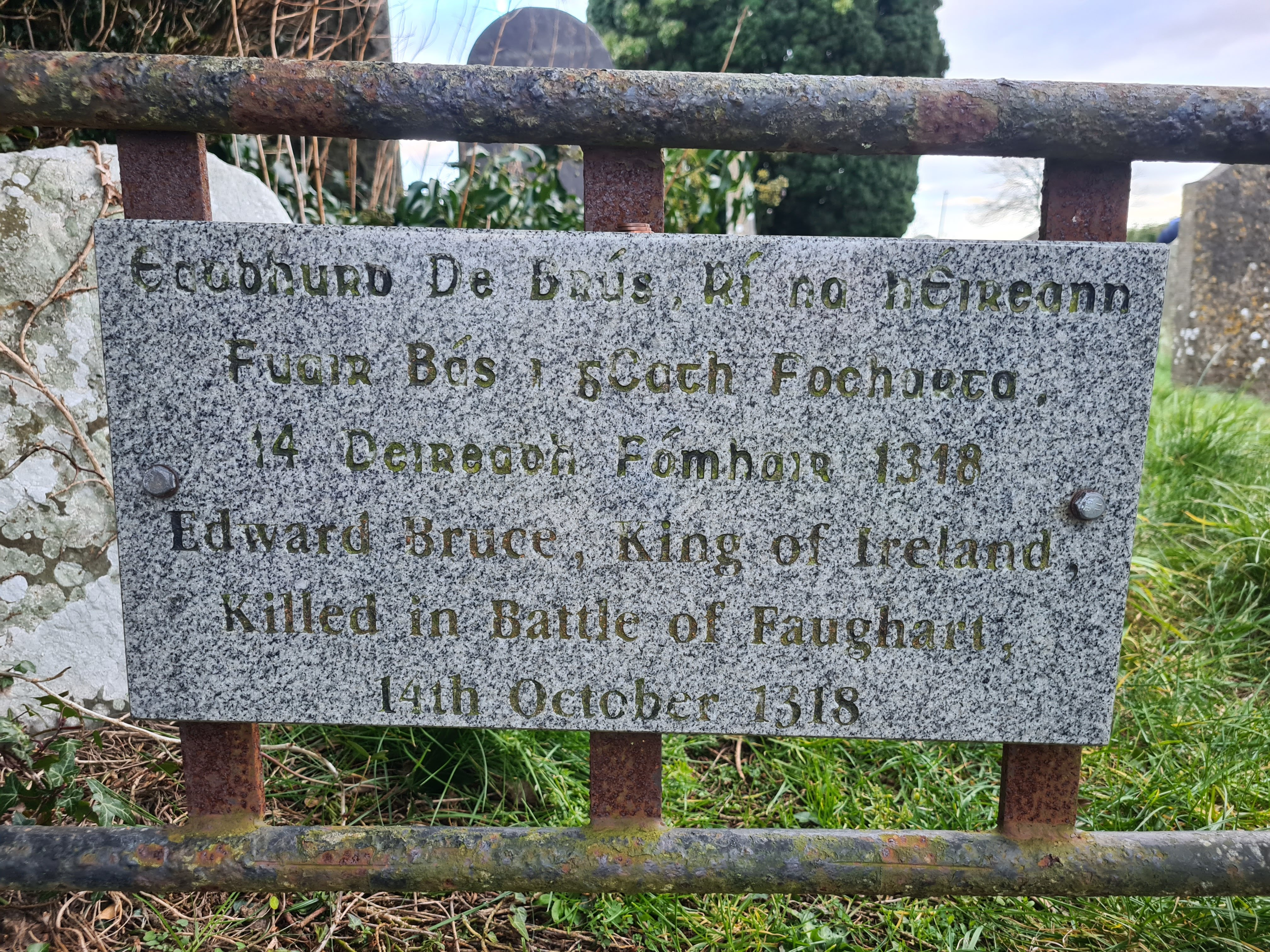
Grave marker of Edward Bruce who claimed the title of High King between 1315 and 1318; he is described as "King of Ireland."

By the time of Ruaidrí's reign in 1171, King Henry II of England had invaded Ireland and given the part of it he controlled to his son John as a Lordship when John was just ten years old in 1177. When John succeeded to the English throne in 1199, he remained Lord of Ireland thereby bringing the kingdom of England and the lordship of Ireland into personal union. By the mid-13th century, while the island was nominally ruled by the king of England, from c.1260 the effective area of control began to recede. As various Cambro-Norman noble families died out in the male line, the Gaelic nobility began to reclaim lost territory. Successive English kings did little to stem the tide, instead using Ireland to draw upon men and supplies in the wars in Scotland and France.

By the 1390s the Lordship had effectively shrunk to the Pale (a fortified area around the city of Dublin) with the rest of the island under the control of independent Gaelic-Irish or rebel Cambro-Norman noble families. King Richard II of England made two journeys to Ireland during his reign to rectify the situation; as a direct result of his second visit in 1399 he lost his throne to Henry Bolingbroke. This was the last time that a medieval king of England visited Ireland.

For the duration of the 15th century, royal power in Ireland was weak, the country being dominated by the various clans and dynasties of Gaelic (O'Neill, O'Brien, MacCarthy) or Cambro-Norman (Burke, FitzGerald, Butler) origin.

In 1540, Irish nobles and chiefs offered to recognise James V of Scotland as Lord Ireland, as a challenge to Henry VIII.

=== Lords of Ireland, 1177–1542 ===
- John (1177–1216)
  - First Lord of Ireland and established the precedent that the Lord of Ireland would also be King of England.
  - Prince Louis of France invaded England in May 1216 and seized control of half the kingdom, but was defeated in September 1217 and agreed to give up his claim to the throne.
- Henry III (1216–1272)
  - Henry III granted Ireland to his son, Edward I, in 1254 on condition that it would never be separated from the Crown.
  - Brian Ua Néill claimed the title of High King of Ireland from 1258 to 1260, until his defeat and death in the Battle of Druim Dearg (also known as the Battle of Down).
- Edward I (1272–1307)
- Edward II (1307–1327)
  - Edward Bruce, Earl of Carrick and brother of Robert Bruce, King of Scotland, declared himself High King of Ireland during a failed rebellion of 1315–1318, which formed part of the larger war between England and Scotland.
- Edward III (1327–1377)
- Richard II (1377–1399)
  - Robert de Vere was created Duke of Ireland in 1386, but forfeited his titles in 1388.
- Henry IV (1399–1413)
- Henry V (1413–1422)
- Henry VI (1422–1461)
- Edward IV (1461–1470)
- Henry VI (1470–1471)
- Edward IV (1471–1483)
- Edward V (1483)
- Richard III (1483–1485)
- Henry VII (1485–1509)
  - Lambert Simnel claimed to be Edward Plantagenet, 17th Earl of Warwick, and was crowned "King Edward VI" in Christ Church Cathedral, Dublin on 24 May 1487. His claim ended with the Battle of Stoke Field, 16 June 1487.
  - Perkin Warbeck claimed to be Richard of Shrewsbury, Duke of York ("Richard IV") and gained some Irish support before a failed invasion of England in 1495.
- Henry VIII (1509–1542)

The title of "Lord of Ireland" was abolished by Henry VIII, who was made King of Ireland by the Parliament of Ireland via the Crown of Ireland Act 1542.

== Kingdom of Ireland, 1542–1800 ==
=== Re-creation of title ===
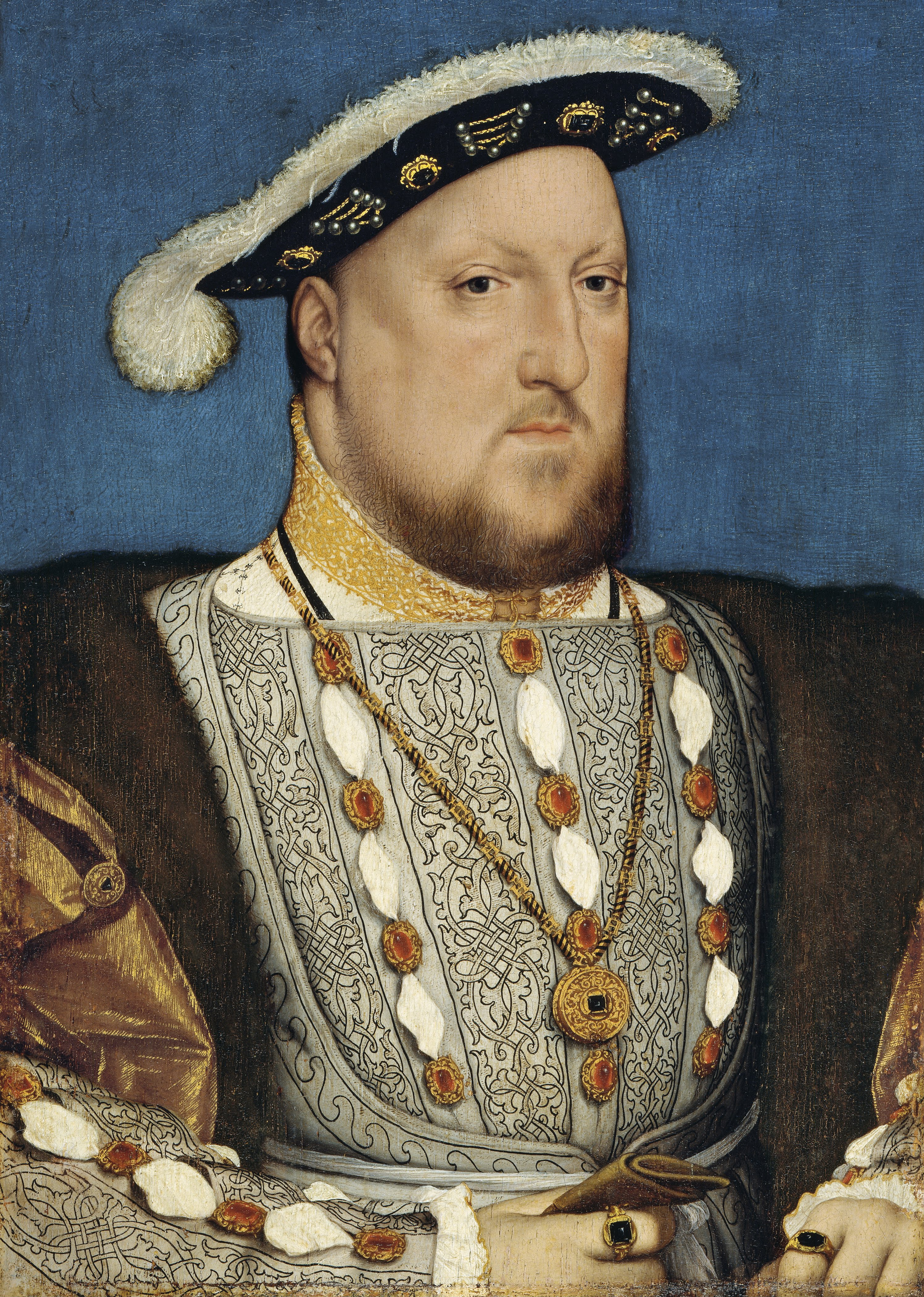
Henry VIII claimed the title "King of Ireland" in 1542.

The title "King of Ireland" was created by an act of the Irish Parliament in 1541, replacing the Lordship of Ireland, which had existed since 1171, with the Kingdom of Ireland.

The Duke of Richmond and Somerset, Henry VIII's illegitimate son and Lord Lieutenant of Ireland, had been considered for elevation as the newly created King of Ireland. However, Henry VIII's counsellors feared that creating a separate Kingdom of Ireland, with a ruler other than that of England, would create another threat like the King of Scotland, and Richmond died in 1536.

The Crown of Ireland Act 1542 established a personal union between the English and Irish crowns, providing that whoever was King of England was to be King of Ireland as well, and so its first holder was King Henry VIII of England. Henry's sixth and last wife, Katherine Parr, was the first Queen consort of Ireland following her marriage to King Henry in 1543.

The title of King of Ireland was created after Henry VIII had been excommunicated in 1538, so it was not recognised by European Catholic monarchs. Following the accession of the Catholic Mary I in 1553 and her marriage to Philip II of Spain, in 1554, Pope Paul IV issued the papal bull "Ilius" in 1555, recognising them as Queen and King of Ireland together with her heirs and successors.

In 1595, Irish clan chiefs Hugh O'Neill, Earl of Tyrone and Hugh Roe O'Donnell offered the Irish crown to Albert of Austria, Governor General of the Habsburg Netherlands and cousin of Philip II of Spain, in the hope of obtaining Spanish support in the ongoing Nine Years War.

For a brief period in the 17th century, during the Wars of the Three Kingdoms from the impeachment and execution of Charles I in 1649 to the Irish Restoration in May 1660, there was no 'King of Ireland'. After the Irish Rebellion of 1641, Irish Catholics, organised in Confederate Ireland, still recognised Charles I, and later Charles II, as legitimate monarchs, in opposition to the claims of the English Parliament, and signed a formal treaty with Charles I in 1648. However, in 1649, the Rump Parliament, victorious in the English Civil War, executed Charles I, and made England a republic, or "Commonwealth". The Parliamentarian general Oliver Cromwell came across the Irish Sea to crush the Irish royalists, temporarily uniting England, Scotland, and Ireland under one government, and styling himself "Lord Protector" of the three kingdoms (see also Cromwellian conquest of Ireland). After Cromwell's death in 1658, his son Richard emerged as the leader of this pan-British Isles republic, but he was not competent to maintain it. The Parliament of England at Westminster voted to restore the monarchy, and in 1660 King Charles II returned from exile in France to become King of England, King of Scotland and King of Ireland.

=== Union with Great Britain, 1707–1922 ===
The Acts of Union 1707 merged the kingdoms of England and Scotland into the Kingdom of Great Britain, under the sovereignty of the British Crown. The effect was to create a personal union between the Crown of Ireland and the British Crown, instead of the English Crown. Later, from 1 January 1801, an additional merger took place between the two Kingdoms. By the terms of the Acts of Union 1800, the Kingdom of Ireland merged with the Kingdom of Great Britain, thus creating the United Kingdom of Great Britain and Ireland. Following the separation of most of Ireland from that kingdom in 1922, the remaining constituent parts were renamed the United Kingdom of Great Britain and Northern Ireland in 1927, five years after the establishment of the Irish Free State.

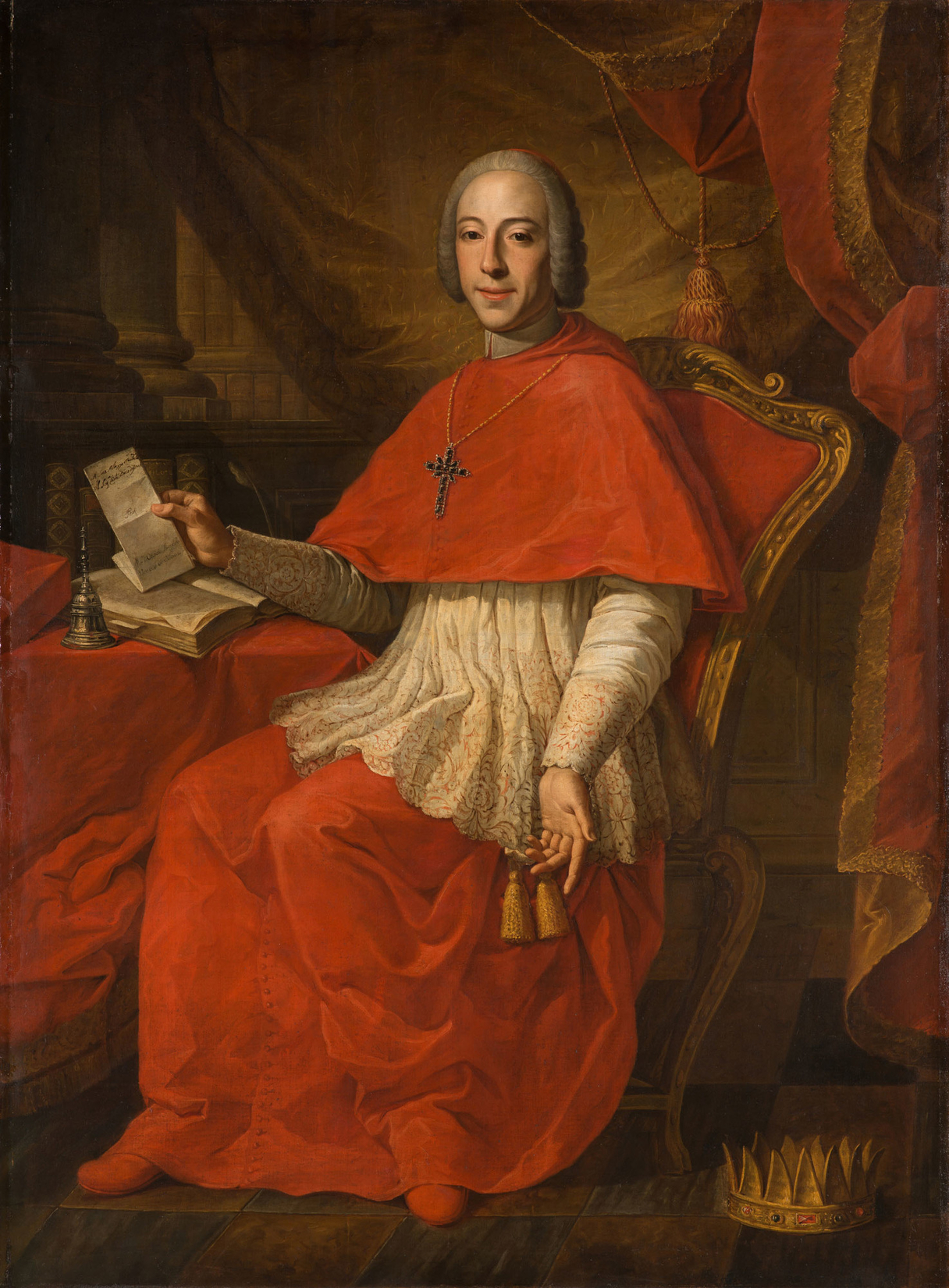
Jacobite pretender, Henry Benedict Stuart. The French Directory suggested to United Irishmen making him King of the Irish in 1798 but were rebuffed. Many Irishmen were Jacobites in the early 18th century.

During the early 18th century, a significant number of Irishmen who had fled Ireland in the aftermath of the Treaty of Limerick continued to remain loyal to the Jacobite Stuart pretenders as Kings of Ireland (particularly the Wild Geese military diaspora in France's Irish Brigade), contrary to the House of Hanover. However, Ireland was host to a large military establishment and thus, unlike Scotland, was not the ground for legitimist-royalist risings in the 18th century, turning instead, mostly to republicanism as dissention with the ascent of the United Irishmen. However, despite their general anti-clericalism and republicanism, the French Directory did suggest to the United Irishmen in 1798 restoring the Jacobite Pretender, Henry Benedict Stuart, as Henry IX, King of the Irish. This was on account of General Jean Joseph Amable Humbert landing a force in County Mayo for the Irish Rebellion of 1798 and realising the local population were devoutly Catholic (a significant number of Irish priests supported the Rising and had met with Humbert, although Humbert's Army had been veterans of the anti-clerical campaign in Italy). The French Directory hoped this option would allow the creation of a stable French client state in Ireland, however, Wolfe Tone, the Protestant republican leader, scoffed at the suggestion and it was quashed.

=== Partition: Irish Free State and Northern Ireland, 1922–1936 ===
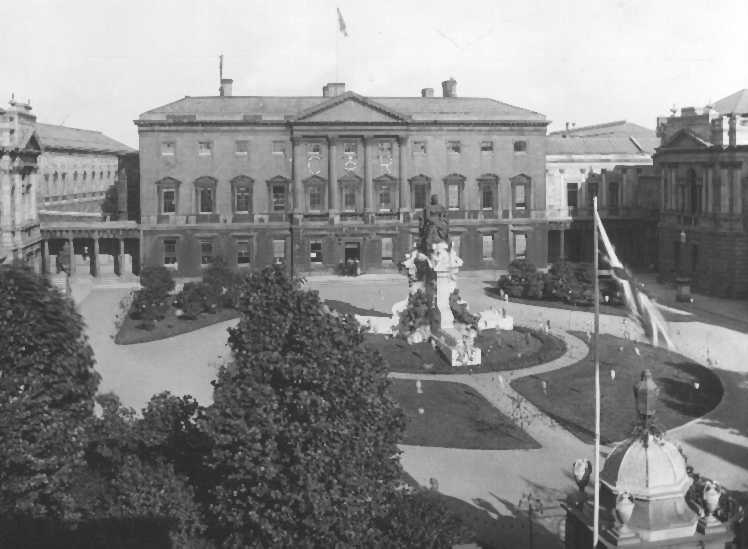
Leinster House, Dublin, decorated for the visit of King George V and Queen Mary in 1911. Within a decade it was the seat of the Oireachtas of the Irish Free State.

In early December 1922, most of Ireland (twenty-six of the country's thirty-two counties) left the United Kingdom of Great Britain and Ireland. These 'Twenty-Six Counties' now became the Irish Free State, a self-governing dominion within the British Empire. Six of Ireland's north-eastern counties, all within the nine-county Province of Ulster, remained within the United Kingdom as Northern Ireland. As a Dominion, the Free State was a constitutional monarchy with the British monarch as its head of state. The monarch was officially represented in the new Free State by the Governor-General of the Irish Free State.

The King's title in the Irish Free State was exactly the same as it was elsewhere in the British Empire, being from 1922 to 1927: "By the Grace of God, of the United Kingdom of Great Britain and Ireland and of the British Dominions beyond the Seas King, Defender of the Faith, Emperor of India" and, from 1927 to 1937: "By the Grace of God, of Great Britain, Ireland and the British Dominions beyond the Seas King, Defender of the Faith, Emperor of India". The change in the King's title was effected under an Act of the Parliament of the United Kingdom called the Royal and Parliamentary Titles Act, 1927, intended to update the name of the United Kingdom as well as the King's title to reflect the fact that most of the island of Ireland had left the United Kingdom. The Act therefore provided that "Parliament shall hereafter be known as and styled the Parliament of the United Kingdom of Great Britain and Northern Ireland [instead of the Parliament of the United Kingdom of Great Britain and Ireland]" and "In every Act passed and public document issued after the passing of this Act the expression 'United Kingdom' shall, unless the context otherwise requires, mean Great Britain and Northern Ireland."

According to The Times, the "Imperial Conference proposed that, as a result of the establishment of the Irish Free State, the title of the king should be changed to 'George V, by the Grace of God, of Great Britain, Ireland, and the British Dominions beyond the seas King, Defender of the Faith, Emperor of India.'" The change did not mean that the king had now assumed different styles in the different parts of his Empire. That development did not formally occur until 1953, four years after the new Republic of Ireland had left the Commonwealth.

Despite a lack of change in his title, George V's position as king of that country became separated from his place as King of the United Kingdom (as occurred with all the other British Dominions at the time). The Government of the Irish Free State (also known as His Majesty's Government in the Irish Free State) was confident that the relationship of these independent countries under the Crown would function as a personal union.

=== Abdication crisis, President of Ireland and Republic of Ireland Act, 1936–1949 ===
The constitutional crisis resulting from the abdication of King Edward VIII in December 1936 was used by Éamon de Valera's government as a catalyst to amend the Constitution of the Irish Free State by eliminating all but one of the King's official duties. This was achieved with the enactment on 11 December of the Constitution (Amendment No. 27) Act, which removed the monarch from the constitution and, on 12 December, the External Relations Act, which provided that the monarch recognised by Britain and the rest of the Commonwealth could represent the Irish Free State "for the purposes of the appointment of diplomatic and consular representatives and the conclusion of international agreements" when authorised to do so by the Irish government. The following year, a new constitution was ratified, changing the name of the Free State to Éire, or "Ireland" in the English language, and establishing the office of President of Ireland. The King's role in Ireland was ambiguous. Whether the Irish head of state was George VI, or the President, was left unclear. This ambiguity was eliminated with the enactment of the Republic of Ireland Act 1948, which came into force in April 1949 and declared the state to be a republic. The External Relations Act was repealed, removing the remaining duties of the monarch, and Ireland formally withdrew from the British Commonwealth. The position of the king in the Irish state was finally and formally ended by the Oireachtas with the repeal of the Crown of Ireland Act 1542 by the Statute Law Revision (Pre-Union Irish Statutes) Act 1962.

According to Desmond Oulton (owner of Clontarf Castle), his father John George Oulton had suggested to Éamon de Valera towards the end of the Irish Free State, that Ireland should have its own king again, as it was in the times of Gaelic Ireland. He suggested to him, a member of the O'Brien Clan, descended in the paternal line from Brian Boru, a previous High King of Ireland: the most senior representative at the time was Donough O'Brien, 16th Baron Inchiquin. Oulton said that Donough's nephew Conor O'Brien, 18th Baron Inchiquin, confirmed that De Valera did offer Donough O'Brien the title of Prince-President of the Irish Republic, but this was turned down and so a President of Ireland was instituted instead.

The British monarchy, specifically, continued and continues in Northern Ireland, which remains a part of the sovereign state that is the United Kingdom of Great Britain and Northern Ireland. From 1921 until 1973, the British monarch was officially represented in Northern Ireland by the Governor of Northern Ireland.

=== List of monarchs of Ireland ===
==== Monarchs of Ireland ====
British monarchs:

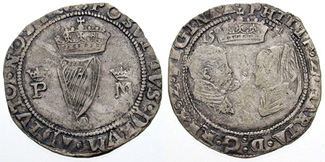
An Irish groat depicting Philip and Mary

- Henry VIII (1542–1547); Lord of Ireland, 1509–1542; made king by the Crown of Ireland Act 1542
- Edward VI (1547–1553)
- Lady Jane Grey (1553; disputed)
- Mary I (1553–1558)
  - Philip (of Spain) (1554–1558) jure uxoris; the Spanish king (Mary's husband)'s title as King of Ireland was reinforced by the Treason Act 1554
- Elizabeth I (1558–1603)
- James I (1603–1625)
- Charles I (1625–1649)

The Wars of the Three Kingdoms (incorporating the Irish Rebellion of 1641, Confederate Ireland, the Cromwellian conquest of Ireland and the Irish Confederate Wars) took place between 1639 and 1653. Charles I was executed in 1649 and his son Charles II was recognised by some Irish lords as King of Ireland. The Interregnum began with England, Ireland, Scotland and Wales ruled by the Council of State, then the Lord Protector Oliver Cromwell (1649–1658) and his son Richard Cromwell (1658–1659). The Restoration in Ireland was effected in 1660 without major opposition, Charles II being declared king on 14 May 1660 by the Irish Convention.

- Charles II (1660–1685)
- James II (1685–1689)
- William III (1689–1702) and Mary II (1689–1694)

The position of King of Ireland was contested by William III and James II between 1689 and 1691, after the Glorious Revolution of 1688. The Crown and Parliament Recognition Act 1689 made William King of Ireland, and this was reinforced by his victory in the Williamite War in Ireland.

After William III's death, the monarchy continued with:

- Anne (1702–1714)
  - The Acts of Union 1707 united the Kingdom of England and Kingdom of Scotland to form the Kingdom of Great Britain. However, the Kingdom of Ireland remained a separate state.
- George I (1714–1727)
- George II (1727–1760)
- George III (1760–1801)

The Acts of Union 1800, which came into force on 1 January 1801, was instituted in response to the Irish Rebellion of 1798 and created the United Kingdom of Great Britain and Ireland.

- George III (1801–1820)
- George IV (1820–1830)
- William IV (1830–1837)
- Victoria (1837–1901)
- Edward VII (1901–1910)
- George V (1910–1922)

==== Monarchs of the Irish Free State and Ireland ====
The royal arms of Ireland – Badge of Ireland, used during the period of the Kingdom of Ireland on coins, etc.

- George V (1922–1936) (The Irish Free State became a self-governing Dominion of the British Empire and subsequently, in 1931, a legislatively independent country.)
- Edward VIII (1936)
- Arguably George VI (1936–1949), whose status was diminished (see Irish head of state from 1922 to 1949).

Following the Ireland Act 1949, only the part of Ireland known as Northern Ireland remained part of a monarchy.

==== Monarchs of Northern Ireland ====
As part of the United Kingdom of Great Britain and Northern Ireland.

- George V (1922–1936)
- Edward VIII (1936)
- George VI (1936–1952)
- Elizabeth II (1952–2022)
- Charles III (2022–present)

==== King's title, George V – George VI ====
The king's title in the Irish Free State, when it became a self-governing Dominion of the British Empire, and its constitutional successor from December 1936 to April 1949, was the same as elsewhere in the British Commonwealth, but it was unclear whether the President of Ireland or the king was head of state.

The changes in the royal style in the 20th century took into account the emergence of independence for the dominions from the Imperial Parliament of the United Kingdom. The kings successively and their advisers and governments in the United Kingdom were fully aware that the republican intent of the representatives of the Irish Free State was in marked contrast to the intent of the governments of certain other dominions, such as Canada. and such differences were manifested in this period in the design and use of flags and other national symbols for the Irish Free State and other dominions.

== Proposed Irish monarchy ==
In 1906, Patrick Pearse, writing in the newspaper An Claidheamh Soluis, envisioned the Ireland of 2006 as an independent Irish-speaking kingdom with an "Ard Rí" or "High King" as head of state.

During the Easter Rising in Dublin in 1916, some Republican leaders, including Pearse and Joseph Plunkett, contemplated giving the throne of an independent Ireland to Prince Joachim of Prussia. While they were not in favour of a monarchy in itself, Pearse and Plunkett thought that if the uprising were successful and Germany won the First World War, they would insist on an independent Ireland being a monarchy with a German prince as king, in the same way as Romania and Bulgaria in the previous century; this assertion proved basically correct in the case of the short-lived Kingdom of Finland. The fact that Joachim did not speak English was considered an advantage, as he might be more disposed to learning and promoting the use of the Irish language. In his memoirs, Desmond FitzGerald wrote:

That would have certain advantages for us. It would mean that a movement for de-anglicisation would flow from the head of the state downwards, for what was English would be foreign to the head of the state. He would naturally turn to those who were more Irish and Gaelic, as to his friends, for the non-nationalist element in our country had shown themselves to be so bitterly anti-German ... For the first generation or so it would be an advantage, in view of our natural weakness, to have a ruler who linked us with a dominant European power, and thereafter, when we were better prepared to stand alone, or when it might be undesirable that our ruler should turn by personal choice to one power rather than be guided by what was most natural and beneficial for our country, the ruler of that time would have become completely Irish.

Ernest Blythe recalls that in January 1915 he heard Plunkett and Thomas MacDonagh express support for the idea at an Irish Volunteers meeting. No objections were made by anyone and Bulmer Hobson was among the attendees. Blythe himself said he found the idea "immensely attractive".

Sinn Féin was established in 1905 by Arthur Griffith as a monarchist party inspired by the Austro-Hungarian Compromise which sought to create an Anglo-Irish dual monarchy, essentially returning to the pre-1801 position plus responsible government. During the party's 1917 Ard Fheis, disputes between monarchists and republicans resulted in an agreement that the question of a republic versus a monarchy would be settled by public referendum after independence was achieved provided that no member of the House of Windsor could become king. As a result, the Irish Republic had no head of state during the Irish War of Independence until the Anglo-Irish Treaty negotiations when Éamon de Valera raised his status to President of the Irish Republic in order to grant himself equal status to George V.

In the 1930s, an organisation known as the Irish Monarchist Society, whose members included Francis Stuart and Osmonde Esmonde, plotted to overthrow the Irish Free State and establish an independent Irish Catholic monarchy under a member of the O'Neill dynasty.

According to Hugo O'Donnell, 7th Duke of Tetuan, de Valera raised the idea of an Irish monarchy with his great-grandfather Juan O'Donnell.

Raymond Moulton O'Brien, the self-styled "Prince of Thomond", and the United Christian Nationalist Party, of which O'Brien was the leader, wanted to reestablish the monarchy with O'Brien as king.
