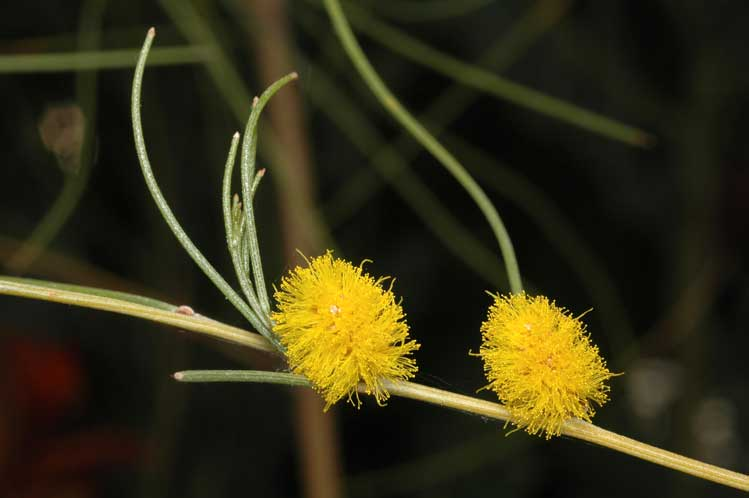
- In the Australian National Botanic Gardens

Scientific classification
- Kingdom: Plantae
- Clade: Tracheophytes
- Clade: Angiosperms
- Clade: Eudicots
- Clade: Rosids
- Order: Fabales
- Family: Fabaceae
- Subfamily: Caesalpinioideae
- Clade: Mimosoid clade
- Genus: Acacia
- Species: A. coolgardiensis

Binomial name
- Acacia coolgardiensis Maiden
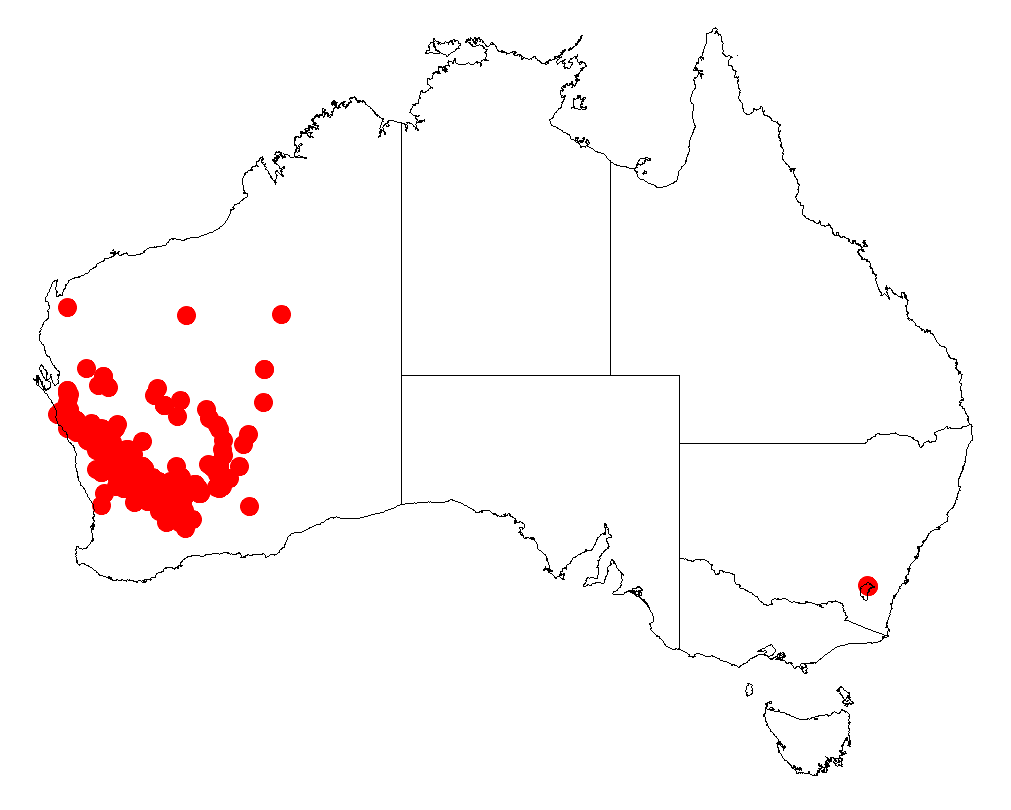
- Occurrence data from AVH

Synonyms
- Acacia coolgardiensis Maiden subsp. coolgardiensis; Racosperma coolgardiense (Maiden) Pedley; Racosperma coolgardiense (Maiden) Pedley subsp. coolgardiense

= Acacia coolgardiensis =

Sugar brother

Species of legume

Acacia coolgardiensis, commonly known as sugar brother, is a species of flowering plant in the family Fabaceae and is endemic to Western Australia. It is a multistemmed shrub or tree with smooth bark except on oldest plants, terete, thread-like phyllodes, oblong to short cylindrical heads of golden yellow flowers and thinly leathery to crusty, straight to slightly curved pods.

== Description ==
Acacia coolgardiensis is a multi-stemmed shrub or tree that typically grows to a height of 2–5 m (6 ft 7 in – 16 ft 5 in), sometimes to 7 m (23 ft). Its bark is smooth, but finely fissured at the base of the oldest plants. The phyllodes are terete, thread-like, 60–110 mm (2.4–4.3 in) long and 0.6–0.8 mm (0.024–0.031 in) wide, not rigid but sometimes sharply pointed. The flowers are borne in usually two oblong to shortly cylindrical golden yellow heads 5–9 mm (0.20–0.35 in) long and 5–6 mm (0.20–0.24 in) in diameter, in axils on peduncles 0.5–2 mm (0.020–0.079 in) long. The pods ae straight to slightly curved, terete, 40–80 mm (1.6–3.1 in) long, 1–2 mm (0.039–0.079 in) wide and thinly leathery to crusty. The seeds are oblong, 2.2–4 mm (0.087–0.157 in) long and shiny with a creamy-white aril.

== Taxonomy ==
Acacia coolgardiensis was first formally described in 1920 by Joseph Maiden in the Journal and Proceedings of the Royal Society of New South Wales based on a description by Alexander Morrison of Acacia aciphylla in the Scottish Botanical Review and a description of the fruit from near Kununoppin supplied by Frederick Stoward. The specific epithet (coolgardiensis) means 'native of the town of Coolgardie'.

This species belongs in the Section Juliflorae.

Three previously recognised subspecies are now considered to be more appropriately treated as distinct species:

- Acacia coolgardiensis subsp. coolgardiensis is now treated as a synonym of Acacia coolgardiensis.
- Acacia coolgardiensis subsp. effusa is now treated as Acacia effusifolia Maslin & Buscomb
- Acacia coolgardiensis subsp. latior is now treated as Acacia latior Maslin & Buscomb

== Distribution and habitat ==
This species of wattle grows in a wide variety of soils including granitic or lateritic gravel, sand, sandy loam or loam, often on sandplains, but also on low hills and granite outcrops in shrubland and spinifex. It is widely distributed from Nerren Nerren Station (about 80 km (50 mi) north-east of Kalbarri) and Northampton, south-east to near Holt Rock and Menangina Station (about 80 km (50 mi) east of Menzies in the Avon Wheatbelt, Carnarvon, Coolgardie, Geraldton Sandplains, Great Victoria Desert, Jarrah Forest, Mallee, Murchison and Yalgoo bioregions of Western Australia.

== Conservation status ==
Acacia coolgardiensis is listed as "not threatened" by the Government of Western Australia Department of Biodiversity, Conservation and Attractions.

== See also ==
- List of Acacia species
