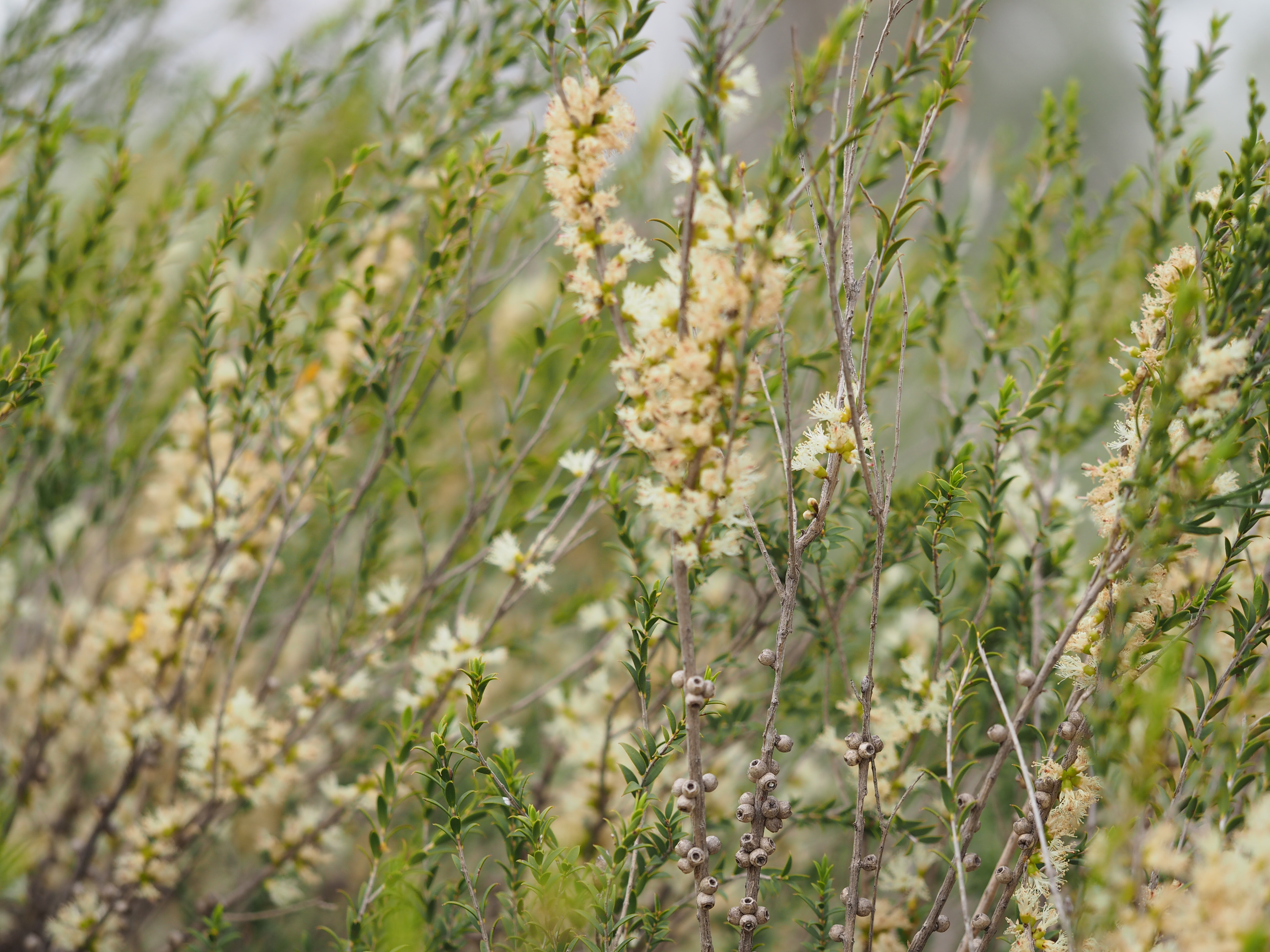

Scientific classification
- Kingdom: Plantae
- Clade: Tracheophytes
- Clade: Angiosperms
- Clade: Eudicots
- Clade: Rosids
- Order: Myrtales
- Family: Myrtaceae
- Genus: Melaleuca
- Species: M. acuminata

Binomial name
- Melaleuca acuminata F.Muell.

Synonyms
- Myrtoleucodendron acuminatum (F.Muell.) Kuntze

= Melaleuca acuminata =

Mallee honeymyrtle

Species of plant

Melaleuca acuminata, commonly known as mallee honeymyrtle is a plant in the myrtle family, Myrtaceae and is native to Australia and widespread in temperate areas of the continent. It is an erect shrub to about 3 m (9.8 ft) usually found in mallee woodland.

== Description ==
Melaleuca acuminata is an erect, rather open shrub with papery or fibrous bark and many ascending branches. The leaves are in alternating pairs on either side of the stem (decussate), narrow elliptic in shape, 5–10 mm (0.2–0.4 in) long, 2–4 mm (0.08–0.2 in) wide with a short petiole.

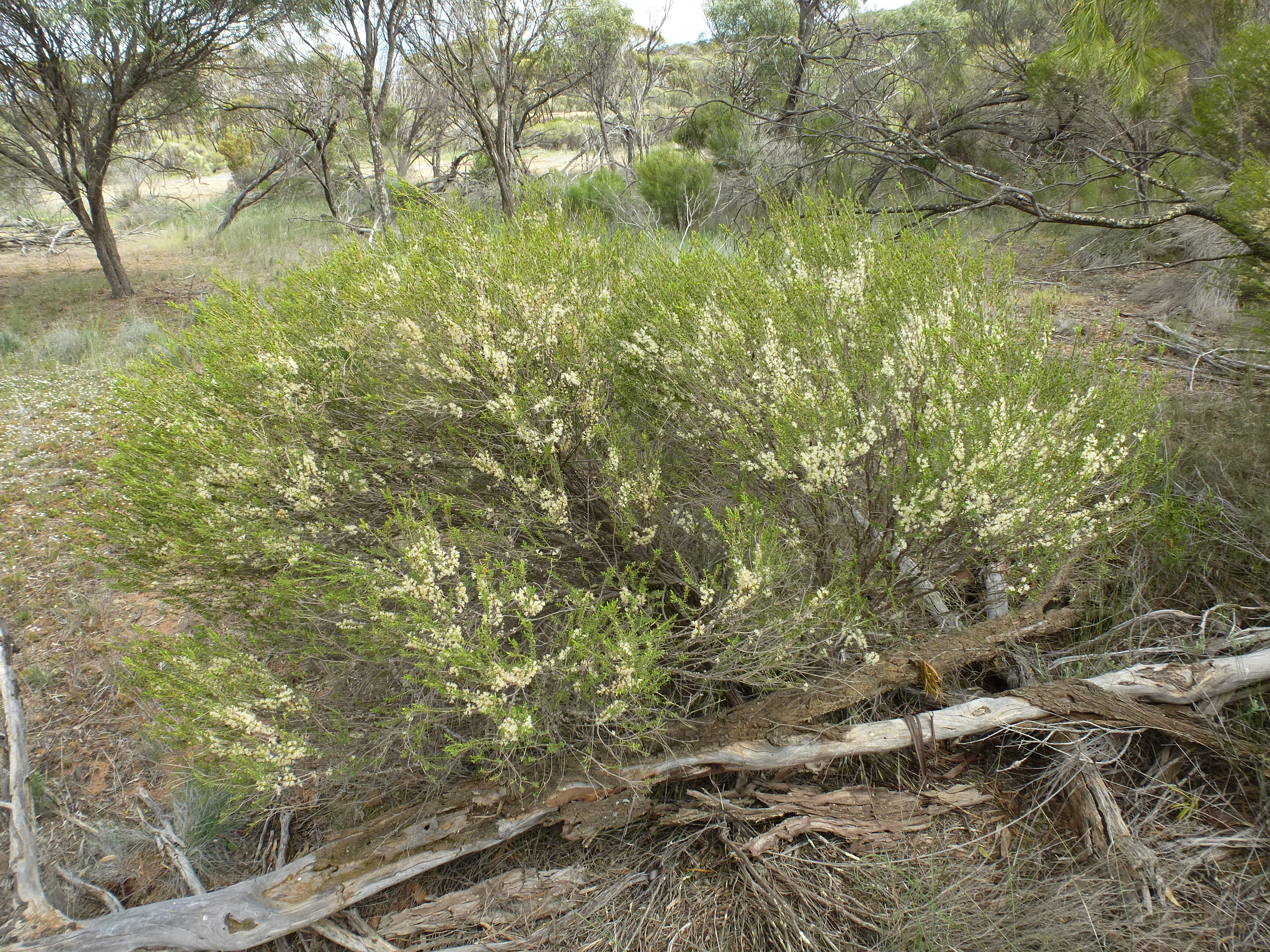
Habit in the Kalgarin Nature Reserve near Corrigin.

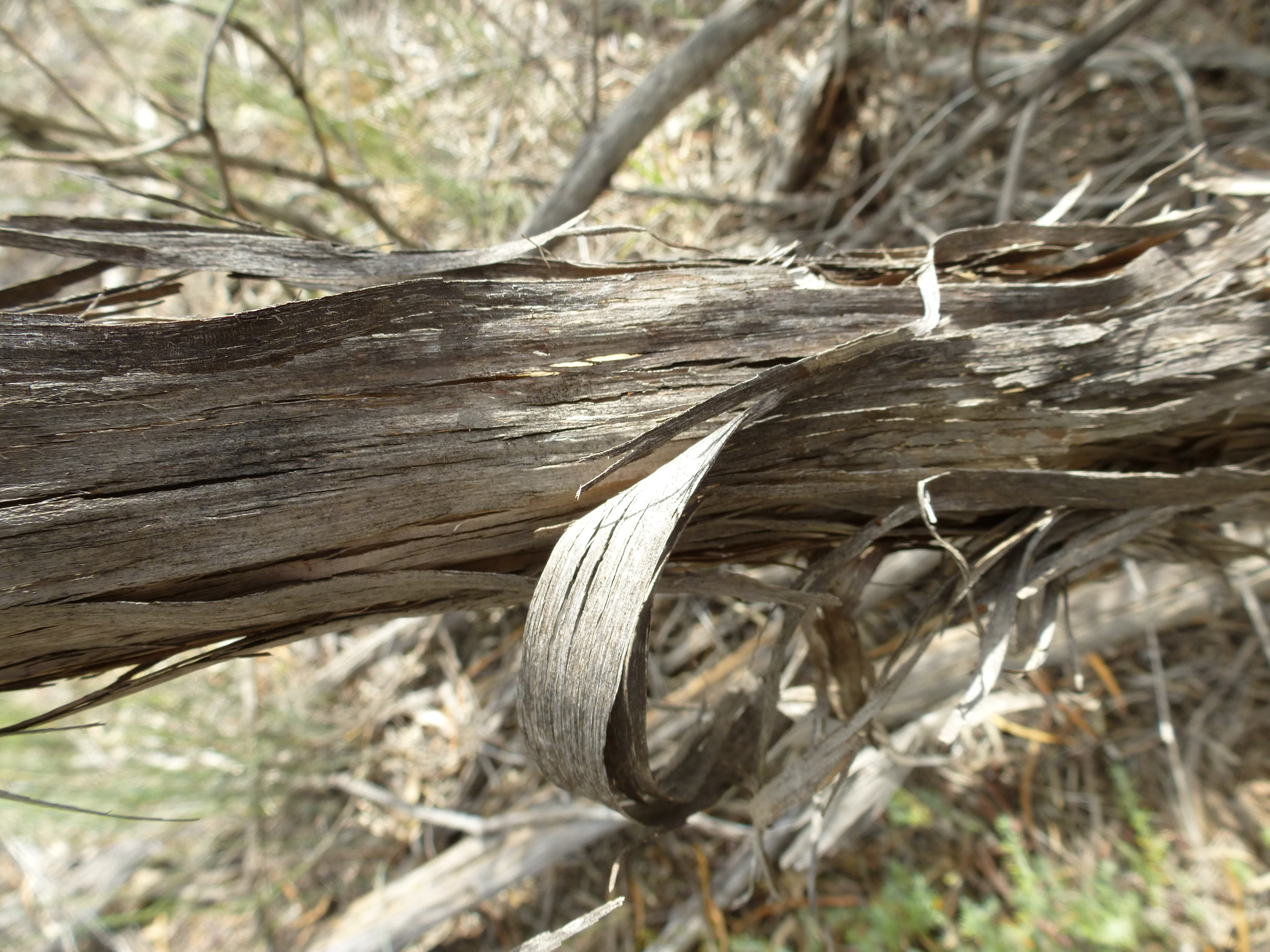
Bark

The flowers are cream or white, sometimes tinged with pink and are in cluster of three to six, the clusters occurring along the stem over a considerable length. The stamens are grouped into five clusters or "claws" and there are 9 to 17 stamens per claw. Flowering occurs in spring and is followed by fruit which are smooth, woody capsules, 3–5 mm (0.1–0.2 in) diameter borne singly or in small clusters.

== Taxonomy and naming ==
Melaleuca acuminata was first described in 1858 by Ferdinand von Mueller in Fragmenta Phytographiae Australiae from a specimen found "in the stony hills of Mount Barker Creek by L. Fischer". The specific epithet (acuminata) is from the Latin acumen, meaning "sharp point" referring to the leaf tips.

In 1920, Spencer Le Marchant Moore described Melaleuca websteri in the Journal of the Linnean Society, Botany, but in 1999, Lyndley Craven and Brendan Lepschi reduced it to a subspecies of M. accuminata as subspecies websteri (S.Moore) Barlow ex Craven. The name, and that of the autonym are accepted by Plants of the World Online:

- Melaleuca acuminata F.Muell. subsp. acuminata occurs in Western Australia, South Australia, Victoria and the south–west of New South Wales.
- Melaleuca acuminata subsp. websteri (S.Moore) Barlow ex. Craven has narrower leaves, the flowers with a shorter hypanthium and is restricted to Western Australia. The subspecies name (websteri) honours Leonard Clarke Webster, an Australian botanical collector and later a doctor.

== Distribution and habitat ==
Mallee honeymyrtle occurs in Western Australia in the Carnarvon, Coolgardie, Avon Wheatbelt, Esperance, Jarrah Forest and Mallee biogeographic regions; in South Australia it is found in the far south-east corner of the state; in western Victoria, in the Murray Mallee, Lowan Mallee, Wimmera, Goldfields and Greater Grampians biozones, and in New South Wales it is rare and found only in the Balranald district. It grows in mallee communities on sandhills in New South Wales or elsewhere, in sandy or clayey soils in swampy depressions or rises, often in saline conditions.

== Conservation status ==
This species is classified as "not threatened" by the Government of Western Australia Department of Parks and Wildlife.

== Use in horticulture ==
This melaleuca is adaptable and easy to grow and when well supplied with water grows more vigorously than usually seen in the wild.

== See also ==
- List of Melaleuca species
