= Leonard Webster =

Leonard Webster may refer to:

- Lenny Webster (born 1965), baseballer
- Leonard Clarke Webster (1870–1942), Australian botanical collector
