= Maslin (disambiguation) =

Maslin is a surname.

Maslin may also refer to:

- Maslin Beach, South Australia
- Maslin, type of bread; see Rye bread#Multigrain
- Maslin Sham Razman, Malaysian politician
