= List of hoax commemorative plaques =

This is a list of hoax commemorative plaques on permanent public display in locations around the world.

== Europe ==
| Image | Title / subject | Location and coordinates | Date | Artist / designer | Type | Designation | Notes |
|---|---|---|---|---|---|---|---|
| | Angel Alley and Surrounds | Angel Alley, London, United Kingdom 51.515998°N 0.0705101°W | 2007 | Eames Demetrios | | | ANGEL ALLEY AND SURROUNDS A generation of generations ago, at the time of the Rockall Ascendancy, most of this area, owned by the Royal Family of distant Rockall, was a fiefdom of filth and wretchedness. It was here, searching for her sister, that the formidable Esther Tabran clearly saw Crown Prince Jyorge furtively step out of Georges Yard that lethal morning. Too late to save Martha, Esther’s unbridled and unrepentant outrage was a key link in the chain that left the once mighty empire a mere rump of rock accenting the sea. Discover Endlen Kymhuir. PLAQUE PLACED BY KYMAERICAPROJECT.CO.UK |
| | Raven Bjorn | 17/18 Catford Broadway, London, SE6, United Kingdom 51.445333°N 0.0218021°W | 2021 | Tara Tsuruta | | | Heritage of Catwanda RAVEN BJORN 1899 - 1934 Star of stage and screen lived here 1917 - 1922 |
| | Roger Bucklesby | Undisclosed park in North London, United Kingdom) Undisclosed | August 2013 | Jamie Maslin | | | In memory of Roger Bucklesby. Who hated this park, and everyone in it. |
| | Kilburn Chasm | Chatsworth Road, London, United Kingdom 51.546161°N 0.206227°W | September 2026 | JL | | | NW2's ancient and mysterious attraction. KILBURN CHASM. Fenced off for what feels like 100 years, no one knows how deep the chasm is or how long it has been here. Unlikely to be fixed this century. |
| | Katherine Ford | 17/18 Catford Broadway, London, SE6, United Kingdom 51.445333°N 0.0218021°W | 2021 | Tara Tsuruta | | | Heritage of Catwanda KATHERINE FORD 1900-1978 Actress and social reformer lived here 1917-1922 |
| | Jacob von Hogflume | multiple (Originally at 11 Golden Square, London, United Kingdom) 51.5113264°N 0.1376076°W | 2012 | Dave Askwith and Alex Normanton | | | English Heritage JACOB VON HOGFLUME 1864-1909 Inventor of time travel lived here in 2169 |
| | Llandegley International Airport | A44 road, between Crossgates and Cefnllys, United Kingdom 52.2742151°N 3.3265191°W | 2002 | Nicholas Whitehead | | | Llandegley International Terminals 1 and 3 For Airport Café, follow signs for Terminal 1. 2 1/2m |
| | Carswell Prentice | 118 Hillfield Ave, London, United Kingdom 51.584496°N 0.1182126°W | unknown | unknown | | | The Society for the Promotion of Historic Buildings Carswell Prentice 1891-1964 inventor of the supermarket trolley stayed here in September 1932 |
| | Father Pat Noise | O'Connell Bridge, Dublin, Ireland 53.347248°N 6.259447°W | Christmas 2004 | Two brothers from a village near Blessington | | | THIS PLAQUE COMMEMORATES FR. PAT NOISE ADVISOR TO PEADAR CLANCEY. HE DIED UNDER SUSPICIOUS CIRCUMSTANCES WHEN HIS CARRIAGE PLUNGED INTO THE LIFFEY ON AUGUST 10TH 1919. ERECTED BY THE HSTI |
| | Meteorite fall | Whitworth Park, Manchester, United Kingdom 53.458978°N 2.229936°W | 2015 | Cornelia Parker | | | METEOR FALL HERE IN THIS PARK ON THE NIGHT OF FRIDAY 13 FEBRUARY 2015 A METEORITE LANDED AND WAS LOST |
| | Armorial bearings of the unrecognized microstate of the Principality of Thomond | 5 Charlemont Street, Dublin, Republic of Ireland 53.3324487°N 6.2631978°W | 1949 | Raymond Moulton O'Brien | | | Irish (in Gaelic script): Laṁ láidir an Uaċtar (English: The Strong Hand from Above) |
| | Nothing | Multiple sites around the world (including behind the Connemara Giant statue at Glendollagh Lough in Recess, County Galway, Ireland) 53.466731°N 9.739157°W | 1980 (earliest reported date of same plaque in the United States) | unknown | | | ON THIS SITE IN 1897 NOTHING HAPPENED. |
| | Nothing | Multiple sites around the world (including Aspelt, Luxembourg) 49.526528°N 6.225306°E | unknown | unknown | | | ON THIS SITE SEPT. 5, 1782 NOTHING HAPPENED. |
| | Nothing | Bechyně, Czech Republic 49.2917674°N 14.4702616°E | unknown | unknown | | | Czech: Zde v tomto domě se nenarodil, nežil, ale hlavně nezemřel žádný významný člověk a proto se nám tady dobře žije. (English: In this house, no important person was born, lived, and most importantly did not die, and that is why we live well here) |
| | Nothing | Záblatí-Hlásná Lhota, Czech Republic 48.9816°N 13.9356°E | unknown | unknown | | | Czech: Hlásná Lhota – kámen, v jehož okolí se prokazatelně několik set let nic významného nestalo. (English: Hlásná Lhota – a stone in whose surroundings nothing significant has demonstrably happened for several hundred years) |
| | Jára Cimrman | Míšov, Czech Republic 49.61167°N 13.73528°E | unknown | unknown | | | Czech: Dne 8. 5. 1915 obec Míšov. Český génius světového významu Jára Cimrman těsně minul (English: On 8 May 1915 in Míšov, the great Czech genius Jára Cimrman just barely missed being involved in something historically important) |

== North America ==
| Image | Title / subject | Location and coordinates | Date | Artist / designer | Type | Designation | Notes |
|---|---|---|---|---|---|---|---|
| | Ry Brauer | High Falls, New York, United States 41.827222°N 74.123889°W | August 2013 | Norm Magnusson | | | ON THIS SITE STOOD RY BRAUER, TYPICAL AMERICAN TEEN, BY THE AGE OF 18, HE HAD WITNESSED OVER 30,000 MURDERS ON TV. (EDUCATION DEPARTMENT, 2007) |
| | Nothing | Multiple sites around the world (including O'Hungry's Café, Old Town San Diego State Historic Park, California, United States) 32.753171°N 117.195861°W | 1980 (earliest reported date of same plaque in the United States) | unknown | | | ON THIS SITE IN 1897 NOTHING HAPPENED. |

== Oceania ==
| Image | Title / subject | Location and coordinates | Date | Artist / designer | Type | Designation | Notes |
|---|---|---|---|---|---|---|---|
| | Nothing | Undisclosed location in York, Western Australia, Australia 31.888090°S 116.767800°E | 1980 (earliest reported date of same plaque in the United States) | unknown | | | ON THIS SITE IN 1897 NOTHING HAPPENED. |

== South America ==
| Image | Title / subject | Location and coordinates | Date | Artist / designer | Type | Designation | Notes |
|---|---|---|---|---|---|---|---|
| | Nothing and no-one | Carrera 9, Villa de Leyva, Boyacá Department, Colombia 5.634819°N 73.521492°W | unknown | unknown | | | El 13 de octubre de 1825 en esta casa no pasó nada, ni nació nadie importante (English: On October 13, 1825, nothing happened in this house, nor was anyone important born) |

== See also ==
- Anti-monumentalism (also: counter-monumentalism), a tendency in contemporary art that intentionally challenges every aspect (form, subject, meaning, etc) of traditional public monuments.
- Blue plaque, historical markers in the United Kingdom
- "Goo Goo Gai Pan", a 2005 episode of the TV series The Simpsons, in which the family visit China and walk past a plaque reading "TIEN AN MEN SQUARE: ON THIS SITE, IN 1989, NOTHING HAPPENED"
- List of hoaxes
