= Thomond (disambiguation) =

Thomond may also refer to:

- The Kingdom of Thomond, ruled by the Dal gCais
- The Principality of Thomond, a fictitious microstate
- Thomond College of Education, Limerick, a teacher training college
- Thomond Park, Limerick, a sports stadium of Munster Rugby
- Thomond Villas, old army barracks at Clarecastle
- Thomond Bridge, an old bridge across the River Shannon and its modern replacement
- Thomondgate, a district associated with Limerick
