= Maslen =

Maslen is a surname. Notable people with the surname include:

- Bill Maslen (1916–1974), Australian rules footballer
- Dudley Maslen (born 1948), Australian politician
- Riz Maslen, English electronic music artist
- Scott Maslen (born 1971), English actor and model

== See also ==
- Maslin
