= Millennium Clock, Dublin =

Coordinates: 53.347171°N 6.259616°W

Millennium Clock
- Year: 1996
- Medium: Installation art
- Location: Dublin, Ireland

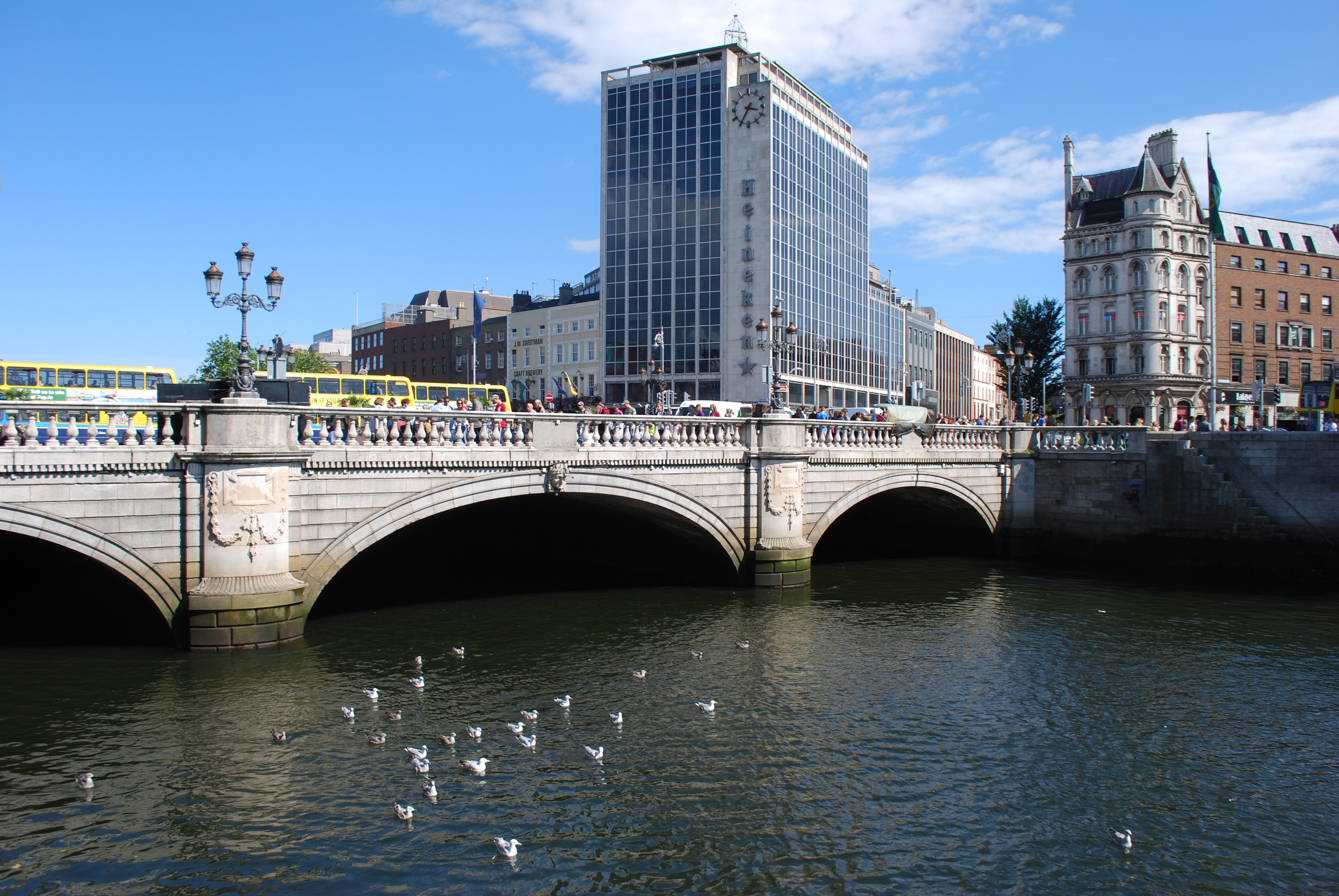
The west side of O'Connell Bridge in 2013, where the clock was installed

The Millennium Clock was a six-ton installation designed by Grainne Hassett and Vincent Ducatez to celebrate the passing of the millennium, sponsored by the National Lottery. It took the form of a digital seven-segment display counting down the number of seconds to the year 2000 submerged under the surface of the River Liffey on the west side of O'Connell Bridge in Dublin city centre. It was turned on in March 1996 but suffered from technical problems, including becoming obscured by mud and algae. It was ultimately removed in December of the same year. These issues resulted in the clock being referred to as the "Time in the Slime" or the "Chime in the Slime".

== History ==
The Dublin-based architects, Hassett and Ducatez, won the competition called "Countdown 2000" to design the clock in 1994. They won £10,000 for the design.

A ceremony featuring a fireworks display and led by the then Minister for Finance Ruairi Quinn marking the switching on of the clock was broadcast on RTE's The Late Late Show on Friday, 15 March 1996. The finished clock was 1.9 metres deep and 7.8 metres wide. It was temporarily removed three days later to facilitate boat races. The clock cost £250,000 to construct, with an additional £58,000 spent on repairs, installation and removal. During this period, when the clock was operational the countdown displayed was sometimes incorrect. The clock was finally removed in August 1996 for the annual Liffey swim and was removed completely in December 1996. The clock, which was damaged beyond repair, was broken up and sold for scrap.

A postcard dispenser machine was installed on the bridge as part of the installation which printed the number of seconds to the millennium on a postcard at a cost of 20p. It sold between 600-700 postcards per day in the five months of operation generating £17,000. An additional feature was a set of speakers which would play recorded noises of Dublin city at 30 second intervals.

The removal of the clock left a space in the bridge parapet where its control box had been. In 2004, pranksters took advantage of the space by installing a commemorative plaque memorialising the totally fictitious "Father Pat Noise".

== See also ==
- List of public art in Dublin
