= Norm Magnusson =

American artist (born 1960)

- Born: March 20, 1960 (age 66); Illinois, USA
- Education: Self-taught
- Known for: Painting, sculpture
- Movement: Culture jamming, Political art, Environmental art
- Awards: Pollock-Krasner Foundation grant, Lower Manhattan Cultural Council grant

Norm Magnusson (born March 20, 1960) is a Rhinebeck, NY based artist and political activist and founder, in 1991, of the art movement funism; he began his career creating allegorical animal paintings with pointed social commentaries. Eventually became more and more interested in political art and its potential for persuasion.

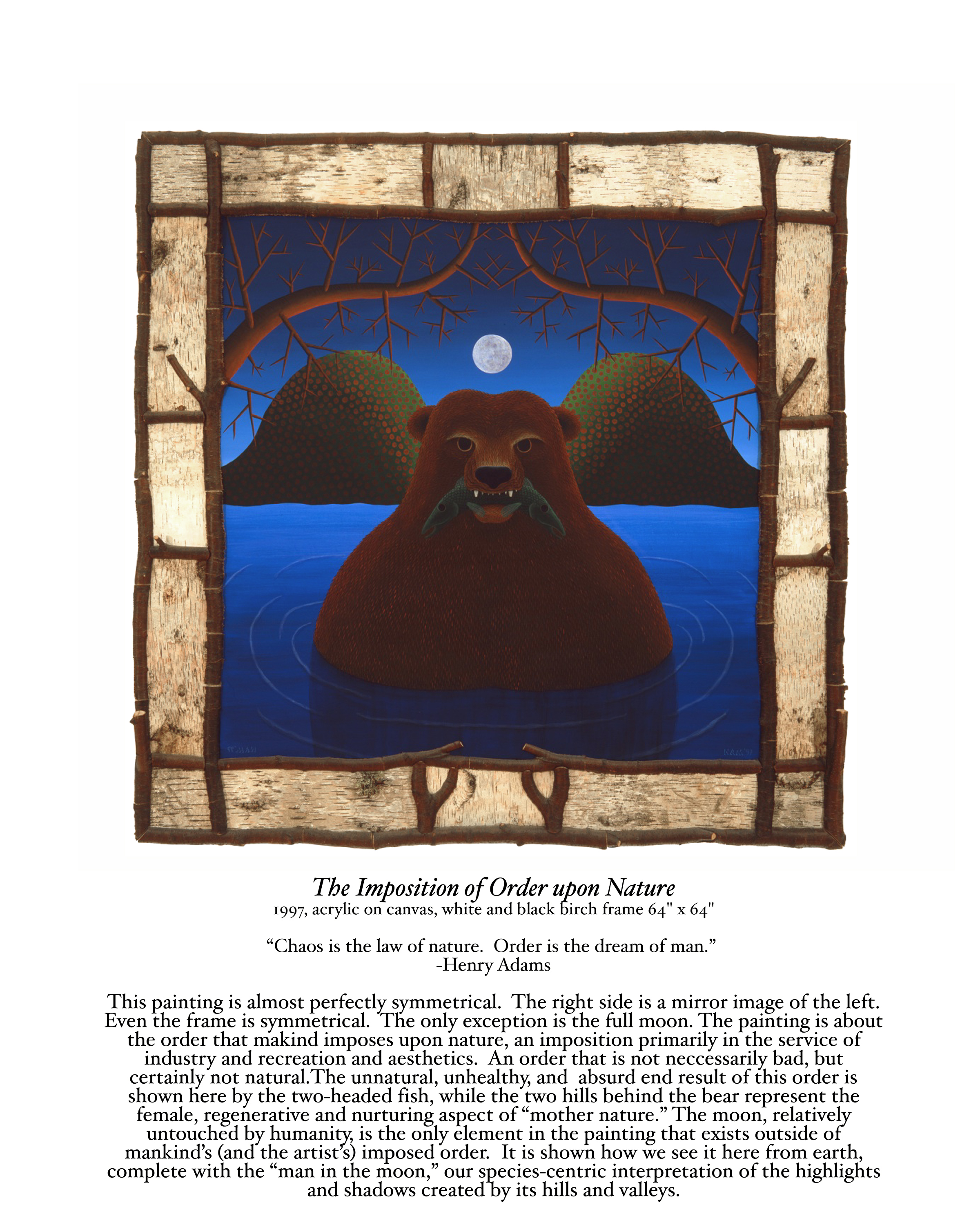
The Imposition of Order Upon Nature, a painting by Norm Magnusson

This led him away from the canvas and into the public realm where he created short videos that ran on U.S. national television prior to 2004's U.S. general election, viral emails and roadside historical markers with contemporary social content. The markers are part of the artist's proposed "New York State Thruway Project". Scheduled for 2012, it will place one marker in each of the 27 rest areas up and down the length of the NYS Thruway.

In the permanent collection of The Museum of Modern Art (Franklin Furnace Artist's Book Archive), The Springfield Museum of Art, The Anchorage Museum of History and Art, The Museum of the City of New York Museum of the City of New York, The New-York Historical Society New-York Historical Society, The Samuel Dorsky Museum of Art, The Pember Museum and numerous other public and private collections; he has exhibited at these museums and for many years before it closed, at the infamous East Village-born Bridgewater/Lustberg Gallery in NYC. His sculptures of historical markers were shown as the Aldrich Contemporary Art Museum's 2007 Main Street Sculpture Project, a show entitled "On this site stood." In his review of that exhibition for The New York Times, Ben Gennochio called Magnusson "The Michael Moore of the highways" for the very liberal "unsparing and pitiless candor" of his art, which focuses "our attention on pressing contemporary social and political issues."

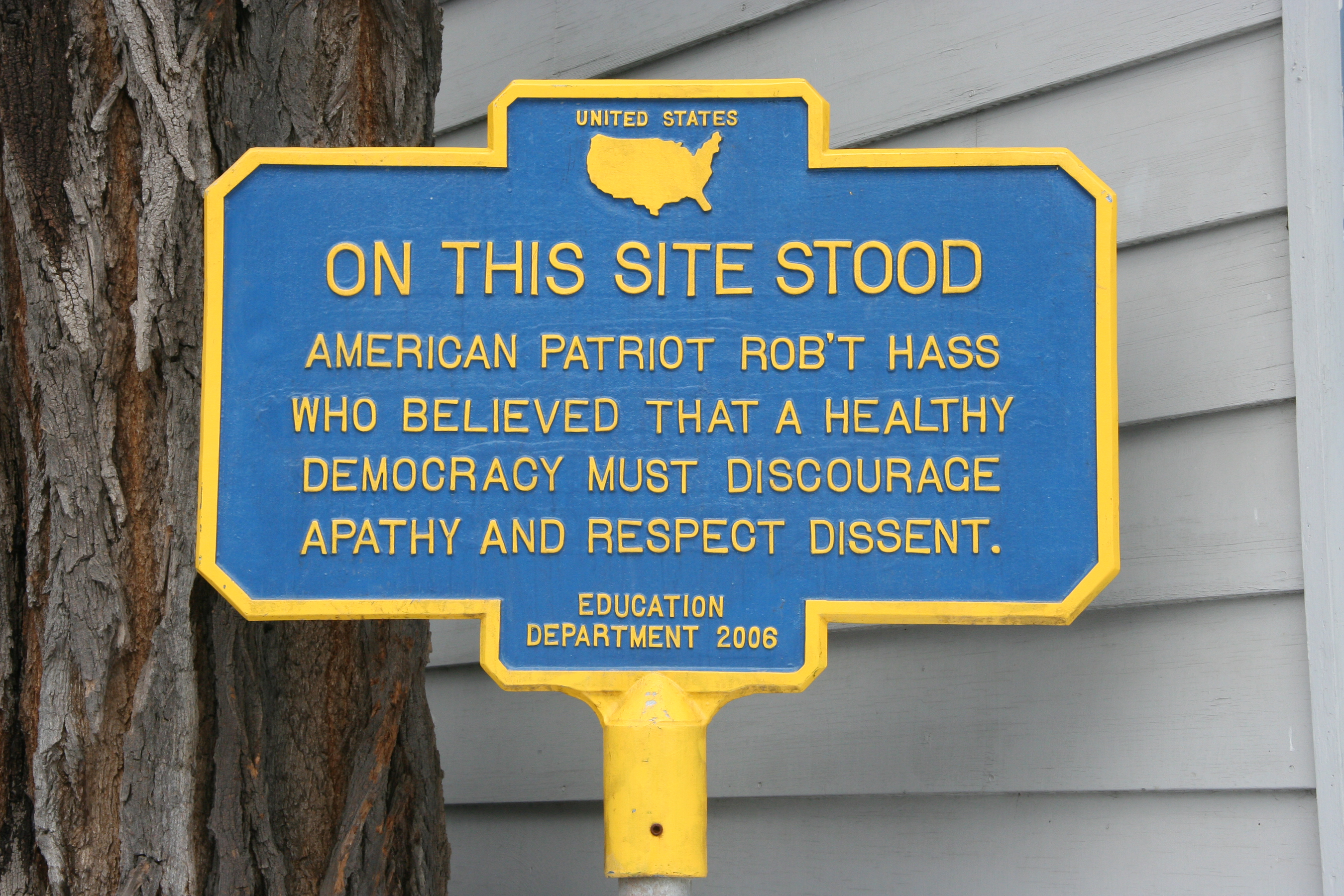
Rob't Hass, a sculpture by Norm Magnusson from his I-75 Project.

He has also created a body of nature-based work entitled "Decorating nature" in which he paints on rocks and leaves and trees and photographs them in their environment.

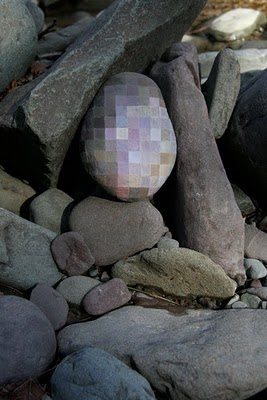
One of Magnusson's "Decorating nature" series. , 2007

He was honored with two Pollock-Krasner Foundation grants (in 2016-2017 for sculpture and in 1998-1999 for painting) and a grant from the Lower Manhattan Cultural Council in 2008 for the realization of "On this site stood - lower Manhattan" a project to put 'historical' plaques with contemporary social content around lower Manhattan in summer 2009. (link below) In 2014, he received a NYSCA grant (through the Center for Sustainable Rural Communities) for a public art installation in Schoharie County, NY. In 2015, he was awarded a NYFA fellowship for sculpture.

He has acted in numerous feature length and short films (see imdb.com page below, in "References" section) and is currently the host of "Correct Me if I'm Norm", a once a week internet radio interview program on RadioFreeRhinecliff.org.

== See also ==
- List of hoax commemorative plaques
- The Talk page for the Wikipedia listing of historical markers in Ulster County, NY has images and the locations of some of his satirical historical markers located in that county.
