= Llandegley International Airport =

Welsh hoax airport signage

Coordinates: 52.274237°N 3.326590°W

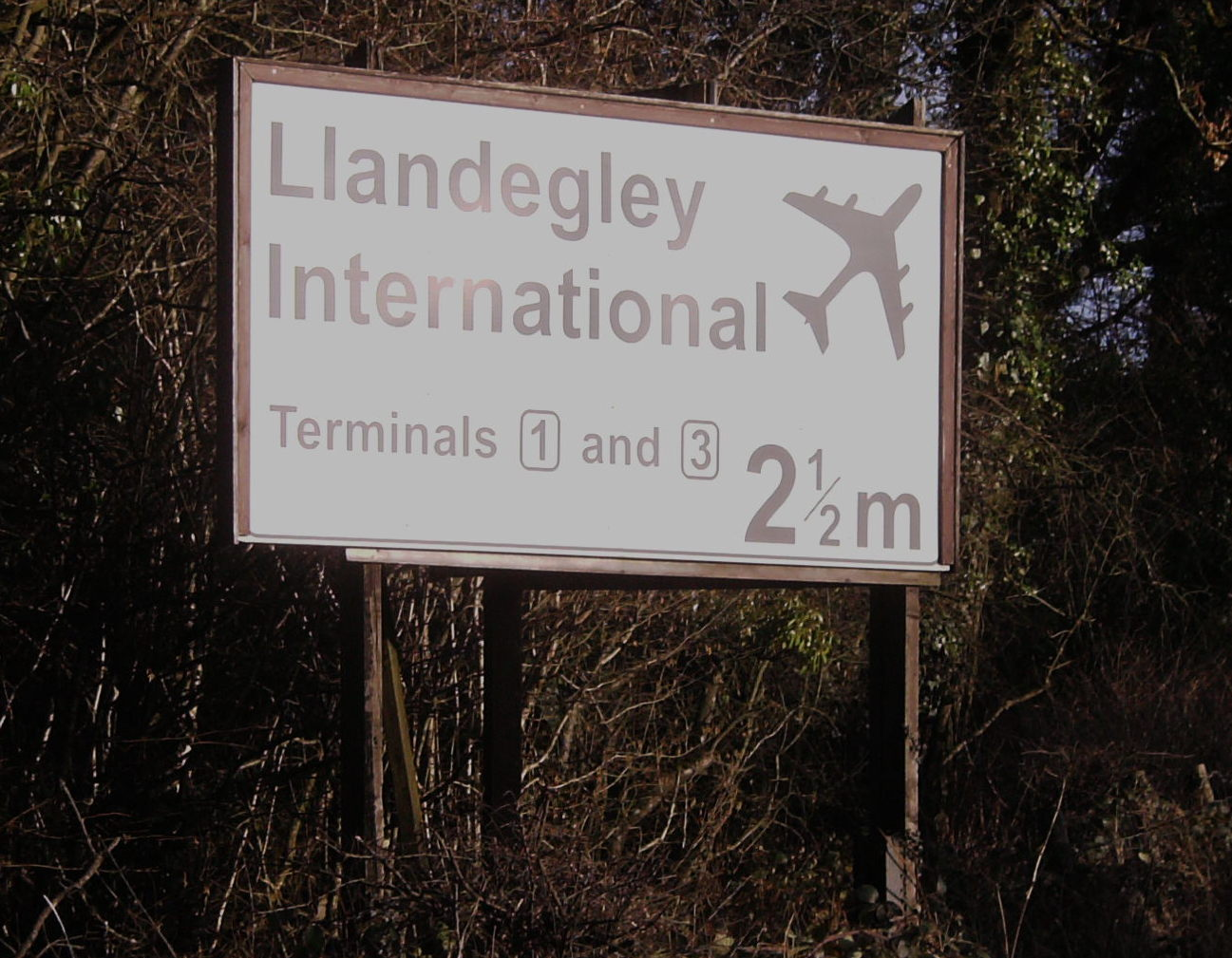
Sign, next to the A44, seen in January 2014

Llandegley International Airport is a spoof located in the village of Llandegley (Welsh: Llandeglau), near Llandrindod Wells, in mid-Wales. No such airport exists, but a sign, erected as a practical joke, announces a forthcoming turn off to it.

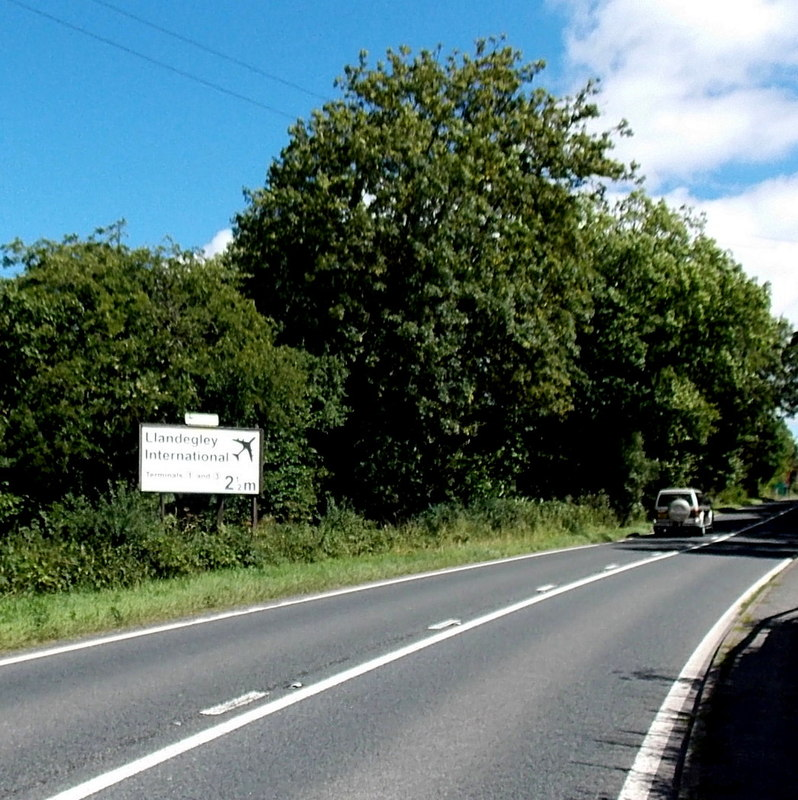
Sign and A44, seen in August 2013

Despite Llandegley having no airfield—much less one of international standard—a visitor to Llandegley, Nicholas Whitehead, erected his own road sign, mimicking the UK's standard Worboys signs, on private land on the north side of the A44 east of Crossgates in 2002, showing "Llandegley International [Airport] / Terminals 1 & 3 / 2½ m". He spent £1,000 on renting the site.

The original sign was removed in November 2009, but replaced in 2010 following public outcry. It was replaced again in April 2012. The version of the sign visible on Google Street View imagery, captured in April 2021, has the added wording "For Airport Cafe, follow signs for Terminal 1", and a fly posted "No 2 Runway 2" notice."

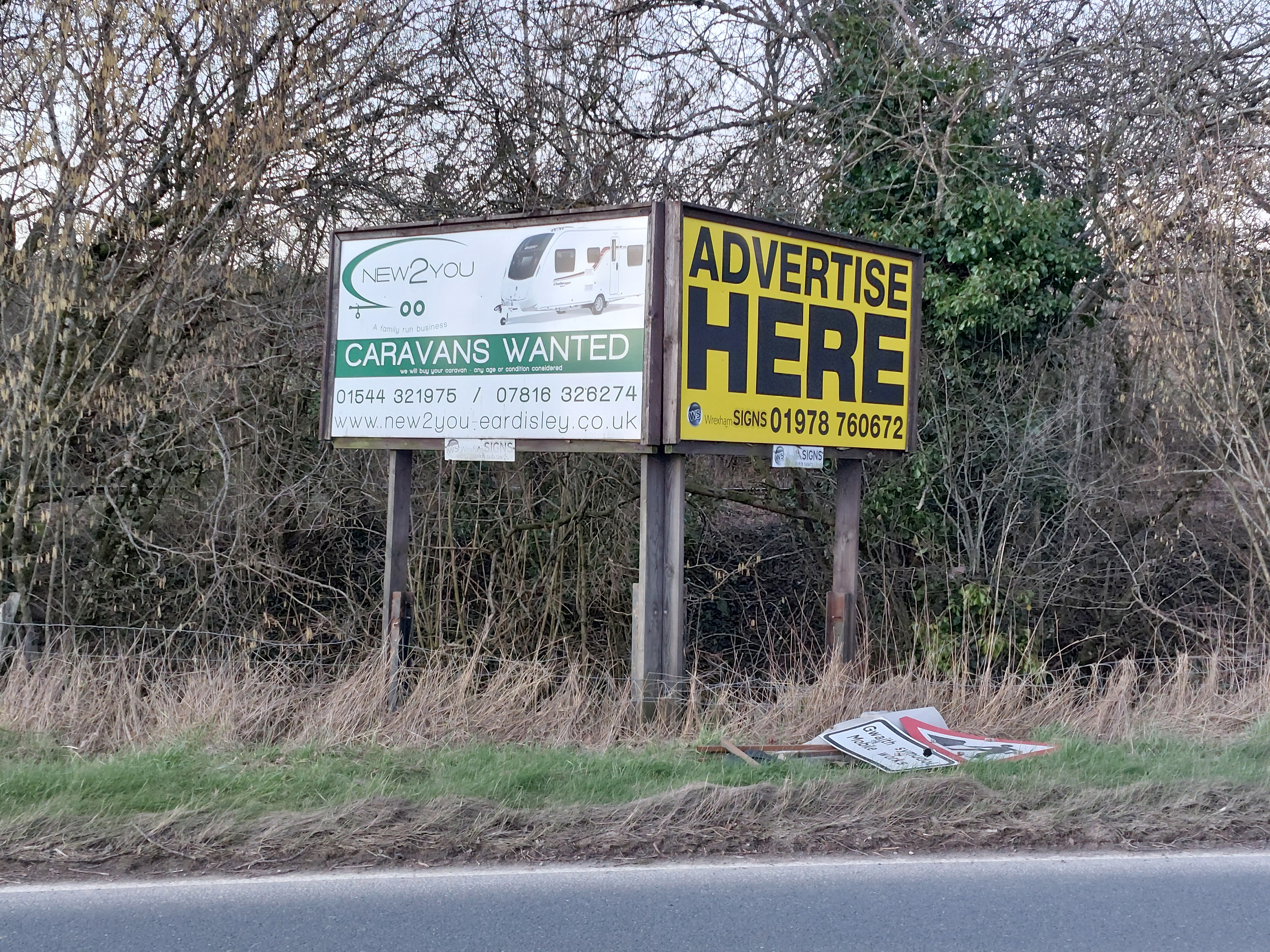
Sign occupying the site in 2025.

The sign has attracted press and television coverage and was mentioned in the United Kingdom Parliament in 2003 by Roger Williams, the member for Brecon and Radnorshire.

The sign is listed in the Welsh Government's National Monuments Record database, Coflein.

A Twitter account, @llandegley_int, has operated in the name of the airport since 2018, and the airport has a Facebook page.

In November 2022, the owner decided to end his commitment to the sign, explaining it had cost him a total of over £25,000 to date. He expressed the hope that the Welsh Government's heritage body, Cadw, might be interested in funding it in the future as a cultural landmark.

After a crowdfunding campaign, in May 2023 a new sign was erected east of the village, where the landowner will allow it to remain without cost.

== See also ==
- List of hoaxes
- List of hoax commemorative plaques
