= Llandegley =

Llandegley Llandeglau
- Village
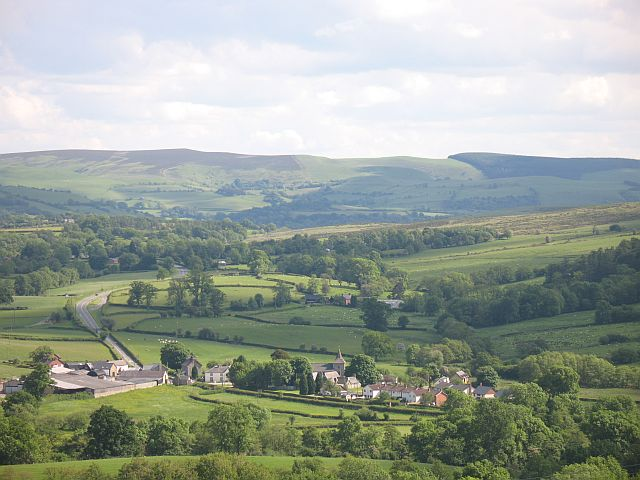
- Llandegley in 2008, seen from The Pales, with the moors of the southern Radnor Forest in the background;
- Interactive map of Llandegley
- Coordinates: 52.257139°N 3.260539°W
- Country: Wales
- County: Powys
- Time zone: UTC

Llandegley (Welsh: Llandeglau), is a village near Llandrindod Wells, in the community of Penybont, in Powys, mid Wales, United Kingdom. It is the supposed location of the spoof Llandegley International Airport.

Llandegley lies 53.8 miles (86.6 km) from Cardiff and 143.3 miles (230.6 km) from London.

This area is represented in the Senedd by James Evans (Conservative) and in the United Kingdom Parliament by David Chadwick (Liberal Democrats).

Until 1983 Llandegley was a community.
