= Acacia effusifolia =

Scientific classification
- Kingdom: Plantae
- Clade: Tracheophytes
- Clade: Angiosperms
- Clade: Eudicots
- Clade: Rosids
- Order: Fabales
- Family: Fabaceae
- Subfamily: Caesalpinioideae
- Clade: Mimosoid clade
- Genus: Acacia
- Species: A. effusifolia

Binomial name
- Acacia effusifolia Maslin & Buscumb
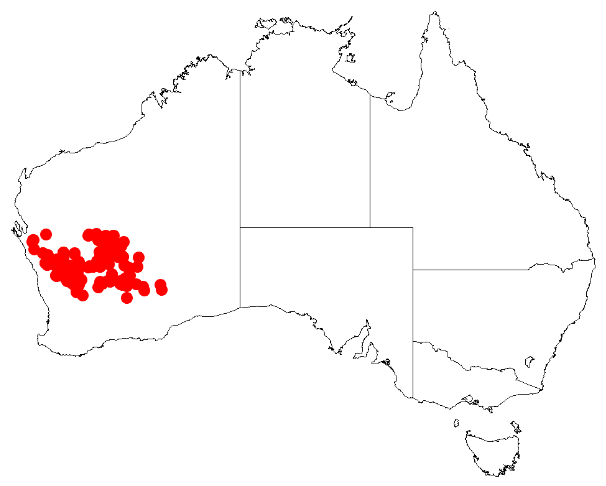
- Occurrence data from AVH

Synonyms
- Acacia coolgardiensis subsp. effusa R.S.Cowan & Maslin; Racosperma coolgardiense subsp. effusum (R.S.Cowan & Maslin) Pedley

Species of legume

Acacia effusifolia is a species of flowering plant in the family Fabaceae and is endemic to Western Australia. It is a shrub or tree with smooth bark, narrowly linear phyllodes, oblong to cylindrical heads of golden yellow flowers, and terete, straight to slightly curved pods.

== Description ==
Acacia effusifolia is a shrub or tree that typically grows to a height of 2–5 m (6 ft 7 in – 16 ft 5 in) and has stems with longitudinal flutings and usually smooth bark. The phyllodes are narrowly linear, flat and straight or slightly curved, 60–100 mm (2.4–3.9 in) long and 1.5–3 mm (0.059–0.118 in) wide, grey-green or glaucous, sometimes with minute hairs pressed against the surface between many fine veins. The flowers are borne in one or two oblong to cylindrical heads in axils on peduncles 1–6 mm (0.039–0.236 in) long, densely covered with silvery white hairs pressed against the surface and red-brown glandular hairs. The heads are 5–15 mm (0.20–0.59 in) long and 4–7 mm (0.16–0.28 in) in diameter with golden yellow flowers. Flowering occurs between July and September and the pods are terete, straight to slightly curved, 30–70 mm (1.2–2.8 in) long, 4–7 mm (0.16–0.28 in) in diameter and thinly leathery to crusty with more or less obscure longitudinal veins. The seeds are oblong, 3–4 mm (0.12–0.16 in) long and shiny brown with a white aril.

== Taxonomy ==
This species was first formally described in 1995 by Richard Cowan and Bruce Maslin who gave it the name Acacia coolgardiensis subsp. effusa in the journal Nuytsia from specimens collected by Maslin 17.5 km (10.9 mi) south-east of Mullewa towards Morawa in 1973. In 2008, Bruce Maslin and Carrie Buscomb raised it to species status as Acacia effusifolia in a later edition of Nuytsia. The specific epithet (effusifolia) means 'expanded leaves', referring to the flat phyllodes which distinguish the species from A. coolgardiensis which has terete phyllodes.

== Distribution and habitat ==
This wattle is widespread from around Mullewa to Cleary (about 100 km (62 mi) east of Dalwallinu), north-east to Meekatharra and Barwidgee Station and east to Lake Goongarrie with several outlying populations, in the Avon Wheatbelt, Coolgardie, Geraldton Sandplains, Great Victoria Desert, Murchison and Yalgoo bioregions of Western Australia. It usually grows on low hills, around granite outcrops, flats and sandplains in sandy or loamy soils that can contain a substantial amount of clay, in shrubland and spinifex communities that usually contain a number of Eucalyptus and other Acacia species.

== Conservation status ==
Acacia effusifolia is listed as "not threatened" by the Government of Western Australia Department of Biodiversity, Conservation and Attractions.

== See also ==
- List of Acacia species
