= Whitworth Park =

Public park in south Manchester, England

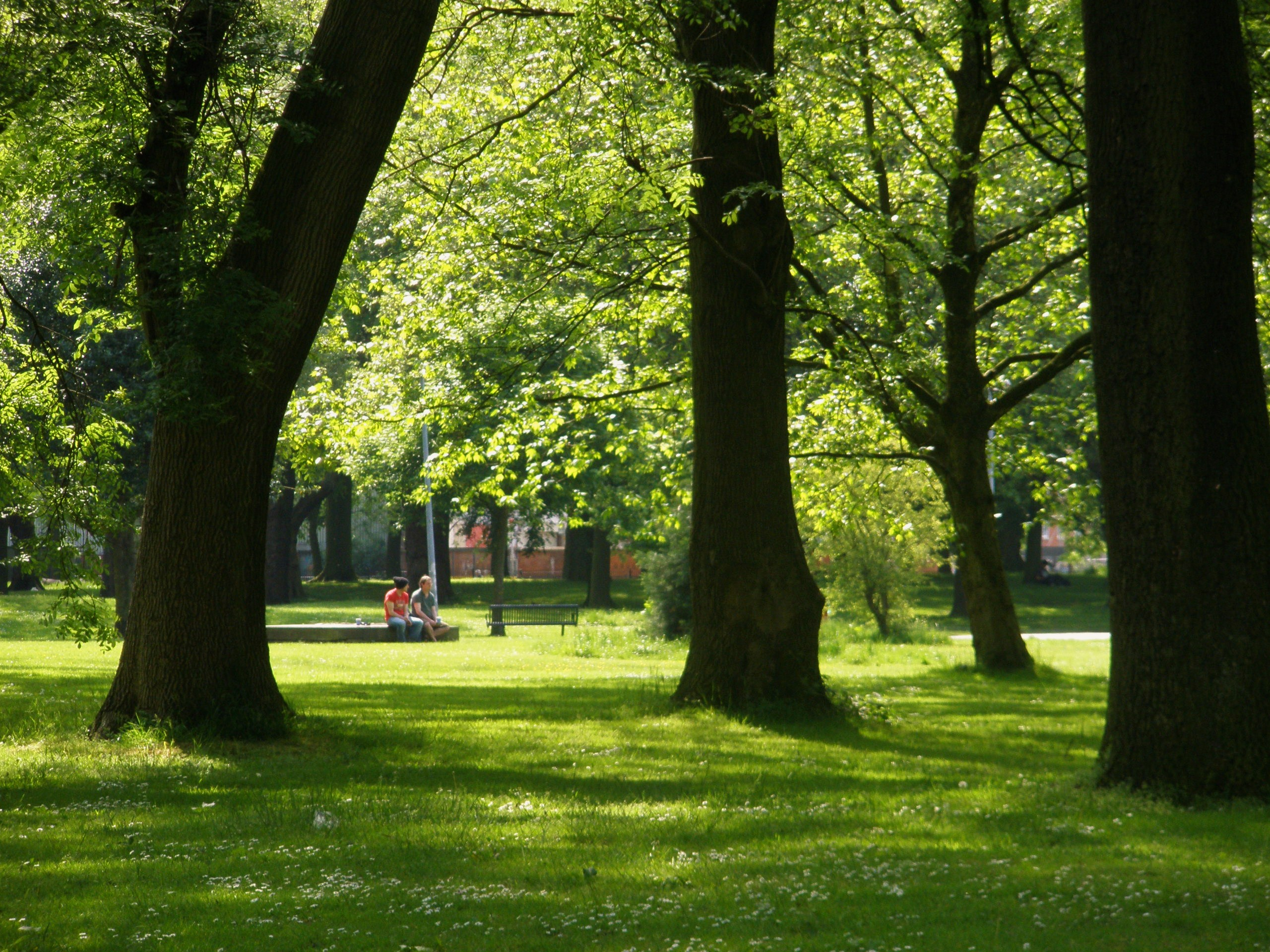
- Whitworth Park
- Interactive map of Whitworth Park
- Type: Municipal park
- Location: Rusholme, Manchester, England
- Coordinates: 53.45877°N 2.23002°W
- Area: 18 acres (7.3 ha)
- Created: 1890
- Operator: Manchester City Council

Whitworth Park is a public park in south Manchester, England, and the location of the Whitworth Art Gallery. To the north are the University of Manchester's student residences known as "Toblerones". It was historically in Chorlton on Medlock but is now included in the Moss Side ward.

The park, of some 18 acres (7.3 ha) opposite Manchester Royal Infirmary, was opened in 1890 on land known as Potters Field. The park was leased to the Corporation of Manchester by the Whitworth Trustees in October 1904 on a 1000-year lease for a nominal annual rent of £10.

A statue of King Edward VII by John Cassidy on the east side, unveiled in 1913, commemorates the royal visit when the new Royal Infirmary was opened in 1909. The bronze statue, mounted on a square, stepped granite plinth and pedestal, is a grade II listed structure.

A sign in the park referring to a meteor that fell on the night of Friday 13 February 2015, and was lost, is a hoax commemorative plaque by artist Cornelia Parker which actually refers to 'Blakeian Abstract', one of her artworks which was specifically created for the Whitworth Art Gallery's February 2015 opening.

== Fauna ==
Amongst the birdlife to have been spotted in the park are the goldfinch, greenfinch, ring necked parakeet, fieldfare, redwing and waxwing. Concerns have been raised as to whether feral parakeets in Great Britain are an invasive species causing harm to native wildlife.

== See also ==
- List of hoax commemorative plaques
