= Fr. Pat Noise plaque =

Plaque about a fictitious priest

Coordinates: 53°20′50″N 6°15′34″W

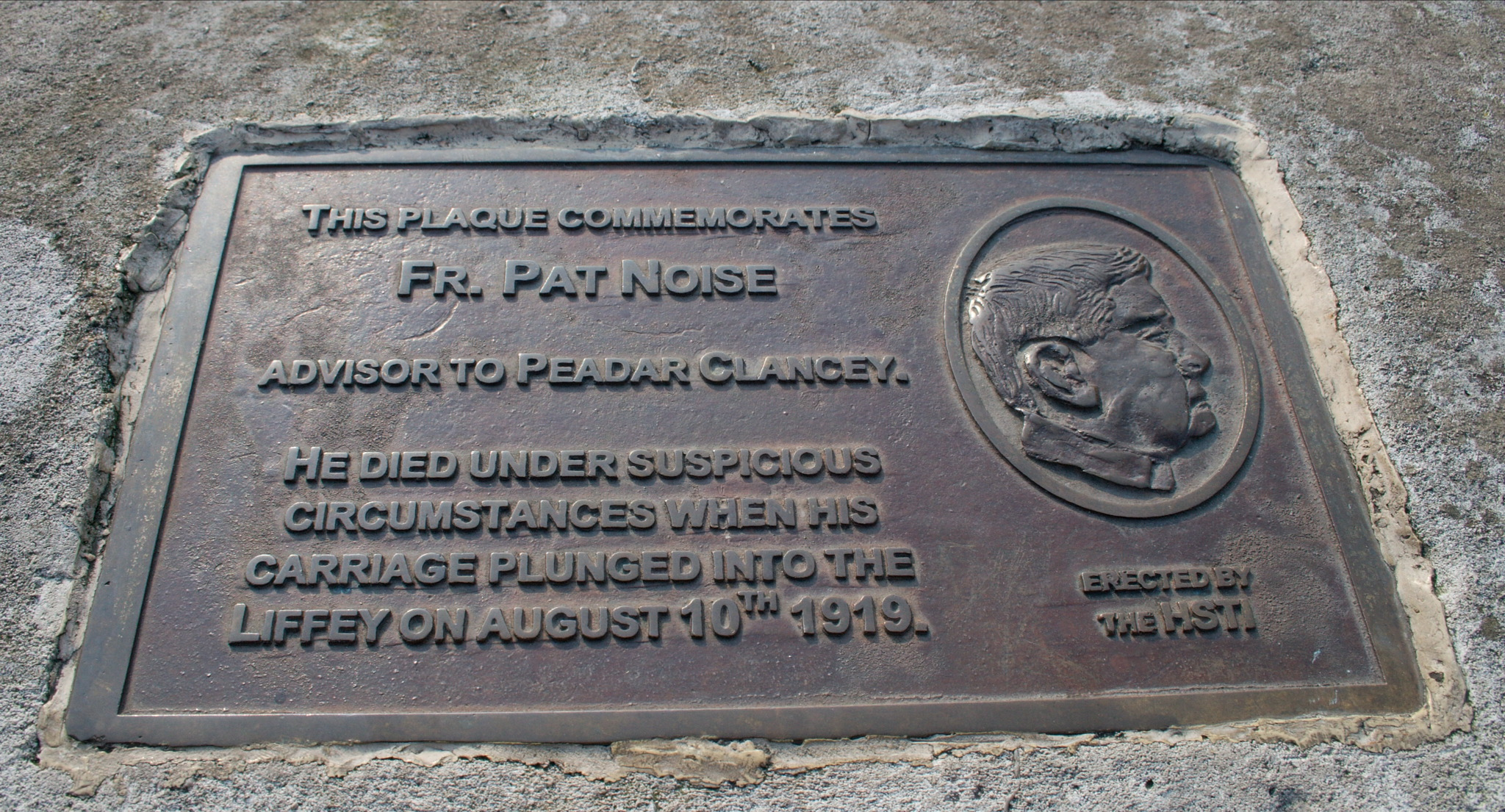
Plaque in memory of the fictional Father Pat Noise

The Fr. Pat Noise plaque is a hoax commemorative plaque installed by two brothers on the balustrade of O'Connell Bridge over the River Liffey in Dublin, Ireland. It is about a fictitious Roman Catholic priest named Father Pat Noise.

The full text of the plaque reads:

THIS PLAQUE COMMEMORATES
FR. PAT NOISE
ADVISOR TO PEADAR CLANCEY.
HE DIED UNDER SUSPICIOUS
CIRCUMSTANCES WHEN HIS
CARRIAGE PLUNGED INTO THE
LIFFEY ON AUGUST 10TH, 1919.

ERECTED BY THE HSTI

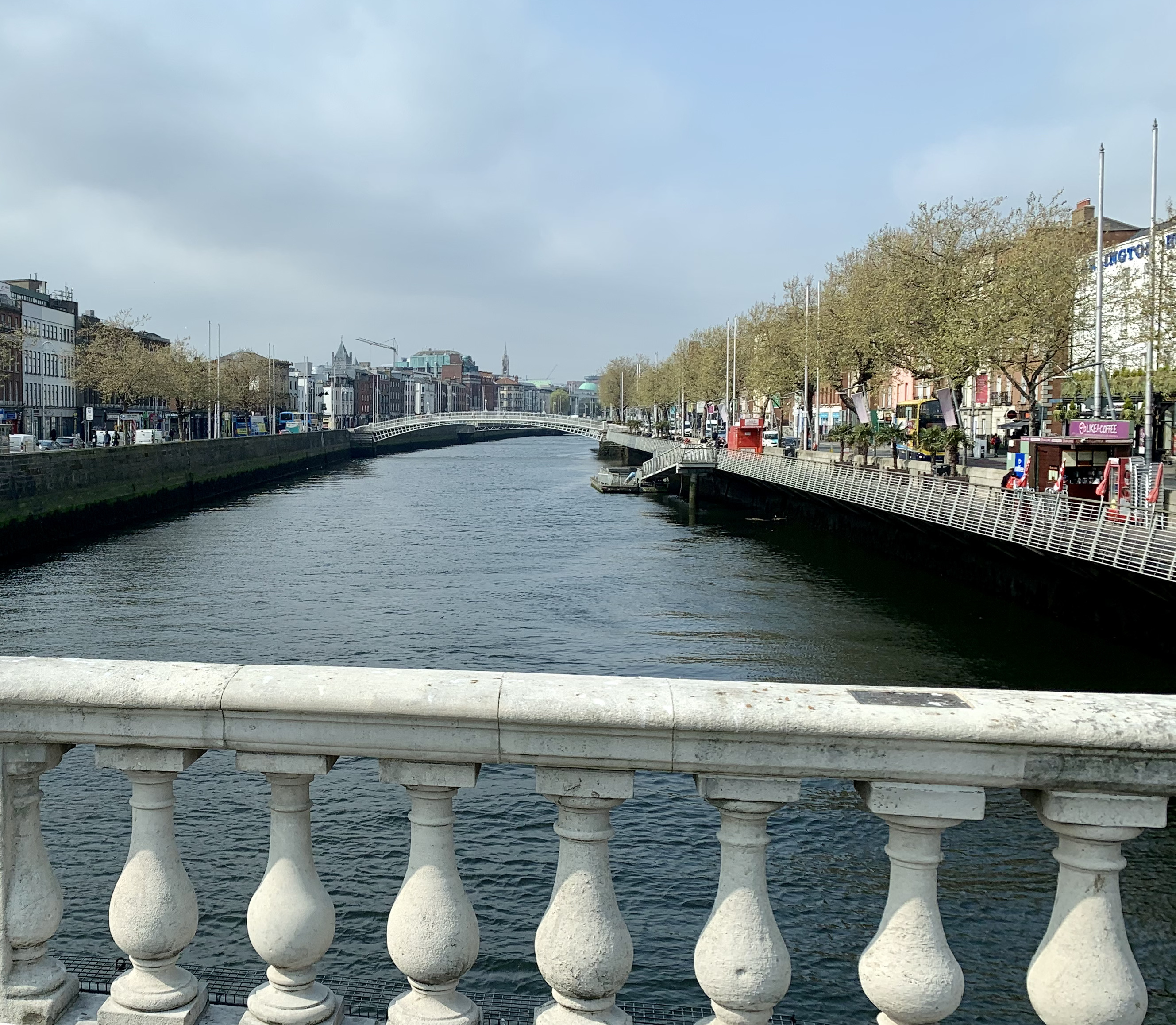
The plaque is on the top of the balustrade on the west side of O'Connell Bridge.

The bronze plaque had been professionally sand cast using materials and techniques estimated at a value of about €1,000 ($US1256) to produce. Only a few foundries in the Dublin area had the equipment and skill necessary to produce such an artefact.

Two men who claimed to be the hoaxers said they installed it in 2004, and owned up in May 2006 after the plaque was brought to the attention of Dublin City Council by a journalist for the Sunday Tribune. They provided video footage that appeared to show them installing it in April 2004. They claimed the work was a tribute to their father, and that the name 'Father Pat Noise' is a word play on pater noster, Latin for "our father". The 'HSTI' is also fictitious, and could be an anagram of the word "shit". Peadar Clancy (misspelled on the plaque) was a genuine Irish Republican Army officer killed on the evening of Bloody Sunday, 1920. The men did not reveal their exact identities; instead communicated only by anonymous correspondence.

The plaque was laid in a depression left by the removal of the control box for the "Millennium Countdown" clock, installed in the waters of the River Liffey in March 1996 as a countdown to the year 2000. The clock and control box were removed in December 1996 after persistent technical and visibility problems. Dublin City Council stated when the story broke that the Pat Noise plaque would be removed, as it was unauthorised. Several ironic tributes of flowers and messages were left at the plaque. A meeting of the South East Area Committee of the Council in December 2006 supported leaving it in place. However, the plaque was removed in March 2007 during restoration work on the Bridge. A second plaque was installed, again surreptitiously, some time later. On 22 May 2007, Dublin City Council engineers intended to remove the plaque, but were stopped by City Councillor Dermot Lacey, who insisted the Council's order not to remove it should apply to the new plaque.

Eoin Dillon's 2011 album The Golden Mean includes "Lament for Fr. Pat Noise".

== See also ==
- List of hoax commemorative plaques
