= Acacia latior =

Scientific classification
- Kingdom: Plantae
- Clade: Embryophytes
- Clade: Tracheophytes
- Clade: Spermatophytes
- Clade: Angiosperms
- Clade: Eudicots
- Clade: Rosids
- Order: Fabales
- Family: Fabaceae
- Subfamily: Caesalpinioideae
- Clade: Mimosoid clade
- Genus: Acacia
- Species: A. latior

Binomial name
- Acacia latior (R.S.Cowan & Maslin) Maslin & Buscumb
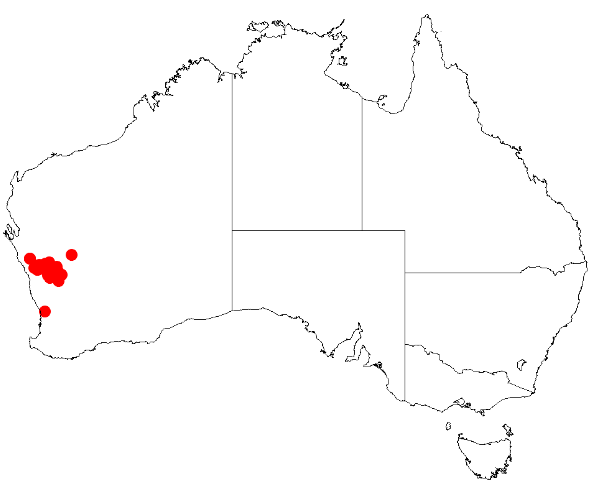
- Occurrence data from AVH

Synonyms
- Acacia coolgardiensis subsp. latior R.S.Cowan & Maslin; Racosperma coolgardiense subsp. latius (R.S.Cowan & Maslin) Pedley

Species of legume

Acacia latior, commonly known as broad-leaf sugar brother, is a species of flowering plant in the family Fabaceae and is endemic to the south-west of Western Australia. It is a multi-stemmed shrub, with narrowly lance-shaped to linear phyllodes, heads of golden yellow flowers and terete, leathery pods.

== Description ==
Acacia latior is a rounded or inverted cone-shaped shrub, usually with many stems, that typically grows to a height of 1–4 m (3 ft 3 in – 13 ft 1 in) and has sparingly fluted stems and a dense, compact crown. Its new shoots are densely covered with silvery white hairs pressed against the surface and the bark is smooth or finely fissured. The phyllodes are narrowly lance-shaped with the narrower end towards the base, or linear, straight to slightly curved, 50–110 mm (2.0–4.3 in) long, mostly 5–8 mm (0.20–0.31 in) wide with a distinctive silvery sheen, especially on young phyllodes. The flowers are usually borne in two elliptic to oblong or short cylindrical heads 8–12 mm (0.31–0.47 in) long, 5–7 mm (0.20–0.28 in) in diameter in axils on hairy peduncles 3–7 mm (0.12–0.28 in) long. Flowering mostly occurs from July to September, and the pods are terete, straight to slightly curved, 20–50 mm (0.79–1.97 in) long and thinly to moderately leathery with soft hairs pressed against the surface. The seeds are oblong, mostly 2.0–2.5 mm (0.079–0.098 in) long and shiny light or dark brown with a white aril.

== Taxonomy ==
This taxon was first formally described in 1995 by Richard Cowan and Bruce Maslin and given the name Acacia coolgardiensis subsp. latior in the journal Nuytsia from specimens collected by Maslin 6.4 km (4.0 mi) east of Mullewa towards Yalgoo in 1974. In a later edition of the same journal, Maslin and Carrie Buscumb raised the subspecies to species status as A. latior. The specific epithet (latior) means 'broader', because the phyllodes of the originally described subspecies are wider than those of the other subspecies of Acacia coolgardiensis.

== Distribution and habitat ==
Broad-leaf sugar brother grows in gently undulating country in shrubland in often gravelly sand or sandy loam around Mullewa and in open woodland in heavier loam or clay loam in nearby areas, in the Avon Wheatbelt, Geraldton Sandplains, Murchison and Yalgoo bioregions of south-western Western Australia.

== Conservation status ==
Acacia latior is listed as 'not threatened' by the Government of Western Australia Department of Biodiversity, Conservation and Attractions.

== See also ==
- List of Acacia species
