= Leonard Clarke Webster =

Leonard Clarke Webster (1870 – 26 September 1942) was a botanical collector in Australia.

Born in Launceston, Tasmania, his first occupation was as a pharmacist. By 1900 he was living in the vicinity of Kalgoorlie, Western Australia. Between 1903 and 1938, he sold plant and reptile specimens to the British Museum and the Australian Museum. He collected the types of Eucalyptus websteriana (Webster's mallee), later named in his honour, and Acacia coolgardiensis (spinifex wattle). In 1906 he qualified as a doctor, thereafter practicing medicine in Tasmania and New South Wales.

Webster died at West Maitland in 1942.
