= Irish Monarchist Society =

The Irish Monarchist Society (Irish: Cumann Monarcach na hÉireann) was a minor organisation active in the 1930s which sought to overthrow the Irish Free State and establish an independent Irish Catholic monarchy under a member of the O'Neill dynasty.
