= Jamie Maslin =

British author and adventurer

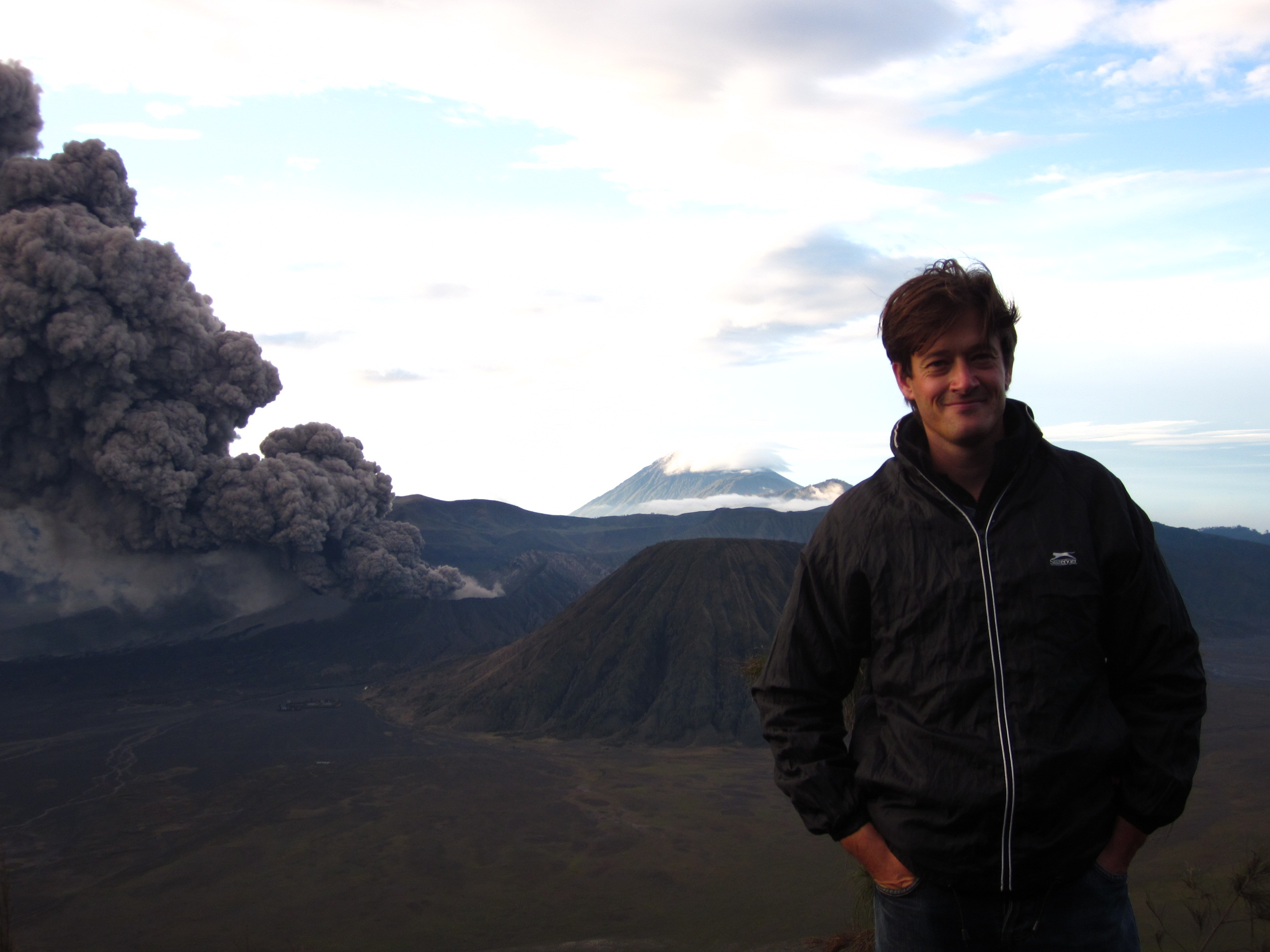
- Jamie Maslin, Mt Bromo, Indonesia (2011)

Jamie Maslin is a British author, adventurer and bushcraft survival instructor. He is best known for his travel memoirs: Iranian Rappers & Persian Porn: A Hitchhiker's Adventures in the New Iran (Skyhorse Publishing, 2009), Socialist Dreams & Beauty Queens: A Couchsurfer's Memoir of Venezuela (Skyhorse Publishing, 2011), and The Long Hitch Home, (Skyhorse Publishing, 2015).

== Books ==
Maslin's first book, Iranian Rappers & Persian Porn: A Hitchhiker's Adventures in the New Iran, chronicled his journey hitchhiking from England to Iran and subsequent travels around the Islamic republic. The book was controversial for its portrayal of some of the less than Islamic aspects of Iranian youth culture, which Maslin both witnessed and participated in. These included getting drunk on surgical spirit (96% ethanol), attending illegal parties where there wasn't a compulsory hejab headscarf in sight, and even viewing hardcore porn films with a group of anti establishment students. As a result, Maslin has been banned from re-entering the country.

Maslin's second book, Socialist Dreams and Beauty Queens: A Couchsurfer's Memoir of Venezuela, is part travel memoir, part political thesis. The travelogue details Maslin's experiences using CouchSurfing in Venezuela. Politically, the book explores the policies of Venezuelan president Hugo Chavez and the impact organisations such as the International Monetary Fund and World Bank have had on Venezuela and Latin America in general.

Maslin's third book, The Long Hitch Home, details an eighteen thousand mile hitchhiking trip he made, travelling over land and sea, from Australia to England. The journey took him across three continents and through nineteen countries: Australia, Indonesia, Malaysia, Thailand, Laos, China, Kyrgyzstan, Kazakhstan, Azerbaijan, Georgia, Turkey, Bulgaria, Croatia, Serbia, Slovenia, Austria, Germany, France, and England. It took Maslin over 800 hitchhiking rides to complete his journey.

== Bushcraft ==
Maslin is a former senior instructor for the British Bushcraft School, and inventor of a new method of creating fire by friction, The Maslin Leg Drill, that enables a person to create fire by friction using only one arm—theoretically making it possible to do with a broken arm.

== Publications ==
- Iranian Rappers and Persian Porn, published by Skyhorse Publishing in 2009 (ISBN 978-1602397910)
- Socialist Dreams and Beauty Queens, published by Skyhorse Publishing in 2011 (ISBN 978-1616082215)
- The Long Hitch Home, published by Skyhorse Publishing in 2015 (ISBN 978-1620878316)

== Reaction ==
Maslin's books have received some critical acclaim.

William Blum wrote approvingly of Socialist Dreams & Beauty Queens: A Couchsurfer's Memoir of Venezuela:

"Jamie Maslin has put together an exciting mix of progressive politics and adventurous travelogue. Making his way through Venezuela, Maslin visits slums and country clubs, rainforests and Caribbean beaches, while coping with anti-Chavistas and the country's ubiquitous criminals, and learning why Hugo Chávez has so many loyal followers. A welcome antidote to the common mainstream media distortions peddled against Venezuela."

Commenting on Iranian Rappers & Persian Porn: A Hitchhiker's Adventures in the New Iran Cindy Sheehan wrote:

"In a time where an understanding of different cultures is more important than ever, I’m so glad we have books like Jamie Maslin’s. Both informative and entertaining, Maslin paints a picture of Iran in stark contrast to the caricature one fed to us by the mainstream media. A riveting, off-the-beaten-track tale of adventure and self-discovery that can't fail to provide new insight on a country unfairly demonized in the West."

In 2009 Simon Van Booy described Maslin's writing as:

"Bill Bryson meets Jack Kerouac."

In 2011 Daily Kos also invoked Jack Kerouac, commenting that:

"Jamie Maslin is cool – and he has adventures far beyond anything Jack Kerouac could ever dream of."

== Internet memes ==
- The Roger Bucklesby Bench Plaque – In the middle of August 2013, Maslin reportedly installed this plaque in a London park to his fictional character Roger Bucklesby – a misanthropic failed author. The bench plaque reads, "In memory of Roger Bucklesby. Who hated this park, and everyone in it." The image was originally posted on a Twitter account under the description "I was walking through London and came across this bench" and within hours its image went viral, receiving over 2 million views on image sharing website Imgur, thousands of retweets and over half a million likes on Facebook with ten thousand corresponding comments. "We had no plans for this to turn into an internet hit" said Maslin, "we just hoped the occasional passerby would see it and have a giggle. It seems we've done plenty of that."

== See also ==
- List of hoax commemorative plaques
