= Bill Maslen =

Australian rules footballer, born 1916

Personal information
- Full name: William Batt Maslen
- Born: 1 January 1916; Northcote, Victoria
- Died: 8 October 1974 (aged 58); Fitzroy, Victoria
- Original team: Preston
- Height: 173 cm (5 ft 8 in)
- Weight: 73 kg (161 lb)

Playing career^{1}
Years	Club	Games (Goals)
1935–39	Preston (VFA)	50 (1)
1939–40	St Kilda	20 (0)
1940–49	Preston (VFA)	122 (52)
- ^{1} Playing statistics correct to the end of 1949.

William Batt Maslen (1 January 1916 – 8 October 1974) was an Australian rules footballer who played with St Kilda in the Victorian Football League (VFL).
