= Maslin =

Maslin is a surname. Notable people with the surname include:

- Bruce Maslin (born 1946), Australian botanist
- David Eckersley-Maslin (1929-2017), Royal Navy admiral
- Evgeny Maslin (1937–2022), Russian general
- Harry Maslin, American record producer
- Jamie Maslin, British author
- Janet Maslin (born 1949), American journalist
- Kim Maslin-Kammerdeiner (born 1964), American soccer player
- Mark Maslin (born 1968), American Earth system scientist
- Martin Maslin (born 1942), English cricketer
- Michael Maslin, American cartoonist
- Mikhail Maslin (1947–2025), Russian historian of philosophy
- Sarah Maslin Nir (born 1983), American journalist
- Sue Maslin, Australian film producer
- Victor Maslin Yeates, British World War I flying ace
- William Maslin (1848–1924), New Zealand politician

== See also ==
- Maslen
