= Raymond Moulton O'Brien =

British-American businessman

Raymond Moulton Seághan O'Brien (29 December 1905 – 31 March 1977) was a British-born American businessman, founder of the far-right Irish United Christian Nationalist Party and a pretender to the extinct Earldom of Thomond and the Barony of Ibracken. He claimed to be the Prince of a fictitious microstate known as the Principality of Thomond.

== Background ==
O'Brien was born in London, England to John Denis ("Dudley") O'Brien and Marian Gertrude Florence Moulton on 29 December 1905. His mother was an Englishwoman from Edgbaston, a well-off area in Birmingham, while his father was an Irish American (his great-grandfather having migrated from Dublin in the 1850s). His parents were married four months before he was born, at St Matthew's Church in London. After five years, his parents divorced and his mother remarried Guy Athol Wilson-Weston, an officer in the British Indian Army; O'Brien's mother changed his name to Raymond Moulton Wilson-Weston as part of the new family set-up. He lived in the Governor's House, Lahore with his mother and step-father, a life of luxury with many servants. Although his mother and step-father divorced a few years later, O'Brien had been raised to believe that Guy was his true father and was devastated to find out this was not the case, causing him to have an identity crisis.

== Origin of claims ==
In 1936 several American newspapers published Raymond Moulton O'Brien's claims to nobility. According to a Time article, his mother claimed that he was conceived by her first husband who was allegedly a claimant to the extinct title of the Earl of Thomond. O'Brien appealed to the Irish authorities for the recognition of his title and that same year a Mexican court issued a judgement decreeing that he was indeed the Earl of Thomond. This decree was ratified by France, Germany and Luxembourg. Following this, he wrote personally from New York to the Taoiseach of Ireland, Éamon de Valera, asking whether he would be allowed to use the titles of Earl of Thomond and Baron Ibracken. The Irish authorities made inquiries leading Thomas Sadleir of the College of Arms to confirm that O'Brien had no claim to the titles.

The next year O'Brien wrote again to de Valera arguing against his refusal to accept O'Brien's claim. Thomas Sadleir was contacted again who told the Irish government that "there was nothing in law to prevent a man assuming and bearing any name he wished whether that name be in the form of a title or otherwise, provided that in doing so he did not infringe on the rights of some other individual".

== Principality of Thomond ==
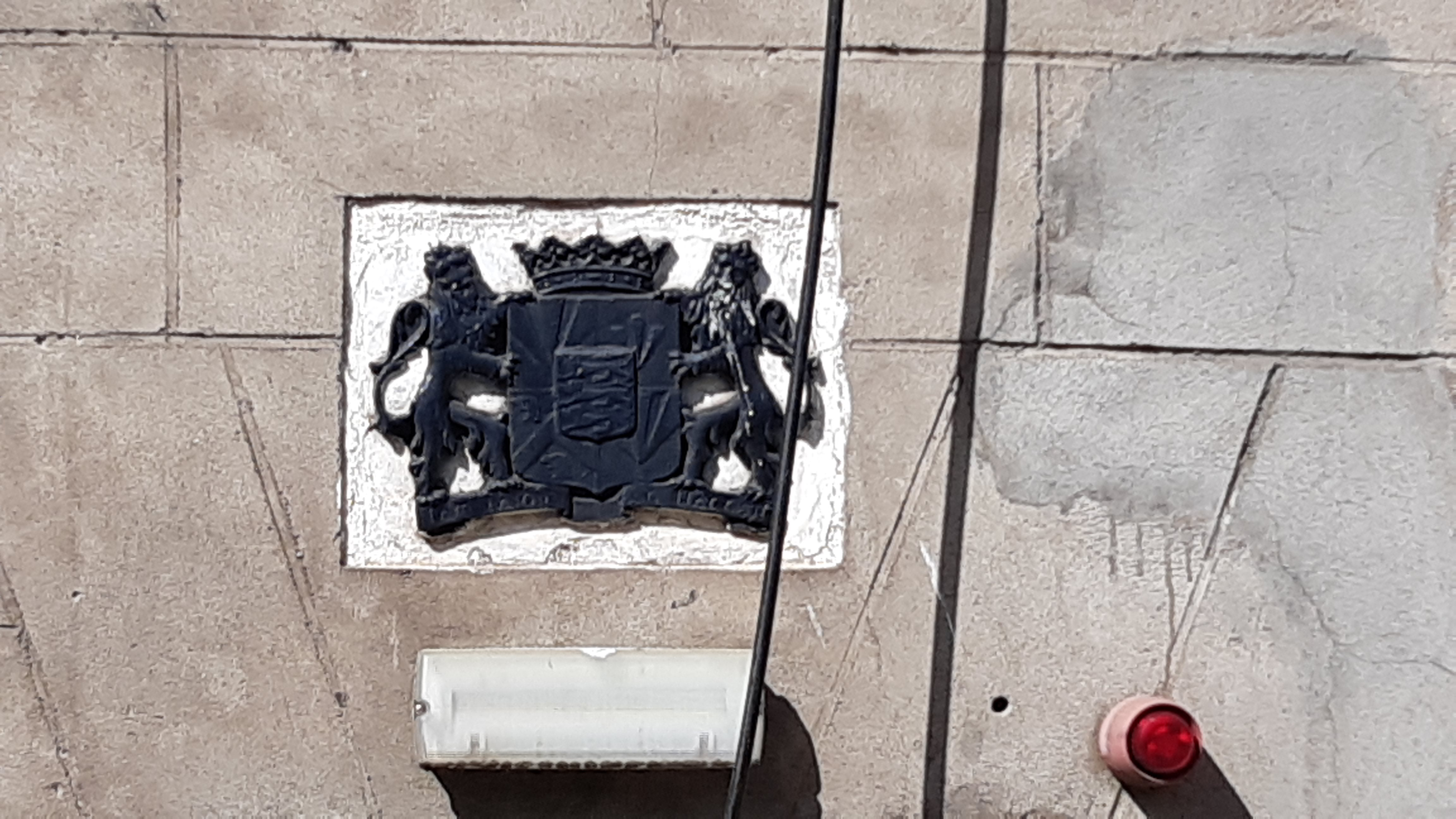
Invented arms of the 'Principality of Thomond' displayed at 5 Charlemont Street, Dublin; it combines elements from the arms of the Barons Inchiquin and Earls of Thomond.

At some point between 1937 and 1944, O'Brien moved from New York to Dublin and became involved with the Irish fascist party Ailtirí na hAiséirghe. In 1944 he faked an accusation of slander against him which failed when the Chief Herald noticed that O'Brien was simultaneously plaintiff, defendant and arbitrator. In 1949 he was involved in a court case when he was struck by his neighbour. Later that year on June 17 he was arrested and tried for indecently assaulting a 12-year-old girl, however the jury failed to reach a verdict. He was arrested once more the next year on the same charges but was again found not guilty.

Around this time O'Brien began claiming to be the Prince of a microstate known as the Principality of Thomond. The Southend Times in Britain published an interview with Count Howard d'Angerville, who had been appointed Honorary Dalcassian Envoy and Minister to England by "His Highness Prince O'Brien of Thomond". D'Angerville claimed that although the alleged principality's existence was not recognised by either Britain or Ireland it had already been recognised by "most of the crowned heads and republics throughout the world" including America, Sweden, Denmark, France, Belgium, Latvia and Estonia, despite the latter two nations having been annexed by the Soviet Union. A Belgian newspaper also published an article alleging the existence of the principality.

O'Brien's claims continued to deceive many foreign newspapers and diplomats to the consternation of the Department of External Affairs who circulated to all of its missions abroad a statement prepared by the Irish Genealogical Office denying O'Brien's titles and the existence of the principality. Despite this, diplomatic confusion continued to circulate abroad including from the governments of East Germany and Monaco.

== Irish United Christian Nationalist Party ==
In 1951 O'Brien established the Irish United Christian Nationalist Party, modelled on Gerald L. K. Smith's Christian Nationalist Crusade, and announced his intention to protect Ireland from communism by establishing a paramilitary organisation known as the Black Legion. Irish intelligence chief Dan Bryan reported that the party had "all the hall-marks of an orthodox Fascist movement". However, by January 1953 the Department of Defence announced that the movement had at one time 25 legionaries but was now "practically non-existent".

== Later life and death ==
O'Brien was eventually confined to a psychiatric hospital in Stillorgan Castle. He died in Dublin on 31 March 1977 and was buried in Birmingham.
