= 2025 in radio =

The following is a list of events affecting radio broadcasting in 2025. Events listed include radio program debuts, finales, cancellations, station launches, closures, and format changes, as well as information about controversies and deaths of radio personalities.

== Notable events ==
=== January ===
Date	Event	Source
6	Finnish DJ Yotto broadcasts his first hour-long show, "Yotto's Odd World", on Europe's One World Radio.	
10	Mexican radio station XEQI-AM surrenders its licence to broadcast.	
30	Spanish variety radio station WYKO, based in Puerto Rico, canceled its licence to broadcast.	

=== February ===
Date	Event	Source
14	In the Philippines, DWFO launched its Contemporary MOR station as 87.5 Republika Ni Juan.	
18	Westwood One signs a rights deal with the United States Soccer Federation to be the official radio network of the men's national team and women's national team.	

=== March ===
Date	Event	Source
1	In retaliation for escalating tensions between U.S. president Donald Trump and Canada, Canadian broadcaster Corus Entertainment stations of all formats devote all of their playlists for the day to Canadian content.	
3	Cumulus Media begins the process of closing down underperforming terrestrial radio stations, consisting mainly of FM rimshot signals and AM stations without translators.	
13	WIRY Plattsburgh, New York closes after 75 years of operation, blaming its own inability to hire salespeople, music royalty increases and changes in music listening patterns that diverted listeners away from local, independently owned full-service stations such as WIRY.	
14	U.S. President Donald Trump signed an executive order to reduce the functions of several agencies including the U.S. Agency for Global Media, which owns the international broadcaster Voice of America (VOA) and its sister networks (Radio Free Europe/Radio Liberty, Radio y Televisión Martí, and Radio Free Asia), to the minimum required by law. The next day, all employees could not access VOA headquarters, and many VOA foreign language broadcasts replaced news and other regularly scheduled programming with music. Several international broadcasters which uses the shortwave radio transmitter facilities of VOA are also affected.	
26	BBC radio series HARDtalk is broadcast for the last time, to be replaced by a similar programme titled The Interview. while its last radio episode was aired two days later on 28 March.	

=== April ===
Date	Event	Source
8	Canada's Maritime Broadcasting System rebrands all 5 of its radio stations it had acquired from Bell Media. CKTO-FM in Truro, Nova Scotia, CKBC-FM in Bathurst, New Brunswick and CIKX-FM in Grand Falls, New Brunswick became The Wave with the "Wave" branding expanding into New Brunswick. CJCJ-FM in Woodstock, New Brunswick also became The Wave and flipped to classic hits. CKTY-FM in Truro, Nova Scotia returned to its heritage Cat Country identity.	
14	Canadian company Vista Radio closes its acquisition on 21 radio stations from Bell Media.	
20	US network Westwood One purges seven of the 24/7 satellite networks that it inherited from Satellite Music Network, Jones Radio Network and Transtar. The seven networks include Good Time Oldies, a gold-based classic hits network, two classic rock networks, two adult hits networks and its contemporary hit radio network. Most of the stations carrying those networks would be forced to flip to other formats.	
22	Ted Cruz becomes the first currently serving United States Senator to host a nationally syndicated radio show as Premiere Networks launches Cruz's podcast Verdict with Ted Cruz, which he co-hosts with current Premiere host Ben Ferguson, into weekend syndication. To avoid conflict of interest and campaign finance issues, Cruz will not be paid for hosting the program.	
—N/a	Several Australian news outlets reported that Sydney-based radio station CADA airs Weekdays with Thy, of which the latter was not a real person, but was AI-generated.	

=== May ===
Date	Event	Source
29	DWPM Radyo 630, a Philippine AM radio station controlled jointly by Philippine Collective Media Corporation and ABS-CBN, rebranded to DZMM; reviving the callsign 5 years after its shutdown in 2020.	
-	Mareco Broadcasting Network's Crossover Radio Online permanently ceases operations due to unknown issues.	

=== June ===
Date	Event	Source
7	Philippine news/music network XFM began its broadcast on soft launch through 99.5 DWRT-FM, a radio station in Metro Manila owned by Real Radio Network. Y2H Broadcasting Network, XFM's parent, began occupying the operations of the said station through airtime lease agreement since May 1.	

=== July ===
Date	Event	Source
1	Overcomer Ministry, the radio evangelism network owned by the estate of R. G. "Brother" Stair (who died in 2021), begins cancelling its syndication contracts. Overcomer had previously bought large blocks of airtime on United States shortwave radio broadcasters, providing a key source of revenue for those stations (among them WRMI, WWCR, WTWW and WBCQ) and select AM stations (such as clear-channel WWVA). The program disappeared from most of its affiliates on this date, with select others continuing to air the program until its carriage contracts expire.	

=== August ===
Date	Event	Source
5	KLBQ-FM (El Dorado, Arkansas) drops classic country for contemporary christian as "101.5 The Ark".	

=== September ===
Date	Event	Source
1	Susan Stamberg retires from NPR. A part of the public radio network since its launch in 1971 (she is regarded as one of its "founding mothers"), Stamberg hosted All Things Considered and the Sunday version of Weekend Edition. Stamberg would die one month later on October 16.	
4	Alan Levin, a fixture of radio in Rochester New York, and member of the Radio Hall of Fame, abruptly retires from radio after a format switch of WAIO from Hot Talk "Radio 95.1" to Active Rock "Rock 95.1" and an attempted demoting of Levin to weekends by station owner iHeartMedia. Levin hosted a weekday morning show for 40 years, starting on WCMF-FM Rochester in 1985 and later moving to WAIO after a contract stalemate with WCMF owner Entercom in 2008.	
15	Power FM (under Word Broadcasting Corporation) was rebranded as Juander Radyo (under RSV Broadcasting Network) in Cebu, Philippines and Ormoc, Philippines.	
30	Philippine radio program Boys Night Out abruptly ended its broadcast on Magic 89.9 after 19 years.	

=== October ===
Date	Event	Source
11	Dr. Demento retires from broadcasting with the release of his final episode of The Dr. Demento Show, ending a 55-year run. Host Barry Hansen had been hosting the show as a subscription online offering for the previous 15 years, after 36 years in broadcast syndication.	
30	Singaporean media company So Drama! Entertainment ceases broadcast of its two stations 883Jia and Power 98 from FM terrestrial airwaves as both stations will transition into digital-only broadcast via live audio streaming on the company's new radio platform Kakee. Its broadcast license frequencies were recalled by the Infocomm Media Development Authority.	
31	More than 30 years after being replaced by the Spanish-language FM radio station KBUE, the Long Beach, California-based hard rock and heavy metal FM radio station KNAC (Pure Rock) is resurrected as a replacement of the call letters to the High Desert-based radio station KHDR (Highway Rock). This version of KNAC replicates its original format, playing a variety of music from classic rock to hard rock and heavy metal, including heavy bands (Iron Maiden for example) that no other radio stations would regularly play.	
31	WAKW in Cincinnati, for the second consecutive year, is the first non-stunting station in North America to adopt the Christmas music radio format for the 2025 holiday season.	

=== November ===
Date	Event	Source
13	KNOC (Natchitoches) drops classic country for rhythmic throwbacks as "95.9 The Bounce" and ending a nearly seven years of classic country programming starting January 2019.	
28	The Grand Ole Opry reaches 100 years on the air and thereby becomes the first American radio program to reach that milestone.	

=== December ===
Date	Event	Source
1	92.7 ORFM in San Fernando, Pampanga are officially launched by Oriental Mindoro based Rabino Broadcasting and Advertising Services. But it is silent on December 2.	
10	Beasley Broadcast Group, an American broadcast station owner, becomes the target of a pump-and-dump attack as speculators and automated bots spread disinformation about the company in an effort to drive retail investors to buy the stock and drive up its price.	
15	Howard Stern announces a three-year extension with SiriusXM that renews The Howard Stern Show through the end of 2028. The extension comes after several months of prolonged negotiations that resolved two weeks before the end of Stern's previous contract; the terms of the contract will see Stern take on a reduced, more "flexible" production schedule.	
27	Tiësto's Club Life, the internationally syndicated weekly EDM show hosted by Dutch DJ Tiësto, ended its broadcast after 978 episodes.	
31	Cumulus Media-owned WNAM/Neenah-Menasha, Wisconsin ends broadcasting after 78 years on the air.	

== Deaths ==
- January 2 – Bernie Constantin, Swiss songwriter and radio show host, 77
- January 3 – Willem van Kooten, Dutch businessman and DJ (Joost den Draaijer), 83
- January 12 – Arnold Frolows, Australian music director and radio personality, 74 (liver cancer)
- January 13 – Buck White, American mandolinist and Grand Ole Opry member, 94
- January 16 – Bob Uecker, American baseball announcer (Milwaukee Brewers Radio Network from 1971 to 2024), 90
- January 22 – Pete Medhurst, American football announcer (Navy Midshipmen football), 55
- January 29 – Max Schautzer, Austrian-born German television and radio presenter, 84
- January 30 – Leif "Loket" Olsson, Swedish television and radio host and singer, 82
- February 2 – John Crosse, British radio and TV announcer, 83
- February 11 – Philip Brady, Australian radio broadcaster (3AK, 3AW), 85
- February 16 – Reymund Tinaza, Filipino radio broadcaster and correspondent (Abante Radyo, Bombo Radyo Philippines), 42
- February 24 – Al Trautwig, American sportscaster (New York Apollo radio broadcasts), 68
- March 11 – Bob Rivers, American radio host and parody musician, 68
- March 13 – John Feinstein, American sportswriter (NPR, CBS Sports Radio), 69
- March 20 – Bob Davis, American sportscaster (Kansas Jayhawks), 80
- March 22:
  - Bill Mercer, American sportscaster (Dallas Cowboys, CBS Radio, Mutual Broadcasting, among many others), 99
  - Andy Peebles, British radio DJ and presenter (BBC Radio 1), 76
- March 30 – Jim Quinn, American shock jock and conservative talk radio host, 82
- April 14 – Jed "the Fish" Gould, American new wave/alternative disc jockey, 69
- April 15 – Winston "Wink" Martindale, American disc jockey and emcee (The Elvis Presley Story, 2021 version of The History of Rock & Roll), 91
- April 17 – Colin Berry, British radio disc jockey, presenter and newsreader (BBC Radio 2), 79
- April 20:
  - Bob Sinclair Sr., American radio executive (Sinclair Telecable), 79
  - Mike Patrick, American sportscaster (WVSC, Jacksonville Dolphins basketball), 80
- April 23 – Steve McMichael, American Pro Football Hall of Fame defensive lineman and sports radio host (WMVP), 67
- May 11 – Ted Randall, American shortwave radio broadcaster (WTWW, WRMI Legends), engineer and announcer, 73
- May 22 – Michael Rogas, Philippine radio broadcaster and correspondent (Presidential Broadcast Service / Radyo Pilipinas, DZXL), 44
- June 4 – Giancarlo Santalmassi, Italian journalist, head of Radio 24, 83
- June 18 – Lou Christie, American singer (specials for 60s Gold on SiriusXM), 82
- June 19 – Gailard Sartain, American actor and comedy host (The Un-Filmy Can Festival for KAKC), 81
- June 21 – Raïssa Gbédji, Beninese singer and journalist, 52
- June 24 – Garry Ahern, New Zealand sports broadcaster (Radio New Zealand), 75
- July 1 – Jimmy Swaggart, American televangelist and owner/founder of the SonLife Broadcasting Network, 90
- July 2 – Sven Lindahl, Swedish musician, radio and TV presenter, 88
- July 4 – Lyndon Byers, Canadian ice hockey player and radio host (WAAF-FM), 61
- July 14 – John MacArthur, American evangelist (Grace to You), 86
- August 1 – Jeannie Seely, American country singer (a record 5,397 appearances as a Grand Ole Opry member), 85
- August 4 – James Whale, British radio show host, 74
- August 5 – Leonard Lopate, American radio host (WNYC, WBAI, WHDD-FM), 84
- August 13 – Art Wander, American broadcaster best known for his work in the sports radio and beautiful music formats, 98
- August 21 – James Dobson, American author, psychologist and radio commentator (created Adventures in Odyssey and Focus on the Family Radio Theatre), 89
- August 28 – Gary Burbank, American radio comedian (WLW, voiced Earl Pitts Uhmerikun for a series of nationally syndicated commentaries), 84
- September 10 – Charlie Kirk, American right-wing talk podcaster (Salem Radio Network), 31 (further info: Assassination of Charlie Kirk)
- September 11 – Bruce DuMont, American, founder of the Museum of Broadcast Communications, Radio Hall of Fame and host of Beyond the Beltway, 81
- October 6 – Gisèle Gallichan, Canadian journalist and presenter, 79
- October 14 – Sima Birach, Yugoslavian-American owner of mostly brokered ethnic AM radio stations through Birach Broadcasting Corporation, 86
- October 16 – Susan Stamberg, American anchor of NPR's All Things Considered and Weekend Edition Sunday, 87
- October 17 – Vidar Lønn-Arnesen, Norwegian singer, radio and TV presenter, 85
- October 25 – Ofer Nachshon, Israeli broadcaster and radio announcer, 59
- October 29 – Pierre Robert, American radio personality and disc jockey (WMMR), 70
- November 1 – Bob Trumpy, American football player and color commentator (NFL on Westwood One), 80
- November 9 – John Laws, Australian radio presenter (Triple M Bendigo), 80
- November 11 – Geoff Fox, American radio personality and meteorologist (WBT, WPEN), 75
- December 5 – Patrik Hezucký, Czech radio presenter, 55 (liver cancer)
- December 10 - Jim Ward, American actor and radio personality co-host of the Stephanie Miller show, 66.
- December 12 - Benjie Liwanag Jr., Filipino journalist (Abante Radyo 1494), 61
- December 25 - Stu Phillips, Canadian singer and Grand Ole Opry member, 92
- December 29 - John Mulrooney, comedian and radio host (several stations including WPYX/Albany and WMMR/Cleveland), 67.

== See also ==
- 2025 in British radio
