= Dee Kosh =

Singaporean radio and internet personality (born 1988)

- Born: Darryl Ian Koshy; 2 November 1988 (age 38); Philippines
- Occupation: Former YouTuber

YouTube information
- Channel: DeeKosh
- Years active: 2006–2021
- Genres: Entertainment; Comedy
- Subscribers: 359 thousand
- Views: 88 million
- Last updated: 30 May 2022

Darryl Ian Koshy (born 2 November 1988), better known by his stage name Dee Kosh, is a Singaporean convicted sex offender, former YouTuber, radio and internet personality, actor and singer.

== Early life ==
Darryl Ian Koshy was born and raised in the Philippines to Singaporean parents, a Chinese mother and an Indian father.

== Career ==
In early 2012, Koshy auditioned to host "The Rude Awakening" on 987FM with Rosalyn Lee; the station hired him as the host of "Say It With Music" instead. In April 2013, he started hosting the weeknight "The Double D Show" on 987FM with Divian Nair. In 2014, Koshy left Mediacorp to join Power 98, a radio station run by SAFRA Radio, hosting the evening time belt.

In late 2014, Koshy and Nair produced a web series on "the most random of topics", titled The Drive. Koshy contributed vocals to the COVID-19 pandemic-themed multilingual song "Stay Home", which was released in April 2020.

== Sex crimes conviction ==
On 15 August 2020, an Instagram user accused Koshy of "[sexually harassing] me under the guise of recruiting me for his channel". At least five others subsequently came forward with similar accusations. The Straits Times reported on 19 August that six police reports had been filed against Koshy. Koshy initially denied all the allegations but later stated that "there is some truth to the things which are being said now" and apologised for his "questionable" tone, while maintaining that he did not solicit sexual favours from teenage males.

In the days following the allegations, several companies reevaluated their relationships with Koshy. Production company Night Owl Cinematics suspended all projects involving him, while Huawei and Lenovo ended their sponsorship deals. Koshy has been "on leave" from Power 98FM since 17 August 2020. Koshy was charged with "sexual exploitation of a young person and making obscene films" on 19 August 2021. He posted $20,000 bail and a trial date was set for 15 September 2021.

His case was adjourned to March. He faced a sentence of up to two years for each charge of making payment offers for underage sex. He pleaded guilty to the charges on 30 May 2022.

On 3 August 2022, in their submissions, the prosecution sought a sentence of five to eight months' jail, citing that Koshy's crimes, which were mainly and deliberately targeting the underaged, were "highly premeditated" and he did not show true remorse despite the aggravating nature of his crimes. The defence, however, seek a lower jail term of two-and-a-half months on the basis that he had low basis of re-offending and showed some regret for his actions. On 5 August 2022, he was convicted on the sexual offences involving minors and was sentenced to 32 weeks' jail. Koshy was released from jail in March 2023.

== Filmography ==
=== Films ===
Year	Title	Role	Notes
2014	Candle	Ian	Also writer
2016	Lulu the Movie		Cameo appearance
