= 2022 BWF World Junior Championships – Boys' singles =

Tournament details
- Dates: 24 October 2022 – 30 October 2022
- Edition: 22nd
- Level: International
- Venue: Palacio de Deportes de Santander
- Location: Santander, Spain

The boys' singles of the tournament 2022 BWF World Junior Championships is an individual badminton tournament to crowned the best boys' singles under 19 player across the BWF associate members around the world. Players will compete to win the Eye Level Cup presented by the former BWF President and chairman of the World Youth Culture Foundation, Kang Young Joong. The tournament will be held from 24 to 30 October 2022 in the Palacio de Deportes de Santander, Spain. The defending champion was Kunlavut Vitidsarn from Thailand, but he was not eligible to participate this year.

== Seeds ==
Click on the seed number of a player to go to their draw section.

1. (France) Alex Lanier (quarter-finals)
2. (Indonesia) Alwi Farhan (second round)
3. (Malaysia) Justin Hoh (fourth round)
4. (India) Sankar Subramanian (final)
5. (Estonia) Tauri Kilk (third round)
6. (Canada) Victor Lai (first round)
7. (Germany) Sanjeevi Padmanabhan Vasudevan (third round)
8. (Belgium) Charles Fouyn (second round)

9. (Guatemala) Yeison del Cid (first round)
10. (Germany) Karim Krehemeier (first round)
11. (Indonesia) Bodhi Ratana Teja Gotama (fourth round)
12. (Italy) Luca Zhou (third round)
13. (Denmark) Jakob Houe (third round)
14. (Denmark) Christian Faust Kjær (third round)
15. (Netherlands) Noah Haase (second round)
16. (Italy) Alessandro Gozzini (second round)

== Draw ==
=== Finals ===
Quarter-finals
1	(France) Alex Lanier	21	19	17
(Chinese Taipei) Kuo Kuan-lin	14	21	21
(South Korea) Kim Byung-jae	21	21
(South Korea) Cho Hyeon-woo	14	19
(China) Hu Zhean	18	21	16
4	(India) Sankar Subramanian	21	8	21
(China) Pan Yinlong	20	19
(Thailand) Panitchaphon Teeraratsakul	22	21

Semi-finals
(Chinese Taipei) Kuo Kuan-lin	16	21	21
(South Korea) Kim Byung-jae	21	10	18
4	(India) Sankar Subramanian	21	21
(Thailand) Panitchaphon Teeraratsakul	13	15

Final
(Chinese Taipei) Kuo Kuan-lin	21	22
4	(India) Sankar Subramanian	14	20

=== Top half ===
==== Section 1 ====
First round
(England) M Pang	17	12
(India) B Rhagav	21	21
(Latvia) E Meirans	6	8
(China) Zhu X C	21	21
(Finland) N Nyqvist	21	21
(Estonia) H Themas	13	13
11	(Indonesia) B R T Gotama	21	21
(Luxembourg) J Pauquet	13	11
(Japan) S Saito	21	21
(Slovakia) R Pavlík	9	8
(Slovakia) S Suchý	21	21
(Sweden) E Ramstedt	9	18
(Belgium) A Huberty	13	16
(Czech Republic) D Dvořák	21	21

Second round
1	(France) A Lanier	21	21
(India) B Raghav	14	15
(China) Zhu X C	21	21
(Finland) N Nyqvist	10	10
11	(Indonesia) B R T Gotama	21	19	21
(Japan) S Saito	19	21	19
(Slovakia) S Suchý	21	21
(Czech Republic) D Dvořák	12	10

Third round
1	(France) A Lanier	21	21
(China) Zhu X C	17	16
11	(Indonesia) B R T Gotama	21	21
(Slovakia) S Suchý	10	4

Fourth round
1	(France) A Lanier	21	17	21
11	(Indonesia) B R T Gotama	17	21	14

==== Section 2 ====
First round
8	(Belgium) C Fouyn	21	21
(Hungary) A Könczöl	17	18
(Hong Kong) Lam K T	21	21
(Iceland) G A Gigja	10	10
(Armenia) M Harutyunyan	9	7
(India) A Shetty	21	21
(Singapore) M Lau	21	21
(Peru) A Viale	13	8
12	(Italy) L Zhou	21	21
(Bulgaria) S Terziev	17	19
(Thailand) T Yimjit	21	21
(Republic of Ireland) V Pontanosa	15	17
(Chinese Taipei) Kuo K L	21	21
(Singapore) R Tan	14	12
(Netherlands) R van Dalm	21	21
(Sri Lanka) S Weerasekara	18	13

Second round
8	(Belgium) C Fouyn	21	18	14
(Hong Kong) Lam K T	19	21	21
(India) A Shetty	22	15	18
(Singapore) M Lau	20	21	21
12	(Italy) L Zhou	21	21
(Thailand) T Yimjit	18	13
(Chinese Taipei) Kuo K L	21	21
(Netherlands) R van Dalm	6	5

Third round
(Hong Kong) Lam K T	9	15
(Singapore) M Lau	21	21
12	(Italy) L Zhou	21	12	8
(Chinese Taipei) Kuo K L	11	21	21

Fourth round
(Singapore) M Lau	15	16
(Chinese Taipei) Kuo K L	21	21

==== Section 3 ====
First round
(United States) A Mar	21	21
(Georgia (country)) D Tatevosiani	8	2
(Portugal) R Maciel	21	21
(Peru) F Tabini	14	17
(Hong Kong) Lam T T	19	10
(Chinese Taipei) Tsai C-h	21	21
13	(Denmark) J Houe	21	21
(Czech Republic) D Kopřiva	17	15
(Slovakia) K L Lenarčič	12	13
(Australia) O Zhao	21	21
(Hong Kong) Fu C P	21	21
(Norway) A Holmedal	13	9
(Austria) I Nicolussi	7	7
(South Korea) Kim B-j	21	21

Second round
3	(Malaysia) J Hoh	21	21
(United States) A Mar	19	10
(Portugal) R Maciel	9	7
(Chinese Taipei) Tsai C-h	21	21
13	(Denmark) J Houe	21	21
(Australia) O Zhao	8	16
(Hong Kong) Fu C P	9	20
(South Korea) Kim B-j	21	22

Third round
3	(Malaysia) J Hoh	21	21
(Chinese Taipei) Tsai C-h	13	10
13	(Denmark) J Houe	13	21	15
(South Korea) Kim B-j	21	18	21

Fourth round
3	(Malaysia) J Hoh	17	19
(South Korea) Kim B-j	21	21

==== Section 4 ====
First round
5	(Estonia) T Kilk	21	21
(Egypt) S Omar	12	11
(Sri Lanka) S Perera	23	22
(Spain) D Franco	21	20
(Slovenia) M Koroša	5	11
(Indonesia) M R Al Fajri	21	21
(Egypt) M Hegazy	10	9
(Canada) J Nguyen	21	21
10	(Germany) K Krehemeier	21	12	6
(Thailand) A Prasertphetmanee	16	21	21
(Canada) T Lock	21	21
(French Polynesia) E Maublanc	4	12
(Portugal) G Silva	16	19
(Switzerland) N Franconville	21	21
(South Korea) Cho H-w	21	21
(Ukraine) O Titov	14	15

Second round
5	(Estonia) T Kilk	21	21
(Sri Lanka) S Perera	18	18
(Indonesia) M R Al Fajri	15	21	22
(Canada) J Nguyen	21	19	24
(Thailand) A Prasertphetmanee	21	21
(Canada) T Lock	8	17
(Switzerland) N Franconville	8	12
(South Korea) Cho H-w	21	21

Third round
5	(Estonia) T Kilk	16	14
(Canada) J Nguyen	21	21
(Thailand) A Prasertphetmanee	14	13
(South Korea) Cho H-w	21	21

Fourth round
(Canada) J Nguyen	19	12
(South Korea) Cho H-w	21	21

=== Bottom half ===
==== Section 5 ====
First round
(Sri Lanka) T Rajakaruna	7	11
(China) Hu ZA	21	21
(United States) R Ma	21	21
(Georgia (country)) G Ter-Karapetyan	7	5
(Sweden) R Makboul	21	21
(Latvia) T Sala	11	12
(Norway) T Fjeldheim	18	8
16	(Italy) A Gozzini	21	21
(Australia) K Goh	21	21
(Belgium) B Rolin	12	16
(Iceland) G I Helgason	7	4
(China) Wang Z J	21	21
(Netherlands) C Spaans	10	13
(Spain) A Morán	21	21
(Czech Republic) D Smutný	17	11
7	(Germany) S P Vasudevan	21	21

Second round
(China) Hu ZA	21	21
(United States) R Ma	16	10
(Sweden) R Makboul	22	21
16	(Italy) A Gozzini	20	8
(Australia) K Goh	13	9
(China) Wang Z J	21	21
(Spain) A Morán	15	17
7	(Germany) S P Vasudevan	21	21

Third round
(China) Hu ZA	21	21
(Sweden) R Makboul	17	7
(China) Wang Z J	22	21
7	(Germany) S P Vasudevan	20	14

Fourth round
(China) Hu ZA	21	21
(China) Wang ZJ	16	19

==== Section 6 ====
First round
(Finland) A Mäki	26	8	20
(Hungary) K Tóth	24	21	22
(Slovakia) S Kadlec	10	13
(Denmark) W Bøgebjerg	21	21
(Ukraine) V Koluzaiev	21	21
(Armenia) D Saribekyan	13	9
(Thailand) N Pusri	21	21
9	(Guatemala) Y del Cid	12	13
(Sweden) E Hylander	21	21
(Portugal) S Batalha	15	15
(Spain) B Porto	21	21	21
(Peru) S Durand	19	23	19
(Slovenia) Z Podgoršek	11	15
(Singapore) R Ng	21	21

Second round
(Hungary) K Tóth	17	5
(Denmark) W Bøgebjerg	21	21
(Ukraine) V Koluzaiev	17	12
(Thailand) N Pusri	21	21
(Sweden) E Hylander	16	21	20
(Spain) B Porto	21	17	22
(Singapore) R Ng	13	8
4	(India) S Subramanian	21	21

Third round
(Denmark) W Bøgebjerg	15	13
(Thailand) N Pusri	21	21
(Spain) B Porto	4	5
4	(India) S Subramanian	21	21

Fourth round
(Thailand) N Pusri	10	12
4	(India) S Subramanian	21	21

==== Section 7 ====
First round
(Poland) D Kwinta	15	17
(South Korea) Kim T-r	21	21
(Estonia) M Krisma	7	14
(Japan) S Ogaki	21	21
(England) N Dalvi	21	21
(Norway) T Barth	9	17
(Ukraine) M Vyshnevyi	11	7
14	(Denmark) C F Kjær	21	21
(United States) A Chim	21	21
(Iceland) E T Briem	16	18
(Hong Kong) J Gunawan	21	21
(Republic of Ireland) M Cheung	8	11
(Germany) L Pongratz	21	21
(French Polynesia) H Yvonet	6	12
(China) Pan Y L	21	21
6	(Canada) V Lai	13	10

Second round
(South Korea) Kim T-r	21	21
(Japan) S Ogaki	17	19
(England) N Dalvi	13	13
14	(Denmark) C F Kjær	21	21
(United States) A Chim	11	13
(Hong Kong) J Gunawan	21	21
(Germany) L Pongratz	4	9
(China) Pan Y L	21	21

Third round
(South Korea) Kim T-r	21	12	21
14	(Denmark) C F Kjær	12	21	9
(Hong Kong) J Gunawan	17	21	10
(China) Pan Y L	21	16	21

Fourth round
(South Korea) Kim T-r	20	21	16
(China) Pan Y L	22	14	21

==== Section 8 ====
First round
(Latvia) R Zugs	7	6
(Malaysia) Ariffin Z	21	21
(Malaysia) E Ewe	21	15	21
(Japan) K Sugawara	16	21	13
(Egypt) Y Mohamed	9	16
(Chinese Taipei) Ting Y-c	21	21
(Australia) J Yu	11	15
15	(Netherlands) N Haase	21	21
(Switzerland) L Joliat	14	11
(Japan) D Tanioka	21	21
(Indonesia) P B Shujiwo	21	21
(French Polynesia) K Teiefitu	4	0
(South Korea) Park S-j	6	17
(Thailand) P Teeraratsakul	21	21

Second round
(Malaysia) Ariffin Z	19	15
(Malaysia) E Ewe	21	21
(Chinese Taipei) Ting Y-c	21	21
15	(Netherlands) N Haase	19	16
(Japan) D Tanioka	18	21	17
(Indonesia) P B Shujiwo	21	16	21
(Thailand) P Teeraratsakul	21	21
2	(Indonesia) A Farhan	17	16

Third round
(Malaysia) E Ewe	21	22
(Chinese Taipei) Ting Y-c	19	20
(Indonesia) P B Shujiwo	20	21	16
(Thailand) P Teeraratsakul	22	9	21

Fourth round
(Malaysia) E Ewe	18	17
(Thailand) P Teeraratsakul	21	21
