= Brent International School =

Location
- Brentville Subdivision, Barangay Mamplasan; Biñan, Laguna, 4024; Philippines; 14°18′12″N 121°4′55″E

Information
- Type: Private international school
- Established: 1909; 117 years ago
- President: Jason Atkins
- Headmaster: Jason Atkins
- Grades: Preschool– Grade 12
- Campus: Manila Campus
- Campus size: 26 acres / 10.6 hectares
- Color: Maroon
- Athletics conference: Asia Pacific Activities Conference
- Mascot: Lion
- Accreditation: Western Association of Schools and Colleges
- Yearbook: Ganza
- Website: brent.edu.ph

Brent International School (abbreviation: Brent School or Brent Manila) is an international co-educational, day school associated with the Episcopal Church in the Philippines. It has campuses in different locations throughout the Philippines: Brent School Manila in Brgy. Mamplasan, Biñan, Laguna; Brent School Baguio; and Brent School Subic.

== History ==
Brent International School was founded in Baguio in 1909 by Charles Brent, the Missionary Bishop to the Philippines for the Episcopal Church. Brent received its IB Diploma Programme (IBDP) authorization from the International Baccalaureate Organization (IBO) in 1986.

== Campus ==
=== Manila ===
In 1984, the Board of Trustees of Brent School established Brent International School Manila in Pasig, Metro Manila (that location has since closed). This second Brent school assumed the traditions, the style, and the educational system of its mother school, and its first twelve students graduated in 1986. Brent School Manila is now the Main Campus, located in Biñan, and the member school of Asia Pacific Activities Conference. The campus contains two learning center buildings; one for the upper school, middle school and lower school students and the other for students below third grade. The school also has two fields for after-school activities and an oval track.

== The International Baccalaureate Program ==
Brent International School is among the few schools in the Philippines to offer the International Baccalaureate Diploma Programme for students in the 11th and 12th grades. Brent follows an inclusive rather than exclusive policy for the International Baccalaureate Program, allowing any students willing to undertake the heavy course loads to do so. Despite this inclusive philosophy, the average pass rate for Brent diploma candidates for the classes of 2001 to 2007 was 87.3%, well above the world mean of 81.4% for all diploma candidates during the same period. In fact, the last five years the average pass rate was 91.2%. Further, the mean score for Brent IB Diploma awardees over those seven years was 32.7 points, likewise significantly above the 30.1 world mean for the same years.

== Notable alumni ==
- Donny Pangilinan
- Victor Basa
- Bimby Aquino Yap
- Andres Muhlach
- Atasha Muhlach
- Matteo Guidicelli
- Sheila Lirio Marcelo
