= 883Jia =

883JIA
- Singapore
- Frequency: Online

Programming
- Format: Contemporary hits (English and Chinese)

Ownership
- Owner: So Drama! Entertainment
- Sister stations: Power 98

History
- First air date: 12 June 1995; 31 years ago (as Dongli 88.3FM)
- Former frequencies: 88.3 MHz in Singapore, Johor Bahru District/Johor Bahru, Johor, Malaysia and parts of Bintan, Riau, Batam, Indonesia (1995–2025)

Links
- Webcast: https://www.kakee.sg
- Website: https://www.kakee.sg

883Jia is a Singaporean Chinese-language (and only bilingual) internet radio station owned by So Drama! Entertainment. Formerly broadcast on 88.3 megacycles, it played Mandarin and English music from the 1980s up to the 2020s on the airwaves. The station also provides Cantonese and Korean music offerings over their web platform.

== History ==
Plans for launching the then-unnamed Mandarin radio station were announced at the official launch of Power 98 in October 1994, aiming at the Mandarin-speaking majority of the servicemen.

Also known as Dongli 88.3, the radio station complemented its English radio station Power 98. At launch it played contemporary music from the 1980s with some backtracking to the mid-to-late 1980s. Like Power 98, it targeted listeners aged 18 to 35 who are national servicemen.

Test transmissions of the 88.3 frequency leading to its launch date were made between 8:00 a.m. and 9:00 p.m.

883Jia was then relaunched in 2007 as Singapore's only bilingual station, playing both Mandarin and English songs.

88.3Jia along with its sister station Power 98 ended their FM transmission on 30 October 2025 as they relocated their operations through their rebranded 'Kakee' app. Their broadcasting licenses and franchises to own and operate radio stations were revoked, and their former frequencies were recalled by IMDA.

== See also ==
- List of radio stations in Singapore
