= Kuo Kuan-lin =

Taiwanese badminton player (born 2004)

Kuo Kuan-lin 郭冠麟
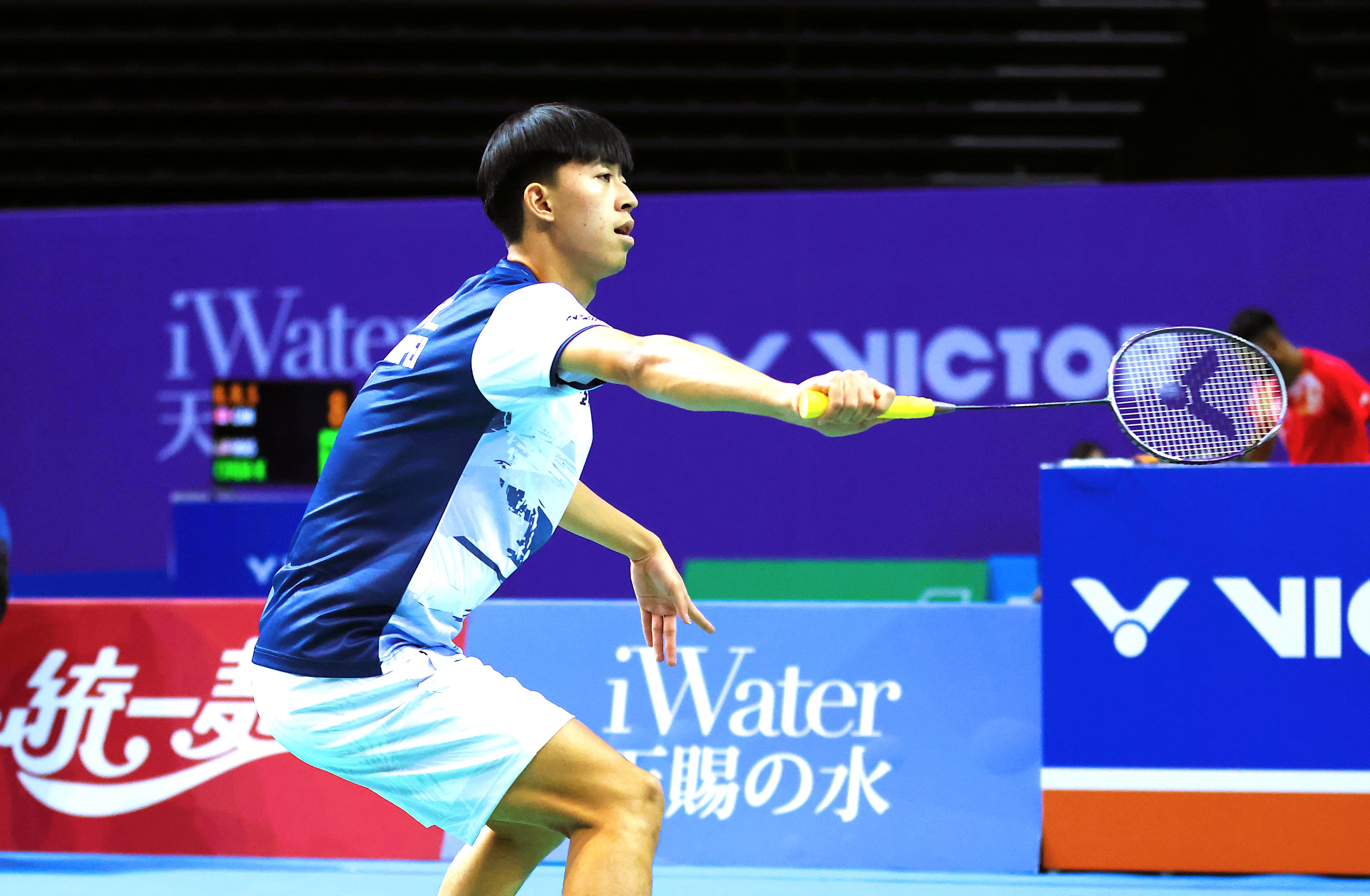
- Kuo at the 2023 Kaohsiung Masters

Personal information
- Born: 3 February 2004 (age 22) Kaohsiung, Taiwan
- Height: 1.83 m (6 ft 0 in)

Sport
- Country: Republic of China (Taiwan)
- Sport: Badminton
- Handedness: Right

Men's singles
- Highest ranking: 69 (15 April 2025)
- BWF profile
Medal record
Men's badminton
Representing Chinese Taipei
World Junior Championships
Gold medal – first place	2022 Santander	Boys' singles
Silver medal – second place	2022 Santander	Mixed team

Kuo Kuan-lin (Chinese: 郭冠麟; pinyin: Guō Guānlín; Wade–Giles: Kuo Kuan-lin; born 3 February 2004) is a Taiwanese badminton player. He won the gold medal in the boys' singles at the 2022 World Junior Championships. In 2026, he won his first BWF World Tour title at the Kaohsiung Masters.

== Personal life ==
Kuo is from Kaohsiung City, Taiwan. He studied at the Kaohsiung Municipal Ying-Ming Junior High School.

== Achievements ==
=== World Junior Championships ===
Boys' singles
Year	Venue	Opponent	Score	Result	Ref.
2022	Palacio de Deportes de Santander; Santander, Spain	(India) Sankar Subramanian	21–14, 22–20	Gold	

=== BWF World Tour (1 title) ===
The BWF World Tour, which was announced on 19 March 2017 and implemented in 2018, is a series of elite badminton tournaments sanctioned by the Badminton World Federation (BWF). The BWF World Tour is divided into levels of World Tour Finals, Super 1000, Super 750, Super 500, Super 300 (part of the HSBC World Tour), and the BWF Tour Super 100.

Men's singles
Year	Tournament	Level	Opponent	Score	Result	Ref.
2026	Kaohsiung Masters	Super 100	(South Korea) Kim Hae-deun	21–13, 21–19	(gold) Winner	

=== BWF International Challenge/Series (2 runners-up) ===
Men's singles
Year	Tournament	Opponent	Score	Result
2022	Bahrain International	(Malaysia) Ng Tze Yong	15–21, 22–20, 12–21	(silver) Runner-up
2023	Bonn International	(Chinese Taipei) Wang Po-wei	15–21, 10–21	(silver) Runner-up

BWF International Challenge tournament
BWF International Series tournament
BWF Future Series tournament
