= JianHao Tan =

Singaporean YouTube personality (born 1993)

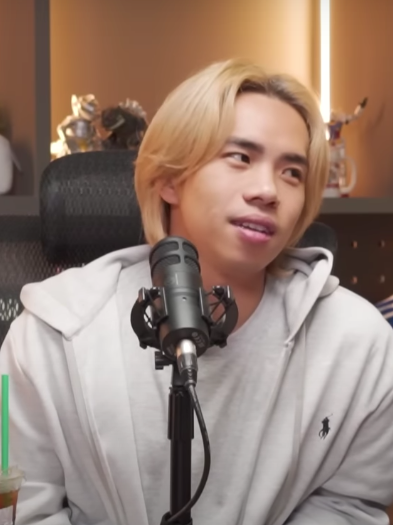
- Tan in 2024
- Born: 14 June 1993 (age 33); Singapore
- Education: United Nations International School of Hanoi
- Occupations: YouTuber; director; film producer; actor; businessman
- Spouse: Debbie Soon (m. 2019)
- Children: Starley Tan

YouTube information
- Channel: JianHao Tan
- Years active: 2010 – present
- Genres: Sketch comedy; Vlogging; Gaming; Film
- Subscribers: 7.783 million
- Views: 3.74 billion

Chinese name
- Traditional Chinese: 陳建豪
- Simplified Chinese: 陈建豪
- Hanyu Pinyin: Chén Jiànháo
- Jyutping: Can4 Gin3 Hou4
- Hokkien POJ: Tân Kiàn-hô
- Last updated: 3 May 2024

JianHao Tan (born 14 June 1993) is a Singaporean YouTuber and the chief executive officer of Titan Digital Media. As of 17 November 2025, he has more than 7,783,000 subscribers and over 3 billion accumulative views for JianHao Tan Youtube channel alone as of November 2025 on YouTube and 729,000 followers on Instagram.

== Early life and education ==
Tan was born on 14 June 1993 in Singapore. His mother, Luwina Chong, a piano teacher, was born and raised in Hong Kong. At 8 years old, his father, Edmund, was posted to Cambodia by the Ministry of Foreign Affairs, and Tan moved there with his family. Several years later, his family moved to Hanoi, Vietnam, where he studied at the United Nations International School of Hanoi, graduating in 2011.

== Career ==
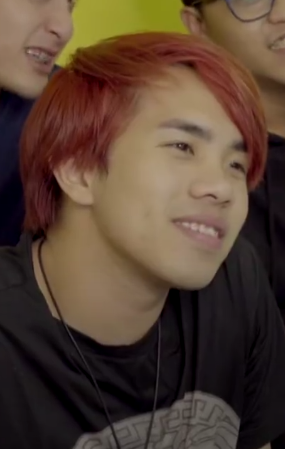
Tan in 2017

JianHao Tan started his YouTube channel in 2010 with two friends as a hobby, and also for a school project. He then served two years of National Service from when he was 18. Thereafter, Tan decided to make YouTube his full time career instead of pursuing further education in a university. He was mentored by Ryan Tan of Night Owl Cinematics sometime in 2014, and had more than 250,000 YouTube subscribers by December 2014.

=== Production company ===
Titan Digital Media, Ltd.
- Logo used since 2018
- Formerly: The JianHao Tan Co.
- Industry: Entertainment
- Founded: 2014
- Founder: JianHao Tan
- Headquarters: Tai Seng, Singapore
- Key people: JianHao Tan (CEO)
- Owner: GCL Global Holdings (85%); Debbie Soon (15%); (As of 2023)
- Subsidiaries: CrayEight Studios; (Owned by Ridhwan Azman)
- Website: titandigitalmedia.com

A S$15,000 job to promote an application in his channel in 2014 allowed him to make his first hire, and then subsequently founded The JianHao Tan Co, a production studio. In 2016, he was featured on the Forbes 30 Under 30 Asia list, under the "Media, Marketing & Advertising" category.

In 2018, Tan rebranded The JianHao Tan production studio into Titan Digital Media (TDM). Tan started the T1T5 web series, a precursor to the Titan Academy, a series of short comedic situational skits and roleplaying videos, in collaboration with other multiple YouTube personalities. Additionally, he started co-hosting the Playtime TV YouTube channel with a seven-year-old Cindy, targeting the children audience. TDM also received backing from GCL, Singapore-based digital entertainment holding group, in the same year.

In 2019, Tan launched a crowdfunding campaign to fund S$500,000 for a future movie set in the Titan Academy universe. The campaign received negative feedback from the public as it was deemed as targeting a non-financially independent target audience. Tan terminated the campaign and stated that the movie would be funded by himself.

In 2021, the company released Class Rush, a mobile endless runner game.

As of 1 November 2024, Tan has approximately 7.54 million YouTube subscribers.

In 2025, GCL went public on Nasdaq through merging with a special-purpose acquisition company.

Through Titan Digital Media, a dating sim game, Island of Hearts, featuring female content creators under the company would be launched in February 2026. While the game would be age restricted, generally at 16+, Tan had drawn criticism from other content creators for promoting the game though his social media accounts as his audiences are kids. However Keith Liu, the deputy CEO of GCL stated the posts were not shared on any "child-focused channels", were about the production process, and that Tan 'did nothing irresponsible'.

=== Other ventures ===
In 2022, Tan started a car dealership in Singapore.

== Personal life ==
Tan married Debbie Soon Rui Yi on 21 May 2019, after a three-year relationship. Tan's wedding proposal video was YouTube's most watched creators video in Singapore. They have a daughter named Starley, who was born on 19 September 2019.

Tan created The JianHao Tan Foundation in 2015. By 2019, the foundation had donated over $5,000 worth of food and toys to Thuy An Village, Vietnam.

== Filmography ==
=== Film ===
Year	Title	Role	Notes	Ref
2013	Everybody's Business	Eddy		
2015	Lingo Lingo, Where You Go	Male lead	Short Film	
2016	Lulu the Movie	Restaurant Waiter	Cameo Appearance	
2021	I am a Teacher	Himself	Cameo appearance; Director; Global Shorts Award, March 2021 - Excellence Award; Short Film	
TBA	School Trip	Himself	Delayed due to the COVID-19 pandemic; However in 2023, JianHao dropped an episode that is similar to the cancelled movie for their 100th episode. This time, in a cruise.	
2025	Island Of Hearts	Himself	Filming the game; Cameo appearance	

=== YouTube channels ===
Year	Channels	About	Notes
2018 - Present	JianHao Tan	Titan Academy	Season 1-present
2013 - Present	Jebbey Family	JianHao Family	
2021 - Present	Hao	JianHao Tan Second Channel	
2019 - Present	Team Titan	Titan Digital Media Talents	
2019 - Present	Ladies First	Women Empowerment	
