= Asia Pacific Activities Conference =

Tournament information
- Sport: Rugby, Soccer, Volleyball, Badminton, Basketball, Tennis, Baseball, Robotics, Softball, Track and Field, Cross Country, Swimming; Band, Dance, Choir, Theater, Orchestra
- Location: cycles between the Asia and Pacific International Schools
- Administrator: APAC Board of Associations

The Asia Pacific Activities Conference (APAC) is an extracurricular athletics and arts program for international schools in the Asia-Pacific area. APAC was founded in 1995 with the purpose of providing an "interesting, well-rounded extra-curricular program for international schools in the Asia-Pacific area". For the years that the APAC events have taken place, there have been sports tournaments and arts exchanges involving international schools from China, Hong Kong, Japan, South Korea, Vietnam, and the Philippines. Every year a different school in different locations in Asia and the Pacific will host various APAC tournaments, thus students from international schools get the opportunity to travel within Asia-Pacific to not only compete in athletics and in the arts, but also experience new cultures and destinations. Being selected as part of the APAC delegates of a school is a privilege and the chosen participants are usually part of a school's varsity team or the like.

== History ==
In 1993, activities directors from Brent International School Manila and Canadian Academy met. They discussed the prospect of friendly international competition between their schools. This conversation led to the founding of the Asia Pacific Activities Conference in 1995.

This international extra-curricular program started with sports and five schools. Seoul Foreign School joined Brent, Canadian Academy, International School of Beijing, Shanghai American School-Puxi, and Osaka International School as the sixth member in 1997.

APAC has strived to offer a well-rounded range of events since its start. First came volleyball, basketball and soccer tournaments. Choir became the first non-competitive event in 1997. The organization added more athletic competitions and performing art exchanges in the following years. (See competitions and performing arts below).

APAC events were great opportunities for arts and sports exchange between the schools involved. It garnered the attention of many international schools in the Asia-Pacific area. In 2008, APAC welcomed Hong Kong International School, Shanghai American School-Pudong, Taejon Christian International School, Western Academy of Beijing, American International School of Guangzhou, and Concordia International School Shanghai into the fold. The United Nations School in Hanoi joined in 2010, completing APAC's expansion to a 12-school format.

== Participating schools ==
School	Acronym	Mascot
Western Academy of Beijing	WAB	Tigers
International School of Beijing	ISB	Dragons
Seoul Foreign School	SFS	Crusaders
Canadian Academy Kobe	CA	Falcons
Shanghai American School Pudong	SASPD	Eagles
Shanghai American School Puxi	SASPX	Eagles
Hong Kong International School	HKIS	Dragons
United Nations International School of Hanoi	UNIS	Phoenix
Brent International School Manila	BISM	Lions
Concordia International School Shanghai	CISS	Phoenix
American International School of Guangzhou	AISG	Rams
Taejon Christian International School	TCIS	Dragons

Several times every year each school will either send a team to another international school (for a specific APAC competition) or host an APAC competition. The hosting school will usually provide accommodation for the visiting APAC teams through homestays, a process where visiting students are assigned to a host-student's house.

Each of the mentioned international schools compete in various athletic, arts and music competitions (all called APAC) throughout the school year (August – June). Each competition is hosted by a different school every year, and often because there is such a large number of schools competing in APAC, the tournaments are broken into two tournaments hosting six schools (instead of one tournament hosting twelve schools).

== APAC divisions ==
For most of the activities, there are two divisions: the Asia and Pacific division. The schools in a division are different every year, so participants will have a chance to meet other people from different schools. Every four years there is a "Super APAC" conference including all participating schools for the activities where there are two divisions.

== Competitions and Performing Arts ==
Visual and Performing Arts (Non-Competitive)

Type: Arts	Description	Time of Year
String Orchestra	APAC Orchestra	First Season (November)
Chamber Choir	APAC Choir	First Season (November)
Dance	APAC Dance	First Season (November)
Concert Band	APAC Band	Second Season (February)
Drama	APAC Theatre	Second Season (February)

These activities are non-competitive and do not involve special recognition or awards for outstanding delegates. It is a culmination of two and a half days of rehearsals and the final performance held on the third day. In theatre, the host school assign participating schools a theme in which they are required to write and act out the script. Dance has a similar system, where the directors of a participating school choreographs a dance. For orchestra, band and choir, a selection of music from different genres, mostly classical will be performed along with the other participating schools. In addition, for choir, each school also performs two songs of their own choosing. Host schools invite conductors from around the world to lead the delegates in their repertoire.

Athletics (Competitive)

Type: Sports	Description	Time of Year
Baseball	APAC Baseball	First Season (October)
Cross Country	APAC Cross Country	First Season (October)
Volleyball	APAC Volleyball	First Season (October)
Tennis	APAC Tennis	First Season (October)
Touch rugby	APAC Touch rugby	Second Season (January)
Swimming	APAC Swimming	Second Season (January)
Basketball	APAC Basketball	Second Season (January)
Table Tennis	APAC Table Tennis	Second Season (January)
Badminton	APAC Badminton	Third Season (April)
Soccer	APAC Soccer	Third Season (April)
Softball	APAC Softball (girls only)	Third Season (April)
Robotics	APAC Robotics	Third Season (April)
Track and Field	APAC Track and Field	Third Season (April)

Results of all APAC tournaments.

== APAC and corresponding time of year ==
Every year the next APAC is planned at least a year in advance, therefore even though each APAC may not be on the same exact dates as the ones before, they will be around the same time of the month. The following times for APAC are by month because there is not usually a concrete date for each and every APAC that will be held, although they always occur within the same month.

The corresponding time for APAC for all sports in the first season is October (e.g. Cross country, Volleyball and Tennis), APAC for all sports that are in the second season occurs in February (e.g. Basketball, touch rugby); and APAC for all third season sports is in April (e.g. soccer/football and badminton).
