= So Drama! Entertainment =

Singaporean media company

So Drama! Entertainment Pte Ltd
- Type: private limited company
- Industry: Entertainment; Mass media Interactive media Media consultancy
- Headquarters: 5 Depot Road, Defence Technology Tower B, #12-04, Singapore 109681
- Area served: Singapore
- Owner: SAFRA
- Website: sodrama.sg

So Drama! Entertainment (previously SAFRA Radio) is a Singapore media company owned by SAFRA National Service Association. In their portfolio are four brands - 883Jia, Power 98, Music and Drama Company and PIONEER.

== PIONEER ==
Owned and managed by So Drama! Entertainment, PIONEER provides news on the Ministry of Defence (MINDEF) and the Singapore Armed Forces (SAF), and general defence and defence technology news. Originally a print magazine, it went fully digital in 2019.

== Music and Drama Company ==
The Music and Drama Company (MDC) was first formed by Defence Minister Goh Keng Swee in 1973 to boost the morale of Singapore Armed Forces' soldiers through live entertainment and educating them on national duty.

MDC expanded in 1992 to include a choir, a chamber ensemble and a Chinese orchestra. MDC is based in Nee Soon Camp and has music studios and a dance studio.

Its radio programme, Forces 55, aired on SBC radio between 1977 and October 1994. The radio programme ended due to the launch of Power 98.

Notable former members includes rapper Sheikh Haikel, comedian and director Jack Neo, singer and actor Gurmit Singh and musical artist Dick Lee.

== Radio ==
Formerly known as SAFRA Radio, it was renamed as So Drama! Entertainment in 2017. According to the company, it chose the name “So Drama!” because "it’s a quintessentially Singaporean phrase that describes something which moves and amuses you".

The company runs two radio stations – 88.3Jia and Power 98 Love Songs. 88.3Jia began broadcast in 1995, before relaunching in 2007 as Singapore's only bilingual station in Chinese and English. Power 98, meanwhile, was founded a year earlier in 1994; it relaunched to the current name in 2019, becoming the first and only English station in Singapore dedicated to love songs 24 hours a day.

Additional stations from both 88.3Jia and Power 98 can be heard through their digital portal Camokakis, which include stations dedicated to various genres like K-pop and classic hits.

In June 2025, the Camokakis app was rebranded to Kakee, adding a loyalty program where users can earn "koins" that can be redeemed for rewards, as well as short-form video content and games. Concurrently, So Drama are migrating all of their radio station to the Kakee app as their terrestrial radio operations ends on 30 October 2025, with its broadcasting license and franchise to own and operate radio stations being cancelled and surrendered to and its former frequencies being recalled by IMDA.

=== Internet stations ===
Station	Language	Genre	First air date	Website
883Jia	Mandarin; English	Soft adult contemporary	12 June 1995	Website
Power 98	English	Adult hits	31 October 1994	Website
