= Duncan Watt =

Singaporean author and newscaster

- Born: 1942; Northern Rhodesia
- Died: 7 September 2017 (aged 74); Singapore
- Occupation(s): Author, newscaster, radio presenter

Duncan Watt (1943–2017) was a Singaporean author, newscaster and radio presenter. A local household name in the 1980s to 1990s, Watt read the primetime news on Channel 5 for the then Singapore Broadcasting Corporation (SBC) from 1980 to 1998 as well as presented classical music on Symphony 92.4FM for about 24 years until 2004. He was also known as the author of a series of young adult literature.

== Biography ==
Watt was born in Northern Rhodesia (modern-day Zambia) during British colonial rule and grew up as an only child to British parents. Prior to making Singapore his long term home, he had travelled to more than 80 countries and first visited the country in 1969 before deciding to settle there in 1976.

In addition to his career as a newscaster, he held a position with the British Council until 1992. He was also the author of twenty titles in the Wallace Boys series, which follow the adventures of brothers Nigel and Bruce Wallace in locations such as Lake Kariba in Zimbabwe, the Skeleton Coast in Namibia and the Scottish Highlands.

Watt was diagnosed with liver cancer in June 2016. He died on 7 September 2017 at the age of 74.

== Published works ==
=== The Wallace Boys series ===
- 1995: Skulduggery in the South Atlantic
- 1993: Sands of the Skeleton Coast
- 1991: Trouble in Tristan
- 1996: Legacy of Lobengula
- 1992: Killers against Kariba
- 1991: Kidnapped in the Kafue
- 1993: Crash in the Caprivi
- 2010: Mischief in “The Mousetrap”
- 1995: Hostage in the Highlands
- 2010: Assignment in the Alps
- 2010: Traitors in the Tyrol
- 2000: Rebels Across the Red Sea
- 2000: Rebels Across the Red Sea II: Nemesis of the Nefud
- 2001: Rebels Across the Red Sea III: The Terrorists of Tibesti
- 2010: The Monks of Montafon
- 2010: South from the Seychelles
- 1994: Treasure of the Tiger
- 1996: Pagodas of Pahang
- 1997: Sultan of the Sulu Sea
- 2000: Missing in the Mekong

=== Other works ===
- 1970: Caprivi crash
- 1970: Kafue killers
- 1974: Hijacked in Borneo
- 1976: Hijacked in Kalimantan
