= Sankar Subramanian =

Indian badminton player (born 2004)

Personal information
- Born: S. Sankar Muthusamy Subramanian; 13 January 2004 (age 22) Chennai, Tamil Nadu, India

Sport
- Country: India
- Sport: Badminton
- Handedness: Left

Men's singles
- Highest ranking: 55 (6 May 2025)
- Current ranking: 71 (2 June 2026)
- BWF profile
Medal record
Men's badminton
Representing India
World Junior Championships
Silver medal – second place	2022 Santander	Boys' singles

S. Sankar Muthusamy Subramanian (born 13 January 2004) is an Indian badminton player from Tamil Nadu. He is a former world junior number 1 in the boys' singles.

Subramanian is from Chennai. He trains under Aravindan Samiappan at the Fireball Badminton Academy in Chennai which he joined in 2009.

At the age of 17, he reached the finals of a senior tournament, the 2021 Uganda International. In November 2022, he won the silver medal at the 2022 World Junior Championships at Santander, Spain.

In 2021, he won the Junior White Nights tournament in Russia. In the same year, he also won the Iran Junior international series.

In March 2025, being ranked only 64th in the world, he beat the then world No. 2 Anders Antonsen 18–21, 21–12, 21–5 in 66 minutes.

== Achievements ==
=== World Junior Championships ===
Boys' singles
Year	Venue	Opponent	Score	Result	Ref.
2022	Palacio de Deportes de Santander; Santander, Spain	(Chinese Taipei) Kuo Kuan-lin	14–21, 20–22	Silver	

=== BWF International Challenge/Series (1 title, 2 runners-up) ===
Men's singles
Year	Tournament	Opponent	Score	Result	Ref.
2021	Uganda International	(India) Varun Kapur	18–21, 21–16, 17–21	(silver) Runner-up	
2023	Luxembourg Open	(Azerbaijan) Ade Resky Dwicahyo	21–11, 21–19	(gold) Winner	
2023	Scottish Open	(Denmark) Mads Christophersen	16–21, 14–21	(silver) Runner-up	

BWF International Challenge tournament
BWF International Series tournament
BWF Future Series tournament

=== BWF Junior International (2 titles) ===
Boys' singles
Year	Tournament	Opponent	Score	Result
2021	Russian Junior International	(India) Saneeth Dayanand	21–10, 21–13	(gold) Winner
2022	Iran Junior International	(Iran) Ali Hayati	21–17, 21–17	(gold) Winner

BWF Junior International Grand Prix tournament
BWF Junior International Challenge tournament
BWF Junior International Series tournament
BWF Junior Future Series tournament
