= Ryan Tan =

Singaporean content creator

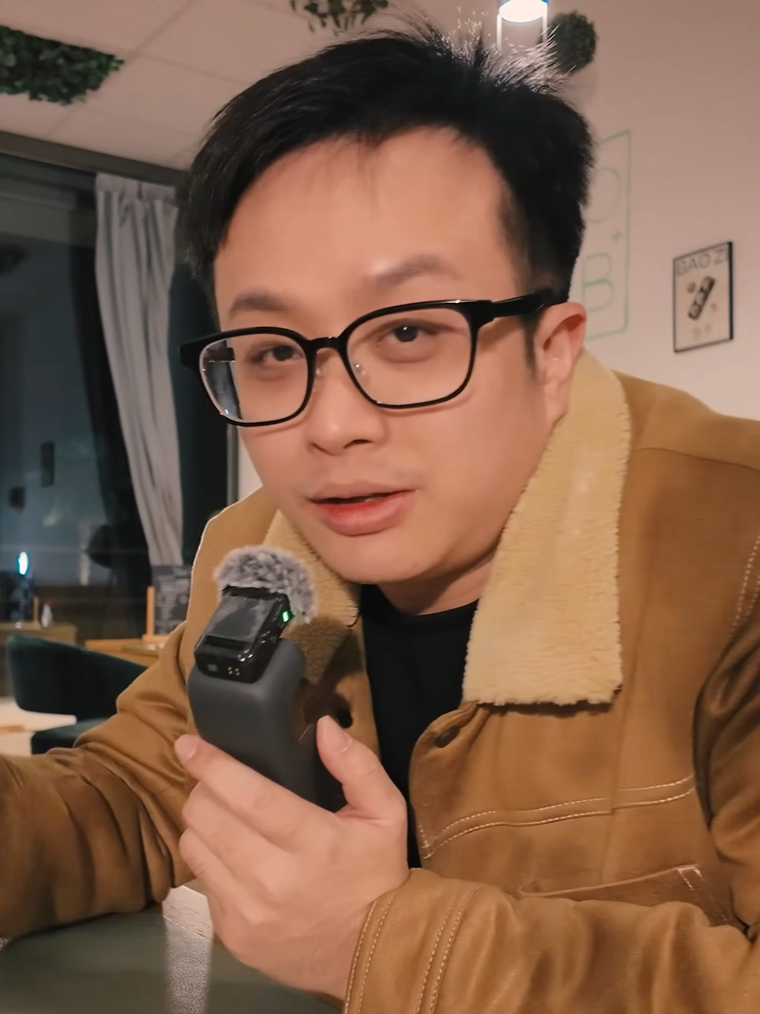
- Tan in 2025
- Born: 1 August 1988 (age 38); Singapore
- Citizenship: Singaporean
- Occupations: Content creator; Businessman
- Years active: 2012–present
- Spouse: Sylvia Chan (m. 2010; div. 2020)
- Partner: Cherylene Chan (2021–present)

Ryan Tan (Chinese: 陈伟文; pinyin: Chén Wěiwén; born 1 August 1988) is a Singaporean content creator and businessman.

== Career ==
Circa 2013, Ryan Tan ran a franchise each of Western food eatery New York New York at Parkway Parade as well as Malaysian food restaurant Shi Wei Tian at Joo Chiat Place together with Sylvia Chan. The food business failed, resulting in Tan chalking up debts, and the couple pivoted to do wedding videography in 2012 and subsequently content creation on YouTube under the channel Night Owl Cinematics (NOC). Tan served as the cinematographer, art director and occasionally cameoed in their early productions wearing a watermelon helmet as he had issues appearing in front of the camera proper. In 2016, the couple was named in Forbes Asia's' 30 under 30.

In 2021, allegations were made on the operations of NOC, primarily against Chan. It was revealed Tan had tried to resign as NOC's director in May 2021 and was not involved with the company's management thereafter. However, due to the allegations, Tan resumed his directorship. On 19 January 2022, Tan resigned from his role in NOC.

In an October 2021 interview with Xiaxue, Sylvia Chan alleged infidelity on the part of Tan, and indirectly drawing attention Tan's current relationship with another content creator, Cherylene Chan. Cherylene would defend her relationship with Tan, calling the interview as "filled with a lot of lies". In the same podcast, other allegations were made: Tan hacked Sylvia's computer; Tan was the sole director; making use of NOC's resources to establish a separate channel and company, Reno King; a dispute over profit-sharing of Reno King; Tan locking Sylvia out of the company's finances; as well as asking for "millions" to buy his shares of the company out. Tan responded that he had not hack her computer; Tan was the sole director as Sylvia wasn't a Singaporean citizen yet when the company was set up and she refused to take up the directorship when he tried to resigned in May 2021; due to allegation of misuse of funds, he had instructed the finance team to clear all requests with him first; as an agreement was made on 8 May 2021 to dissociate Reno King from NOC while sharing 20% of Reno King's profit to NOC; and he would transfer 29% of the company shares owned by him for a "fair" amount with him retaining 20% while resigning from his directorship and not interfere with the daily operations of the company.

In November 2021, Tan started a new production company, Overkill and currently runs a YouTube channel, as well as a brand experience and design agency, Remake. Sponsors and friends offered their assistance to help him set up the new office, as his cashflow was being constricted. At the same time, Tan was still entangled in lawsuits brought on by NOC over Reno King. Tan would also host YouTube Chinese talk-show series, R U Okay, with other content creators from various agencies, GRVTY Media, OverKill and DoubleUp.

In 2024, a Tan started a website, EZiD, matching homeowners with curated interior designers. The website was created after he encountered interior designers who were salespersons and not actual designers while filming home tours as one of his content pillars and that had left him with negative experiences.

== Personal life ==
Ryan Tan met Sylvia Chan when both were doing part-time modelling at age 16. The duo started to date 5 years later and eventually got married at 22. On 31 May 2020, the couple announced that their divorce was finalised in March 2020 after being separated for three years.

Ryan Tan started dating Cherylene Chan, a content creator who was under JianHao Tan's management, after his divorce. The relationship was made public in October 2021 amidst the controversy that Night Owl Cinematics was embroiled in. In December 2025, Tan proposed to Cherylene Chan in Switzerland of which she accepted.
