= Broadcasting Act 1996 =

Act of the Parliament of the United Kingdom

Broadcasting Act 1996 (Note: Section 150(1).)
- Act of Parliament
- Parliament of the United Kingdom
- Long title: An Act to make new provision about the broadcasting in digital form of television and sound programme services and the broadcasting in that form on television or radio frequencies of other services; to amend the Broadcasting Act 1990; to make provision about rights to televise sporting or other events of national interest; to amend in other respects the law relating to the provision of television and sound programme services; to provide for the establishment and functions of a Broadcasting Standards Commission and for the dissolution of the Broadcasting Complaints Commission and the Broadcasting Standards Council; to make provision for the transfer to other persons of property, rights and liabilities of the British Broadcasting Corporation relating to their transmission network; and for connected purposes.
- Citation: 1996 c. 55
- Introduced by: Richard Fletcher-Vane, 2nd Baron Inglewood, Parliamentary Under-Secretary of State (Department of National Heritage) (Lords)
- Territorial extent: United Kingdom (Note: Section 150(2).)

Dates
- Royal assent: 24 July 1996
- Commencement: Various (Note: Section 149.)
Other legislation
Amends	Broadcasting Act 1990
Amended by	Political Parties, Elections and Referendums Act 2000; Capital Allowances Act 2001; Digital Economy Act 2010; Digital Economy Act 2017

Status: Amended

Records of Parliamentary debate relating to the statute from Hansard

Text of statute as originally enacted

Text of the Broadcasting Act 1996 as in force today (including any amendments) within the United Kingdom, from legislation.gov.uk.

The Broadcasting Act 1996 (c. 55) is an act of the Parliament of the United Kingdom. The act, among other things, amended the Broadcasting Act 1990, and made provision for the Ofcom Code on Sports and Other Listed and Designated Events.

== Provisions ==
The act forms part of broadcast law in the UK. The act is most notable for its creation of Ofcom's listed sporting events which are events of national interest which are given protected status.

The act also amends the Broadcasting Act 1990 to in regards to the funding model for Channel 4.

The act creates a framework for broadcast development, sets out the merger of Broadcasting Standards Council and the Broadcasting Complaints Commission to form the Broadcasting Standards Commission, and the transfer of property, rights and liabilities relating to the BBC networks.

Additionally, the act makes provision for digital television broadcasting.
