= Power 98 (radio station) =

Radio station in Singapore

- Singapore

Programming
- Format: Adult contemporary
- Affiliations: SAFRA National Service Association

Ownership
- Owner: So Drama! Entertainment
- Sister stations: 883Jia

History
- First air date: 31 October 1994; 31 years ago
- Former frequencies: 98.0 MHz in Singapore, Johor Bahru District/Johor Bahru, Johor, Malaysia and parts of Bintan, Riau, Batam, Indonesia (Love Songs, 1994–2025)

Technical information
- Licensing authority: IMDA
- Transmitter coordinates: 1.30683°N 103.88698°E

Links
- Website: https://www.kakee.sg

Power 98 is an English-language internet radio station (until 2025, an FM radio station) operated by So Drama! Entertainment in Singapore. Formerly broadcast on 98 megacycles, it broadcasts 24 hours a day, featuring contemporary pop music, entertainment news, and sports updates.

== History ==
Plans for Power 98 were announced in January 1994 at the opening of Safra Resort and Country Club, with a start-up cost of $3.3 million from the Ministry of Defence. The station targeted male listeners aged 18 to 35, considered an under-served market. It initially recruited seven deejays, all in their twenties, with experience in hosting programs at private events and nightclubs. Power 98 initially broadcast from 6 am to 12 am, with music comprising four-fifths of its programming, mainly hits from the 1980s and 1990s, alongside news, defence-related information, and entertainment segments. A bilingual lunch-time show, Power Lunch, allowed listeners to request Mandarin songs. The station launched on 31 October 1994 at 7 am, officiated by Minister Lee Boon Yang.

On 19 March 2012, Power 98 underwent its first major revamp in 18 years, adopting the slogan "Hear The Difference," with a new lineup of DJs and programs. In 2019, it rebranded as Power 98 Love Songs, alongside two internet radio services: Power 98 Raw (contemporary hits) and Power 98 Retro (adult hits).

In June 2025, So Drama! Entertainment announced both Power 98 and its sister station 883Jia would cease their FM broadcast on 30 October 2025, with their stations fully migrated as online-only radio through its newly-rebranded "Kakee" app. Its broadcasting licenses and franchises to own and operate radio stations were revoked, and the former frequencies were recalled by IMDA.

== See also ==
- List of radio stations in Singapore
