= Giancarlo Santalmassi =

Italian journalist (1941–2025)

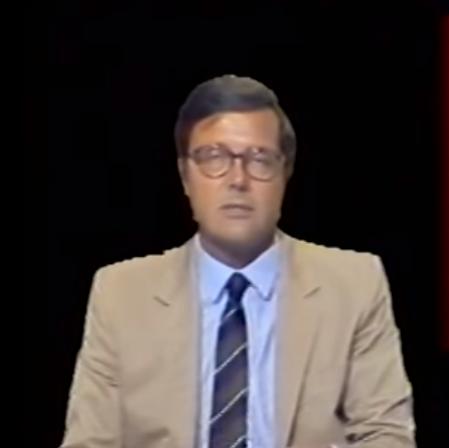
Giancarlo Santalmassi in 1983

Giancarlo Santalmassi (20 October 1941 – 4 June 2025) was an Italian journalist and radio presenter, from 2005 to 2008 he was the editor-in-chief of Radio 24.

== Life and career ==
Santalmassi joined RAI in 1961. He was the first Italian journalist, after his appointment as head of service, who proposed an American-style TG host.

On the morning of 16 March 1978, he was the first to announce on television (extraordinary edition of TG2, 10:01:30 am) the news of the kidnapping of Aldo Moro and the annihilation of his escort by the Red Brigades, a case that was followed by him day by day until the discovery (9 May) of the statesman's body.

Other events he reported include the attack on Pope John Paul II (13 May 1981) and the tragedy of Vermicino (11–14 June 1981), followed for three days live on television by the entire country.

Between 1992 and the beginning of 1993 he edited two editions of Nonsolofilm - Voglio scoprir l'America, a film cycle with a studio debate focused on the USA, on the occasion of the five hundredth anniversary of the Discovery of America.

In 1994 he was appointed deputy director of GR RAI and in 1998 director of Radio RAI. In those years he inaugurated and hosted the radio program Zapping.

In 1999 he moved to Radio 24, where he hosted the broadcasts Viva Voce (political talk show) and Hellzapoppin'. In 2000 the story of the Italian-American Derek Rocco Barnabei followed, accused of murder and subsequently sentenced to death after a questionable trial. In the 22 March 2002 episode of Viva Voce, the former President of the Republic Francesco Cossiga heavily criticized Antonio D'Amato, then president of Confindustria (Radio 24's owner). For this reason, in 2003 he was removed from radio.

He returned in October 2005 and took over the direction of the programs and the newspaper. He immediately introduced an innovative (for radio) column of Letters to the Editor. He revived the Viva Voce program, later assigned to Alessandro Milan. He also edited the program Una poltrona per due for some time.

During the broadcast of 5 April 2006 he was the protagonist of a live quarrel with Giulio Tremonti. After this he would be removed from conducting the program.

Santalmassi died on 4 June 2025, at the age of 83.
