= Taejon Christian International School =

Location
- 77 Yongsan 2-ro, Yuseong Gu; Daejeon, 34035; South Korea; 36°24′57.07″N 127°23′57.52″E

Information
- Other name: TCIS
- Former name: Korea Christian Academy / Taejon Foreign School
- Type: International School, Boarding School, Private School
- Motto: LEARN • LOVE • LEAD
- Religious affiliation: Christian
- Denomination: Non-denominational
- Established: 1958
- Head of school: Michael Moimoi
- Grades: PreK-12
- Enrollment: ~550
- Average class size: 12
- Student to teacher ratio: 7:1
- Education system: IB Curriculum (PYP, MYP, DP)
- Language: English
- Campus size: 10 acres
- Colors: Black & Gold
- Athletics conference: APAC & KAIAC
- Mascot: The Dragons
- Accreditation: Western Association of Schools and Colleges
- Yearbook: Kulsai
- Website: www.tcis.or.kr

Taejon Christian International School (TCIS; Korean: 대전외국인학교) is a Pre-K to Grade 12 international school located in an area known as Techno Valley, a neighborhood in the northern part of Daejeon, South Korea. TCIS is a Three-Programme IB World School and provides boarding care through on-campus dormitory facilities. The school serves foreign families living locally for work, families living abroad and looking for education in Korea, and local Korean families. Taejon Christian International School also plays a partnership role in globalization efforts in the city of Daejeon.

In 2025, amendments to the relevant special-zone legislation and a Daejeon municipal ordinance removed the previous three-year overseas-residence requirement for Korean applicants and increased the permitted proportion of Korean students from 30% to 50%.

Taejon Christian International School is a non-profit educational institution.

== Accreditation and authorization ==
- In 1973, TCIS gained accreditation by the Western Association of Schools and Colleges (WASC) to deliver a western-style education to children in grades K-12. This accreditation covers academic programs and the on-campus boarding program. As of 2021, TCIS is the only school in Daejeon, South Korea, to be authorized by WASC.
- In 1999, TCIS received official certification from the Korean Ministry of Education as a foreign school.
- TCIS is authorized by the International Baccalaureate (IB) as a Three Programme World School. It received authorization for the Diploma Programme in 2004, the Primary Years Programme in 2008, and the Middle Years Programme in 2012. TCIS was the first school in Korea to become authorized for all three IB programs and, as of 2021, stood as one of seven international schools in Korea to have three-program authorization. In 2019, the IB Director General, Siva Kumari, visited South Korea as part of a growing partnership between the IB and Korean government offices to introduce aspects of the IB curriculum in public schools.

== History ==
TCIS is one of the oldest international schools in Korea, with connections going back to 1900 with Pyongyang Foreign School (PFS). Pyongyang was commonly known as the "Jerusalem of the East", due to the success of (largely) Presbyterian and joint missionary work in the city. PFS was an American, Presbyterian-run school for missionary children. They began with families from Canada, Australia, Korea, China, and Japan, and grew over the following years. The need was for western-style education to support the foreign and locally-partnered missionary children. Pyongyang Foreign School closed in 1940 in anticipation of war between the United States and Japan.

Ruth Bell Graham (wife of renowned Christian evangelist Billy Graham) and her sister Virginia Bell Somerville attended Pyongyang Foreign School for some time while their family served as missionaries in China. In later years, Billy Graham would go to evangelize in North Korea. Virginia Bell Somerville would return to South Korea with her husband John, serving as missionaries with the Presbyterian Church, for forty years. During that time, the Somervilles would be leaders in creating the school that would continue the PFS mission and would become Taejon Christian International School. In 1958, with cooperation among various mission organizations in Korea, Taejon Foreign School was established in Daejeon, on Presbyterian mission property in O-Jung-dong. Two years later, the school name was changed to Korea Christian Academy. In 1993, it changed once more to Taejon Christian International School.

In 1997, Virginia Somerville wrote an article for the TCIS Views and Visions newsletter about a reunion of PFS students, noting that "TCIS/KCA has really been the heir apparent of Pyongyang Foreign School by being today's Korean boarding school". TCIS also inherited PFS's yearbook name (Kulsai) and carried on the format of operating both a day and boarding school.

In September 2012, TCIS moved to its present location in Techno Valley. The school sits on a 10-acre campus, acquired in partnership with Daejeon city government authorities, in alignment with city goals to improve the educational infrastructure for foreign families, so as to further attract foreign scientists and investors to the area.

In 2017, a Manhattan federal jury found William Cosme guilty of wire fraud after he defrauded TCIS of an estimated $5.5 million.

== Community partnerships ==
As an international boarding school, Taejon Christian International School holds a unique status for global education within the city of Daejeon. TCIS has formed public partnerships with offices and organizations to help further mutual goals for globalized science and education in the city of Daejeon. TCIS has formed MOU partnerships with these organizations:

- Korea Advanced Institute of Science & Technology (KAIST): In 2011, TCIS and KAIST signed an MOU for mutual education programs and personnel exchange, including the operation of international English science camps and provision of regular English curriculum for children of foreign researchers.
- Institute for Basic Science (IBS): In 2013, TCIS and IBS signed an MOU linked to the government's Brain Return 500 initiative, providing IB education and settlement support for children of foreign scientists, including those at IBS campuses in Gwangju and Daegu.
- Daejeon Metropolitan Office of Education: TCIS and the Daejeon Office of Education signed an MOU in 2016 for global education capacity building and educational exchange. As part of this partnership, a joint Good-Turn Workshop was held on November 25, 2021, via videoconference for 40 Daejeon elementary and middle school English teachers covering all three IB programmes (PYP, MYP, DP). Of the 22 participants who responded to the post-workshop survey, all expressed general satisfaction, and 95% found the content relevant to their understanding of the IB. Four teachers were subsequently selected to observe classes at TCIS in January 2022.

== Educational philosophy ==
TCIS is a non-denominational Christian school. In 1958, TCIS was created by the cooperation of missions organizations working in Korea. Today, TCIS delivers education according to a Christian worldview, claiming a Christian ethos as part of its organizational foundation and mission.

== Athletics and activities conferences ==
- Asia Pacific Activities Conference (APAC) – A collaborative and competitive international conference of 12 schools located around the Asia-Pacific region.
- Korean-American Interscholastic Activities Conference (KAIAC) – A Korea-based conference organization made up of international schools in Korea.

== Affiliations and memberships ==
- Western Association of Schools and Colleges (WASC)
- International Baccalaureate (IB)
- Association of Christian Schools International (ACSI)
- Association for Supervision and Curriculum Development (ASCD)
- College Board International
- East Asia Regional Council of Overseas Schools (EARCOS)
- National Association for College Admission Counseling (NACAC)
- International Association for College Admission Counseling (IACAC)

== Notable alumni ==
- Jennifer Song (송민영) – Professional golfer on the LPGA Tour.
- Paul Bin – NCAA Soccer Champion Forward for the University of Maryland, transferred from TCIS to Grande Sports Academy to pursue a soccer specialization opportunity with Real Salt Lake FC of Major League Soccer.
- Amy Hae Nyun Son – 2022 Gold Medal Award high school recipient at the Samsung Humantech Papers competition.
