= Shanghai American School =

International school in China

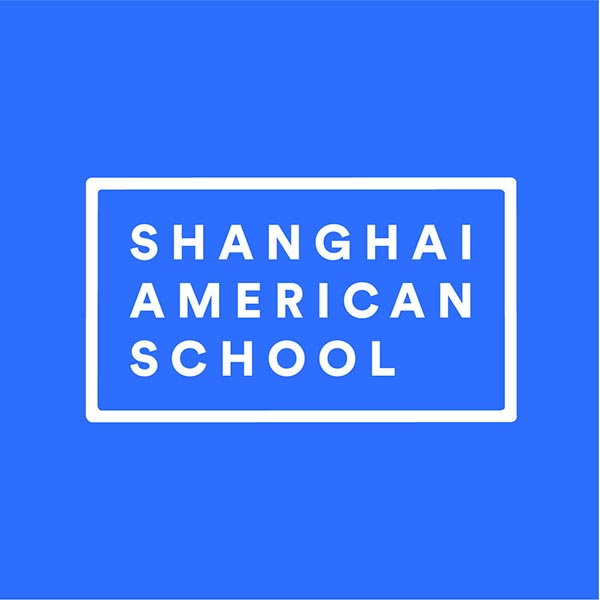

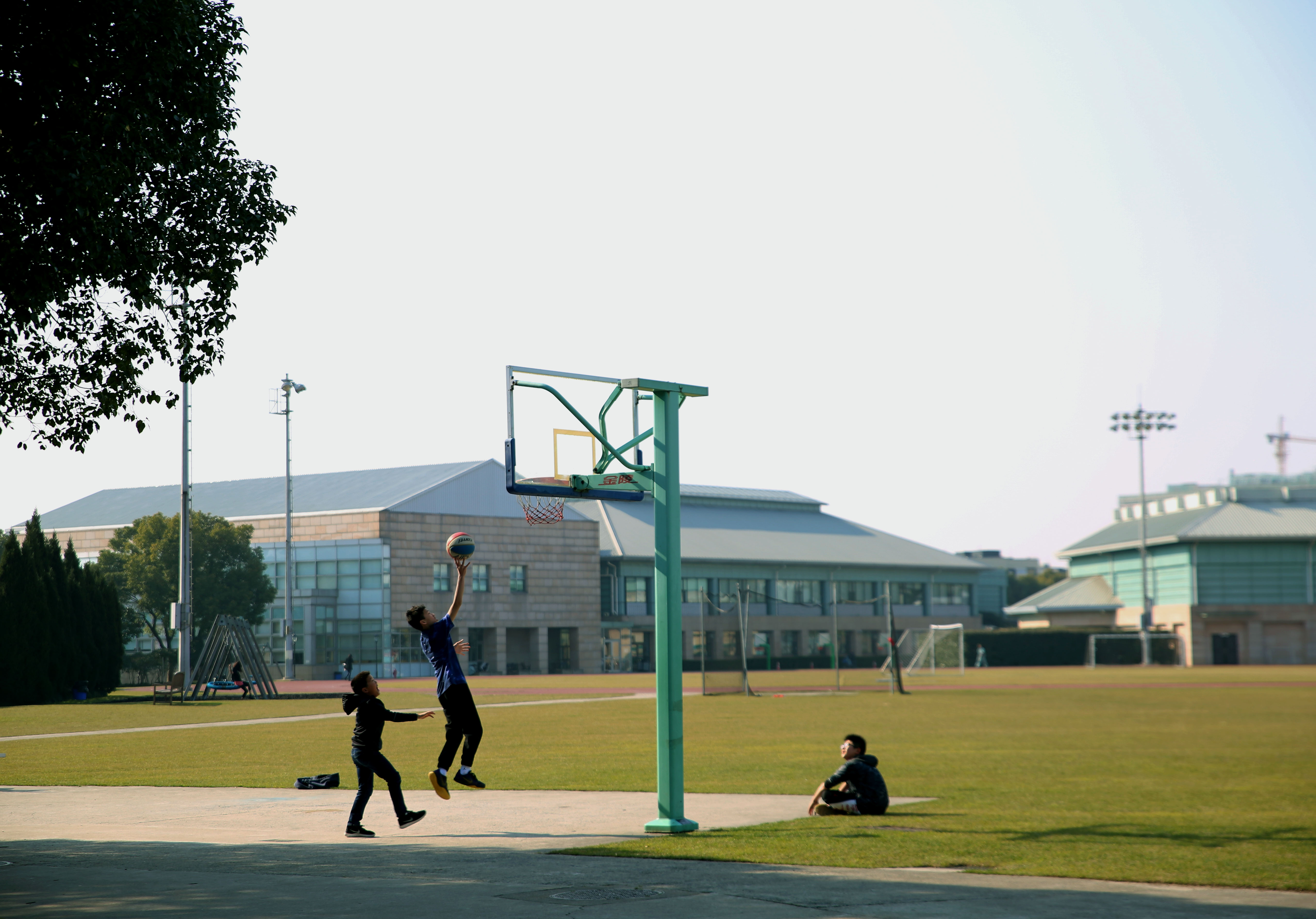
- Puxi campus

Location
- 1600 Lingbai Highway, Pudong; 258 Jinfeng Road, Minhang, Puxi; Shanghai; China

Information
- Former names: American Private School (1941–42); Community Private School (1942–43); Chapei Civilian Assembly Camp school (1943–45); Shanghai American Private School (1945–46); Private American School (1949–50)
- Type: Private, not-for-profit
- Motto: Possumus Quia Posse Videmur ("Since we think we can, we can.")
- Established: 1912
- Chair: Emily Chan
- Campus Director: Krista Zavits (Pudong); Christopher Henry (Puxi)
- Head of school: James Nelligan
- Faculty: 388 from 51 countries
- Grades: Pre-K-12
- Enrollment: 3047
- Campus size: 22 acres (Pudong); 29 acres (Puxi)
- Colors: Schoolwide Red Blue White; Puxi Red; Pudong Blue
- Athletics: Asia Pacific Activities Conference; Association of China and Mongolia International Schools; China International Schools Sports Association
- Nickname: Eagles
- Affiliations: Western Association of Schools and Colleges; College Board Advanced Placement; International Baccalaureate Diploma Programme; Principal Training Center
- Website: www.saschina.org

Chinese name
- Simplified Chinese: 上海美国外籍人员子女学校
- Traditional Chinese: 上海美國外籍人員子女學校
- Literal meaning: Shanghai United States Foreign Personnel Children's School
Transcriptions
Standard Mandarin
- Hanyu Pinyin: Shànghǎi Měiguó Wàijí Rényuán Zǐnǚ Xuéxiào

Alternative Chinese name
- Simplified Chinese: 上海美国学校
- Traditional Chinese: 上海美國學校
- Literal meaning: Shanghai United States School
Transcriptions
Standard Mandarin
- Hanyu Pinyin: Shànghǎi Měiguó Xuéxiào

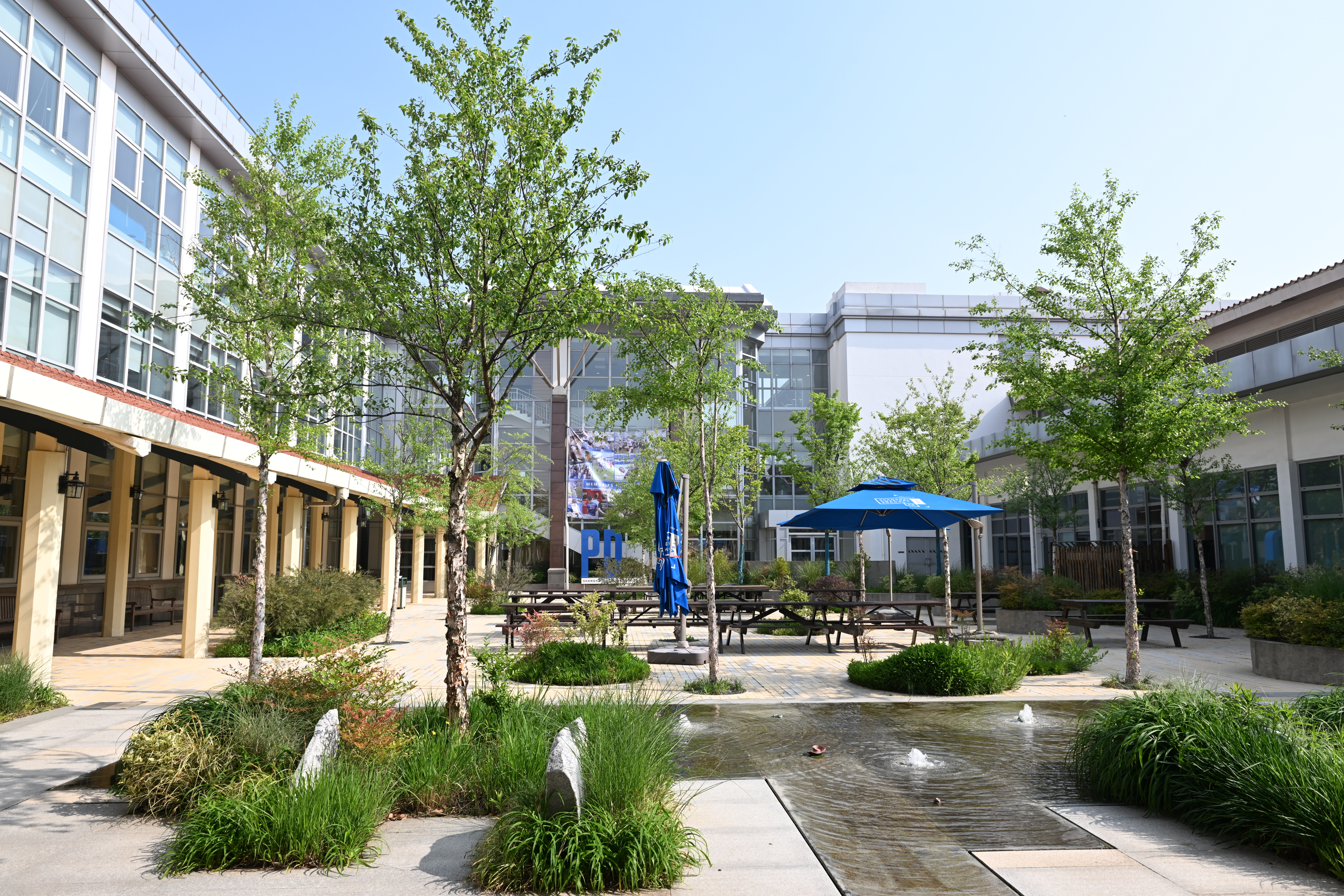
Pudong Campus

Shanghai American School (SAS; 上海美国外籍人员子女学校) is a private school for children of foreign personnel between Pre-K to grade 12. It is located in Shanghai, China. Founded in 1912, SAS has two campuses.

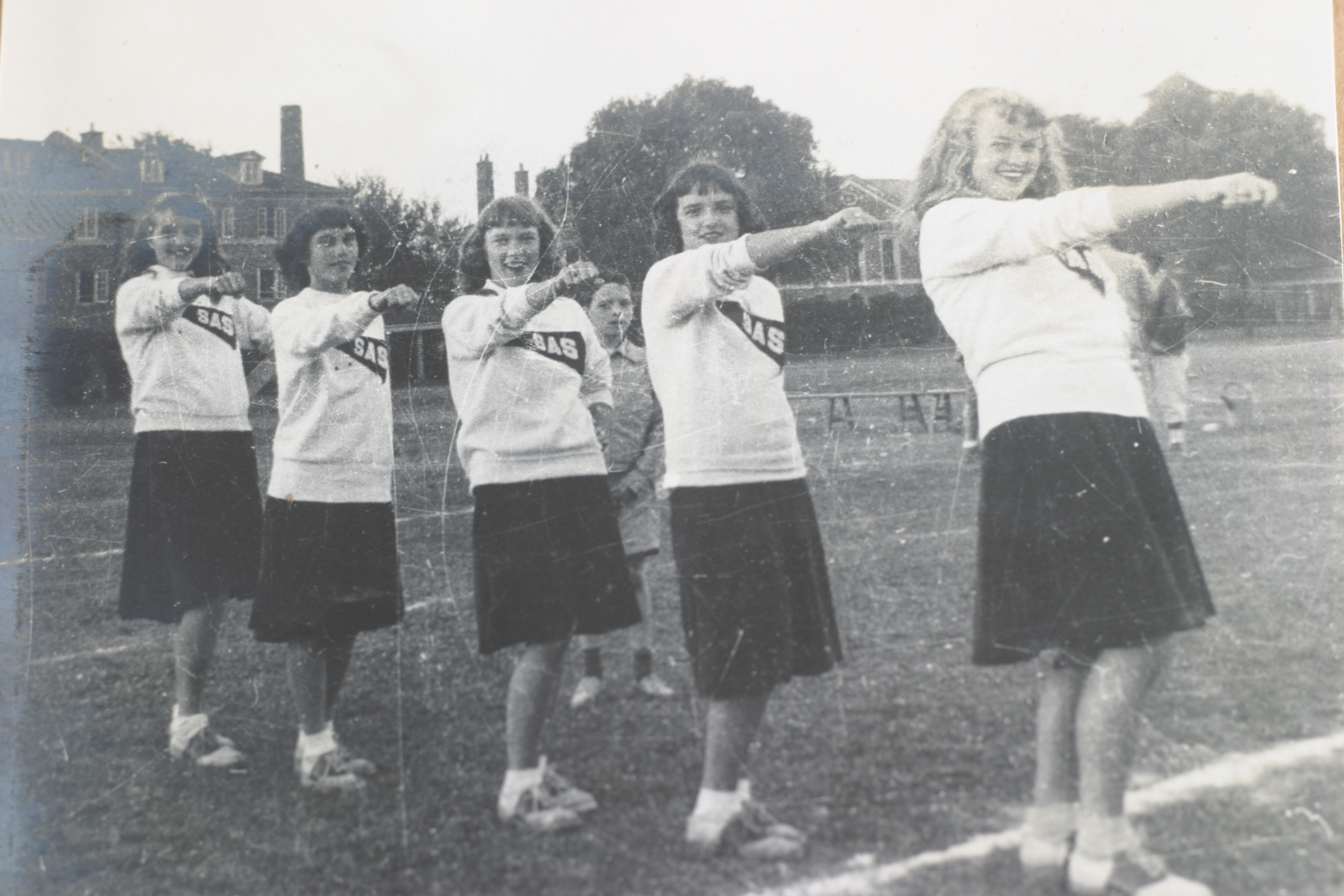
1949 SAS cheerleaders

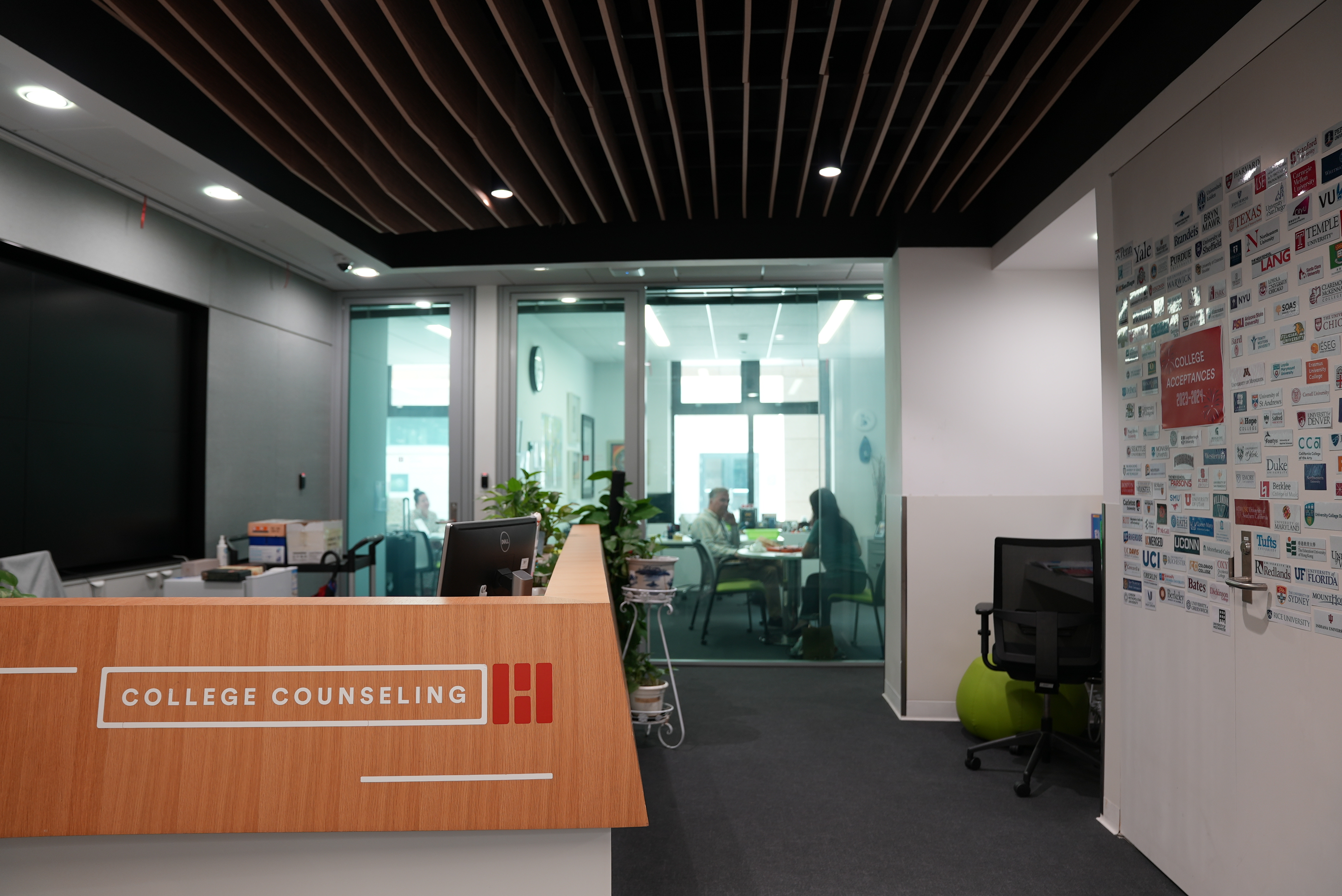
College Counseling Department, Puxi Campus

== History ==
Shanghai American School (SAS) was established in 1912 to serve the children of expatriates living in China, including business professionals and missionaries who sought to maintain educational ties to their home country. The school opened on September 17, 1912, with 38 day and boarding students in a Victorian residence on North Sichuan Road in Hongkou.

Shanghai American School (SAS) has been named the #1 High School in China by Forbes, Best International School in Shanghai by HURUN, #1 International School for Foreign Passport Holders in Mainland China by HKPEP, and 86th in the Top Global International School by HKPEP.

By 1917, enrollment had increased to approximately 150 students, enabling the development of organized athletics. Male students competed in football, baseball, and soccer against teams from the YCMA and the United States military, while female students participated in basketball. Student organizations emerged early in the school's history, including the Glee Club, the Good Times Club, and The Athenaeum, a high school society dedicated to intellectual and public discourse. During this period, students were not required to follow a dress code, although certain activities, such as ballroom dancing in dormitories, were prohibited.

The school graduated its first class with five boys and two girls in 1917. As enrollment continued to grow, SAS began planning for a purpose-built campus. The new facility opened in 1923 on Hengshang Road (then Avenue Petain) and became a central location for the school's pre-war community. Administrators during this era addressed challenges related to curriculum development, international teacher recruitment, and the departure of expatriate families during periods of political instability, including the Chinese Civil War.

A longstanding student tradition began in 1919 involving the transfer, theft, or concealment of a plaster bust of Juno between classes. Over the decades, the bust underwent various transformations and remains part of the school's cultural heritage, now located on the Pudong campus.

The school motto, Possumus Quia Posse Videmur ("Since we think we can, we can"), first appeared on yearbook covers approximately a century ago and continues to be associated with the institution.

In 1932, military conflict between Chinese and Japanese forces damaged the area surrounding the school's original site, though SAS continued to expand, adding a dormitory and sports facilities to support a student body of roughly 550. Renewed conflict during the Battle of Shanghai in August 1937 resulted in the death of one of the school's founders and prevented many students and faculty from returning to Shanghai after summer travel.

Frank "Uncle" Cheney, an experienced international educator with prior service in the Philippines and Turkey, played a significant role in maintaining school operations during this period. He was supported by the Rev. Val Sundt. Beginning in 1934, Cheney served in multiple capacities, including mechanical drawing teacher, dormitory supervisor, facilities manager, and later head of school. After SAS officially closed in April 1941, Cheney continued to operate a small institution on the same campus under the name "American Private School of Shanghai," later renamed "Community Private School" following the United States' entry into World War II.

After the war, SAS reopened with a diverse student body representing more than 25 nationalities, including individuals from countries that no longer existed as recognized states. Tuition remained at eight U.S. dollars per month, though additional funding was required to repair wartime damage. Students graduated in 1950, marking the beginning of a 30-year closure.

The normalization of Sino-American relations in 1979 led to the return of the U.S. consulate to Shanghai and renewed demand for American-style education. SAS reopened in a residential apartment using correspondence-course materials, later relocating to the dining hall of the U.S. Consulate on Huaihai Road. Under a decade of female leadership, the school expanded from 8 to 65 students, added grade levels, and moved to the Shanghai No. 3 Girls School campus.

By the mid-1990s, with students representing 20 countries and enrollment increasing, SAS again faced space constraints. The presence of high school boys on a campus belonging to an all-girls school prompted the decision to construct purpose -built facilities. Two new campuses were planned: one in Puxi and one in Pudong. Although Pudong was largely undeveloped farmland in 1990, the area soon attracted foreign companies and residential developments, creating demand for a nearby international school.

The Pudong campus broke ground in 1996 and opened in 1998. In 1997, SAS Puxi secured its current location, consolidating all divisions on the site. With stable facilities, school leadership over the following two decades focused on academic and programmatic development. SAS introduced the International Baccalaureate (IB) program in 2000, becoming one of the few schools to offer both IB and Advanced Placement (AP) courses.

Subsequent years saw the creation of signature programs such as Microcampus and the Innovation Institute. New athletic and performing arts facilities, including gyms, aquatics centers, black box theaters, and performing arts centers on both campuses were constructed, providing resources comparable to those of small colleges. A sustained emphasis on recruiting highly qualified educators contributed to the school's ability to attract faculty from around the world.

== Academics ==
The school has various signature programs, including Innovation Institute, a two-year interdisciplinary project-based learning program, and Microcampus, a month-long immersion into a small village in China's Yunnan Province. Microcampus and Innovation Institute have both been recognized by hundred as part of the 100 most innovative education programs in the world.

Both campuses, in Puxi and Pudong, offer Advanced Placement and International Baccalaureate Diplomas, as well as both programs together to high school students.

== Accreditations and memberships ==
Shanghai American School is accredited by the Western Association of Schools and Colleges and the Council of International Schools. SAS is a member of several international education organizations, including the Association of China and Mongolia International Schools, the East Asia Regional Council of Schools, the Council for Advancement and Support of Education, and the Principals' Training Center.

== Activities ==
Students at the school engage in over 150 clubs, sports, and other activities, including the National English Honor Society, National Honor Society, Rho Kappa Honor Society, Science National Honor Society, Mu Alpha Theta, Model United Nations, National Arts Honor Society, National Honor Society of Dance Arts, International Thespian Society, VEX Robotics Competition, and Tri-M Music Honor Society.

SAS is a founding member of Asia Pacific Activities Conference (APAC), which comprises some of the largest international schools in Asia. Through APAC, SAS students participate in a variety of intramural recreations, including badminton, volleyball, band, choir, and theater. The school also co-founded the China Cup and Tri-Cities competitions. SAS students also compete in the China International Schools Sports Association (CISSA) League and the Association of China and Mongolia International Schools (ACAMIS).

=== Bootleg SAS ===
During the suspension, SAS teacher Frank "Unk" Cheney determined school must continue. He gathered the remaining faculty, staff, and equipment and continued SAS under a series of different names calling them "Bootleg SAS".

Bootleg SAS operated out of the SAS campus on Hengshan Road, as well as in the International Community Church across the street. In 1943, Cheney and most of the SAS population were forced into Chapei Civilian Assembly Camp, a Japanese-run internment camp. Still not content to see the school cease operations, Cheney packed thousands of books and brought them to an internment camp so the school could go on. Housed in an open-air shed with rudimentary supplies, the newest iteration of Bootleg SAS nevertheless opened with 222 students. At the end of World War II, the SAS Board of Managers vowed to re-open SAS in the fall of 1946. Unwilling to wait an additional year, Cheney opened yet another Bootleg SAS in the fall of 1945 to serve students until SAS could officially open the following fall.

=== Post-WWII ===
At SAS, the period of 1946–49 saw the return of old traditions, sports and arts programs. The school and its campus were even featured in LIFE magazine. But by 1949, with China at the end of the civil war and Shanghai about to be liberated by the Communist Party, the SAS Board of Managers once again made the decision to close the school.

The Rev. Val Sundt, then vice principal, was inspired to invoke the "Spirit of Cheney" and assure the school would once again continue. Sundt founded the final Bootleg SAS in 1949–50, called Private American School. At the conclusion of the school year in May 1950, Sundt closed the school and the remaining SAS teachers and students heeded evacuation warnings from the U.S. State Department and departed Shanghai.

=== Re-founding ===
In January 1980, encouraged by the reformist efforts of Chinese leader Deng Xiaoping, the U.S. re-established its Consulate in Shanghai. One of the Consulate's first employees, economics advisor Tom Lauer, brought his wife, Linnea, and three children to Shanghai. Recognizing a need to educate the children of Consulate employees, the U.S. State Department asked Lauer to restart Shanghai American School.

SAS re-opened on the U.S. Consulate grounds on Huai Hai Road in September 1980. It remained there until outgrowing the space in 1989.

The Shanghai Girls #3 School agreed to share space with SAS. With a booming foreign population coming into Shanghai, SAS had heavy demand.

=== Pitstop campus era ===
By the mid-1990s, SAS had decided to build not one but two purpose-built campuses – one on each side of Shanghai's Huangpu River. Before the campus construction could be completed, the school moved again.

Three temporary campuses were established. In Puxi, a semi-built cultural center in Zhudi Town was reassigned to the school. In Pudong, another cultural center – Huaxia – was selected to be SAS' first presence on the Pudong side of the Huangpu River. A third temporary campus was founded in the Shanghai Centre on Nanjing Road to serve the youngest SAS attendees, though it soon proved unnecessary and closed after just one semester.

Facilities during this time in SAS history were makeshift at best. The school's swim team held competitions at Shanghai's Holiday Inn, and storefronts across from campus served as classrooms while the school continued making plans for the future. SAS became a co-founder of the region's Asia Pacific Athletic Conference (APAC), in spite of having no athletics facilities at the time.

=== Modern-day SAS ===
In 1998, the Pudong campus opened in the Shanghai Links. In 2000, the Puxi campus opened in Minhang, just off the Shanghai-Changzhou Expressway.

In 2004, seven North Koreans climbed over the perimeter wall of the Puxi campus and, thinking that the school was US government property, attempted to claim asylum. The seven North Koreans were later removed by police.

In 2024, Shanghai American School was ranked first out of all international schools in Shanghai in the Forbes China International School Ranking.

== Notable alumni ==
- Cameron Dicker – American professional football player for the Los Angeles Chargers

== See also ==
- List of international schools in Shanghai
- Americans in China
