= WYKO =

Sabana Grande, Puerto Rico; Puerto Rico
- Frequency: 880 kHz
- Branding: La Poderosa 880

Programming
- Format: Spanish variety

Ownership
- Owner: Juan Galiano Rivera; (Southwestern Broadcasting Corporation)
- Sister stations: WBSG

History
- First air date: 1982
- Last air date: 2025
- Former call signs: WPRX (1982–1985); WBOZ (1985–1990)

Technical information
- Licensing authority: FCC
- Facility ID: 32413
- Class: B
- Power: 1,000 watts day; 500 watts night
- Transmitter coordinates: 18°4′21″N 66°57′6″W

Links
- Public license information: Public file; LMS
- Website: www.wyko880am.com

WYKO (880 AM) was a radio station broadcasting a Spanish variety format. It was licensed to Sabana Grande, Puerto Rico, and served the Puerto Rico area. The station was owned by Juan Galiano Rivera.

The Federal Communications Commission cancelled the station’s license on January 31, 2025.
