= Garry Ahern =

New Zealand sports journalist (1949–2025)

Garry Noel Ahern (7 September 1949 – 24 June 2025) was a New Zealand sports broadcaster.

== Life and career ==
Ahern was born on 7 September 1949, and grew up in Whanganui. After dropping out of university, he began his career in 1969 at the New Zealand Broadcasting Corporation, working as an accounts clerk. He moved to Wellington, joining the sports department, four years later, and remained a sports journalist for the rest of his career. He began working on Radio New Zealand's morning news programme Morning Report in 1997, and 2013 he was awarded a lifetime achievement award for contributions to sports journalism. He retired at the end of 2015.

Ahern died on 24 June 2025, at the age of 75.
