= Night Owl Cinematics =

Singaporean YouTube channel and media company

YouTube information
- Channel: Night Owl Cinematics
- Years active: 2011–2022
- Genres: Sketch comedy; Vlogging; Film
- Subscribers: 886 thousand
- Views: 336 million
- Last updated: 18 Nov 2026

Night Owl Cinematics (NOC) was a Singaporean YouTube channel and production company. Founded by Ryan Tan and Sylvia Chan, the company was known for their comedy videos, travelogues, lifestyle videos, as well as their now defunct food review series, Food King. The owners of NOC also own the channels NOC Plays and TEAM NOC. As of 2026, all videos on the main channel have been set to private.

== History ==
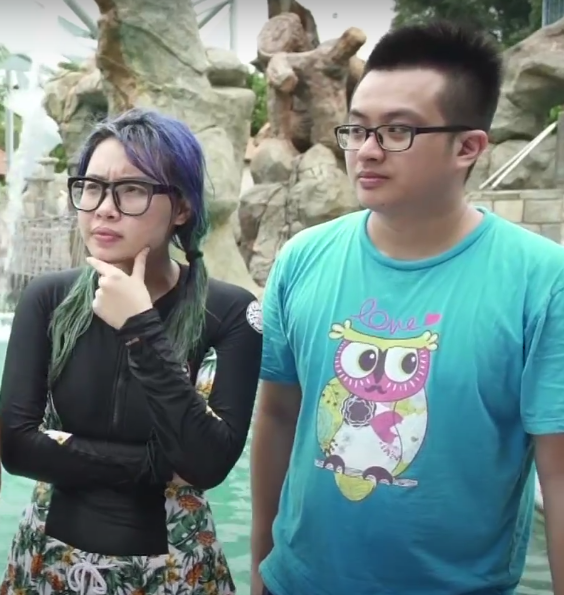
Night Owl Cinematics founders Ryan Tan and Sylvia Chan in 2016

Ryan Tan met Sylvia Chan when both were doing part-time modelling at age 16. The duo started to date 5 years later and eventually got married at 22.

The couple started Night Owl Cinematics (NOC) production company in February 2013, after a failed Chinese restaurant venture. They initially started in wedding videography and started honing their videography and editing skills on YouTube. After their YouTube video Shit Singaporean Girlfriends Say became popular, they transitioned into full-time YouTube personalities.

Tan served as the cinematographer, art director and occasionally cameoed in their early productions wearing a watermelon helmet as he had issues appearing in front of the camera properly. Sylvia Chan managed the business aspects of the company. Hokkien and Singlish colloquialisms are frequently used in their videos, offering glimpses into Singaporean culture. Nina Tan, a cousin of Ryan Tan, would be involved with the company in various capacities, acting and hosting in its productions, and managing the company's website.

On 31 May 2020, the couple announced that their divorce was finalised in March 2020 after being separated for three years.

=== Allegations against operations in NOC ===
On 7 October 2021, Chan was accused by an anonymous Instagram account @sgcickenrice of verbally abusing employees and fostering a toxic workplace culture with one talent named Samantha being singled out with an "exit strategy" requested by Chan. In response to the allegations, various brands such as Colgate and Milo ceased their collaborations with the company. NOC responded on 11 October, labelling the allegations a 'massive' smear campaign. It also touted its efforts in developing its employees in a safe space, before adding that there were "serious breaches" of privacy laws being investigated by the authorities. The Instagram account was subsequently issued a cease and desist letter from Edmond Pereira Law Corporation, before the account responded a day later with a letter from Eugene Thuraisingam saying that the allegations were not proven to be untrue and asked if the letter was worded to threaten criminal proceedings.

On 13 October, Chan apologised in a statement and acknowledged that she "did not live up to the standards expected of (her)". She was also removed from NOC’s line-up of artistes. However, Samantha Tan, whose alleged mistreatment by Chan was what ignited this saga, pointed out inaccuracies in Chan's statement.

On 15 October, it was reported by Mothership that an office similar to NOC's headquarters was listed on CommercialGuru for sale. The sale was later removed the same day.

On 19 October, current and former NOC employees revealed further information in two reports, with screenshots and video recordings that accused Chan of delayed salaries, workplace abuse and pressures, insensitivity in dealing with mental health issues, favouritism, no official human resources department, forcing people to take sides, infidelity, embezzling company money, sexually exploiting her female talents, fat-shaming a talent, as well as criminal conduct pertaining to her fiduciary duties. As at 20 October, NOC's subscriber base fell from 1 million to 995 thousand. Various public authorities like the Singapore Police Force, Immigration and Checkpoints Authority, Ministry of Manpower, and Tripartite Alliance for Fair and Progressive Employment Practices were made aware and are looking into the various allegations. In addition, Chan filed a report against harassment and a private video leak, adding that she would address the allegations "soon" and that she kept her silence out of "civility". After 12 months of investigations by the police, Chan was clear of all her allegations.

It was also made known that Ryan Tan had tried to resign as NOC's director in May 2021 and was not involved with the company's management since then. However, due to the allegations, Tan resumed his director role. The anonymous Instagram account @sgcickenrice was later revealed to be created by Brandon Mah, an influencer and a friend to one of the NOC talents, who felt that he had to speak out for NOC employees.

=== Post-controversy ===
A few months after the controversy, Tan announced that he was no longer involved with NOC's operations, resigning since 19 January 2022. Another influencer, Aiken Chia, resigned as well. On 26 January 2022, NOC announced it would pivot from an influencer-driven model to a content-driven model, and aimed to expand regionally. In July 2022, separate legal proceedings initiated by NOC against Ryan Tan (and Reno King Pte Ltd), and two other of its former talents, Samantha Tan and Grace Lim, were held.

== Brands ==
=== Team NOC ===
A subsidiary company which managed NOC's talents. It would also run its own YouTube channel. In July 2022, legal proceedings initiated by Team NOC against its former talents, Samanthan Tan and Grace Lim, were held.

=== Former brands ===
Food King

In 2017, Aiken Chia, a The 5 Search runner-up and 987FM's YouTube channel host, joined Night Owl Cinematics and started Food King as a brand under NOC. Together with other NOC's former personalities, Dee Kosh and Ryan Tan, they would produce videos hosted recommending different food & beverages establishments and their food. The weekly series developed a trademark humour and was popular. In August 2020, Dee Kosh parted from NOC after sexual misconduct allegations surfaced, thus exited from the Food King series. After Sylvia Chan was alleged to have verbally abused employees and fostering a toxic workplace culture on 7 October 2021, Food King series was not updated since 8 October 2021. The 8 October video was dislike bombed by 10 October, with netizens being enraged at the allegations. Chia and Tan would eventually leave the company by end of 2021. On 22 June 2022, NOC posted a new Food King video. The video departed from offering food recommendations to the viewers, and instead presented the F&B establishment in a story format. On 3 September 2022, Food King announced on its social media channels its permanent closure.

==== Reno King ====
Reno King is a YouTube series that focuses on house renovations. It is a project by Ryan Tan. Its first video was released on 15 November 2020 as a yet to be named series, and would finally be named as Reno King in its third video released on 8 March 2021. In April 2021, while still with NOC, Ryan Tan would incorporate Reno King Pte Ltd. After the workplace allegations surfaced, Sylvia Chan claimed that the incorporation was done without her knowledge, which Tan rebutted otherwise, and that Chan had urged him to incorporate the company quickly. Tan stated that they had agreed that 20% of Reno King profits would be paid to NOC for using NOC as a platform and as an admin fee. Tan did not publish any videos for Reno King until 9 October 2021, and had done so on its own separate YouTube channel instead of publishing on NOC's YouTube channel. In July 2022, legal proceedings initiated by NOC against Reno King Pte Ltd was held at the Supreme Court.

=== Sugar Melon ===
Sugar Melon (衰哥霉人) was launched on 7 December 2019. It is a Chinese-language channel. The hosts on the channel were Rao Zijie, Nina Tan and Yan Wei 小二. The channel has ceased to exist, following the NOC saga resulting in all of the hosts leaving the channel.

The following are the series on the channel:

Prank it!

Hosts Rao Zijie and Nina Tan would prank a celebrity in every episode. Produced in partnership with MediaCorp.

谁是卧底 Spyfall

An adapted version of famous party game Mafia. It stars many of NOC's talents.

==== The Thirsty Sisters ====
The Thirsty Sisters was a podcast series co-hosted by Sylvia Chan and Nina Tan. It was launched in 2020. However, following the workplace allegations, all Thirsty Sisters content were taken down from NOC's YouTube channel and its TikTok and Instagram accounts were deleted by 21 October 2021.

== Accolades ==
- 2015 – "Collab of the Year" and "Comedy Video of the Year" awards, Singapore Social Media Awards
- 2016 – Ryan Tan and Sylvia Chan were listed by Forbes in the 30 under 30 in Asia list under Media, Marketing & Advertising.
