= Alessandro Milan =

- Born: 5 December 1970 (age 54); Sesto San Giovanni, Italy
- Occupation(s): Journalist, Radio host, TV Presenter
- Spouse: Francesca Del Rosso
- Children: 2

Alessandro Milan (born 5 December 1970) is an Italian radio and television presenter and journalist.

== Television ==
- Funanboli – (7 Gold, 2013-2014)
