= Raïssa Gbédji =

Beninese journalist and singer (1972/1973–2025)

- Born: 1972 or 1973
- Died: 21 June 2025 (aged 52); Lyon, France
- Occupations: Journalist, singer

Raïssa Gbédji (1972 or 1973 – 21 June 2025) was a Beninese journalist and singer.

== Life and career ==
Born in 1972 or 1973, Gbédji studied secretarial studies and communications. She first worked as a news presenter for Golfe FM before serving as editor-in-chief at Océan FM. She was then spotted by Radio France Internationale and became its chief Benin correspondent. In 2010, she was questioned by the Haute Autorité de l’audiovisuel et de la communication after she reported that the National Assembly was threatening to impeach President Thomas Boni Yayi in connection with an illegal financial affair.

Outside of her journalistic pursuits, Gbédji was a women's rights activist and singer, fusing jazz with traditional Beninese music. In 2018, she released an EP titled N’djah and gave a concert at the Bénin Royal Hôtel in Cotonou on 11 May of that year. The EP primarily focused on the sharing and promotion of traditional Beninese values.

== Death ==
Raïssa Gbédji died in Lyon on 21 June 2025, at the age of 52.
