= SAFRA National Service Association =

Social club in Singapore

SAFRA National Service Association is an organisation that was formed as a social and recreational club for National Servicemen from the Singapore Armed Forces. It was originally formed in 1972 as the "Singapore Armed Forces Reservist Association".

== History ==
SAFRA was started on 2 July 1972 and was launched by, then Defence Minister of Singapore, Dr Goh Keng Swee.

From 1996 to 2012 (Sunday 17 June, Fathers Day) SAFRA and Republic of Singapore Air Force (RSAF) co-organized the National Runway Cycling & Skating at Paya Lebar Air Base with 6,000–8,000 participants. ("Skating" was included in the events name from 2008 on, when skaters grew more.)

== Mission ==
The SAFRA Mission

"To be a dynamic institution effective in bonding NSmen through a network of quality lifestyle clubs, services and activities. We shall be reputed for our good value and innovation."

This was to reward servicemen for their service to the nation with some relaxation from their hectic lives.

== Locations ==
There are currently 8 SAFRA clubhouses located across the island:

SAFRA Mt Faber	SAFRA Jurong	SAFRA Punggol	SAFRA Carpenter Street
SAFRA Tampines	SAFRA Toa Payoh	SAFRA Yishun	SAFRA Choa Chu Kang

== Gallery ==
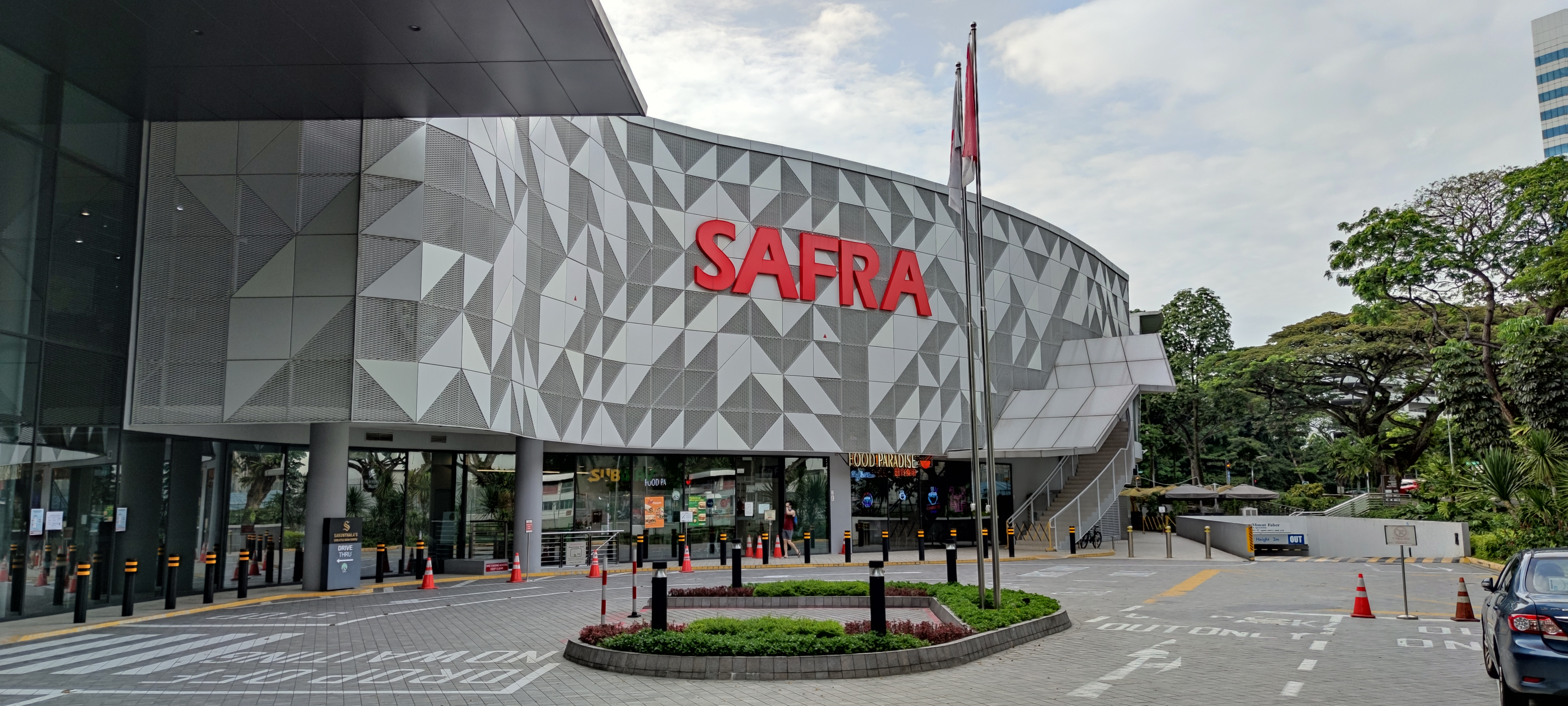
Exterior (facade) of SAFRA Mt Faber Clubhouse

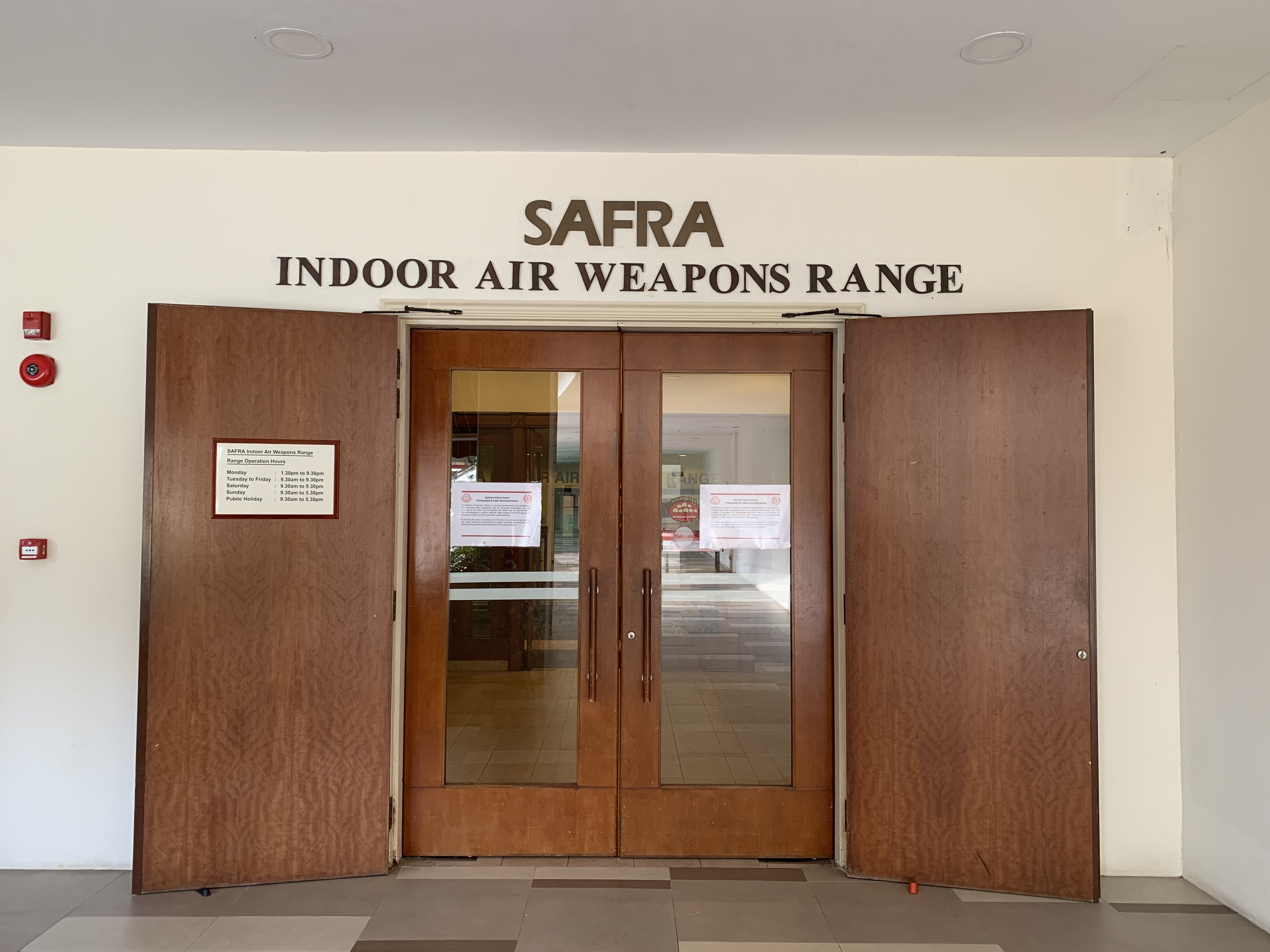
Indoor Air Weapons Range at SAFRA Yishun

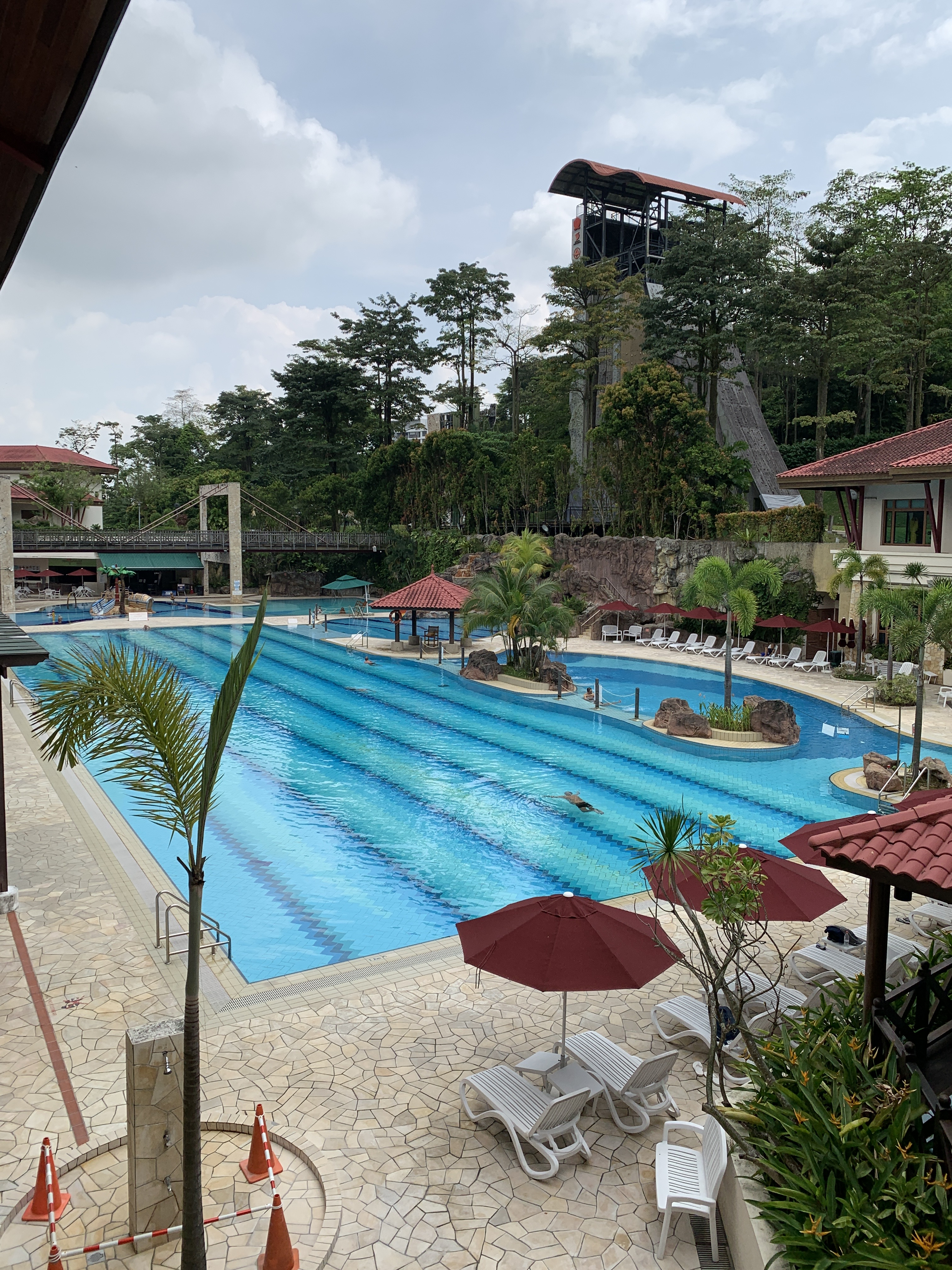
Swimming pool at SAFRA Yishun

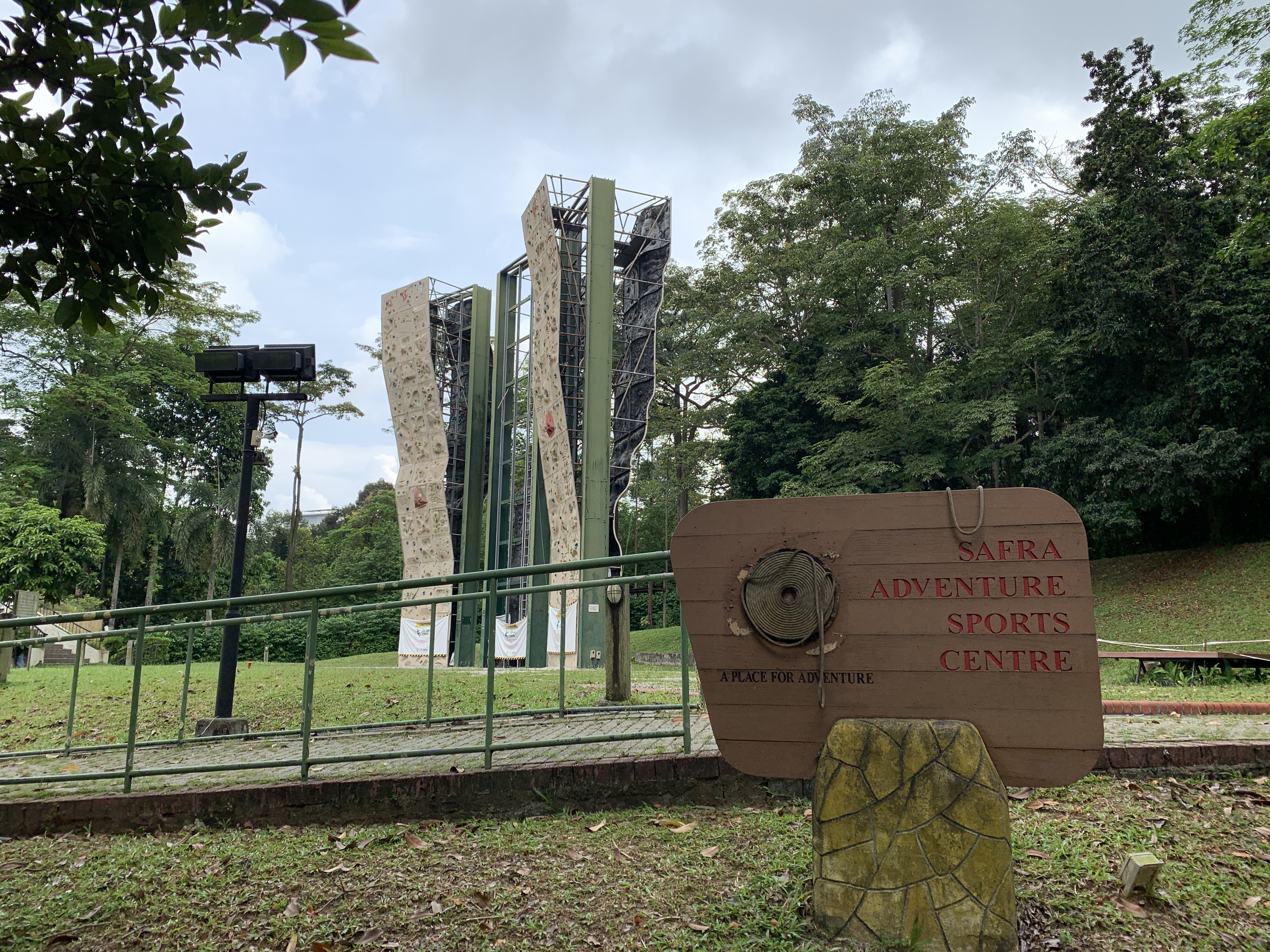
Adventure Sports Centre at SAFRA Yishun

== See also ==
- Recreation
- Work-life balance
- Entertainment
- R&R (military)
