= Broadcast law =

Statutory law

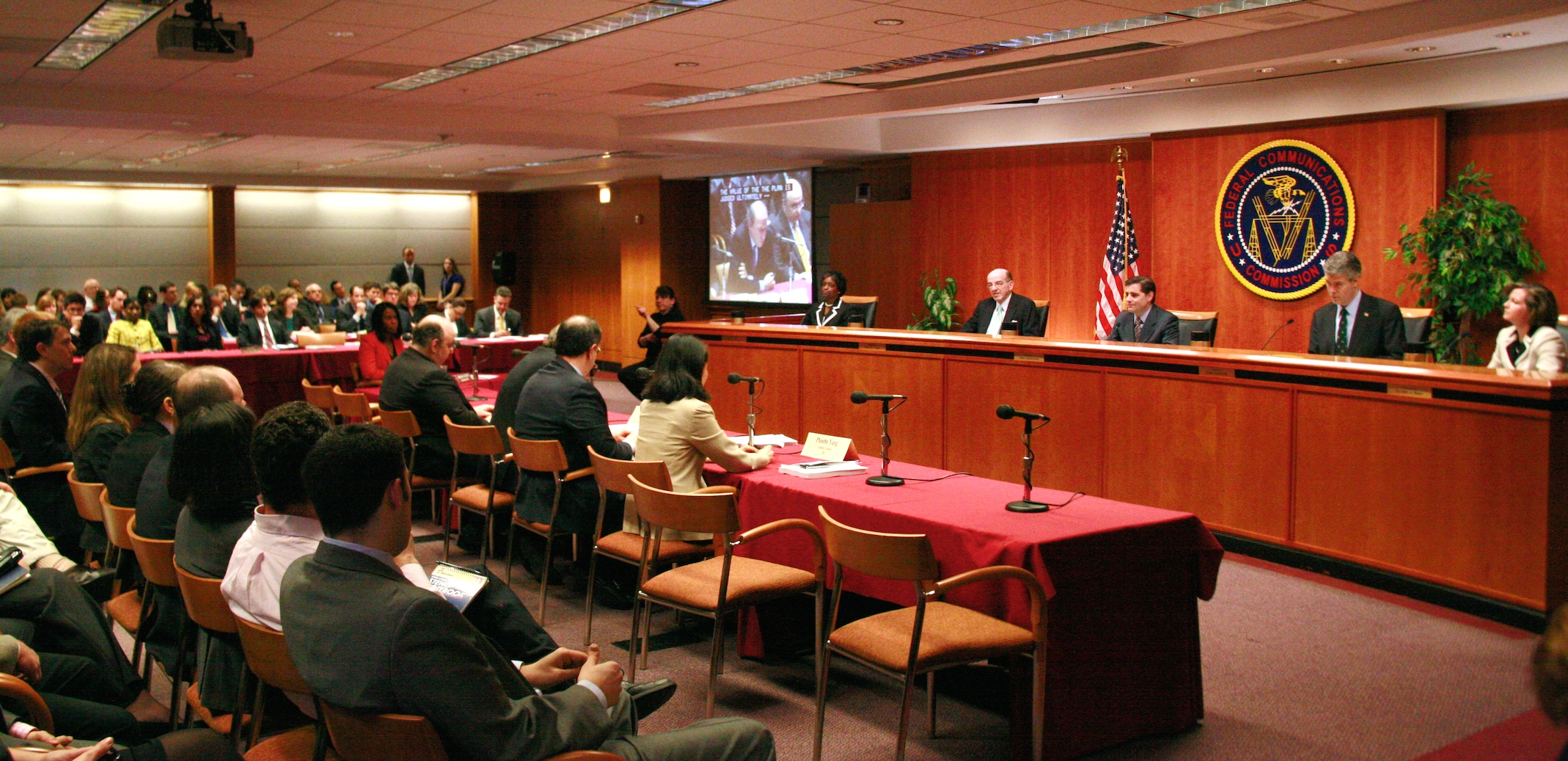
FCC public open meeting.

Broadcast law is the field of law that pertains to broadcasting. These laws and regulations pertain to radio stations and TV stations, and are also considered to include closely related services like cable TV and cable radio, as well as satellite TV and satellite radio. Likewise, it also extends to broadcast networks.

Broadcast law includes technical parameters for these facilities, as well as content issues like copyright, profanity, and localism or regionalism.

== Philippines ==
In the Philippines, broadcasting falls under the jurisdiction of the National Telecommunications Commission while non-political content regulation is under the jurisdiction of the Movie and Television Review and Classification Board. Political ones are regulated by the Commission on Elections.

Under the Philippine law, broadcasting networks require a congressional franchise to operate television and radio stations.

== United States ==
In the US, broadcasting falls under the jurisdiction of the Federal Communications Commission.

Some of the more notable aspects of broadcast law involve:

- frequency allocation: The division of the spectrum into unlicensed frequency bands -- ISM band and U-NII—and licensed frequency bands -- television channel frequencies, FM broadcast band, amateur radio frequency allocations, etc.
- low-power broadcasting
- fairness doctrine
- public broadcasting

=== History ===
The Radio Act of 1927 was the first major broadcasting law in the country. One of its provisions was the equal opportunity provision, providing a foundation for the equal time rule. This provision requires radio, television stations and cable systems which originate their own programming to treat legally qualified political candidates equally in selling or giving away air time. Concerns that, without mandated equal opportunity for candidates, some broadcasters might try to manipulate elections led to its creation by legislators. The Communications Act of 1934 amended the Radio Act of 1927 and the equal time provision is located in section 315 of the Communications Act of 1934.

The Communications Act of 1934 was another hallmark moment in broadcasting law history, because it created the Federal Communications Commission (FCC) for the purpose of "regulating interstate and foreign commerce in communication by wire and radio so as to make available, so far as possible, to all the people of the United States, without discrimination on the basis of race, color, religion, national origin, or sex, a rapid, efficient, nationwide, and world wide wire and radio communications service ..." (In this context, the word "radio" covers both broadcast radio and television.) The FCC has the authority to "make such regulations not inconsistent with law as it may deem necessary to prevent interference between stations and to carry out the provisions of the Communications Act of 1934."

In 1949, the FCC enacted a policy, referred to as the "Fairness Doctrine," for the purpose of ensuring balanced and fair coverage of all controversial issues by a broadcast station. The FCC adopted the view that station licensees were "public trustees," and, therefore, had an obligation to broadcast discussion of contrasting viewpoints on controversial issues of public importance. It was later established that stations should also actively seek out issues of importance to their community and air programming about those issues. During the 1980s, the Reagan Administration pressured the FCC to eliminate the fairness doctrine.

== United Kingdom ==
In the UK, broadcasting has been regulated by the Office of Communications (Ofcom) since 2002.

Scheduled radio and television broadcasting services need a licence from Ofcom under the Broadcasting Act 1990 or 1996, and must comply with the Ofcom Broadcasting Code made under section 319 of the Communications Act 2003, together with a number of other codes relating to access, electronic programme guides, advertising, and so on. The BBC is subject to some, but not all, of the requirements of the Broadcasting Code.

On-demand television services are regulated by the Ofcom, so long as they fall within the definition of regulated services in section 368A(1) of the Communications Act 2003, and must comply with the programme standards set out in Part 4A of the Communications Act 2003.

== See also ==
- Broadcast license
