= 1947 in Norway =

- Centuries: 18th; 19th; 20th; 21st
- Decades: 1920s; 1930s; 1940s; 1950s; 1960s
- See also: List of years in Norway

Events in the year 1947 in Norway.

== Incumbents ==
- Monarch – Haakon VII.
- Prime Minister – Einar Gerhardsen (Labour Party)

== Events ==
- 7 August – Thor Heyerdahl's balsa wood raft, the Kon-Tiki, smashes into the reef at Raroia in the Tuamotu Islands after a 101-day, 4,300-mile journey across the Pacific Ocean, proving that pre-historic peoples could have traveled from South America.
- 28 August – Kvitbjørn disaster: A flying boat of type Short Sandringham named "Kvitbjørn" crashes into a mountain near Lødingen in Norway; all 35 on board (28 passengers and 7 crew) perish.
- Owned by Norsk Hydro between 1912 and 1918, the artificial fertilizer production at Glomfjord is leased back to Hydro by the Norwegian government. This activity is today Yara International. Hydro also buys the power plant.
- Municipal and county elections are held throughout the country.

== Popular culture ==
=== Literature ===
- The Norwegian Writers for Children association (Norske Barne- og Ungdomsbokforfattere) is founded.
- Nils Johan Rud, novelist, short story writer and magazine editor, is awarded the Gyldendal's Endowment literature prize for the first time.

== Notable births ==
=== January ===
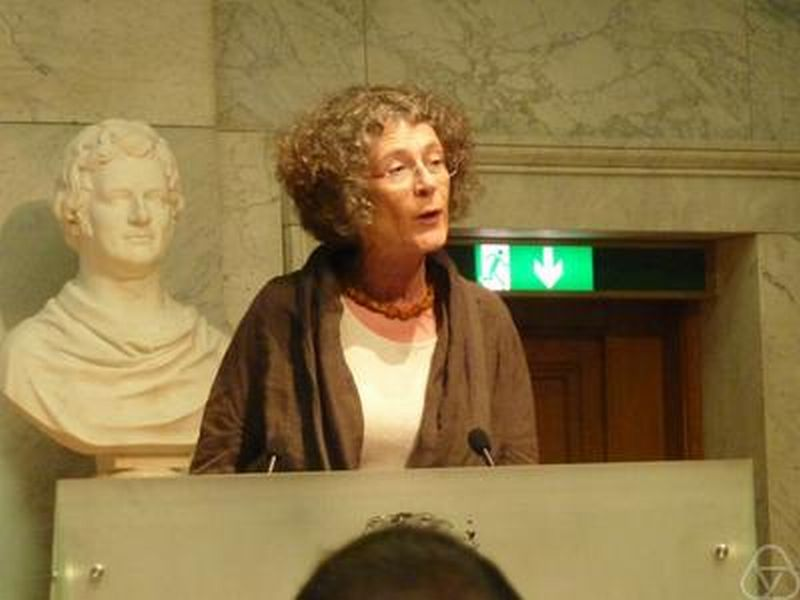
Ragni Piene

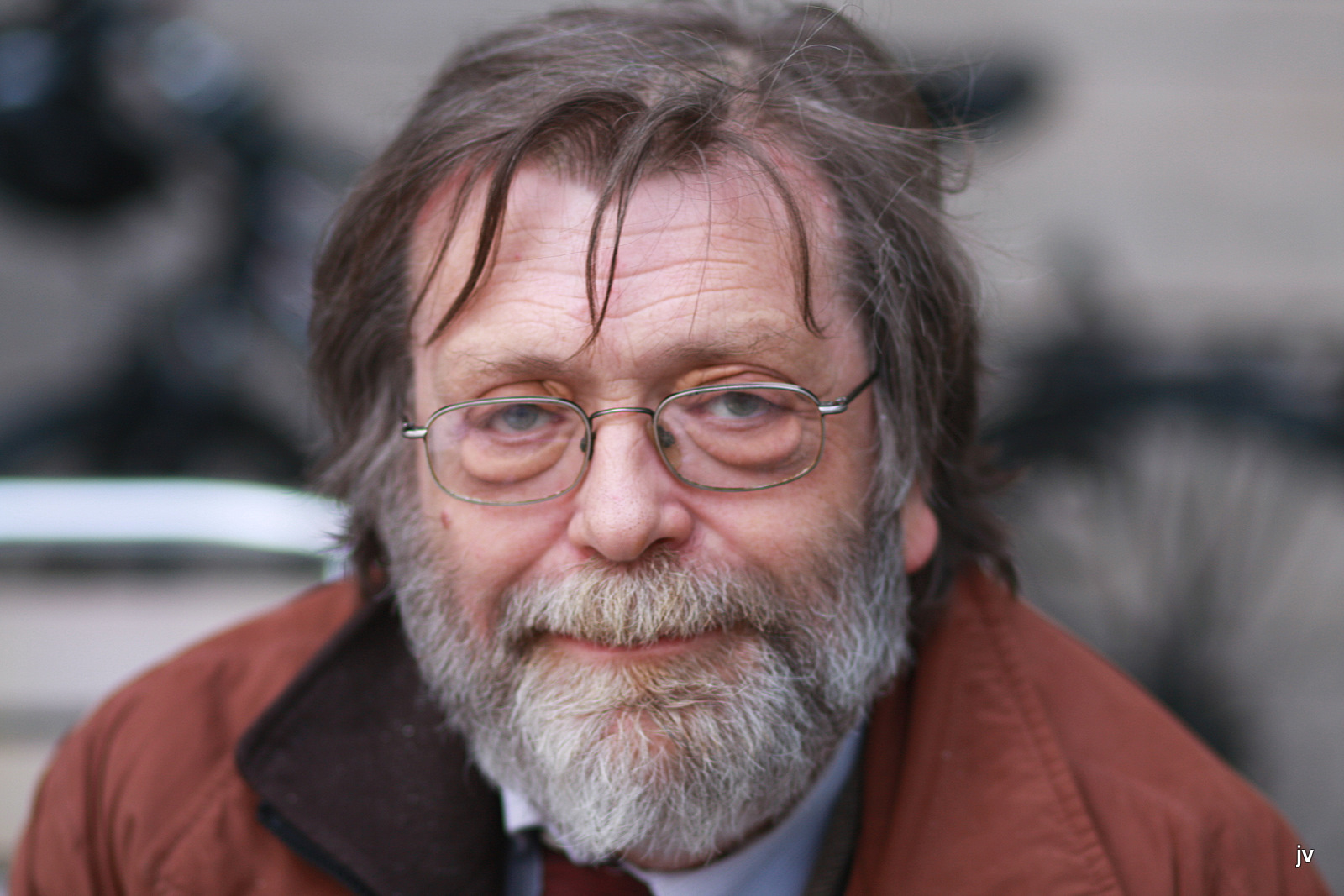
Frank Aarebrot

- 2 January – Hans Gjeisar Kjæstad, politician.
- 15 January – Erling Pedersen, writer.
- 16 January – Harald Stabell, barrister (died 2018).
- 18 January – Ragni Piene, mathematician.
- 19 January – Frank Aarebrot, political economist (died 2017.
- 20 January –
  - Liv Marie Austrem, writer.
  - Dag Jostein Fjærvoll, politician (died 2021).
- 24 January – Øystein Sunde, folk singer and guitarist.
- 29 January – Olaf Almenningen, linguist and lexicographer (died 2025).

=== February ===
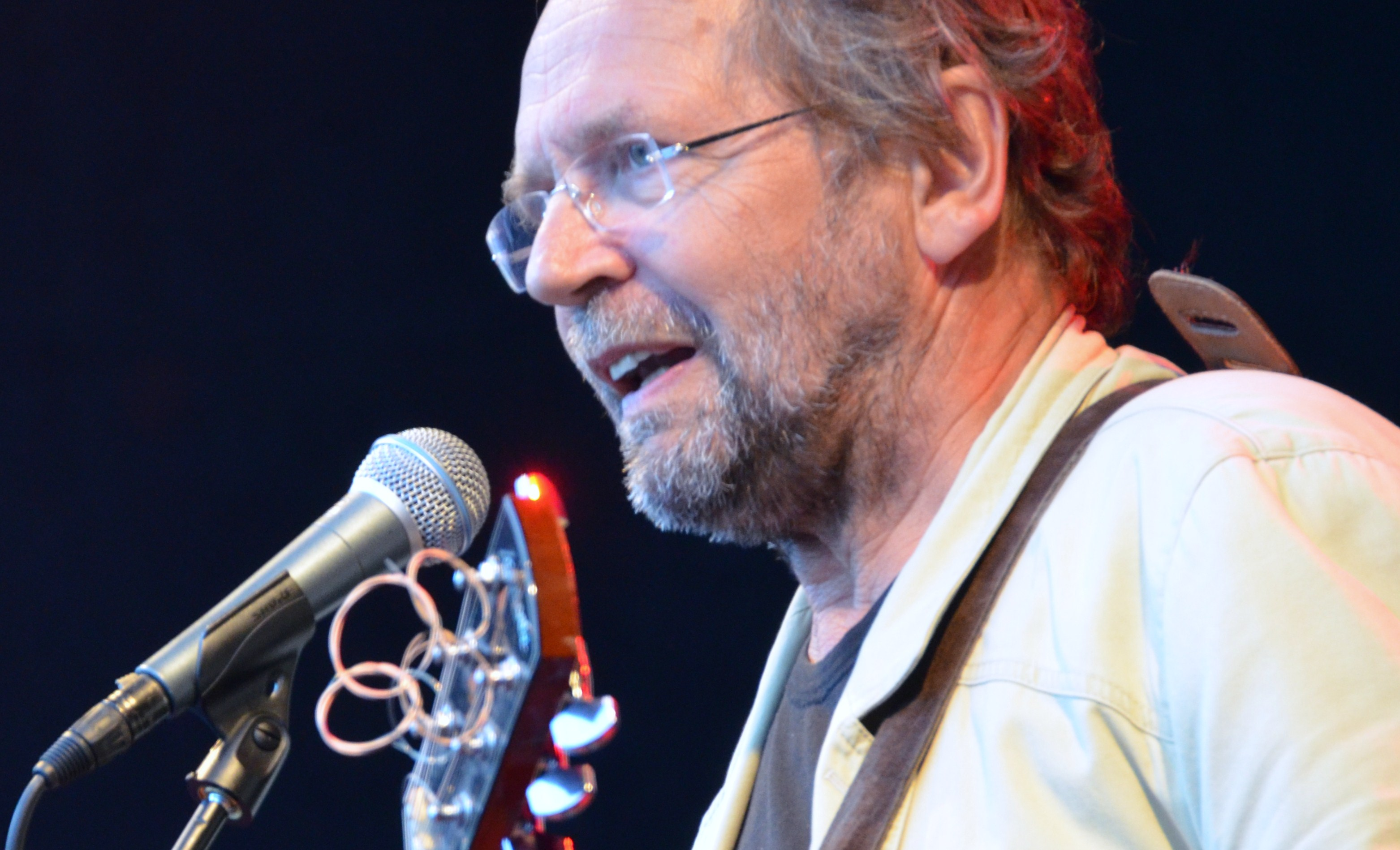
Ole Paus

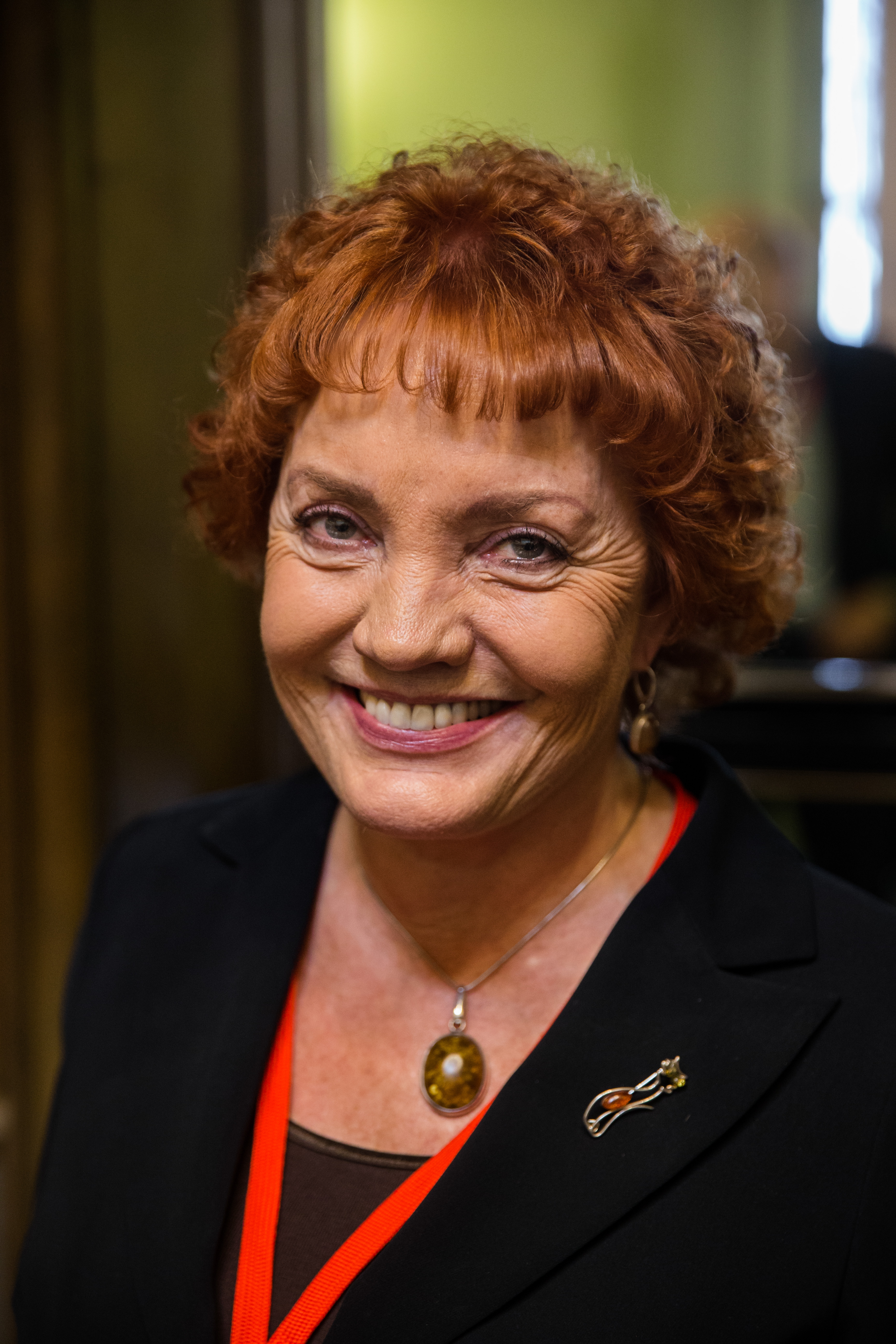
Marit Nybakk

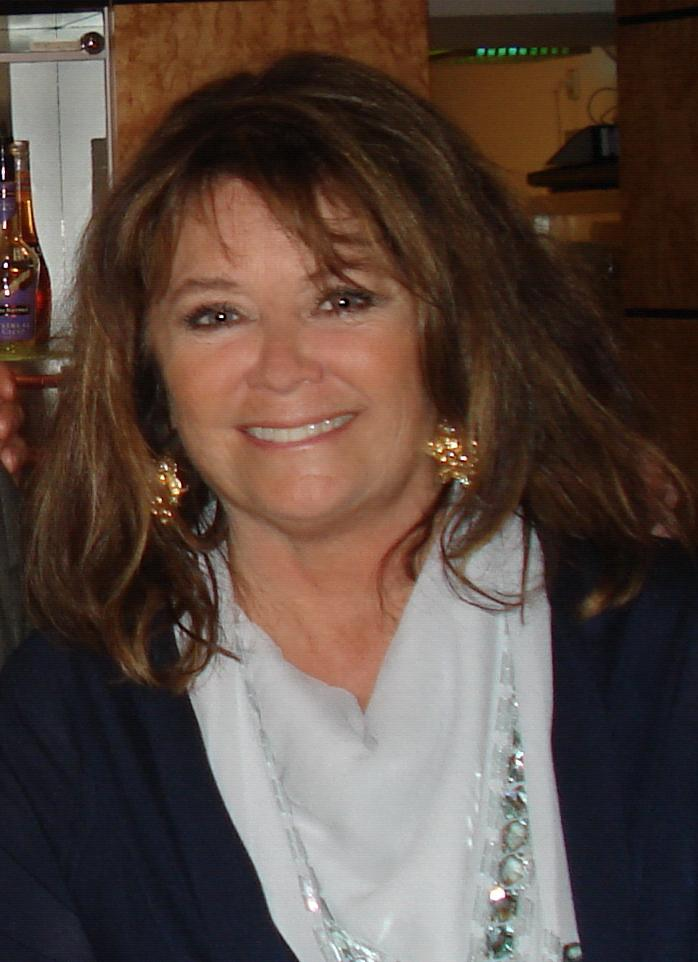
Wenche Myhre

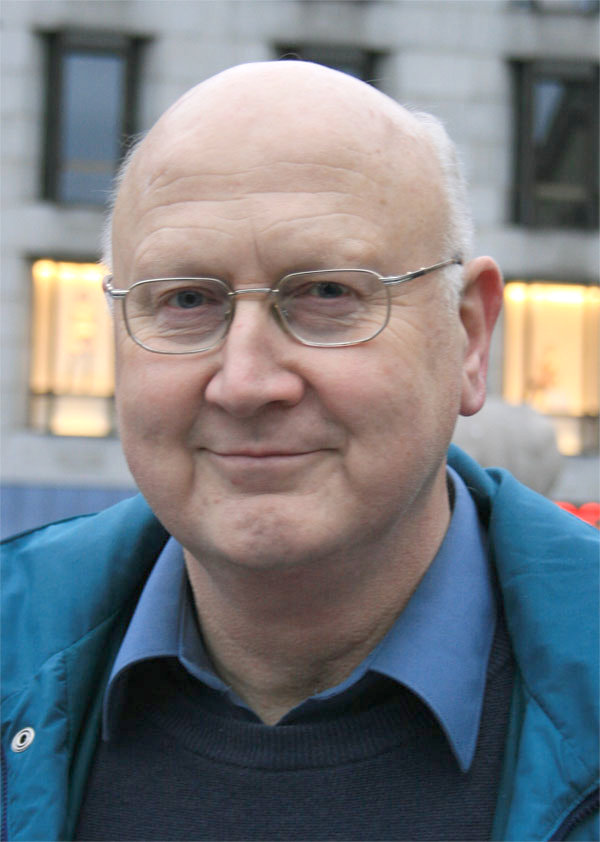
Torstein Dahle

- 4 February – Halvor Hagen, American football player
- 6 February – Arne Zwaig, chess player (died 2022).
- 9 February – Ole Paus, singer, author and poet (died 2023).
- 14 February – Marit Nybakk, politician.
- 15 February – Wenche Myhre, singer and entertainer.
- 19 February –
  - Øystein Dolmen, singer and songwriter.
  - Vidar Sandem, actor, playwright and theatre director.
- 20 February – Torstein Dahle, politician and economist.
- 27 February – Johan Elsness, politician.

=== March ===
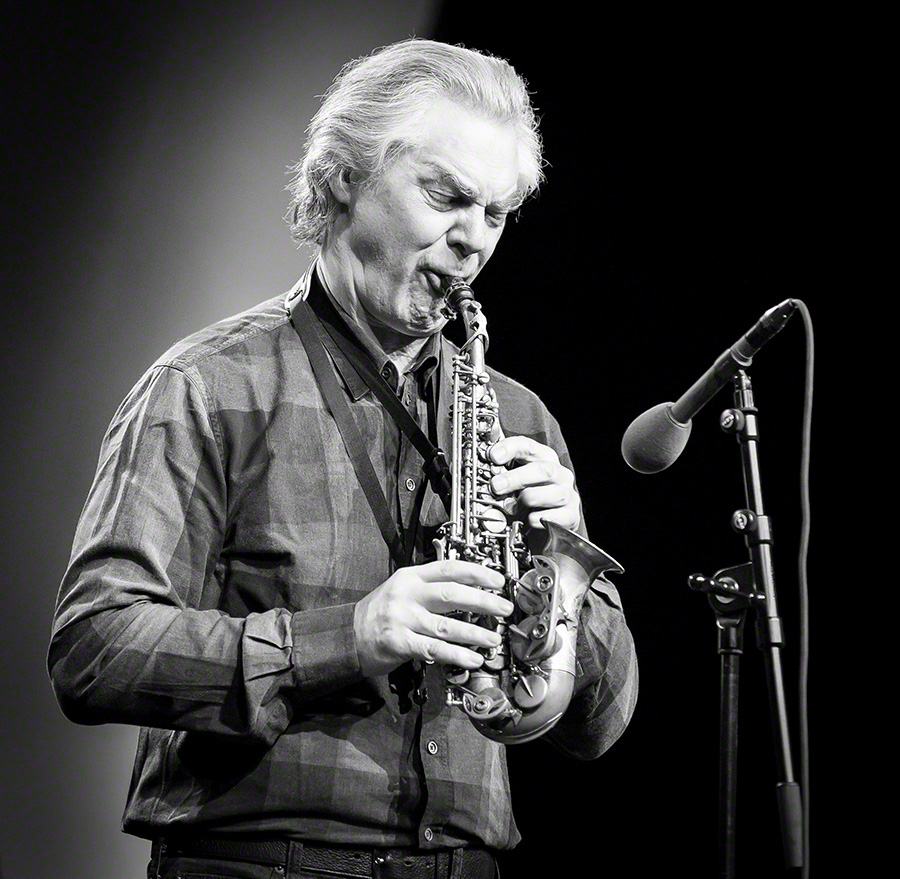
Jan Garbarek

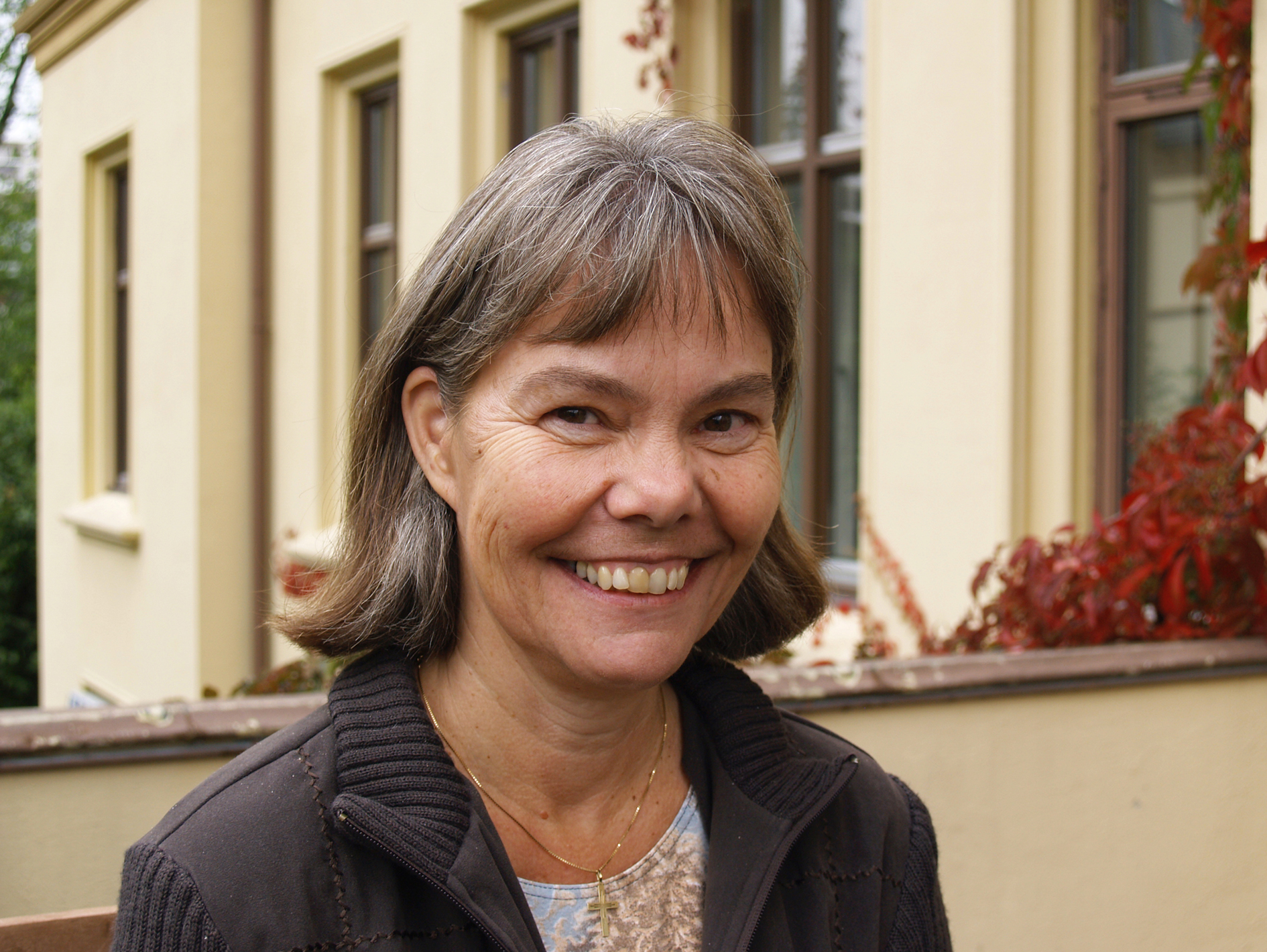
Laila Riksaasen Dahl

- 2 March – Steinar Pedersen, politician.
- 4 March – Jan Garbarek, saxophonist.
- 5 March
  - Jørg Willy Bronebakk, diplomat.
  - Lorents Lorentsen, civil servant
  - Ola Didrik Saugstad, pediatrician and professor
- 7 March – Laila Riksaasen Dahl, bishop.
- 12 March
  - Erling Lars Dale, educationalist (died 2011)
  - Arne Sortevik, politician.
- 15 March – Henning Skumsvoll, politician.
- 16 March – Erling Lae, politician
- 16 March – Karin Kinge Lindboe, writer.
- 28 March – Hanne Aga, poet (died 2019).
- 29 March – Aage Kvalbein, cellist and professor of cello.
- 30 March –
  - Torbjørn Digernes, physicist and professor
  - Terje Venaas, jazz musician (died 2025).
- 31 March – Kjell Mørk Karlsen, composer and organist.

=== April ===
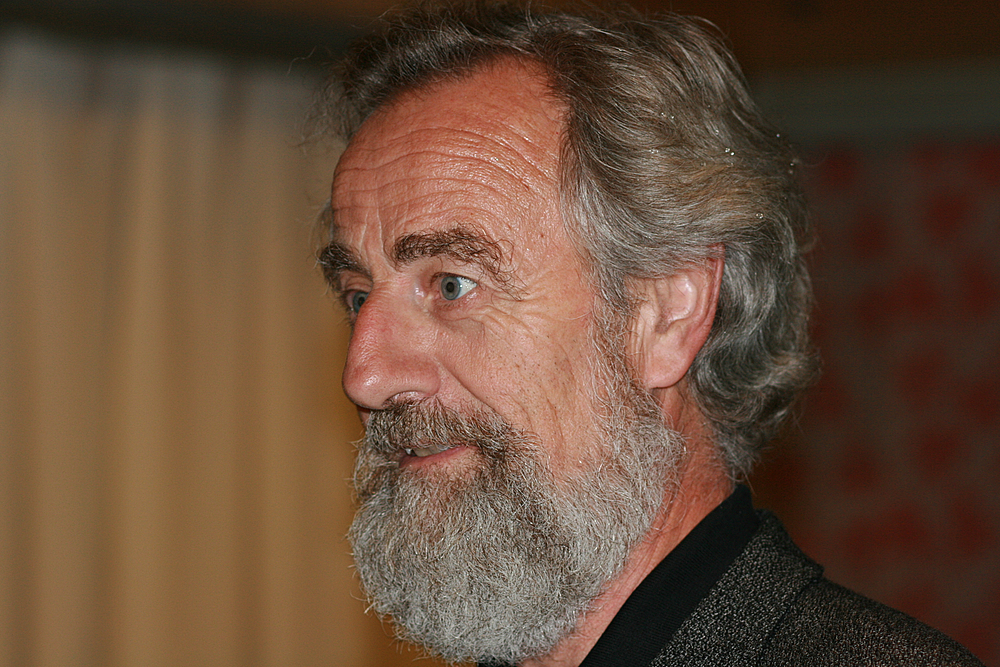
Eilef A. Meland

- 4 April – Inger Smuk, politician.
- 8 April – Odd Roar Lofterød, sailor and businessman (died 2012).
- 9 April – Olav Steinar Namtvedt, politician.
- 11 April – Kristen Fløgstad, triple jumper and long jumper.
- 12 April – Eilef A. Meland, politician.
- 22 April – Anne Brit Stråtveit, politician.
- 23 April – Hugo Parr, physicist.
- 26 April –
  - Sverre Leiro, businessperson
  - Jan Eivind Myhre, historian.
- 27 April – Svein Aage Christoffersen, theologian.
- 28 April – Ulla-Mari Brantenberg, glass artist.
- 30 April – Finn Kalvik, singer and composer

=== May ===
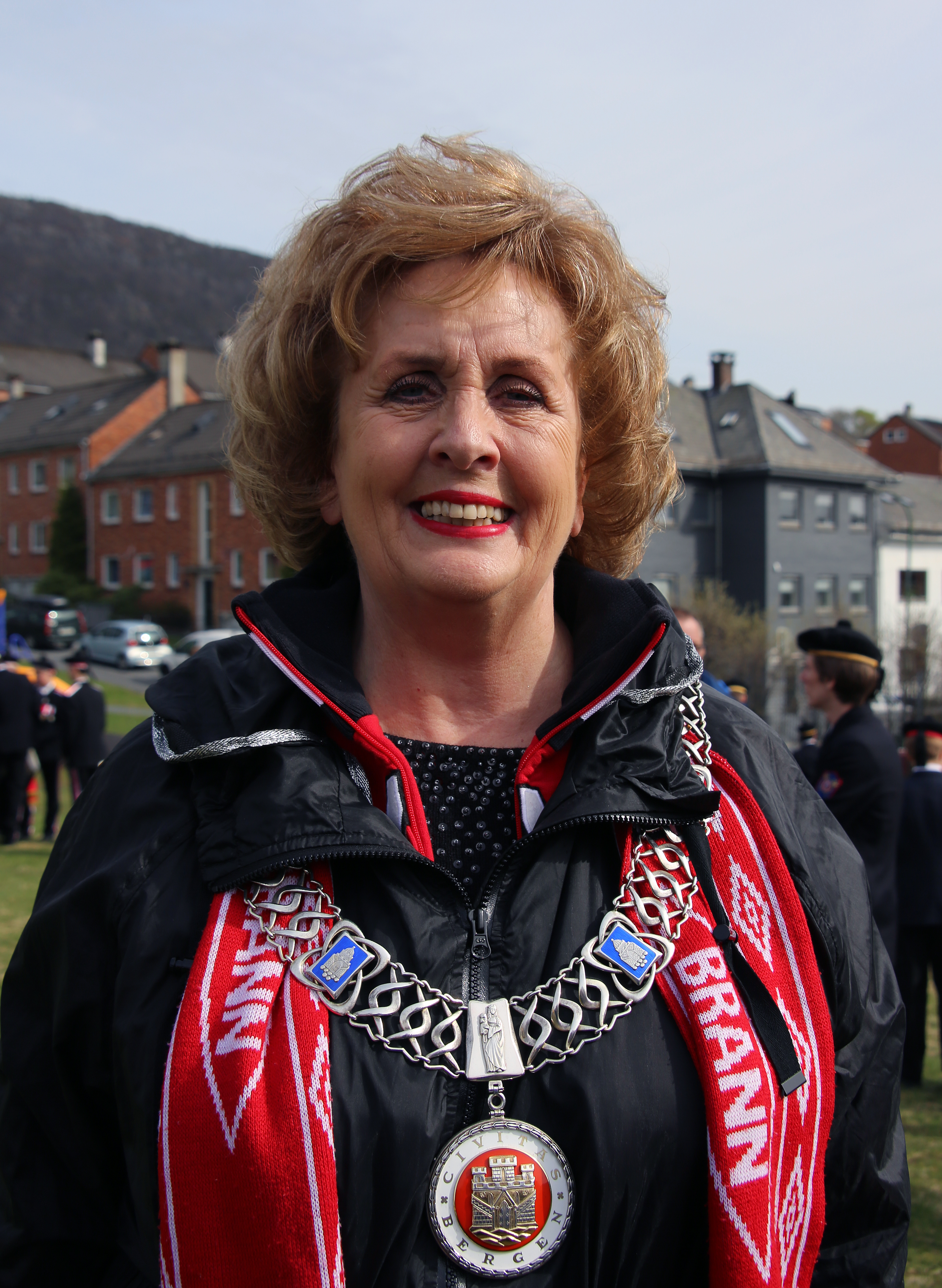
Trude Drevland

- 6 May – Odd Aalen, statistician and professor
- 8 May – Tone Birkeland, literary scholar.
- 9 May – Frank Stubb Micaelsen, poet and novelist (d. 2013).
- 12 May – Tore Eriksen, economist and civil servant
- 16 May
  - Kari Gjesteby, politician.
  - Tom Thoresen, politician.
- 17 May – Hans Brattestå, civil servant.
- 21 May – Arnved Nedkvitne, historian.
- 27 May – Trude Drevland, politician.
- 31 May – Steinar Hansson, journalist and newspaper editor (died 2004).

=== June ===
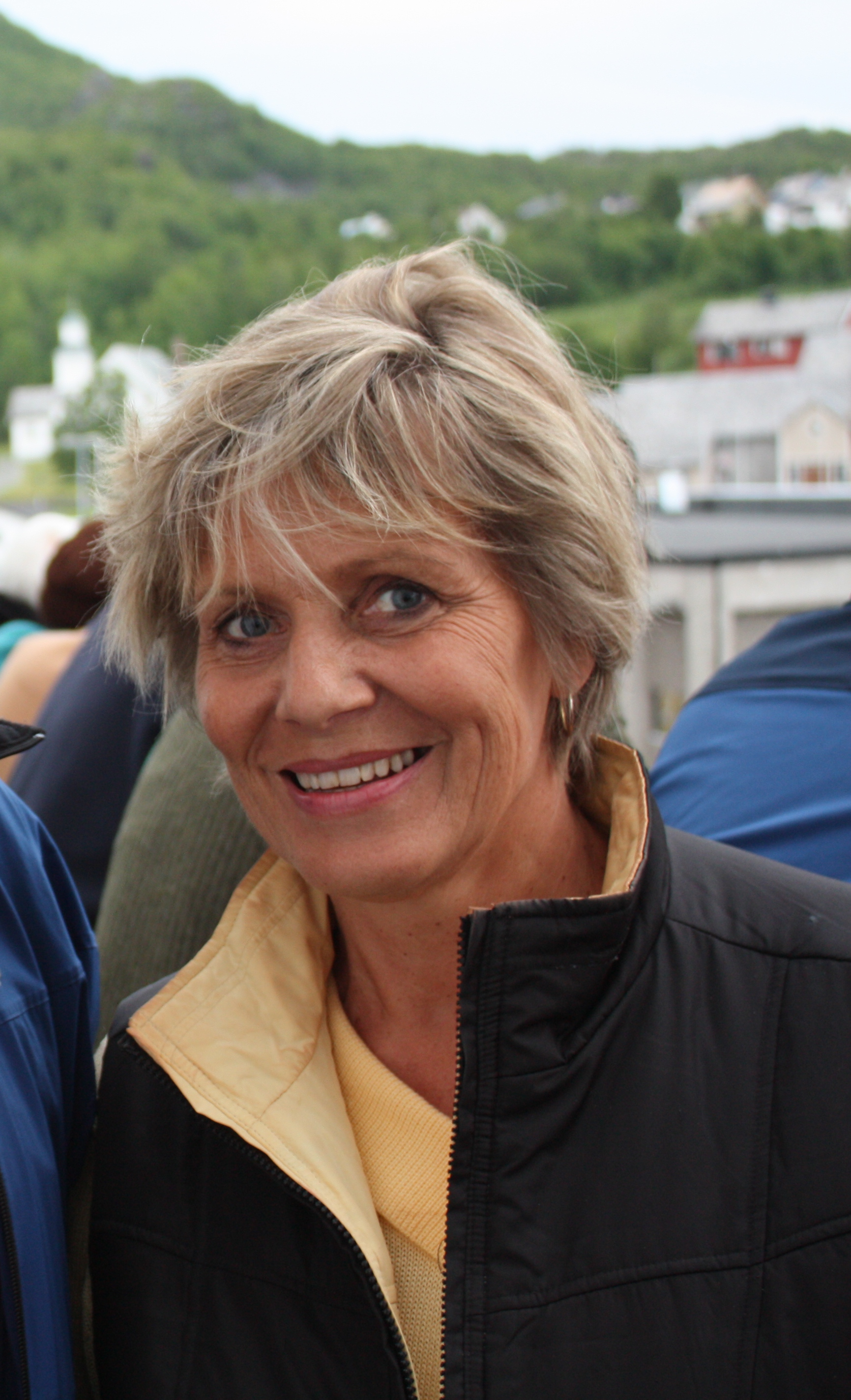
Ragnhild Sælthun Fjørtoft

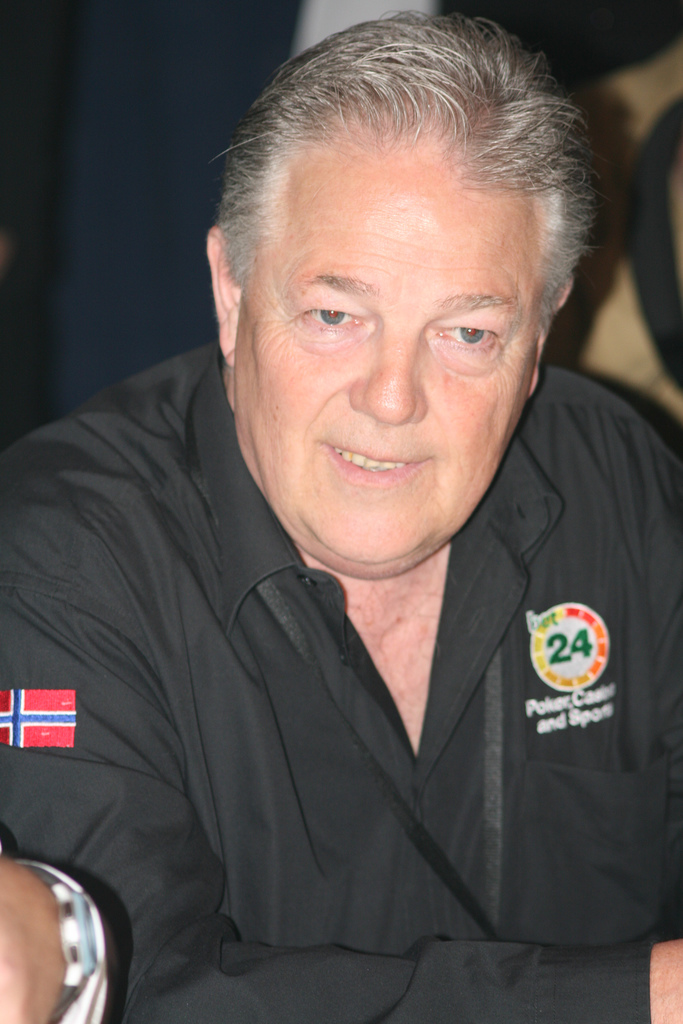
Thor Hansen

- 1 June –
  - Gunnar Kjønnøy, civil servant.
  - Jan Petter Rasmussen, politician.
- 2 June – Mads Gilbert, physician.
- 4 June – Ingolf Mork, ski jumper (died 2012).
- 6 June – Ole Mathias Sejersted, medical doctor.
- 7 June – Hans M. Barstad, theologian (died 2020).
- 8 June – Jan Otto Fredagsvik, politician.
- 9 June – Ragnhild Sælthun Fjørtoft, television presenter.
- 10 June – Finn Jarle Sæle, newspaper editor.
- 11 June – Svein Erik Bakke, entrepreneur (died 2006).
- 13 June – Ketil Haugsand, harpsichordist.
- 14 June – Karen Margrethe Kuvaas, politician
- 23 June – Thor Hansen, professional poker player (died 2018).
- 27 June –
  - Randi Bjørgen, trade unionist.
  - Tron Øgrim, journalist, author and politician (died 2007).
- 28 June – Bjørn Simensen, culture administrator and former journalist (died 2025).

=== July ===
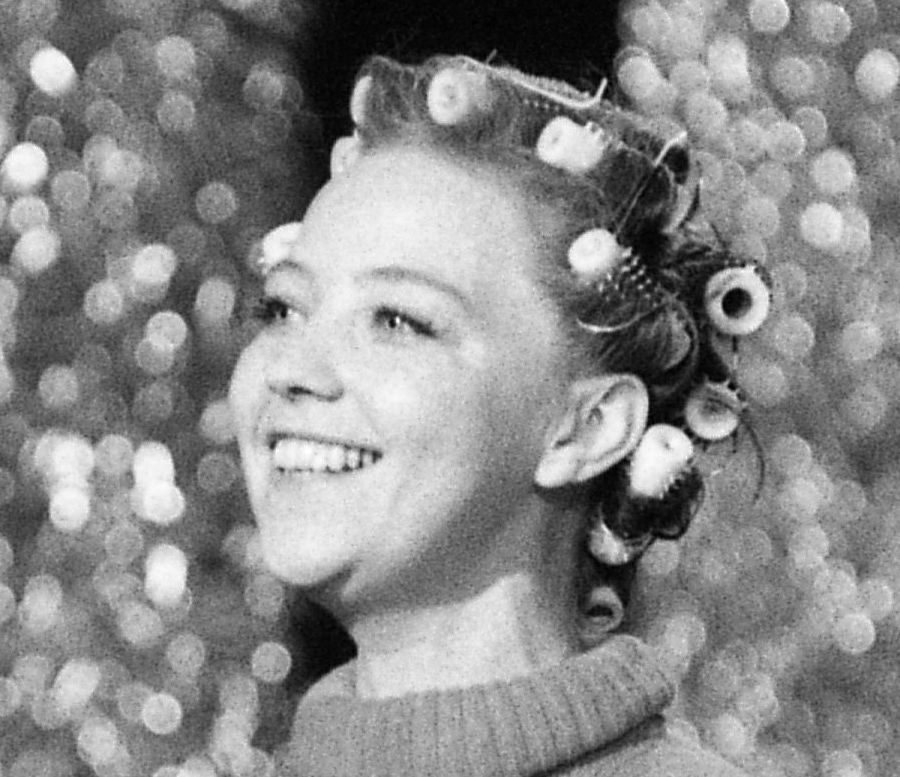
Grethe Kausland

- 1 July – Carl Schiøtz Wibye, diplomat.
- 3 July
  - Rolf Erling Andersen, politician (died 2021)
  - Grethe Kausland, singer, performer and actress (died 2007).
- 5 July
  - Astrid Bekkenes, politician.
  - Sigurd Frisvold, Chief of Defence (died 2022)
- 10 July – Tor Morisse, illustrator (died 2017).
- 18 July – Berit Unn Johansen, figure skater.
- 24 July – Svein Rennemo, businessperson
- 26 July – Kristian Helland, politician
- 28 July – Kjell Øvergård, politician.

=== August ===
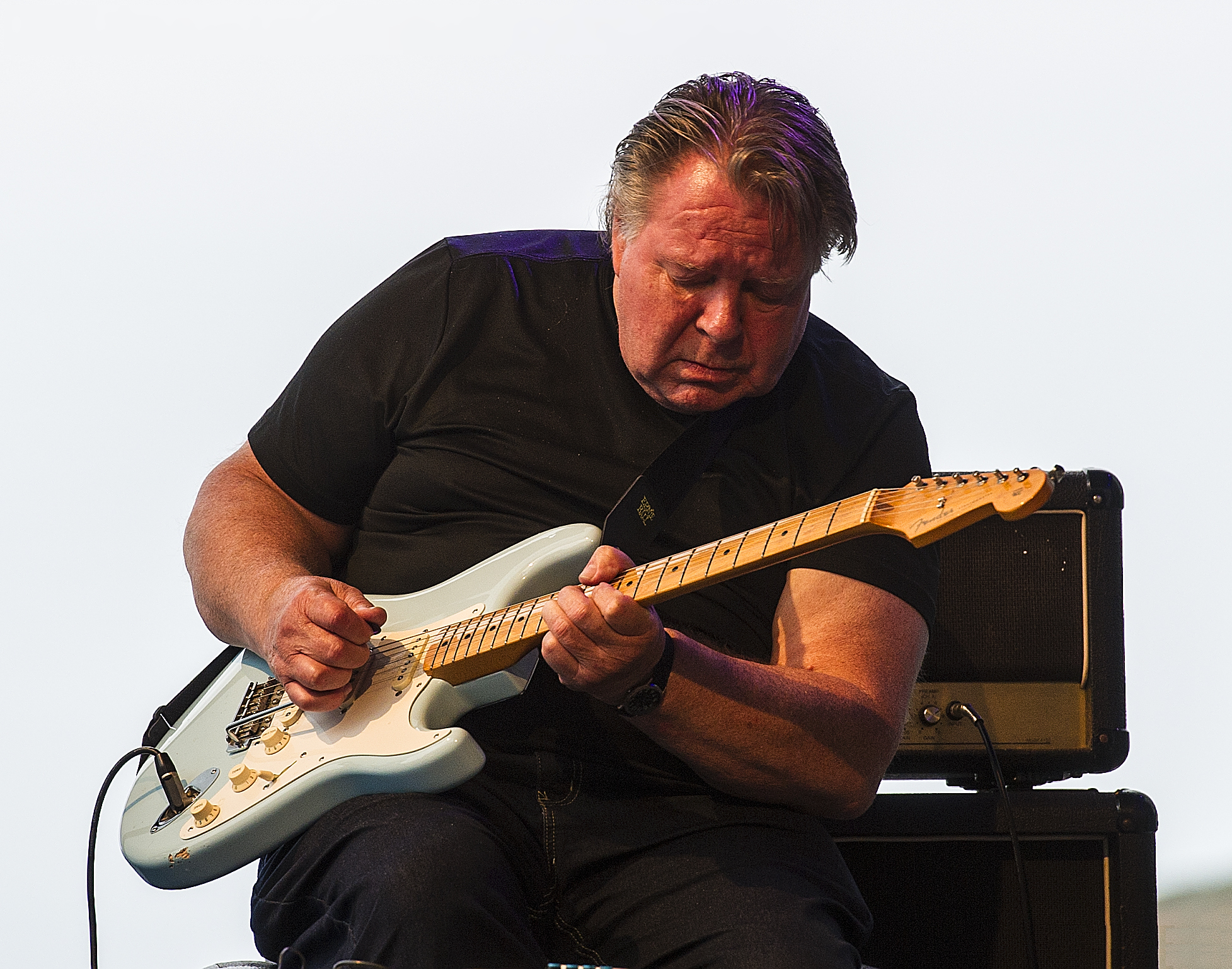
Terje Rypdal

- 1 August – Magnar Sortåsløkken, politician.
- 2 August – Ruth Bakke, organist and composer.
- 4 August – Halvar Hansen, politician.
- 12 August – Ole Henrik Magga, linguist and politician
- 20 August – Per Ravn Omdal, president of the Norwegian Football Association
- 23 August – Terje Rypdal, guitarist and composer
- 28 August – Ellen Holager Andenæs, jurist.

=== September ===
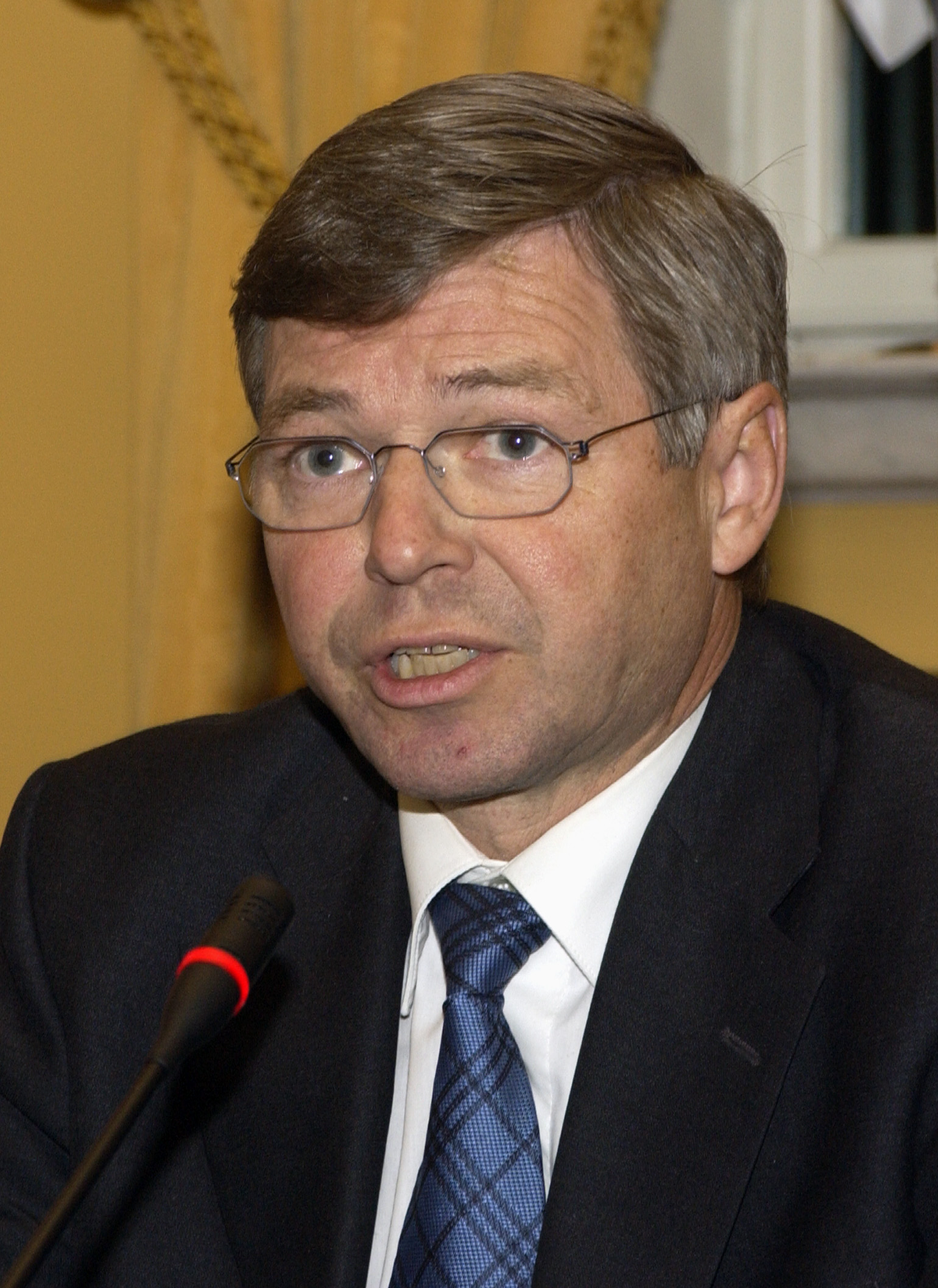
Kjell Magne Bondevik

- 1 September – Jan Jakob Tønseth, author, poet and translator
- 3 September – Kjell Magne Bondevik, Prime Minister (died 2018)
- 12 September – Bjørn Floberg, actor
- 19 September – Knut Karlberg, veterinarian
- 21 September –
  - Liv Jessen, social worker.
  - Åge Tovan, politician.
- 23 September – Morten Strand, soccer player and politician
- 24 September – Erik Hivju, actor
- 25 September – Torhild Staahlen, operatic mezzo-soprano
- 27 September –
  - Svein Kvia, international soccer player (died 2005).
  - Osmund Ueland, business executive.
- 28 September – Gustav Lorentzen, singer-songwriter (died 2010).

=== October ===
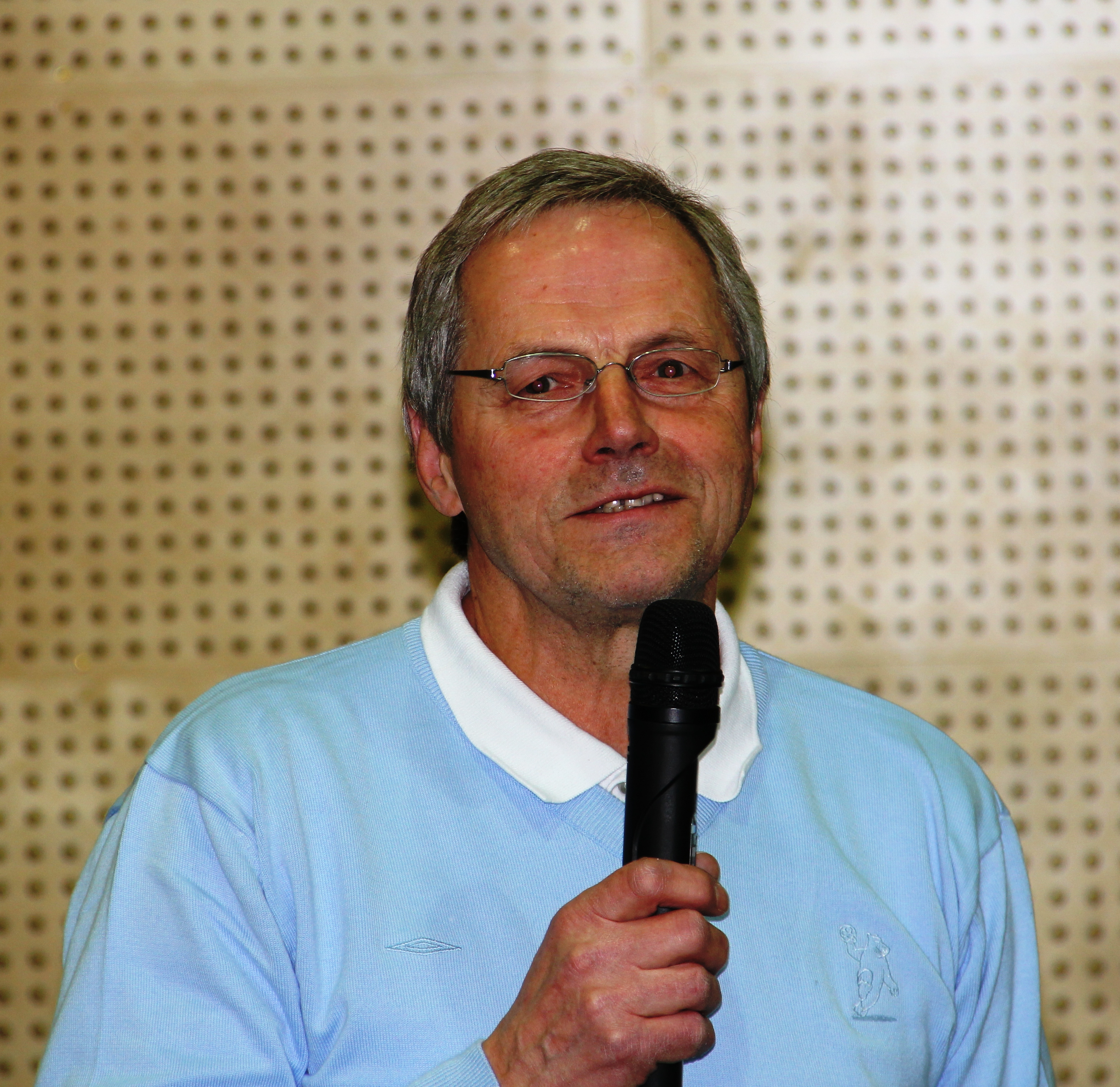
Per Otto Furuseth

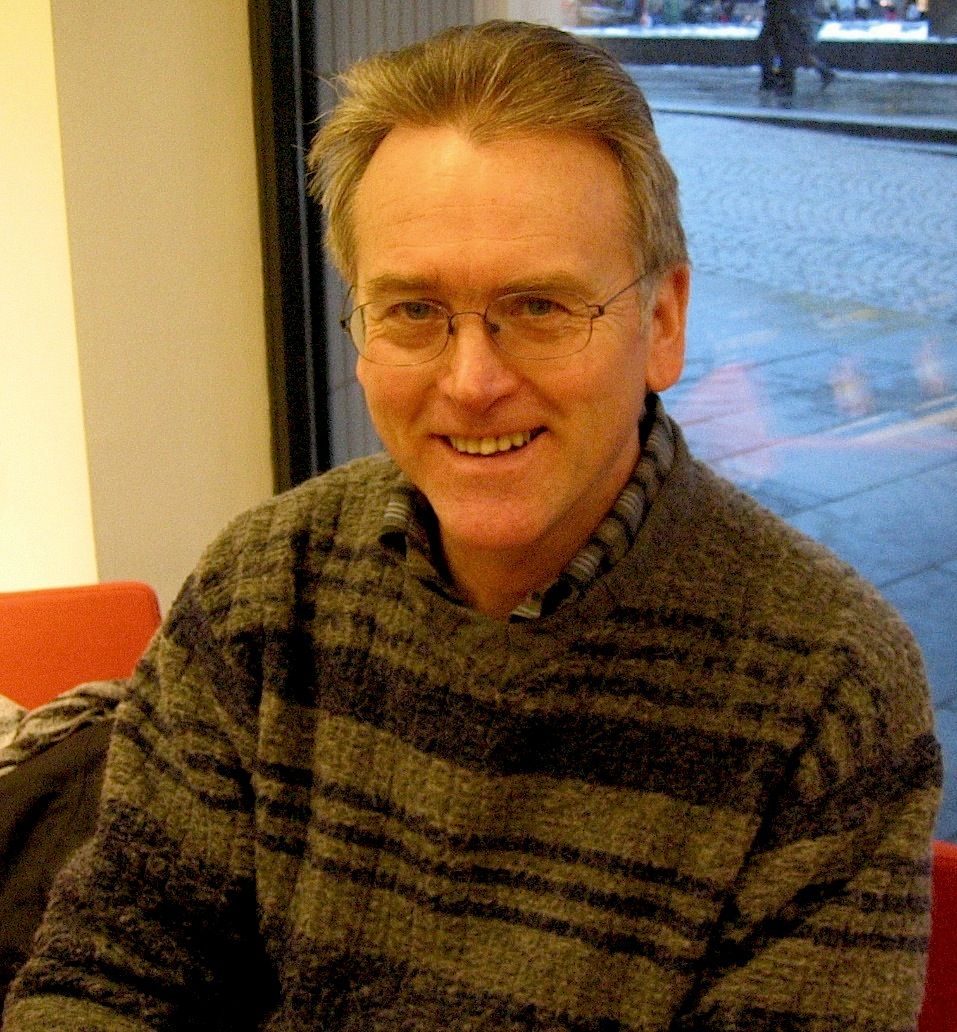
Gunnar Staalesen

- 10 October – Håkon Helgøy, politician.
- 11 October – Sigmund Kroslid, politician.
- 14 October – Per Otto Furuseth, handball player, coach and administrator.
- 19 October – Gunnar Staalesen, writer
- 26 October – Eli Hagen, secretary.
- 28 October – Sissel Solbjørg Bjugn, writer (died 2011).
- 31 October – Gunhild Elise Øyangen, politician.

=== November ===
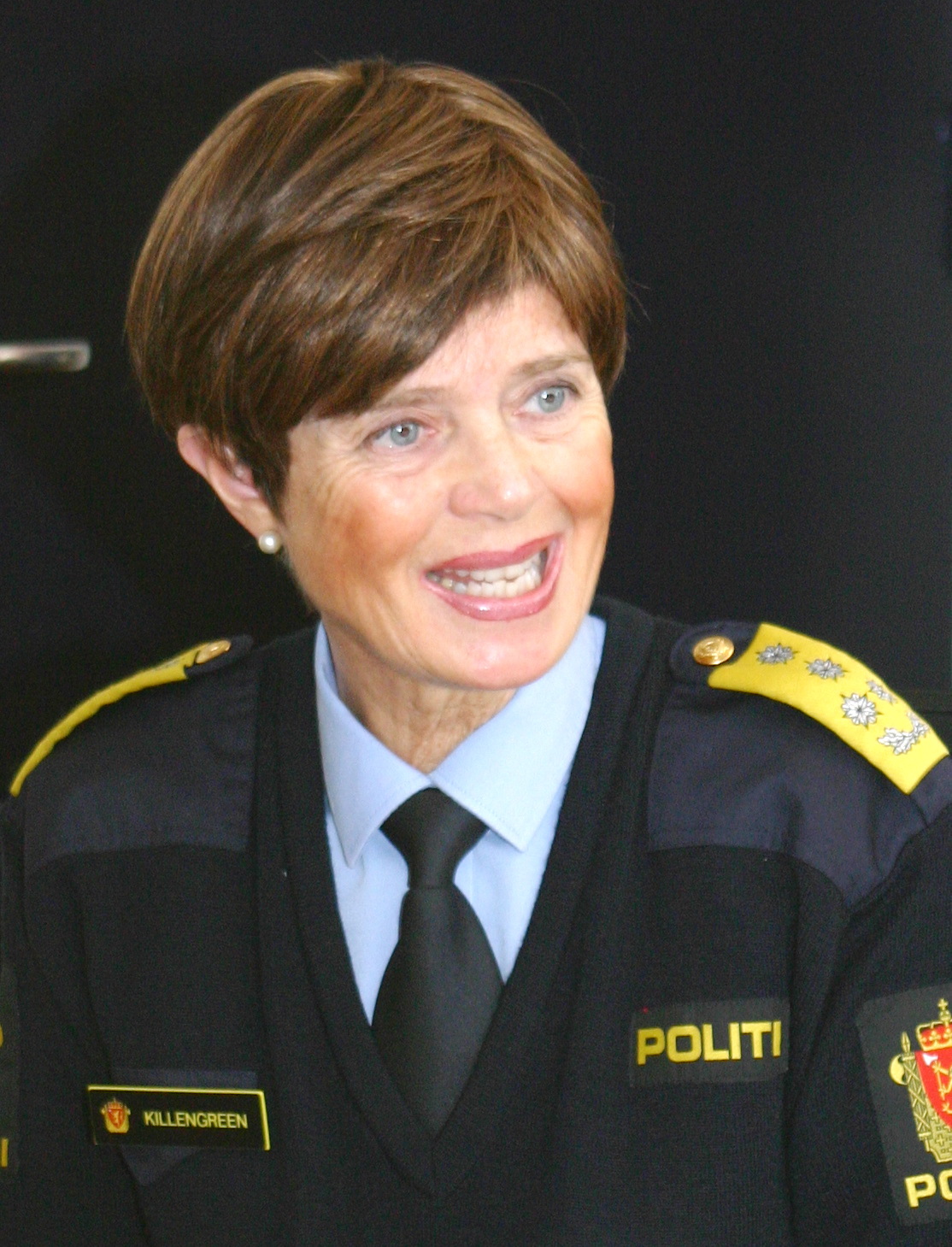
Ingelin Killengreen

- 1 November – Aud Blankholm, trade unionist and civil servant.
- 3 November –
  - Gunnar Flikke, journalist and newspaper editor.
  - Tor Svendsberget, biathlete.
- 5 November – Eyvind Skeie, priest and author
- 12 November – Ingelin Killengreen, jurist and civil servant.
- 18 November – Øyvind Stene, engineer and businessperson
- 19 November – Finn Tveter, rower, Olympic silver medallist and jurist (died 2018).
- 21 November – Lars Ivar Hansen, historian.
- 22 November –
  - Stein Kuhnle, political scientist.
  - Terje Rød-Larsen, diplomat and sociologist
- 24 November – Eva Lundgren, feminist scholar and sociologist
- 30 November – Bjørge Stensbøl, sports executive.

=== December ===
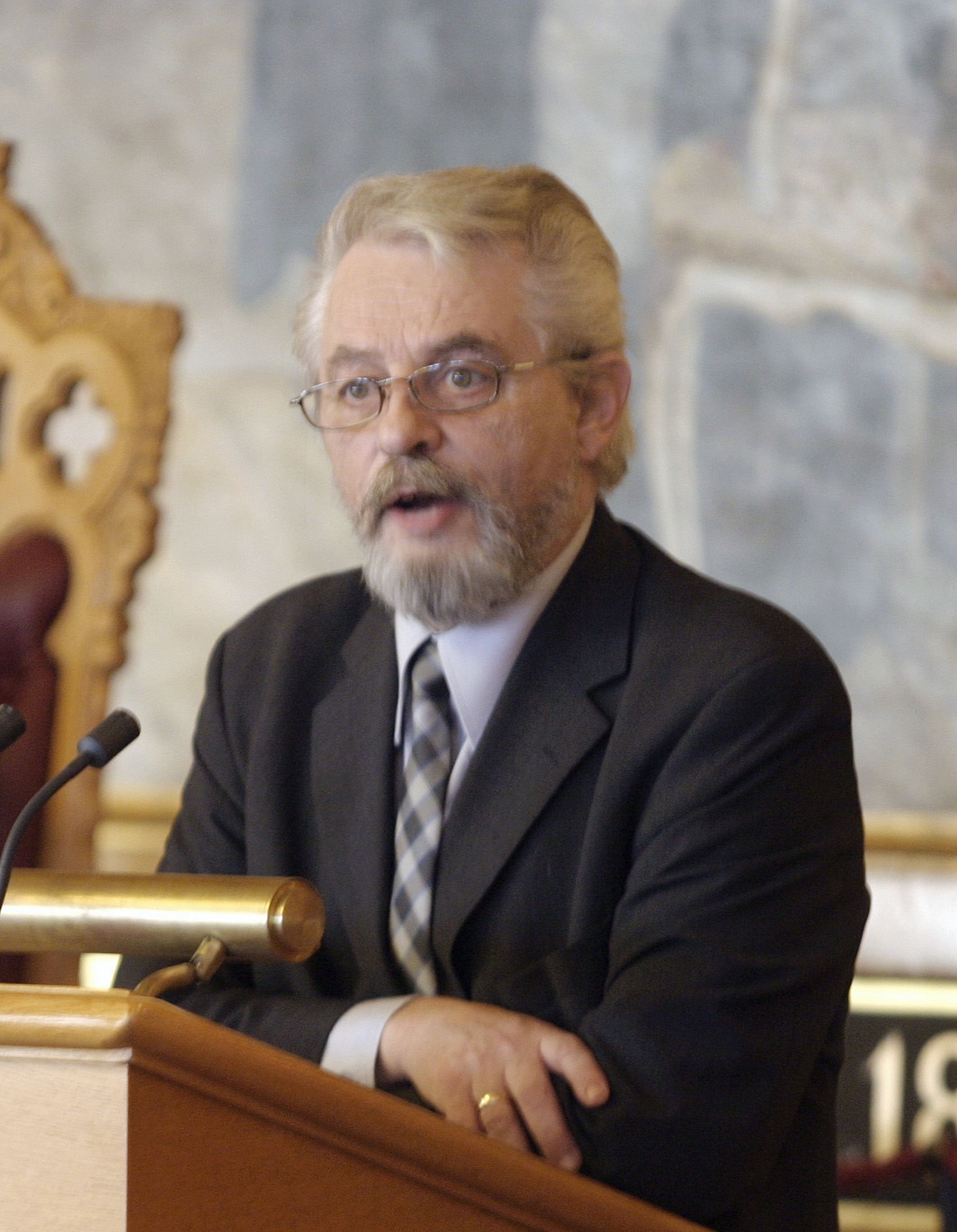
Jørgen Kosmo

- 5 December – Jørgen Kosmo, politician (died 2017).
- 13 December – Alf Egil Holmelid, engineer and politician.
- 16 December – Tore Slagsvold, zoologist.
- 18 December
  - Einar Olav Skogholt, politician (died 2025).
  - Sten Stensen, speed skater and Olympic gold medallist
- 29 December –
  - Solfrid Sivertsen, writer.

=== Full date unknown ===
- Håvard Kjærstad, businessperson
- An-Magritt Jensen, sociologist
- Johan Vold, businessperson

== Notable deaths ==
=== January to June ===
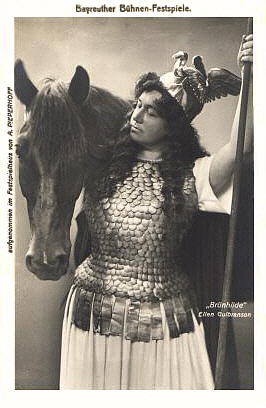
Ellen Gulbranson

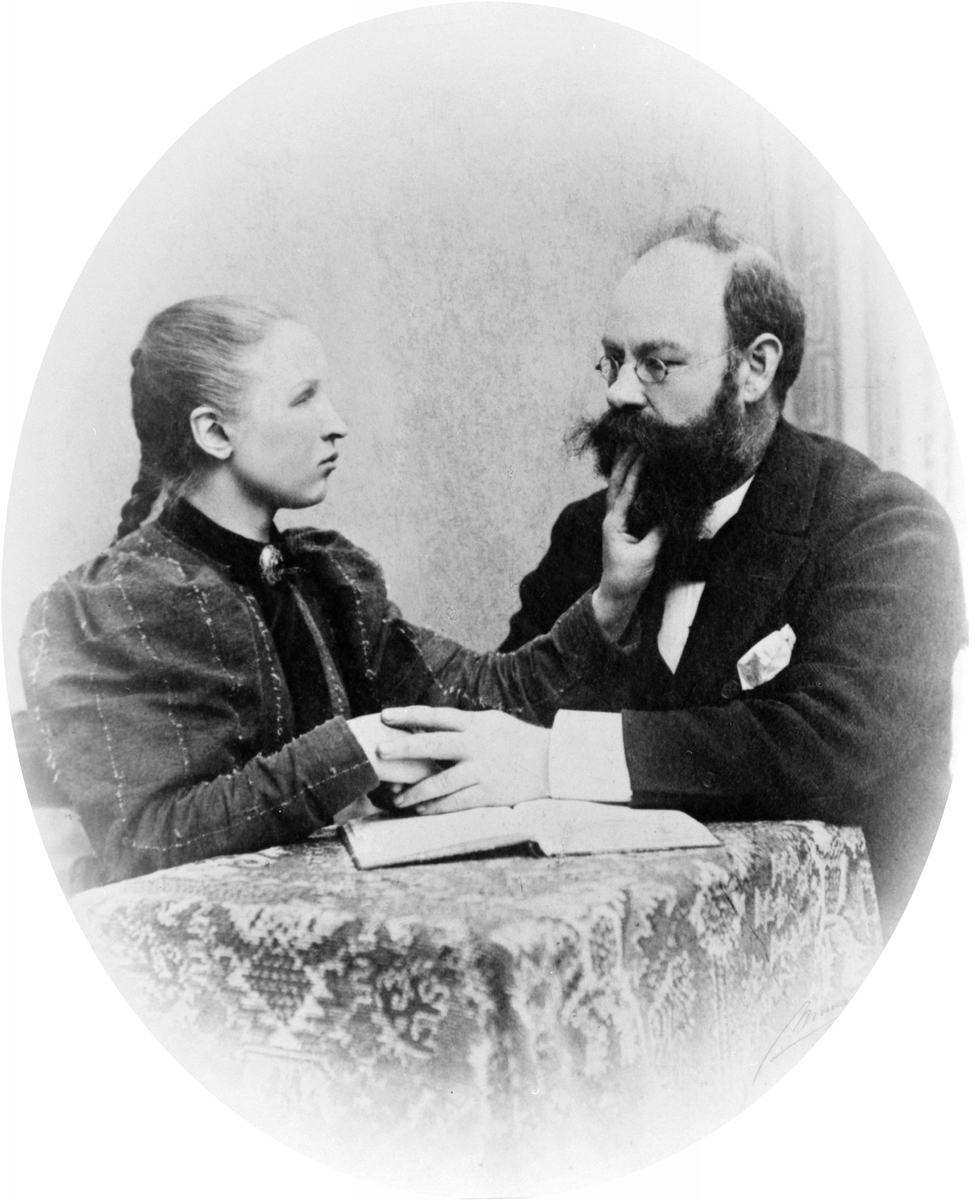
Ragnhild Kåta with Elias Hofgaard

- 1 January – Paul Benjamin Vogt, politician (born 1863).
- 2 January – Ellen Gulbranson, operatic soprano (born 1863).
- 18 January – Johan Adrian Jacobsen, ethnographer (born 1853).
- 29 January – Olav Eysteinson Fjærli, politician (born 1883).
- 12 February – Ragnhild Kåta, first deaf-blind person in Norway to receive proper schooling (born 1873)
- 10 March – Ole Wehus, Nazi collaborator and torturer, executed (born 1909)
- 13 March – Ragnvald Hjerlow, painter (born 1863).
- 20 March – Victor Goldschmidt, mineralogist, petrographer and geochemist pioneer (born 1888).
- 8 April – Olaf Frydenlund, rifle shooter and Olympic silver medallist (born 1862)
- 22 April – Einar Dønnum, Nazi collaborator, executed (born 1897)
- 30 April – Yngvar Bryn, track and field athlete and pairs figure skater (born 1881)
- 23 May – Per Kvist, writer, actor (born 1890).
- 24 May – Øistein Schirmer, gymnast and Olympic gold medallist (born 1879)
- 28 June – Per Steenberg, organist and composer (born 1870)

=== July to December ===
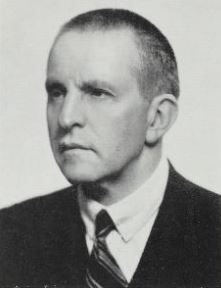
Johan Cappelen

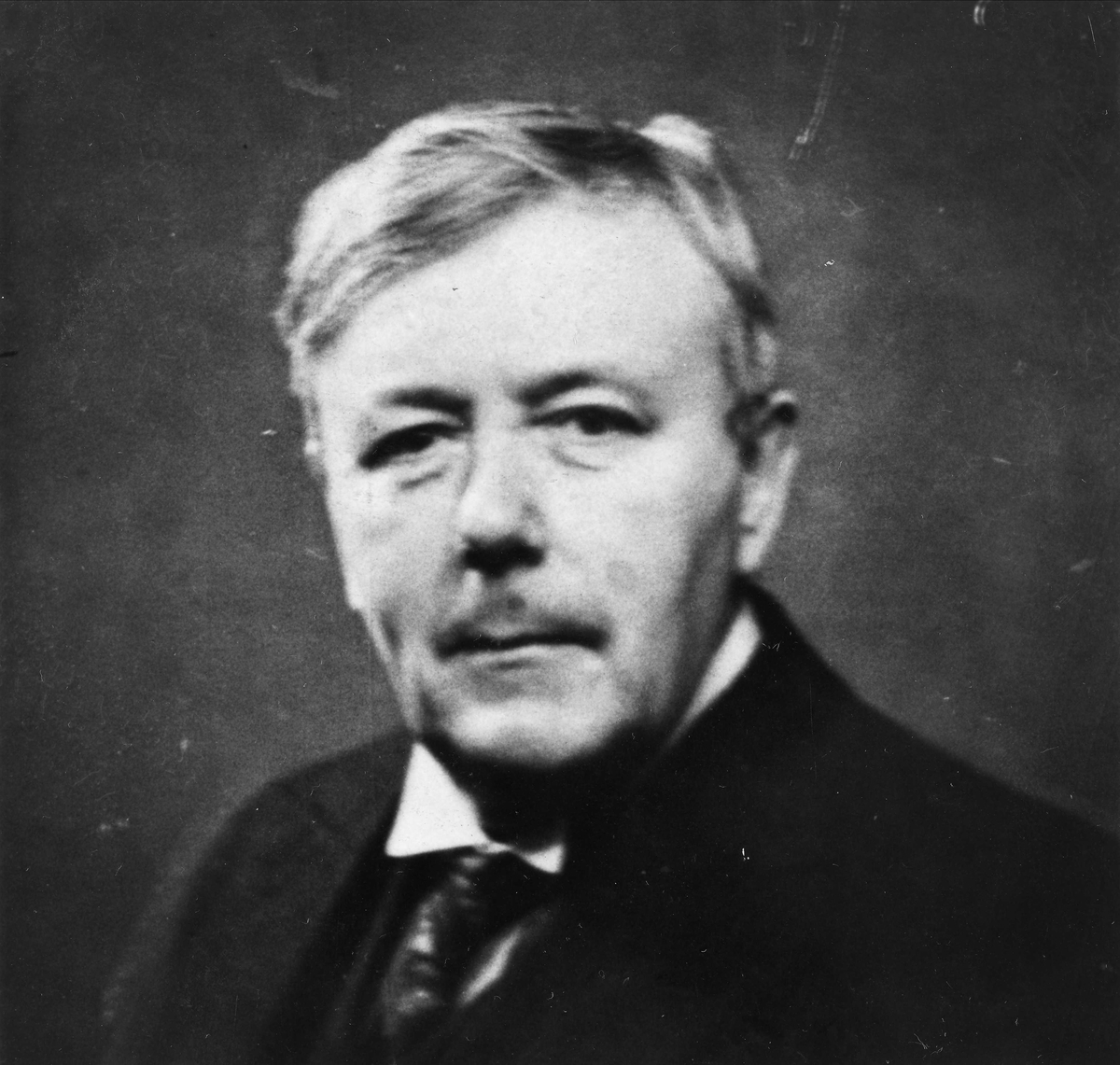
Kristian Elster Jr.

- 1 July – Ivar Aavatsmark, officer and politician (born 1864).
- 1 August – Harald Natvig, rifle shooter and Olympic gold medallist (born 1872).
- 14 August – Theodor Frølich, physician (born 1870).
- 25 August – Julli Wiborg, author of children's books and young girls' novels (born 1880).
- 15 September – Øistein Jakobsen, politician (born 1907)
- 16 September – Eivind Reiersen, newspaper editor and politician (born 1877).
- 1 October – Torje Olsen Solberg, politician (born 1856).
- 15 October – John Johansen, sprinter (born 1883)
- 18 October – Johan Cappelen, jurist and politician (born 1889)
- 21 October
  - Torger Baardseth, bookseller and publisher (born 1875)
  - Per Larssen, politician (born 1881)
- 23 October – Sigurd Christiansen, novelist and playwright (born 1891).
- 3 November – Embrik Strand, arachnologist (born 1876)
- 6 November – Kristian Elster, writer and literary critic (born 1881).
- 20 November – Magnus Nilssen, politician (born 1871).
- 14 December – Arne Børresen, footballer (born 1907 or 1908).

=== Full date unknown ===
- Per Lysne, Rosemaling artist (born 1880)
