= Bronebakk =

Bronebakk is a Norwegian surname. Notable people with the surname include:

- Jørg Willy Bronebakk (born 1947), Norwegian diplomat
- Kristin Bølgen Bronebakk (1950–2012), Norwegian civil servant
