= Vold =

Vold is a Norwegian and Danish surname. Notable people with the surname include:

- Jan Erik Vold (born 1939), Norwegian writer, jazz vocal reciter, and translator
- Johan Vold (born 1947), Norwegian businessperson
- Johannes Vold (born 1945), Norwegian footballer
- Karen Vold (1939–2026), American trick rider
- Marjorie J. Vold (1913–1991), American chemist
- Per Terje Vold (1945–2025), Norwegian civil servant and businessman
- Ragnar Vold (1906–1967), Norwegian journalist

== See also ==
- Wold (disambiguation)
