= Torstein Aagaard-Nilsen =

Norwegian composer (born 1964)

- Born: 11 January 1964 (age 62)
- Origin: Norway
- Genres: orchestra, chamber ensemble, choir, wind band and brass band
- Occupation: Composer
- Website: Official website

Torstein Aagaard-Nilsen (born 11 January 1964) is a Norwegian contemporary composer.

== Life ==
Aagaard-Nilsen was born in Oslo and grew up in Kabelvåg on Lofoten in northern Norway. From 1986 to 1990, he studied at the Bergen Conservatory of Music (now known as the Grieg Academy) and at the University of Bergen. From 1990 to 1994, he worked at the Bergen Conservatory as a teacher of contemporary classical music. Furthermore, he was leader of the Autunnale-festivalen - (Music Factory and Autunnale), also in Bergen.

In 1992 and 1993, he arranged and composed for the Forsvarets Stabsmusikkorps Vestlandet - Norwegian Army Band, Bergen (NABB), writing, among other works, Arctic Landscape. In this period Aagaard-Nilsen wrote many works for wind band and brass band.

As a composer, he has written for orchestra, chamber ensemble, choir, wind band and brass band. Works that exemplify Aagard-Nilsen's focus on narrative and visual aspects in a nearly impulsive form include Fabula I and Fabula II (1996), Sinfonietta (1998) and The Season of Blue Lights (2008) commissioned by BIT20 Ensemble. A stronger focus on expressive elements in Aagard-Nilsen's output is evident in works such as Pierrot's Lament (Concerto for Euphonium and Orchestra), premiered in 2001 with the Lahti Symphony Orchestra. The trumpet concerto Blue Phrases (2007), the sinfonietta The Season of Blue Light and quartet Blue Fragments (2008) are additional examples of Aagard-Nilsen's expressive focus; while the orchestral work Boreas Sings (2012) represents a new direction in which a spectrum of colours and dancing rhythms become evident. 2014 saw his orchestral work Boreas Blæs (2014) premiered by the Norwegian Arctic Philharmonic Orchestra at the opening ceremony of Stormen, Bodø's concert hall.

In 2016, Aagard-Nilsen received the Norwegian Music Publishing Association's Annual Award for his work Dirty Dancing, commissioned and premiered by the Christiania Blåseensemble in 2015.

== Compositions ==
=== For orchestra ===
- 1992/2000 The fourth Angel for trumpet and sinfonietta
- 1995–1996 Concerto for Cello and Orchestra
- 1996 Concerto for Trumpet and String Orchestra - Hommage
- 1997 rev.2003 The Cry of Fenrir - Concerto for Tuba and Orchestra
- 1998 Concerto for Trombone and String Orchestra
- 2000 Pierrot's Lament - Concerto for Euphonium and Orchestra
- 2003 Fanfares and Fairytales (Concerto No. 2 for Trombone and Orchestra)
- 2007 "Wind Eyes"

=== For wind band ===
- 1992 Arctic Landscape for Military Band
- 1994 Preludium for Symphonic Band
- 1994 Triade - "The Angels of Destruction" for large wind ensemble
- 1998 Pang - Introduction No. 4 for Symphonic Band
- 2001 Concerto for Large Wind Ensemble (Pentagram)
  1. Call and Awakening
  2. Ritual I
  3. De Profundis
  4. Ritual II
  5. Call and Conclusion
- 2002 Cantilena Cradle Song for solo trombone and wind band
- 2002 Wings of Changes for Wind Ensemble (Recordinglabel SIMAX)
- 2002 "Cantilena: Cradle song for trombone and wind band"
- 2004 Cantilena II: Mountain Song for euphonium and wind ensemble
- 2004 "The Playground Project"
- 2006 "Cantilena III for 3 trombones and wind ensemble
- 2013 Ljodgata for Wind Band
- 2015 Dirty Dancing, premiered by Christiania Blåseensemble conducted by Peter Szilvay

=== For brass band ===
- 1988 Circius (various recordings)
- 1989 Abstractions
- 1990 Entrada : Introduction No. 2
- 1990-1991 Awakening
- 1991 The Binding of the Wolf
- 1993 Concerto for Bb Cornet and Brass Band
- 1996 Seid (also a version B from 2009) (recording on DOYEN)
- 1998 Riffs and Interludes
- 1998/1999 Dynamis - Missa Sophia (recording on LAWO)
- 1999 "Mosquito for trombone and brass band
- 2000 Vikingkirken (The Viking Church) for Brass Band
- 2002/2005 "Myth"
- 2003 Aubade - Dawn Songs of the Fabulous Birds (test piece for the 2003 European Brass Band Competition in Bergen, Norway)
- 2003 Bloodaxe Lament for Tuba and Brass Band
- 2005 "Klotho"
- 2005 Hommage á Wolfgang Amadeus Mozart
- 2006 "Steam Songs"
- 2006 Cantigas (recording on LAWO)
- 2007 "Blue Phrases" for solo trumpet, electronics and brass band
- 2007 "Chant" (recording on LAWO)
- 2007/2008 "Totem" Concerto gross for brass band and electronics
- 2009 "Euphonium Concerto"

=== For choir ===
- 1992 Ensomme skip for female choir (SSAA) - text (Norwegian): Rolf Jacobsen
- 1994/2010 Bølgje for mixed choir - text (Norwegian): Halldis Moren Vesaas
- 1996 "I otta du rise" for male choir (TTBB)
- 2001/2002 Aldri før... for mixed choir - text (Norwegian): Rolf Jacobsen
- 2002 Et annet lys for mixed choir - text (Norwegian): Stein Mehren
- 2005 "Sorg" fir male choir - text (Norwegian): Stein Mehren
- 2008 "Jolekvad (variations on In Dulci Jubilo) for two female choir

=== Vocal works with orchestral or instrumental accompaniment ===
- 1990/1991 Jacobsen sanger for baritone and trumpet text: Rolf Jacobsen
- 1999 Det andre lyset for voice, saxophone, trombone and piano text: Stein Mehren

=== Cantatas and masses ===
- 1994 Vår jord, vår Evighet cantata for Tromsø on the occasion of the 200-year anniversary, for soprano, baritone, mixed choir, wind band and strings - text: Rolf Jacobsen
  1. Preludium
  2. Det ryker
  3. Små lys på havet
  4. Nord
  5. Sol i sorg
  6. Hyss
- 1998/1999 Dynamis - Missa sophia for cornet, trombone, tuba, percussion and brass band

=== Piano ===
- 1993 Hot-house - Drivhus
- 2000/2002 "Views"
- 2006 "Akvarell (Watercolour) (for Rune Alver)
- 2008 "Nattsvermer (for Rune Alver)
- 2009 "Lofotbrev (for Rune Alver)
- 2010 "Blue Traces" (for Rune Alver)

=== Chamber music ===
- 1989/95 "Four Lyric Pieces" for solo EUphonium
- 1990 "Black Rain" for solo Euphonium
- 1991 Black Light for recorder, violin, singer (alto) and piano, version 2: for recorder, violin, cello and harpsichord, version 3: for flute, oboe, violin and piano
- 1992/2001 "The Fourth Angel" for trumpet and sinfonietta
- 1993 Novelle for Brass Ensemble for 4 trumpets, 3 trombones, bass trombone, French horn and tuba
- 1996 Fabula I for flute, clarinet, vibraphone, piano, 2 violins, viola, cello and double bass
- 1996 Fabula II for oboe, bassoon, French horn, trumpet, trombone, percussion, 2 violins, viola, cello and double bass
- 1996/98 "Sinfonietta" (1. Fabula III, 2. Fabula IV, 3. Fabula V, 4. Singing Landscape) for sinfonietta
- 1998 Crossing Lines quartet for trombone, accordion, violin and cello
- 1998 Glance of a Landscape quartet for percussion
- 1999 Light for trombone and percussion
- 1999 "Two Insects" for Solo Euphonium
- 2000 "Spin" for brass quintet
- 2001 "Kyklos" for brass quintet
- 2002 Winds of Change for Oboe, E♭ clarinet, 3 B♭ clarinets, Bass Clarinet, and 2 Saxophones
- 2003 "Knock" for percussion trio
- 2005 "Of Night and Darkness" for trombone quartet
- 2008 "Blue Fragments" for Piano trio and percussion
- 2008 "The Season of Blue Lights" for sinfonietta
- 2009 "Song for Kharon" for tuba and electronics
- 2010 "Orpheus Lament" for trumpet and electronics
- 2016 "Musical Doodles" for accordion and cello

== Discography ==
- Rune Alver, Blaue Blume (2011)
- Staff Band of the Norwegian Armed Forces, Håkon Austbø, Peter Szilvay, Oiseaux exotiques (2009)
- Eikanger-Bjørsvik Musikklag, Staff Band of the Norwegian Armed Forces, Frisk Pust (2008)
- Ning Trio, Works by Barrett, Hagen, Buene, Aagaard-Nilsen, Apollyon (2004)
- Bodø Sinfonietta, Singing Landscape (2003)
- Helge Haukås, Jaren Marching Band, Silver Mountain (2002)
- Einar Røttingen, Avgarde (2000)
- Rolf Gupta, Stavanger Brass Band, The Colour-Gobbler: Stavanger Brass Band presents contemporary brass band music (1996)
- Eikanger-Bjørsvik Musikklag, Kings Messenger (1995)
- David King, Introduction (1995)
- Eikanger-Bjørsvik Musikklag, Light (1990)
