= Micaelsen =

Micaelsen is a surname. Notable people with the surname include:

- Frank Stubb Micaelsen (1947–2013), Norwegian schoolteacher, poet, and novelist
- Torgeir Micaelsen (born 1979), Norwegian politician
- Vera Micaelsen (1974–2018), Norwegian television journalist and author

== See also ==
- Michaelsen
