= Torje =

Family name

Torje is both a given name and a surname. Notable people with the name include:

- Gabriel Torje (born 1989), Romanian footballer
- Torje Olsen Solberg (1856–1947), Norwegian politician
