= Ida Børresen =

Norwegian civil servant

- Born: 26 September 1950 (age 75); Oslo, Norway
- Education: cand.polit.
- Occupation: civil servant

Ida Børresen (born 26 September 1950) is a Norwegian civil servant.

== Early life ==
Børresen was born in Oslo on 26 September 1950, and is educated as cand.polit.

== Career ==
Børresen was assigned to the Ministry of Justice from 1982 to 1990. She served as deputy under-secretary of state (ekspedisjonssjef) from 1998 to 2005, and assisting under-secretary of state (assisterende departementsråd) 2005–06, in the Ministry of Church Affairs, Education and Research. She was appointed director of Utlendingsdirektoratet from 2006 to 2012, and managing director of the Storting from 2012 to 2018.

In February 2018 she announced her resignation as managing director of the Storting.

Preceded by Manuela Ramin-Osmundsen	Director of Utlendingsdirektoratet; 2006–2012	Succeeded by Frode Forfang
Preceded by Hans Brattestå	Managing director of the Storting; 2012–2018	Succeeded by Kyrre Grimstad (acting)
