= Overgard =

Overgard or Øvergård is a surname. Notable people with the surname include:

- Elling Øvergård (1947–1999), Norwegian sports shooter
- Kjell Øvergård (born 1947), Norwegian politician
- William Overgard (1926–1990), American cartoonist and writer
