= Hugo Parr =

Norwegian physicist, civil servant and politician

Hugo Ragnar Parr (born 23 April 1947) is a Norwegian physicist, civil servant and politician for the Labour Party.

He was born in Asker. He took the B.Sc. degree in physics in 1968 and the M.Sc. degree in 1969, at the University of Washington. He was a research assistant and research fellow from 1970 to 1976, including a spell at the Norwegian Defence Research Establishment in 1972. He took the dr.philos. degree at the University of Oslo in 1976. From 1977 to 1978 he worked as a researcher under the NTNF programme.

In 1978 he was appointed as assistant secretary in the Ministry of Petroleum and Energy, and went on to Det Norske Veritas in 1984. From 1986 to 1987 he was a head of department in the National Institute of Technology, then deputy under-secretary of state in the Ministry of Trade and Industry. In 1992 he applied unsuccessfully for the position as director of the Research Council of Norway. He instead continued in the Ministry of Trade, until moving to the Ministry of Modernization in 2004. From 2005 it was named the Ministry of Government Administration and Reform.

Parr was a member of the International Energy Agency research committee from 1978 til 1984, of the EUREKA high-level group from 1988 to 1989 and 1993 to 1995 (chairman 1993 to 1994) and the EFTA research committee from 1988 to 1991 (chairman from 1990). He also chaired the council of the European Space Agency from 1996 to 1999. From 2001 to 2004 he chaired the Norwegian Chess Federation. He resides in Nittedal, and was a member of the municipal council from 1995 to 1999. He has also been a board member of Nittedal Energiverk and Development Fund, and a council member of the environmental organization Future in Our Hands. He is a fellow of the Norwegian Academy of Technological Sciences.
