= Tone Birkeland =

Norwegian literary scholar

- Born: 8 May 1947 (age 79); Bergen
- Education: University of Bergen
- Awards: Brage Prize

Tone Birkeland (born 8 May 1947) is a Norwegian literary scholar who has contributed to research on children's literature and picture books.

== Career ==
Born in Bergen on 8 May 1947, Birkeland graduated as cand.philol. from the University of Bergen in 1973. Spending most of her career at Høgskolen i Bergen, her research has focused on children's literature and picture books.

For the textbook Soria Moria she was awarded the Brage Prize in 1992, along with Håkon Askeland, Ingeborg Askeland, Anna A. Knudsen, Øyvind Knudsen, and Kjersti Werner.

Her work Norsk barneliteraturhistorie earned her the Kari Skjønsberg Prize in 1997, shared with co-authors Gunvor Risa and Karin Beate Vold. In his literary history from 1998, Øystein Rottem particularly mentions Norsk barneliteraturhistorie as an important source for the treatment of children's literature in his work.
