= Dag Roger Rinde =

Norwegian businessperson (born 1961)

Dag Roger Rinde (born 1961) is a Norwegian businessperson.

He is the managing director of Statoil Norway and a member of the board at the Norwegian Petroleum Institute.
