= Hanne Aga =

Norwegian poet (1947–2019)

- Born: 28 March 1947; Røra, Norway
- Died: 17 March 2019 (aged 71); Tromsø
- Occupation: Poet

Hanne Aga (28 March 1947 − 17 March 2019) was a Norwegian poet. She was born in Røra. She made her literary debut in 1981 with the poetry collection Skjering med lys. Her next collections are Forsvar håpet from 1983 and Hard, klar rose from 1985. Bror Sorg from 1986 is a poetic novel which describes a love relation between sister and brother, where citations from psalms are included in the text. The poetry collection Presis Overalt (1988) contains short poems. Further collections are Utan bevis from 1991, Gå i skuggen/vent på vinden (1993), Solis (2000), Eit rom å falle inn i (2005), and Som om ein ny dag skal komme from 2008. In his treatment of Norwegian post-World War II literature, Øystein Rottem describes the principle narrative themes of Aga's writings as the relation between body and mind, and between perception and poetic language.

From 1992 to 1994 Aga was a member of the literary council of the Norwegian Authors' Union. She died in Tromsø on 17 March 2019.
