= Norwegian Petroleum Institute =

- Company type: Lobbying organization
- Founded: 1970
- Headquarters: Oslo, Norway
- Key people: Inger-Lise M. Nøstvik (secretary general); Håvard Kjærstad (board chairman)
- Website: www.np.no

The Norwegian Petroleum Institute (Norwegian: Norsk Petroleumsinstitutt) is a Norwegian petroleum lobbying organization formed in 1970. Its purpose is to "attend to and promote the common interest of the [petroleum] industry".

The petroleum companies Esso Norge, YX Energi Norge, Norske Shell, Statoil Norge, AGA AS, Castrol Norge, Yara Industrial, Nynas, Valvoline Oil and Progas are behind the Norwegian Petroleum Institute. It also has ties with the Confederation of Norwegian Enterprise. Its board consists of Håvard Kjærstad (ESSO), Tage Kruse (YX), Lars Inge Lunde (Shell), Dag Roger Rinde (Statoil), Sven Borger Fiedler (Castrol) and secretary Inger-Lise M. Nøstvik.

It has been criticized for manufacturing quasi-journalistic information and news, which was picked up by the Norwegian news media, and eventually had political impact.
