= Rolf Jacobsen (poet) =

Norwegian poet, writer (1907–1994)

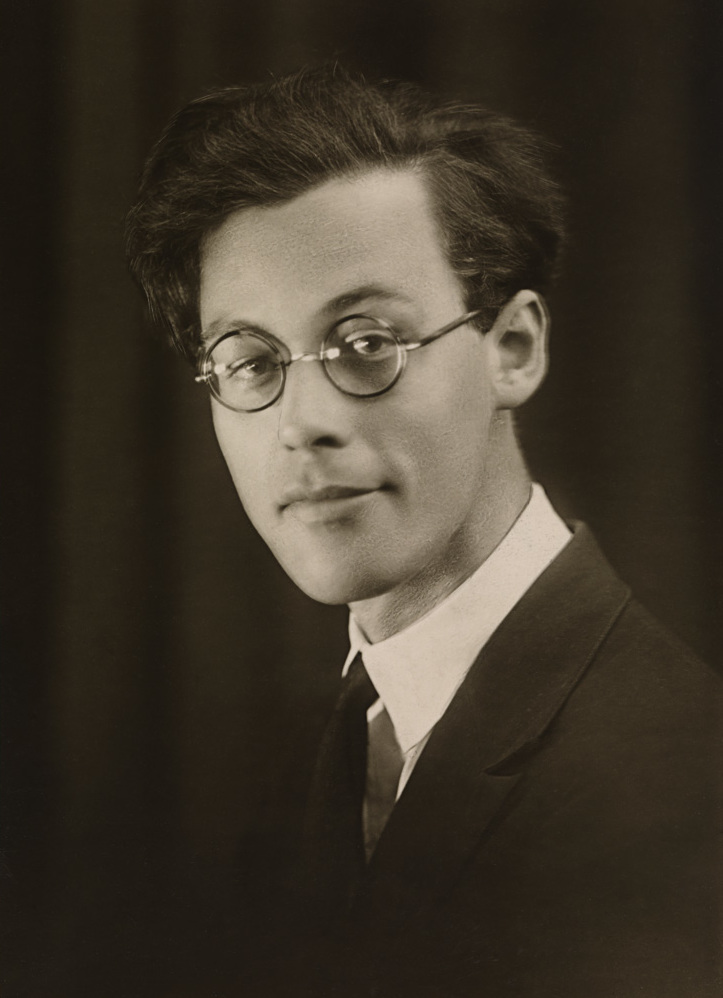
Rolf Jacobsen (1933)

Rolf Jacobsen (8 March 1907 – 20 February 1994) was a Norwegian writer.

Jacobsen could be said to be the first modernist writer in Norway. Jacobsen's career as a writer spanned more than fifty years. He is one of Scandinavia’s most distinguished poets, who launched poetic modernism in Norway with his first book, Jord og jern in 1933. Jacobsen's work has been translated into over twenty languages. The central theme in his work is the balance between nature and technology – he was called "the Green Poet" in Norwegian literature.

== Youth ==
Rolf Jacobsen was born in Oslo (then called Kristiania), as the son of Martin Julius Jacobsen (1865–1944), who had completed both medical and dental school, and Marie (Nielsen) Jacobsen (1880–1953) a nurse. At the age of six he moved with his family to Åsnes, where Martin Jacobsen had obtained a post as a school dentist. Rolf was educated by his mother, who had completed one year of teacher's training. In 1920 he moved to Oslo and entered a private school. During these years his uncle, who was a railway engineer, looked after him. Jacobson continued his studies at the University of Oslo for five years without graduating. In 1927 he served in the Norwegian army for six weeks.

From 1937 to 1939 he was a board member of Hedmark Labour Party.

== Early career ==
Jacobsen's Jord og jern, written in free verse, introduced the urban world, racing cars, airplanes, and electrical turbines. Because of the choice of his subjects Jacobsen's work was connected to Marinetti and Futurism, but his view was all but romantic. He did not share the Futurists' euphoria over modern inventions, the beauty of "a roaring motorcar, which runs like a machine-gun," but saw the relationship between machines and human civilization as more complex. Jacobsen's diverse literary and other artistic influences included the Poetic Edda, Karel Čapek's play R.U.R., and Carl Sandburg's poetry. The title of the collection also suggests a cyclic relationship between nature and technology.

In 1934 Jacobsen returned to Åsnes to take care of his father. He had joined a socialist intellectual group, Clarté, and in Åsnes he became a member of the Labor Party Leadership for Hedmark County. In Åsnes, Jacobsen worked for the daily newspaper Kongsvinger Arbeiderblad, which was supported by Labor. Jacobsen's second collection of poems, Vrimmel (1935), revealed his underlying dismay at modern civilization. Jacobsen rejected Marinetti's manifesto, "We wish to glory war...", but predicted the ominous emergence of the gas masks and machine guns. After Vrimmel, Jacobsen was silent as a poet for 16 years.

== German Occupation years ==
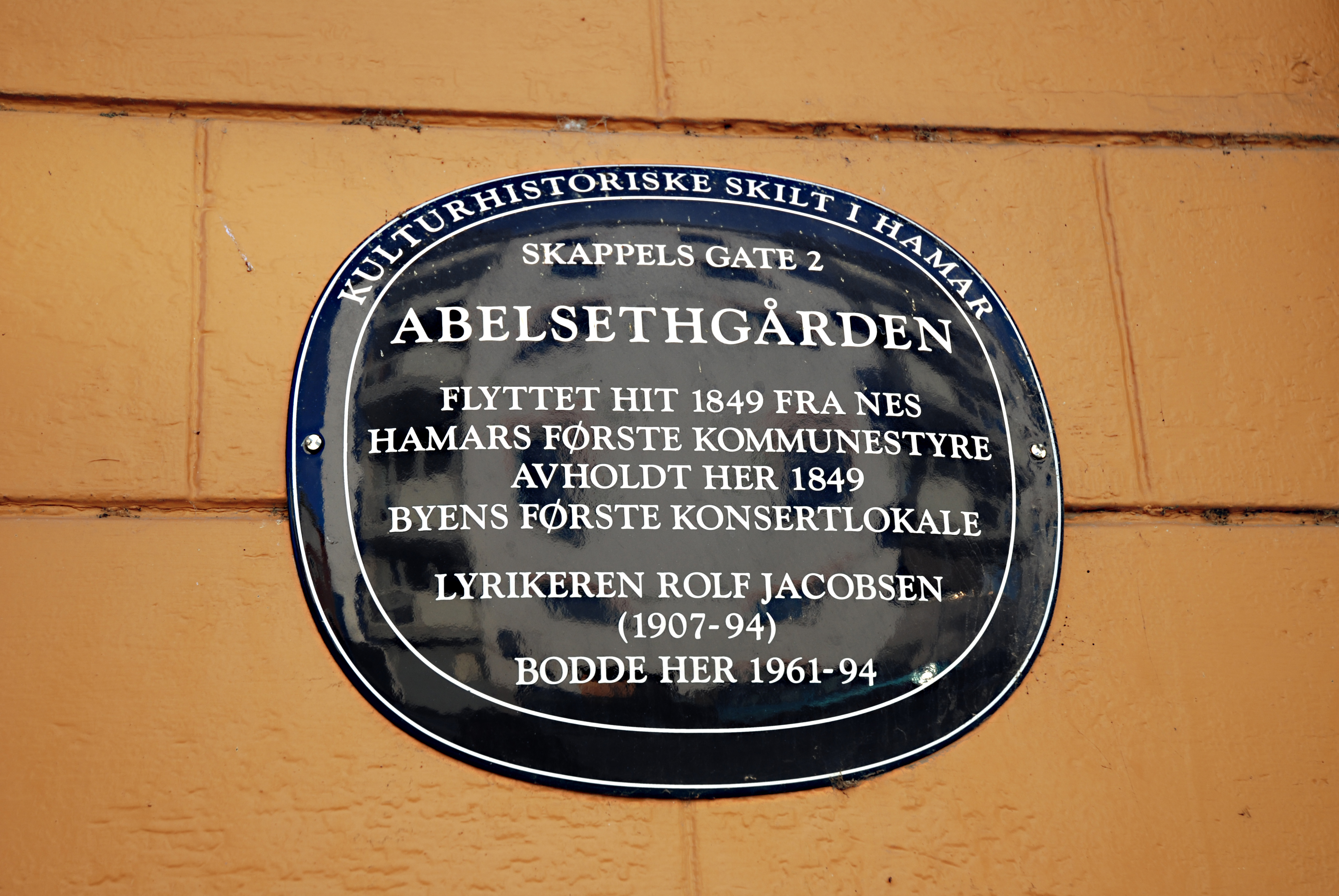
Sign at former home of Rolf Jacobsen in Abelsethgården

During the Occupation of Norway by Nazi Germany (1940–1945), Jacobsen signed and published in Kongsvinger Arbeiderblad editorials that supported the German occupiers. He was also a member of the Norwegian National Socialist Party. After the liberation of Norway at the end of World War II, Jacobsen was convicted of treason and sentenced to three and a half years at hard labor.

After his internment, Jacobsen settled at Abelsethgården in the city of Hamar. He worked as a bookseller for ten years, and then as a journalist and night editor for the newspaper Hamar Stifstidende. In 1950 he converted to Roman Catholicism, and in 1951, Jacobsen published his third collection of poems, Fjerntog. The poems were traditional in form. In this work and in Hemmelig liv (1954), Jacobsen expressed his troubled compassion for the world around him. A new theme was the rough and lonely Norwegian scenery.

Jacobsen often expressed ironically his doubts about technology, and praised the blessings of little joys. Sometimes he used humor, sometimes his poems had hymnlike solemnity. In Hamar, Jacobsen lived in an old wooden house near Lake Mjøsa and the railroad. These surroundings he also described in his poems. Jacobsen's later books include Pass for dørene – dørene lukkes (1972), Pusteøvelse (1975), and Tenk på noe annet (1979).

== Personal life ==
Jacobsen was engaged for a time to Elisabeth Wiborg, daughter of author Julli Wiborg. In 1940 Jacobsen married Petra Tendø (1912–1983); they had two sons; Trond Tendø Jacobsen and Bjørn Tendø Jacobsen. While his parents' marriage did not succeed, Jacobsen's own marriage was harmonious. After his wife's death, in his last book, Nattåpent (1985), Jacobsen published tender and mournful poems about their life together: "Whoever loves for years / hasn't lived in vain." He died in 1994 and was buried at Hamar kirkegård in Hamar.

== Bibliography ==
- Jord og jern ('Earth and Iron') – poetry (1933)
- Vrimmel ('Swarm') – poetry (1935)
- Fjerntog (Express Train) – poetry (1951)
- Hemmelig liv ('Secret Life') – poetry (1954)
- Sommeren i gresset ('Summer in the Grass') – poetry (1956)
- Brev til lyset ('Letter to the Light') – poetry (1960)
- Stillheten efterpå ('The Silence Afterwards') – poetry (1965)
- Headlines – poetry (1969)
- Pass for dørene - dørene lukkes ('Mind the Doors - The Doors are Closing') – poetry (1972)
- Pusteøvelse ('Breathing exercise') – poetry (1975)
- Den ensomme veranda ('The Lonely Veranda') – poetry (1977)
- Tenk på noe annet ('Think About Something Else') – poetry (1979)
- Liv laga – poetry (1982)
- Nattåpent ('Night Watch') – poetry (1985)
- Alle mine dikt ('All My Poems') – poetry (1990)
- En liten kvast med tusenfryd og fire rare løk: ukjente dikt og tekster 1925-1993 – poetry (1996)
- Samlede dikt ('Collected Poems') – collected works (1999)
- Breathing Exercise: Poems of Rolf Jacobsen (White Pine Press, 1985) (translated by Olav Grinde, Edited by Dennis Maloney)
- The Roads Have Come to an End Now (Copper Canyon Press, 2001) (translated by Robert Bly, Roger Greenwald and Robert Hedin)
- North in the World: Selected Poems of Rolf Jacobsen (University of Chicago Press, 2002) (translated and edited by Roger Greenwald)

== Awards ==
In the course of his long career, Jacobsen received many honors, among them membership in the Norwegian Academy for Language and Literature, the Norwegian Critics Prize for Literature (1960), the Doubloug Prize (1968), the Aschehoug Prize (1986) and the Swedish Academy Nordic Prize ("little Nobel") in 1989.

- Schæffers legat, 1934
- Henrichsens legat, 1936
- Norwegian Critics Prize for Literature (Kritikerprisen), 1960 for Brev til lyset
- Riksmål Society Literature Prize (Riksmålsforbundets litteraturpris), 1965
- Dobloug Prize (Doblougprisen), 1968
- Sarpsborgprisen, 1969
- Glåmdalens kulturpris, 1969
- Ønskediktprisen (NRK), 1970
- Hedmarksprisen, 1977
- Aschehoug Prize (Aschehougprisen), 1986
- Hamarprisen, 1986
- Svenska Akademiens nordiske pris, 1989
- Æresmedlem av Hamar Natur og ungdom, 1989
- Æresmedlem av Hedmark Forfatterlag, 1989
- Hedmark fylkeskommunes kulturpris, 1990
- Æresmedlem av Naturvernforbundet Hedmark, 1992

== Other sources ==
- Aadland, Erling Forundring, Trofasthet: Poetisk tenkning i Rolf Jacobsens lyrikk (Gyldendal norsk forlag. 1996)
- Lillebo, Hanne Ord ma en omvei: En biografi om Rolf Jacobsen (Aschehoug. 1998)
- Røsbak, Ove Rolf Jacobsen: En dikter og hans skygge (Gyldendal - 1998)
