= Kristin Bølgen Bronebakk =

Norwegian civil servant

Kristin Bølgen Bronebakk (11 June 1950 – 8 March 2012) was a Norwegian civil servant.

She graduated with the cand.mag. degree from the University of Oslo in 1983 and with the Master of General Administration from the University of Maryland, College Park in 1993. She worked as a clerk for the National Institute for Consumer Research from 1974 to 1976 and 1982 to 1985, and worked in the Ministry of Justice and the Police since 1985. She served as a deputy under-secretary of state until retiring in 2009. She then became a PhD student in criminology at the Faculty of Law, University of Oslo. She was also a board member of the International Corrections and Prisons Association since 2006.

She was married to ambassador Jørg Willy Bronebakk. She died in March 2012.
