= Håvard Kjærstad =

Norwegian businessperson (born 1947)

Håvard Kjærstad (born 1947) is a Norwegian businessperson.

He graduated from BI Norwegian Business School in 1972 with a degree in business economy. He was employed at Esso in 1970 and is currently Nordic Retail Sales Manager. He is also chairman of the board at the Norwegian Petroleum Institute.

Kjærstad has a fortune of $1.22 million. His net worth as of 2023 was $1 Million - $5 Million.
