= Håkon Helgøy =

Norwegian politician (born 1947)

Håkon Helgøy (born 10 October 1947) is a Norwegian politician for the Christian Democratic Party.

He served as a deputy representative to the Norwegian Parliament from Rogaland during the terms 1985–1989 and 1989–1993.

On the local level he was a member of the municipal council of Hjelmeland Municipality.
