= Kjell Mørk Karlsen =

Norwegian composer and organist

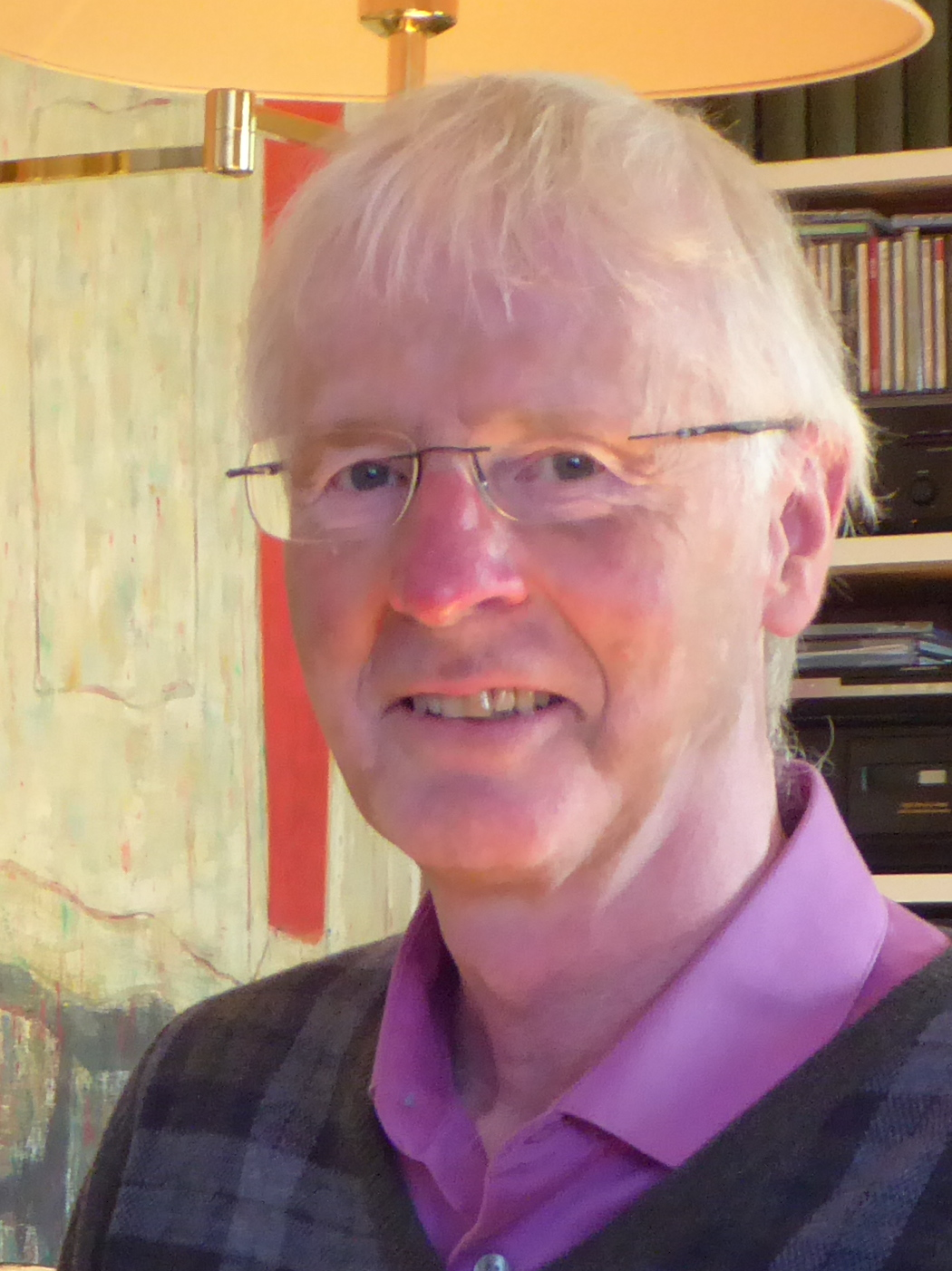
Kjell Mørk Karlsen 2016

Kjell Mørk Karlsen (born 31 March 1947) is a Norwegian composer and organist.

== Career ==
Mørk Karlsen was born in Oslo, and at first studied with his father, the composer and organ player Rolf Karlsen. Mørk Karlsen later enrolled at the Oslo Music Conservatory and graduated in 1968.

Throughout his career, Mørk Karlsen has focused on medieval, renaissance and baroque music which led him to founding the Oslo Pro Music Antiqua ensemble and leading it until 1974. He has also maintained close ties to the Musica Sacra movement, which has as its aim to renew interest in liturgy and early church music. Mørk Karlsen was also active as an organist throughout his professional career, retiring from the post as Asker Church organist in 2011.

Karlsen´s early works are characterised by an ecclesiastical liturgical-musical traditional rooting, while later works display an evolving tonal spectrum and a gradual introduction of dissonance, bringing the composer closer to contemporary styles while retaining traditional musical elements. Following a pivotal year of studies in 1983-84 with Finnish composer Joonas Kokkonen, Mørk Karlsen emerges as a symphonic composer, having penned a number of symphonies and oratories. Mørk Karlsen´s sonatas and string quartets are also cornerstones of his compositional output, displaying the composers predilection for classical chamber music formats.

Mørk Karlsen´s list of works also includes a considerable output of church music compositions for choirs, soloists, instruments and organ, including the collection Laudate Dominum which encompasses 100 choir motets written for each Sunday of the church year. Mørk Karlsen has also focused on renewing the larger format church music with such works as the symphonic oratory Lilja (1987), Johannespasjonen (1991), Sinfonia da Requiem (1995) and St.Hallvards litani (2000).

== Production ==
=== Selected works ===
- Magnificat noni toni, opus 14
- Jeremias' klagesanger, opus 25
- Konsert for orgel og symfonisk janitsjar, opus 28
- Symfoni for stort orkester, opus 70
- Laudate Dominum
- Konsert for fiolin og orkester, op. 135
- Kristusmeditasjoner, op. 121
- Lilja – symfonisk oratorium (1987)
- Johannespasjonen, opus 100 (1991)
- Sinfonia da Requiem (symfoni nr. 2) (1995)
- Missa nova, opus 104
- St. Hallvards litani, opus 130 (2000)
- Lukaspasjonen (2007)
- Da pacem - For mixed choir, Op. 189 (2017)
- EchoSonata - Trumpet, trombone and piano, op. 187b (2017)
- Symfoni nr. 12. (2017)

=== Discography ===
- James D. Hicks, Nordic Journey Volume VII (2018)
- James D. Hicks, Nordic Journey Volume V (2015)
- James D. Hicks, Nordic Journey Volume IV (2014)
- Inger-Lise Ulsrud, Frida Fredrikke Waaler Wærvågen, Kjell Mørk Karlsen: Meditatio (2014)
- Bergen Domkantori, St. Luke Passion (2011)
- Lise Strandli Pedersen, Norwegian music for solo violin (2010)
- Stig Nilsson, Solo + (2008)
- Bergen Domkantori, Jubilate Deo (2007)
- Minsk Kammerorkester, Karlsen - 'Violin Concerto (2006)
- Sølvguttene, Missa in Nativitate Domini : Julemesse (2006)
- Oslo Domkirkes Guttekor, Jubilate Deo (2005)
- Oslo Domkor, Kjell Mørk Karlsen: Stabat Mater dolorosa (2004)
- Olavskoret, Pie Jesu (2003)
- Stein Røe, Frygdesong (2002)
- Halgeir Schiager, Kjell Mørk Karlsen - Vision (2000)
- Vertavo String Quartet, Dolente (2000)
- Sondre Bratland, Kvilestein (1999)
- Johannespasjonen (1999)
- Sølvguttene, Kormusikk fra Norge I Middelalder og Renessanse, Samt fra Vår Tid (1997)
- Brynjar Hoff, The Contemporary Oboe (1996)
- Sølvguttene - I Westminster Abbey (1996)
- Harry Kvebæk, Årringer (1996)
- Bergen Domkantori, Julekvad (1992)
- Den Norske Strykekvartett, Karlsen• Nordensten • Mostad (1991)
- Kåre Nordstoga, Norwegian Organ Music (1990)
- Kolbotn Ungdomkorps, Contemporary Music for Symphonic Band (1987)
