= 1947 Norwegian local elections =

Local elections were held in Norway, with the exception of six municipalities, on October 20, 1947.

== Result of municipal elections ==
Results of the 1947 municipal elections.

| Party | Votes | % | Seats |
|---|---|---|---|
| Labour Party | 550,222 | 38.38 | 5,458 |
| Borgerlige felleslister | 117,209 | 8.18 | 1,938 |
| Upolitiske, lokale og andre lister | 102,364 | 7.14 | 1,928 |
| Liberal Party-Radical People's Party | 135,912 | 9.48 | 1,333 |
| Farmers' Party | 76,733 | 5.35 | 1,099 |
| Christian Democratic Party | 106,846 | 7.45 | 886 |
| Communist Party | 144,586 | 10.09 | 838 |
| Conservative Party | 199,667 | 13.93 | 807 |
| Småbrukere, arbeidere og fiskere | 0 | 0.00 | 143 |
| Total | 1,433,539 | 100.00 | 14,430 |
| Registered voters/turnout | 2,087,109 | – | |
Source: Élections en 1947 pour les conseils communaux et municipaux

=== National daily newspapers ===
| Newspaper | Party endorsed | Notes |
|---|---|---|
| Aftenposten | Conservative Party | |
