= Liv Jessen =

Liv Jessen (born 21 September 1947) is a Norwegian social worker, and former head of ProSenteret in Oslo—an organization that deals with issues related to prostitution.

Jessen was born in Sandefjord. In 2004 she was awarded Amnesty International Norway's Human Rights prize, in 2007 she received the Equality Award from the Confederation of Vocational Unions (YS) and in 2013 the King's Medal of Merit (Kongens fortjenstmedalje).

== ProSenteret ==
She led ProSenteret from 1984 until the end of February 2014. (The center is run by both the national government and the municipal government—statlig/kommunal.)

In 2001, the center's supervised injection site was closed, after TV2 had reported about its operating for two months, unlawfully. She has said that the publicity around this, later contributed to such injection sites becoming legal in Norway.

Since March 2014 she is not a formal employee of the center, but she will retain her office space until the end of the year, for the purpose of writing until she at the end of the year becomes a retiree.
