= An-Magritt Jensen =

An-Magritt Jensen (born 1947) is a Norwegian sociologist. Since 1997, she is Professor of Sociology at the Norwegian University of Science and Technology (NTNU). She holds a cand.polit. degree from 1975 and a dr.polit. degree from 1996. Her research fields are family changes, fertility and sociology of childhood. She has been vice chair of the Norwegian Sociological Association and a board member at NTNU. She is a member of the Royal Norwegian Society of Sciences and Letters.

== Publications ==
- BARNDOM - forvandling uten forhandling. Samboerskap, foreldreskap og søskenskap, 2008
- Children's Welfare in Ageing Europe (2004)
- Samboerskap som foreldreskap, 1999
- Samboerskap og foreldrebrudd etter 1970, 1997
- Samvær og fravær. Foreldres kontakt med barn de ikke bor sammen med, 1997
