= Olaf Almenningen =

Norwegian linguist and lexicographer (1947–2025)

- Born: 29 January 1947; Voss Municipality, Norway
- Died: 11 June 2025 (aged 78)
- Education: University of Bergen; University of Oslo
- Occupations: Linguist; Lexicographer

Olaf Almenningen (29 January 1947 – 11 June 2025) was a Norwegian linguist and lexicographer.

== Life and career ==
Almenningen was born in Voss Municipality on 29 January 1947. He finished his secondary education at the Voss Landsgymnas in 1966, studied at the University of Bergen, and later at the University of Oslo, graduating as cand. philol. in 1982.

Having been deputy leader of Norsk Målungdom from 1972 to 1973, he was the secretary of Noregs Mållag from 1976 to 1987. From 1987 to 2016 he was chief editor for the Nynorsk dictionary Norsk Ordbok. He was appointed professor in Nordic at the University of Oslo in 2008.

He chaired the sports club IL i BUL from 1997 to 1999. Almenningen died on 11 June 2025, at the age of 78.
