= Hans M. Barstad =

Norwegian theologian (1947–2020)

Hans Magnus Barstad (7 June 1947 – 26 August 2020) was a Norwegian theologian.

He was born in Åsnes, and took the dr. theol. degree in 1982 on the thesis The Religious Polemics of Amos. Studies in the Preaching of Amos, which was published in 1984. From 1986 he was a professor of theology at the University of Oslo, specializing in Old Testament prophets.

Barstad was a fellow of the Norwegian Academy of Science and Letters and from 1998 to 2000 its secretary-general. He was also chairman of the board of the University Library of Oslo from 1988 to 1992 and the Norwegian Old Testament Society from 1992 to 1994.

He died in August 2020, aged 73, in Alicante.
