= Svein Aage Christoffersen =

Norwegian theologian (born 1947)

Svein Aage Christoffersen (born 27 April 1947) is a Norwegian theologian.

Born in Oslo, he took his cand.theol. degree in 1973 and the dr.theol. degree in 1982, with a thesis on Gerhard Ebeling. He edited the journal Norsk Teologisk Tidsskrift from 1982 to 1993 and also became a professor of systematic theology at the University of Oslo in 1982. From 1984 to 1989, he served as dean of the Faculty of Theology. He is a member of the Norwegian Academy of Science and Letters.
