= National Institute of Technology (Norway) =

The National Institute of Technology (Norwegian: Statens teknologiske institutt; STI) was a Norwegian government agency and research institute that existed from 1917 to 1988, and that was active in technological research and innovation. It was established by the Storting (Parliament) on 6 May 1916, aimed at helping smaller industry and enterprises, and was headquartered in Oslo. In 1988 the government agency was dissolved and its activities were partially transferred to a private foundation, Teknologisk Institutt (TI). The foundation became a limited company in 2002, and was sold to Kiwa NV in 2015. The institute had around 250 employees.

It should not be confused with the Norwegian Institute of Technology.
