= Erling Lars Dale =

Norwegian educationalist

Erling Lars Dale (12 March 1947 – 25 September 2011) was a Norwegian educationalist.

He took his doctor's degree in 1987, and was an associate professor at the University of Oslo. He was hired as professor in 1993.

== Selected bibliography ==
This is a list of his most notable works:

- Pedagogikk og samfunnsforandring (1972)
- De strategiske pedagoger: pedagogikkens vitenskapshistorie i Norge (1999)
- Rom for alle - blikk for den enkelte (2004)
- Vurdering og læring i en elevaktiv skole (2006)
