= Harald Stabell =

Norwegian barrister

Harald Stabell (16 January 1947 – 15 December 2018) was a Norwegian barrister.

He worked as a defender in Eidsivating Court of Appeal from 1990 to 1995 and in Borgarting Court of Appeal and Oslo City Court from 1995. Since 2005 he was a barrister with access to Supreme Court cases.

He lived in Oslo, and was a ticket candidate for the communist political party Red.
