= Svein Erik Bakke =

Norwegian businessman

Svein Erik Bakke (11 June 1947 – 21 November 2006) was a Norwegian entrepreneur.

Bakke was born in Sørum Municipality in Romerike, Norway. He began building his fortune by cleaning as a seventeen-year-old. Earning the nickname Vaske-Bakke (Washing-Bakke), he went on to found the cleaning and laundry company Viking-gruppen (The Viking Group), which reached a total of 750 employees. After suffering a nervous breakdown, leading to a suicide attempt on 23 December 2001, Bakke sold his company. Later he put his fortune into property development in Trysil Municipality as a winter sports venue. He was also working with developing tourist resorts in Brazil.

Bakke was found dead in his apartment in Oslo on Tuesday, 21 November 2006 having taken his own life. Bakke who was divorced left his fiancée, Kajsa Lundgaard. His two children from a former marriage, Siv Rivenes Bakke and Ulf Bakke, inherited his business interests.
