= Ruth Bakke =

Norwegian organist and composer

Ruth Bakke (born 2 August 1947) is a Norwegian organist and composer. She was born in Bergen, Norway, and studied at the Bergen Music Conservatory and the University of Oslo. She continued her studies on a Fulbright grant at Converse College in South Carolina, Texas Lutheran College, University of Redlands in California, and Washington State University.

After completing her studies, Bakke returned to Norway where she worked in Bergen as an organist and choir conductor, and also taught music theory at the Bergen Music Conservatory and Bergen Teacher's Training College.

== Works ==
Bakke composes for orchestra, band, chamber, sacred, organ, vocal and multimedia works. Selected works include: "Organ sonata", 1970 "Rumus" for chamber orchestra, 1976 "Illuminations", bassoon concerto, 1994 "Tubazzo", tuba concerto, 1998 "Chromocumul" for symphony orchestra, 1972 "Dolorosa", electronic, 1998 "Body & Soul" for percussion and live electronics, 2000 "Into the Light" for violin and organ, 1982 "TrollSuite" for string quartet, 1981 "Meditation" for horn and organ, 1986 "Nonsense" for solo voice, 1990 "Sphaerae" for organ, 1992 "Suite ACD" for Renaissance instruments", 1992 "Psalm 20002" for organ and tuba, 1993 "Songs of the Sea" (a symphony for brass band), 1988 "Lone Star Memories" for symphony orchestra, 2000 "Ragadòn" for brass band, 2007 "Songs of the Seasons" violin concerto, 2007 "Dies Irae" for organ, 2009 "Agnus Dei" for voice, saxophone, keyboards, 2015 "en smule nattmusikk" (a little night music) 4 movements for Sop, sax, d.bass, perc, prep.piano, electronics, 2018
