= Johan Elsness =

Norwegian linguist and politician (born 1947)

Johan Elsness (born 27 February 1947) is a Norwegian linguist and politician for the Conservative Party.

Elsness is a professor of English language at the University of Oslo, Norway. He issued the book The perfect and the preterite in contemporary and earlier English on De Gruyter Mouton in 1997.

He served as a deputy representative to the Parliament of Norway from Østfold during the term 1989–1993. In total he met during 68 days of parliamentary session. He resides in Halden, where he has been active in the Roman Catholic community.
