= Svein Rennemo =

Norwegian businessman

- Born: 24 July 1947 (age 78); Drammen, Norway
- Occupations: Retired Businessman, former chair of statoil

Svein Rennemo (born 24 July 1947) is a Norwegian businessperson and former chair of Statoil.

== Career ==
Rennemo grew up in Drammen. He was educated in economics, graduating with the cand.oecon. degree from the University of Oslo in 1971. He then work as an adviser for the Norwegian Ministry of Finance, Norges Bank and later the Organisation for Economic Co-operation and Development. He was also a member of the Workers' Communist Party during his younger days, but exited that movement in 1975 when party executives called for self-proletarianization.

He worked for Statoil from 1982 to 1994, including holding executive offices within finance and the petrochemical division. In 1994 he was appointed chief financial officer, and in 1997 chief executive officer of Borealis. He left Borealis in 2001, and worked briefly for the consultant company Econ. In 2002 has hired by Jens Ulltveit-Moe as chief executive officer of Petroleum Geo-Services, a position he held until 1 April 2008 when he replaced Marit Arnstad as chairman of StatoilHydro. Eivind Reiten was the original choice as new chairman, but he left in late 2007 after only four days. StatoilHydro later reverted to its former name, Statoil.

Rennemo was previously a short-time board member of Kværner, from May to November 2001. He has also been chairman in Statnett, Intopto, Pharmaq and Tomra Systems and a board member of Norsk Hydro. In June 2009 he was announced as the new deputy chairman of Norske Skog. Their chairman is Eivind Reiten.

His hobbies include jogging, skiing, cycling and kayaking. He resides in Oslo.

Business positions
Preceded by Grete Faremo	Chair of Statnett; 2004–2008	Succeeded by Bjarne Aamodt
Preceded by Marit Arnstad (acting)	Chair of Statoil	Incumbent
