= Astrid Bekkenes =

Norwegian politician (born 1947)

Astrid Bekkenes (born 5 July 1947) is a Norwegian politician for the Liberal Party.

She serves as a deputy representative to the Norwegian Parliament from Vest-Agder during the term 2005–2009. In total she met during 13 days of parliamentary session.
