= Øystein Rottem =

Norwegian literary historian

- Born: 1 February 1946; Hemnskjela, Norway
- Died: 5 December 2004 (aged 58); Copenhagen
- Occupations: Philologist, literary historian and literary critic.
- Employers: University of Tromsø; University of Copenhagen

Øystein Rottem (1 February 1946 – 5 December 2004) was a Norwegian philologist, literary historian and literary critic. He wrote works about Knut Hamsun and Sigurd Hoel, as well as three volumes of Norges Litteraturhistorie, covering Norwegian literary history after World War II.

== Personal life ==
Rottem was born on the island of Hemnskjela in what was then Heim Municipality. His parents were Sverre Bernhardsen Rottem and Solveig Terese Hassel. He was married to Gerd Synnøve Vigeland from 1969 to 1989, and to Bente Findling-Nielsen from 1991. He died from cancer in Copenhagen on 5 December 2004.

== Career ==
Rottem graduated from the University of Oslo in 1976 with the cand.philol. degree. He was a literary critic for the newspaper Dagbladet from 1984, and is regarded among the most important and influential literary critics in Norway over a period of two decades. Before Dagbladet he had worked for Ny Tid and Arbeiderbladet. He also contributed to Norsk biografisk leksikon.

His most widespread works as a literary historian are the three last volumes of Norges Litteraturhistorie, covering the period after World War II, Fra Brekke til Mehren 1945–1965 (volume 6, published 1995), Inn i medietidsalderen 1965–1980 (volume 7, 1997) and Vår egen tid 1980–1998 (volume 8, 1998). He lectured at the University of Tromsø and from 1985 to 1991 at the University of Copenhagen, and spent one year from 1991 to 1992 as a visiting scholar at the University of Vienna. He published several academic works about Knut Hamsun, and a biography of Sigurd Hoel (1991). His guide books on Copenhagen include Vårt København. Norske forfattere i Kongens by (2000), Sild & snaps i København (2003), and Til bords i Tivoli (2004).
