= Julli Wiborg =

Norwegian teacher and author (1880–1947)

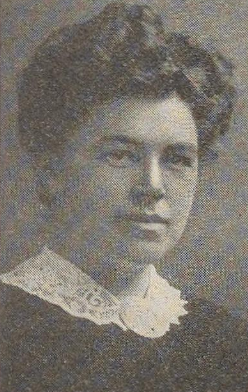
- Born: 11 March 1880; Ytre Holmedal Municipality, Norway
- Died: 25 August 1947 (aged 67); Oslo, Norway
- Occupations: Author, teacher
- Spouse: Nils Olaf Wiborg (m. 1907)
- Children: 3
- Parents: Nils Landmark; Elise Schram
- Relatives: Edle Solberg; Eva Marie Holthe (sisters)

Juliane Fredrikke "Julli" Wiborg (née Landmark; 11 March 1880 – 25 August 1947) was a Norwegian teacher and author. She published 34 books, mainly children's books and young girls' novels. Cappelen was her publisher.

== Family and background ==
Juliane Landmark was born in 1880 in Ytre Holmedal Municipality, Norway. Her father Nils Landmark (1844–1923) was the grandson of judge Nils Landmark, and worked as a skipper on the Norwegian Missionary Society's mission ship Elieser from 1872 to 1880, later working for the Norwegian customs agency. Her mother, Elise Schram, was a teacher. She had two sisters, Edle Solberg and Eva Marie Holthe.

She graduated from the teachers' school in Notodden in 1903, and worked as a teacher in Porsgrunn Municipality and Fet Municipality from 1903 until 1907. In 1907 she married fellow teacher Nils Olaf Wiborg, and they moved to Kristiania (now Oslo) in 1909. Together they had three children, Elisabeth, Ingrid and Randi. Wiborg died 25 August 1947 in Oslo.

== Literary work ==
Ragna by Julli Wiborg from 1914.

She was part of the new movement of authors who in the first half of the 1900s wrote books in Norwegian aimed at children and young people, similarly to Barbra Ring, Dikken Zwilgmeyer and Nora Thorstensen. Many of Wiborg's book are termed young girls' books, and several of her books were very popular, being published in three to seven editions.

In 1908 she published her first book, Smaafolk. Fortællinger for gutter og piker. Her true breakthrough came with the Kiss series and Ragna books.

Breaking free from family or societal expectations of who one should be is a consistent theme in several of Wiborg's books. While she was free-minded and questions established truths, her books also come from a moral/Christian basis and her characters always end up making the "right" choices.

In Wiborg's books, society is portrayed almost realistically – the girls who work hard to be independent are also students who have to work as domestic help on the side to make ends meet, and the reader sees businesses go bankrupt and travelers to America return disillusioned. Snobbery and class distinction are condemned, while hard work and honest motives are emphasized as good qualities.

When her books were first released, they received both hard criticism and glowing reviews. Critics felt that she wrote romantic books without any literary quality, that she had a very traditional view of women, or that her books were superficial and her use of language was poor. Other newspapers praised her books for their relevance, for quality of entertainment, or for a good moral message.

== Selected works ==
- Smaafolk. Fortællinger for gutter og piker (1908)
- Kiss og alle de andre (1909) – published by Lutherstiftelsen forlag
- Frøken Kiss (1910)
- Jan og Eva. Fortælling for gutter og piker (1911)
- Student Kiss (1911)
- For første gang (1913)
- Ragna. Fortælling for unge piker (1914)
- Forlovet (1915)
- Majen (1916)
- Mens hjertet længter (1917)
- Naar kjærligheten kommer (1918)
- Da eventyret kom (1919)
- Frieren (1920)
- Lykkebarnet (1920)
- En farlig drøm (1921)
- Tryllenøkkelen. Fortællinger (1922)
- Seilasen (1922)
- Frøken Tornerose (1924)
- De paa sytten (1925)
- Veien til mannens hjerte (1927)
- Unge øine (1928)
- Ut (1929)
- Gyngende grunn (1930)
- Kusinen fra landet (1931)
- April (1932)
- Mitt skib er lastet med - (1933)
- Tante Ovidia (1934)
- Når gjøken galer(1935) – cover illustrated by Harald Damsleth
- Hundre prosent kvinne (1937) – cover illustrated by Harald Damsleth
- Vi flytter hjemmefra (1938) – cover illustrated by Harald Damsleth
- Kari Hushjelp (1939)

== Translations ==
A number of her books were translated into Swedish. In Sweden as well, her books received tough criticism:

Even the authors of girls' books are often too productive. The Norwegian author Julli Wiborg, for example, has written a couple of quite good girls' books, but also a whole series of unnecessary ones to say the least, some of which contain tastelessness to which disapproving parents must react strongly. That these books, with their light-hearted film eroticism, have any role to play in introducing young people to these problems, as I have heard suggested in their defense, is pure nonsense. ... Her books are also exponents of the exasperating continuation narrative that flourishes among girls' books. One is thrown into a hopeless tangle of aunts, uncles, cousins, fiances, etc., about which one never learns anything unless one has read the five previous books in the series.

— by Lizzie Tynell, "Barnbokskataloger" in Biblioteksbladet (1933)

=== Swedish bibliography ===
- Kiss och alla de andra (1913)
- Fröken Kiss (1914) – translated by Louise af Klercker
- Studenten Kiss (1916)
- Lyckobarnet (1917)
- Karen Vangen längtar ut i världen (1922) – translated by Thea Hökerberg
- Karen Vangen ute på egen hand (1923) – translated by Thea Hökerberg
- Karen Vangens friare: flickroman (1924) – translated by Thea Hökerberg
- Ragna: berättelse för unga flickor (1925)
- Förlovad (1926)
- Majen: berättelse för unga flickor (1927)
- Ut (1930)
- Vägen till mannens hjärta (1933)
- April (1936)
- Vivi (1937) – translated by Dora Graaf
- Hundra procent kvinna (1938) – translated by Ragnhild Hallén, new edition 1956
- För första gången (1938)
- Inga förlovar sig (1941)
- Vi flyttar hemifrån (1947)

=== Danish bibliography ===
- Ud – Fortælling for unge Piger (1932) – translated by Esther Malling, published by Jespersen og Pios forlag
- Grethe (1939) – published by Jespersen og Pios forlag

=== Finnish bibliography ===
- Tyttö tahtoo maailmalle (1928)

=== German bibliography ===
Several of Wiborg's books were also translated to German and published by Deutchnordischer Verlag.

- In unbestimmtem Sehnen (1921)
- Erfüllung (1921)
- Wenn's Herze Spricht (1921)
