= Hans Brattestå =

Norwegian civil servant and jurist

Hans Brattestå (born 17 May 1947 in Ramnes) is a Norwegian civil servant and jurist.

Since 1990 he has been director of the Parliament of Norway. He worked for the foreign service from 1978 to 1984, and since then has been staff at parliament. He is also a board member of Lovdata.
