= Jørg Willy Bronebakk =

Norwegian diplomat (born 1947)

Jørg Willy Bronebakk (born 5 March 1947) is a Norwegian diplomat.

He is a cand.polit. by education, and started working for the Norwegian Ministry of Foreign Affairs in 1974. He served at the embassies in Saudi Arabia from 1976 to 1979, West Germany from 1979 to 1982 and the United States from 1989 to 1993, then the NATO delegation in Brussels from 1993 to 1996.

He then returned to the Ministry of Foreign Affairs in Norway; as head of department from 1996 to 1997, deputy under-secretary of state from 1997 to 2003 and assisting permanent under-secretary of state from 2003 to 2006. He served at the Norwegian ambassador to Denmark from 2007 to 2012 and ambassador to Finland from 2012.

He was married to Kristin Bølgen Bronebakk. He resides at Tanum.
