= Johan Vold =

Norwegian businessperson (born 1947)

Johan Nic. Vold (born 1947) is a Norwegian businessperson. He is Chairman of Gassnova and Deputy Chairman of DnB NOR. He is a Vice Chair of the Board of Trustees for Sofia University located in Palo Alto of California.

== Biography ==
Vold is educated as siviløkonom at the Norwegian School of Economics and Business Administration. He has worked as an executive in Statoil, and later CEO of Norsk Shell. He has also been Chairman of Econ Analyse, the Nordic Investment Bank, SINTEF, INTSOK and PETRAD.
