= Torje Olsen Solberg =

Norwegian politician

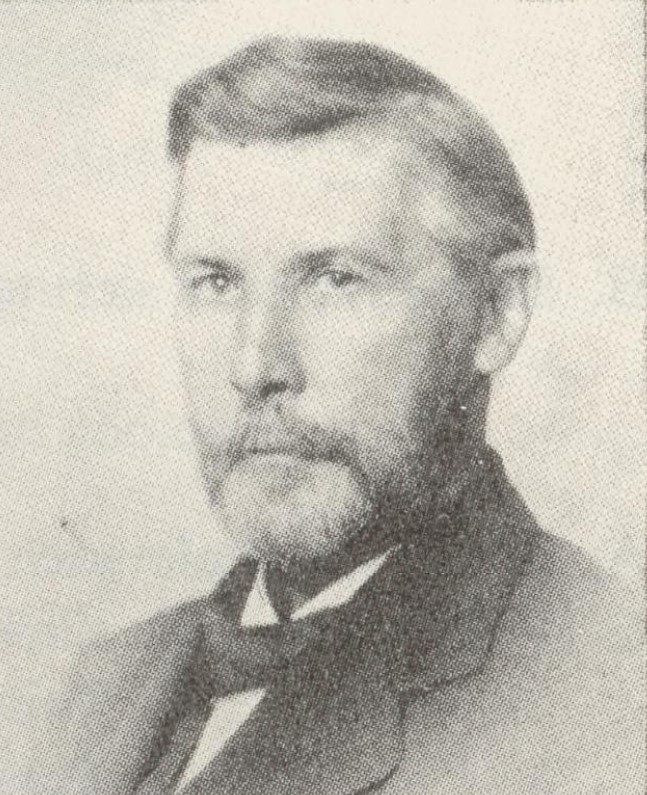
Torje Olsen Solberg

Torje Olsen Solberg (11 February 1856 – 1 October 1947) was a Norwegian politician for the Liberal Party.

He was born in Holt Municipality, and spent most of his life as a farmer. He was a member of the municipal council of Holt Municipality from 1896 to 1898 and 1904 to 1919, serving as deputy mayor from 1904 to 1910 and 1913 to 1916. He was a deputy representative to the Norwegian Parliament during the term 1916–1918.
