= Frank Stubb Micaelsen =

Norwegian writer (1947–2013)

- Born: 9 May 1947; Porsgrunn, Norway
- Died: 24 September 2013 (aged 66)
- Education: University of Trondheim
- Occupations: Poet and novelist

Frank Stubb Micaelsen (9 May 1947 – 24 September 2013) was a Norwegian schoolteacher, poet and novelist.

He was born in Porsgrunn to Johnny Micaelsen and Gerd Stubb Olsen. He graduated as a schoolteacher in 1975, and as cand.philol. from the University of Trondheim in 1986.

Micaelsen made his literary debut in 1975 with the poetry collection Kamerat Sirius, and followed up with Tante Ingas kaffekos in 1976. In these collections he typically describes trivial objects to which he attributes new and unexpected properties. The collections Sol. Diesel from 1981 and Fjernlysets krets (1983) explore the mixture of nature, machinery and urban objects. His novel Maifesten was published in 1982. The collections Amor med gevær from 1985 and Mannskoret fra Utopia from 1987 describe life from a masculine perspective, with elements such as fishing expeditions, boozing, hangovers, horniness and heartsickness.

He was awarded Hartvig Kirans minnepris in 1985.
