= Kjell Øvergård =

Norwegian politician (born 1947)

Kjell Øvergård (born 28 July 1947) is a Norwegian politician for the Labour Party.

He served as a deputy representative to the Norwegian Parliament from Akershus during the term 1997–2001.

On the local level Øvergård was the mayor of Enebakk from 1992 to 1993.
