= 1945 in Norway =

- Centuries: 18th; 19th; 20th; 21st
- Decades: 1920s; 1930s; 1940s; 1950s; 1960s
- See also: List of years in Norway

Events were happened in the year 1945 in Norway.

== Incumbents ==
- Government in Exile (in London) until 9 May
  - Monarch – Haakon VII.
  - Prime Minister – Johan Nygaardsvold (Labour Party) until 25 June, Einar Gerhardsen (Labour Party)
- German Military Governor
  - Reichskommissar in Norway – Josef Terboven until 7 May, Franz Böhme until 8 May
- German Puppet Government in Oslo
  - Minister-President – Vidkun Quisling (National Unification) until 8 May

== Events ==
- 8 February – Karl Marthinsen was assassinated.
- 9 February – 29 Norwegians were executed by the Nazi regime in Norway as reprisal of Marthinsen's death, among others Jon Vislie, Kaare Sundby and Haakon Sæthre. The extent and severity of the reprisals shocked the Norwegian population and government-in-exile, resulting in a general moratorium against targeted killings of high-ranking Nazi officials.
- 9 February – Black Friday: a large air battle between German and British aircraft over Sunnfjord. It was the largest aerial clash over Norway during World War II.
- 7 May – Knut Hamsun released his obituary of Adolf Hitler.
- 8 May – The occupation of Norway by Nazi Germany ended as German forces agreed to an unconditional surrender.
- 8 May – Grini concentration camp was liberated, only to be used later for treason suspects under the name Ilebu.
- 8 May – Josef Terboven and Wilhelm Rediess committed suicide.
- 9 May – Vidkun Quisling was arrested.
- 11 May – Sverre Riisnæs gave up his entrenchment at Skallum farm. Jonas Lie died during the entrenchment.
- 11 May – Akershus Fortress surrendered by the Germans to Terje Rollem acting on behalf of the resistance.
- 13 May – Heinrich Fehlis was arrested and committed suicide.
- 14 May – Henry Rinnan was arrested.
- 31 May – Government returned from exile in London.
- 6 June – King Haakon VII of Norway returned to Norway.
- 14 June – Knut Hamsun was apprehended.
- 20 June – Paal Berg gave up plans to form a broad, non-partisan coalition government.
- 23 June – The newspaper Verdens Gang was founded.
- 25 June – Prime Minister Johan Nygaardsvold resigned as Haakon VII appointed Einar Gerhardsen to head an interim government composed of all political parties.
- 6 July – Norway declares war on Japan.
- 25 July – Gerhardsen's First Cabinet was appointed.
- 17 August – Reidar Haaland was executed.
- 4 September – The Third Reich's last active troops surrender after seal hunters discover them on Bear Island.
- 8 October – The 1945 Parliamentary election takes place.
- 24 October – Vidkun Quisling was executed by firing squad at Akershus Fortress.
- 5 November – Gerhardsen's Second Cabinet was appointed.
- 19 November – Municipal and county elections are held throughout the country.
- 27 November – Norway joins the United Nations.
- December – The periodical Kvinnen og Tiden is founded.
- 24 December – Henry Rinnan escaped from prison, only to be apprehended later.
- Date unknown – IG Farben was the largest stock-holder in Norsk Hydro. The two companies first formed a business partnership in 1927.
- Date unknown – The Norwegian Mining Museum opened.
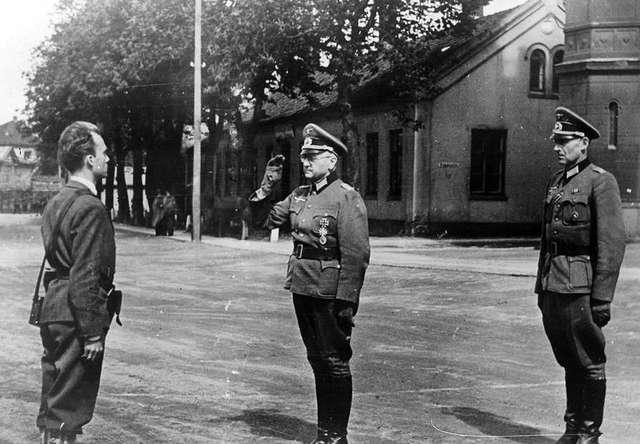
The German surrender of Akershus Fortress on 11 May 1945.

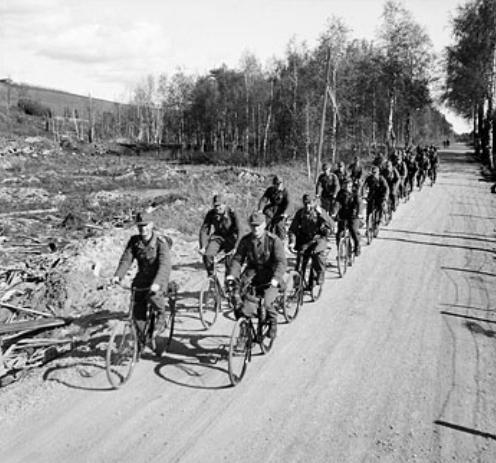
German troops leave Oslo on bicycles, 19 May 1945

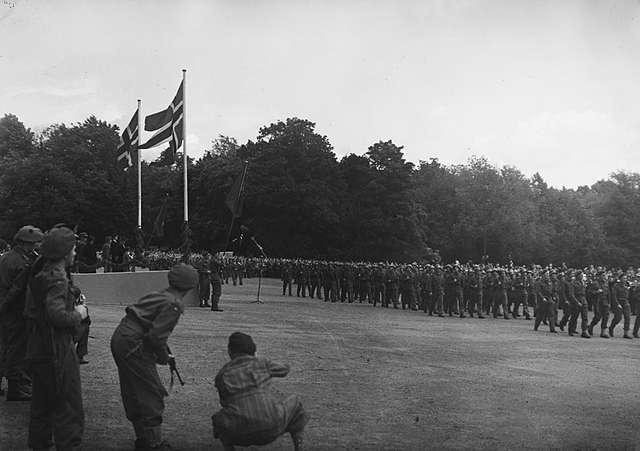
The Norwegian underground army of the Second World War on parade in front of the Royal Palace in 1945.

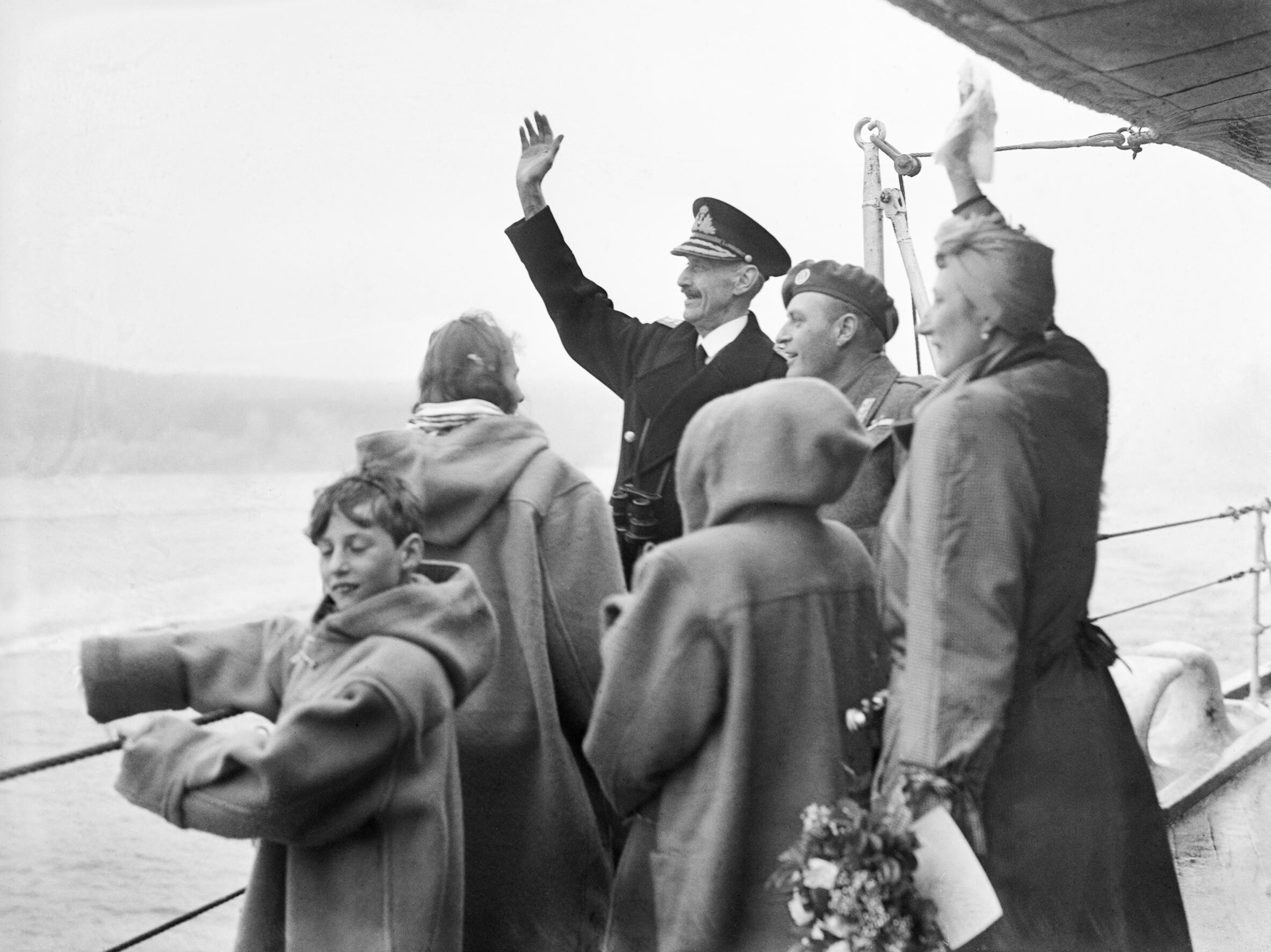
The Royal Family of Norway waving to the welcoming crowds from HMS Norfolk at Oslo, June 1945

== Notable births ==
=== January ===
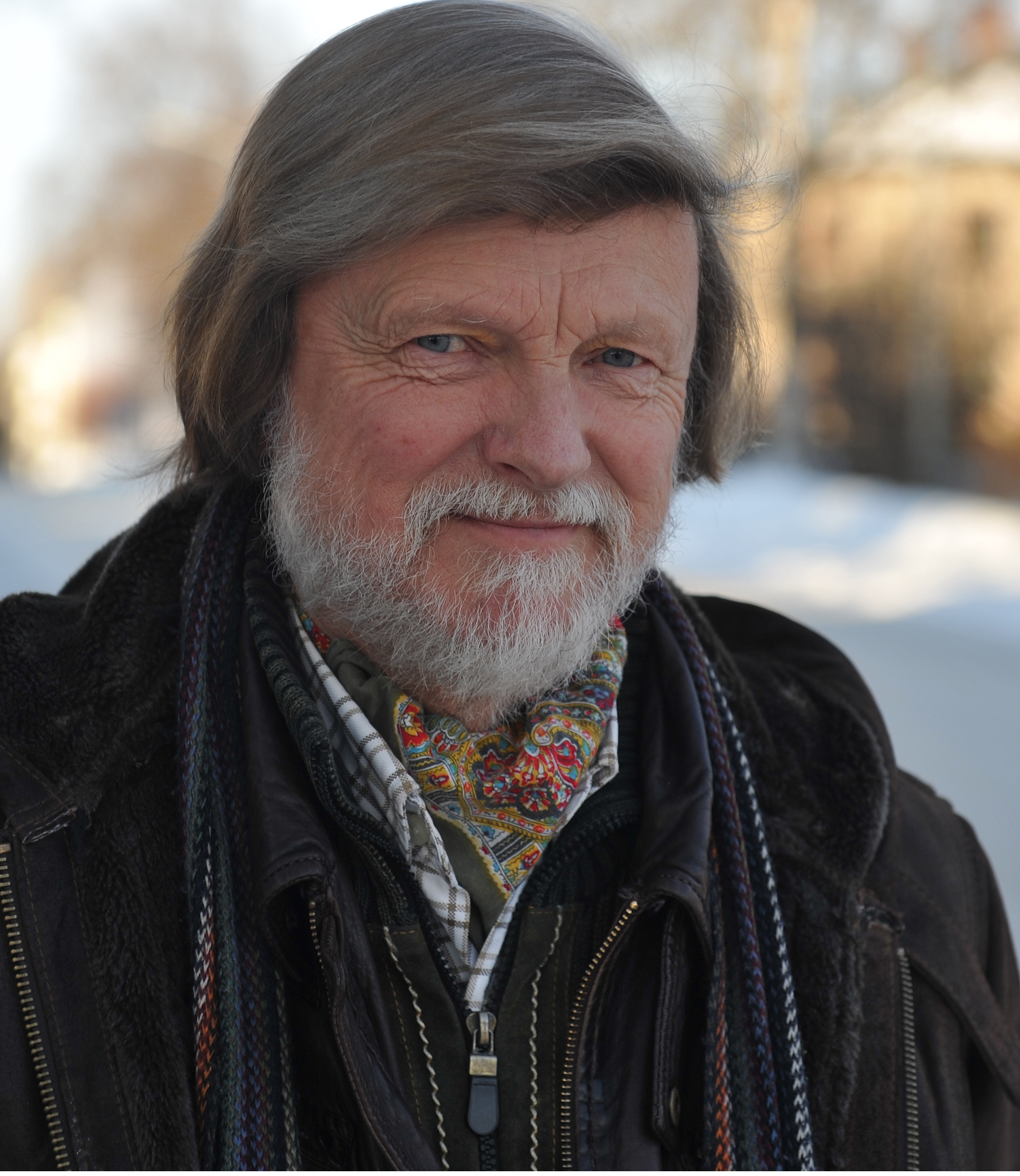
Terje Bjørklund

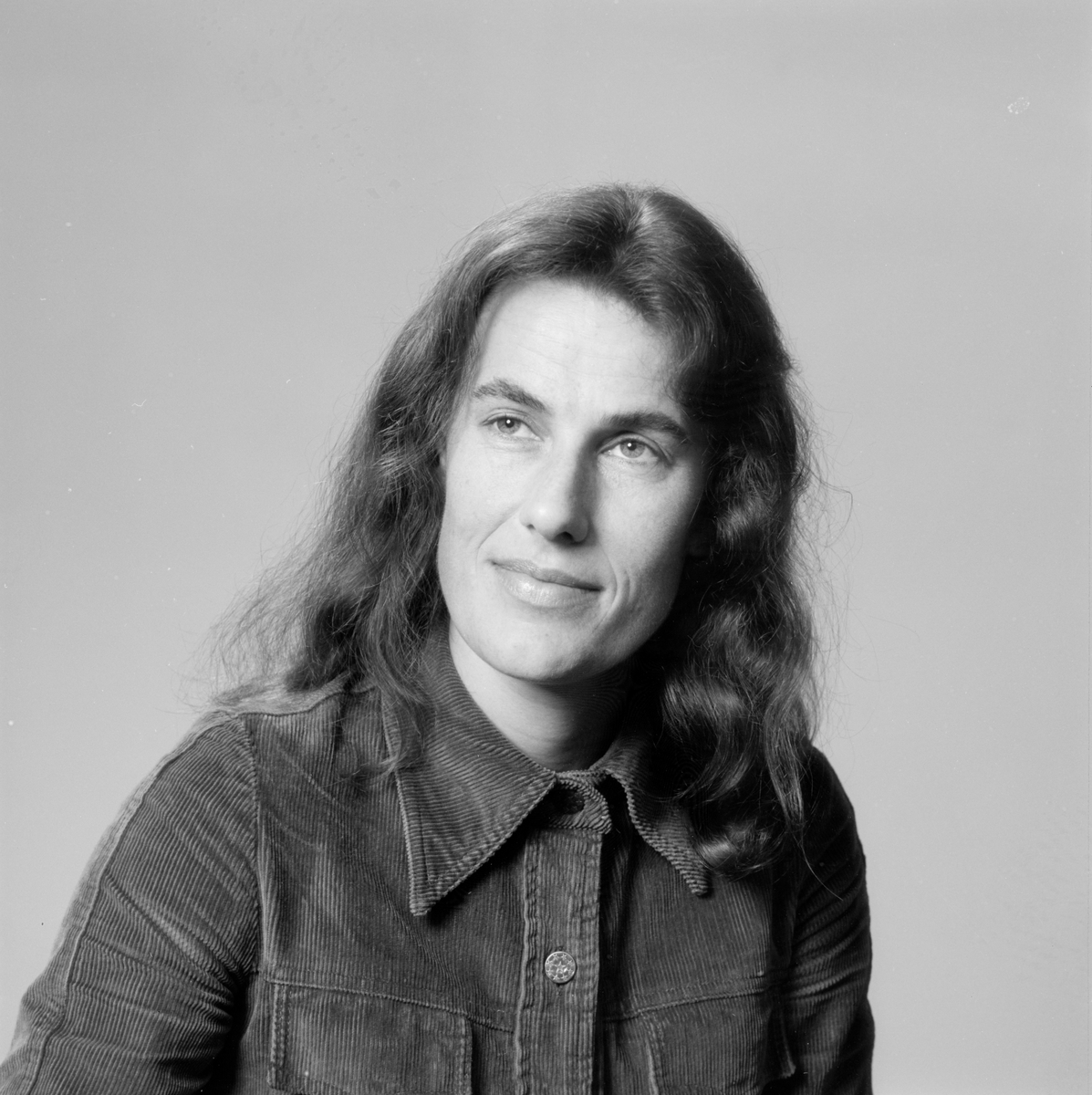
Liv Køltzow

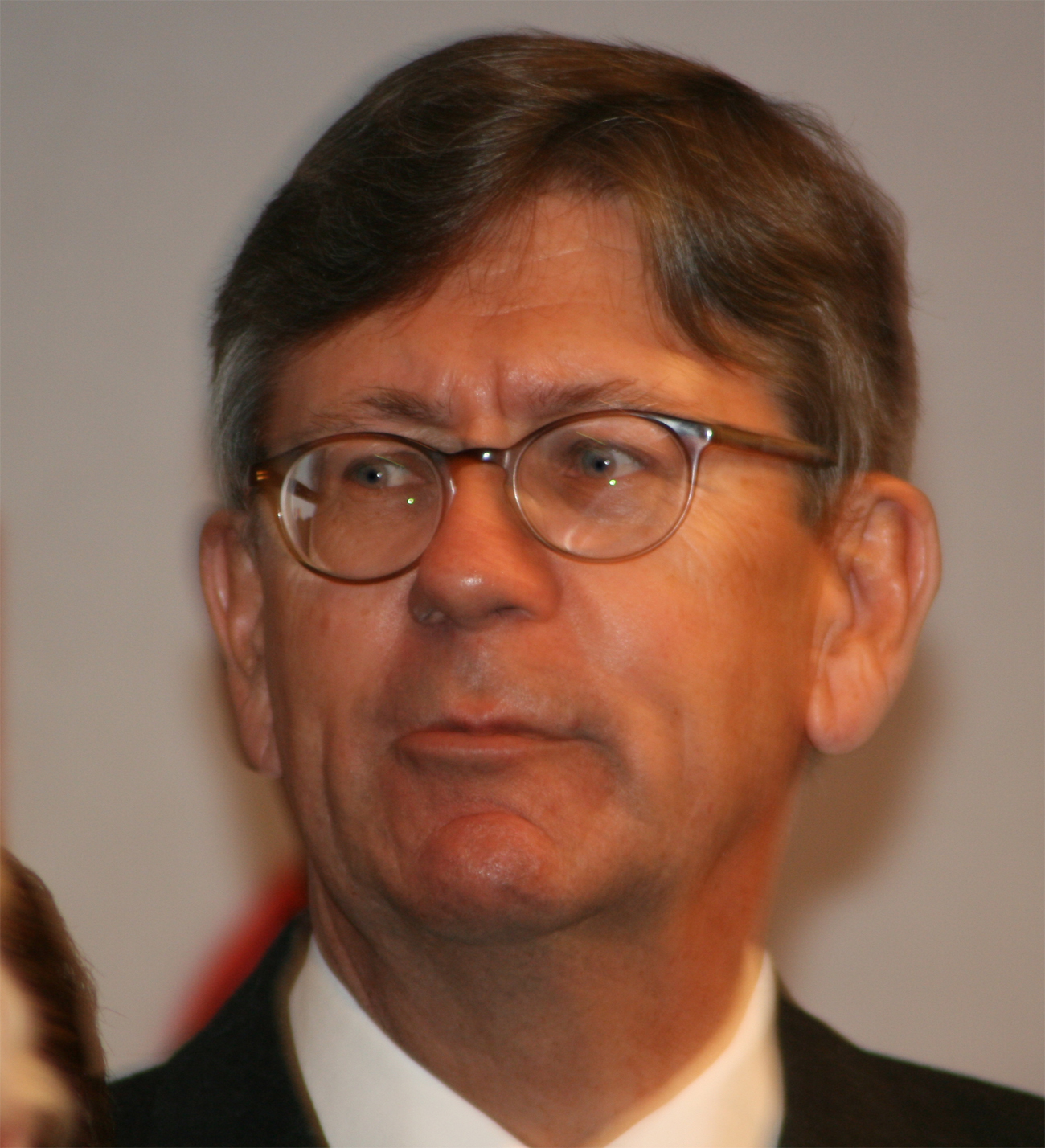
Bjørn Tore Godal

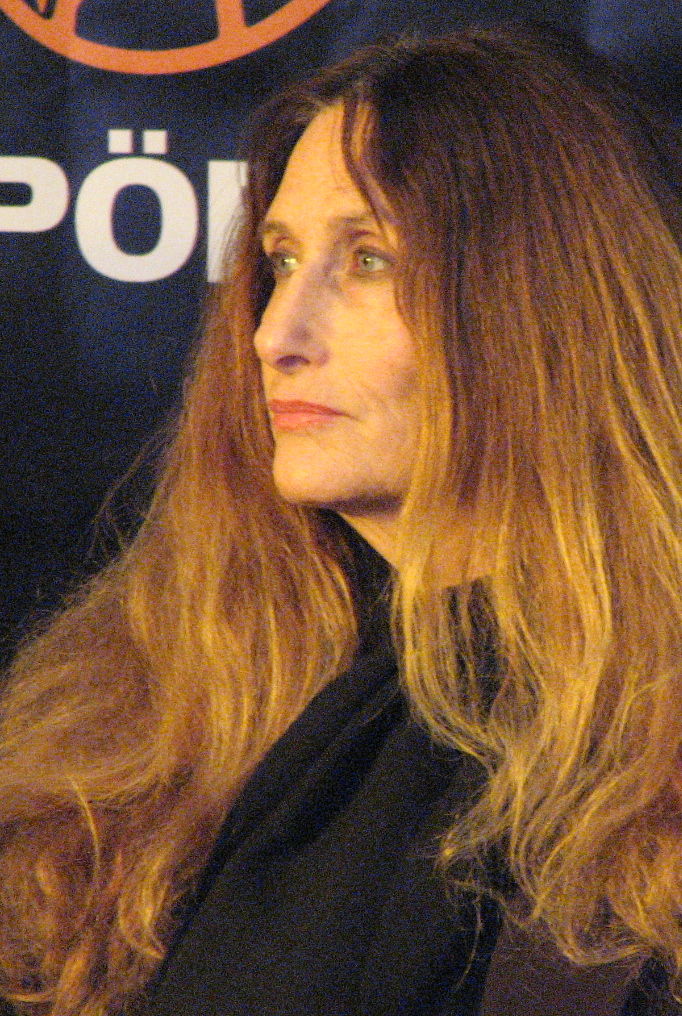
Vibeke Løkkeberg

- 1 January
  - Jan Mehlum, crime fiction writer and sociologist.
  - Martin Schanche, racing driver.
- 2 January
  - Terje Bjørklund, jazz pianist and composer.
  - Øyvind Myhre, author of science fiction and fantasy literature.
- 5 January
  - Trond Martiniussen, Olympic wrestler.
  - Peter Johan Schei, biologist and civil servant.
- 6 January – Morten Lund, politician.
- 9 January – Liv Gjølstad, judge.
- 10 January – Steinar Stjernø, academic.
- 11 January – Inger Prebensen, jurist and banker.
- 14 January
  - Liv Køltzow, novelist, playwright, biographer and essayist (died 2025).
  - Britt Langlie, stage actress and singer.
- 17 January – Geir Lundestad, historian.
- 18 January – Bjørn Rime, footballer.
- 20 January – Bjørn Tore Godal, politician and Minister.
- 22 January
  - Vibeke Løkkeberg, film director and actress.
  - Christopher Stensaker, politician (died 2018).
- 24 January – Hans Mehren, Olympic sailor.
- 28 January
  - Hallgrim Berg, folk musician and politician.
  - Berit Nesheim, film director.
- 30 January –
  - Elisabeth Haarr, textile artist (died 2025).
  - Britt Schultz, politician.

=== February ===
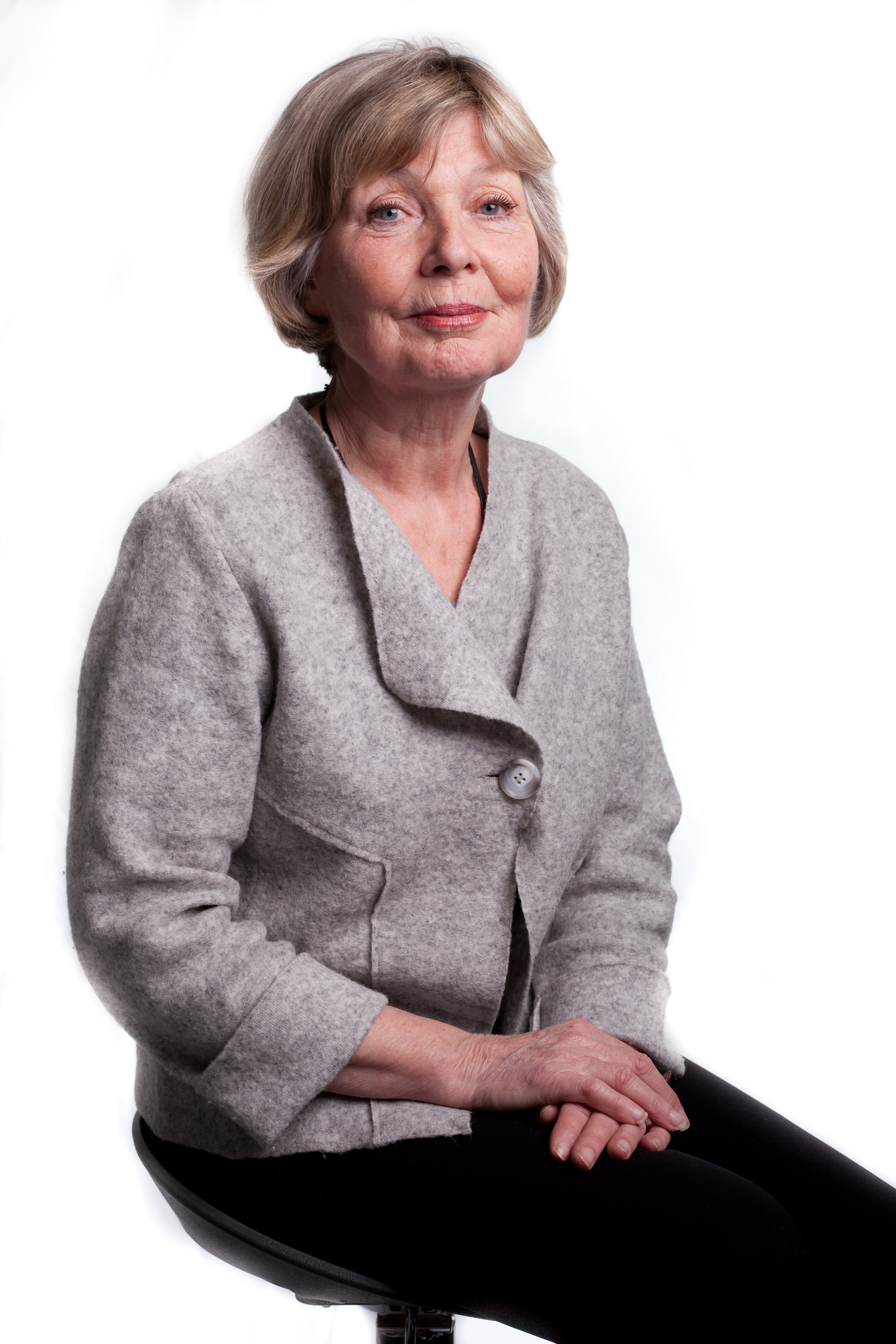
Bjørg Mikalsen

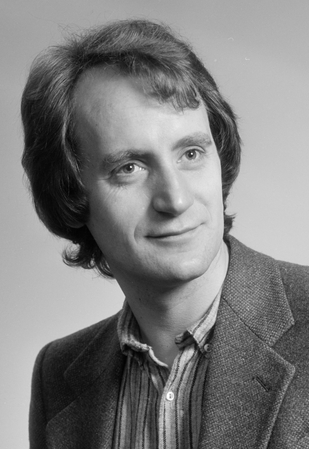
Rune Slagstad

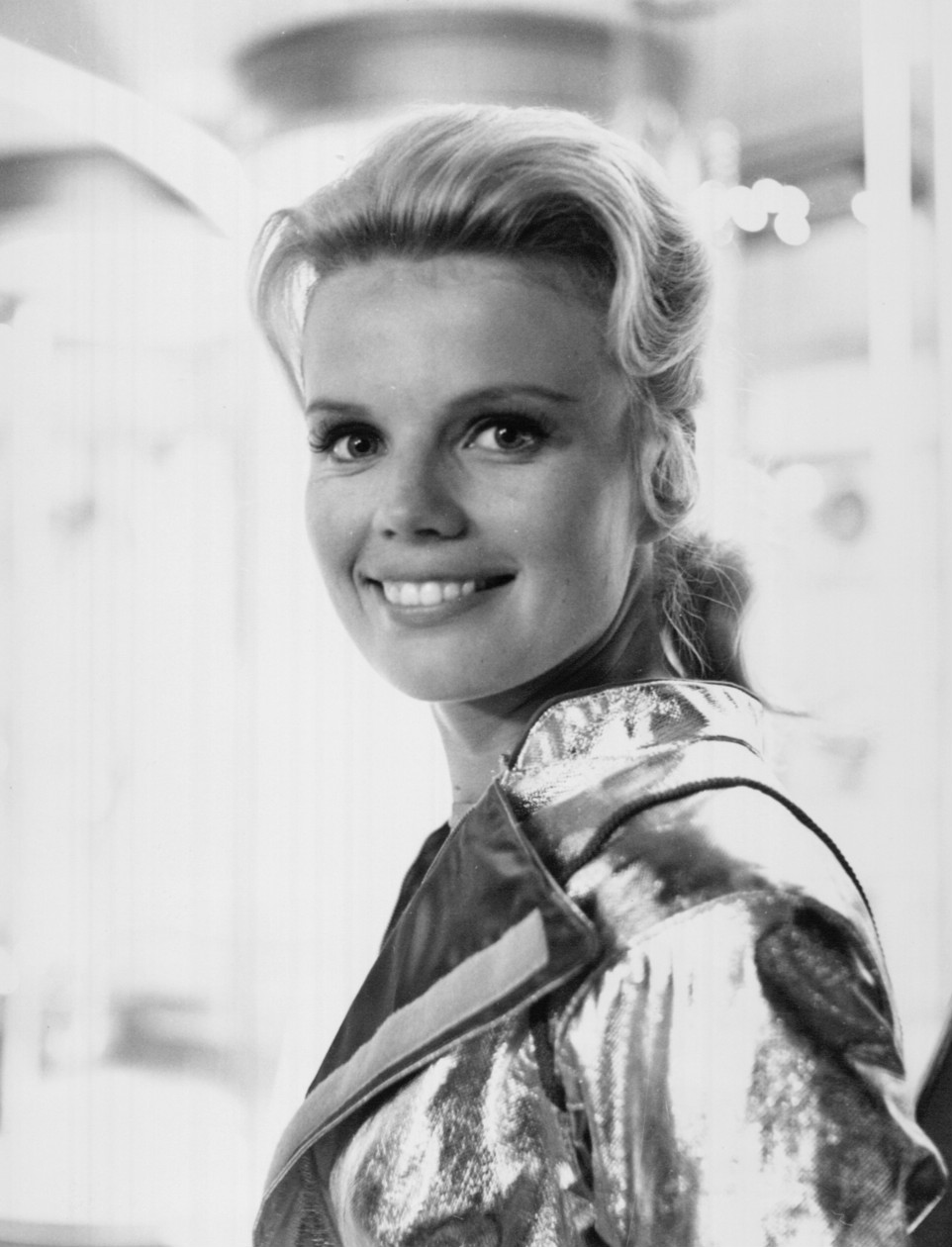
Marta Kristen

- 8 February
  - Gerd Inger De Groot, long track speed skater.
  - Bjørg Mikalsen, politician.
- 10 February – Espen Haavardsholm, novelist, poet, biographer and essayist.
- 14 February – Thorleif Andresen, Olympic cyclist. (died 2022)
- 17 February – Sølve Skagen, film director.
- 18 February – Hans Einar Krokan, physician and cancer researcher.
- 19 February – Jan Økseter, handball player.
- 22 February – Rune Slagstad, historian, philosopher, legal theorist, and journal editor.
- 23 February – Øystein Rian, historian.
- 26 February – Marta Kristen, actress
- 27 February – Odd Fossengen, motorcycle speedway rider (died 2017)

=== March ===
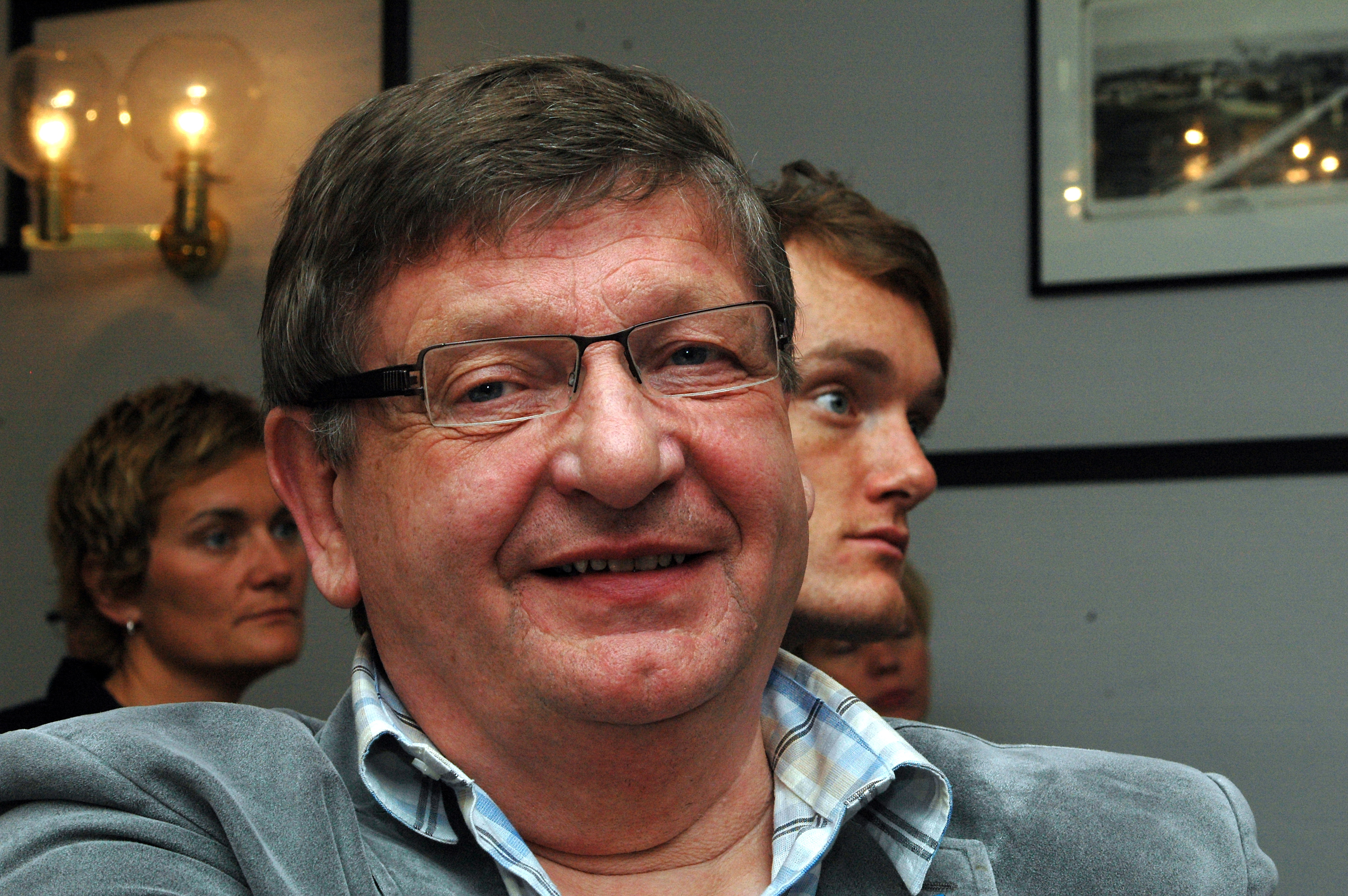
Einar Strøm

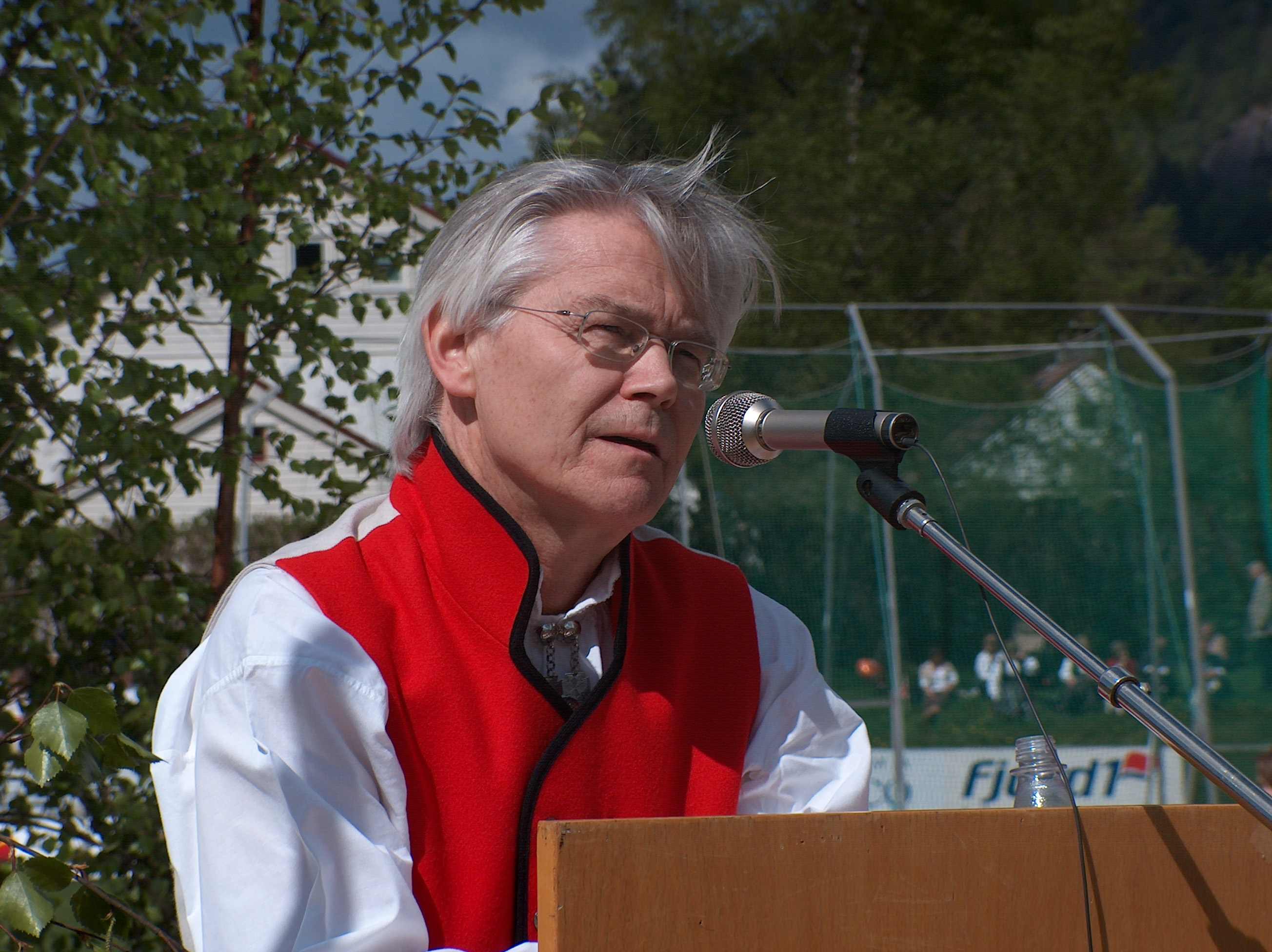
Sylfest Lomheim

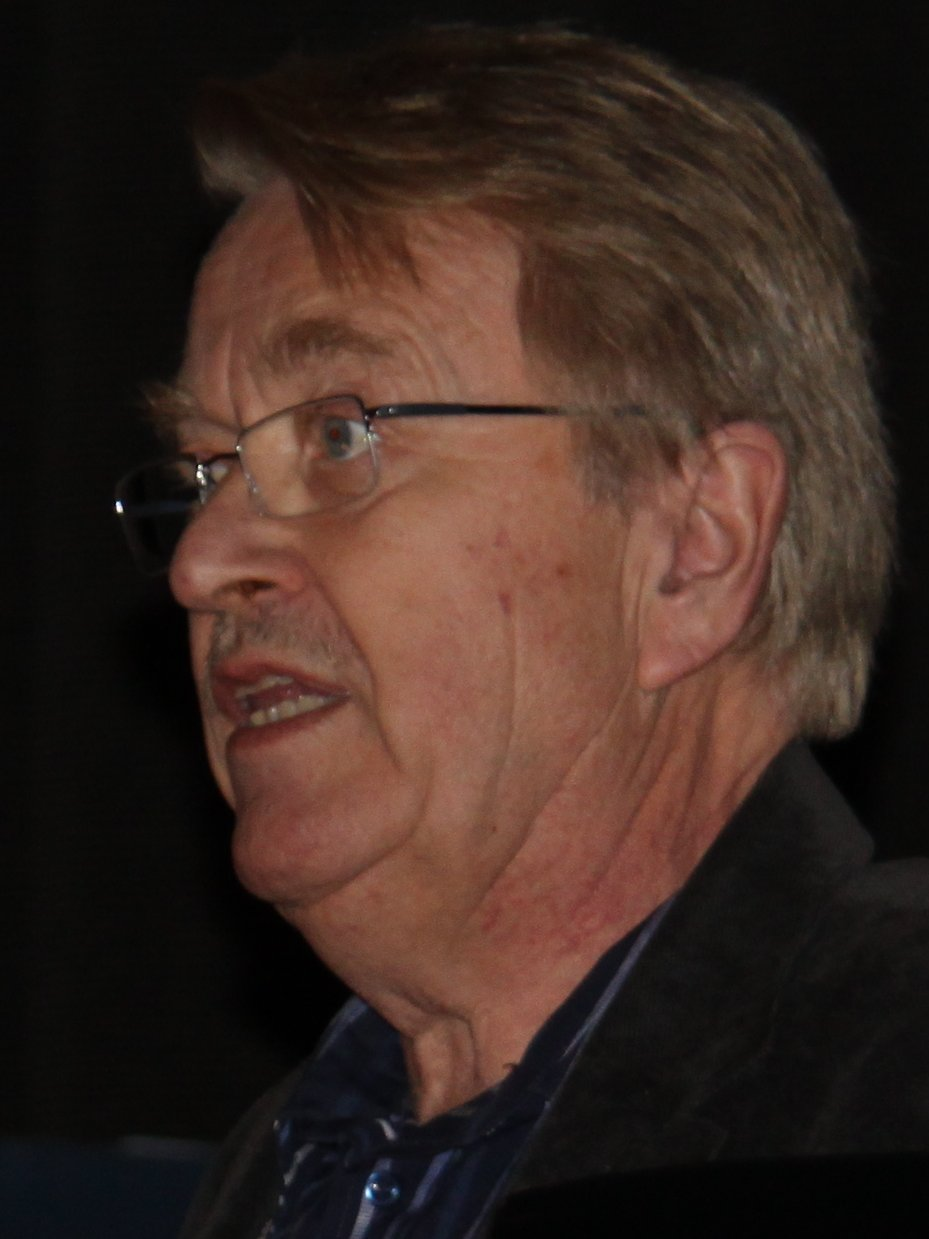
Terje Ottar

- 2 March – Einar Strøm, politician.
- 5 March – Rune Johan Andersson, cartoonist, illustrator and children's writer.
- 7 March – Audun Tron, politician.
- 11 March – Sylfest Lomheim, philologist and director of the Norwegian Language Council, Språkrådet
- 12 March – Sven Ole Fagernæs, jurist and civil servant.
- 14 March
  - Rolf Trolle Andersen, diplomat.
  - Sigvald Tveit, composer and musicologist (died 2019).
- 16 March – Ingebjørg Støfring, diplomat.
- 18 March – Terje Ottar, politician.
- 19 March
  - Hilde Mæhlum, sculptor.
  - Bjørn Moe, orchestra conductor and associate professor at the Norwegian University of Science and Technology
- 20 March – Erling Brandsnes, politician
- 26 March – Steinar Bastesen, politician.
- 27 March – Rolf M. Aagaard, photographer.
- 29 March – Ann-Kristin Olsen, jurist and civil servant.

=== April ===
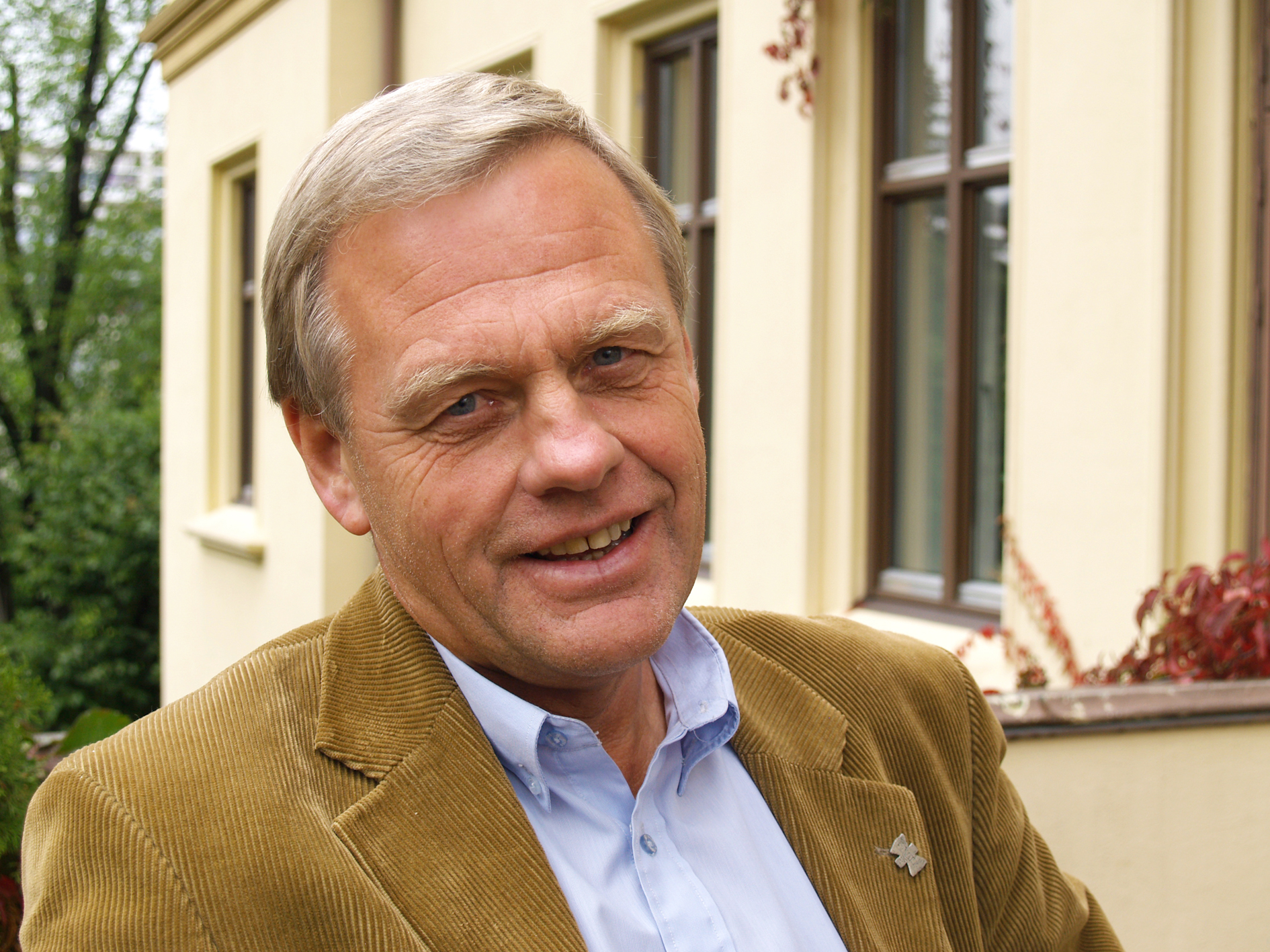
Ernst Oddvar Baasland

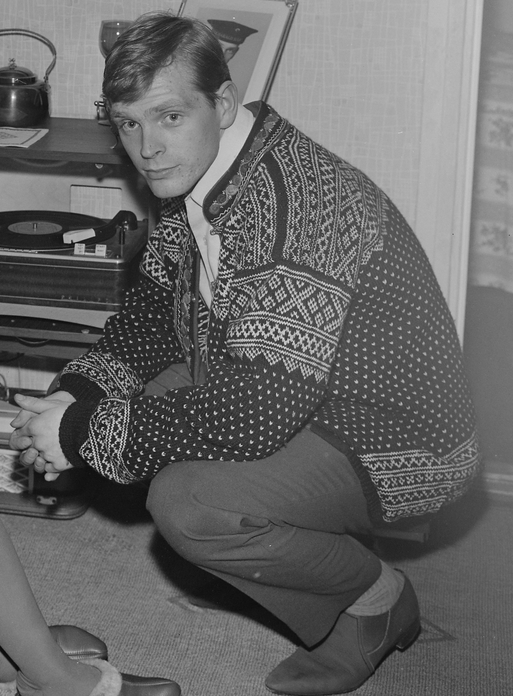
Halvard Kausland

- 1 April
  - Bjørnar Andresen, jazz musician (died 2004).
  - Per Kværne, tibetologist and historian of religion.
  - Nils-Per Skarseth, Olympic ski jumper.
- 3 April – Ernst Oddvar Baasland, bishop.
- 4 April – Sissel Benneche Osvold, journalist.
- 6 April – Sverre Lodgaard, political scientist and politician
- 6 April – Per Terje Vold, civil servant and businessperson.
- 9 April – Per Ludvig Magnus, diplomat (died 2015).
- 10 April – Bernt Øksendal, mathematician.
- 16 April – Britt Karin Larsen, poet and author.
- 18 April – Edvard Moseid, animal expert and zoo- and amusement park director (died 2026).
- 25 April
  - Ranja Hauglid, politician
  - Halvard Kausland, jazz guitarist (died 2017)
  - Arne Kvalheim, long-distance runner.
- 26 April – Paal-Helge Haugen, poet, novelist, dramatist and children's writer.
- 27 April – Kirsti Strøm Bull, professor of law
- 30 April – Kim Torkildsen, Olympic sailor.

=== May ===
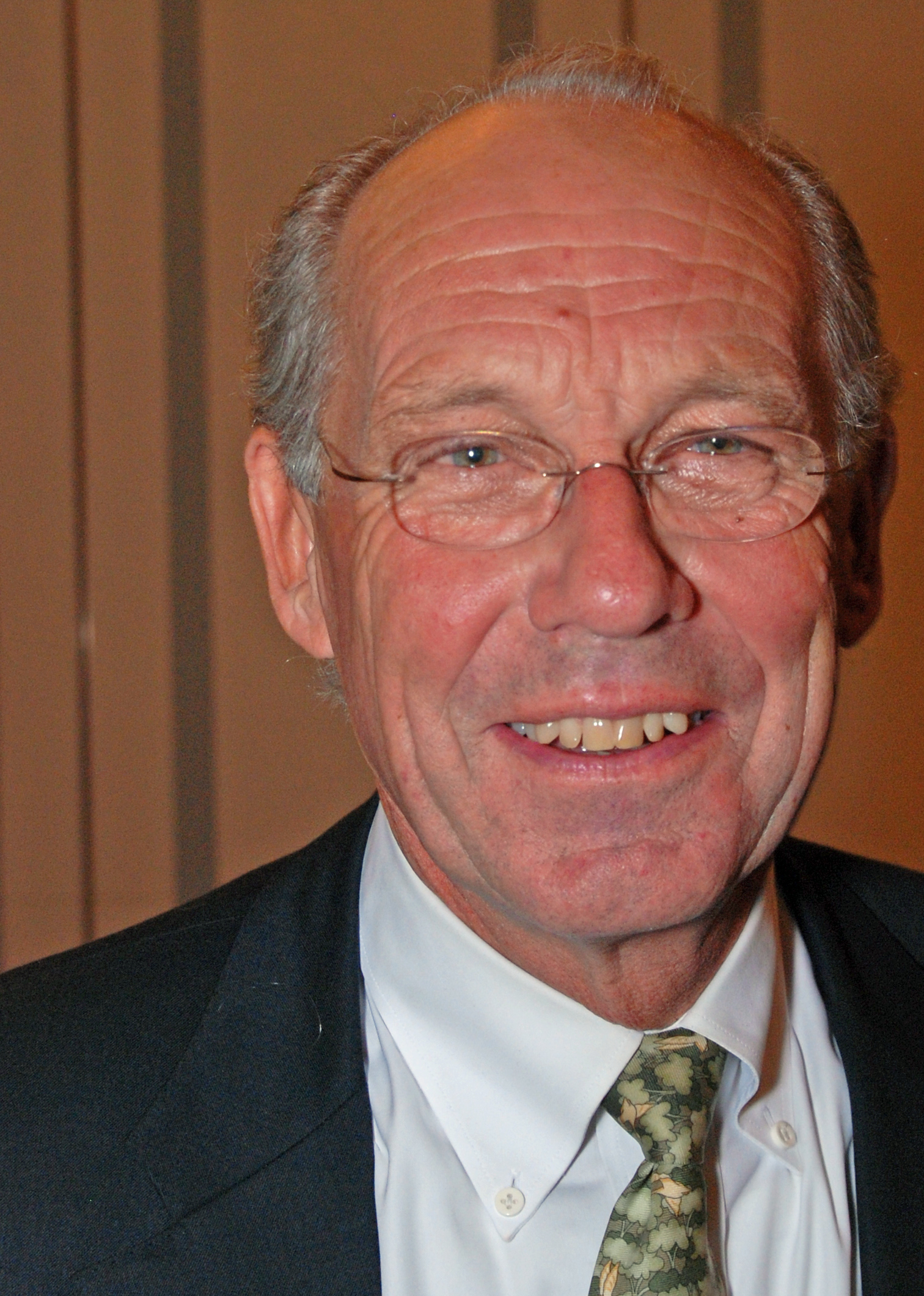
Jørgen Randers

- 2 May – Tore Linné Eriksen, historian.
- 3 May – Jan O. Henriksen, illustrator and editorial cartoonist (died 2018).
- 5 May – Tore Skau, sports shooter.
- 12 May –
  - Tormod Haugen, author (died 2008)
  - Leonard Rickhard, painter (died 2024).
- 13 May – Marius Haas, German diplomat
- 14 May – Truls Fyhn, police chief (died 2011).
- 16 May – Ingeborg Sorensen, model
- 19 May – Wera Sæther, psychologist and writer.
- 22 May – Jørgen Randers, economist and academic.
- 24 May – Eva Bugge, diplomat
- 26 May – Ågot Valle, politician.

=== June ===
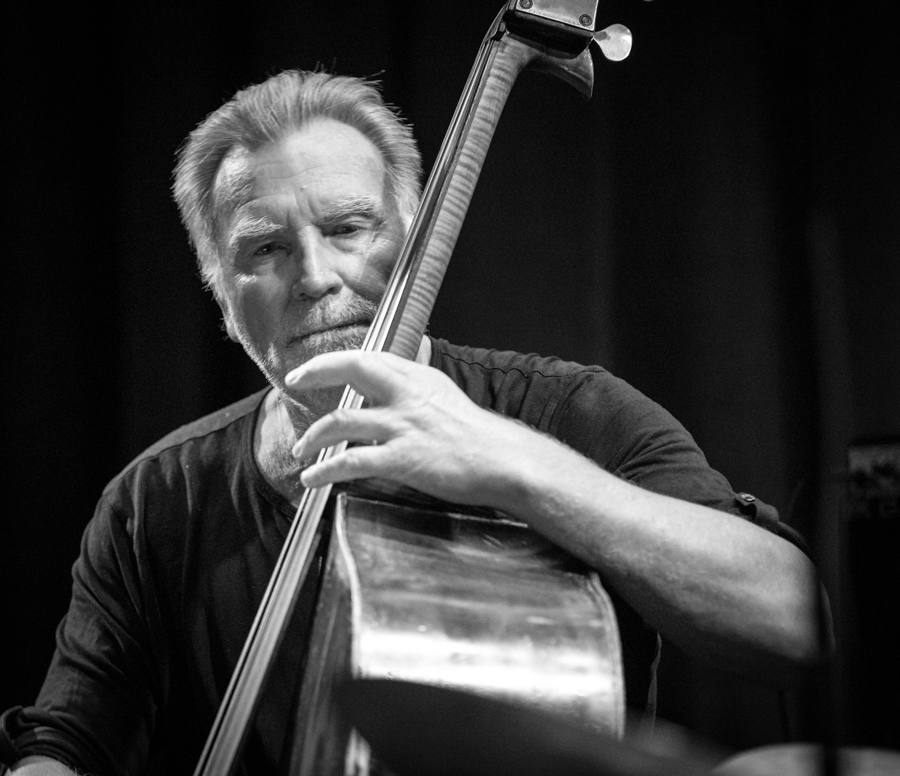
Bjørn Alterhaug

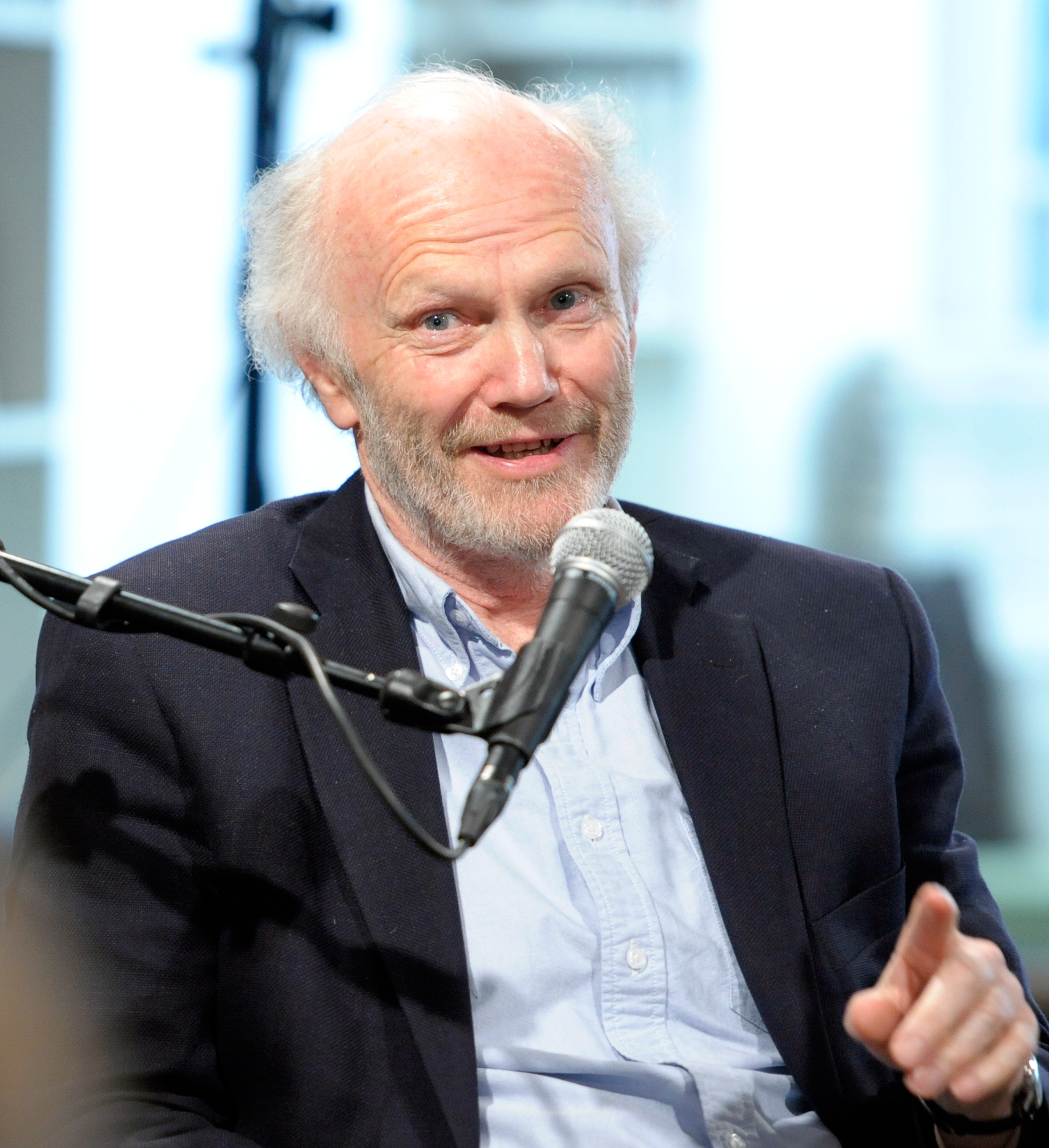
Geir Berdahl

- 2 June
  - Kolbjørn Almlid, businessperson and politician.
  - Signe Øye, politician.
- 3 June – Bjørn Alterhaug, jazz bassist, composer and professor of music.
- 10 June – Pål Sæthrang, footballer (died 2004).
- 12 June – Arne Myhrvold, sports official.
- 13 June – Tor Lian, sports official (died 2016).
- 16 June – Kari Garmann, politician.
- 17 June
  - Ragnar Fjoran, Olympic sailor.
  - Inge Thun, footballer (died 2008)
- 18 June – Jostein Helge Bernhardsen, diplomat
- 19 June – Geir Berdahl, publisher.
- 23 June – Kim Småge, crime fiction writer.
- 28 June – Magni Wentzel, jazz singer and guitarist

=== July ===
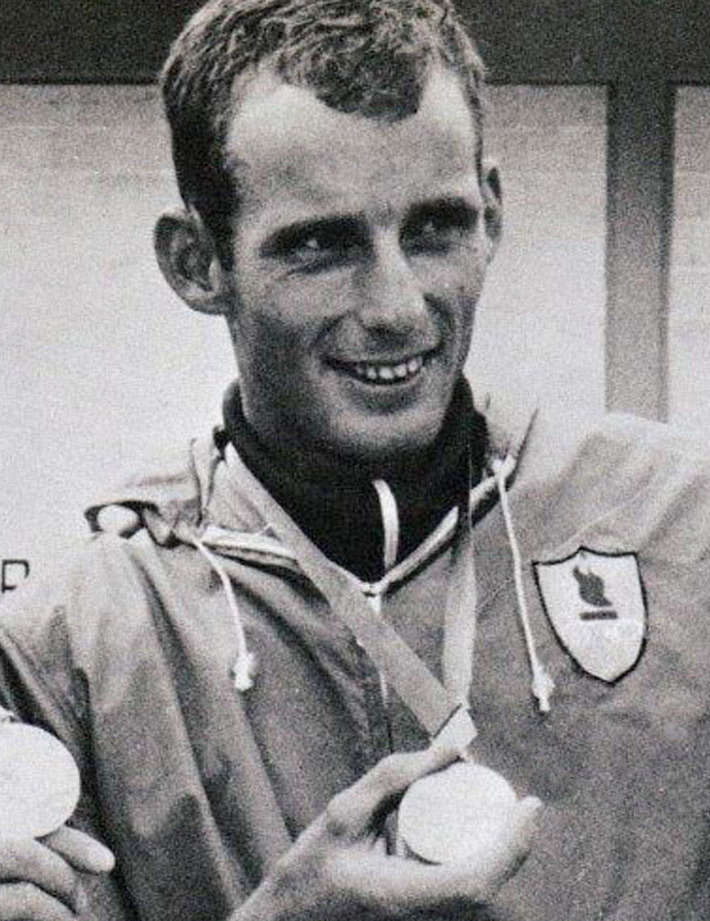
Steinar Amundsen

- 4 July – Steinar Amundsen, sprint canoer, Olympic gold medallist and World Champion (died 2022).
- 5 July – Stein Ringen, sociologist and political scientist.
- 6 July – Velle Espeland, folklorist (died 2024).
- 7 July – Knut Flatin, painter and printmaker (died 2025).
- 18 July
  - Are Holen, psychiatrist and psychologist.
  - Magnar Lussand, politician (died 2019).
- 20 July – Åse Wisløff Nilssen, politician.
- 23 July – Knut Brustad, middle-distance runner
- 24 July – Gunnar Halvorsen, politician (died 2006)
- 29 July – Nils Dag Strømme, Olympic boxer.

=== August ===
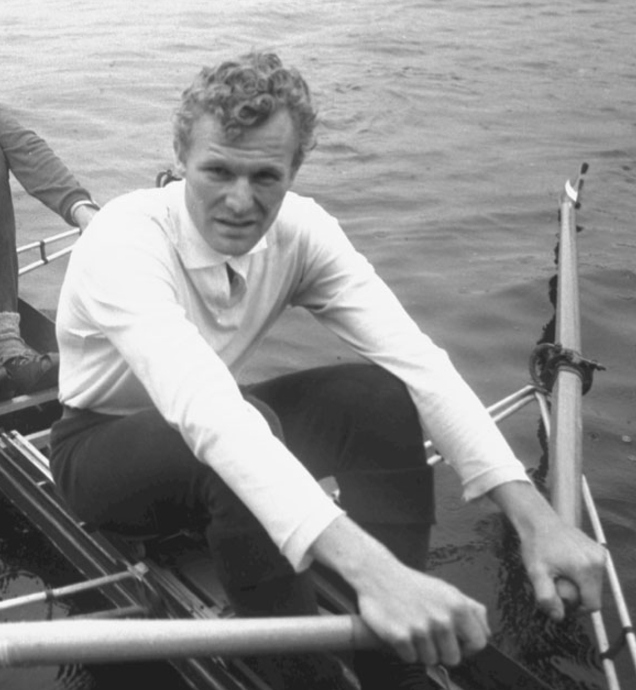
Frank Hansen

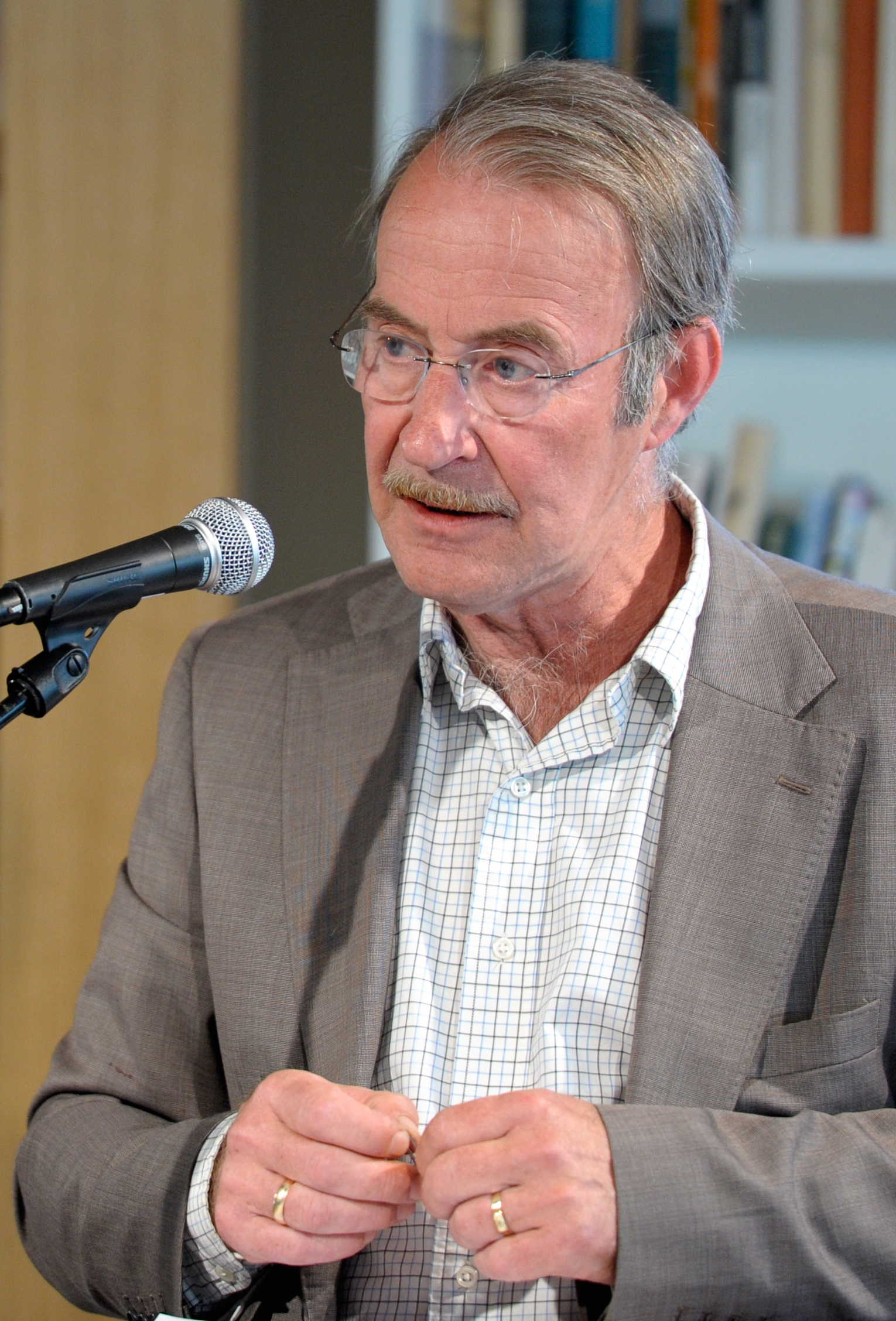
Hans H. Skei

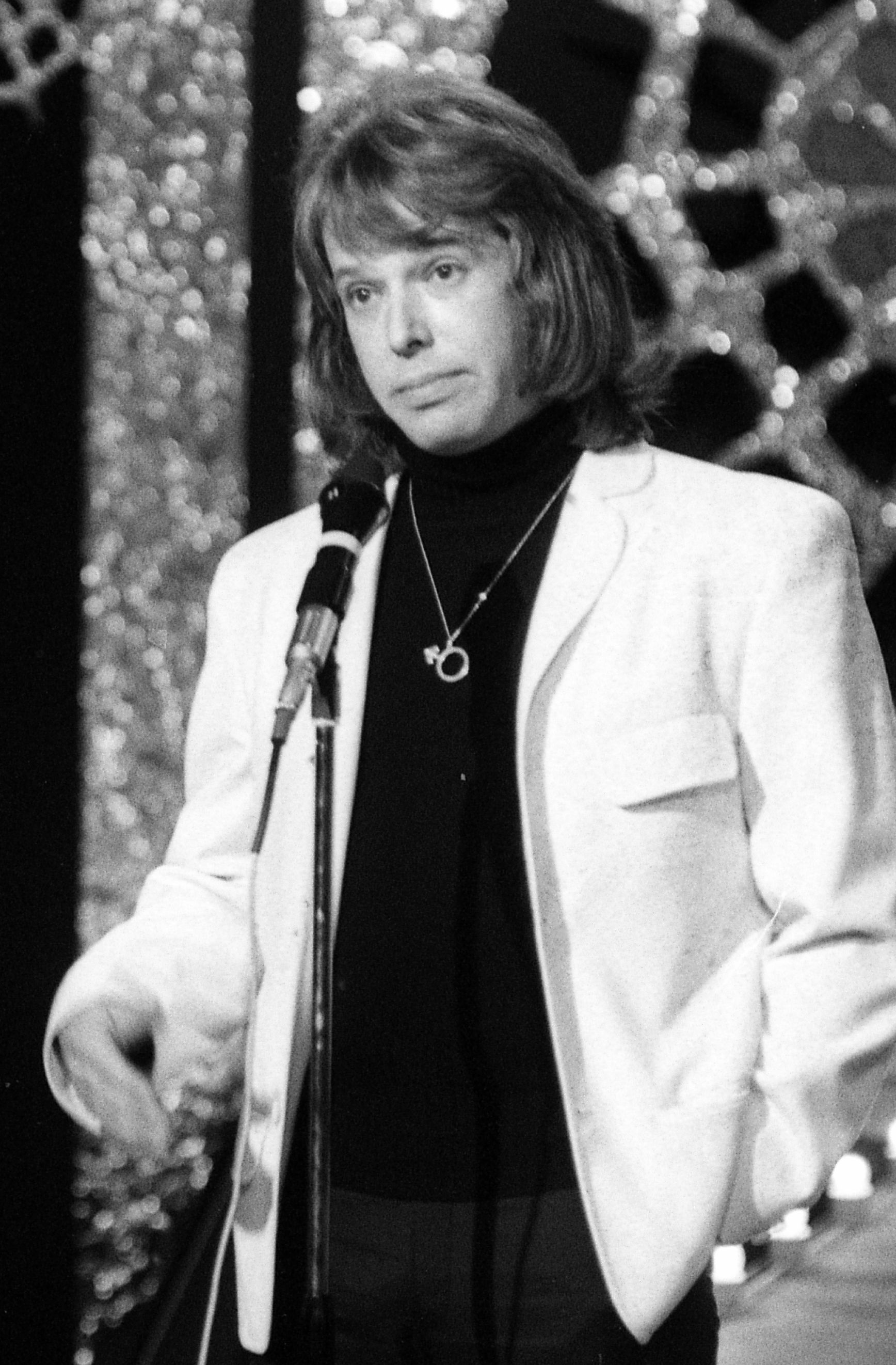
Stein Ingebrigtsen

- 3 August – Roar Løken, Olympic diver.
- 4 August – Frank Hansen, Olympic rower.
- 10 August – Tone Dahle, cross-country skier.
- 13 August – Georg Fredrik Rieber-Mohn, jurist, Director of Public Prosecution.
- 17 August – Arild Hiim, politician (died 2024).
- 20 August
  - Gretha Kant, politician.
  - Richard Simonsen, sprinter.
  - Hans H. Skei, literary scolar.
- 23 August – Stein Ingebrigtsen, singer.
- 29 August – Dag Klaveness, limnologist. (died 2020)

=== September ===
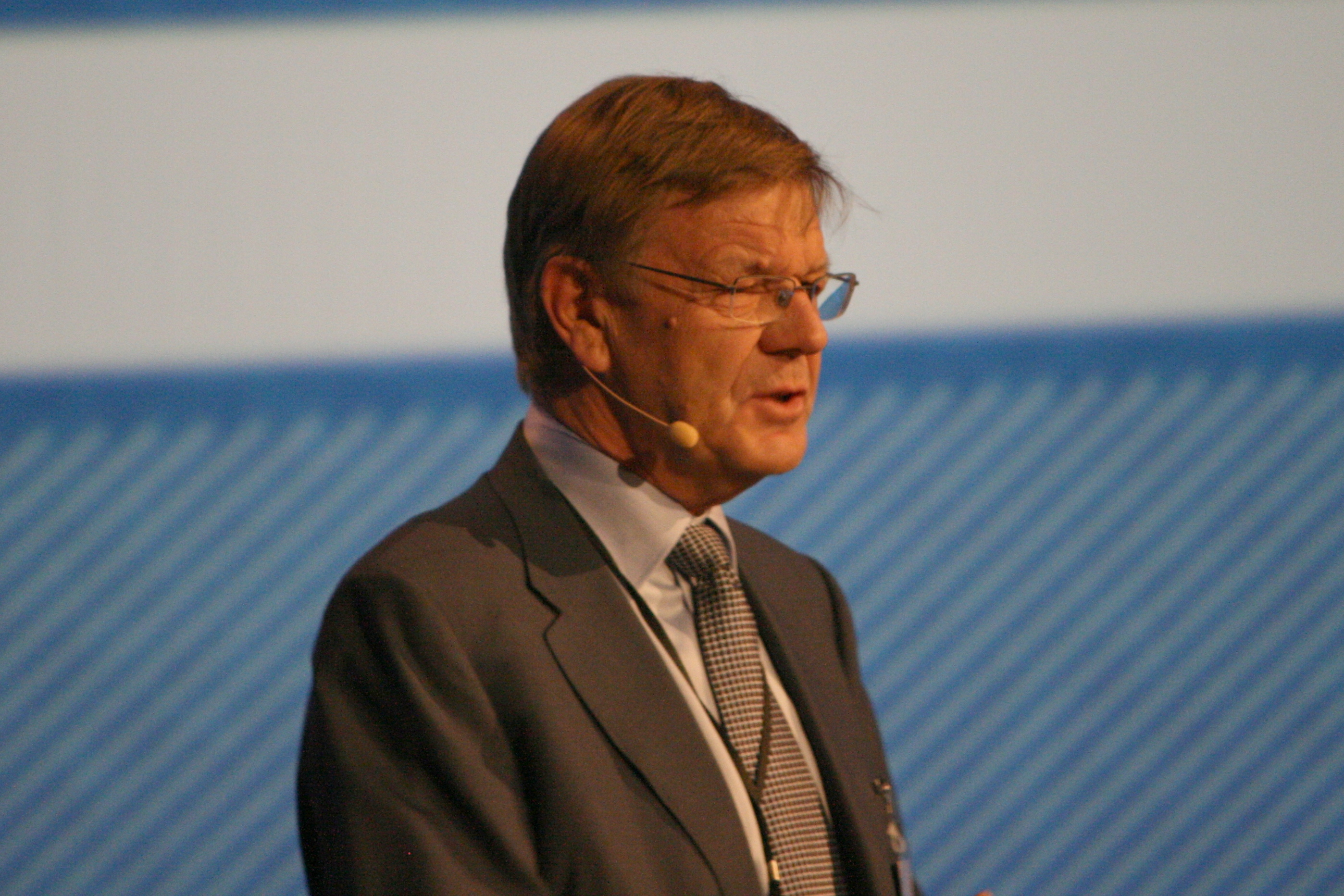
Finn Bergesen

- 2 September – Svein Finnerud, jazz pianist, painter and graphic artist (died 2000)
- 3 September
  - Finn Bergesen, civil servant and businessperson (died 2012).
  - Gro Hagemann, historian.
- 6 September – Jan-Axel Strøm, Olympic luger.
- 8 September – Frode Kyvåg, team handball coach and sports administrator.
- 11 September – Hallvard Skauge, illustrator.
- 13 September – Marit Røgeberg, politician (died 2020).
- 15 September
  - Ole Bøhn, violinist.
  - Ranveig Frøiland, politician (died 2020).
- 16 September – Dag Frøland, comedian and revue artist (died 2010)
- 19 September – Kristian Eidesvik, businessperson and politician (died 2024).
- 20 September
  - Torkild Brakstad, international soccer player and coach (died 2021)
  - Ragnhild Hilt, actress (died 2014).
- 23 September – Bjørgulv Froyn, politician
- 26 September – Jan von Koss, Olympic fencer.
- 30 September – Christian Reim, jazz musician (died 2025).

=== October ===
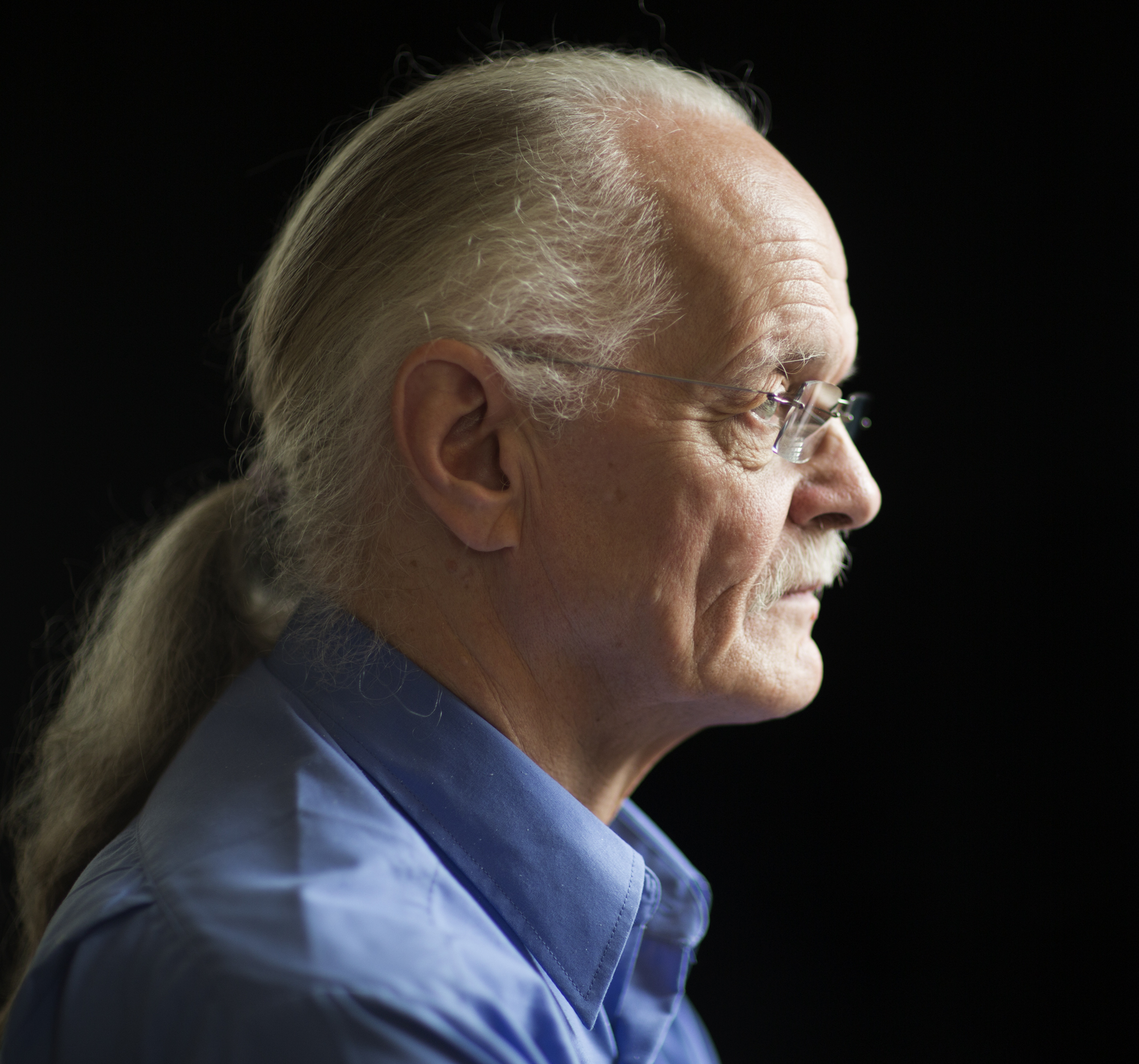
Robert Meyer

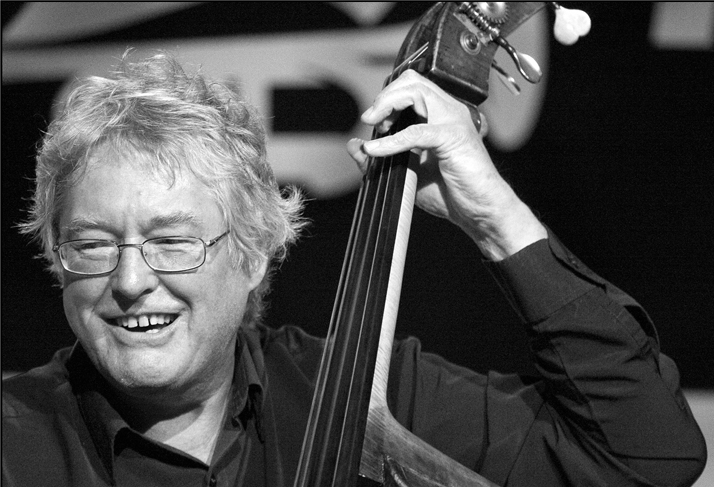
Arild Andersen

- 1 October
  - Britt Fredriksen, model
  - Jan Fuglset, soccer player
- 2 October – Robert Meyer, photographer and photo historian.
- 3 October – Trond Berg Eriksen, historian of ideas, non-fiction writer and magazine editor.
- 5 October – Inga Juuso, Sami singer and actress (died 2014)
- 6 Oktober – Sigbjørn Slinning, footballer.
- 7 October – Arne Herjuaune, speed skater (died 2017).
- 8 October
  - Kjersti Graver, jurist and Norwegian Consumer Ombudsman (died 2009)
  - Turid Karlsen Seim, theologian (died 2016).
- 18 October – Tore Bernt Ramton, sports official (died 2010).
- 20 October – Trond Kverno, composer.
- 23 October – Jon Lilletun, politician (died 2006).
- 25 October – Arne Aasheim, civil servant and diplomat.
- 27 October
  - Arild Andersen, bass player.
  - Ellen Bergli, politician
  - Kjell Hovda, biathlete.
- 31 October – Tove Bull, linguist.

=== November ===
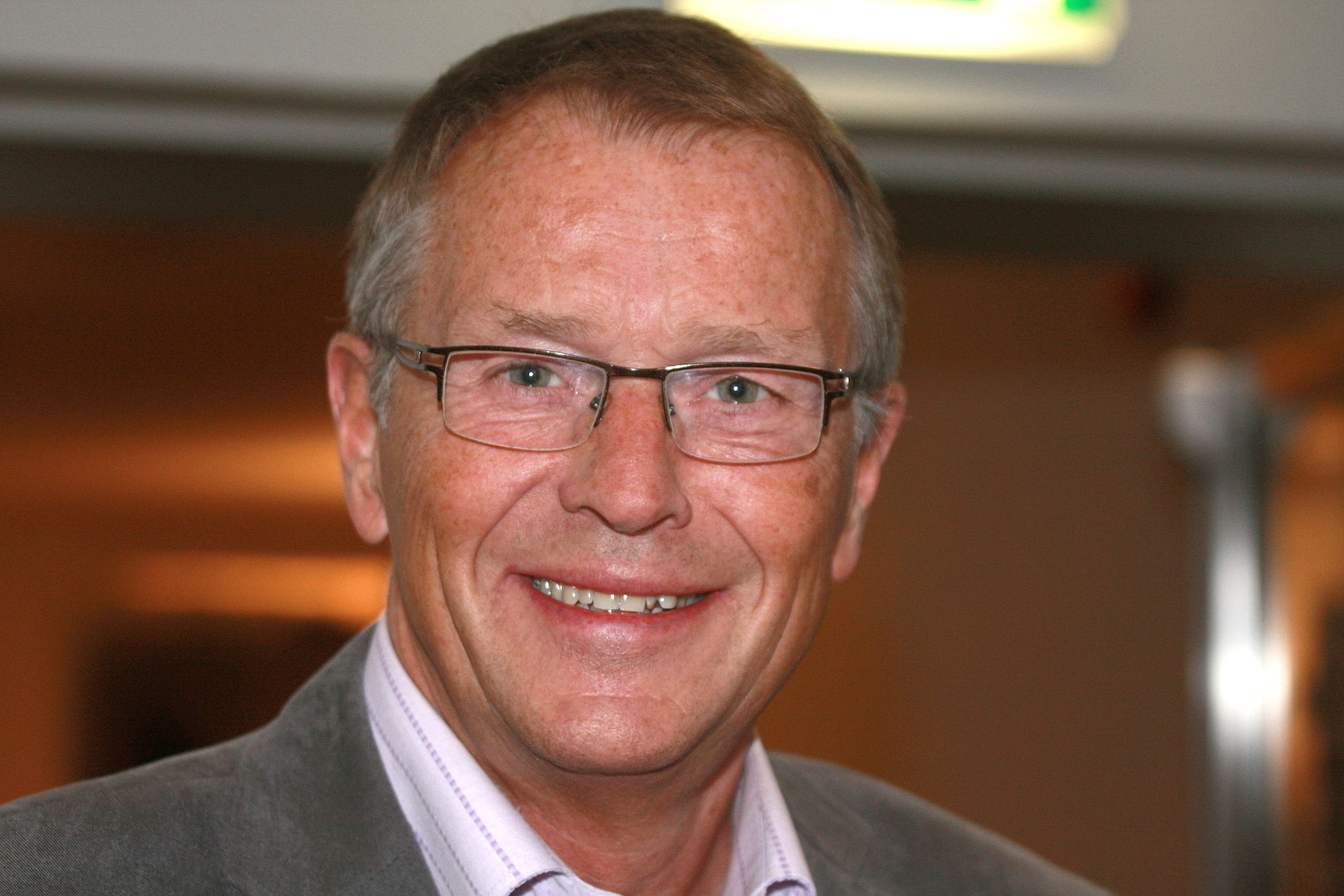
Svein Fjellheim

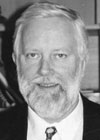
Torstein Moland

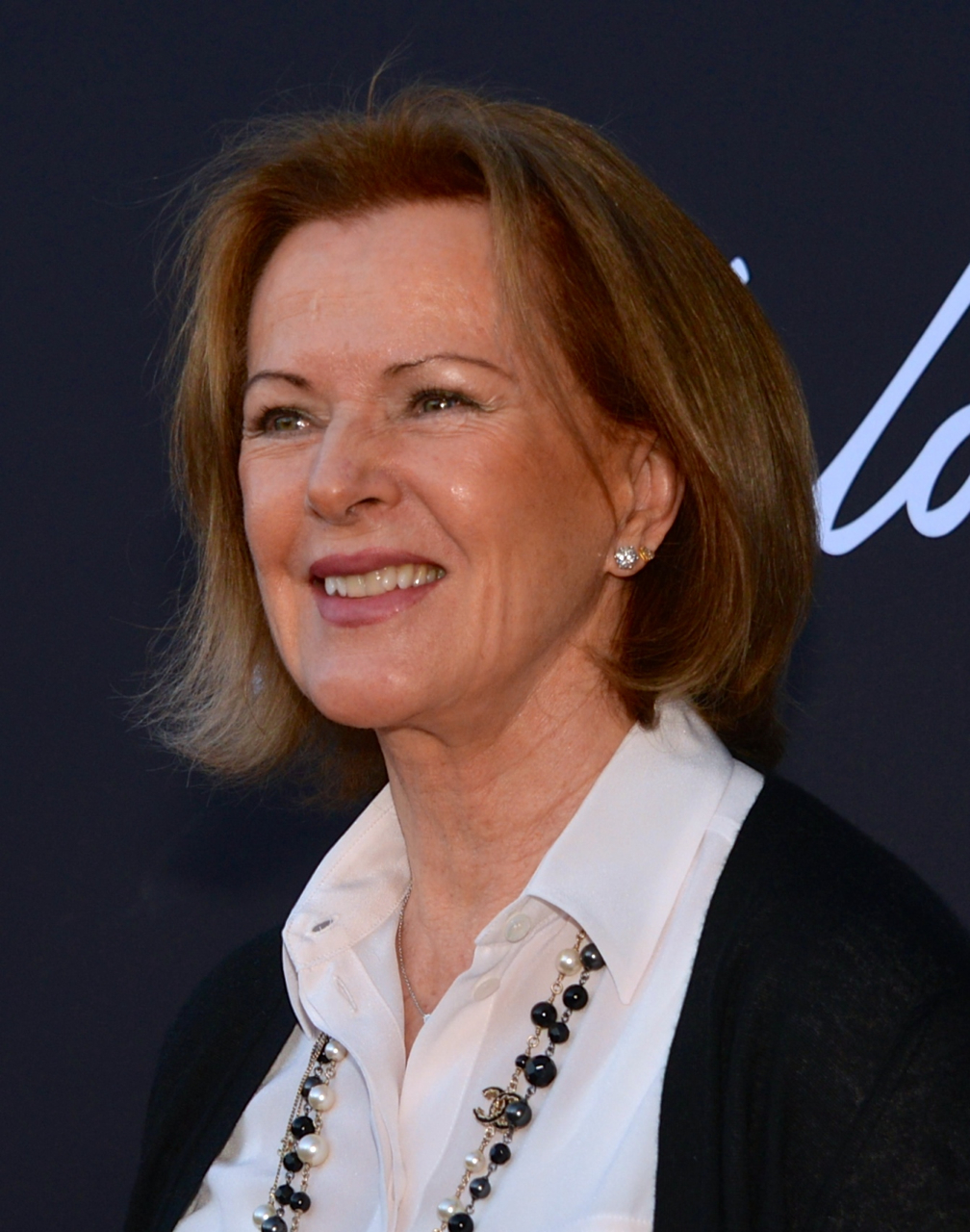
Anni-Frid Lyngstad

- 1 November
  - Svein Fjellheim, trade unionist and politician.
  - Grethe G. Fossum, politician (died 2019).
- 3 November
  - Tore Lie, Olympic gymnast.
  - Hilde Vogt, politician.
- 4 November – Torstein Moland, economist.
- 6 November
  - Odd Iversen, international soccer player (died 2014).
  - Knut Ødegård, poet.
- 8 November – Oscar Hillgaar, politician.
- 11 November – Anton Eliassen, meteorologist.
- 13 November
  - Lars Mjøen, comedian, actor and screenwriter.
  - Knut Riisnæs, jazz saxophonist.
- 15 November – Anni-Frid Lyngstad, singer, former ABBA member
- 20 November – Andreas Diesen, journalist and revue writer.
- 27 November – Magnhild Folkvord, journalist and biographer.
- 29 November – Fatma Jynge, Tanzania-born Norwegian architect and politician (died 2019).

=== December ===
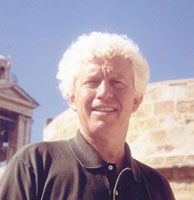
Odd Karsten Tveit

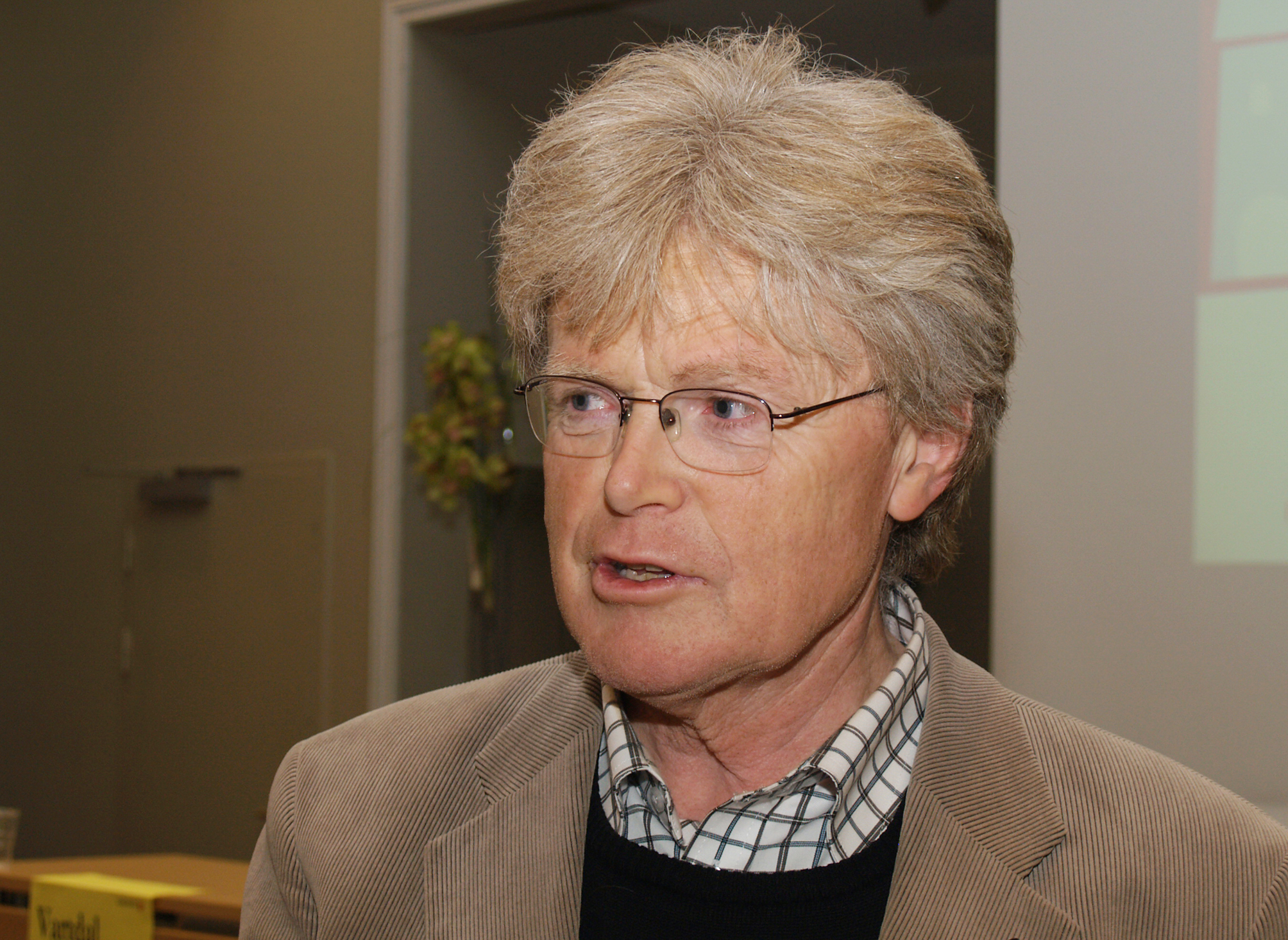
Tor Berger Jørgensen

- 3 December
  - Katja Medbøe, actress (died 1996).
  - Karin Moe, writer and literary critic.
  - Per Mohn, politician.
- 6 December – Ole Tinghaug, politician.
- 7 December – Liv Lindeland, model and actress
- 11 December – Ann-Marit Sæbønes, politician.
- 12 December – Trond Reinertsen, economist and business leader.
- 17 December – Odd Karsten Tveit, journalist and non-fiction writer
- 18 December – Jon Peter Rolie, novelist (died 2020).
- 24 December – Christian Hallén-Paulsen, Olympic luger (died 2012).
- 27 December
  - Tor Berger Jørgensen, bishop.
  - Finn Martin Vallersnes, politician.
- 31 December – Kirsten Huser Leschbrandt, politician.

=== Full date unknown ===
- Inge Fænn, journalist and writer.
- Turid Hundstad, civil servant.
- Odd F. Lindberg, freelance journalist, Arctic explorer and film maker
- Jostein Rise, social psychologist
- Jan Erik Skog, electrician, trade unionist and whistleblower
- Gro Steinsland, scholar of medieval studies and history of religion

== Notable deaths ==
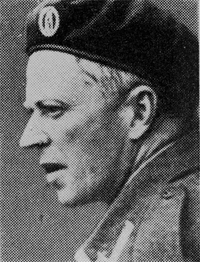
Leif Tronstad

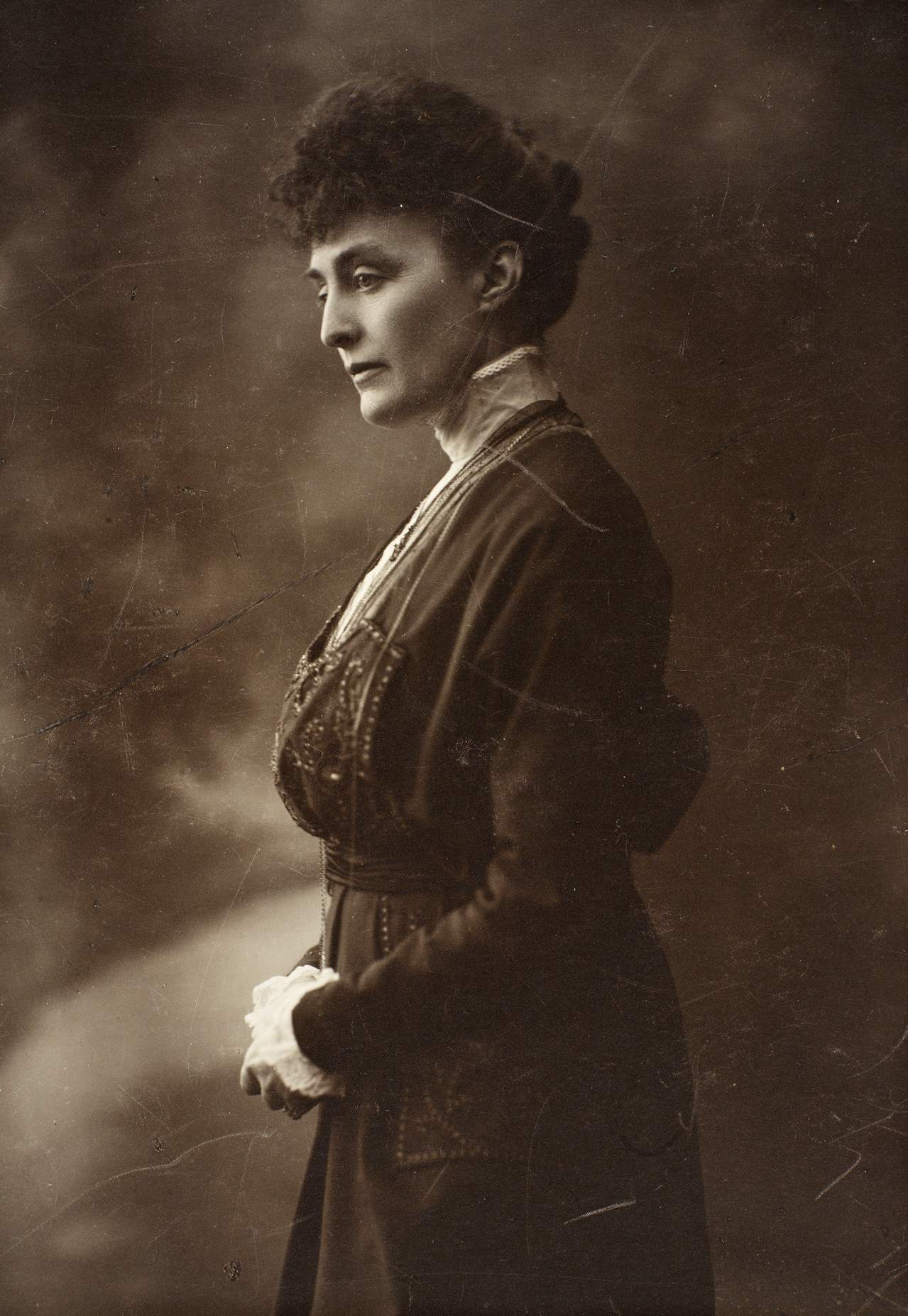
Katti Anker Møller

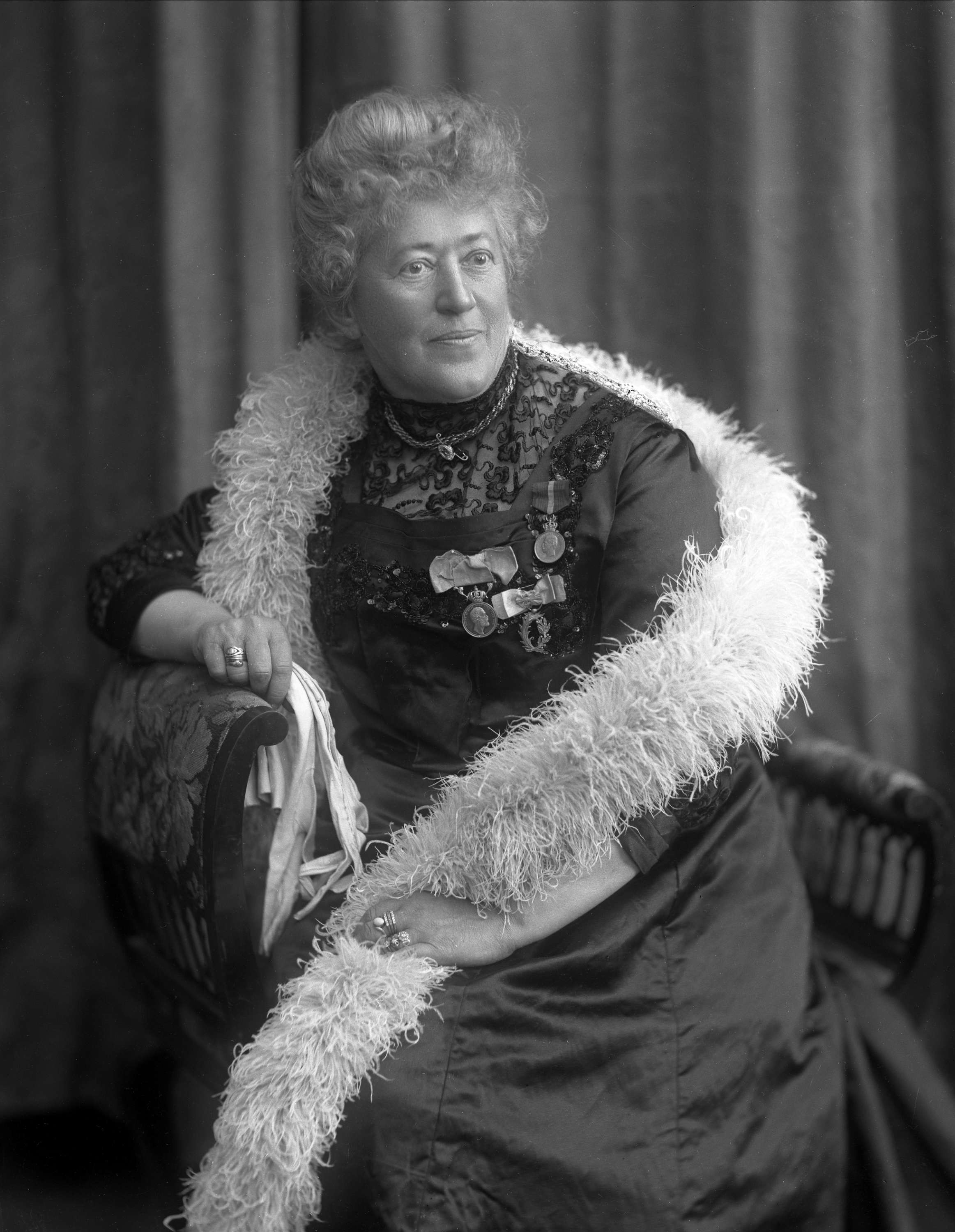
Clara Tschudi

- 9 January – Jan Østervold, sailor and Olympic gold medallist (born 1876)
- 11 January – Nils Uhlin Hansen, long jumper and resistance member (born 1919)
- 17 January – Harald Pedersen, metallurgist (born 1888).
- 5 February – Ludvik Buland, trade unionist (born 1893)
- 7 February – Halfdan Jønsson, trade unionist (born 1891).
- 8 February – Karl Marthinsen, commander of Statspolitiet and Sikkerhetspolitiet in Norway during the Nazi occupation (born 1896)
- 9 February
  - Kaare Sundby, engineer, resistance member, executed (born 1905)
  - Jon Vislie, lawyer, executed as a reprisal (born 1896)
- 13 February
  - Adolf Bogstad, resistance member, executed (born 1920)
  - Arvid Hansen, resistance member, executed (born 1916)
- 19 February – Frederik Prytz, politician (born 1878)
- 5 March – Per Lie, labour activist (born 1907)
- 11 March
  - Gunnar Syverstad, resistance member (born 1910).
  - Leif Tronstad, scientist, intelligence officer and military organizer (born 1903)
- 17 March
  - Henry Gundersen, resistance member, executed (born 1920)
  - Kåre Olafsen, resistance member, executed (born 1920)
  - Frank Olsen, resistance member, executed (born 1922)
- 4 April – Roy Nielsen, resistance member (born 1916).
- 17 April – Gerdt Henrik Meyer Bruun, politician and Minister (born 1873)
- 30 April – Worm Hirsch Darre-Jenssen, engineer, politician and Minister (born 1870)
- 7 May – Christian Albrecht Jakhelln, businessperson and politician (born 1863)
- 8 May – Josef Terboven, Reichskommissar during the German military occupation of Norway, suicide (born 1898)
- 10 May – Henrik Rogstad, politician and police leader, collaborator, suicide (born 1916)
- 11 May – Jonas Lie, politician, minister and police leader, collaborator (born 1899)
- 27 June – Kai Holst, resistance fighter (born 1913)
- 3 July – Fredrik Barbe Wallem, art historian (born 1877).
- 12 July – Bjørn Talén, opera singer (born 1890)
- 17 August – Reidar Haaland, police officer and collaborator, executed (born 1919)
- 20 August – Katti Anker Møller, feminist, children's rights advocate and pioneer of reproductive rights (born 1868).

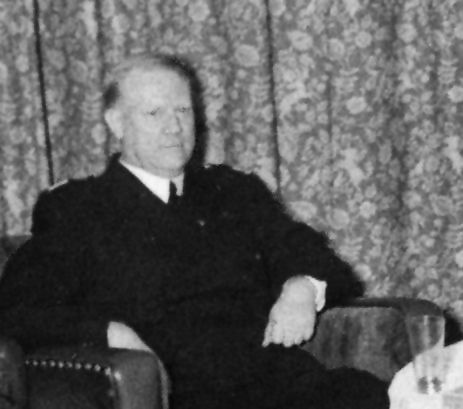
On 24 October Vidkun Quisling was executed by a firing squad

- 24 October – Vidkun Quisling, army officer, politician and Minister-President of Norway, executed (born 1887)
- 16 September – Oluf Wesmann-Kjær, rifle shooter (born 1874)
- 2 October – Leif Grung, architect (born 1894)
- 1 November – Olaf Sæther, rifle shooter and Olympic gold medallist (born 1872)
- 10 November – Clara Tschudi, writer (born 1856).
- 20 November – Jacob Thorkelson, elected official, naval officer and medical doctor in America (born 1876)
