= Rune Andersson =

Rune Andersson may refer to:

- Rune Andersson (rower) (1930–2006), Swedish rower
- Rune Andersson (sport shooter) (1919–1992), Swedish sports shooter
- Rune Johan Andersson (born 1945), Norwegian cartoonist, illustrator and children's writer
