= Prebensen =

Prebensen is a Norwegian surname. Notable people with the surname include:

- Inger Prebensen (born 1945), Norwegian jurist and banker
- Nikolai Prebensen (1850–1938), Norwegian politician
- Per Preben Prebensen (1895–1961), Norwegian diplomat
