= Thorbjørn Gjølstad =

Norwegian jurist (1942–2015)

Thorbjørn Gjølstad (29 September 1942 – 26 May 2015) was a Norwegian jurist and civil servant.

He graduated with the cand.jur. degree from the University of Oslo in 1968, and served as a deputy judge at Eidsvoll District Court. He was hired in Riksskattestyret, the Norwegian Tax Administration, and also worked in the Norwegian Prosecuting Authority before serving as head of the Tax Law Department in the Ministry of Finance from 1988 to 2012. In the year of his retirement he was decorated as a Knight, First Class of the Order of St. Olav.

He was married to Supreme Court justice Liv Gjølstad.
