= Svein Fjellheim =

Norwegian trade unionist and politician

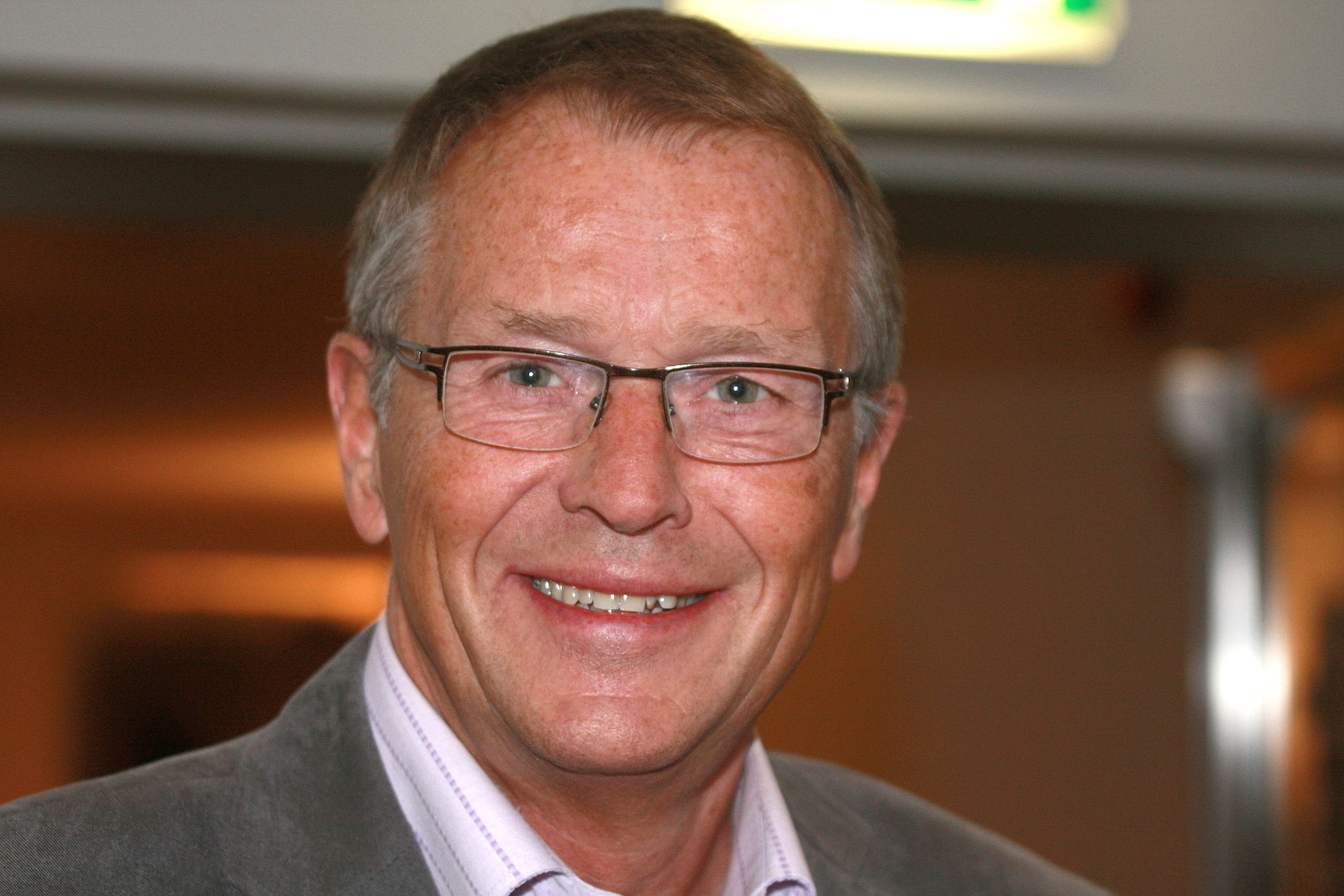
- Svein Fjellheim during Industri Energi Congress 2010
- Born: 1 November 1945 (age 79)
- Occupation: Norwegian politician

Svein Fjellheim (born 1 November 1945) is a Norwegian trade unionist and politician for the Labour Party.

He was educated as a sausage maker in 1965. From 1981 he worked as a trade union secretary in Stavanger, and from 1995 in Rogaland county. He was a member of the national board of the Norwegian Union of Food, Beverage and Allied Workers from 1977 to 1993. He was involved in local politics as a member of Stavanger city council from 1975 to 1995, since 1979 as a member of the executive committee.

When the Stoltenberg's Second Cabinet assumed office following the 2005 election, he was appointed State Secretary in the Office of the Prime Minister. He left office in 2012.

He has been a member of the board of Rogalands Avis (1976–1992), Kino1 Gruppen (1981–2005), Landsbanken (1993–2000), the Norwegian Industrial and Regional Development Fund (1996–2004), Stavanger University College (2000–2003) and Fredskorpset (2004–2006).
