= Bjørg Mikalsen =

Norwegian politician (born 1945)

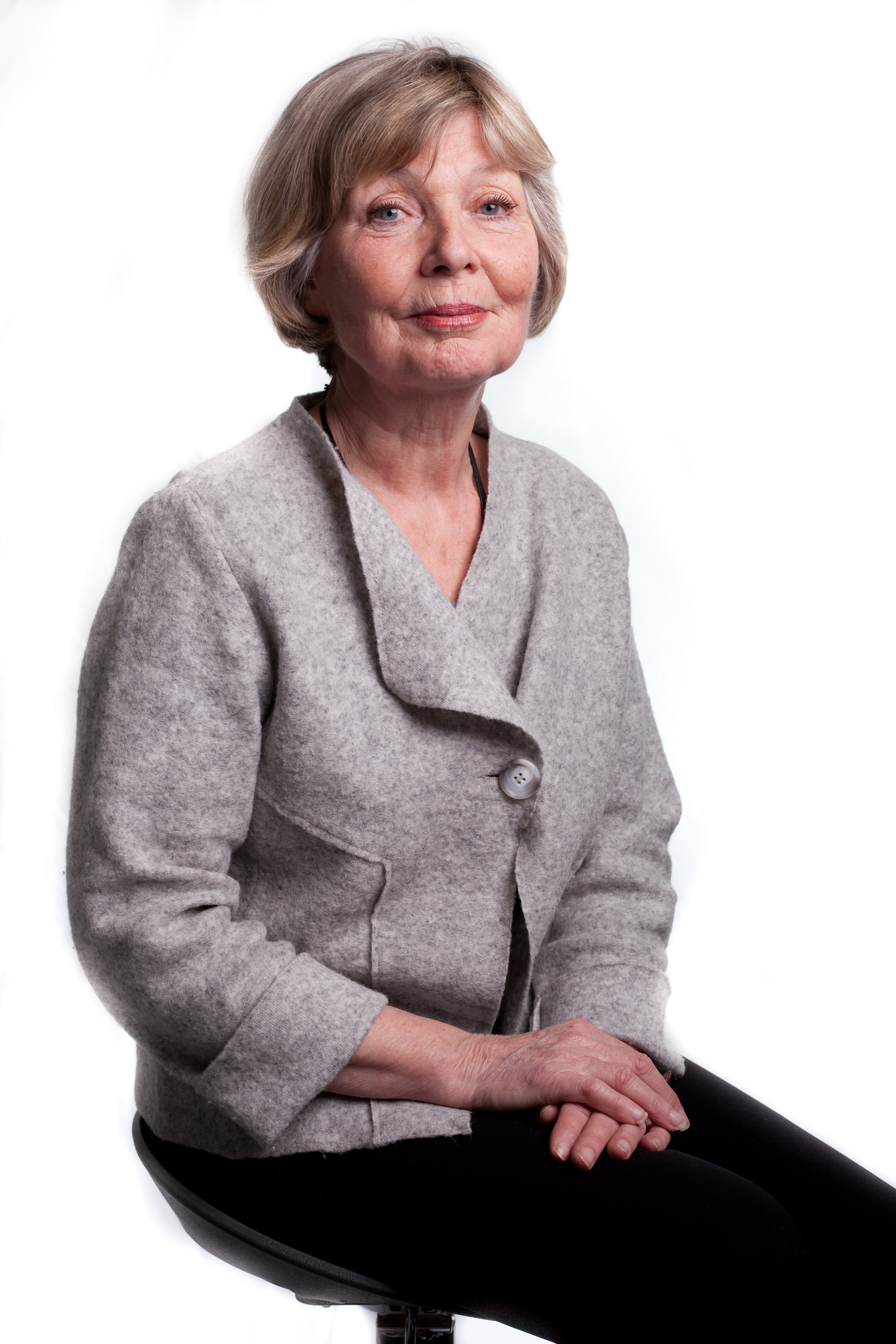
Bjørg Mikalsen

Bjørg Mikalsen (born 8 February 1945) is a Norwegian politician for the Liberal Party. She served as a deputy representative to the Norwegian Parliament from Sogn og Fjordane during the term 2005 to 2009. In total she met during 16 days of parliamentary session.
