= Terje Ottar =

Norwegian politician (born 1945)

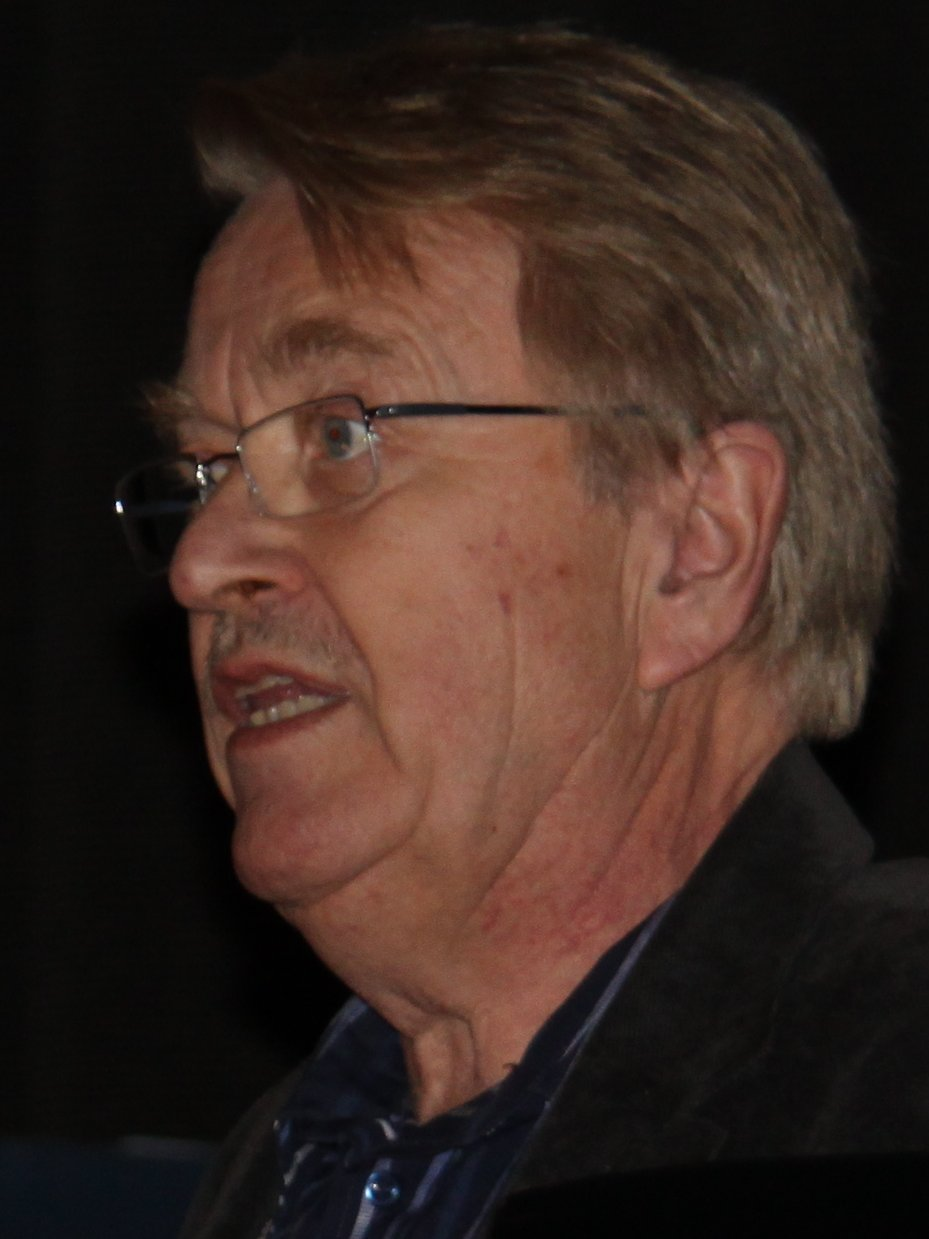
Terje Ottar at the opening of Vestfold Progress Party's annual meeting in 2010

Terje Ottar (born 18 March 1945) is a Norwegian politician for the Progress Party.

He served as a deputy representative to the Parliament of Norway from Telemark during the terms 1989–1993 and 1993–1997. In total he met during 81 days of parliamentary session.
