= 1945 Norwegian local elections =

== Result of municipal elections ==
Results of the 1945 municipal elections.

Party	Votes	%	Seats
Labour Party	510,674	37.95	5,693
Upolitiske, lokale og andre lister	152,875	11.36	2,739
Liberal Party-Radical People's Party	165,091	12.27	1,973
Borgerlige felleslister	79,886	5.94	1,413
Communist Party	146,901	10.92	1,004
Christian Democratic Party	101,328	7.53	804
Farmers' Party	49,611	3.69	784
Conservative Party	124,183	9.23	555
Småbrukere, arbeidere og fiskere	15,215	1.13	332
Total	1,345,764	100.00	15,297
Registered voters/turnout	2,061,297	–	
Source: Élections en 1945 pour les conseils communaux et municipaux
