= Dag Klaveness (limnologist) =

Norwegian limnologist (1945–2020)

Dag Klaveness (29 August 1945 – 20 October 2020) was a Norwegian limnologist.

He was born in Sandefjord. After taking his cand.real. degree in marine botany at the University of Oslo in 1971, he was hired as a lecturer at the University of Oslo in 1974, and in 1992 promoted to professor. He died in October 2020 in Oslo.
