= Ragnar Fjoran =

Norwegian sailor

Personal information
- Nationality: Norwegian
- Born: 17 June 1945 (age 79); Trondheim

Sport
- Country: Norway
- Sport: Sailing

Ragnar Fjoran (born 17 June 1945) is a Norwegian sailor. He was born in Trondheim. He competed at the 1972 Summer Olympics in Munich.
