= Marit Røgeberg =

Norwegian politician (1945–2020)

Marit Røgeberg (13 September 1945 – 27 June 2020) was a Norwegian politician for the Socialist Left Party.

She grew up at Kjelsås and lived in London, Oslo and Holmen before settling in Heggedal in 1978. She was elected member of Asker municipal council from 1976 to 1984 and Akershus county council from 1991 to 1995. She served as a deputy representative to the Parliament of Norway from Akershus during the term 1985–1989. In total she met during 16 days of parliamentary session.

She worked with marketing in the local newspaper Asker og Bærums Budstikke, and was active in the Norwegian Humanist Association, Amnesty International and the Norwegian Red Cross among others.

Røgeberg died on 27 June 2020.
