= Per Mohn =

Norwegian politician (born 1945)

Per Mohn (born 3 December 1945) is a Norwegian politician for the Progress Party.

He served as a deputy representative to the Norwegian Parliament from Akershus during the term 1989–1993. In total he met during 12 days of parliamentary session.
