= Gretha Kant =

Norwegian politician

Gretha Kant (born 20 August 1945) was a Norwegian politician for the Conservative Party.

She started her political career in the 1970s, and has been a member of Moss city council and Østfold county council. In 1995 she became mayor of Moss, the first female in the position and the first non-Labour mayor in 68 years. She survived the next election and served as mayor for eight years.

She served as a deputy representative to the Parliament of Norway from Østfold during the term 2001–2005. In total she met during 11 days of parliamentary session. She has chaired the Railway Forum East, which is a lobby group for railway lines east of Oslo such as the Østfold Line. She has also been county leader of the Norwegian Horticulture Society.
