= Kirsti Strøm Bull =

Norwegian professor of law

Kirsti Strøm Bull (born 27 April 1945) is a Norwegian professor of law.

She took the cand.jur. degree in 1969 and the dr.juris degree in 1993. Having worked at the University of Oslo since 1971, she was promoted to associate professor in 1987 and professor in 1997. Her specialty is family law and Sami-related law. She is a member of the Norwegian Academy of Science and Letters.
