= Geir Berdahl =

Norwegian publisher

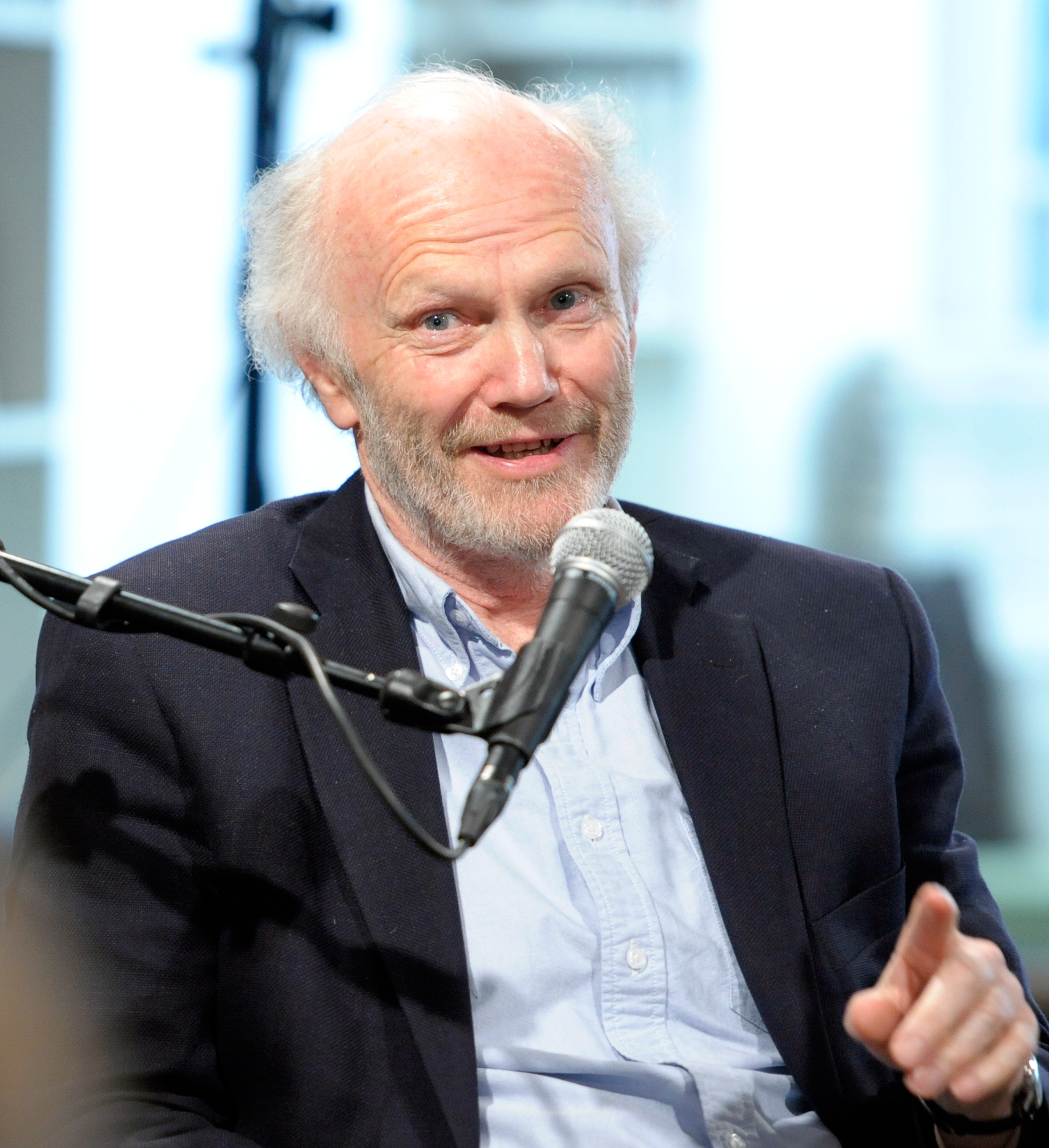
- Born: 19 June 1945 (age 81); Trondheim, Norway
- Education: University of Oslo
- Occupation: Publisher

Geir Berdahl (born 19 June 1945) is a Norwegian publisher, the leader of Forlaget Oktober for 35 years.

== Life and career ==
Berdahl was born in Trondheim, and subsequently moved to Oslo with his mother and three siblings.

In the 1970s Berdahl was associated with SUF (m-l) and the Workers' Communist Party AKP (m-l). He graduated as mag.art in literature from the University of Oslo in 1974. From 1974 to 1979 he was running the bookshop Tronsmo. He was chief executive officer of the publishing house Forlaget Oktober from 1979 to 2015.

From 2003 to 2006 he was chairman of the board of the newspaper Klassekampen, and he chaired the Norwegian Publishers' Association a period from 2005.

He has written the memoir book 40 års nervøsitet, about the publishing house Oktober and his period with the company.
