= Ole Tinghaug =

Norwegian politician (born 1945)

Ole Tinghaug (born 6 December 1945) is a Norwegian politician for the Progress Party.

He served as a deputy representative to the Parliament of Norway from Aust-Agder during the terms 1989–1993 and 1997–2001. In total he met during 14 days of parliamentary session.
