= Knut Flatin =

Norwegian painter and printmaker (1945–2025)

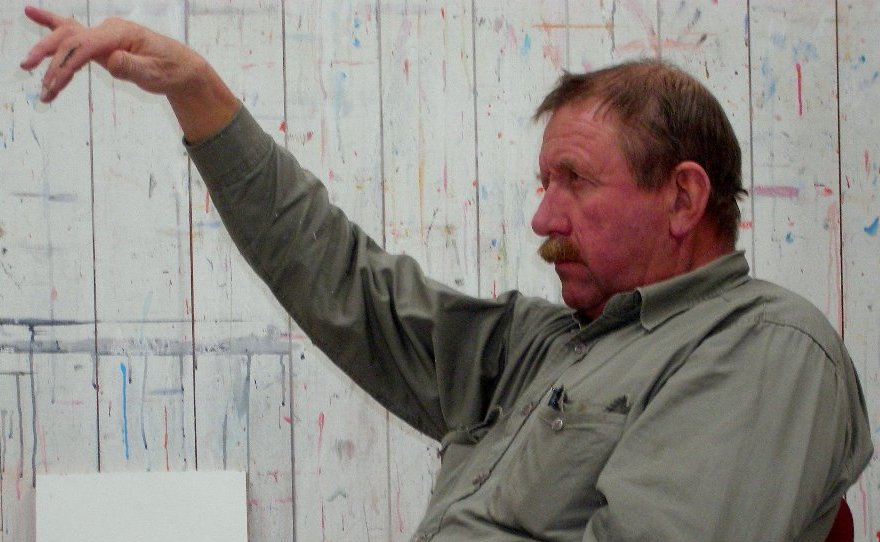
- Born: 7 July 1945; Seljord Municipality, Norway
- Died: 11 February 2025 (aged 79)
- Education: Norwegian National Academy of Craft and Art Industry; Norwegian National Academy of Fine Arts
- Occupations: Painter and printmaker

Knut Flatin (7 July 1945 – 11 February 2025) was a Norwegian painter and printmaker.

== Personal life ==
Flatin was born in Seljord Municipality on 7 July 1945, a son of Eivind Flatin and Anna Nordskog. He was married to Anne Brit Borgen.

== Career ==
Flatin studied at the Norwegian National Academy of Craft and Art Industry from 1964 to 1967, and at the Norwegian National Academy of Fine Arts from 1967 to 1972, under Reidar Aulie, Alf-Jørgen Aas, Halvdan Ljøsne, and Arne Malmedal.

His printing techniques included serigraphy, elements of photos, woodcuts and aquatints. His paintings typically have elements of large coloured flats interspersed with contrasting smaller colour spots.

He made his exhibition debut at Høstutstillingen in 1964. His works at the National Museum of Norway include the paintings Skjebne (1976), Mot vår (1984), Påskemorgen (1978), and Interiør med musikk (1979).

Flatin died on 11 February 2025, at the age of 79.
