= Hans H. Skei =

Norwegian editor and writer (born 1945)

External images
- Hans H. Skei
- Hans H. Skei 1 (bilde). Portrait at SNL.
- Hans H Skei Portrait at UiO.

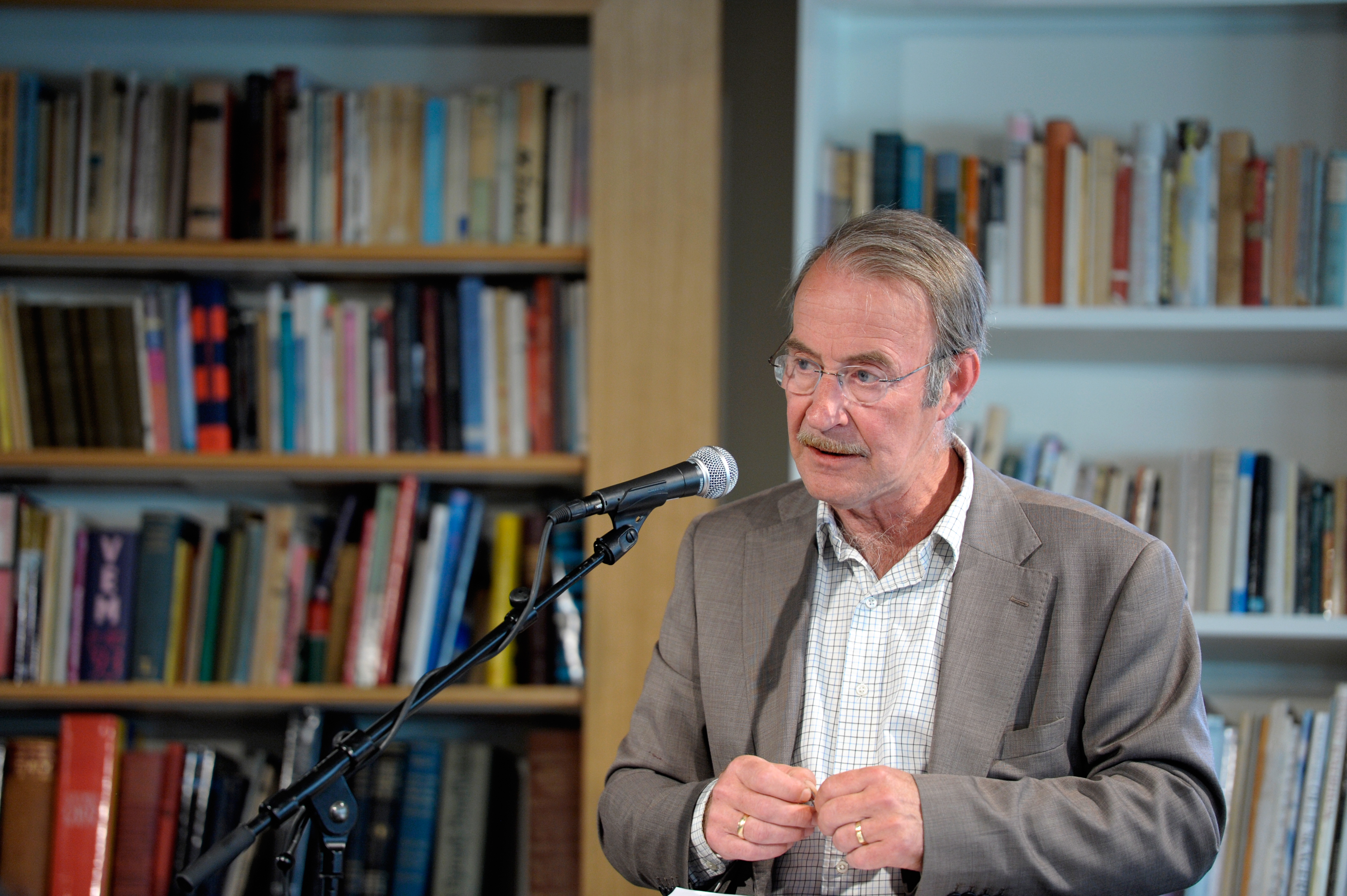
Hans Skei (2011)

Hans Hanssen Skei (born 20 August 1945) is a Norwegian editor and writer.

He was born in Dønna, and graduated as Ph.D. with the treatise "The novelist as short story writer : a study of William Faulkner's short stories with special emphasis on the period 1928-1932" at the University of Oslo. He has been the editor-in-chief of Nordisk Tidskrift since 2002. Skei has provided a large amount of literary criticism on the works of William Faulkner, and has also translated some of his books.

He is a member of the Norwegian Academy of Science and Letters.

== Selected works ==
- The Novelist as Short Story Writer. 1985.
- Om litteraturhistorieskriving. 1992 [1983]. ISBN 82-90359-16-0.
- Å lese litteratur. Lærebok i litterær analyse. 1992. ISBN 82-417-0138-1.
- På litterære lekeplasser. Studier i moderne metafiksjonsdiktning. 1995. ISBN 82-00-22376-0.
- Reading Faulkner's Best Short Stories. 1999. ISBN 1-57003-286-6.
- Faulkner and Other Southern Writers. 2004. ISBN 82-7099-392-1.
- Blodig alvor. Om kriminallitteraturen. 2008. ISBN 978-82-03-19431-3.
- Den lille forfatterboka - Krim. 2009. ISBN 978-82-7022-325-1.
