= Nils-Per Skarseth =

Norwegian former ski jumper (born 1945)

Nils-Per Skarseth (born 1 April 1945) is a Norwegian former ski jumper. He was born in Oslo, and represented the club Lørenskog Skiklubb. He competed at the 1972 Winter Olympics in Sapporo. He was Norwegian champion in large hill in 1973.
