= Velle Espeland =

Norwegian folklorist (1945–2024)

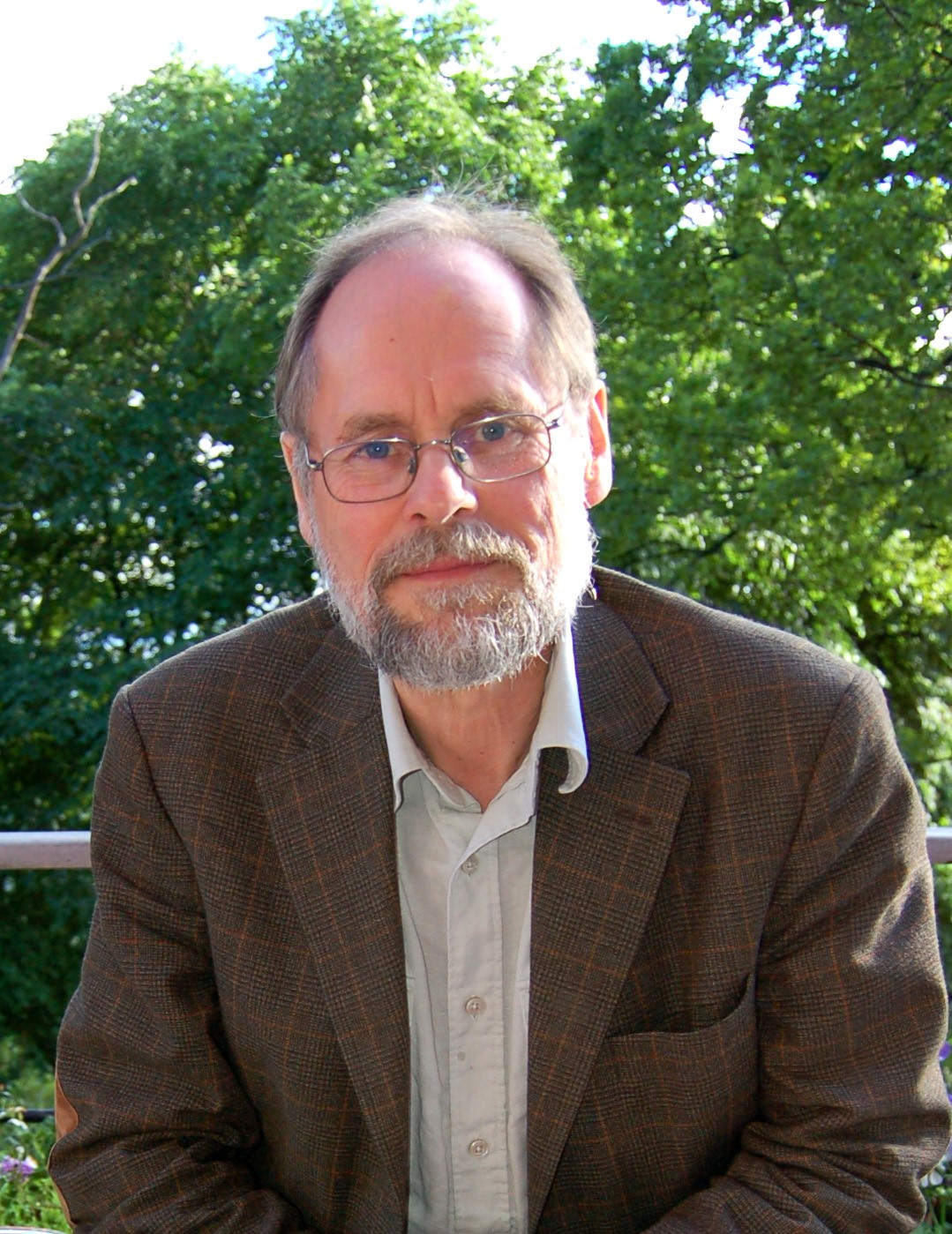
- Born: 6 July 1945; Sør-Fron, Norway
- Died: 10 January 2024 (aged 78); Oslo, Norway
- Education: University of Oslo
- Occupation: Folklorist

Velle Espeland (6 July 1945 – 10 January 2024) was a Norwegian folklorist.

== Personal life and education ==
Born in Sør-Fron Municipality on 6 July 1945, Espeland studied folkloristics at the University of Oslo. His cand.mag. thesis from 1974 was titled Folkesong i Bjerkreim.

== Career ==
Espeland was assigned to Institutt for kulturstudier at the University of Oslo from 1974 to 2003. He also administrated the institution Norsk visearkiv from its foundation in 1983.

Among his publications are two books about ghosts, the children's book Den store boka om spøkelser from 1999, and the factbook Spøkelse. Hvileløse gjengangere i tradisjon og historie from 2002. He also contributed text to the comic series Smørbukk and Tuss og Troll, and translated the Belgian comic strips Spirou & Fantasio and Marsupilami into Norwegian language.

In 2014 he was awarded the Rff prize from Rådet for folkemusikk og folkedans, a subsidiary of Arts Council Norway, for his contributions to Norsk visearkiv.

== Death ==
Espeland died in Oslo on 10 January 2024, at the age of 78.
