= Turid Karlsen Seim =

Turid Karlsen Seim (8 October 1945 – 3 November 2016) was a Norwegian doctor of theology from 1991 until her death, the professor of New Testament theology at the University of Oslo.

== Biography ==
Seim was born at Bergen, Norway. Seim was a cand.theol. from the Faculty of Theology, University of Oslo, in 1970. She taught religion at Volda gymnasium, was a research fellow from the Norwegian Public Science Research Council 1979 to 1981 and research assistant at the Faculty of Theology, University of Oslo from 1982. From 1986 was an assistant professor at the Faculty of Theology, University of Oslo. In 1990, the first Norwegian woman to earn a theological doctorate. She was, in the same year, the first woman dean of the University of Oslo. From 1991 onward, she was a professor of theology for the New Testament at the Faculty of Theology. From 2007 to 2015, she was Head of the Norwegian Institute in Rome.

Seim had key positions in national and international ecumenical work. She was a member of the World Council of Churches commission of Faith and Order from 1991 and member of the International Roman Catholic/Lutheran dialogue from 1995. From 1997 to 2001, she was head of the Board of Culture and Social Research Council. She has written books and articles on New Testament themes. She became a member of the Norwegian Academy of Science and Letters in 2009. In 2015, she was awarded the Ecumenical Prize (Økumenikkprisen) by the Christian Council of Norway.

She died in Oslo on 3 November 2016 after an 18-month battle with cancer.
