= Eva Bugge =

Norwegian diplomat (born 1945)

Eva Bugge (born 24 May 1945) is a Norwegian diplomat.

She is a cand.mag. by education, and started working for the Norwegian Ministry of Foreign Affairs in 1974. She served as deputy under-secretary of state in the Ministry of Foreign Affairs from 1996 to 2001, was the Norwegian ambassador to Italy from 2001 to 2006 and to the Netherlands from 2006 to 2011. She spent one last year serving as a special adviser in the Ministry of Foreign Affairs until 2012.
