= Liv Gjølstad =

Norwegian judge (born 1945)

Justice of the Supreme Court of Norway
- In office 1988–2015
- Monarch: Harald V

Personal details
- Born: January 9, 1945 Tønsberg, Vestfold, Norway
- Spouse: Thorbjørn Gjølstad
- Education: University of Oslo
- Awards: Commander of the Order of St. Olav

Liv Gjølstad (born 9 January 1945) is a Norwegian judge.

She was born in Tønsberg. She graduated with the cand.jur. degree from the University of Oslo in 1969. She worked under the Norwegian Parliamentary Ombudsman from 1971, as a presiding judge in Eidsivating from 1983 and as Supreme Court Justice from 1988 to 2015.

She has also been a board member of the Norwegian Nuclear Energy Safety Authority from 1990 to 1992, deputy board member of the Norwegian Public Service Pension Fund from 1993 to 1996 and council member of the Labour Court of Norway.

She is married to bureaucrat Thorbjørn Gjølstad.
