= Elisabeth Haarr =

Norwegian artist (1945–2025)

- Born: 30 January 1945; Hamar, German-occupied Norway
- Died: 4 January 2025 (aged 79); Kristiansand, Norway
- Known for: Textile art

Elisabeth Astrup Haarr (30 January 1945 – 4 January 2025) was a Norwegian artist. Haarr is known for her textile works, which often take the form of sculptures or installations.

== Background ==
Haarr was born on 30 January 1945 in Hamar, Norway. She attended the Statens Håndverks- og Kunstindustriskole from 1964 through 1967.

On 4 January 2025, it was announced that Haarr had died at the age of 78.

== Style and themes ==
Haarr's woven works incorporate a variety of techniques from pre-Columbian through Bauhaus (particularly Anni Albers) and rya rug weaving. She includes non-traditional materials such as grocery bags and other types of plastic, nylon and polyester in her work. Her work often have political themes such as the place of women in Norway and the fight against oppression.

Haarr's first solo exhibition was in 1973 at the Oslo Art Association after exhibiting in an experimental textile biennial in Spain. She went on to have solo exhibitions at the Asker museum, Tromsø Kunstforenin, Bodø Kunstforening, Ålesund Kunstforening, and Unge Kunstneres Samfunn.

== Collections ==
Her work is included in the collections of the National Museum of Art, Architecture and Design, Oslo, the National Museum of Decorative Arts, Trondheim and the Norwegian Crafts Foundation. Her public works include pieces at the University of Tromsø, Roskilde University, and the Norwegian Cultural Council.
