= Inger Prebensen =

Norwegian jurist and banker (born 1945)

Inger Elisabeth Prebensen
- Born: 11 January 1945 (age 81); Oslo, Norway
- Education: University of Oslo
- Occupation: Banker

Inger Elisabeth Prebensen (born 11 January 1945) is a Norwegian jurist and banker.

== Biography ==
Prebensen was born in Oslo on 11 January 1945. She is a daughter of Rolf Pedersen (1907–79) and Anna Margaretha Melhuus (1910–79). Her first marriage to Christopher Fougner Prebensen was dissolved in 1985, when she married Ole Pedersen.

She graduated in jurisprudence from the University of Oslo in 1973.

She has been director of the Norwegian Guarantee Institute for Export Credits, Kjøbmandsbanken, and Norges Postsparebank. She later had leading positions in the International Monetary Fund.
