= Rune Johan Andersson =

Norwegian illustrator and writer (born 1945)

- Born: 5 March 1945 (age 80)
- Occupations: cartoonist, illustrator and children’s writer

Rune Johan Andersson (born 5 March 1945) is a Norwegian cartoonist, illustrator and children's writer.

From 1970 to 1984 he worked as illustrator for the newspaper Dagbladet, and later for Aftenposten. Among his books are Glemmeboken from 2001, Rottenes plan og andre forunderlige fabler from 2003, and Ørkensang from 2012. He is represented at the National Gallery of Norway, Riksgalleriet and other art galleries.

== Awards ==
- 1979: Kultur- og kirkedepartementets tegneseriepris for barne- og ungdomslitteratur (culture and church department's cartoon prize for children's and youth literature) for Paradox, with Jon Bing and Tor Åge Bringsværd
- 2005: Riksmålsforbundets barne- og ungdomsbokpris for barneboka for Post (Children and youth book prize)
