= Aks 13000 =

Aks 130000 or Aks 13 was a sabotage squad which existed from 1944 to 1945, during parts of the occupation of Norway by Nazi Germany in World War II. It was a part of the Norwegian resistance movement, specifically Milorg.

"Aks" was short for Aksjonsgruppe—"group of action". Milorg had no such group for the first years of its existence, and on occasions it had to rely on the Osvald Group to perform important missions. Aks 13000 was created in August 1944 when Svein Blindheim was appointed as chief of sabotage missions in Milorg's District 13 (D13). Blindheim was later succeeded by William Houlder. Knut Egil Nordahl was the substitute leader during Houlder's absence in March and April 1945. The second-in-command remained the same throughout the period: Per Røed. Important aides-de-camp and orderlies were Arvid Hansen, Joar Olsen, Arnfinn Salveson, Finn Gjestvold, Kåre Thoresen, Reidar Andersen and Knut Valstad. Sabotage team leaders were Kjell Bull-Hansen (who died and was replaced by Odd Isøy), Richard Andvord, Rolv Enge, Jan Müller, Thor Hammerstrøm, Oddvar Felumb, Hermann Høst, Ola Tyvold, Hjalmar Munthe-Kaas Lund and Øystein Jensen. They had several important cooperators among the civil populace, first and foremost physician Per Giertsen, in addition to people who supplied cover-up apartments and other protection, among them Ørnulf Bast.

Aks 13000 was the most important sabotage group in Norway in the occupation's latter phase, together with Pellegruppa and Oslogjengen. The members of Aks 13000 performed about 100 missions of sabotage, explosion or theft. The first mission was an assault on the gasoline depot at Bygdøy on 31 August 1944. The most active person was Per Røed, although he sometimes oversaw missions instead of seeing violent action. The most active saboteur was Odd Isøy.

The hardest blow to the organization was dealt in February and March 1945. In a coincidental interception of a sabotage planning meeting in February, Gestapo killed Adolf Bogstad and arrested Storm Weinholdt and Frank Olsen. They proceeded to kill Arvid Hansen and arrest Erik Bruun, Henry Gundersen, Kåre Olafsen and Kjell Ramberg on the same evening. The next day Joar Olsen was killed by Statspolitiet. All these arrested persons were executed on 17 March 1945. Only one week later, on 24 March 1945, Kjell Bull-Hansen and Odd Isøy were captured by coincidence; Isøy managed to escape whereas Bull-Hansen was killed escaping. Other personnel, including William Houlder and Per Røed, were wounded during Aks 13000's existence.
