= Giertsen =

Giertsen is a surname. Notable people with the surname include:

- Per Giertsen (1906–1990), Norwegian physician and resistance member
- Robert Giertsen (1894–1978), Norwegian sailor
- Thomas Giertsen (born 1971), Norwegian producer, stand-up comedian, and actor
