= Rolv Enge =

Norwegian resistance member and architect

Rolv Øistein Enge (29 June 1921 – 5 April 2014) was a Norwegian resistance member and architect.

== World War II ==
During the occupation of Norway by Nazi Germany, he became involved in Milorg. He formed a group called Barlindgjengen (the "Yew Gang"), originally consisting of men from Jar in Bærum. In May 1944 the gang was summoned for sabotage training under the leadership of Per Røed; the camp was in Bærumsmarka. The gang became incorporated into District 13's sabotage squad Aks 13000, where Enge came to serve as one of several team leaders. In the first sabotage mission where Enge participated, however, Per Røed was the team leader. The mission took place on 31 August 1944, and consisted of blowing up 3,000 litres of gasoline stored at Bygdøy's primary school. This was the first ever mission of Aks 13000.

In addition to Røed and Enge, the participants were Kjell Werenskiold, Kjell Moursund and Kåre Thoresen. They brought 8 kilograms (18 lb) of plastic explosives, but three of the five were to serve as guards, scattered along the route the saboteurs took to Bygdøy School. Enge was the guard stationed closest to the gasoline tanks, whereas Røed and Thoresen placed the explosives. When they retreated, they had 25 minutes before detonation. It turned out that the intelligence was slightly wrong in that 3,000 litres were stored here; this had in fact been increased to 6,000.

Enge also participated in the failed mission against gasoline tanks at Vestheim School on 14 September 1944. No sabotage damage was dealt, and Aks 13000 nearly lost one saboteur—the first injury sustained during the squad's short history—but the injured saboteur, Reidar Smith, was treated by physician Per Giertsen. Enge and Røed later returned, hurled six one-kilo loads of plastic over the fence at Vestheim School and managed to blow up seventeen tanks of gasoline.

In October 1944, Aks 13000 prepared for a mission towards a gasoline depot in Hakadal. Explosives were airdropped, and Enge and Røed brought the gear to Jar. On 13 October, a team of saboteurs travelled by train from Oslo Østbanestasjon, divided in three groups. Enge travelled together with Torgils Oldgard; the second group was Røed and Werenskiold; the third group was Smith, Moursund and Ragnar Sune. The three groups left the train at Hakadal Station, went into the forest and met there. The target depot was located at a side track north of Elnes Station. Enge had to guard a team of seven timbermen who worked in the area, so he did not participate in the actual placing of the explosives. At 21:24, the sabotage team left the area, and between 21:25 and 22:30, all the designated targets, 86 tank railcars, exploded.

He was decorated with the Defence Medal 1940–1945 and the St. Olav's Medal with Two Oak Branches.

== Post-war life ==
Enge, who had taken the examen artium in 1942 before joining the resistance movement, took higher education in the United States after the war. He did so on a scholarship from Leif Tronstad's heritage fund. He took the bachelor of architecture degree at the University of Pennsylvania and the master of architecture degree at the University of Southern California. He was a member of the fraternities Tau Sigma Delta and Alpha Rho Chi. After taking his education he worked at Pennsylvania State University as assisting professor for some time, and also worked in various architect's offices in the US and Norway. In 1968 he was hired in the Norwegian Defence Estates Agency, and he retired in 1988. From 1974 to 1976 he worked in Zambia for Norconsult.

He has resided at Jar in his later life, but later moved to Hosle. He died in April 2014.
