= Henry Gundersen =

Norwegian resistance member (1920–1945)

Henry Gundersen (3 March 1920 – 17 March 1945) was a Norwegian resistance member who was executed during the occupation of Norway by Nazi Germany.

He was born in Glemmen, and lived in Oslo. He was educated at the Norwegian National Academy of Craft and Art Industry, and worked at the Norwegian Mapping and Cadastre Authority, then known as Norges Geografiske Oppmåling. During the occupation of Norway by Nazi Germany, he became involved in Milorg, and was involved in several sabotage missions. His last mission was Aksjon smør, in which Milorg men stole foodstuffs from two warehouses, one in the street Tollbugata belonging to German forces, and one in the street Skippergata belonging to Arbeidstjenesten. The foodstuffs were distributed to Milorg men who hid in the forests surrounding Oslo.

He was arrested by Gestapo on 13 February 1945, during a crackdown which began when two Gestapo officers intercepted a resistance meeting in Storm Weinholdt's home. Storm Weinholdt and Frank Olsen were arrested, and Adolf Bogstad was killed. Gundersen was sentenced to death on 15 March in an SS court-martial; prosecutor was Siegfried Fehmer. He and several others were executed by gunshot at Akershus Fortress on 17 March. This was the second to last execution of Norwegians by Germans during the war; the last person was an SS-Jäger executed for desertion (Fahnenflucht) on 19 April.

Together with eight other resistance members—Adolf Bogstad, Erik Bruun, Arvid Hansen, Ingolf Nordstrøm, Kåre Olafsen, Frank Olsen, Kjell Ramberg and Storm Weinholdt—he is commemorated with a memorial stone at Sarabråten in Østmarka.
