= Arvid Hansen =

Norwegian resistance member (1916–1945)

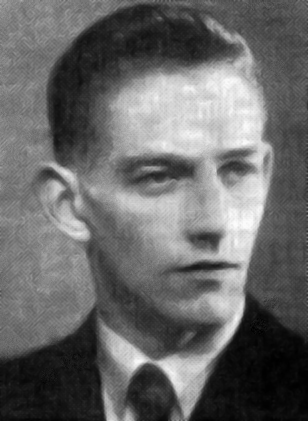
Arvid Hansen motstandsmann

Arvid Hansen (1 March 1916 – 13 February 1945) was a Norwegian resistance member who was executed during the occupation of Norway by Nazi Germany.

He was born in Oslo as the son of Harald and Helga Marie Hansen. He worked in Oslo as an electrician. When Norway was invaded by Germany in 1940, he became involved in the subsequent fighting. He later involved himself in the illegal press, and later in Milorg. He conducted several sabotage missions as a part of the group D.B. He was also a part of the group Aks 13000. His last mission was Aksjon smør, in which Milorg men stole foodstuffs from two warehouses, one in the street Tollbugata belonging to German forces, and one in the street Skippergata belonging to Arbeidstjenesten. The foodstuffs were distributed to Milorg men who hid in the forests surrounding Oslo. This was his 28th sabotage mission.

On 13 February 1945, the day after Aksjon smør, two Gestapo officers by coincidence intercepted a resistance meeting in Storm Weinholdt's home. Storm Weinholdt and Frank Olsen were arrested, and Adolf Bogstad was killed. This kickstarted a crackdown in which several people were arrested. Four Nazis then stormed Hansen's home just before midnight on 13 February 1945. They rang the doorbell, and shot Arvid Hansen's father Harald who answered at the door. Almost immediately they met Arvid Hansen, who was in his bedroom. Hansen managed to fire three shots and kill one of the Nazis, but when firing for a second time, he was himself hit and instantly killed. His fiancée, Nelly Minge, who had been assisting in the resistance work, was wounded. His mother survived, and fled to Sweden the next week.

Together with eight other resistance members—Adolf Bogstad, Erik Bruun, Henry Gundersen, Ingolf Nordstrøm, Kåre Olafsen, Frank Olsen, Kjell Ramberg and Storm Weinholdt—he is commemorated with a memorial stone at Sarabråten in Østmarka.
