= Erik Skogstrøm =

Norwegian newspaper editor

Erik Fillip Skogstrøm (15 May 1926 – 19 April 2014) was a Norwegian newspaper editor.

He was born in Glemmen, and became a journalist in Fredriksstad Blad in 1947. He was promoted to editor-in-chief in 1971, and remained so until 1991. Skogstrøm chaired the regional Norwegian Union of Journalists chapter from 1955 to 1964 and the regional Association of Editors chapter from 1977 to 1980. He has been a board member of Høyres Pressebyrå and Norpress, and a deputy board member of the Norwegian News Agency.
