= Storm Weinholdt =

Norwegian resistance member (1920–1945)

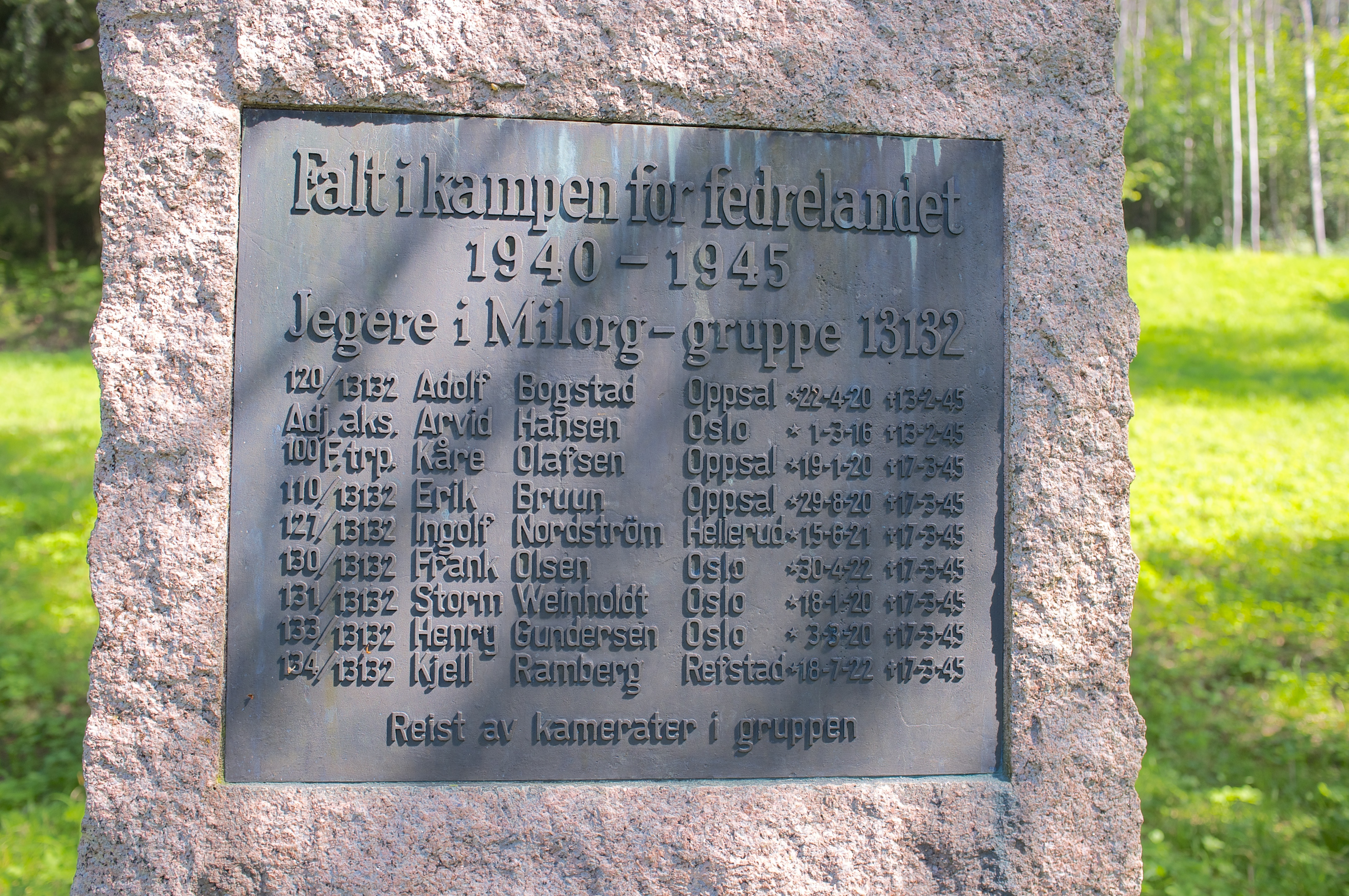
From the Memorial site at Sarabråten, Østmarka. The text reads: "Fallen in the fight for the fatherland 1940 - 1945, Hunters in Milorg group 13132... Storm Weinholdt, Oslo"

Storm Willads Weinholdt (11 January 1920 – 17 March 1945) was a Norwegian resistance member who was executed during the occupation of Norway by Nazi Germany.

He was born and lived in Oslo, at Kampen. During the German World War II occupation of Norway, he became involved in Milorg, and was the deputy leader of District 13. On 13 February 1945, Weinholdt was going to plan a sabotage action, in his own home together with Adolf Bogstad and Frank Olsen. Before either of the three arrived, two Gestapo officers, one German and one Norwegian, arrived in the Weinholdt family's home to check on Storm's brother Kjell. As Kjell was not home either, the Gestapo officers waited in the living room. Bogstad and Storm Weinholdt soon arrived, and while the Gestapo officers became suspicious of the rendez-vous, the men stated that they were planning an outdoors trip. They were searched, and knew that they had to leave before Frank Olsen showed up, as Olsen carried important documents which would compromise them. When Olsen did arrive, the Gestapo officers understood the situation. After Adolf Bogstad tried to escape and was killed, Storm Weinholdt was arrested together with his father, his brother Kjell who also had arrived, and Frank Olsen. They were subject to torture at Møllergata 19. Storm Weinholdt was sentenced to death on 15 March in an SS court-martial; the prosecutor was Siegfried Fehmer. He was shot at Akershus Fortress on 17 March. His body was lowered in the Oslofjord. This was the second-to-last execution of Norwegians by Germans during the war; the last person was an SS-Jäger executed for desertion (Fahnenflucht) on 19 April.

Together with eight other resistance members—Adolf Bogstad, Erik Bruun, Henry Gundersen, Arvid Hansen, Ingolf Nordstrøm, Kåre Olafsen, Frank Olsen and Kjell Ramberg—he is commemorated with a memorial stone at Sarabråten in Østmarka.

His brother Kjell survived the war, being incarcerated at Møllergata 19 until 11 April, then at Grini concentration camp until the war's end. Sverre Weinholdt was incarcerated at Møllergata 19 until 22 March, then at Grini until the war's end.
