= SNCF Class 141R =

French 2-8-2 steam locomotive

SNCF 141.R
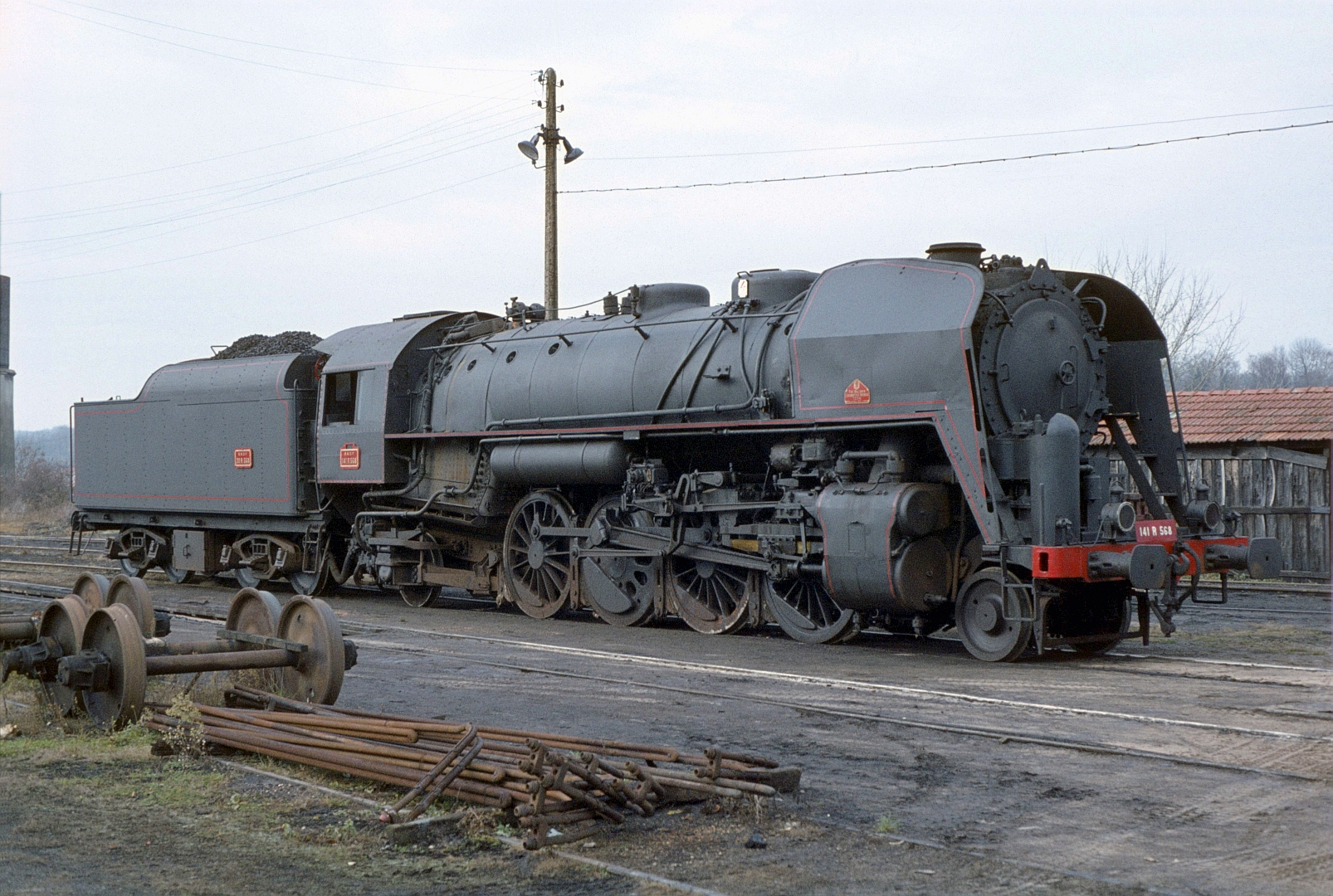
- 141 R 568 at Gray on 1981-11-27
Type and origin
- Power type: Steam
- Builder: ALCO; Baldwin Locomotive Works; Lima Locomotive Works; CLC; Montreal Locomotive Works
- Build date: 1945-1947
- Total produced: 1340
Specifications
- Configuration
  - Whyte: 2-8-2
  - UIC: 1′D1′ h2
- Gauge: 4 ft 8 1/2 in (1,435 mm) standard gauge
- Driver dia.: 1.65 m (65 in)
- Length: 14.64 m (48 ft 0 in) (loco only); 24.13 m (79 ft 2 in) (total)
- Loco weight: 115.5 t (113.7 long tons; 127.3 short tons) (coal loco); 116.25 t (114.41 long tons; 128.14 short tons) (oil loco)
- Tender weight: 75 t (74 long tons; 83 short tons) (30.R tender)
- Fuel type: Coal or fuel oil
- Firebox
  - Grate area: 5.2 m^{2} (56 sq ft)
- Boiler pressure: 1.55 MPa (225 psi)
- Cylinders: Two, outside
- Cylinder size: 597 mm × 711 mm (23.5 in × 28.0 in)
Performance figures
- Maximum speed: 100 km/h (62 mph)
- Power output: 2.154 MW (2,889 hp) at 80 km/h (50 mph)
- Tractive effort: 202.4 kN (45,500 lbf)

The SNCF 141 R is a class of 2-8-2 steam locomotives of the Société Nationale des Chemins de fer Français (French State Railways). They were used all over the French rail network from 1945 to 1974.

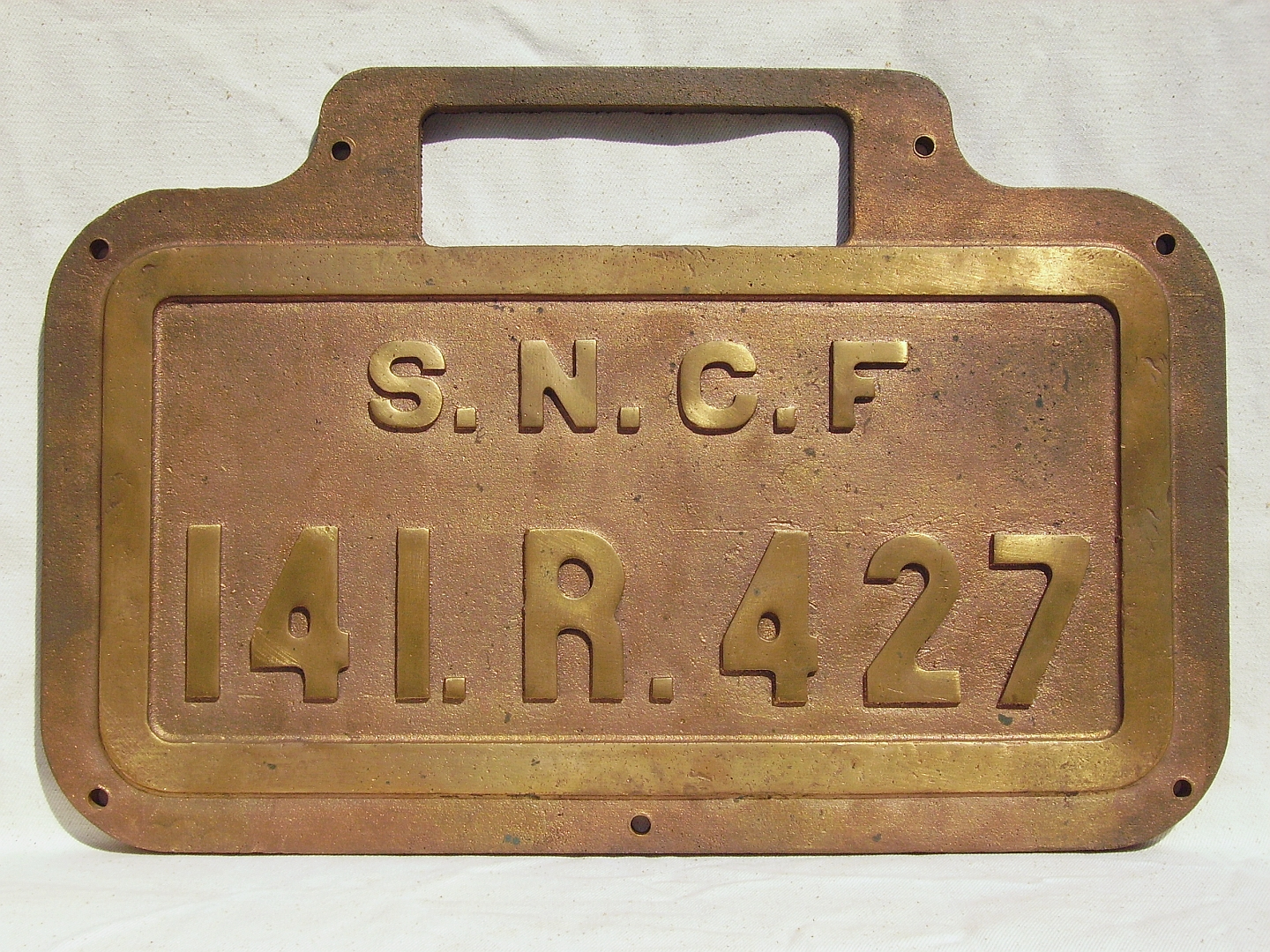
Cab side numberplate from locomotive 141.R.427

== History ==
At the end of World War II, there was a shortage of locomotives, and to quickly obtain the large number needed locomotives were ordered from the main American and Canadian locomotive builders under the Lend-Lease Program (and not the Marshall Plan, signed in April 1948, as often written).

The design was based on the Green Bay & Western Railroad's successfully customised Mikados, based somewhat on the USRA Light Mikado, suitably modified to meet the SNCF loading gauge. Modifications included the overall height, the fitting of European couplers and buffers, left-hand drive, smoke deflectors (to a unique and instantly recognisable style) and a Kylchap exhaust on the second batch.

The first order for 700 engines was placed in February 1945 with production split between the "big three" American locomotive builders: Baldwin Locomotive Works, Philadelphia, Pennsylvania, American Locomotive Company, Schenectady, New York, and Lima Locomotive Works, Lima, Ohio. Once financing was made available, the second batch of 640 engines was ordered from the "big three", plus the Canadian manufacturers Montreal Locomotive Works, Montreal Quebec and Canadian Locomotive Company, Kingston, Ontario. Most of this batch were built as oil burners, burning preheated heavy fuel oil (known in French as 'Mazout'), unlike the first batch which had all been designed as coal fired.

The massive introduction of oil fired locomotives was due to the fact that in the immediate post-war period, the quality coal was in high demand and SNCF was consuming 9 million tons per annum. Oil thus allowed savings in coal, even if in many depots it required a revolution in working conditions. The extra range permitted by oil—700 km (435 mi) instead of 400 km (250 mi)—explains also the more intensive use of the locomotives. The enginemen nicknamed the locomotives mazoutières or charbonnières ("coal-scuttles") according to fuel employed; oil-burners were also called les goudronneuses ("tar spraying machines") by their crews.

Builder	Serial number	Quantity	SNCF number
Lima Locomotive Works	8867–9046	180	141 R 1 – 141.R.180
American Locomotive Company	74054–74313	260	141 R 181 – 141.R.440
Baldwin Locomotive Works	72254–72513	260	141 R 441 – 141 R 700
Baldwin Locomotive Works	72699–72763	65	141 R 701 – 141 R 765
Baldwin Locomotive Works	72857–72897	41	141 R 766 – 141 R 806
Baldwin Locomotive Works	72928–72981	54	141 R 807 – 141 R 860
American Locomotive Company	73934–74053	120	141 R 861 – 141 R 980
American Locomotive Company	74833–74872	40	141 R 981 – 141 R 1020
Lima Locomotive Works	9112–9211	100	141 R 1021 – 141 R 1120
American Locomotive Company	74916–74955	40	141 R 1121 – 141 R 1160
Baldwin Locomotive Works	72982–73017	36	141 R 1161 – 141 R 1196
Baldwin Locomotive Works	73046–73049	4	141 R 1197 – 141 R 1200
Montreal Locomotive Works	75010–75109	100	141 R 1201 – 141 R 1300
Canadian Locomotive Company	2368–2407	40	141 R 1301 – 141 R 1340

After the second world war, the American manufacturers' output had been boosted by the war effort. Thus from July 1945 to May 1946 the 700 141 R of the first batch were built in only eleven months. It is possible to observe significant variations in monthly production. Large scale production started in September, and reached its height during October, November, December and January, to slow down in February and March, and to continue until finished in May, or, an average of almost three engines per day! By way of comparison in French locomotives works (French industry having been weakened by the war) it took four years, from June 1948 to July 1952, for the manufacturer Schneider to deliver 35 241 P to the SNCF.

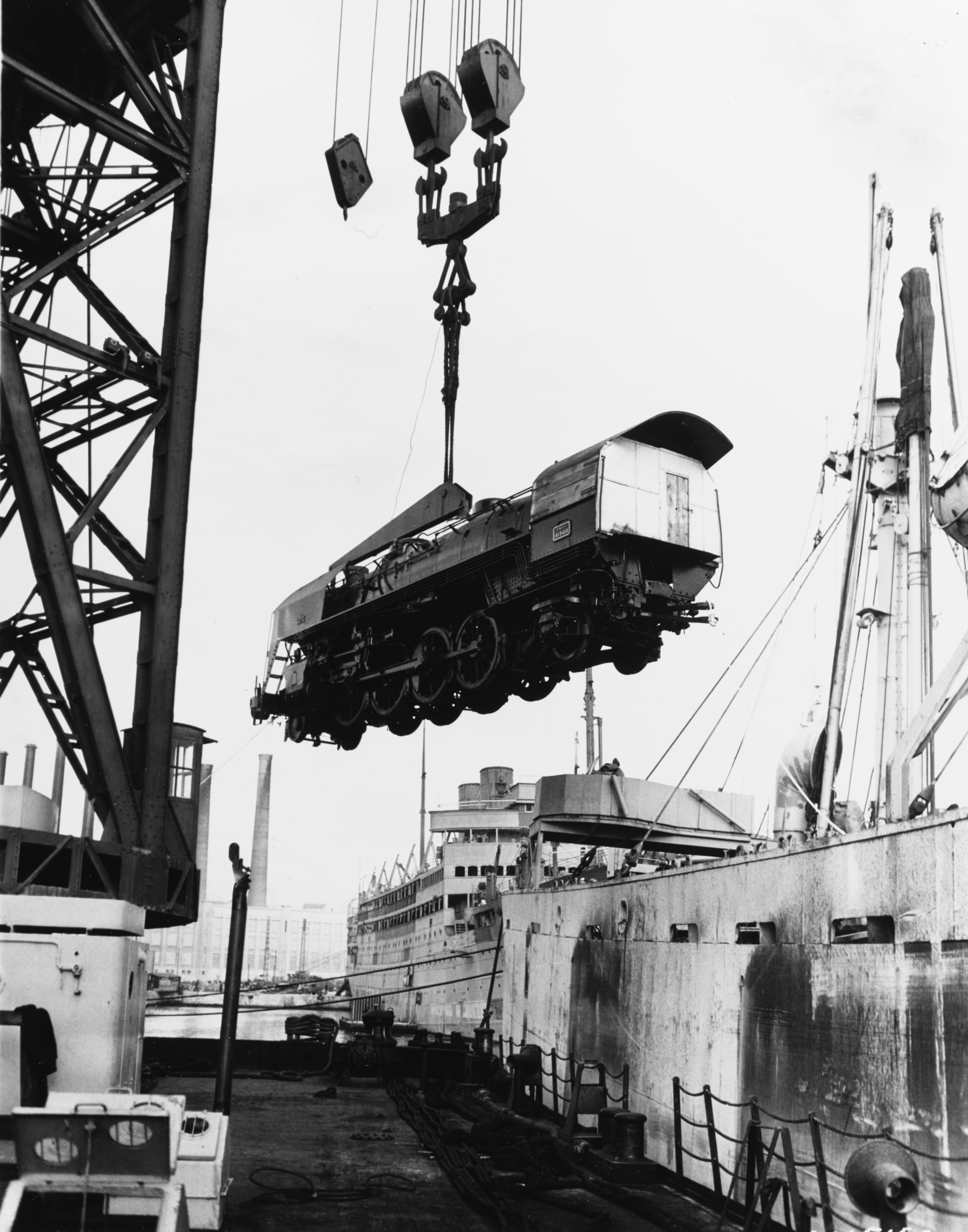
141 R 468 is unloaded from the Liberty ship SS Harold O. Wilson at Marseille, November 1945

The first engine, the 141 R 1 built by Lima, left the workshops on 30 July 1945. The 141 R 466 was the first to be unloaded in France on 17 November 1945, at the port of Marseille. The last of the series, the 141 R 1340, left the workshops of Canadian Locomotive Company in July 1947 and on 5 September was unloaded at the port of Cherbourg. Seventeen engines (the 141 R 1220–1235 and 141 R 1241) were lost at sea when the ship transporting them, the Norwegian ship MS Belpamela sank in a violent storm off Newfoundland on 11 April 1947. So of the 1340 engines initially ordered, only 1323 entered in service on the French network.

For the SNCF, this type of machine constituted a small revolution – with simple expansion and very advanced construction techniques, the 141 R 1101–1340 were the only SNCF steam locomotives equipped with Boxpok wheels, and roller bearings on all the driving and coupled axles, as well as an almost indeformable one-piece cast steel frame. The bar frames and the axle box bearings of 141 R 1–1100, appeared irreproachable, which made them powerful machines but economical to maintain. For 141 R 1101–1340, the maximum mileage run between two main works visits was up to 230,000 kilometres (140,000 mi). Easy to drive, they offered relatively modern comfort for both drivers and firemen. The cabs were fully enclosed, equipped with a comfort and an ergonomic hitherto unknown to SNCF crews. Driving and firing controls were within reach while seated, with automatic coal feeding thanks to the mechanical stoker, and oil-firing was even easier. They were banalisées ("standardised"), that is, not assigned to a particular crew.

On 19 October 1975 the last 141 R in use with the SNCF, 141 R 1187 of Vénissieux depot, worked a special return working between Lyon and Veynes. Four locomotives of Narbonne depot were leased to the Hellenic State Railways from November 1973 to April 1974.

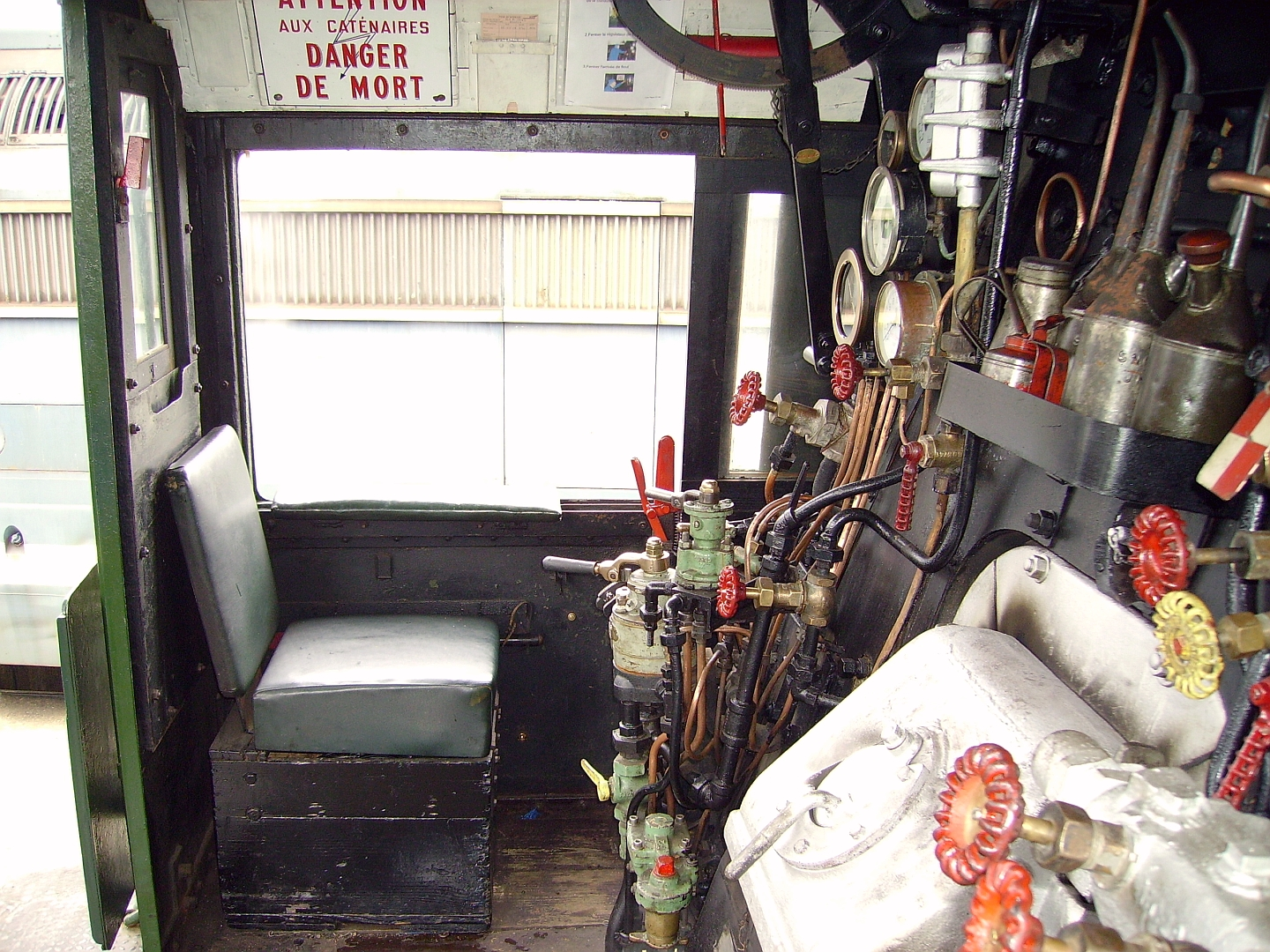
The driver's cab of the 141 R 1199.

== Preserved locomotives ==
Twelve 141.R locomotives have been preserved. Among them, in operating condition are:

- 141 R 420, (coal) based in Clermont-Ferrand, managed by the Sté Civile de Conservation de la 141 R 420.
- 141 R 840, (oil) based in Aubrais-Orléans, managed by the "AAATV" : Amicale des Anciens et Amis de la Traction à Vapeur, section Centre/Val de Loire.
- 141 R 1126, (oil) owned by the SNCF, based in Toulouse, managed by L'Amicale des Cheminots pour la Préservation de la 141 R 1126
- 141 R 1199, (oil) owned by the SNCF, based in Aubrais-Orléans, managed by the "AAATV" : Amicale des Anciens et Amis de la Traction à Vapeur, section Centre/Val de Loire.

These four locomotives are protected as monument historique (national heritage objects).

Five locos are based in Switzerland with two in working order:

- 141 R 568 (coal) ex CITEV. Along with 1244, it has a Long Bell 3-chime whistle but also with the standard short bell 3-chime whistle.
- 141 R 1244 (oil). This is one of the SNCF 141r to have a 3-chime whistle and an additional 5-chime whistle instead of the SNCF's standard single-chime whistle. The other one is 568.

141 R 73, 141 R 1207 and 141 R 1332 have been purchased by the Association 141R568. 141 R 1332 has no boiler, it having been scrapped by the previous owners. The three locomotives were previously in store after the bankruptcy of the company in charge of their restoration.

The three remaining locomotives are all the property of the SNCF and are preserved as static exhibits.

- 141 R 1108 (oil) at Breil-sur-Roya
- 141 R 1187 (oil) at the Cité du train de Mulhouse
- 141 R 1298 (oil) at Miramas

== Image gallery ==
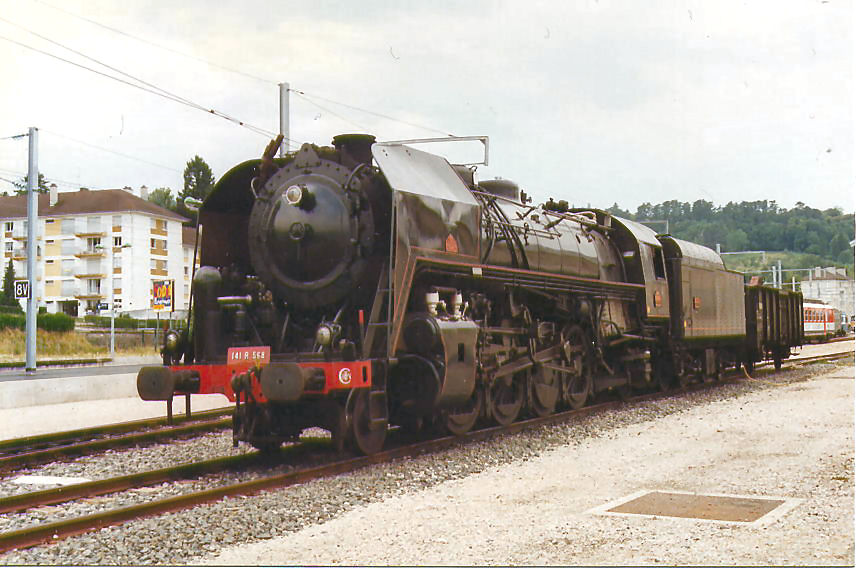
Locomotive 141R568 at Lons-le-Saunier (Jura) station, on 1 August 1996. The locomotive operates on the CITEV tourist line.

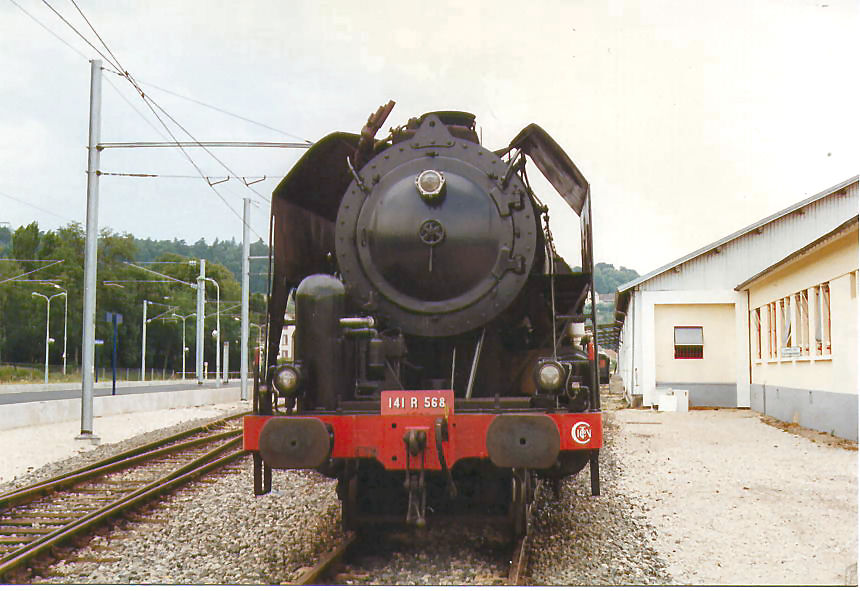
Head-on view of 141.R.568

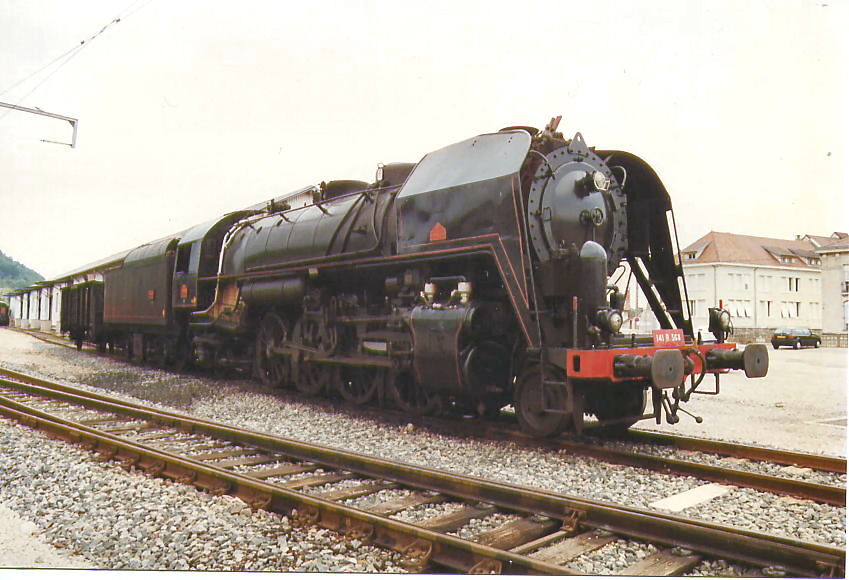
Left three-quarters view of 141.R.568

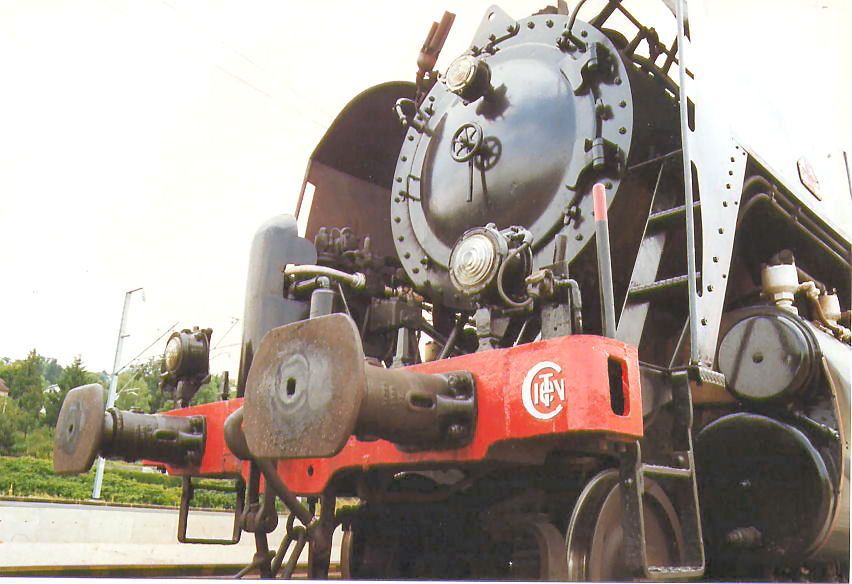
Right quarter view of 141.R.568

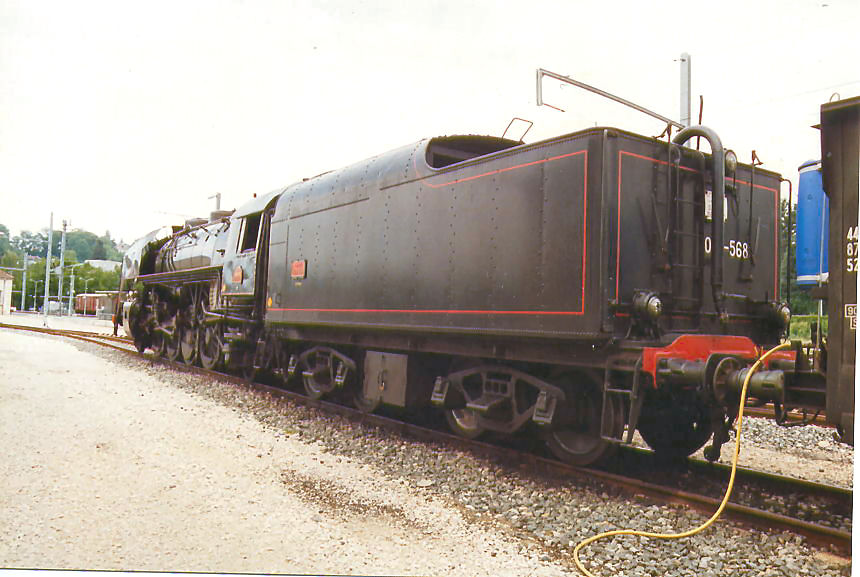
Rear three-quarter view of the tender

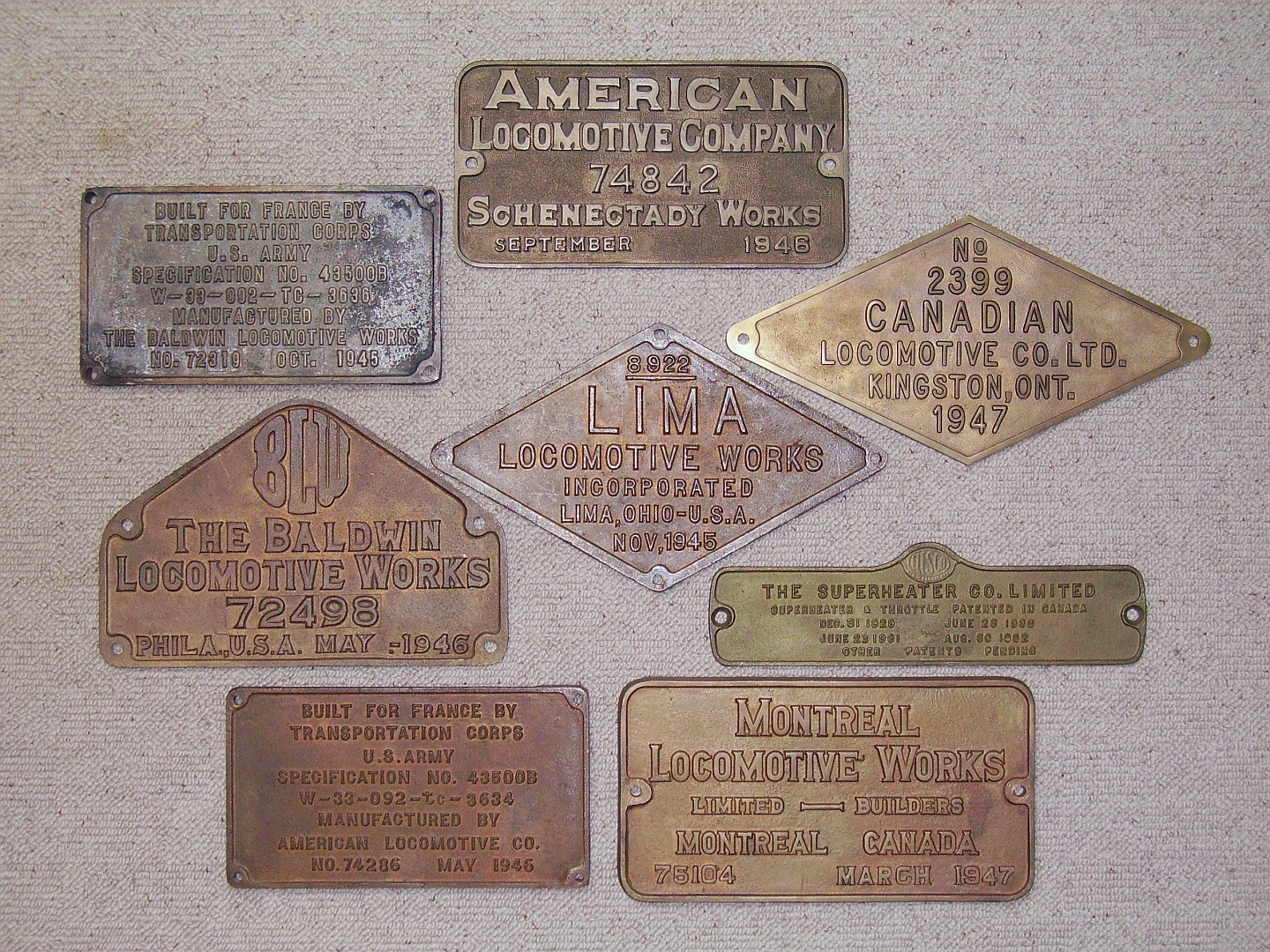
Builder's plates from 141.R locomotives

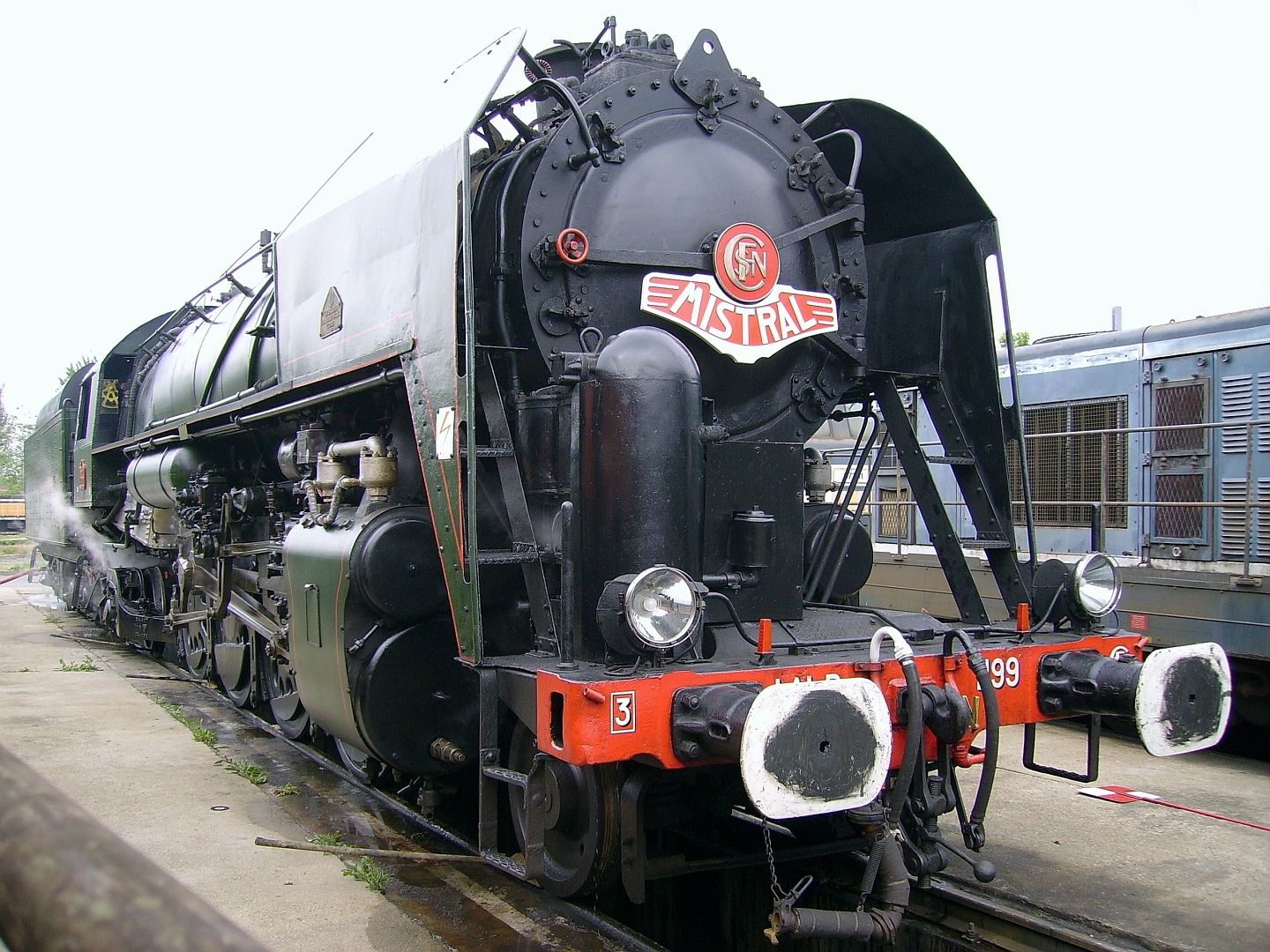
The 141.R.1199 at the Villeneuve-Saint-Georges depot on 5 May 2007.

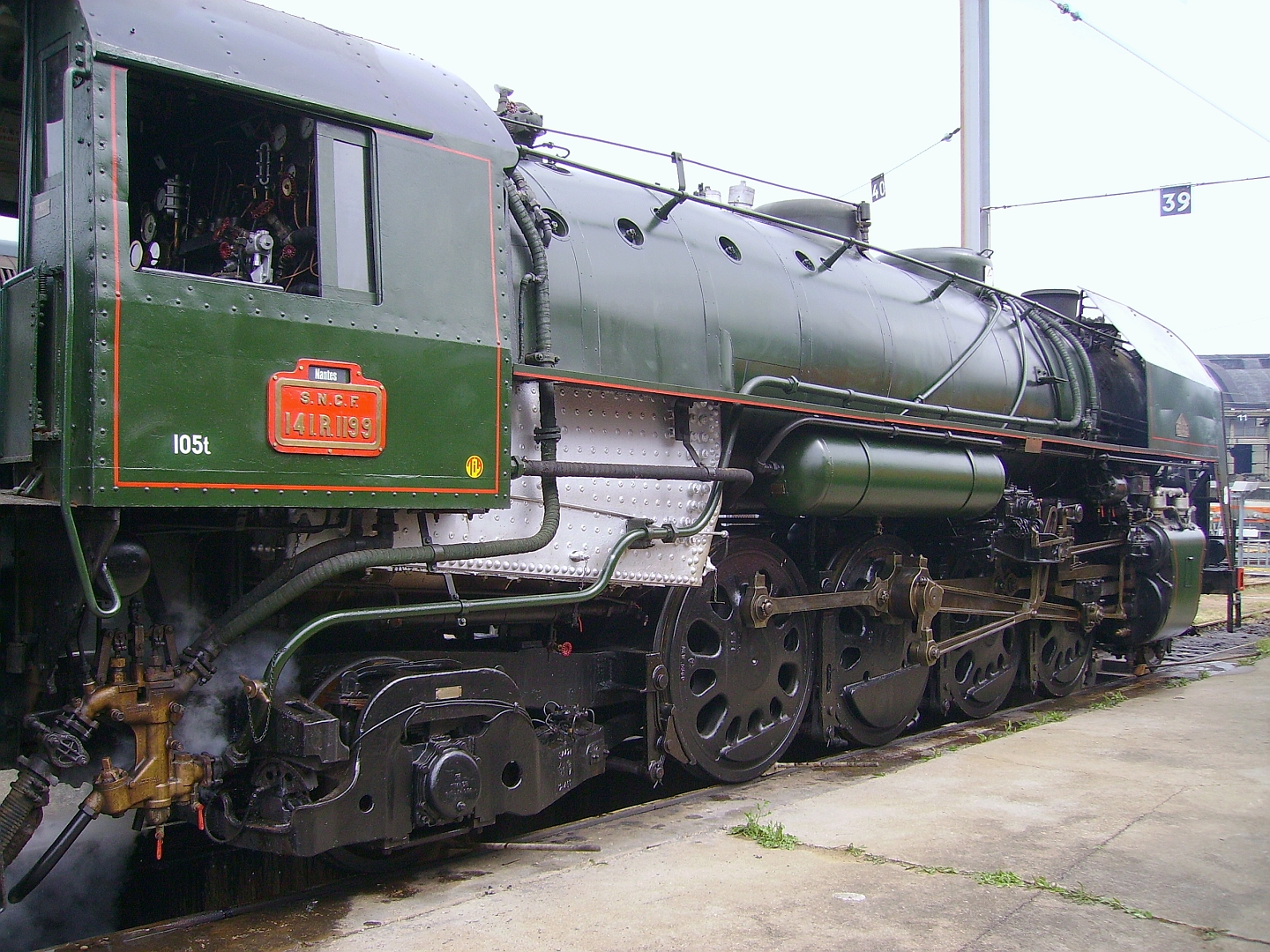
Three-quarter view of the 141.R.1199 (Villeneuve-St-Georges 5 May 2007).

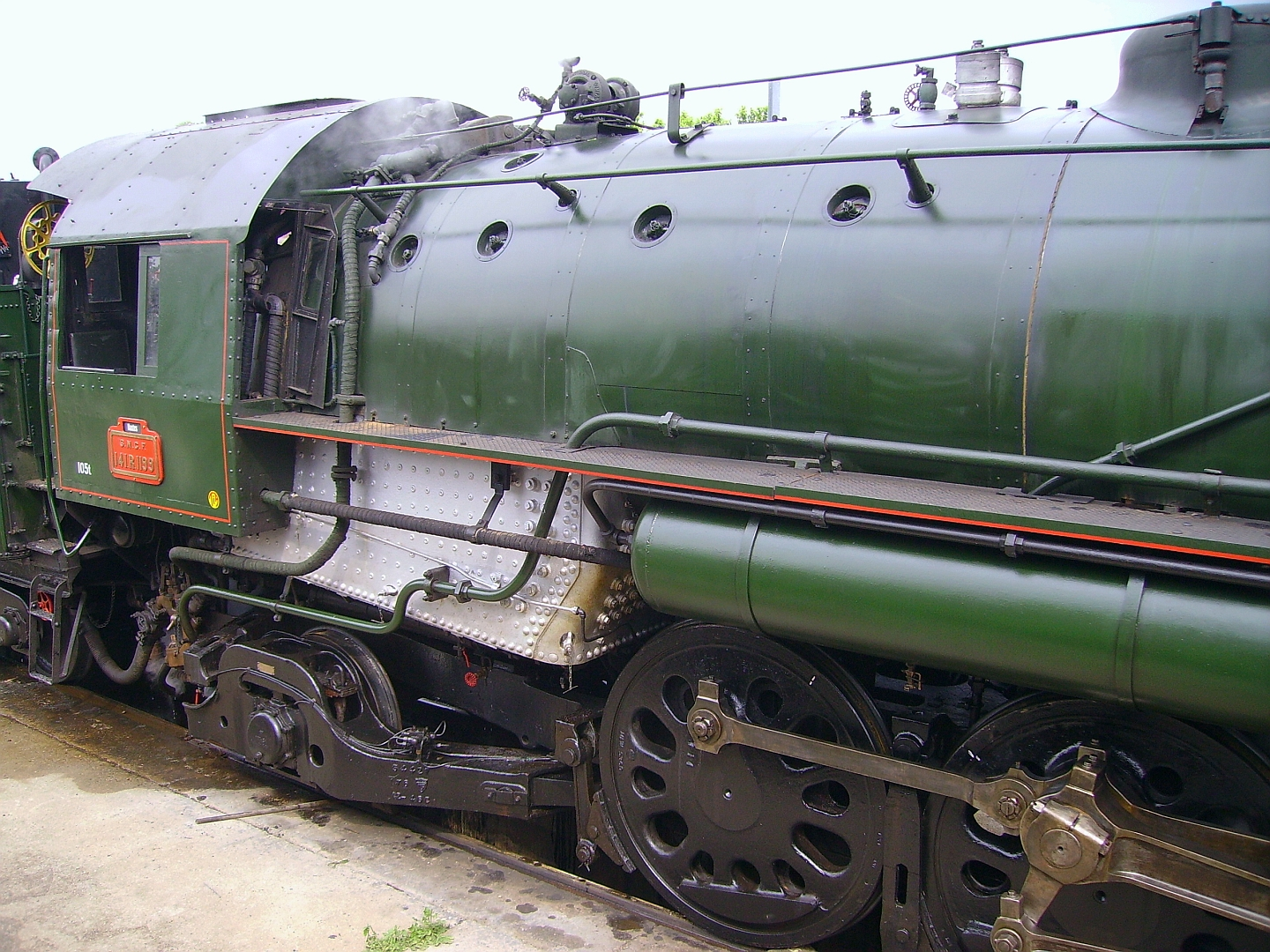
Three-quarter view of the 141.R.1199 (Villeneuve-St-Georges 5 May 2007).

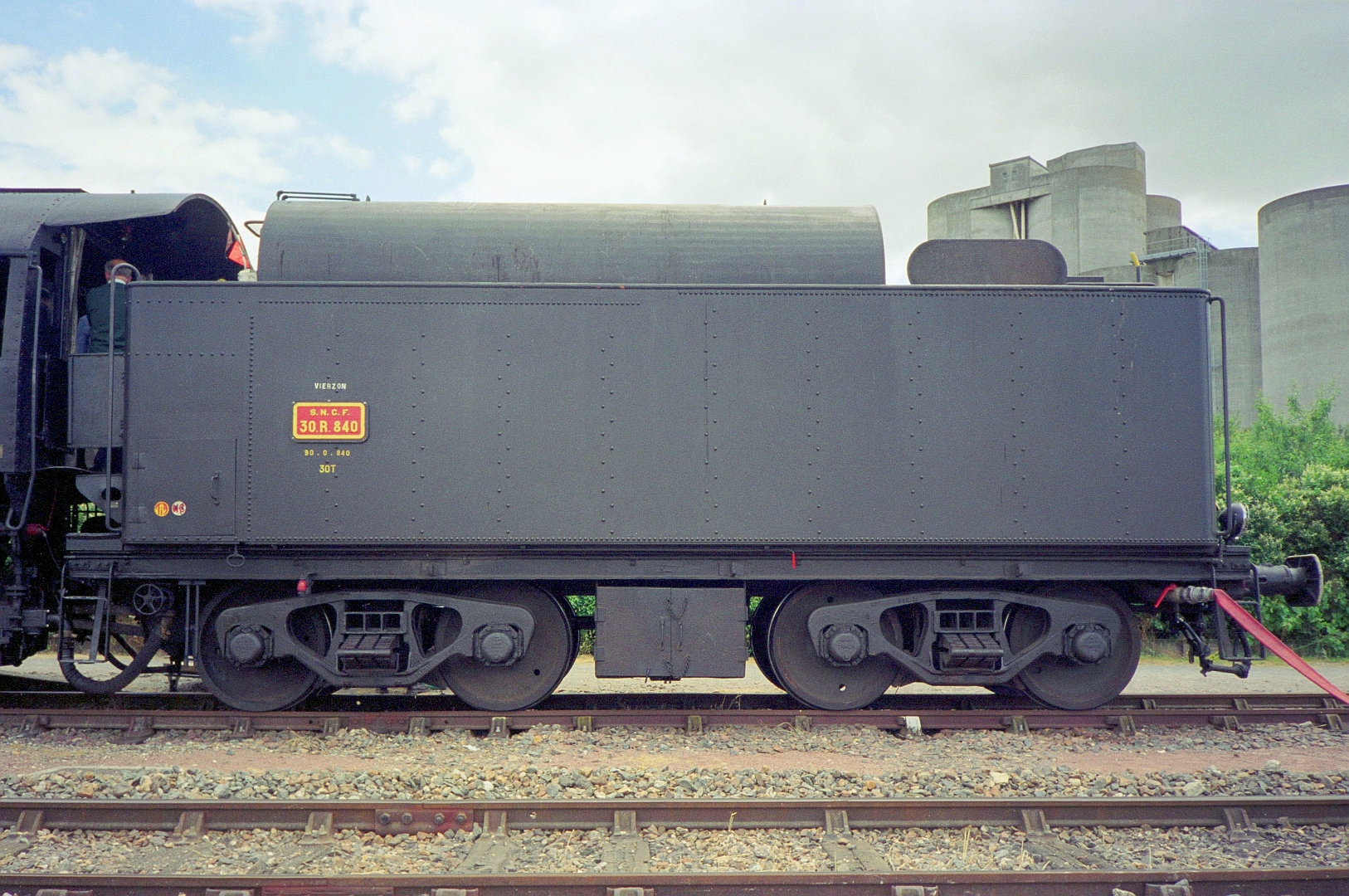
Oil tender 30.R.840. (Pithiviers 25 June 2000).

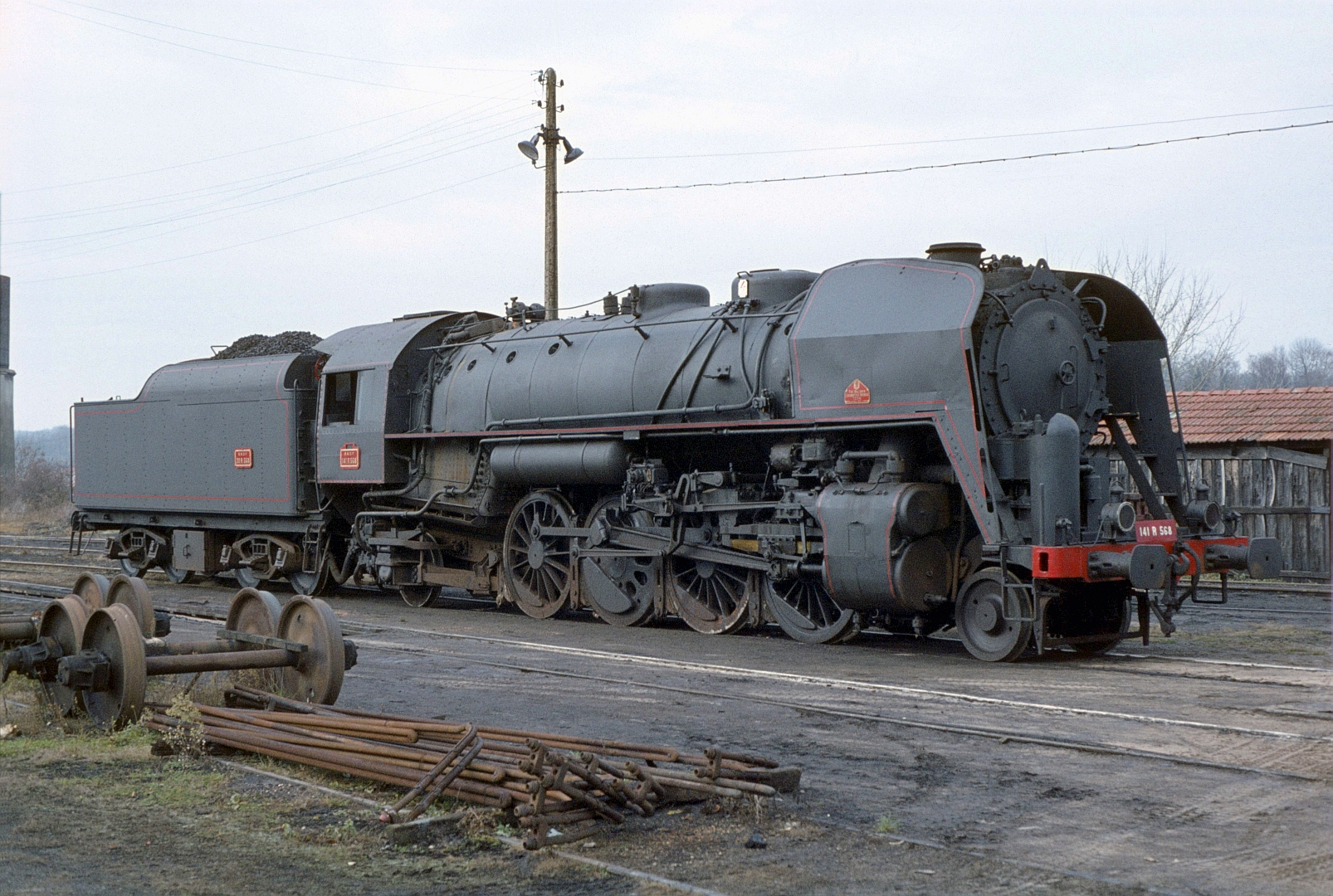
First batch 141.R, the 141.R.568, at Gray, 27 November 1981.

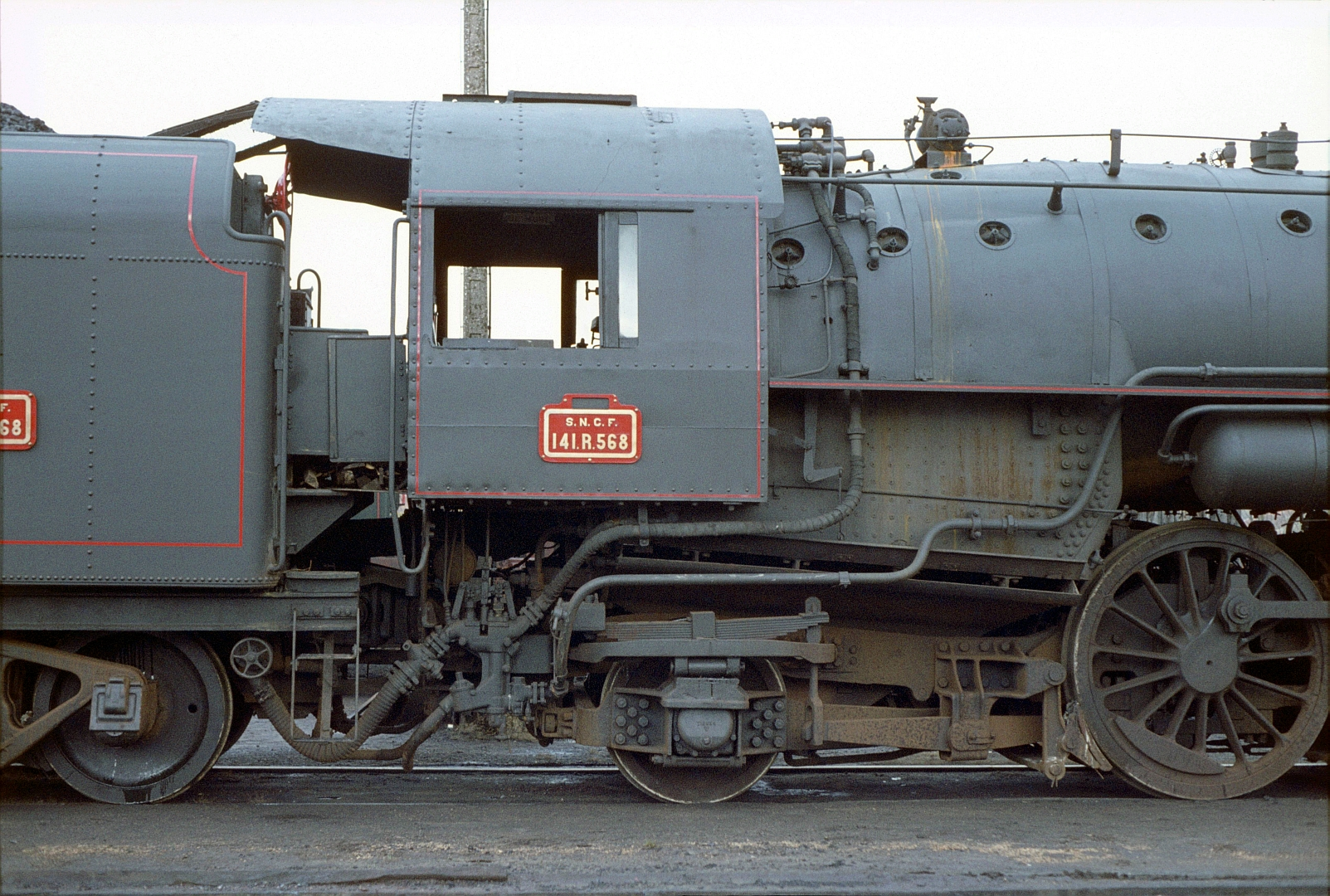
Cab side details of a first batch 141.R (141.R.568, Gray 27 November 1981).

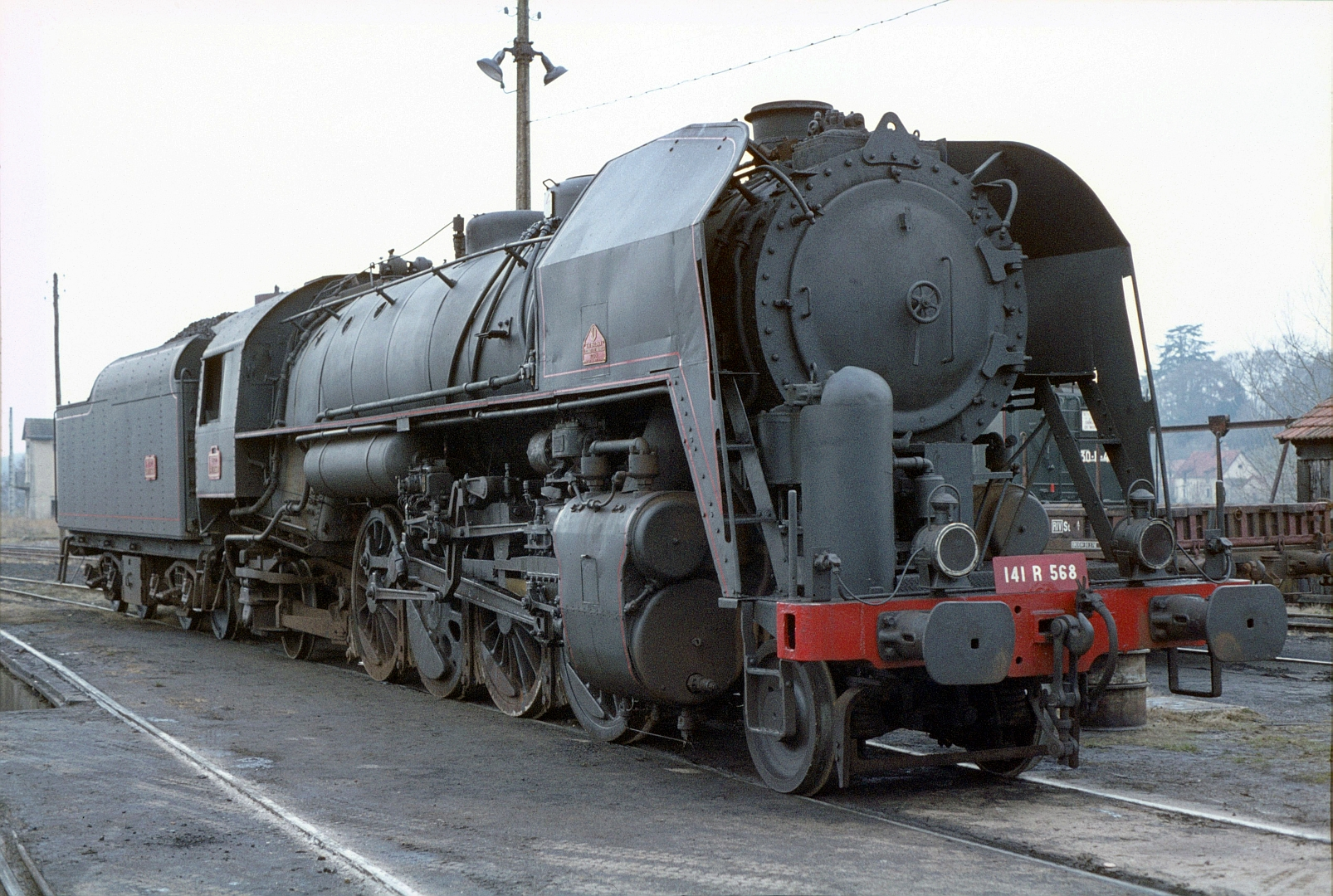
The 141.R.568 (Gray, 27 November 1981).

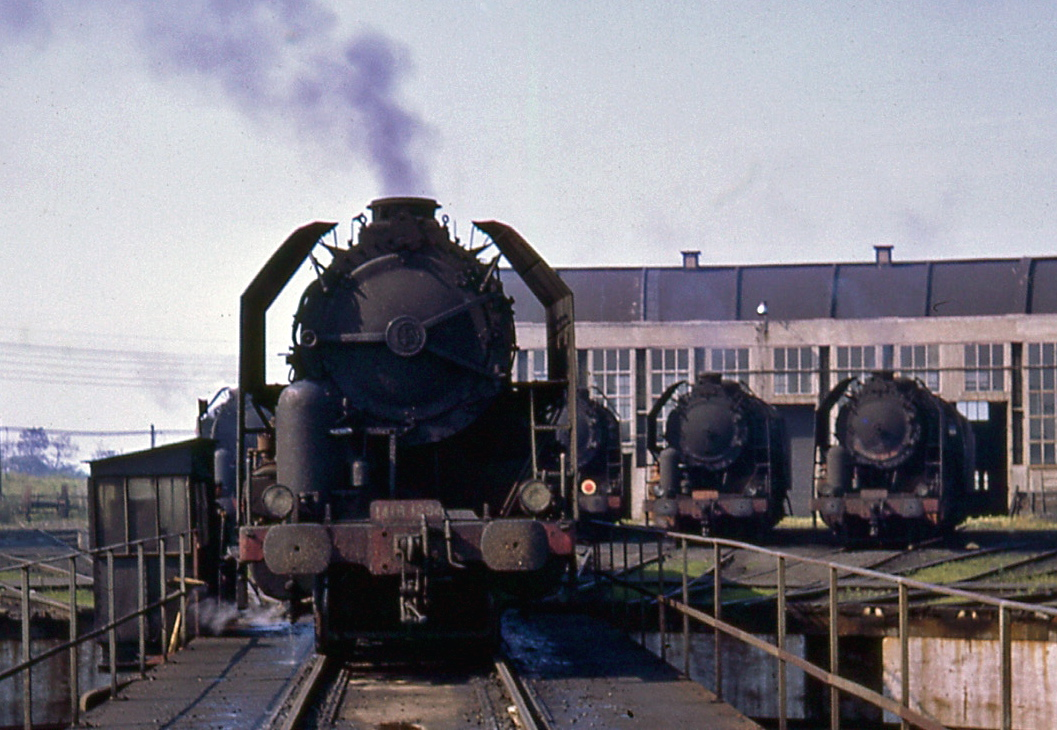
141.R.1294 at Calais shed, September 1968.

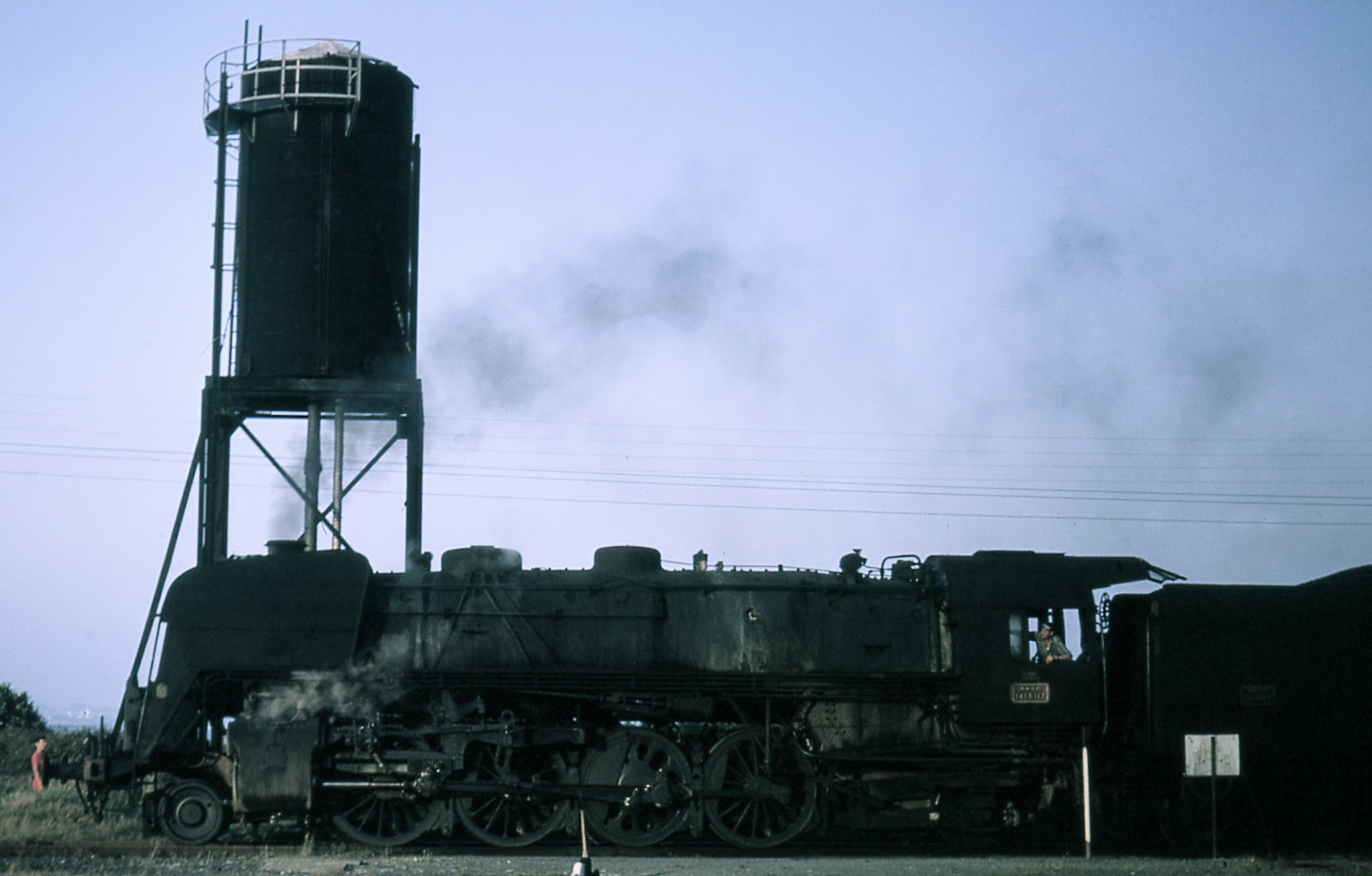
141.R.117 at Le Croisic after hauling a local from Nantes, August 1969.

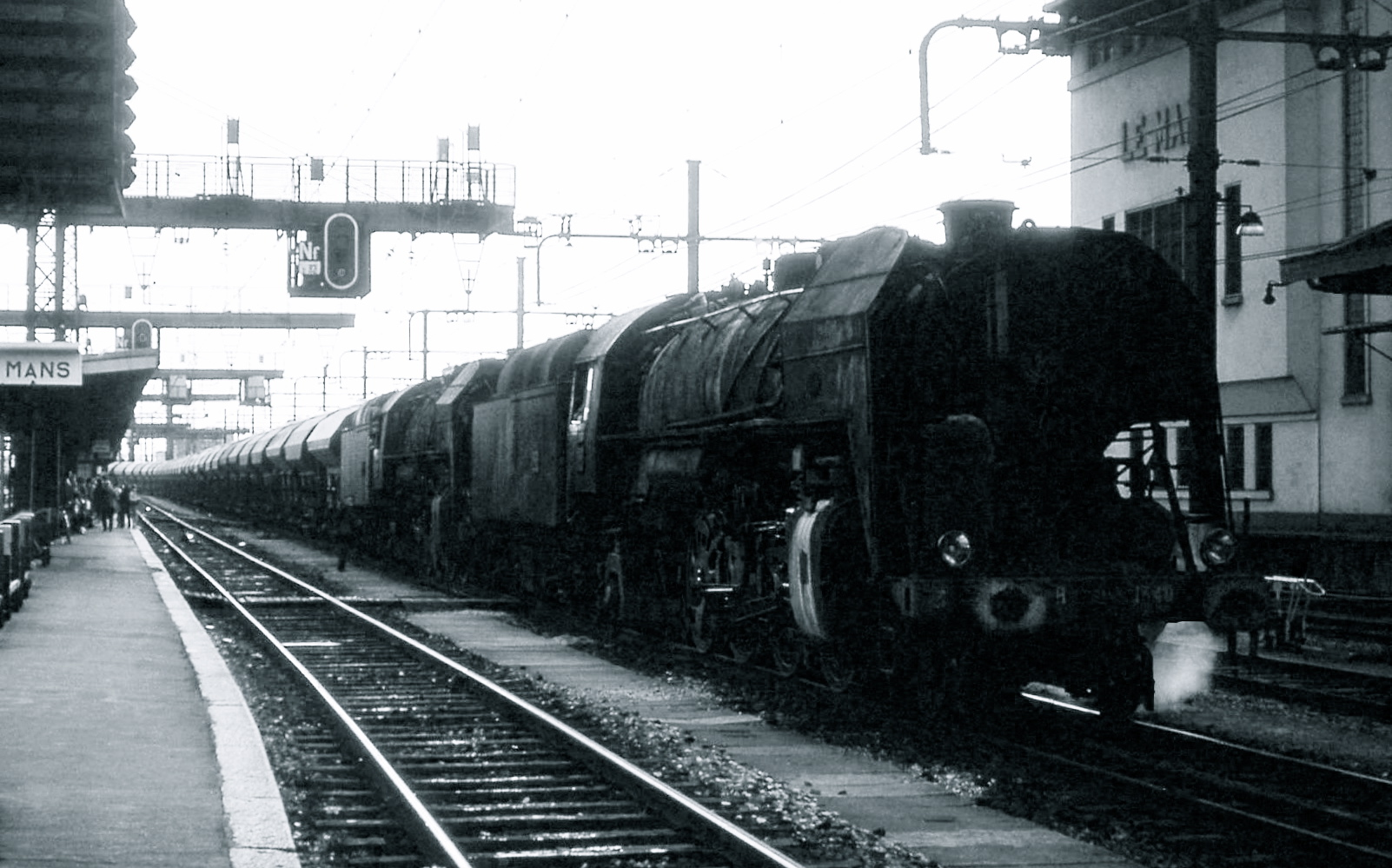
Eastbound freight at Le Mans, August 1969.

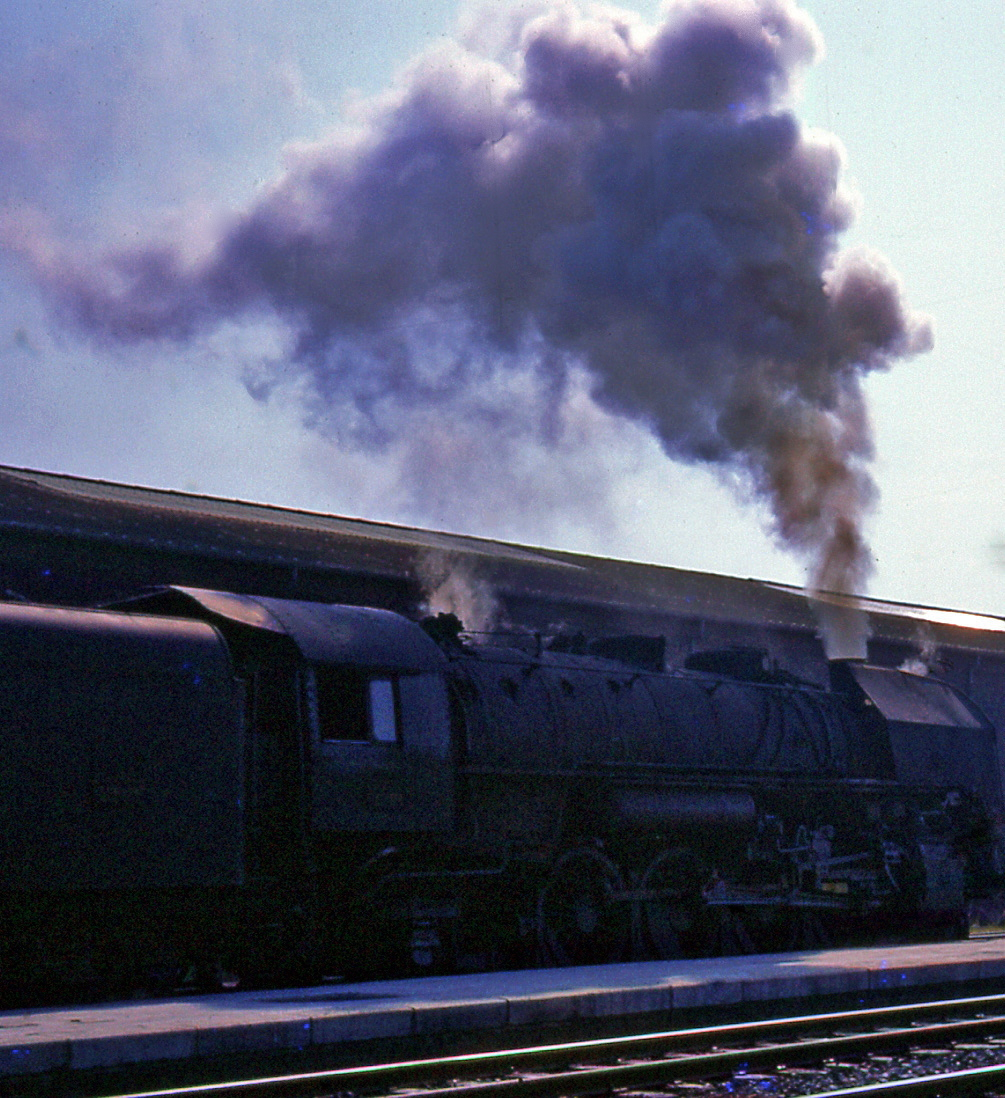
141.R runs light through Calais Ville, February 1969.

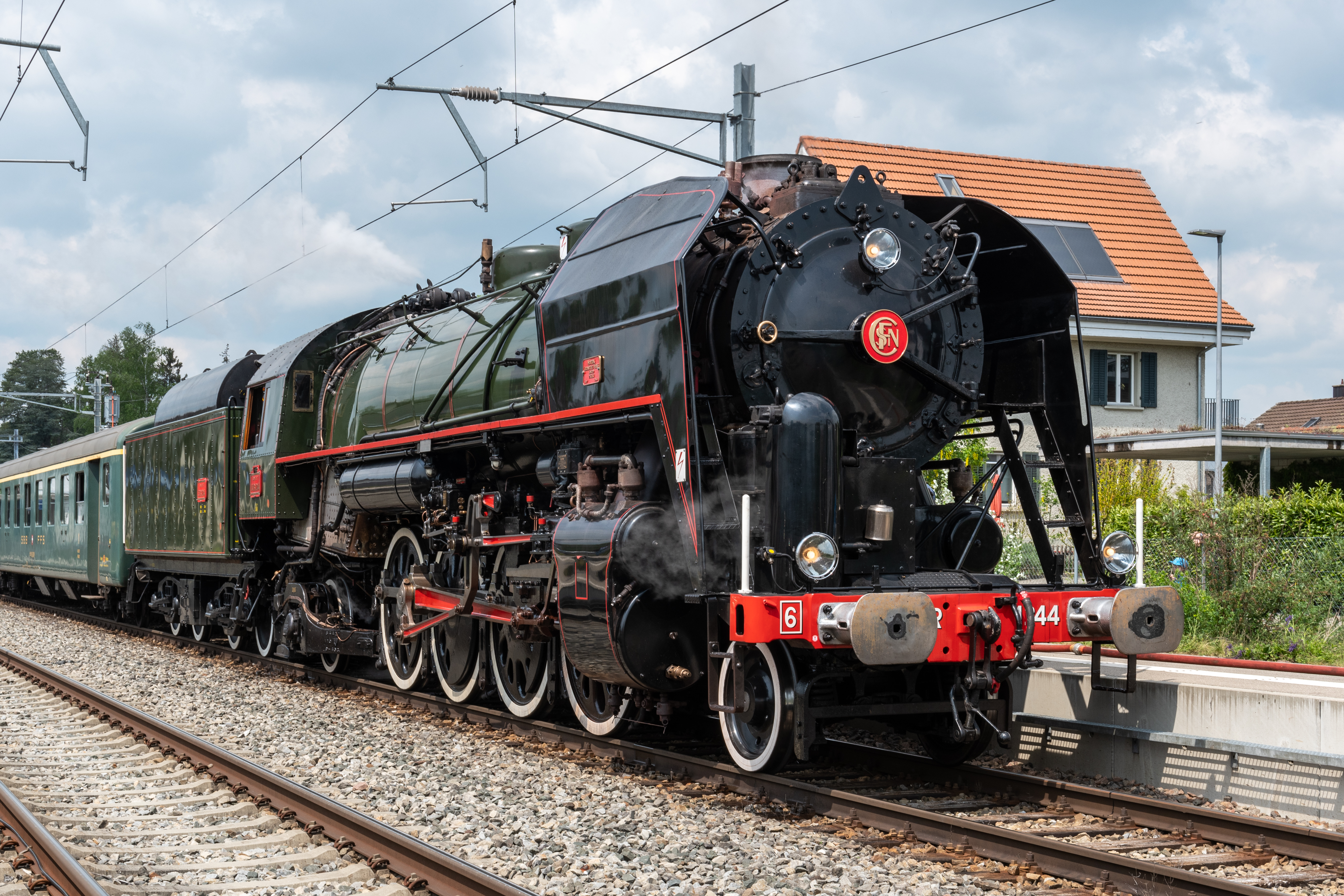
SNCF 141.R.1244 Mikado at Bad Zurzach station (Canton Aargau, Switzerland) during a round trip around the Lägern as part of the Zurzibiet-Küssaberg cross-border cultural night.

== See also ==
- List of SNCF classes
