= 141 R 1199 =

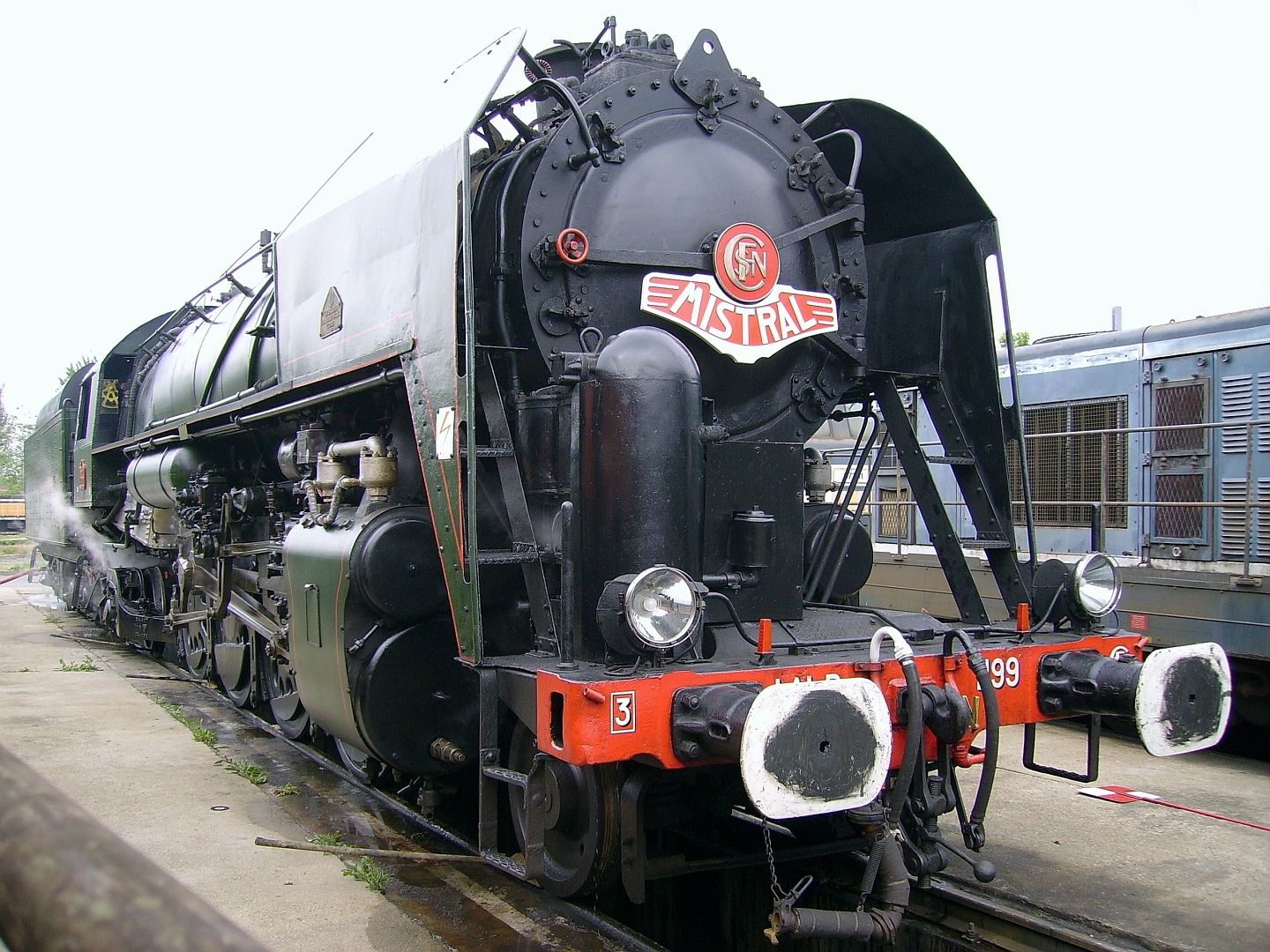
- 141 R 1199 seen at Villeneuve-St-Georges in 2007
Type and origin
- Power type: Steam
- Builder: Baldwin Locomotive Works
- Serial number: 73 048
Specifications
- Configuration
  - Whyte: 2-8-2
- Gauge: Standard gauge
- Length: 24.13 m (79 ft 2 in)
- Tender weight: 75 t (74 long tons; 83 short tons)
- Total weight: 191 t (188 long tons; 211 short tons)
- Water cap.: 30 m^{3} (6,600 imp gal; 7,900 US gal)
- Tender cap.: 13.5 m^{3} (480 ft^{3})
- Valve gear: Walschaerts valve gear
Performance figures
- Maximum speed: 100 km/h (62 mph)
- Power output: 2,150 kW (2,880 hp) at 80 km/h (50 mph)
Career
- Nicknames: R 1199, the R
- Locale: Le Mans
- First run: July 17, 1947
- Last run: August 25, 1971
- Current owner: SNCF

141 R 1199 is a preserved French steam locomotive of the SNCF Class 141Rs. The locomotive is classified as a Monument historique since 1984.

== History ==
Locomotive 1199 was built at the Baldwin Locomotive Works factory in Philadelphia, Pennsylvania as part of the rebuilding of the French rail network due to damage caused during the Second World War. Arriving in France (via the Port of Cherbourg), the unit was assigned to the depot at Le Mans. It worked out of Le Mans from July 17, 1947 until August 25, 1971, when it was retired after having travelled 1,627,474 km (1,011,265 mi). It was one of the few locomotives of the 141R type that worked out of the same depot over its service life.

In 1975, the locomotive was chosen to be donated to the San Diego Railroad Museum. The donation did not proceed and the unit was stored at Vitré station, under the supervision of the Association Rail 35. 1199 was then classified as a Monument historique on December 6, 1984. 1199 was moved in 1994 to Nantes-Blottereau station for restoration work by the Association Loco Vapeur 1199 (Steam Locomotive 1199 Association) (created in 1993) with work starting under an agreement signed that same year. Restoration lasted twelve years. 141 R 1199 was returned to the rails in 2004, making trips to the western part of the country. 1199 was pulled from service in 2011 for a boiler overhaul at a cost of 191 000 Euros with support of the Fondation du patrimoine.

The locomotive is well-known in France and has been visited by thousands during heritage events in the country.
