= Esther Edler =

Norwegian actress (1884–1908)

- Born: Esther Tomine Edler; 18 October 1884; Glemmen, Fredrikstad, Norway
- Died: 22 October 1908 (aged 24); Christiania, Norway
- Other names: Ester Sigurdt Abrahamsen
- Occupation: Actress
- Years active: 1905–1908
- Spouse: Peter Sigurth

Esther Tomine Edler (18 October 1884 – 22 October 1908) was a Norwegian actress.

== Early and personal life ==
Esther Edler was born on 18 October 1884 in Glemmen to ship owner and captain Jacob Edler Sørensen and Gerhardine Teresie Terjesen. She was married to actor Peter Sigurth (1881–1949) and was also known as Ester Sigurdt Abrahamsen.

== Career ==
Edler joined the Centralteatret in Christiania for the 1905–1906 season, where she made her debut as Suzanne in Thérèse Raquin by Émile Zola on 17 April 1905. The production was criticised however Edler's performance was praised. A month later, she played a firm but nosy maid in Bissons & Mars' farce Skilsmissens overraskelser on 27 May 1905. Edler also played Lully in Fjeldeventyret at the theatre.

The following season, Edler went on tour with Dore Lavik, where she played Gerd in Henrik Ibsen's Brand. She also appeared in a leading role in Jomfru Trofast by Vilhelm Krag in September 1906 and the play Lynggaard & Co. by Hjalmar Bergstrøm during the tour. In November 1907, she played Ms. Lohse in Klokkerne. On 24 January 1908, she played Mrs Wolf in Amalie Skram's Agnete. A month later, Edler again had a role in Brand but this time as Agnes, a role in which she was lauded, with one newspaper stating that her performance was the best in the production.

== Death ==
Edler died on 22 October 1908 in Christiania, at the age of 24.
