= Glemmen =

Parish and former municipality in Norway

Coordinates: 59°13′N 10°57′E

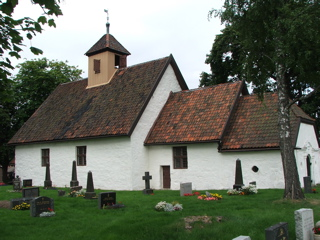
Glemmen Old church

Glemmen is a parish and former municipality with the city of Fredrikstad, Østfold county, Norway.

== History ==
The parish of Glemminge was established as a municipality 1 January 1838 (see formannskapsdistrikt). A part of Glemmen with 2,013 inhabitants was moved to Fredrikstad 1 January 1867. The island of Kråkerøy was separated from Glemmen to form a municipality of its own 1 January 1908. The split left Glemmen with 10,430 inhabitants. The rest of Glemmen was merged with the city of Fredrikstad January 1, 1964. Prior to the merger Glemmen had a population of 16,520.

The name Glemmen has given name to two churches. Glemmen Old Church (Gamle Glemmen Kirke) is a Romanesque church built of rubble in the 12th century and is probably the city's oldest building. The font, made of soapstone from Aremark, dates from about 1225. The altarpiece is from 1708 and the pulpit from 1731. Glemmen New Church (Glemmen nye kirke). The church was built of brick and dates from 1853. In 1888, it was extended and made into a cruciform church.

Glemmen is also the site of Glemmen senior high school (Glemmen Videregående Skole).

== Notable residents ==
- Esther Edler (1884–1908), actress
- Henry Gundersen (1920–1945), Norwegian resistance member who was executed during the occupation of Norway by Nazi Germany
- Sverre Walter Rostoft (1912–2001), politician for the Norwegian Conservative Party
- Erik Skogstrøm (1926–2014), journalist and newspaper editor who chaired the regional Norwegian Union of Journalists
- Tom Thoresen (born 1947), politician for the Norwegian Labour Party

== The name ==
Until 1918 the name was written Glemminge. The municipality (originally the parish) was named after the old farm Glemmen (Norse Glymheimar), since the first church was built on its ground. The first element is probably the old name of a brook, the last element is the plural form of heimr 'home, homestead, farm'. The name of the (supposed) brook is derived from the verb glymja 'rumble, make noise'.

== Other sources ==
- Dag Juvkam / Statistics Norway (1999). "Historisk oversikt over endringer i kommune- og fylkesinndelingen" (PDF).
