= Odd Isøy =

Norwegian resistance member

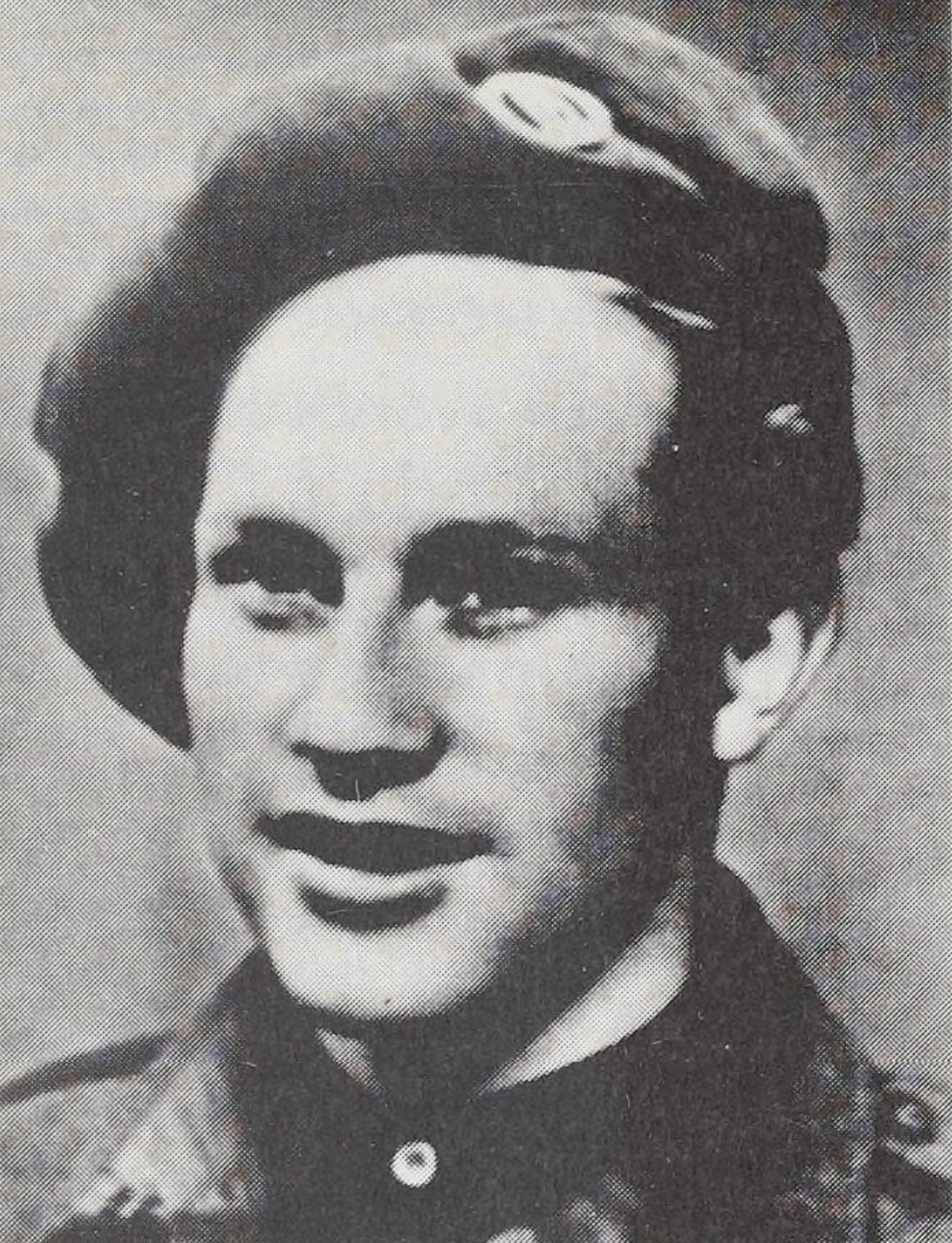

Odd E. Isøy (1923/1924 – 1983) was a Norwegian resistance member. Among others, he single-handedly placed explosives on the crane of the 3,215-ton Norwegian cargo ship MS Belpamela.

== World War II ==
During the occupation of Norway by Nazi Germany Isøy was a member of Milorg and their group for sabotage missions, Aks 13000. Of the 102 sabotage missions performed by Aks 13000, Isøy participated in 15, the highest number for a single person according to Per Røed. Per Røed himself is an exception here.

One of the notable missions in which Isøy participated was the sabotage against the garage belonging to the company Freia. The goal was to blow up the workshop for repairing aircraft parts with 40 kilograms (88 lb) of dynamite and some plastic explosives. The dynamite was split in two packs, and Odd Isøy brought one pack to Freia via bicycle. The team—Kjell Bull-Hansen, Odd Isøy, Arnold Guttormsen, Per Nitteberg, Bjørn Pedersen and Tor Pedersen—then gathered at Isøy's family's home, not far from Freia, in the evening. Bull-Hansen and Isøy was to enter the garage with a ladder and through the roof. The other team members were guarding the perimeter. After the fuse had been lit, four guards from the Luftwaffe showed up, one of whom was shot to death by Guttormsen or Nitteberg. When retreating, Isøy managed to stop a tram which was heading towards the soon-to-explode garage. Although the saboteurs did not have time to perform a broader evacuation of civil inhabitants in the area, there was no collateral human damage. The garage was utterly destroyed.

On 10 December 1944, Isøy participated in a sabotage mission near Oslo Vestbanestasjon. Isøy, Røed and Joar Olsen was to blow up fifteen railroad tank cars at Filipstad; two other persons were to be used as guards. However, the two guards became busy when a handful of railway workers were discovered on the location. After placing the explosives, Røed was intercepted as he almost stumbled upon a German guard. Because of this, the sabotage team retreated in silence, and not long after German specialists arrived and removed the explosives. Intelligence later showed that next to the fifteen tanks was a train filled with ammunition, possibly even V-2 parts. Had all of this exploded, it would be disastrous.

In late 1944 he participated in the sabotage against the civil vigilance office in Møllergata 16. This was especially dangerous, since it neighbored Møllergata 19. Bull-Hansen and Isøy performed the sabotage while Per Røed coordinated. By foot Isøy carried 10 kilograms (22 lb) of dynamite, and Bull Hansen 15 kilograms (33 lb); in addition both carried 20 litres of gasoline each. They did not meet opposition when placing the explosives, but when calling the police a few minutes before the explosion to ensure the clearing of the streets and vicinity, Per Røed had to use a telephone in a cover-up apartment, compromising their hideout. However, they managed to escape before forces arrived, and besides there were no deaths. After this, Bull-Hansen and Isøy attended a training camp in Sweden between 29 January and 23 March 1945. They went by boat from Strömstad to Tønsberg and by train from Tønsberg to Oslo, but Nazi patrollers discovered an error in Isøy's travel document, which was really entirely forged. The two were thrown off the train at Drammen Station and placed in Statspolitiet custody. The two ran away from the police at Bragernes Torg, but a chase ensued where Bull-Hansen was shot to death by a Hirdman. Isøy replaced Bull-Hansen as team leader within Aks 13000.

The next significant mission came on 26 April 1945, when tips arrived that the 3,215 ton German-controlled Norwegian cargo ship MS Belpamela of Oslo had survived rocket attacks from 36 British and Norwegian de Havilland Mosquitos from 143, 235, 248 and 333 squadrons’ at Framnæs Mekaniske Værksted on 2 April and been towed from Sandefjord to the Port of Oslo to undergo repair. While Per Røed, Svein Blindheim and other high-ranking Aks 13000 men discussed a sabotage, Isøy approached the tipper's home by himself. The tipper, who was captain of Belpamela, arranged the hiring of Isøy at the ship on the same day, under the codename Arvid Eriksen. After being shown his cabin, he left the shipyard and fetched 4.5 kilograms (9.9 lb) of plastic explosives in a cover-up apartment as well as other gear. About one and a half hour later he returned, prepared and placed the explosives, split into two parts, without significant trouble. Around 18:00 one part exploded; the other part was then discovered in haste and thrown off the ship. Belpamela did not return to service for the rest of the war. She shipwrecked off Newfoundland on 11 April 1947, while carrying a cargo of locomotives.

== Post-war life ==
Isøy died in 1983, having battled with health problems, possibly sustained during the war.
