= MS Belpamela =

Norwegian heavy-lift ship

SS Belpamela
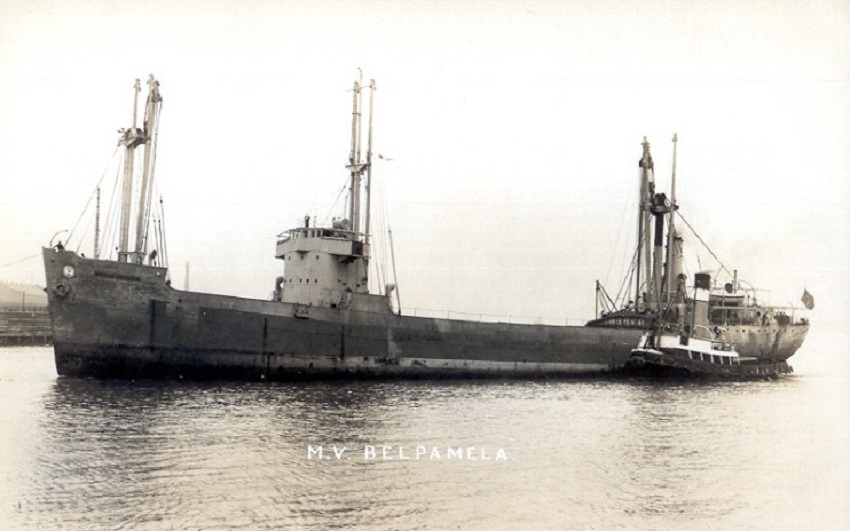

History
- Name: Belpamela
- Owner: Rederiet Belmoira A/S (to 1935); Skips A/S Belships Company Limited (from 1935)
- Operator: Christen Smith, Oslo
- Builder: Armstrong Whitworth, High Walker
- Yard number: 1028
- Identification: Call sign LGMK
- Fate: Sank in storm, 13 April 1947

General characteristics
- Type: Heavy lift ship
- Tonnage: 3,215 GT
- Length: 329 ft 6 in (100.43 m)
- Beam: 49 ft 2 in (14.99 m)
- Depth: 21 ft 2 in (6.45 m)
- Installed power: 1 Sulzer 4C60 diesel engine (four cylinder single acting diesel, 23 5/8 by 41 3/4 inches (600 mm × 1,060 mm), 1,350 hp (1,010 kW) at 110 rpm)
- Propulsion: One screw propeller
- Speed: 11 knots (20 km/h; 13 mph)

MS Belpamela was a heavy-lift ship of the Norwegian shipping company Belships. The ship sank on 11 April 1947 off Newfoundland while on passage from New York to Cherbourg, after the cargo of 17 locomotives shifted during a storm.

== Description ==
Belpamela was a heavy lift motor cargo ship with two thirds of the superstructure in the front and an engine located aft. She had two large holds with particularly large hatches. The ship, with a load capacity of around 4,500 tons, was prepared for the transport of extremely heavy or particularly bulky loads on deck. The loading gear accordingly consisted of six 5-tonne loading beams, one 30-tonne heavy-lift loading boom and one 100-tonne heavy-lift boom. For moving and stowing the bulky, heavy cargo, Belpamela was also equipped with rails in the hatches and several steam and electric winches on deck. The cargo holds were separated by a removable bulkhead so that long units could be stowed in the space.

== History ==
=== Pre-war ===
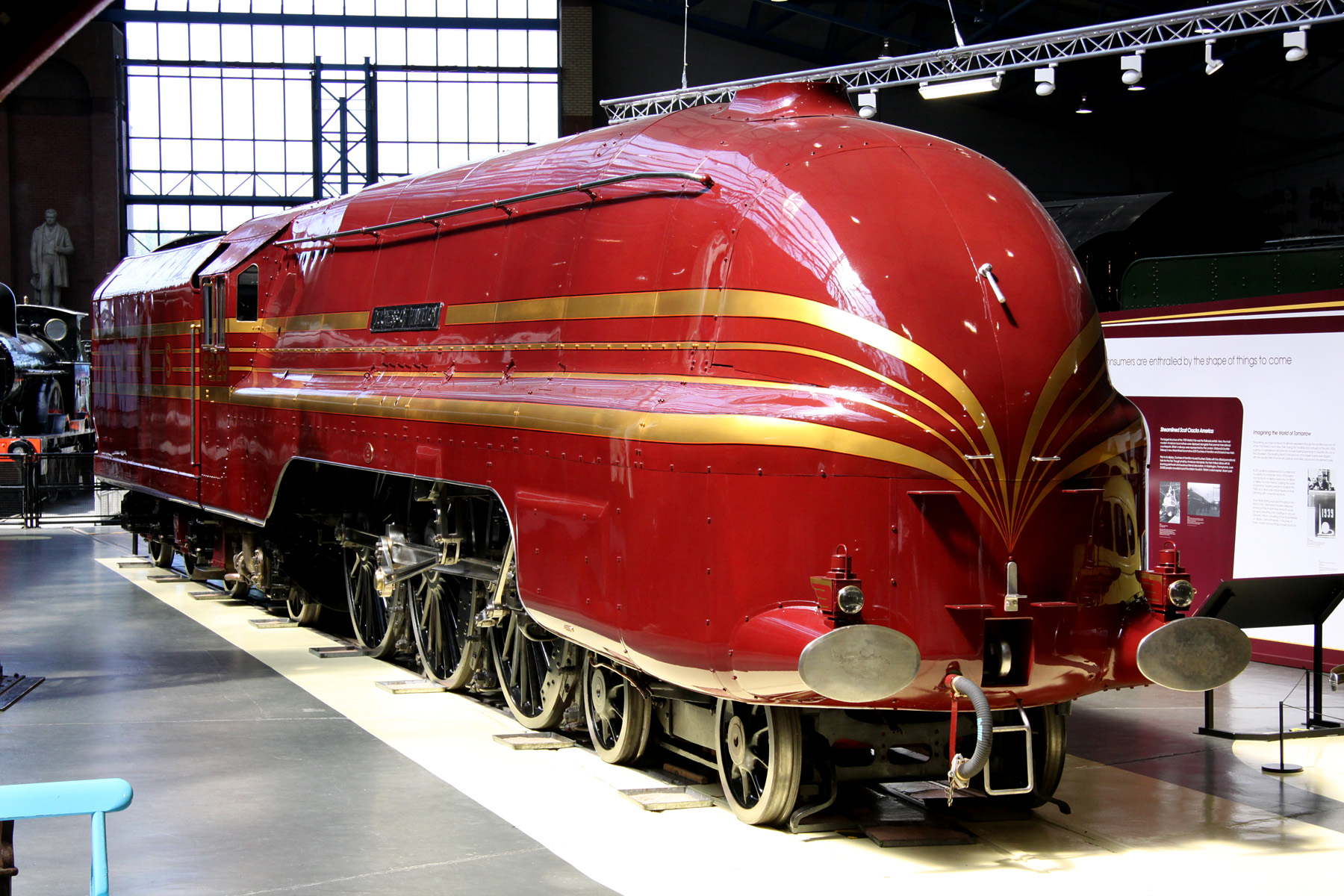
Streamlined Coronation Class locomotive

Belpamela was built by Armstrong Whitworth in February 1928 at its High Walker shipyard as yard number 1028. She was the lead ship of an order for two identical ships (the other was MS Belmoira). The ship was owned by Rederiet Belmoira A/S of Oslo, while it was managed by Christen Smith of Oslo. The ship was employed in the worldwide heavy lift transport. Typical cargoes consisted of locomotives and railway vehicles, but lightships, lighters and other smaller watercraft, aircraft or industrial plants of all kinds, such as oil rigs, etc. were also transported. Due to the unusual loads, newspapers, magazines and occasionally newsreels reported about the ship's operations. In October 1935 the ship was transferred to Skips A/S Belships Company Limited in Oslo, nothing changed in the management of Christen Smith. Notable cargoes include a batch of Vulcan Foundry-built China Railways KF series locomotives (including the preserved KF7) from Birkenhead to Shanghai, as well as a streamlined Coronation Scot train that Belpamela transported from Southampton, England to Baltimore, United States, in January and February 1939 for exhibition at the 1939 New York World's Fair.

=== World War II ===
In early March 1940, Belpamela was ordered together with the Swedish steamer SS Lagaholm from Baltimore to Malmö by the Royal Navy trawlers HMT Northern Sky and HMT Northern Princess to Kirkwall to search for contraband. In the early morning of 2 March, Belpamela was fired at upon by the German submarine U-32 with three torpedoes, all of which detonated prematurely. In a second attack at 7.15 a.m., U-32 stopped Lagaholm and sank it with gunfire after its crew had abandoned ship and were sitting in the lifeboats. They were picked up by Belpamela and taken to Kirkwall and North Ronaldsay. On 12 July 1940, Belpamela came under German control.

On 2 April 1945, Scottish-based de Havilland Mosquito fighter-bomber aircraft attacked ships awaiting repairs at the Framnæs Mekaniske Værksted shipyard in Sandefjord. MV Concordia and SS William Blumer were sunk, while Belpamela, Hektor, Shios Espana and Kattegat were damaged. Belpamela was towed to Oslo for repairs, where its completion was delayed until the end of the war due to sabotage by Odd Isøy, a member of the Norwegian resistance.

=== Post-war ===
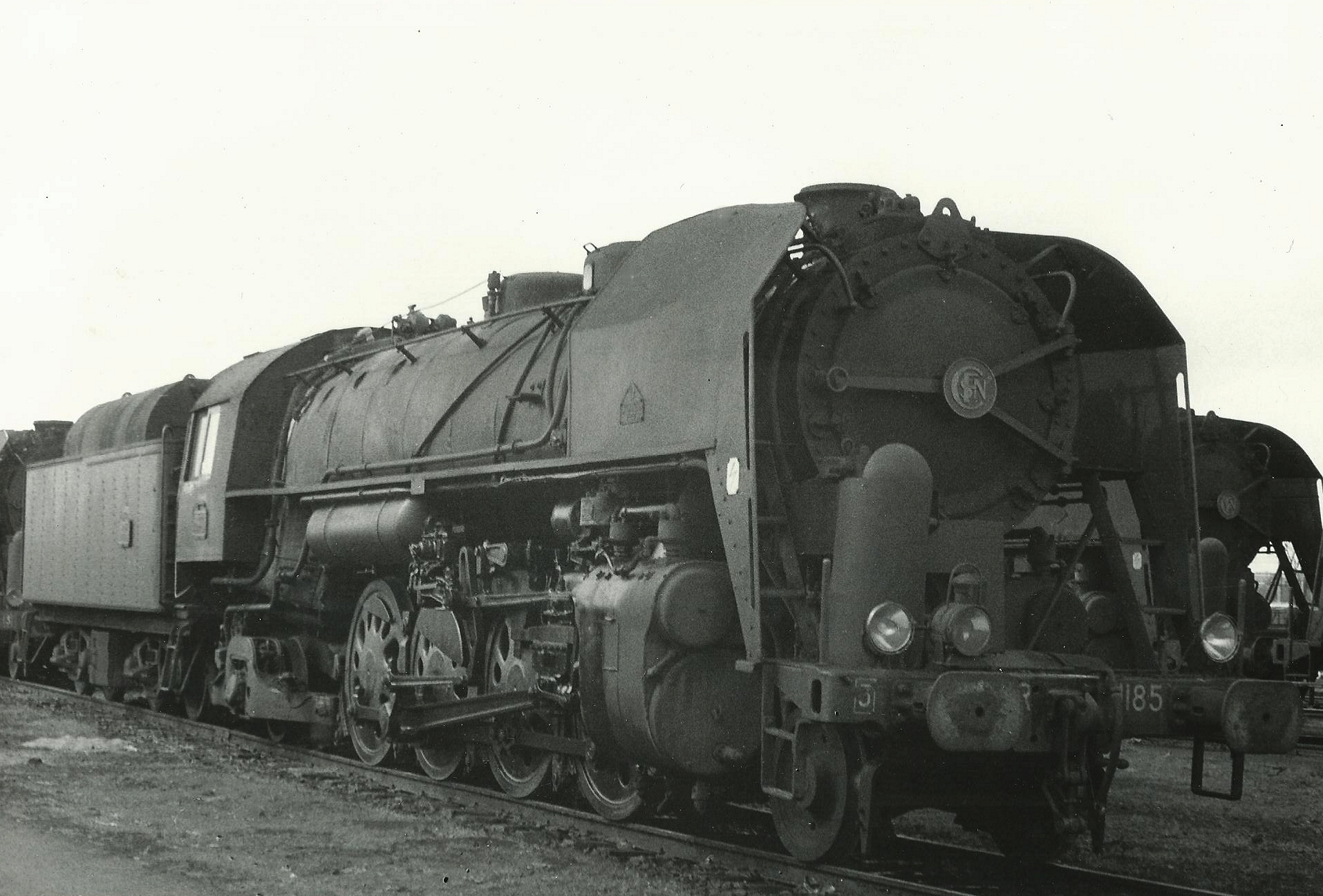
An SNCF 141 R in Rennes (1969)

After the end of the war, the ship was repaired and continued its worldwide heavy lift journey. A large order from SNCF, which had ordered a total of 1,340 Mikado-type 141 R locomotives from the United States and Canadian locomotive manufacturers to make up for war losses, took up particularly large space. In April 1947, Belpamela was on a trip from New York to Cherbourg with 17 of these locomotives, numbers 141.R.1220 to 141.R.1235 and 141.R.1241 from the manufacturer Montreal Locomotive Works . In the Atlantic, off the coast of Newfoundland, the ship got into severe bad weather, in which the locomotives shifted. and the ship sank at 37°44′N 53°3′W, with the loss of the lives of nine crew members.
