= Kåre Olafsen =

Norwegian resistance member (1920–1945)

Kåre Adolf Olafsen (19 January 1920 – 17 March 1945) was a Norwegian resistance member who was executed during the occupation of Norway by Nazi Germany.

He was born in Sørum, and lived in Østre Aker. He became involved in Milorg in 1941, during the occupation of Norway by Nazi Germany, and was responsible for transport and provisioning in the district. His last mission was Aksjon smør, in which Milorg men stole foodstuffs from two warehouses, one in the street Tollbugata belonging to German forces, and one in the street Skippergata belonging to Arbeidstjenesten. The foodstuffs were distributed to Milorg men who hid in the forests surrounding Oslo.

He was arrested by the Nazi authorities on 13 February 1945, during a crackdown which began when two Gestapo officers intercepted a resistance meeting in Storm Weinholdt's home. Storm Weinholdt and Frank Olsen were arrested, and Adolf Bogstad was killed. Olafsen and several others were rounded up. He was sentenced to death on 15 March in an SS court-martial; prosecutor was Siegfried Fehmer. He was executed by gunshot at Hovedøya on 17 March, and his body was lowered in the Oslofjord. This was the second to last execution of Norwegians by Germans during the war; the last person was an SS-Jäger executed for desertion (Fahnenflucht) on 19 April.

Together with eight other resistance members—Adolf Bogstad, Erik Bruun, Henry Gundersen, Arvid Hansen, Ingolf Nordstrøm, Frank Olsen, Kjell Ramberg and Storm Weinholdt—he is commemorated with a memorial stone at Sarabråten in Østmarka.
