= Frank Olsen =

Norwegian resistance member (1922–1945)

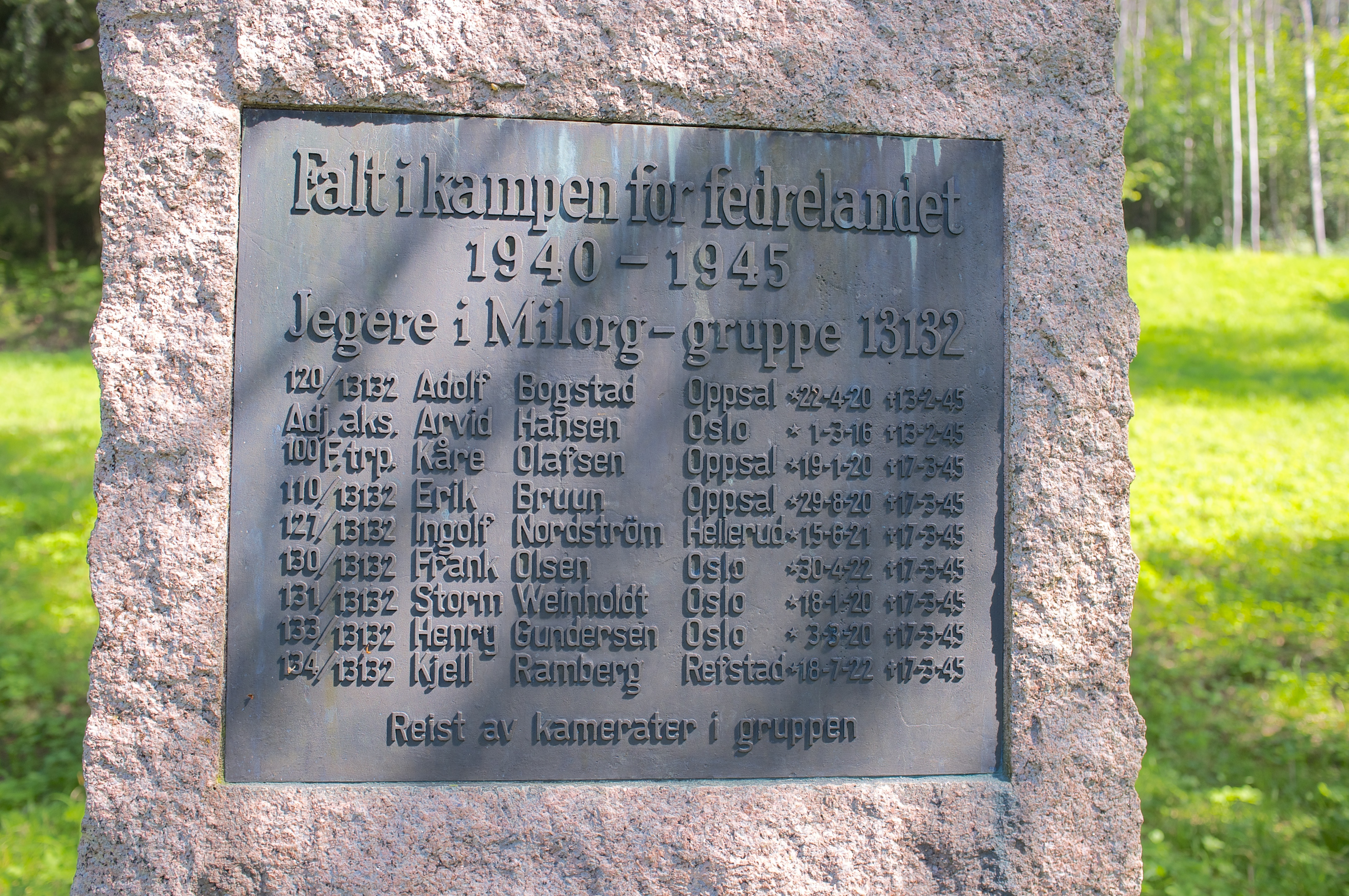
From the Memorial at Sarabråten in Østmarka. The text reads: Fallen in the fight for the fatherland 1940 - 1945. Hunters in Milorg group 13132. Frank Olsen's name is listed.

Frank Olsen (30 April 1922 – 17 March 1945) was a Norwegian resistance member who was executed during the occupation of Norway by Nazi Germany.

He was born in Vestby, and lived in Oslo. During the occupation of Norway by Nazi Germany, he became involved in Milorg, and carried out a series of sabotage missions. On 13 February 1945, Olsen was going to plan a sabotage action to take place on the same evening, together with Adolf Bogstad and Storm Weinholdt, in the latter's home at Kampen. Before either of these arrived, two Gestapo officers, one German and one Norwegian, arrived in the Weinholdt family's home to check on Storm Weinholdt's brother Kjell. As Kjell was not home either, the Gestapo officers waited in the living room. Bogstad and Storm Weinholdt soon arrived, and while the Gestapo officers became suspicious of the rendez-vous, the men stated that they were planning an outdoors trip. They were searched, and knew that they had to leave before Frank Olsen showed up, as Olsen carried important documents which would compromise them. When Olsen did arrive, he was spotted by Storm Weinholdt's father through a window, but he was unable to contact Olsen. Olsen rang the doorbell, entered, and the Gestapo officers understood the situation. The three resistance members were held in the house for the time being, but after Adolf Bogstad tried to escape and was killed, Frank Olsen was arrested together with Storm Weinholdt, Weinholdt's father and his brother Kjell, who also had arrived. They were subject to torture at Møllergata 19. Frank Olsen was sentenced to death on 15 March in an SS court-martial; prosecutor was Siegfried Fehmer. He was executed by gunshot at Akershus Fortress on 17 March. His body was lowered in the Oslofjord. This was the second to last execution of Norwegians by Germans during the war; the last person was an SS-Jäger executed for desertion (Fahnenflucht) on 19 April.

Together with eight other resistance members—Adolf Bogstad, Erik Bruun, Henry Gundersen, Arvid Hansen, Ingolf Nordstrøm, Kåre Olafsen, Kjell Ramberg and Storm Weinholdt—he is commemorated with a memorial stone at Sarabråten in Østmarka.
