= Adolf Bogstad =

Norwegian resistance member (1920–1945)

Adolf Bogstad (22 April 1920 – 13 February 1945) was a Norwegian resistance member who was killed during the occupation of Norway by Nazi Germany.

He was born and lived in Østre Aker. During the occupation of Norway by Nazi Germany, he became involved in Hjemmefronten in 1940 and Milorg in 1941. He was involved in weapons transport and the illegal press, and became the leader of District 13. His last action was Aksjon smør, in which Milorg men stole foodstuffs from two warehouses, one in the street Tollbugata belonging to German forces, and one in the street Skippergata belonging to Arbeidstjenesten. The foodstuffs were distributed to Milorg men who hid in the forests surrounding Oslo.

On the next day, Bogstad was going to plan the next action, together with Frank Olsen and Storm Weinholdt, in the latter's home at Kampen. Before either of these arrived, two Gestapo officers, one German and one Norwegian, arrived in the Weinholdt family's home to check on Storm Weinholdt's brother Kjell. As Kjell was not home either, the Gestapo officers waited in the living room. Bogstad and Storm Weinholdt soon arrived, and while the Gestapo officers became suspicious of the rendez-vous, the men stated that they were planning an outdoors trip. They were searched, and knew that they had to leave before Frank Olsen showed up, as Olsen carried important documents which would compromise them. When Olsen did arrive, the Gestapo officers understood the situation, and held the three resistance members, guns pointed. Adolf Bogstad tried to escape through the front door, but were shot twice in the back; one shot from each of the officers. Since he did not die, he was shot twice in the back of the head by the German officer.

Together with eight other resistance members—Erik Bruun, Henry Gundersen, Arvid Hansen, Ingolf Nordstrøm, Kåre Olafsen, Frank Olsen, Kjell Ramberg and Storm Weinholdt—he is commemorated with a memorial stone at Sarabråten in Østmarka.
