= Kjell Bull-Hansen =

Norwegian resistance member

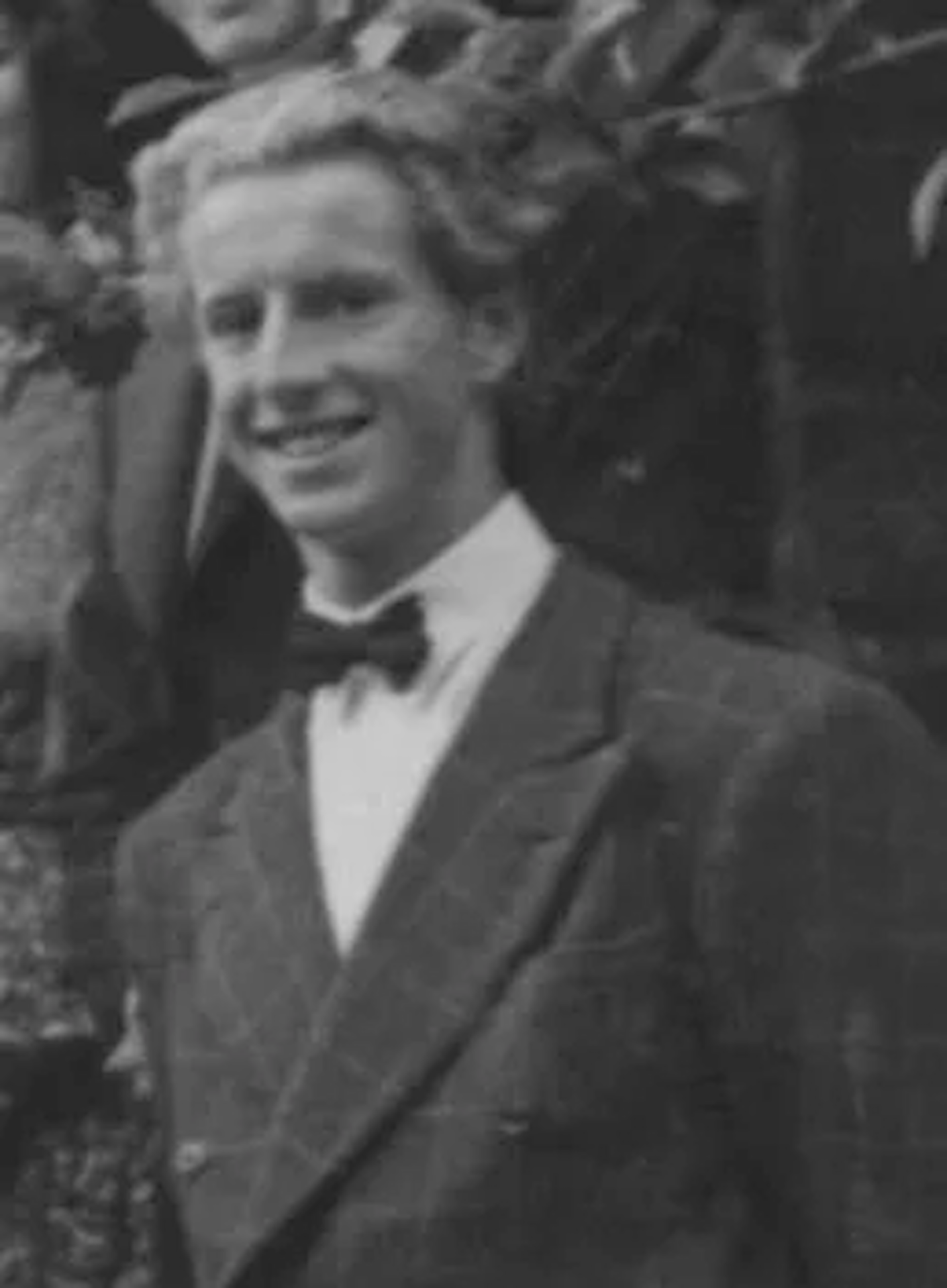
- Born: May 31, 1923; Oslo, Norway
- Died: March 24, 1945 (aged 21); Drammen, Norway

Kjell Bull-Hansen (31 May 1923 – 24 March 1945) was a Norwegian resistance member who was killed during the occupation of Norway by Nazi Germany.

== Pre-war life ==
He was born in Oslo and lived in Vestre Aker, at Tåsen. Before World War II he attended a technical evening school, and took classes in drawing, painting and mechanics.

== World War II ==
During the occupation of Norway by Nazi Germany, he became involved in Milorg. He joined District 13's sabotage squad Aks 13000, and served as one of several team leaders.

One of the notable missions led by Bull-Hansen was the sabotage against the garage belonging to the company Freia in November 1944. The goal was to blow up the workshop for repairing airplane parts with 40 kilograms (88 lb) of dynamite and some plastic explosives. The dynamite was split in two packs, and Bull-Hansen brought one pack to Freia via bicycle. He also supplied matchsticks. The team—Kjell Bull-Hansen, Odd Isøy, Arnold Guttormsen, Per Nitteberg, Bjørn Pedersen and Tor Pedersen—then gathered at Isøy's family's home, not far from Freia, in the evening. Bull-Hansen and Isøy were to enter the garage with a ladder and through the roof. The other team members were guarding the perimeter. After the fuse had been lit, four guards from the Luftwaffe showed up, one of whom was shot to death by Guttormsen or Nitteberg. Although the saboteurs did not have time to perform a broader evacuation of civil inhabitants in the area, there was no collateral human damage. The garage was utterly destroyed.

In late 1944 he participated in the sabotage against the civil vigilance office in Møllergata 16. This was especially dangerous, since it neighbored Møllergata 19. Bull-Hansen and Isøy performed the sabotage while vice leader of Aks 13000, Per Røed, coordinated. By foot Bull-Hansen carried 15 kilograms (33 lb) of dynamite, and Isøy 10 kilograms (22 lb); in addition each carried 20 litres of gasoline. They did not meet opposition when placing the explosives, but when calling the police a few minutes before the explosion to ensure the streets and vicinity had been cleared, Per Røed had to use a telephone in a cover-up apartment, compromising their hideout. However, they managed to escape before forces arrived, and besides there were no deaths. After this, Bull-Hansen and Isøy attended a training camp in Sweden between 29 January and 23 March 1945. They went by boat from Strömstad to Tønsberg and by train from Tønsberg to Oslo, but Nazi patrollers discovered an error in Isøy's travel document, which was actually a complete forgery. The two were thrown off the train at Drammen Station and placed in Statspolitiet custody. The two ran away from the police at Bragernes Torg, and since the guards stopped to draw their guns, the two got a 200-metre headstart. They ran down the road along the river Drammenselva. When they reached the road's end, they could have run back into the city but instead climbed a fence, entering the property of the well-known brewery Aass. Isøy passed the fence, careered past a warehouse and hid in the river. Bull-Hansen, however, slipped at the fence, ran into the city instead and tried to hide at the public baths (adjacent to Aass) but was discovered. He surrendered, but was shot in the right leg and left lung by a Hirdman. He was buried at Vår Frelsers gravlund.
