= Per Giertsen =

Norwegian physician (1906–1990)

Per Egeberg Giertsen (26 June 1906 – 1990) was a Norwegian physician, especially known for helping members of the Norwegian resistance movement during and after World War II.

== Pre-war career ==
He was born in Kristiania (Oslo), and graduated from the Royal Frederick University with the cand.med. degree in 1932. He worked as a municipal physician in Nedre Eiker from 1932 to 1934, and then moved back to Oslo where he had his own physician's office.

== World War II ==
During the occupation of Norway by Nazi Germany, he became involved in the Norwegian resistance movement. Starting on 14 September 1944 he was a contact of the sabotage squad Aks 13000. During a sabotage attack against gasoline tanks at Vestheim School, saboteur Reidar Smith was shot, but managed to crawl home to his aunt Frieda Smith, who contacted Giertsen. Giertsen went to Smith's home, then brought the injured saboteur to his own home the following morning, and kept him there for three weeks. This pattern, with Giertsen both making "field visits" as well as providing housing, continued. Giertsen helped with almost all in-battle injuries of Aks 13000. He also helped with injuries sustained elsewhere, such as Per Røed's arm injury caused by a horse bite.

== Post-war career ==
After the liberation of Norway in May 1945, when Aks 13000 became Sentralledelsens Aksjonskommando under the temporary Home Front rule, Giertsen continued to serve. Without payment he performed medical checks of all sabotage personnel in the district, at a hotel in Frogner together with Ole Øyseth. He later struggled to gain recognition and acknowledgement of certain saboteurs' injuries as war injuries eligible for welfare benefits. One particular case, in which a saboteur was ultimately granted veteran's welfare, lasted from 1950 to 1958. Giertsen also continued his physician career, and worked part-time in the companies Fred. Olsen & Co. from 1935 to 1947, Aftenposten from 1945 to 1973, Esso Norway from 1945 to 1955, Leif Höegh & Co from 1955 to 1975 as well as the Norwegian royal court administration from 1945 to 1984. He was also a physician at the 1952 Winter Olympics as well as Holmenkollen events.

He was decorated with the Defence Medal 1940 – 1945 and the Royal Norwegian Order of St. Olav. He also received an award plaque from the Association for the Promotion of Skiing. He died in September 1990.
