= Sarabråten =

Recreational area in Oslo, Norway

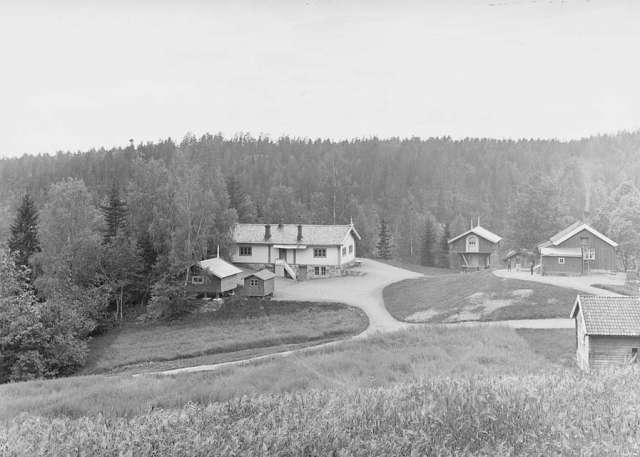
- Sarabråten in the 1880s. The building no longer exists
- Interactive map of Sarabråten
- Type: Recreational area
- Location: Østmarka
- Nearest city: Oslo
- Coordinates: 59.8918°N 10.8788°E
- Operator: Oslo municipality

Sarabråten is an area near the lake Nøklevann in Østmarka, Oslo, Norway.

Now a recreational area, it was owned by Thomas Johannessen Heftye and his descendants from 1856 to 1911, and after that by Oslo municipality. It was first recorded under the name Jørgensrud in 1578, when owned by the Diocese of Oslo. A ski jumping hill was located here earlier.

Sarabråten has a memorial of Christian Dons, founder of the Scout Movement in Norway, as well as a memorial raised in 1946 of nine WWII resistance members.
