= Immigration to Europe =

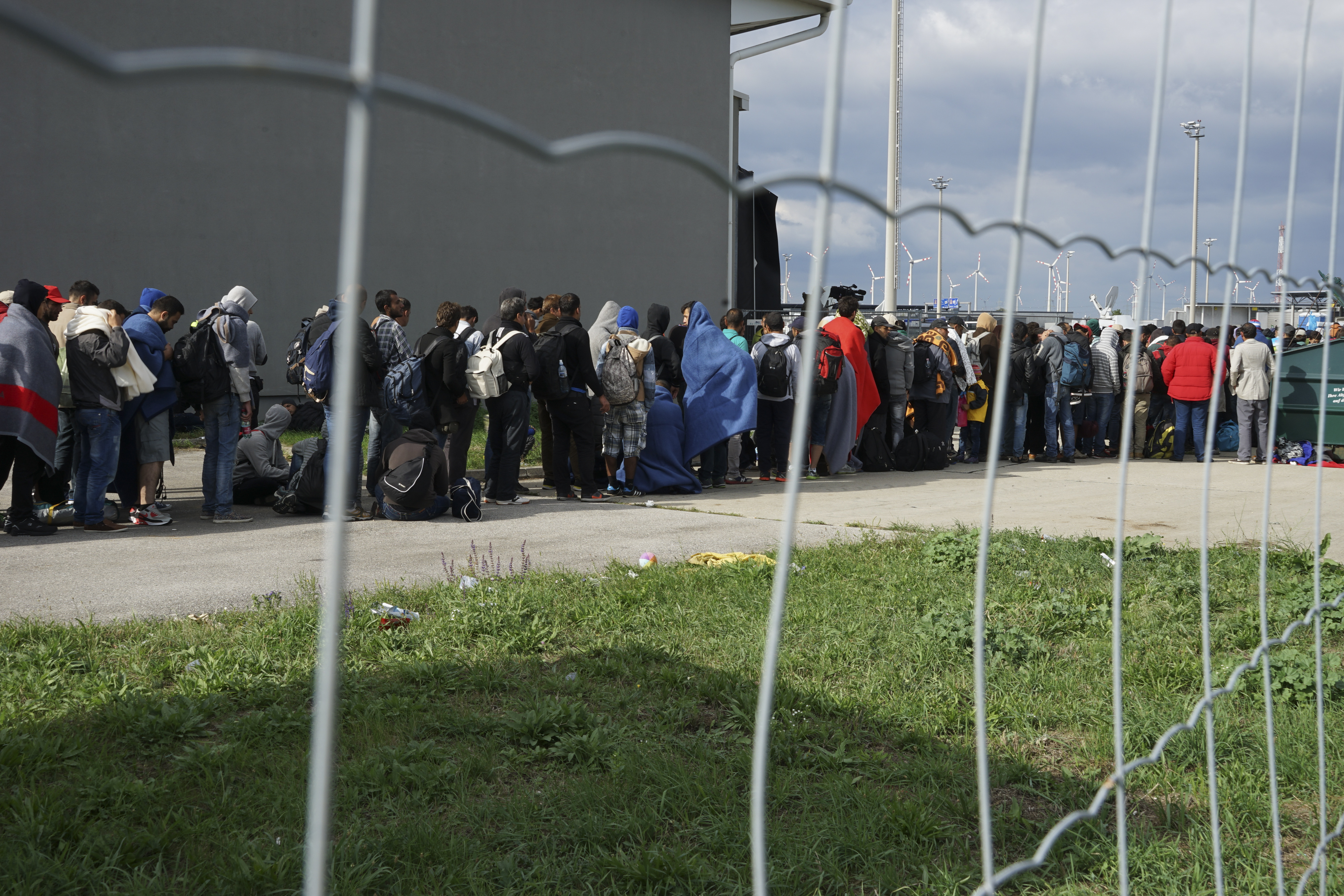
Line of Syrian and refugees between the border Hungary and Austria 2015.

Immigration to Europe has a long history, but increased substantially after World War II. Western European countries, especially, saw high growth in immigration post 1945, and many European nations today (particularly those of the EU-15) have sizeable immigrant populations, both of European and non-European origin. In contemporary globalization, migrations to Europe have accelerated in speed and scale. Over the last decades, there has been an increase in negative attitudes towards immigration, and many studies have emphasized marked differences in the strength of anti-immigrant attitudes among European countries.

Beginning in 2004, the European Union granted EU citizens freedom of movement and residence within the EU, and the term "immigrant" has since been used to refer to non-EU citizens, meaning that EU citizens are not to be defined as immigrants within EU territory. The European Commission defines "immigration" as the action by which a person from a non-EU country establishes their usual residence in the territory of an EU country for a period that is or is expected to be at least twelve months. Between 2010 and 2013, around 1.4 million non-EU nationals, excluding asylum seekers and refugees, immigrated into the EU each year using regular means, with a slight decrease since 2010.

== History ==
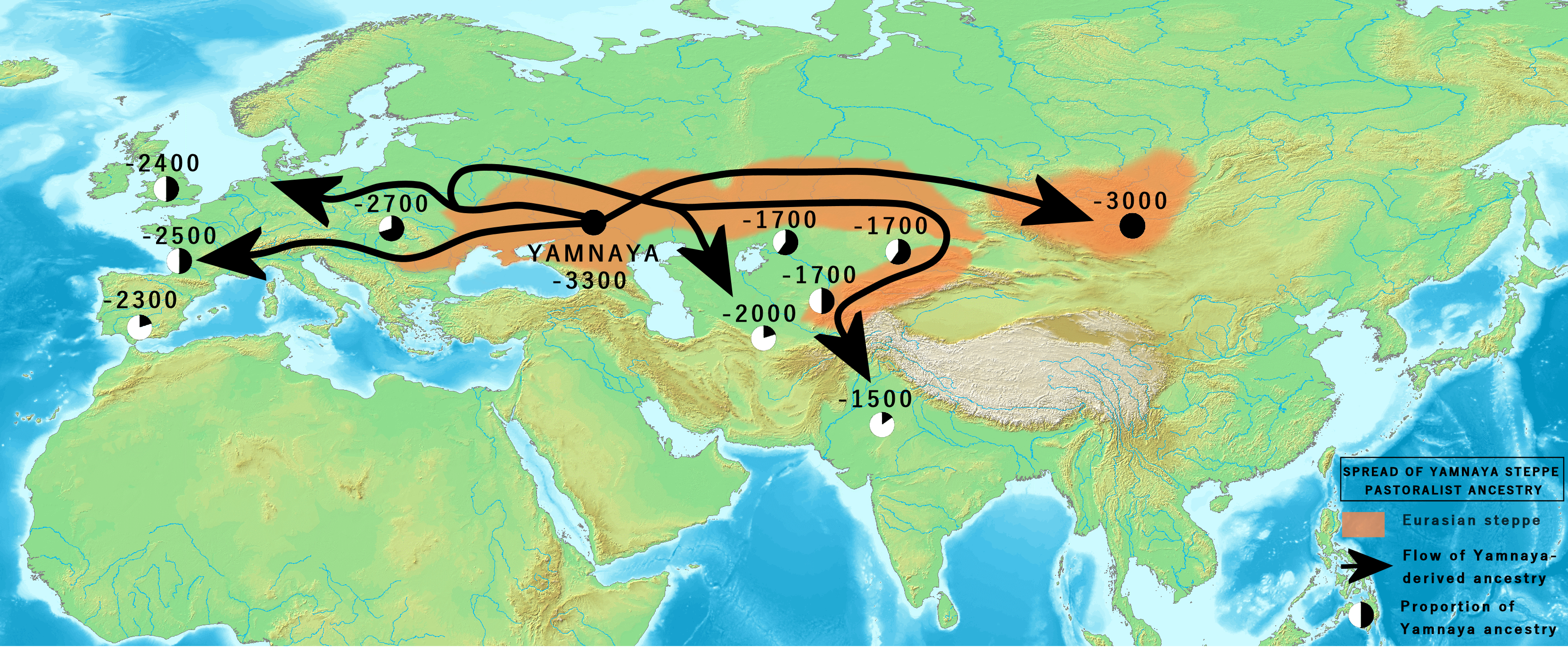
Bronze Age spread of Yamnaya Steppe pastoralist ancestry in 3000–1500 BC

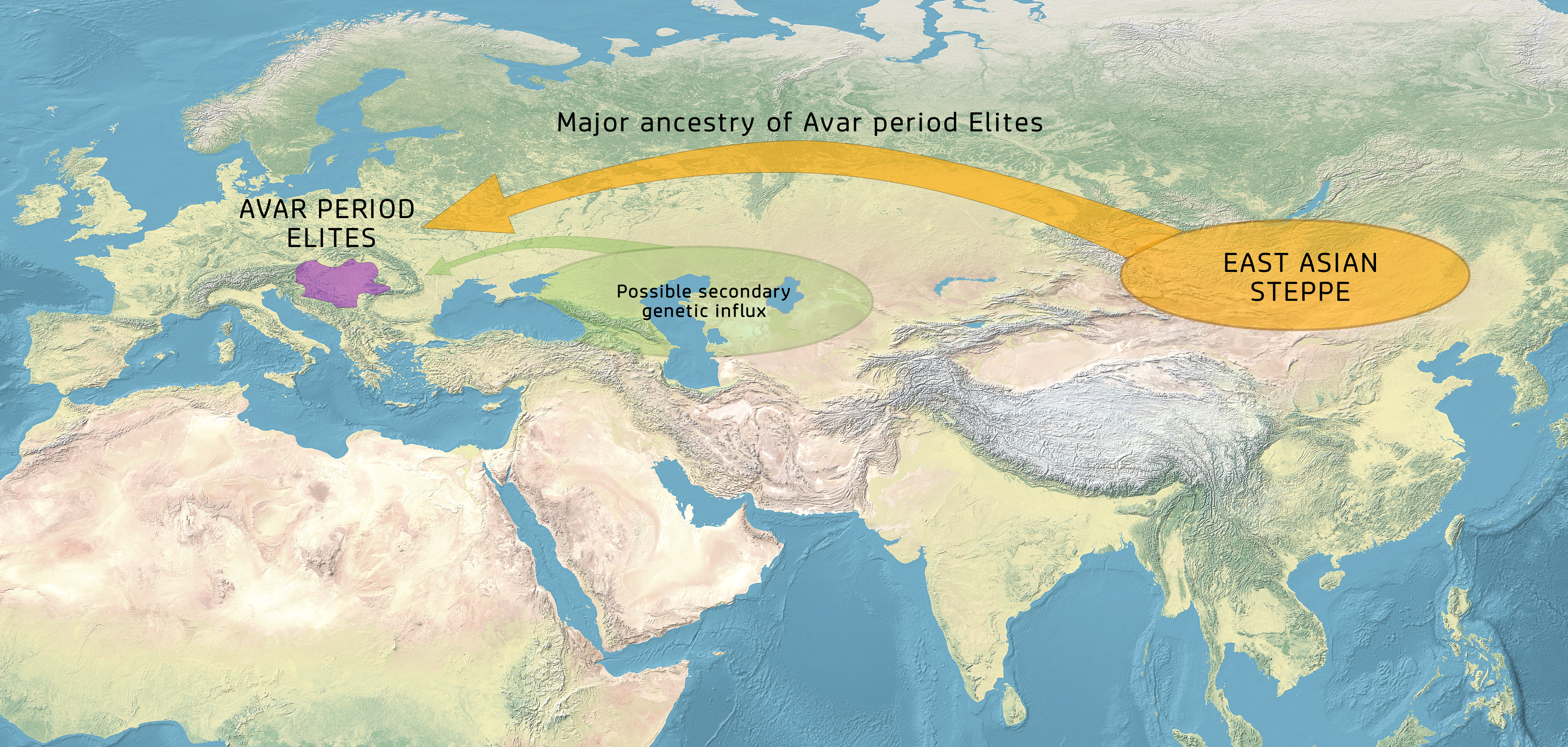
Genomic evidence from human remains shows that the Avars were essentially derived from Ancient Northeast Asians.

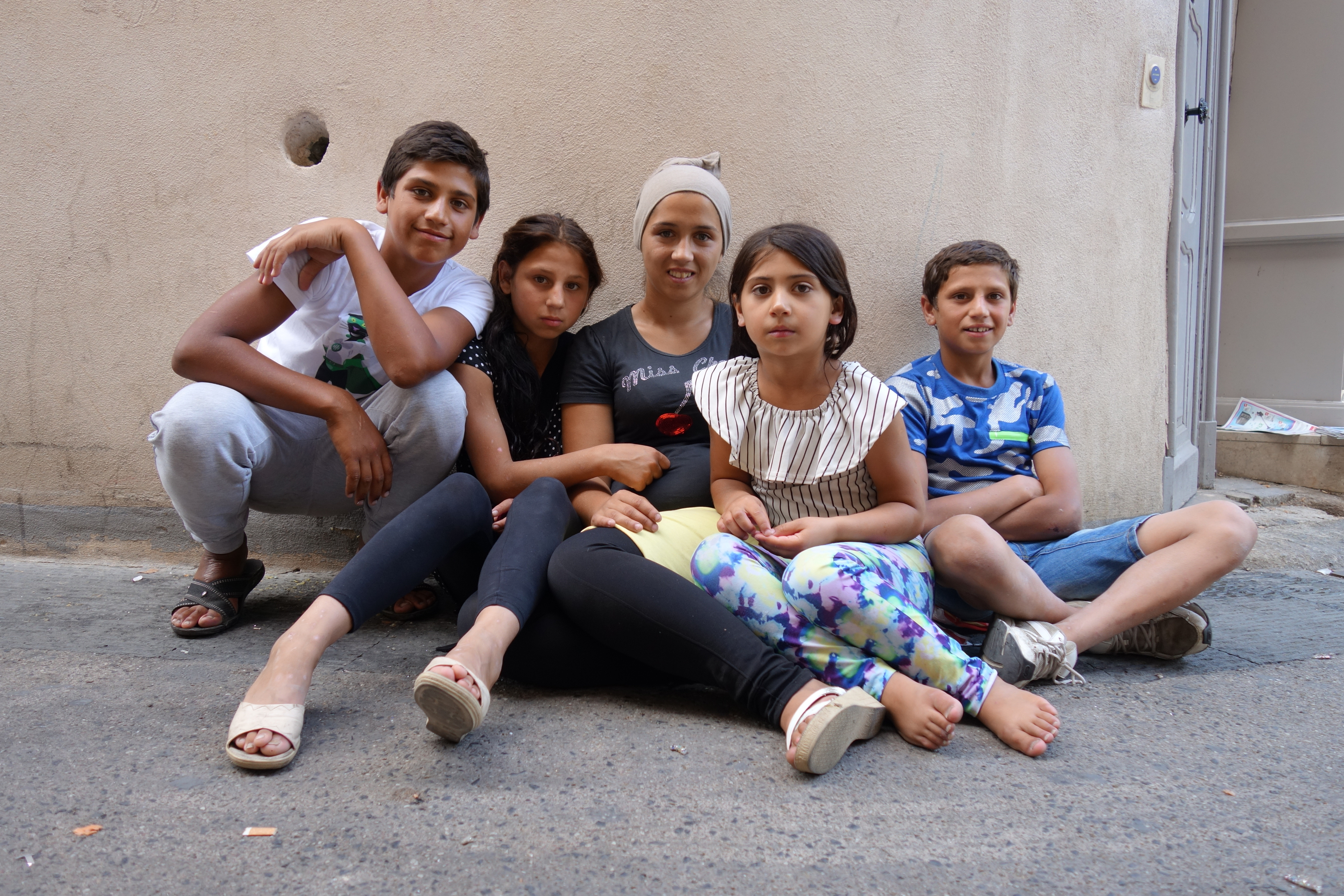
The Roma migrated into Europe from South Asia about 1,000 years ago

The Yamnaya, a Bronze Age pastoralist culture from the Pontic–Caspian steppe (modern Russia/Ukraine), migrated into Europe around 3000 BC, drastically transforming its genetic, linguistic, and cultural landscape. This migration is considered the third major prehistoric migration event in Europe, following the initial settlement by hunter-gatherers and the arrival of early farmers from Anatolia. The Yamnaya migration in particular showed a strong, sex-biased, male-driven replacement, with newcomers replacing local male lineages while marrying local women.

Historical migration into or within Europe has mostly taken the form of military invasion, but there have been exceptions; this concerns notably population movements within the Roman Empire under the Pax Romana; the Jewish diaspora in Europe was the result of the First Jewish–Roman War of AD 66–73.

With the collapse of the Roman Empire, migration was again mostly coupled with warlike invasion, not least during the so-called migration period (Germanic), the Slavic migrations, the Hungarian conquest of the Carpathian Basin, the Islamic conquests and the Turkic expansion into Eastern Europe (Kipchaks, Tatars, Cumans). The Ottomans once again established a multi-ethnic imperial structure across Western Asia and Southeastern Europe, but Turkification in Southeastern Europe was due more to cultural assimilation than to mass immigration. In the late medieval period, the Romani people moved into Europe both via Anatolia and the Maghreb.

There were substantial population movements within Europe throughout the Early Modern period, mostly in the context of the Reformation and the European wars of religion, and again as a result of World War II.

From the late 15th century until the late 1960s and early 1970s, Greece, Ireland, Italy, Germany, Norway, Sweden, Denmark, Belgium, Portugal, Spain and the United Kingdom were primarily sources of emigration, sending large numbers of emigrants to the Americas, Australia, Siberia and Southern Africa. A number also went to other European countries (notably France, Switzerland, Germany and Belgium). As living standards in these countries have risen, the trend has reversed and they were a magnet for immigration (most notably from Morocco, Somalia, Egypt to Italy and Greece; from Morocco, Algeria and the Americas to Spain and Portugal; and from Ireland, India, Pakistan, Germany, the United States, Bangladesh, and Jamaica to the United Kingdom).

== Mobility within Europe after the 1985 Schengen Agreement ==
Article 17 of the Schengen Agreement aims at moving internal borders to external borders.

Mobility or mobility of workers is the name given to ease people from one EU country to work into another EU country. The Maastricht treaty name it "the free movement of persons". This is one of the key principles of the European Union.

As a result of the Schengen Agreement, signed on 14 June 1985, there is free travel within part of Europe — known as the Schengen area — for all citizens and residents of all 27 member states; however, non-citizens may only do so for tourism purpose, and for up to three months. Moreover, EU citizens and their families have the right to live and work anywhere within the EU; citizens of non-EU or non-EEA states may obtain a Blue Card or long-term residency.

A large proportion of immigrants in western European states have come from former eastern bloc states in the 1990s, especially in Spain, Greece, Germany, Italy, Portugal and the United Kingdom. There are frequently specific migration patterns, with geography, language and culture playing a role. For example, there are large numbers of Poles who have moved to the United Kingdom and Ireland and Iceland, while Romanians and also Bulgarians have chosen Spain and Italy.

With the earlier of the two recent enlargements of the EU although most countries restricted free movement by nationals of the acceding countries, the United Kingdom did not restrict for the 2004 enlargement of the European Union and received Polish, Latvian and other citizens of the new EU states.

Spain was not restricted for the 2007 enlargement of the European Union, when 9 countries entered Schengen area in 2007, and received many Romanians and Bulgarians as well other citizens of the new EU states.

Many of these Polish immigrants to the UK have since returned to Poland, after the serious economic crisis in the UK. Nevertheless, free movement of EU nationals is now an important aspect of migration within the EU, since there are now 27 member states, and has resulted in serious political tensions between Italy and Romania, since Italy has expressed the intention of restricting free movement of EU nationals (contrary to Treaty obligations and the clear jurisprudence of the European Court of Justice).

Another migration trend has been that of Northern Europeans moving toward Southern Europe. Citizens from the European Union make up a growing proportion of immigrants in Portugal, Spain, South of France, Italy and Greece.

In 2023 and 2024, 3 new countries entered the Schengen area, including Romania and Bulgaria.

== Immigration from outside Europe since the 1980s ==
Syrian and Iraqi refugees are trying to land illegally on the coastal waters of Lesbos in Greece, after crossing from Turkey.

Many immigrants and their descendants have ancestral origins outside the continent. For the former colonial powers France, Britain, the Netherlands, Belgium, Spain, and Portugal, most immigrants and their descendants have ties to former colonies in Africa, the Americas, and Asia. In addition, Germany, Austria, Switzerland, the Netherlands, and Belgium recruited Turkish and Moroccan guest workers beginning in the 1960s, and many current immigrants in those countries today have ties to such recruitment programs.

Moroccan immigrants also began migrating substantially to Spain and Italy for work opportunities in the 1980s. In the Nordic countries of Sweden, Denmark, Norway, and Finland, the bulk of non-Western immigrants are refugees and asylum seekers from the Middle East, East Africa, and other regions of the world arriving since the 1980s and 1990s. Increasing globalization has brought a population of students, professionals, and workers from all over the world into major European cities, most notably London, Paris, and Frankfurt. The introduction of the EU Blue Card in May 2009 further increased the number of skilled professional immigrants from outside of the continent.

Irregular immigration and asylum-seeking in Europe from outside the continent have been occurring since at least the 1990s. While the number of migrants was relatively small for years, it began to rise in 2013. In 2015, the number of asylum seekers arriving from outside Europe increased substantially during the European migrant crisis (see timeline). However, the EU-Turkey deal enacted in March 2016 dramatically reduced this number, and anti-immigrant measures starting in 2017 by the Italian government further cut irregular migration from the Mediterranean route.

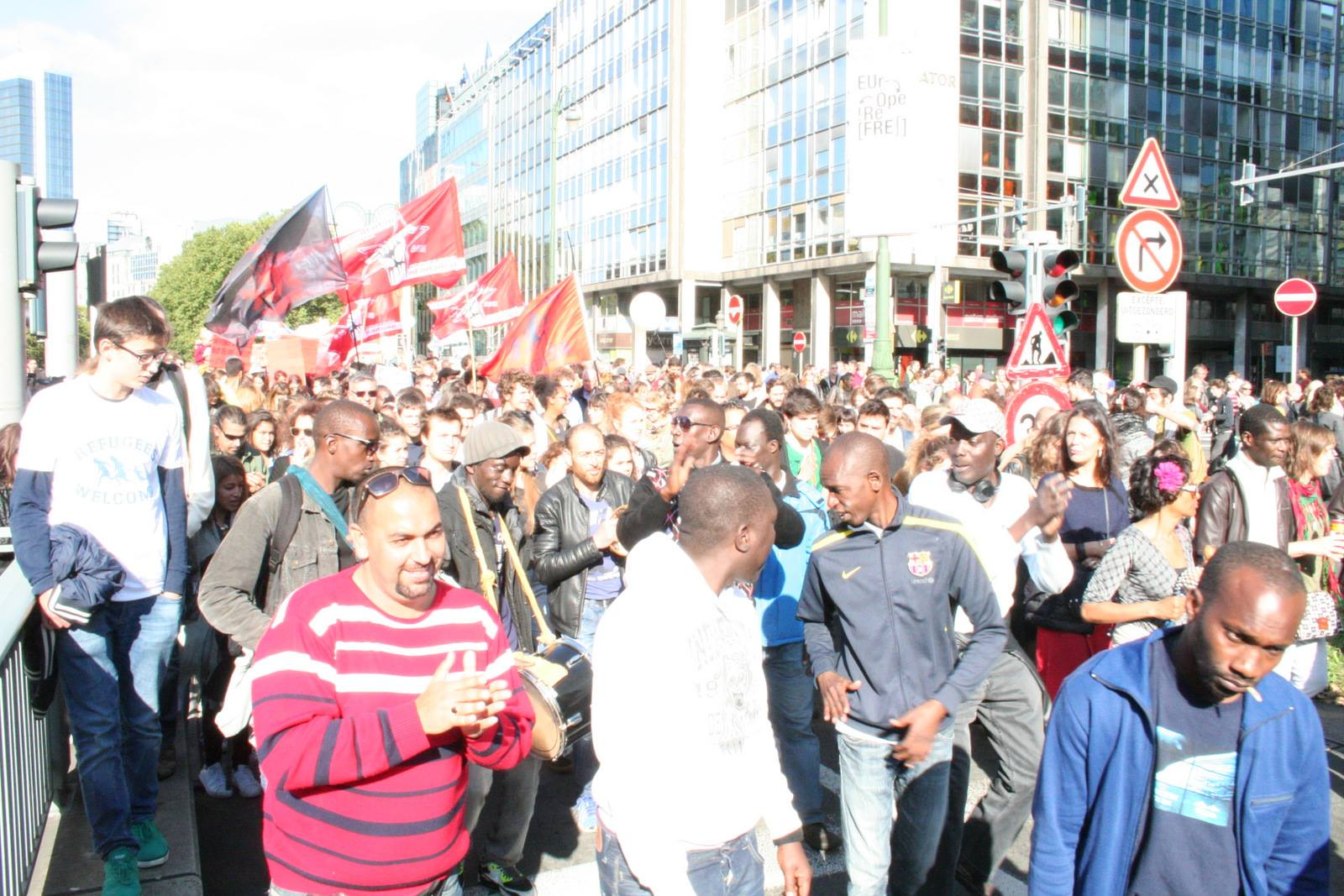
Rally for refugees in Brussels, Belgium, 11 September 2015

Scholars say that the increase in immigration flows from the 1980s is due to global inequalities between poor and rich countries.

In 2017, approximately 825,000 persons acquired citizenship of a member state of the European Union, down from 995,000 in 2016. The largest groups were nationals of Morocco, Albania, India, Turkey and Pakistan.

2.4 million non-EU migrants entered the EU in 2017. In addition, cheaper transportation and more advanced technology have further aided migration.

European Commission President Ursula von der Leyen praised the EU Asylum and Migration Pact as a "huge achievement for Europe". The provisions of the EU Asylum and Migration Pact apply to migrants caught illegally crossing an external EU border, such as those reaching the shores of Greece, Italy or Spain via the Mediterranean Sea or Atlantic Ocean on boats provided by smugglers; estimated at 300,000 migrants in 2023. Provisions do not apply to legal migrants to the EU (~3.5 million in 2023) and migrants who arrived legally but overstayed their visas (~700,000 in 2023).

According to Eurostat, EU countries granted protection status to around 437,900 asylum seekers in 2024.

In January 2026, India and the European Union signed a mobility and migration partnership agreement alongside a free trade agreement to substantially expand and simplify legal pathways to the EU for Indian students and skilled workers.

=== Immigrants in the Nordic countries in 2000–2025 ===
The Nordic countries have differed in their approach to immigration. While Norway and Sweden used to have generous immigration policies, Denmark and Finland had more restricted immigration. Although both Denmark and Finland have experienced a significant increase in their immigrant populations between 2000 and 2020 (6.8% points in Denmark and 5.0% in Finland), Norway (11.9%) and Sweden (11.0%) have seen far greater relative increases.

From 2020 to 2025, Iceland saw the highest increase in their immigrant population (+6.1% points), followed by Finland (+3.8%), Norway (+3.6%) and Denmark (+2.9%), while Sweden saw the lowest increase (+2.2%). In 2024, the Swedish Government reported that, owing to their more restrictive immigration policy, more were leaving Sweden than arriving. This was disputed by the source of their data, Statistics Sweden.

The table below shows the percentage of the total population in the Nordic countries that are either (1) immigrants or (2) children of two immigrant parents:

First and second generation immigrants
Nr	Country	2000	2010	2015	2016	2017	2020	2025
1	Sweden	14.5%	19.1%	21.5%	22.2%	23.2%	25.5%	27.7%
2	Norway	6.3%	11.4%	15.6%	16.3%	16.8%	18.2%	21.8%
3	Iceland	3.2%	8.9%	10.0%	10.8%	12.0%	15.6%	21.7%
5	Finland	2.9%	4.4%	6.2%	6.6%	7.0%	7.9%	11.7%
4	Denmark	7.1%		11.6%	12.3%	12.9%	13.9%	16.8%

==== Denmark ====
For decades, Danish immigration and integration policy were built upon the assumption that with the right kind of help, immigrants and their descendants will eventually tend to the same levels of education and employment as Danes. This assumption was doubted by a 2018 study by the Danish Immigration Service and the Ministry of Education. There are only small differences between children of descendants, descendants and immigrants (arrived in Denmark as 0-12 year olds) of non-Western origin in terms of labor market attachment and education. One of the reasons was that second-generation immigrants from non-Western countries marry someone from their country of origin and so Danish is not spoken at home which disadvantages children in school. Thereby the process of integration has to start from the beginning for each generation.

==== Norway ====
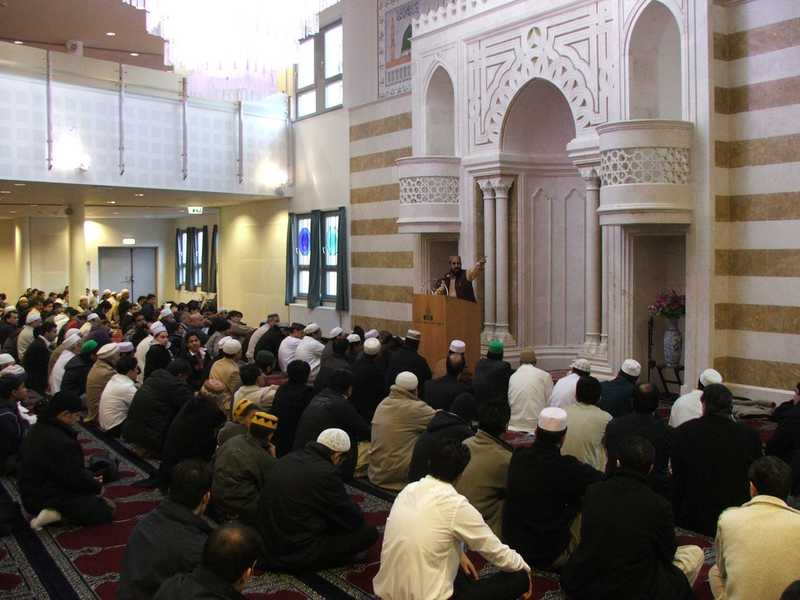
Immigration to Norway has increased the amount of religious minorities, such as these Muslims in Oslo

In January 2015 the "immigrant population" in Norway consisted of approximately 805,000 people, including 669,000 foreign-born and 136,000 born in Norway to two immigrant parents. This corresponds to 15.6% of the total population. The cities with the highest share of immigrants are Oslo (32%) and Drammen (27%).

In 2024, approximately 931,081 individuals (16.8% of the population) of the population of Norway were immigrants. Of these, 386,559 (41.5%) had a Western background, while 544,521 (58.5%) had a non-Western background (Asia, Africa, South and Central America). 221,459 individuals (4% of the population) were children of immigrants, born in Norway. The six largest immigrant groups in Norway are from Poland, Lithuania, Sweden, Syria, Ukraine and Somalia. Children of Pakistani, Polish, Somali, Iraqi and Eritrean parents made up the largest groups of all Norwegians born to immigrant parents.

In the years since 1970, the largest increase in the immigrant population has come from countries in Asia (including Turkey), Africa and South America, increasing from about 3500 in 1970 to about 300,000 in 2011. In the same period, the immigrant population from other Nordic countries and Western Europe has increased modestly from around 42,000 to around 130,000.

==== Sweden ====
Immigrants (red) and emigrants (blue), Sweden 1850-2007

In 2014 the "immigrant population" in Sweden consisted of approximately 2.09 million people, including 1.60 million foreign-born and 489,000 born in Sweden to two immigrant parents. This corresponds to 21.5% of the total population.

Of the major cities Malmö has the largest immigrant population, estimated to be 41.7% in 2014. However, the smaller municipalities Botkyrka (56.2%), Haparanda (55.5%) and Södertälje (49.4%) all have a higher share of immigrants. In the Swedish capital Stockholm 31.1% (in 2014) of the population are either foreign-born or born in Sweden by two foreign-born parents.

In 2014 127,000 people immigrated to Sweden, while 51,000 left the country. Net immigration was 76,000.

Sweden has been transformed from a nation of emigration ending after World War I to a nation of immigration from World War II onwards. In 2009, Sweden had the fourth largest number of asylum applications in the EU and the largest number per capita after Cyprus and Malta. Immigrants in Sweden are mostly concentrated in the urban areas of Svealand and Götaland and the five largest foreign born populations in Sweden come from Finland, Yugoslavia, Iraq, Poland and Iran.

==== Finland ====
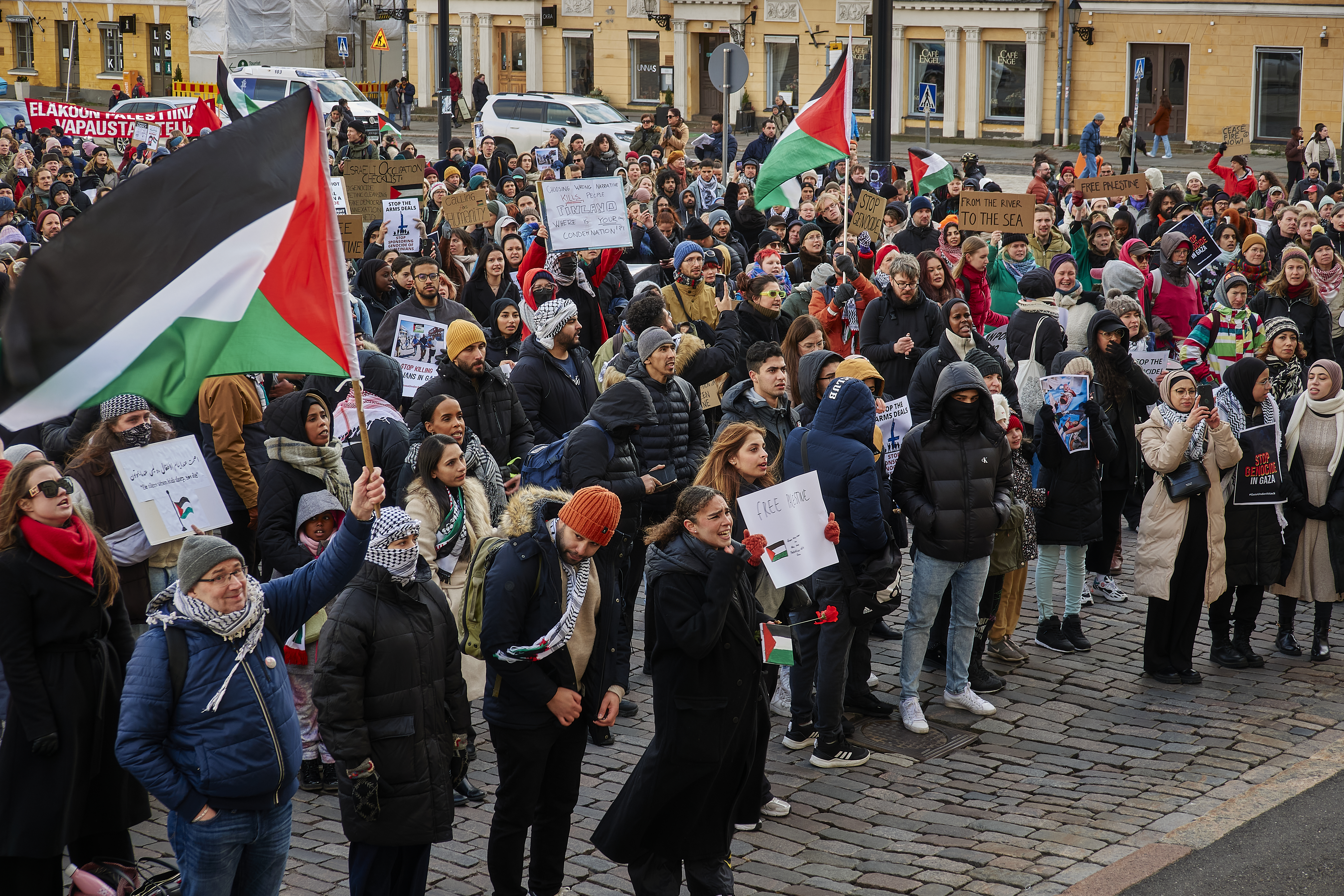
A pro-Palestinian protest in Helsinki, Finland, was attended by people of immigrant background, 21 October 2023.

Immigration has been a major source of population growth and cultural change throughout much of the history of Finland. The economic, social, and political aspects of immigration have caused controversy regarding ethnicity, economic benefits, jobs for non-immigrants, settlement patterns, impact on upward social mobility, crime, and voting behavior.

At the end of 2025, there were 614,401 foreign born people residing in Finland, which corresponds to 10.9% of the population, while there are 660,800 people with a foreign background, corresponding to 11.7% of the population. The largest groups come from Russia, Estonia, Iraq, Somalia, Ukraine, the Philippines, India, former Yugoslavia, China and Iran. Proportionally speaking, Finland has had one of the fastest increases in its foreign-born population between 2000 and 2010 in all of Europe. The majority of immigrants in Finland settle in the Helsinki area, although Tampere, Turku, and Kuopio have had their share of immigrants in recent years. In the city of Vantaa, 41% of 30-44 year olds speak a native language other than Finnish or Swedish.

=== France ===
In 2024, the United Nations estimated 12 million immigrants (foreign-born people) in France, representing 17.2% of the total population, making France the second largest foreign born population in Europe after Germany and tied with the United Kingdom. This is an increase from the United Nations statistics in 2018 in which there were 9 million immigrants (foreign-born people) in France, which at the time represented 14% of the country's total population. As of 2024, around 12 million people living in France, or 17.2% of the population, are first-generation immigrants, while the population with a migrant background in the wider sense stood at approximately 19.2 million, accounting for 30.2% of the total population of 69.4 million.

As of 2008, the French national institute of statistics (INSEE) estimated that 5.3 million foreign-born immigrants and 6.5 million direct descendants of immigrants (born in France with at least one immigrant parent) lived in France. This represents a total of 11.8 million, or 19% of the population. In terms of origin, about 5.5 million are European, four million Maghrebi, one million Sub-Saharan African, and 400,000 Turkish. Among the 5.3 million foreign-born immigrants, 38% are from Europe, 30% from Maghreb, 12.5% from Sub-Saharan Africa, 14.2% from Asia and 5.3% from America and Oceania The most significant countries of origin as of 2008 were Algeria (713,000), Morocco (653,000), Portugal (580,000), Italy (317,000), Spain (257,000), Turkey (238,000) and Tunisia (234,000). However, immigration from Asia (especially China, as well as the former French colonies of Vietnam, Cambodia and Laos), and from Sub-Saharan Africa (Senegal, Mali and others), is gaining in importance.

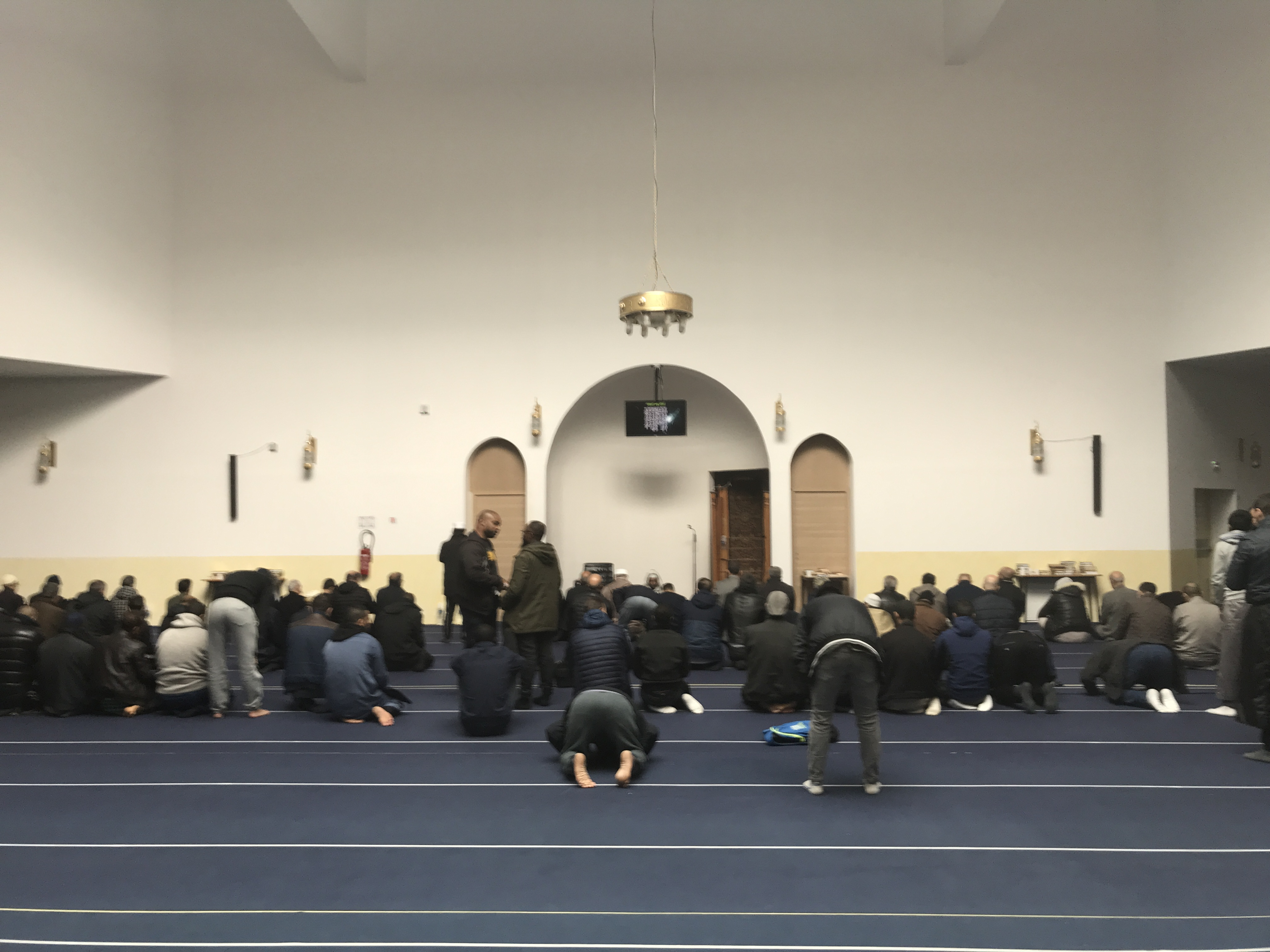
Mosque in Saint-Denis, Paris, 2019

The region with the largest proportion of immigrants is the Île-de-France (Greater Paris), where 40% of immigrants live. Other important regions are Rhône-Alpes (Lyon) and Provence-Alpes-Côte d’Azur (Marseille).

Among the 802,000 newborns in metropolitan France in 2010, 27.3% had at least one foreign-born parent and about one quarter (23.9%) had at least one parent born outside Europe. Including grandparents; almost 40% of newborns in France between 2006 and 2008 had at least one foreign-born grandparent. (11% were born in another European country, 16% in Maghreb, and 12% in another region of the world.)

In 2022, the total number of new foreigners coming to France rose above 320,000 for the first time, with nearly a majority coming from Africa. A significant increase in students, family reunification and labor migration occurred under the presidency of Emmanuel Macron.

=== Germany ===
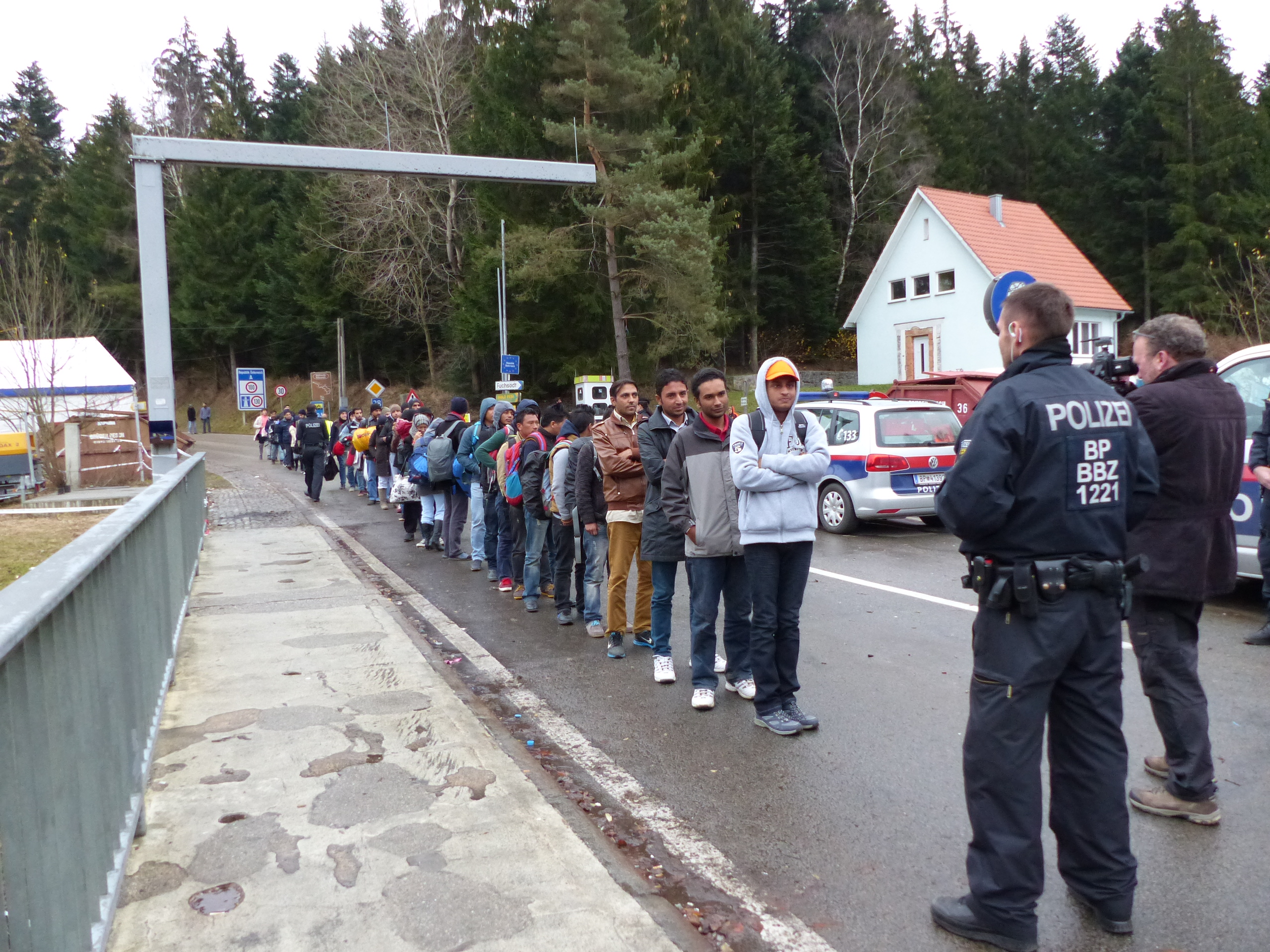
Migrants arriving in Germany during the 2015 European migrant crisis

Nearly 1.1 million refugees and migrants registered in Germany in 2015, mostly people fleeing wars in Syria, Iraq and Afghanistan.

In 2019, 21.2 million people with a migration background lived in Germany, which corresponded to a population share of around 26%.

In December 2021, German Chancellor Olaf Scholz promised to reduce barriers to immigration and make it easier for immigrants to obtain German citizenship. 352,000 people applied for asylum in Germany in 2023, the highest number since 2016, when 722,370 people applied for asylum. People from Ukraine are not included among asylum seekers. Most asylum seekers in 2023 were from Turkey, Syria and Afghanistan.

In 2023, 1,933,000 people immigrated to Germany, including 276,000 from Ukraine and 126,000 from Turkey, while 1,270,000 people emigrated. Net immigration to Germany was 663,000 in 2023, down from a record 1,462,000 in 2022.

On 14 September 2024, Scholz and Kenyan President William Ruto signed an agreement that opened the German labor market to up to 250,000 skilled and semi-skilled migrant workers from Kenya. Scholz's government has already signed migration partnerships with several other countries, including Morocco, Nigeria and India.

=== United Kingdom ===
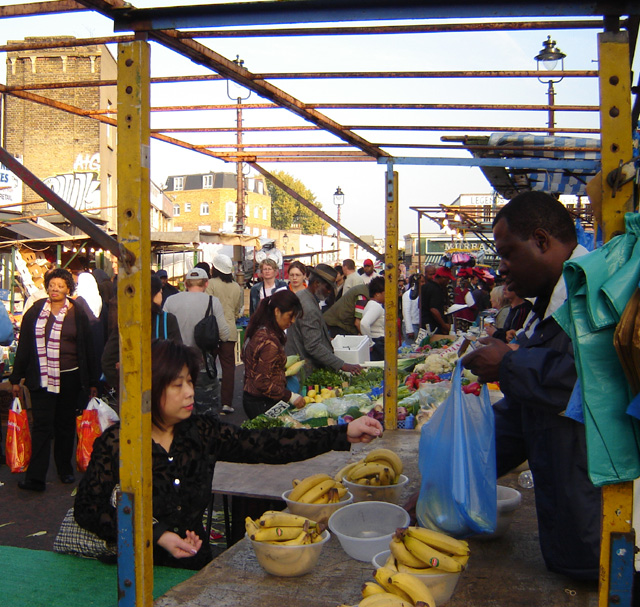
London has become multiethnic as a result of immigration.

In 2014, the number of people who became naturalised British citizens rose to a record 140,795 - a 12% increase from the previous year, and a dramatic increase since 2009. Most new citizens came from Asia (40%) or Africa (32%); the largest three countries of origin were India, Pakistan, and Bangladesh with Indians making the largest group. In 2005, an estimated 565,000 migrants arrived to live in the United Kingdom for at least a year, primarily from Asia and Africa, while 380,000 people emigrated from the country for a year or more, chiefly to Australia, Canada and the United States.

In 2014 the net increase was 318,000: immigration was 641,000, up from 526,000 in 2013, while the number of people emigrating (for more than 12 months) was 323,000.

In 2021, the government launched a scheme for Hongkongers, with more than 200,000 Hong Kong residents immigrating to the UK.

The number of African students increases rapidly for Example only Nigerians studying in the United Kingdom has risen to a high of 44,195 in the 2021/2022 academic year, the latest official data from the Higher Education Statistics Agency (HESA) show. According to the UK agency's data, the number of students enrolment in higher education institutions increased by 107.4 percent in the 2021/2022 academic year from 21,305 in the previous year.

Long-term net migration (the number of people immigrating minus the number emigrating) reached a record high of 764,000 in 2022, with immigration at 1.26 million and emigration at 493,000. Of the 1,218,000 immigrants who came to the United Kingdom in 2023, only 126,000 were EU nationals. Around 250,000 people came from India, 141,000 from Nigeria, 90,000 from China and 83,000 from Pakistan.

=== Italy ===
Foreign residents in Italy as a percentage of the regional population, 2011

In 2021, Istat estimated that 5,171,894 foreign citizens lived in Italy, representing about 8.7% of the total population. These figures include naturalized foreign-born residents (about 1,620,000 foreigners acquired Italian citizenship from 1999 to 2020, of whom 130,000 did so in 2020) as well as illegal immigrants, the so-called clandestini, whose numbers, difficult to determine, are thought to be at least 670,000.

In 2021, around 6,260,000 people residing in Italy have an immigration background (around the 10.6% of the total Italian population).

Starting from the early 1980s, until then a linguistically and culturally homogeneous society, Italy began to attract substantial flows of foreign immigrants. After the fall of the Berlin Wall and, more recently, the 2004 and 2007 enlargements of the European Union, large waves of migration originated from the former socialist countries of Eastern Europe (especially Romania, Albania, Ukraine, Moldova and Poland). Another source of immigration is neighbouring North Africa (in particular, Morocco, Egypt and Tunisia), with soaring arrivals as a consequence of the Arab Spring. Furthermore, in recent years, growing migration fluxes from Asia-Pacific (notably China, South Asia, and the Philippines) and the Americas have been recorded.

Since the expansion of the European Union, the most recent wave of migration has been from surrounding European states, particularly Eastern Europe, and increasingly Asia, replacing North Africa as the major immigration area.

Romanians made up the largest foreign community in the country (1,077,876; around 10% of them being ethnic Romani people) followed by Albanians (433,130) and Moroccans (428,940). The fourth largest, but the fastest growing, community of foreign residents in Italy was represented by the Chinese; as of 2021 there were 330,495 foreigners holding Chinese citizenship. The majority of Chinese living in Italy are from the city of Wenzhou in the province of Zhejiang. As of 2021, foreign citizens' origins were subdivided as follows: Europe (47,6%), Africa (22.25%), Asia (22.64%), The Americas (7.49%), and Oceania (0.04%).

The distribution of foreigners is largely uneven in Italy: in 2020, 61.2% of foreign citizens lived in Northern Italy (in particular 36.1% in Northwestern Italy and 25.1% in Northeastern Italy), 24.2% in Central Italy, 10.8% in Southern Italy and 3.9% in Insular Italy.

The children born in Italy to foreign mothers were 102,000 in 2012, 99,000 in 2013 and 97,000 in 2014.

The Meloni government authorised more than 450,000 entries for non-EU workers between 2023 and 2025. In July 2025, the government approved plans to authorise 497,550 entries for non-EU workers for the 2026–2028 period, including 164,850 in 2026. The quotas are reserved for selected countries, primarily located in Asia, Africa, and the Western Balkans.

=== Spain ===
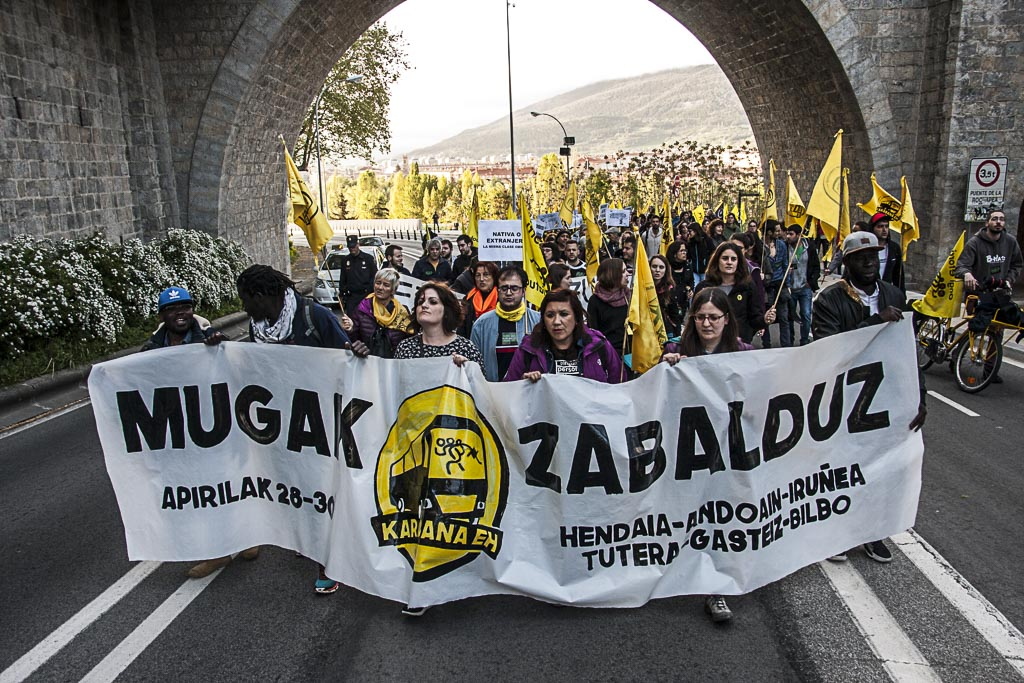
Caravan protesting European closed borders policies in Pamplona

Since 2000, Spain has received around six million immigrants, adding 12% to the population in the country. The total immigrant population in the country now exceeds 5,730,677 (12.2% of the total population). According to residence permit data for 2011, more than 981,823 were Moroccan (The first nationality of Immigrants in Spain.), another 410,000 were Ecuadorian, 300,000 were Colombian, 230,000 were Bolivian and 150,000 were Chinese; from the EU around 535,935 were Romanian, 297,229 were British, 190,000 were German, 170,000 were Italian and 160,000 were Bulgarian. A 2005 regularisation programme increased the legal immigrant population by 700,000 people that year. By world regions, in 2006 there were around 2,300,000 from the EU-27, 1,600,000 from South America, 1,000,000 from Africa, 300,000 from Asia, 200,000 from Central America & Caribbean, 200,000 from the rest of Europe, while 50,000 from North America and 3,000 from the rest of the world.

Another migratory trend has been that of northern Europeans heading towards southern Europe. (The first group of immigrants in Spain are Moroccans) European Union citizens constitute a growing proportion of immigrants, in Spain, they came mainly from the United Kingdom and Germany, On the contrary, since 2014 many Britons have left Spain and because of Brexit Many Britons leave Spain.

The Sánchez government planned to legalize around 900,000 undocumented migrants by 2027.

In late July 2026, Spain faced a significant migration crisis during the Morocco–Spain border incident, when an estimated 80,000 people crossed the border from Morocco into the autonomous city of Ceuta.

=== Portugal ===
Portugal, long a country of emigration, has now become a country of net immigration, from both its former colonies and other sources. In 2022, legal immigrants represented about 7% of the population, and the largest communities were from Brazil, the United Kingdom, Cabo Verde, India, Italy, Angola, France, and Ukraine. As of 2024, according to the latest official report, legal immigrants now represent 14.4% of the population. The largest community is still from Brazil (which represents more than 30% of the foreign population), being now followed by India, Angola, Ukraine, Cabo Verde, Nepal, Bangladesh, and the UK.

=== Netherlands ===
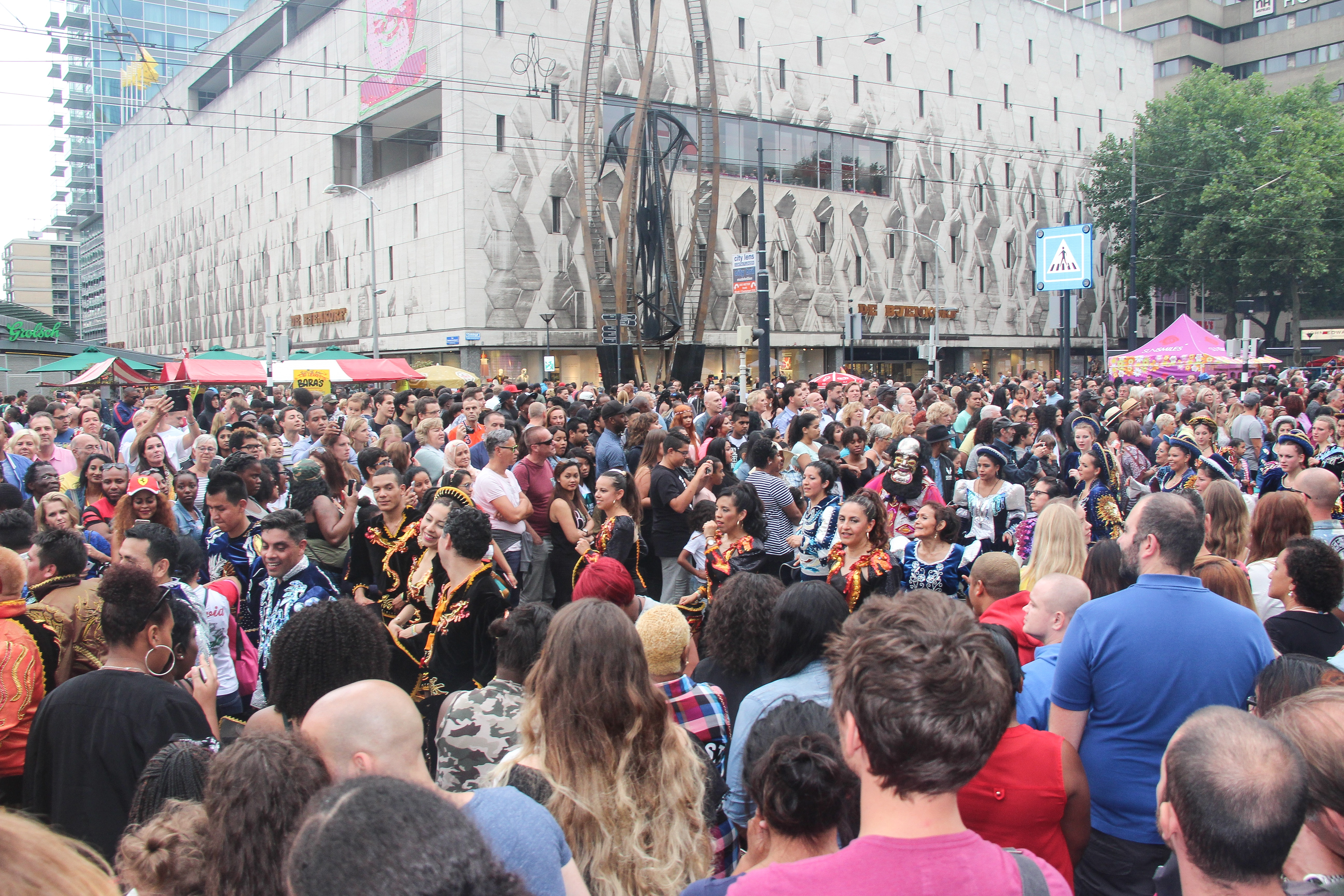
In Rotterdam almost half the population has an immigrant background.

According to Eurostat, in 2010 there were 1.8 million foreign-born residents in the Netherlands, corresponding to 11.1% of the total population. Of these, 1.4 million (8.5%) were born outside the EU and 0.43 million (2.6%) were born in another EU Member State. In 2022, there were 4.4 million residents in the Netherlands with at least one foreign-born parent. Over half the young people in Amsterdam and Rotterdam have a non-western background. In 2022, 403,100 persons immigrated to the Netherlands, up from 252,528 in 2021.

=== Slovenia ===
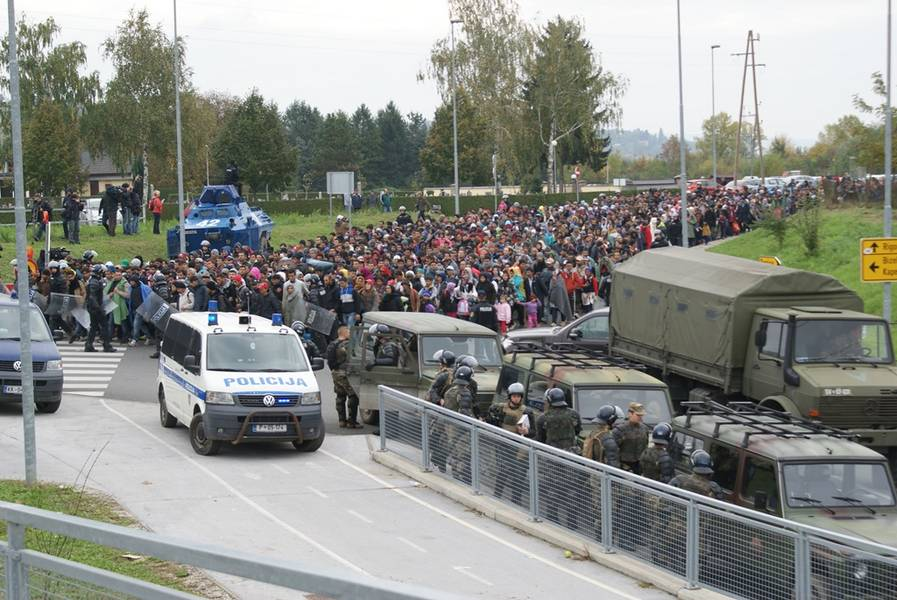
Middle East migrants pass through Slovenia on their way to Germany, 22 October 2015.

On 1 January 2011 there were almost 229,000 people (11.1%) living in Slovenia with foreign country of birth. At the end of March 2002 when data on the country of birth for total population were for the first and last time collected by a conventional (field) census, the number was almost 170,000 (8.6%). Immigration from abroad, mostly from republics of former Yugoslavia, was the deciding factor for demographic and socioeconomic development of Slovenia in the last fifty years. Also after independence of Slovenia the direction of migration flows between Slovenia and abroad did not change significantly. Migration topics remain closely connected with the territory of former Yugoslavia. Slovenia was and still is the destination country for numerous people from the territory of former Yugoslavia. The share of residents of Slovenia with countries of birth from the territory of former Yugoslavia among all foreign-born residents was 88.9% at the 2002 Census and on 1 January 2011 despite new migration flows from EU Member States and from non-European countries still 86.7%.

=== Other countries ===
- Immigration to Austria
- Immigration to Belgium
- Immigration to Bulgaria
- Immigration to Denmark
- Immigration to Germany
- Immigration to Greece
- Immigration to Iceland
- Immigration to Romania
- Immigration to Switzerland
- Immigration to Turkey

== Opposition ==
National governments' position on 22 September 2015 European Union Justice and Home Affairs Council majority vote to relocate 120,000 refugees from Greece and Italy to other EU countries according to proportional quotas: Yes Opt-out Abstention No Non-EU state *Malta not seen/marked on map

Since the years 1970s–1980s, the European continent has seenunauthorized immigrants from Africa, the Middle East, and other regions of the world, primarily arriving in the countries of Southern Europe (such as Spain, Italy, Greece, and Malta). Among the member states of the European Union, "migration constitutes the greatest concern to EU citizens".

According to a Yougov poll in 2018, majorities in all seven polled countries were opposed to accepting more migrants: Germany (72%), Denmark (65%), Finland (64%), Sweden (60%), United Kingdom (58%), France (58%), and Norway (52%).

A February 2017 poll of 10,000 people in 10 European countries by Chatham House found on average a majority (55%) were opposed to further Muslim immigration, with opposition especially pronounced in a number of countries: Poland (71%), Austria (65%), Hungary (64%), Belgium (64%), and France (61%). Except for Poland, all of those had recently suffered jihadist terror attacks or been at the centre of a refugee crisis. Of those opposed to further Muslim immigration, 3/4 classify themselves as on the right of the political spectrum. Of those self-classifying as on the left of the political spectrum, 1/3 supported a halt.

=== Belarus ===
In April 2025, after meeting with Pakistani Prime Minister Shehbaz Sharif in Minsk, Belarusian President Alexander Lukashenko announced a plan to open Belarus to 150,000 migrant workers from Pakistan. Lukashenko's migration plans have raised concerns in neighboring Poland and among the Belarusian public. Belarusian authorities have cracked down on online opponents of Pakistani immigration to Belarus and arrested the most vocal critics of Lukashenko's immigration policies.

=== Denmark ===
In Denmark, the parliamentary party most strongly associated with anti-immigration policies is the Danish People's Party.

According to a Gallup poll in 2017, two out of three (64%) wished for limiting immigration from Muslim countries which was an increase from 2015 (54%).

According to a 2018 Yougov poll, 65% of Danes opposed accepting more migrants into the country.

On 14 August 2020, the Ministry of Immigration and Integration in Denmark revealed that it denied 83 people Danish citizenship in the past two years because they have committed serious crimes.

=== Finland ===
According to a 2018 Yougov poll, 64% of Finns opposed accepting more migrants into the country.

In November 2020, Swedish crime trends were used as an example not to follow by the Finns Party who claimed both Sweden and Finland's problem with youth crime were the result of failed immigration policies.

=== France ===
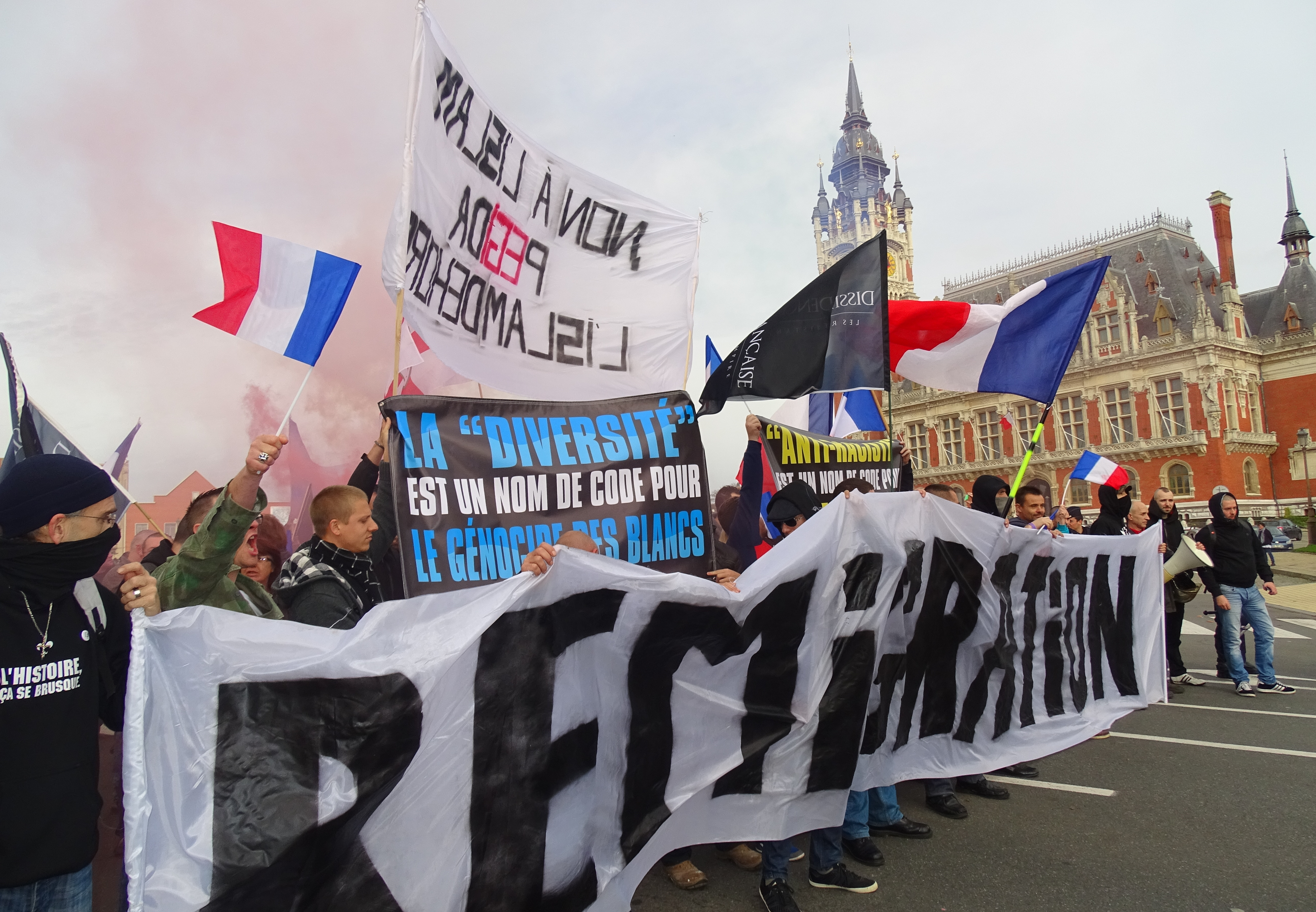
Anti-immigrant protesters in Calais hold a sign in French reading "Diversity is a code word for white genocide", above a banner calling for remigration.

In France, the National Front seeks to limit immigration. Major media, political parties, and a large share of the public believe that anti-immigration sentiment has increased since the country's riots of 2005.

According to a 2018 Yougov poll, 58% of the French opposed accepting more migrants into the country.

=== Germany ===
In Germany, the conservative CDU, the left-wing populist BSW, the far-right and the right-wing populist Alternative for Germany and the neo-Nazi National Democratic Party oppose immigration.

In 2018, a poll by Pew Research found that a majority (58%) wanted fewer immigrants to be allowed into the country, 30% wanted to keep the current level and 10% wanted to increase immigration.

According to a 2018 Yougov poll, 72% of Germans opposed accepting more migrants into the country.

The 2015–16 New Year's Eve sexual assaults in Cologne ended the atmosphere of euphoria earlier in the year when hundreds of thousands of migrants had arrived in Germany. Four violent crimes committed during the week of 18 July 2016, three of them by asylum seekers, created significant political pressure for changes in the Angela Merkel administration policy of welcoming refugees. The Siegaue rape case as well as the murders of Mia Valentin and Susanna Feldmann intensified the discussion about admitting migrants. The 2024 Solingen stabbing has reignited debates over migration policies in Germany ahead of upcoming regional elections.

=== Greece ===
In February 2020, more than 10,000 individuals attempted to cross the border between Greece and Turkey after Turkish president Recep Tayyip Erdoğan opened its border to Europe, but they were blocked by Greek army and police forces. Hundreds of Greek soldiers and armed police resisted the trespassers and fired tear gas at them. Among those who attempted to cross were individuals from Africa, Iran and Afghanistan. Greece responded by refusing to accept asylum applications for a month.

In March 2020, migrants set fires and threw Molotov cocktail firebombs over to the Greek side in order to break down the border fence. Greek and European forces responded with tear gas and by trying to keep the fence intact. By 11 March 348 people had been arrested and 44,353 cases of unlawful entry had been prevented.

=== Italy ===
Public anti-immigrant discourse started in Italy in 1985 by the Bettino Craxi government, which in a public speech drew a direct link between the high number of clandestine immigrants and some terrorist incidents. Public discourse by the media hold that the phenomenon of immigration is uncontrollable and of undefined proportions.

According to poll published by Corriere della Sera, one of two respondents (51%) approved closing Italy's ports to further boat migrants arriving via the Mediterranean, while 19% welcomed further boat migrants.

In 2018, a poll by Pew Research found that a majority (71%) wanted fewer immigrants to be allowed into the country, 18% wanted to keep the current level and 5% wanted to increase immigration.

=== Norway ===
In Norway, the only parliamentary party that seeks to limit immigration is the Progress Party. Minor Norwegian parties seeking to limit immigration are the Democrats in Norway, the Christian Unity Party, the Pensioners' Party and the Coastal Party.

According to a 2018 Yougov poll, 52% of Norwegians opposed accepting more migrants into the country.

=== Poland ===
A 2015 opinion poll conducted by the Centre for Public Opinion Research (CBOS) found that 14% thought that Poland should let asylum-seekers enter and settle in Poland, 58% thought Poland should let asylum-seekers stay in Poland until they can return to their home country, and 21% thought Poland should not accept asylum-seekers at all. Furthermore, 53% thought Poland should not accept asylum-seekers from the Middle East and North Africa, with only 33% thinking Poland should accept them.

Another opinion poll conducted by the same organisation found that 86% of Poles think that Poland does not need more immigrants, with only 7% thinking Poland needs more immigrants.

Despite Polish public sentiment, 683,000 immigrants from outside of the EU arrived in Poland in 2017, with 87.4% of them immigrating for work. This was the highest number of residence permits granted by an EU member state that year.

=== Portugal ===
Portugal had little immigration until a sudden influx in the 1970s, as ex-colonists, most of them ethnically white, returned. After the former Portuguese African colonies gained independence, and because nationals of Portuguese-speaking nations can freely live and work in Portugal without much bureaucracy, an incremental growth of immigration from Portugal's former overseas possessions was observed over the past few decades, primarily from Brazil, Cape Verde, Angola and Mozambique. The country now has nearly 240,000 Brazilians and about 350,000 people born in an African country. Although immigrants are mostly concentrated in urban and suburban areas, mainly on Portugal's coast, Portuguese authorities have in recent times encouraged immigration, notably from Brazil, to rural areas, in an effort to increase an ever shrinking population. The growth of the number of immigrants has been linked to an escalation of anti-immigration sentiments and protests throughout Portugal since the mids 2000's.

Until recently, far-right party "National Renewal Party", known as PNR, was the only one in Portugal which actively targeted the mass-immigration and ethnic minorities (mainly related to Gypsy and African communities) issues. After years of growing support—0.09% 4,712 2002, 0.16% 9,374 2005, 0.20% 11,503 2009, 0.31% 17,548 2011— it managed 0.50%, or 27,269, of the electorate in the 2015 Portuguese legislative election. Since 2019, far-right political party Chega has gained traction in the country. Following the 2019 Portuguese legislative election, the party's president, André Ventura, assured a seat in Assembly of the Republic, after having received over 66,000 votes, 1,3% of the electorate. In the 2020 Azorean regional election, the party secured two assemblyman to the regional parliament and, during the 2021 Portuguese presidential election, André Ventura managed to gather approximately 500,000 votes, 12% of the total. The party opposes immigration and has been described by the media and mainstream parties as xenophobic. Chega has an estimated 28,000 militant members and is expected to continue to rise in popularity and political force.

=== Slovakia ===
In October 2024, Slovak Prime Minister Robert Fico criticized the European Union's migration policies, specifically targeting the low rate of deportations for individuals residing in the bloc illegally. Speaking at a summit on 22 October 2024, alongside Hungarian Prime Minister Viktor Orbán and Serbian President Aleksandar Vučić, Fico emphasized that the "fight against illegal migration" is an absolute priority. During this summit, Orbán corroborated Fico's stance by stating that out of approximately 430,000 decisions to expel illegal migrants in the EU in the previous year, only 84,000 were actually implemented—supporting Fico's claim that roughly 80% of those ordered to leave remain in Europe while only 20% are successfully returned.

=== Spain ===
A January 2004 survey by Spanish newspaper El País found that the "majority" of Spaniards believed immigration was too high.

In Spain, as of 2005, surveys found "in descending order, jobs, crime and housing" were the primary concerns for citizens opposed to immigration.

In 2024, Alberto Núñez Feijóo, leader of Spain's conservative Popular Party (PP) and head of the main opposition group, criticized the immigration policy of the Sánchez government. He accused Prime Minister Pedro Sánchez of "promoting Spain as a destination" for migrants rather than addressing the root causes by going to Africa to "combat the (migration) mafia." In 2026, Feijóo further condemned the Spanish government's proposal to legalize approximately 500,000 undocumented immigrants.

In 2026, the Vox party launched a legal challenge in Spain's Supreme Court against the government's plan to regularize hundreds of thousands of undocumented migrants.

In July 2026, following the Morocco–Spain border incident, Italian Prime Minister Giorgia Meloni called for Spain to be suspended from the EU's visa-free Schengen Area. Writing on X, she said that "uncontrolled illegal immigration poses a real threat to the security of Europe's borders." Spanish Prime Minister Pedro Sánchez rejected the criticism and argued on X that Italy had received significantly more migrants than Spain since 2021, citing approximately 478,000 undocumented migrants arriving in Italy as opposed to 234,000 in Spain.

According to an October 2024 survey for the El País newspaper and Cadena SER radio station, 57% of Spaniards believe there is "too much" immigration to Spain.

=== Sweden ===
In response to the high immigration of 2015, the anti-immigration party Sweden Democrats rose to 19.9% in the Statistics Sweden poll.

In late 2015, Sweden introduced temporary border checks on the Øresund Bridge between Denmark and Sweden and public transport operators were instructed to only let people with residence in Sweden board trains or buses. The measures reduced the number of asylum seekers from 163 000 in 2015 to 29 000 in 2016.

In 2018, a poll by Pew Research found that a small majority (52%) wanted fewer immigrants to be allowed into the country, 33% wanted to keep the current level and 14% wanted to increase immigration.

According to a 2018 Yougov poll, 60% of Swedes opposed accepting more migrants into the country.

In February 2020 finance minister Magdalena Andersson encouraged migrants to head for other countries than Sweden. Andersson stated in an interview that integration of immigrants in Sweden wasn't working since neither before nor after 2015 and that Sweden cannot accept more immigration than it is able to integrate.

After the 2022 general election, the Swedish government saw a surge in support for right-wing parties, notably bolstered by the rise of anti-immigration sentiments.

=== Switzerland ===
During the 1990s under Christoph Blocher, the Swiss People's Party started to develop an increasingly eurosceptic and anti-immigration agenda. In 2014, they launched a popular initiative titled "Against mass immigration" that was narrowly accepted. They are currently the largest party in the National Council with 53 seats.

=== United Kingdom ===
Anti-immigration sentiment in the United Kingdom has historically focused on non-indigenous African, Afro-Caribbean and especially South Asian migrants, all of whom began to arrive from the Commonwealth of Nations in greater numbers following World War II. Since the fall of the Soviet Union and the enlargement of the European Union, the increased movement of people out of countries such as Poland, Romania and Lithuania has shifted much of this attention towards migrants from Eastern Europe. While working-class migrants tend to be the focus of anti-immigration sentiment, there is also some discontent about Russian, Chinese, Singaporean and Gulf Arab multimillionaires resident in the UK, particularly in London and South East England. These residents often invest in property and business, and are perceived as living extravagant "jet-set" lifestyles marked by conspicuous consumption while simultaneously taking advantage of tax loopholes connected to non-dom status.

Policies of reduced immigration, particularly from the European Union, are central to the manifestos of parties such as the UK Independence Party. Such policies have also been discussed by some members of the largest parties in Parliament, most significantly the Conservatives.

Following revised November 2024 data showing net immigration to the United Kingdom reached a record 906,000 for the year ending June 2023, Reform UK leader Nigel Farage described the figures as "horrendous," stating he had had "enough of being lied to" by the Conservatives and claiming the situation would be "even worse" under Labour. Conservative leader Kemi Badenoch stated that the Conservative Party had "got it wrong" on immigration during their time in power because post-Brexit openings of new non-EU visa routes caused net migration to reach record highs despite ending EU freedom of movement, prompting her to announce a new policy under her leadership that will include a "strict numerical cap" on immigration, tighter access to British passports, and a "zero tolerance" policy on foreign criminals remaining in the United Kingdom.

== Great Replacement ==
The Great Replacement (French: grand remplacement), also known as replacement theory or great replacement theory, is a debunked white nationalist far-right conspiracy theory coined by French author Renaud Camus. Camus's theory states that, with the complicity or cooperation of "replacist" elites, (Note: French: pouvoir/élite remplaciste) the ethnic French and white European populations are deliberately being replaced by non-white peoples—especially from Muslim-majority countries—through mass migration, demographic growth, and a drop in the birth rate of white Europeans. Similar claims have been advanced in other national contexts, notably in the United States. A consensus of academic scholars have dismissed these claims of a conspiracy of "replacist" elites as rooted in a misunderstanding of demographic statistics and premised upon an unscientific, racist worldview.

While similar themes have characterized various far-right theories since the late 19th century, the particular term was popularized by Camus in his 2011 book Le Grand Remplacement. The book associates the presence of Muslims in France with danger and destruction of French culture and civilization. Camus and other conspiracy theorists attribute recent demographic changes in Europe to intentional policies advanced by global and liberal elites (the "replacists") from within the Government of France, the European Union, or the United Nations; they describe it as a "genocide by substitution".

== Statistics ==
=== By host country ===
==== Statistics for European Union 27 (post-Brexit) ====
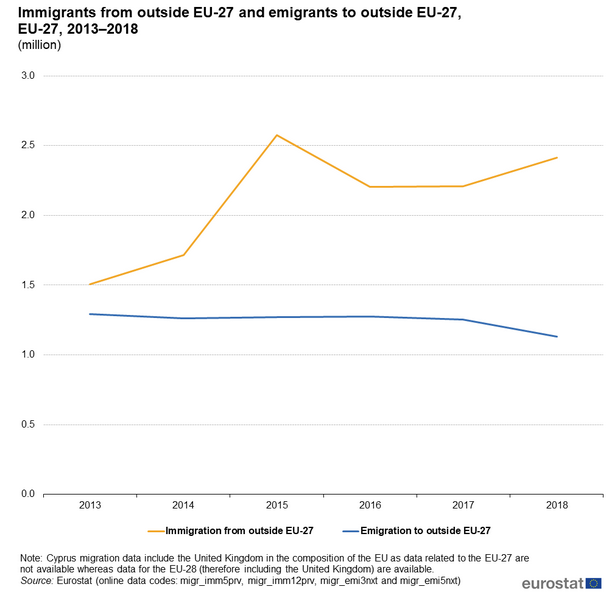
Immigration and emigration between EU-27 countries and non-EU-27 countries. Source: Eurostat 2020

EU-27 data source Eurostat.
Country	Refused entry	illegally present	Order to leave	Returned outside the EU
EU 27 (2018)	454600		456700	145900
EU 27 (2019)	717600	627900	491200	142300
2018-2019 change (%)	+58%	+10%	+8%	-2.5%

==== 2013 UN data ====
This is a list of European countries by immigrant population, based on the United Nations report Trends in International Migrant Stock: The 2013 Revision.

Country	Number of immigrants	Percentage of total number of immigrants in the world	Immigrants as percentage of national population
Russia	11,048,064	4.8	7.7
Germany	9,845,244	4.3	11.9
France	7,839,086	3.4	12.4
United Kingdom	7,824,131	3.4	12.4
Spain	5,891,208	2.8	9.6 (2016)
Italy	5,721,457	2.5	9.4
Ukraine	5,151,378	2.2	11.4
Switzerland	2,335,059	1.0	28.9
Netherlands	1,964,922	0.9	11.7
Turkey	1,864,889	0.8	2.5
Sweden	1,130,025	0.7	15.9
Austria	1,333,807	0.6	15.7
Belgium	1,159,801	0.5	10.4
Belarus	1,085,396	0.5	11.6
Greece	988,245	0.4	8.9
Portugal	893,847	0.4	8.4
Croatia	756,980	0.3	17.6
Ireland	735,535	0.3	15.9
Norway	694,508	0.3	13.8
Poland	663,755	0.3	0.9
Denmark	556,825	0.3	9.9
Serbia	532,457	0.3	5.6
Hungary	449,632	0.3	4.7
Finland	446,434	0.3	8.1
Czech Republic	439,116	0.2	4.0
Moldova	391,508	0.2	11.2
Azerbaijan	411,843	0.2	3.4
Armenia	317,001	0.2	10.6
Latvia	282,887	0.2	13.8
Slovenia	233,293	0.2	11.3
Luxembourg	229,409	0.1	43.3
Estonia	209,984	0.1	16.4
Cyprus	207,313	0.1	18.2
Romania	198,839	0.1	0.9
Georgia	189,893	0.1	4.4
Lithuania	147,781	0.1	4.9
North Macedonia	139,751	0.1	6.6
Albania	96,798	0.1	3.1
Bulgaria	84,101	0.1	1.2
Andorra	45,086	0.1	56.9
Isle of Man	44,688	0.1	52.0
Iceland	34,377	0.1	10.7
Monaco	24,299	0.1	64.2
Bosnia and Herzegovina	23,197	0.1	0.6
Liechtenstein	12,208	0.1	33.1
Gibraltar	9,662	0.1	33.0
San Marino	4,399	0.1	15.4
Vatican City	799	0.1	100.0

==== 2010 data for European Union 28 ====
In 2010, 47.3 million people lived in the EU, who were born outside their resident country. This corresponds to 9.4% of the total EU population. Of these, 31.4 million (6.3%) were born outside the EU and 16.0 million (3.2%) were born in another EU member state. The largest absolute numbers of people born outside the EU were in Germany (6.4 million), France (5.1 million), the United Kingdom (4.7 million), Spain (4.1 million), Italy (3.2 million), and The Netherlands (1.4 million).

State	Total population (millions)	Population by birth location					
State	Total population (millions)	Foreign		Other EU state		Non-EU state	
State	Total population (millions)	Total (millions)	%	Total (millions)	%	Total (millions)	%
Germany	81.802	9.812	12.0	3.396	4.2	6.415	7.8
France	64.716	7.196	11.1	2.118	3.3	5.078	7.8
United Kingdom	62.008	7.012	11.3	2.245	3.6	4.767	7.7
Spain	46.000	6.422	14.0	2.328	5.1	4.094	8.9
Italy	61.000	4.798	8.5	1.592	2.6	3.205	5.3
Netherlands	16.575	1.832	11.1	0.428	2.6	1.404	8.5
Greece	11.305	0.960	9.6	0.320	2.3	0.640	6.3
Ireland	3.758	0.766	20.0	0.555	14.8	0.211	5.6
Sweden	9.340	1.337	14.3	0.477	5.1	0.859	9.2
Austria	8.367	1.276	15.2	0.512	6.1	0.764	9.1
Belgium	10.666	1.380	12.9	0.695	6.5	0.685	6.4
Portugal	10.637	0.793	7.5	0.191	1.8	0.602	5.7
Denmark	5.534	0.500	9.0	0.152	2.8	0.348	6.3
Slovenia	2.050	0.228	11.1	0.021	1.8	0.207	9.3
EU 28	501.098	47.348	9.4	15.980	3.2	31.368	6.3

==== 2005 UN data ====
According to the United Nations report World Population Policies 2005, European countries that have the highest net foreign populations are:

Country	Population	Percentage	Notes
Russia	12,080,000	8.5	
Germany	10,144,000	12.3	
Ukraine	6,833,000	14.7	
France	6,471,000	10.2	
United Kingdom	5,408,000	9	
Italy	5,000,000	8.2	
Spain	4,790,000	10.8	
Switzerland	1,660,000	23	
Netherlands	1,638,000	10	
Austria	1,234,000	15	

The European countries with the highest proportion or percentage of non-native residents are small nations or microstates. Andorra is the country in Europe with the highest percentage of immigrants, 77% of the country's 82,000 inhabitants. Monaco is the second with the highest percentage of immigrants, they make up 70% of the total population of 32,000; and Luxembourg is the third, immigrants are 37% of the total of 480,000; in Liechtenstein they are 35% of the 34,000 people; and in San Marino they comprise 32% of the country's population of 29,000.

Countries in which immigrants form between 25% and 10% of the population are: Switzerland (23%), Latvia (19%), Estonia (15%), Austria (15%), Croatia (15%), Ukraine (14.7%), Cyprus (14.3%), Ireland (14%), Moldova (13%), Germany (12.3%), Sweden (12.3%), Belarus (12%), Slovenia (11.1%), Spain (10.8%, 12.2% in 2010), France (10.2%), and the Netherlands (10%). The United Kingdom (9%), Greece (8.6%), Russia (8.5%), Finland (8.1%), Iceland (7.6%), Norway (7.4%), Portugal (7.2%), Denmark (7.1%), Belgium (6.9%) and the Czech Republic (6.7%), each have a proportion of immigrants between 10% and 5% of the total population.

==== 2006 data ====
Eurostat data reported in 2006 that Spain was the member state with the largest number of foreign immigrants: 803,000. The EU in 2005 had an overall net gain from international migration of 1.8 million people, which accounted for almost 85% of Europe's total population growth that year. In 2004, a total of 140,033 people immigrated to France. Of them, 90,250 were from Africa and 13,710 from elsewhere in Europe. In 2005, the total number of immigrants fell slightly, to 135,890.

=== By origin ===
==== In 2019 ====
In the European Union, in 2019, 706 400 persons acquired citizenship, the main nation of origin for citizenship grant were by decreasing number: Morocco, Albania, the United Kingdom, Syria and Turkey.

the largest groups were Moroccans (66 800, or 9.5 %), followed by Albanians (41 700, or 5.9 %), Britons (29 800, or 4.2 %), Syrian (29 100, or 4.1 %) and Turks (28 600, or 4.0 %). The majority of Moroccans acquired citizenship of Spain (37 %), Italy (24 %) or France (24 %), while the majority of Albanians received Italian citizenship (62 %). Almost half of the Britons received German citizenship (46 %) and more than half of the Syrians received Swedish citizenship (69 %). The majority of Turks acquired German citizenship (57 %)

— eurostat

==== Previous years ====
This is a breakdown by major area of origin of the 72.4 million migrants residing in Europe (out of a population of 742 million) at mid-2013, based on the United Nations report Trends in International Migrant Stock: The 2013 Revision.

Area of origin	Number of immigrants to Europe (millions)	Percentage of total number of immigrants to Europe
Africa	8.9	12
Asia	18.6	27
Europe	37.8	52
the Americas and the Caribbean	4.5	6
North America	0.9	1
Oceania	0.3	0.4
Various	1.3	2
TOTAL	72.4	100

Approximate populations of non-European origin in Europe (about 20 - 30+ millions, or 3 - 4% (depending on the definition of non-European origin), out of a total population of approx. 831 million):

- Black Africans (including Afro-Caribbeans and others by descent): approx. 9 to 10 million in the European Union and around 12.5 in Europe as a whole. Between 5 and 6 million Sub-Saharan and Afro-Caribbeans live in France but also 2.5 million in the United Kingdom, Italy, Germany, Spain, Belgium, the Netherlands and Portugal. (in Spain and Portugal Afro-Caribbean are included in )
- Turks (including Turks from Turkey and Northern Cyprus): approx. 9 million (this estimate does not include the 10 million Turks within the European portion of Turkey); of whom 3 to over 7 million in Germany but also the rest in France and the Netherlands with over 2 million Turks in France and Turks in the Netherlands, Austria, the United Kingdom, Belgium, Sweden, Switzerland, Denmark, Italy, Bulgaria, Macedonia, Greece, Romania, Finland, Serbia and Norway. (see Turks in Europe)
- Arabs (including North African and Middle Eastern Arabs): approx. 6 to 7 million Arabs live in France but also 1.2 million Arabs in Germany, the United Kingdom, Spain, Italy, Greece, Sweden, the Netherlands, Denmark, Belgium, Norway, Switzerland, Finland and Russia (see Arabs in Europe).
- Indians: approx. 2.5 million; 1.9 million mostly in the United Kingdom but also 473,520 in France including the overseas territories, 240,000 in the Netherlands, 203,052 in Italy, 185,085 in Germany, Ireland and Portugal.
- Pakistanis: approx. 1.1 million in the United Kingdom, but also 120,000 in France, 118,181 in Italy, Spain, and Norway.
- Bengali: approx. 600,000 mostly in United Kingdom, but also 85,000 in Italy, 35,000 in France, Spain, Sweden, Finland and Greece.
- The Americas (includes Afro Americans, Afro-Caribbeans, Native Americans, White Americans, Mestizos and other mixed-race peoples, etc.): approx. 5.0 million; mostly in Spain (c. 2.9 million) but also 1.3 million in France, 354,180 in Italy, +100,000 in Portugal, 245,000 in the United Kingdom and some in Germany.
- Armenians: approx. 2 million; mostly in Russia but also 800,000 in France, Ukraine, Greece, Bulgaria, Spain, Germany, Poland, the United Kingdom and Belgium.
- Berbers: approx. 2 million live in France but also Italy, the Netherlands, Belgium and Spain.
- Kurds: approx. 2 million; mostly in Germany, France, Sweden, Russia, the Netherlands, Belgium and the United Kingdom.
- Chinese: approx. 1 million; 600,000-700,000 of them live in France, 433,000 live in the United Kingdom, Russia, Italy, Spain, Germany and the Netherlands.
- Vietnamese: approx. 800,000; mostly in France, Germany, the United Kingdom, Poland, Norway, the Netherlands, Finland, Sweden, Denmark and Russia.
- Filipinos: approx. 600,000; mostly in the United Kingdom, France, Italy, Spain, Germany, the Netherlands, Sweden, Austria and Ireland.
- Iranians: approx. 250,000; mostly in Germany, Sweden, the United Kingdom, Russia, the Netherlands, France, Austria, Norway, Spain and Denmark.
- Somalis: approx. 200,000; mostly in the United Kingdom, Sweden, the Netherlands, Norway, Germany, Finland, Denmark and Italy.
- Assyrians: approx. 200,000; mostly in Sweden, Germany, Russia, France and The Netherlands.
- Japanese: approx. 100,000; mostly in the United Kingdom, France and Germany.

=== Foreign-born people and their descendants ===
According to Eurostat 59.9 million people lived in the European Union in 2023 who were born outside their resident country. This corresponds to 13.35% of the total EU population. Of these, 31.4 million (9.44%) were born outside the EU and 17.5 million (3.91%) were born in another EU member state.

Country	Total population (1000)	Total Foreign-born (1000)	%	Born in other EU state (1000)	%	Born in a non EU state (1000)	%
EU 27	448,754	59,902	13.3	17,538	3.9	31,368	6.3
Germany	84,359	16,476	19.5	6,274	7.4	10,202	12.1
France	68,173	11,985	17.2	2,204	3.4	9,781	16.2
Spain	48,085	8,204	17.1	1,580	3.3	6,624	13.8
Italy	58,997	6,417	10.9	1,563	2.6	4,854	8.2
Netherlands	17,811	2,777	15.6	748	4.2	2,029	11.4
Greece	10,414	1,173	11.3	235	2.2	938	9.0
Sweden	10,522	2,144	20.4	548	5.2	1,596	15.2
Austria	9,105	1,963	21.6	863	9.5	1,100	12.1
Belgium	11,743	2,247	19.1	938	8.0	1,309	11.1
Portugal	10,467	1,684	16.1	378	3.6	1,306	12.5
Denmark	5,933	804	13.6	263	4.4	541	9.1
Finland	5,564	461	8.3	131	2.4	330	5.9
Poland	36,754	933	2.5	231	0.6	702	1.9
Czech Republic	10,828	764	7.1	139	1.3	625	5.8
Hungary	9,600	644	6.7	342	3.6	302	3.1
Romania	19,055	530	2.8	202	1.1	328	1.7
Slovakia	5,429	213	3.9	156	2.9	57	1.0
Bulgaria	6,448	169	2.6	58	0.9	111	1.7
Ireland	5,271	1,150	21.8	348	6.6	802	15.2

== Border crises ==
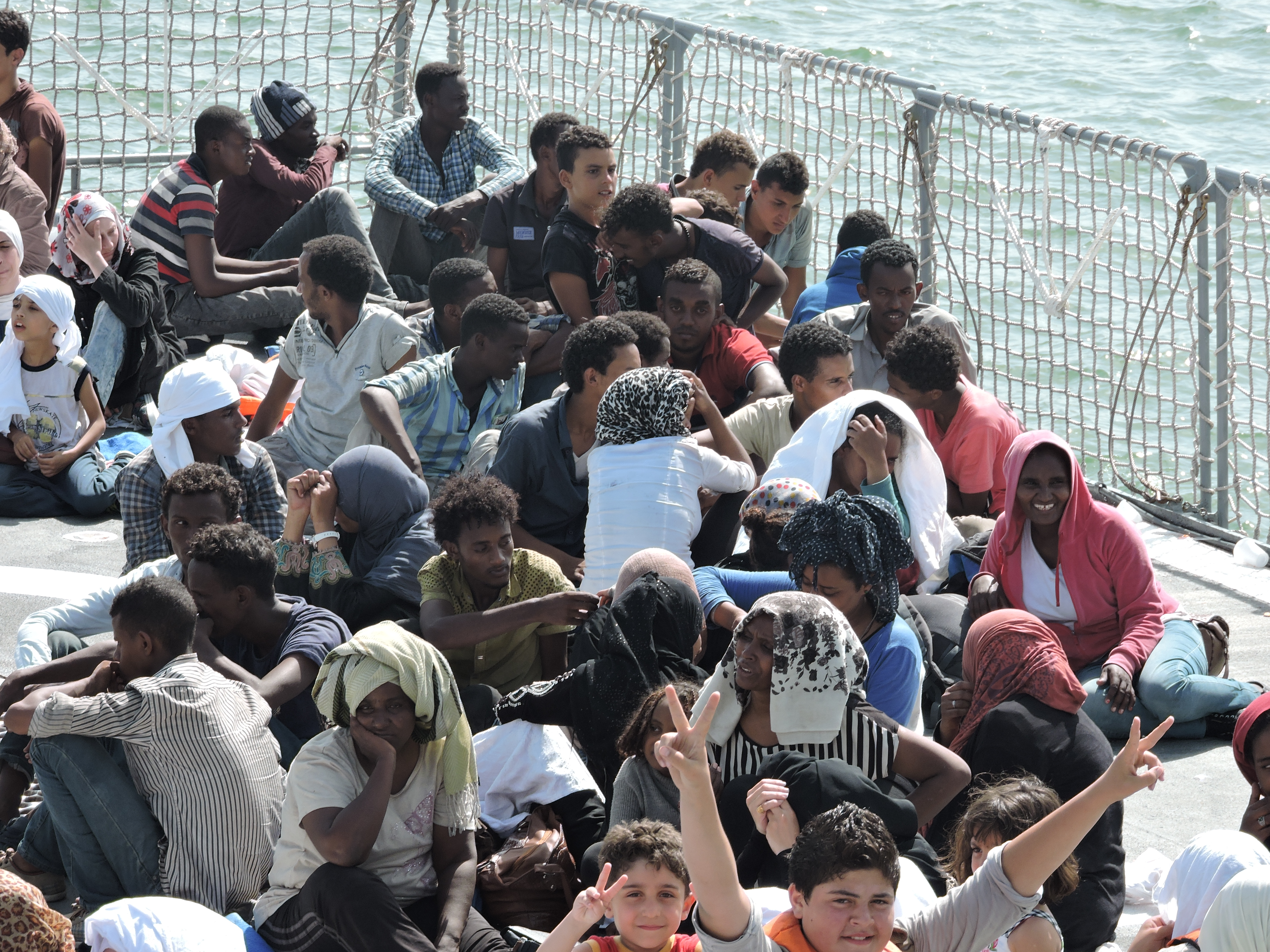
Migrants in the Mediterranean Sea sailing to the Italian port of Catania, 5 September 2015

The EU Border and Coast Guard Agency (Frontex) uses the terms "illegal" and "irregular" border crossings for crossings of an EU external border but not at an official border-crossing point. These include illegal migrants interdicted at sea.

=== 2015 European migrant crisis Hungarian border barrier ===
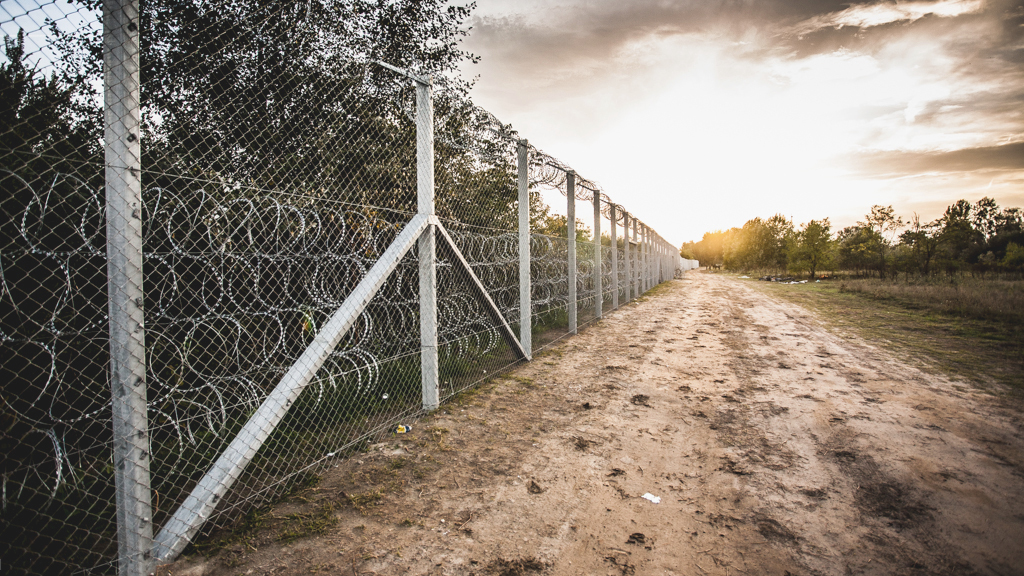
Hungarian border barrier

In 2015, Hungary erected a border barrier on its border with Serbia and Croatia. The fence was constructed by prison labour during the European migrant crisis, with the aim of preventing illegal entry by migrants from entering. Attempted border entries fell following the barrier's construction. During the month of September 2015 there was a total number of 138,396 migrant entries, and within the first two weeks of November the average daily number of intercepted migrants decreased to only 15, which is a daily reduction of more than 4,500.

Number of migrants reported as apprehended by police on entering Hungary 2015-2017

Number of illegal migrants entering Hungary since 2015, monthly breakdown
Month	Number of migrants
2015-01	14,647
2015-02	17,384
2015-03	5,975
2015-04	8,224
2015-05	11,606
2015-06	19,546
2015-07	38,059
2015-08	57,938
2015-09	138,396
2015-10	99,497
2015-11	315
2015-12	270
2016-01	553
2016-02	2,398
2016-03	3,412
2016-04	3,946
2016-05	3,463
2016-06	3,768
2016-07	573
2016-08	348
2016-09	152

Source: Police.hu - Border information(original URL)

=== Mediterranean Sea trafficking ===
Since 2013, over 700,000 undocumented migrants have arrived in Italy via the Mediterranean Sea, mostly from sub-Saharan Africa. In September 2023, boats carrying approximately 7,000 migrants arrived on the Italian island of Lampedusa within 24 hours In 2023, 155,754 migrants arrived in Italy illegally, compared to 103,846 in 2022.

A record number of 46,843 migrants, mostly from Senegal, Mali and Morocco, arrived illegally in Spain's Canary Islands in 2024, up from 39,910 in 2023.

Frontex tracks and publishes data on numbers of crossings along the main six routes twice a year. The following table summarises the number of "irregular crossings" of the European Union's various external borders. Note that the figures do not add up to the total number of people coming into the EU illegally in a given year, since many immigrants are counted twice (for instance, once when entering Greece and a second time upon entering Hungary).

Main immigration routes to the European Union	Illegal border crossings											
Main immigration routes to the European Union	2006	2007	2008	2009	2010	2011	2012	2013	2014	2015	2016	2017
Canary Islands	31,600	12,500	9,200	2,250	200	340	170	250	275	874	671	421
Spain (minus Canary Islands)	—N/a	—N/a	6,500	6,650	5,000	8,450	6,400	6,800	7,840	7,164	10,231	23,063
Greece and Malta sea borders	—N/a	—N/a	39,800	11,000	4,500	64,300	15,900	40,000	170,760	153,946	181,459	118,962
Apulia and Calabria	—N/a	—N/a	—N/a	807	2,788	5,259	4,772	5,000	170,760	153,946	181,459	118,962
Greece's land borders with Albania and North Macedonia	—N/a	—N/a	42,000	40,000	35,300	5,300	5,500	8,700	8,840	8,932	5,121	6,396
Western Balkan route (Note: Greece's, Bulgaria's, Romania's, Hungary's and Croatia's borders with the Western Balkans)	—N/a	—N/a	—N/a	3,090	2,370	4,650	6,390	19,950	43,360	764,038	130,261	12,179
Eastern Mediterranean route (Note: Cyprus' and Greece's sea borders, Greece's and Bulgaria's land borders with Turkey)	—N/a	—N/a	52,300	40,000	55,700	57,000	37,200	24,800	50,830	885,386	182,277	42,319
Eastern Borders route (Note: Romania's, Hungary's, Slovakia's, Poland's, Lithuania's, Latvia's, Estonia's, Finland's and Norway's land borders with Moldova, Ukraine, Belarus and Russia)	—N/a	—N/a	1,335	1,050	1,050	1,050	1,600	1,300	1,270	1,920	1,349	776
Totals	—N/a	—N/a	—N/a	104,847	106,908	146,349	77,932	106,800	283,175	1,822,260	500,248	204,654
Source: Frontex

In February 2026, the Italian cabinet under Prime Minister Giorgia Meloni announced new powers to institute naval blockades to secure the border against ships of illegal migrants.

=== Belarusian migrant smuggling ===
In August 2021, the government of Belarus began sponsoring an influx of migrants, mostly from the Middle East and North Africa, to the borders of Lithuania, Poland and Latvia. Although Belarus denied involvement, both the European Union and independent observers viewed it as hybrid warfare undertaken in response to the deterioration in Belarus–European Union relations following the 2020 Belarusian presidential election and the 2020–2021 Belarusian protests. Between August and December 2021, tens of thousands of unauthorized border crossing attempts were recorded, peaking in October. Poland, Lithuania, and Latvia each declared states of emergency and announced their intentions to build border walls. The EU sent supporting officers and patrol cars to Lithuania, and 12 EU governments stated their support for a physical barrier along the border. After the EU refused to finance protective structures on the external borders, Poland and Lithuania completed their barriers on the border with Belarus on their own. In 2024, there was a 192 percent increase in illegal crossings from Belarus into the EU. In May 2025, Lithuania filed a case against Belarus at the International Court of Justice for "orchestrating a migrant crisis that endangered lives and violated international law". In 2025, four concrete-reinforced tunnels to smuggle migrants to the European Union were found on the Belarusian-Polish border in Podlaskie Voivodeship, representing a new front in Belarusian hybrid warfare tactics.

=== Ukrainian conscription evasion ===
Following the February 2022 Russian invasion of Ukraine and the subsequent travel restrictions imposed on men aged 18 to 60 under the 2022 Ukrainian mobilization, which were later narrowed to ages 23 to 60, tens of thousands of Ukrainian men have evaded conscription by illegally crossing into neighbouring European Union member states, often undertaking hazardous transits through the Carpathian Mountains and across the Tisza River that have resulted in numerous rescues and fatalities. According to Romanian border police, more than 30,000 Ukrainian men have entered the country illegally since the start of the conflict, with Romanian authorities granting them temporary protection status under European Union measures.

In June 2026, European Commission President Ursula von der Leyen signaled plans to alter the terms of the Temporary Protection Directive, an EU emergency mechanism granting immediate collective protection to displaced persons. Consequently, EU member states began debating the exclusion of newly arriving Ukrainian men aged 23 to 60 who were subject to mobilization requirements, with the stated aim of avoiding any undermining of Ukraine's self-defence capacity. This initiative aligns with the stance of German Chancellor Friedrich Merz, who stated during a bilateral meeting with Ukrainian President Volodymyr Zelenskyy that Berlin would actively support Kyiv's efforts to limit the exodus of military-age men and facilitate their return, emphasizing their necessity for Ukraine's defense and future reconstruction.

== Gallup study, 2010 ==
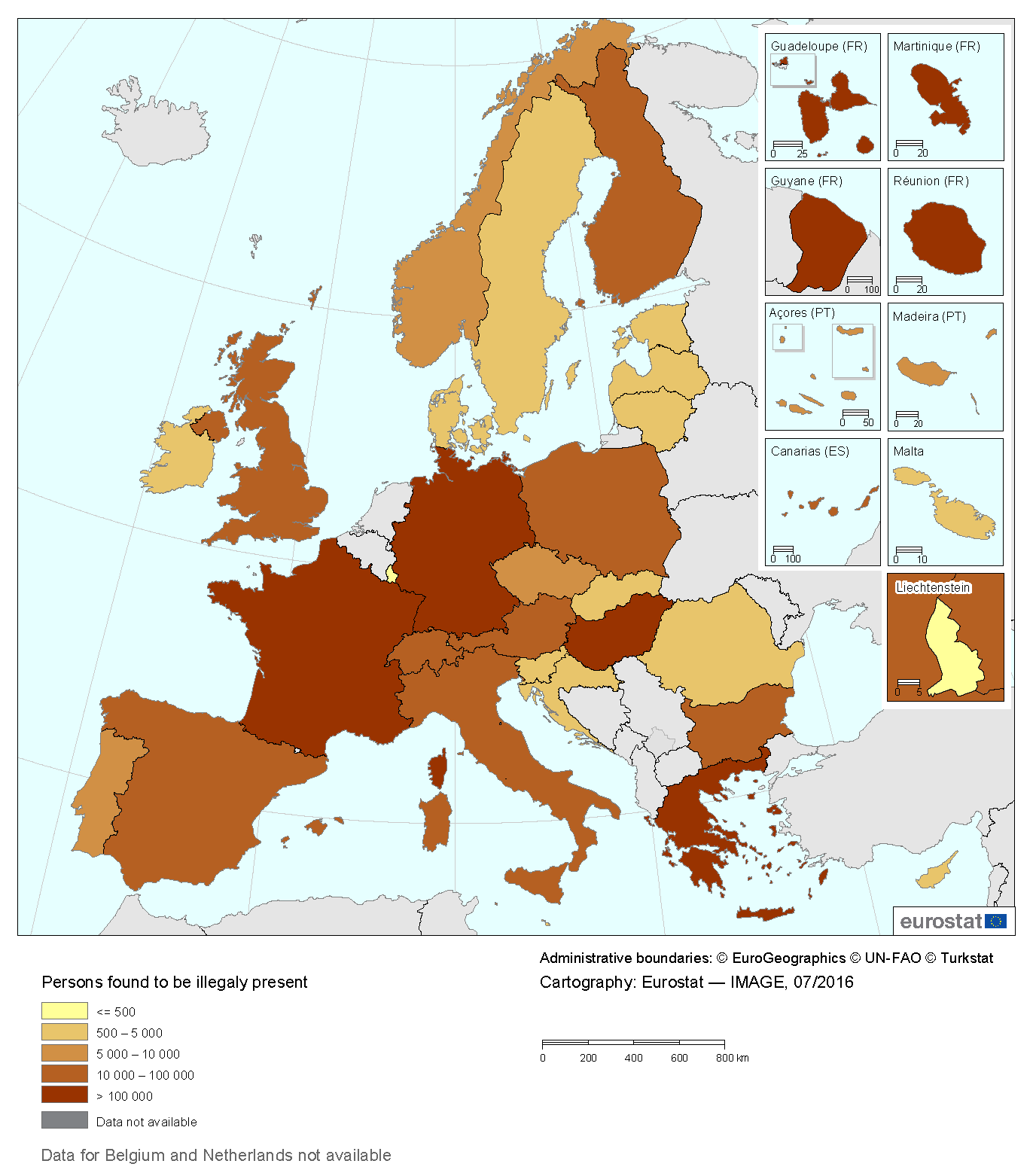
Eurostat: Non-EU citizens found to be illegally present in the EU-28 and EFTA, 2015

Gallup has published a study estimating potential migrants in 2010. The study estimated that 700 million adults worldwide would prefer to migrate to another country. Potential migrants were asked for their country of preference if they were given free choice.

The total number of potential migrants to the European Union is estimated at 200 million, comparable to the number for North America (USA and Canada). In addition, an estimated 40 million potential migrants within the EU desire to move to another country within the EU, giving the EU the highest intra-regional potential migration rate. The study estimates that from 2015 to 2017, there were about 750 million potential migrants. One in five potential migrants (21%), or about 158 million adults worldwide name the U.S. as their desired future residence. Canada, Germany, France, Australia and the United Kingdom each appeal to more than 30 million adults. Apart from the United States, the top desired target countries were: Canada (47 million), Germany (42 million), France (36 million), Australia (36 million) and the United Kingdom (34 million).

== See also ==
- Demographics of Europe
- Emigration from Europe
- International Criminal Court investigation in Libya#European anti-immigration policy
- Immigration to the Western world
- List of sovereign states and dependent territories by immigrant population
- List of sovereign states and dependent territories by fertility rate
- Migration from Latin America to Europe
- Remigration
