= 2021 Aegean Sea boat capsizing =

Maritime incident in the Aegean Sea

Coordinates: 37.175°N 25.027°E

The 2021 Aegean Sea boat capsizing took place on 24 December 2021. 16 people died in the Aegean Sea.

The Greek coast guard said that 63 people were rescued after a sailboat capsized late on a Friday 8 kilometers off the island of Paros in the central Aegean.

== History ==
The history of these events can be traced back long ago to the problem of immigration to Europe and was intensified because of the 2015 European migrant crisis, which may be related to the aftermath of the Wars in Iraq.

The Aegean Sea became a major route for entry to Europe via Greece. Thousands of immigrants on this route have perished.
