= Poverty in Norway =

Poverty in Norway had been declining from World War II until the Great Recession. It is now increasing slowly, and is significantly higher among immigrants from the Middle East and Africa. Before an analysis of poverty can be undertaken, the definition of poverty must first be established, because it is a subjective term. The measurement of poverty in Norway deviates from the measurement used by the OECD. Norway traditionally has been a global model and leader in maintaining low levels on poverty and providing a basic standard of living for even its poorest citizens. Norway combines a free market economy with the welfare model to ensure both high levels of income and wealth creation and equal distribution of this wealth. It has achieved unprecedented levels of economic development, equality and prosperity.

== Definition of poverty ==
The most commonly used measure to define economic poverty in Norway is an income which is less than 60% of the annual median disposable equivalised household income. Under this definition, 9.4% of Norwegian children aged between 0–17 years lived under the poverty line in 2014, which was up from 7.6% in 2006. However, extreme poverty as a measure is not commonly used because it is almost non-existent in Norway. Another important element of defining poverty is the distinction between persistent poverty and temporary poverty because it is common for students and new migrants to go through temporary periods of hardship as they settle into a new phase of their lives. As a result, it is not as much of an issue as persistent poverty and assists policymakers in correctly addressing this issue. Norway has set a much higher standard for poverty than most other nations in the OECD which use 50% of the national median income as their standard measure of relative poverty and as a result, the actual rate of poverty relative to other nations is lower than the data suggests.

== Incidence of poverty in Norway ==
In comparison to the rest of the world, poverty in Norway has remained low. Poverty in Norway is concentrated in the major cities such as Oslo. 43% of all the poor in Norway are immigrants, even though they contribute only 16.3% of Norway's population. The incidence of poverty is higher in populations from the Middle East and Africa. However, extreme poverty in Norway is almost non-existent. 74% of those in Norway aged between 15-64 have a job compared to the OECD average of 67% and this contributes to the low rates of poverty. However, between 2013 and 2017 the rate of poor increased from 7.7% to 9.7%, which is in line with the trend of increasing poverty and inequality in the developed world. This increase may also be attributed to the after-effects of the Great Recession. According to Our World in Data, the annual growth of the income or consumption in the lowest 40% (of the population) is 0.2%. Norway's poorest population is getting richer, but slowly. The growth rate of individuals living in poverty in Norway is similar to the other Nordic countries, such as Finland at 0.3% growth, and Sweden at -0.1% growth. 0.2% of Norway’s population makes less than $3 a day, which is under the international poverty line. Finland and Sweden have similar or identical statistics; 0.2% of Finland's population and 0.8% of Sweden's population lives in extreme poverty. All three countries have relatively low levels of extreme poverty. However, the growth rate for those who are living in extreme poverty (underneath the international poverty line), is not increasing at an optimal rate.

Norway's economy is heavily dependent on oil trade and many welfare programs are dependent on oil exports, therefore a fall in oil prices and exports tends to increase poverty and increase in prices and exports has the opposite effect. Although the incidence of poverty is low, it is increasing at a faster rate than most other OECD nations and this is also reflected in the increase of income and wealth inequality in Norway. This increase in poverty is likely to result increase in drug abuse, homelessness and higher crime which further restricts economic mobility. The growth in income inequality appears to be associated with the growth of poverty. The Gini index which is the most commonly used measure of inequality in Norway has increased from 26.4 in 2006 to 27.5 in 2017 indicating a gradual increase in inequality.

== Causes of poverty and economic culture ==
The largest determinants of poverty in Norway were education level, employment and whether they are a single individual or have a spouse. The demographic at the highest risk of poverty in Norway is children aged under 18. However, Norway has been largely successful in keeping rates of poverty low and extreme poverty, extremely low. This is largely a reflection of the economic and social culture that exists in Norway. Norway is a largely homogenous society which places a heavy emphasis on collectivism and egalitarianism, distinguishing one's self from the crowd by socio-economic status is frowned upon. The percentage of Norwegians support public aid for the poor is also higher than in many other countries. This is particularly true of women, younger people and those living in urban areas. The homogeneity of Norway's demographic is also associated with less poverty, as western countries with higher rates of migration such as the United States see higher rates of poverty, especially among new migrants. This may be due to the fact that the causes of poverty in a homogenous population are much more narrow and hence easier to manage, whereas diversity in a population increases the complexity of poverty and may make it more difficult to manage. Migrants in Norway are generally less educated and speak poorer Norwegian than the average Norwegian which contributes to higher unemployment and poverty. Also, many immigrant families rely on a single income which further increases the likelihood of financial distress and poverty. The strong labour traditions in Norway, including strong unions and extensive collective bargaining also contribute to low rates of poverty among working Norwegians. The wealthiest 10% of Norwegians control 21.2% of Norway's wealth, which is a significantly smaller proportion of controlled by the top 10% than in most other countries.

Norway also has a stable, free and democratic political system which contributes to effective institutions because of low levels of corruption and high institutional integrity which means that public institutions can effectively perform their respective roles' without hindrance.

There are two distinct ways in which the causes of poverty can be characterised, personal and economic. Personal includes issues such as mental illness, social isolation and language that restrict individuals' ability to engage and interact with society and hence leading to higher rates of joblessness and poverty. Structural issues include such as unemployment, lack of government support, low access to a quality affordable healthcare system and education.

Welfare policy administration is unique in Norway compared to other European countries. Spain, for example, administers social security in a way that provides funding for the traditional family structure to boost family involvement in welfare of individuals whereas Norway simply aims to provide benefits directly to the individual who needs it. The Norwegian model has also been more effective at alleviating poverty.

== Poverty alleviation measures ==
Economic activity in Norway is taxed highly when compared to OECD nations. The average tax to GDP ratio of OECD nations in 2018 was 34% while in Norway it was 38.1%. The top marginal income tax rate is 46.6% which includes tax on income, social security contributions and national insurance contributions is in line with the OECD average. However, the top VAT/GST in Norway is higher than OECD average at 25% to 19.3% and corporate tax rate is 23% compared to the OECD mean of 21.9%. This high tax revenue is the base for the government programs that are the primary reasons for low rates of poverty in Norway. Norway's federal government's strong revenue collection enables very high spending on unemployment benefits, public housing, universal healthcare and public education. This creates a floor to socioeconomic standards which enables most Norwegians to maintain a reasonable standard of living. Although an increasing share of government expenditure is funding welfare benefits which reduce the government's ability to spend on healthcare, education and infrastructure. The investments in healthcare not only enable people to people to be in good health, but also partake in economic endeavors without the concern about how they would pay for their healthcare and this further drives economic growth and innovation. Inequities in healthcare have been a priority for the Norwegian government since the 2005 poverty whitepaper which identified health as a key area needing focus in terms of inequality. However, a comprehensive welfare program must be supported by an economy with a high participation rate, low unemployment and high productivity because such welfare state policies are expensive to run. Such policies must not only exist, but be organised efficiently and effectively to be able to cover as many people as possible at a low cost. It also requires nations to not have high levels of national debt which can make social security payments difficult during times of recession.

Another key social program run by the Norwegian central government is the “Qualification Program”, which helps individuals who have traditionally not been part of the labour market to enter the labour force, find a job and lift themselves out of poverty. This program primarily targets those between the ages of 20–24, single parents, long term social payment recipients, immigrants with poor Norwegian language skills and those on drug treatment programs. These groups are considered at highest risk of long term poverty. The Norwegian government considers this the most important poverty reduction program and through this program it is targeting 100% of its working age population being in paid work over the next several years.

Unemployment protection in Norway is mandatory and those with a history of employed earn 63% of their basic wage in unemployment benefits. In absolute terms unemployment benefits in Norway have increased over the past two decades, however the requirements to be eligible for these benefits have tightened to prevent misuse of the system.

An inclusive working life agreement exists in Norway between employers and trade unions to achieve a high participation rate through a work life balance through consensus. Strong collective bargaining rights have contributed to high wages and benefits for employees and mean that the proportion of full-time working people who live in poverty is amongst the lowest in the world.

Norway's economic model has targeted balancing economic growth, stability, increasing the participation rate and further expansion of the welfare model. Not only has the Norwegian government focused on developing policies to reduce poverty, but on ensuring these policies are carried out effectively and reach out to as many people as possible. Globally variations can be seen with how poverty is targeted, cultures which place emphasis on the family tend to provide families with financial aid to assist them in helping struggling family members, whereas others provide aid directly to the individuals who need help.

Bergen in South Western Norway is attempting to reduce poverty by providing free internet access for kids. This program is designed to increase children's access to information and educational resources, particularly for the most needy and hence close the educational gap between the higher and lower income children. 97% of Norwegians already have access to the internet and this program aims to bring it to 100%. The Norwegian central government also works closely with municipal governments through grants and programs in order to help reduce poverty. Many programs are designed to increase social inclusion and cohesion which can combat isolation and social exclusion driven poverty.
