= Arne Aasheim =

Norwegian civil servant and diplomat (1945–2025)

Norwegian ambassador to Mexico
- In office 2009–2013

Norwegian ambassador to Morocco
- In office 2003–2008

Norwegian ambassador to Guatemala
- In office 1997–2000

Personal details
- Born: October 25, 1945 (age 80)

Arne Aasheim (25 October 1945 - 21 April 2025) was a Norwegian diplomat and ambassador.

He held a cand.mag. degree and worked in the Norwegian foreign service fra 1976 to 2013. Aasheim served as Norway's ambassador to Guatemala from 1997 to 2000, to Morocco from 2003 to 2008 and to Mexico from 2009 to 2013. He also served as a special adviser in the Ministry of Foreign Affairs in Oslo.
