= Morocco–Norway relations =

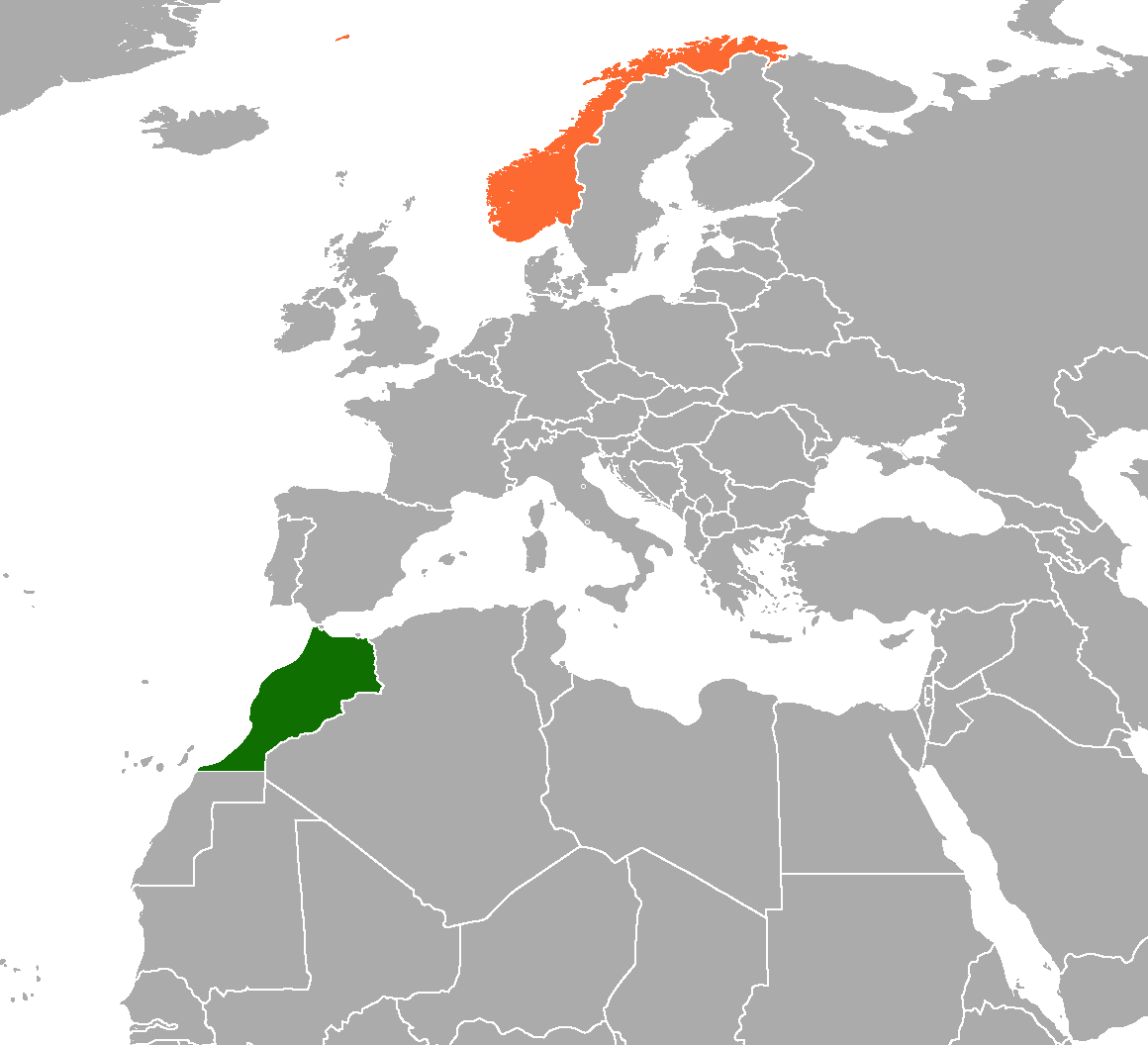
- Morocco: Norway

Morocco–Norway relations refer to bilateral relations between Morocco and Norway. Morocco has an embassy in Oslo whilst Norway has an embassy in Rabat.

== 1970s ==
In what has been called the Lillehammer affair, Moroccan citizen Ahmed Bouchikhi was assassinated in Lillehammer in 1973 by Mossad, who mistook Bouchikhi for Ali Hassan Salameh. Norway reacted with judicial prosecution of Mossad operatives.

== 2000s ==
The Norwegian embassy's alleged improper sheltering of two dual-citizenship children (of Khalid Skah and Cecilie Hopstock) during their escape in 2009, led to a diplomatic dispute between the two countries. The children stayed at the embassy for three days. On the following day, Norway's ambassador Bjørn Blokhus left Morocco. One year after the incident, Moroccan authorities had not approved any new ambassador from Norway.

== See also ==
- Foreign relations of Morocco
- Foreign relations of Norway
- Moroccans in Norway
