= Eritreans in Norway =

Eritrean diaspora in Norway

Total population
- 27,855 (2020 Official Norway estimate) 0.52% of the Norwegian population

Regions with significant populations
- Oslo

Languages
- Tigrinya · Tigre · Kunama · Nara · Afar, · Beja · Saho · Bilen · Arabic · English · Norwegian

Religion
- Eritrean Orthodox, Islam

Eritreans in Norway are citizens and residents of Norway who are of Eritrean descent. Most have a background as asylum seekers who fled Isaias Afwerki's regime.

== Demographics ==
According to Statistics Norway, in 2017, there are a total 19,957 persons of Eritrean origin living in Norway. Of those, 3,661 individuals were born in Norway to immigrant parents. In 2020 the number had risen to 27,855 people, making Eritreans the second biggest migration group from Africa after Somalis.

== Socioeconomics ==
According to Statistics Norway, as of 2014, around 59% of Eritrea-born immigrants have a persistently low income. This was a higher proportion than the native population and many other immigrant groups, largely because most Eritrean individuals arrived as asylum immigrants, who tend to have lower incomes. Persons born in Norway to Eritrean immigrants have a significantly smaller low income percentage of approximately 28%.

== Crime ==
According to Statistics Norway, in the 2010-2013 period, the proportion of Eritrea-born perpetrators of criminal offences aged 15 and older in Norway was 79.94 per 1000 residents. When corrected for variables such as age and gender as well as employment, the total decreased to 67.09 after age and gender adjustment and to 52.75 after employment adjustment. This is higher compared to the averages of 44.9 among native Norwegians. As of 2015, a total of 547 Eritrea citizens residing in Norway incurred sanctions. The principal breaches were traffic offences (330 individuals), followed by other offences for profit (60 individuals), public order and integrity violations (51 individuals), violence and maltreatment (39 individuals), drug and alcohol offences (35 individuals), property theft (22 individuals), sexual offences (8 individuals), criminal damage (2 individuals), and other offences (0 individuals).

== Education ==
According to Statistics Norway, as of 2016, among a total 17,022 Eritrea-born immigrants aged 16 and older, 12,302 individuals had attained a below upper secondary education level, 2,429 had attained an upper secondary education level, 193 had attained a tertiary vocational education level, 1,392 had attained a higher education level of up to four years in duration, 299 had attained a higher education level of more than four years in duration, and 407 had no education.

== Employment ==
According to Statistics Norway, as of 2016, Eritrea-born immigrants aged 15–74 in Norway have an employment rate of approximately 37.9%. As of 2017, their unemployment rate was also about 4.5%.

== See also ==
- African immigration to Norway
