= Moroccans in Norway =

Total population
- 10,500 (2019 Official Norway estimate) 0.2% of the Norwegian population

Regions with significant populations
- Oslo

Languages
- Arabic (Moroccan Arabic), Berber, Norwegian

Religion
- predominantly Islam, minority Christianity

Related ethnic groups
- Moroccan diaspora

Moroccans in Norway are citizens and residents of Norway who are of Moroccan descent. It is one of the smaller immigrant groups in Norway.

== Demographics ==
According to Statistics Norway, as of 2017, there are a total 5,796 persons of Moroccan origin living in Norway. Of those, 4,159 individuals were born in Norway to immigrant parents.

== Socioeconomics ==
According to Statistics Norway, as of 2012-2014, the percentage of Morocco-born immigrants in Norway with a persistently low income averaged out at 32.4%. This proportion has also steadily declined the longer that the individuals have resided in Norway, with percentages of 50% among 3 year Morocco-born residents, 33.4% among 4-9 year residents, and 31.5% among residents of 10 years or longer. This was relative to immigrant averages of 26.3% overall, 50.3% among 3 year residents, 28.5% among 4-9 year residents, and 20.2% among residents of 10 years or more. As of 2014, around 38% of Morocco-born immigrants have a persistently low income, with individuals born in Norway to Moroccan immigrants having a smaller low income percentage of approximately 22%.

== Crime ==
According to Statistics Norway, in the 2010-2013 period, the proportion of Morocco-born perpetrators of criminal offences aged 15 and older in Norway was 94.20 per 1000 residents. This was compared to averages of 44.9 among native Norwegians and 112.9 among Norway-born residents with parents of foreign origin. When corrected for variables such as age and gender (M2) as well as employment (M4), the unadjusted Moroccan average (M1) for 2010-2013 decreased to 86.18 after age and gender adjustment and to 78.59 after employment adjustment. As of 2015, a total of 155 Morocco citizens residing in Norway incurred sanctions. The principal breaches were drug and alcohol offences (54 individuals), followed by property theft (37 individuals), public order and integrity violations (27 individuals), traffic offences (15 individuals), violence and maltreatment (15 individuals), other offences for profit (6 individuals), sexual offences (1 individual), criminal damage (0 individuals), and other offences (0 individuals).

== Education ==
According to Statistics Norway, as of 2016, among a total 5,586 Morocco-born immigrants aged 16 and older, 2,544 individuals had attained a below upper secondary education level, 1,391 had attained an upper secondary education level, 69 had attained a tertiary vocational education level, 937 had attained a higher education level of up to four years in duration, 224 had attained a higher education level of more than four years in duration, and 421 had no education.

== Employment ==
According to Statistics Norway, as of 2016, Morocco-born immigrants aged 15–74 in Norway have an employment rate of approximately 46.8%. As of 2017, their unemployment rate was also about 4.9%.

== See also ==
- Demographics of Morocco
- African immigration to Norway
- Moroccans in Denmark
- Moroccans in Finland
- Moroccans in Sweden
