= African immigration to Norway =

African Norwegians
Total population
- 165,980 (2025); ~3.0% of the Norwegian population

Regions with significant populations
- Oslo

Languages
- Norwegian, Afroasiatic languages, Niger–Congo languages, Nilo-Saharan languages

Religion
- Christianity, Islam, Judaism, Traditional African religions

African immigration to Norway (Norwegian: Afrikaner) refers to immigrants to Norway from Africa. An estimated 150,000 people in Norway are either first or second generation immigrants from Africa. Most of these have a background as asylum seekers.

== Distribution ==
=== Horn of Africa ===
Immigration from countries from the Horn of Africa to Norway grew slightly from the end of the 1980s, but grew markedly from 2000 onwards. The growth is usually attributed mainly to a rise in the number of refugees from Somalia (43,273), Eritrea (27,855) and Ethiopia (11,505). Around 30% of all Africans in Norway are of Somali descent, around 20% are Eritreans, and the other 50% (65,850) are from the rest of Africa.

=== Other Africans ===
Compared with immigrants from Somalia and Eritrea, the percentage of Africans from other regions of Africa is low. Most other Africans in Norway come from West Africa, especially Ghana (2,034), Gambia (1,409) and Nigeria (1,247). There is also a sizeable population of Africans from the Democratic Republic of the Congo (2,050), and there is also a Moroccan community in Norway.

== Crime ==
According to Statistics Norway, in the 2010–2013 period, the proportion of African-born perpetrators of criminal offences aged 15 and older in Norway was 107.1 per 1000 residents. When corrected for variables such as age and gender as well as employment, the total decreased to 90.06. This is higher compared to the averages of 44.9 among native Norwegians. Somali-born perpetrators of criminal offences were 123.8 and 102.3 after age and gender adjustment. For Eritrean-born perpetrators of criminal offences they were 79.9 and 67.1 after age and gender adjustment. Immigrants from Africa had a higher crime rate compared to migrants from other parts of the world. Asian-born perpetrators of criminal offences were 75.5 and 66.9 after age and gender adjustment, and for Eastern European-born the numbers were 73.2 and 59.0 after age and gender adjustment.

== Demographics ==
=== Country of origin ===
Most African Norwegians have a background from the following countries:

Country	Population						Increase (2010–2014)
Country	(1970)	(1980)	(1990)	(2000)	(2010)	(2014)	Increase (2010–2014)
Total	1,179	3,188	10,069	26,521	67,168	97,152	44.64%
Somalia	3	26	1,303	8,386	25,496	35,912	40.85%
Eritrea	0	3	18	733	5,789	14,397	148.70%
Morocco	401	1,130	2,380	5,409	8,058	9,111	13.07%
Ethiopia	8	214	1,398	2,525	5,156	7,807	51.42%
Sudan	6	25	57	371	1,318	3,092	134.60%
DR Congo	12	12	83	236	2,050	2,590	26.34%
Ghana	8	29	730	1,341	2,034	2,424	19.17%
Nigeria	11	108	284	504	1,247	1,964	57.50%
Algeria	64	130	435	880	1,497	1,637	9.35%
Kenya	16	114	303	642	1,275	1,636	28.31%
Gambia	19	143	568	984	1,409	1,606	13.98%
Burundi	0	0	3	62	1,119	1,350	20.64%
Tunisia	39	100	358	607	1,106	1,279	15.64%
Liberia	3	8	23	26	1,075	1,220	13.49%
Uganda	11	176	246	473	903	1,167	29.24%
Egypt	83	170	281	399	806	1,118	38.71%

=== Regional distribution ===
Norwegians with African background live in the following electoral districts:

Numbers of African Norwegians (2019)
Electoral district	Number	Percent of electoral district
Oslo	40,438	5.94%
Akershus	13,431	2.15%
Hordaland	10,376	1.98%
Rogaland	9,660	2.03%
Østfold	6,614	2.22%
Buskerud	6,149	2.17%
Sør-Trøndelag	3,781*	1.23%*
Nordland	4,508	1.85%
Telemark	4,156	2.40%
Vestfold	3,990	1.59%
Troms	3,422	2.04%
Hedmark	3,490	1.77%
Oppland	3,646	1.92%
Vest-Agder	3,990	2.13%
Møre og Romsdal	4,108	1.55%
Nord-Trøndelag	1,855*	1.37%*
Sogn og Fjordane	1,829	1.67%
Aust-Agder	1,939	1.65%
Finnmark	1,202	1.58%

The " * " symbol denotes figures from 2010

== See also ==
- African immigration to Europe
- Eritreans in Norway
- Ethiopians in Norway
- Moroccans in Norway
- Somalis in Norway
