= Somalis in Norway =

Total population
- 43,273 (2020 Official Norway estimate) 0.80% of the Norwegian population

Regions with significant populations
- Oslo

Languages
- Somali, Norwegian

Religion
- Islam

Somalis in Norway are citizens and residents of Norway who are of Somali descent. They are the biggest African migration group in Norway. 36.5% of Somalis in Norway live in the capital Oslo. Almost all Somali in Norway have come to Norway as refugees from the Somali Civil War. In 2016, Somalis were the largest non-European migrant group in Norway.

== Demographics ==
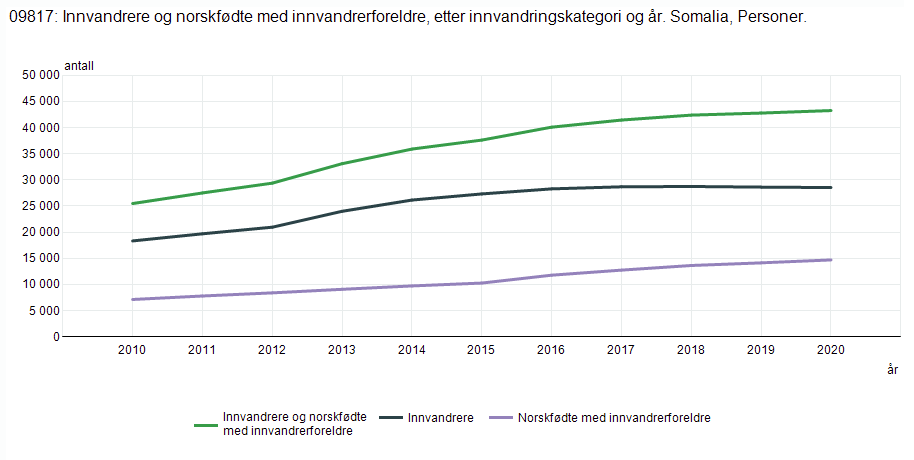
Number of people with Somali origin in Norway. Black: Born in Somalia Purple: Born in Norway with Somali parents Green: Sum Source: Statistics Norway

According to Statistics Norway, as of 2020, there were 28,554 immigrants from Somalia living in Norway and 14,719 people who were born in Norway to two Somali-born parents. The number of Somalis in Norway has more than doubled since the mid-2000s. According to social researcher Anders Næss, "This rapid population growth is attributable to high birth rates, family reunification, and a continuing stream of asylum seekers, and creates a highly diverse population in terms of residency duration, migration experiences, education, and acquired familiarity with a Norwegian cultural and institutional context".

According to the Oslo Municipality, as of 2014, a total of 8,758 Somalia-born immigrants reside in Oslo. Of those individuals, many arrived during the 2000-2004 period (2,811 persons).

In 2004, Somali women had the highest nativity rate in Norway with 4.4 children per female, in contrast to 1.73 for Norwegian women.

== History ==
The first Somalis in Norway were sailors and arrived in the country during the 1970s. After a failed coup in Somalia in 1978 the first refugees came to Norway which were followed by more during the 1980s. During this period most Somalis who came to Norway belonged to the Issaq-clan. After the Somali Civil War broke out in 1991 the number of asylum seekers increased. During the 1990s and up to about 2001, most asylum seekers said they belonged to the Hawiye clan which resides in the southern part of Somalia.

== Attachments to home country ==
Sociologist Katrine Fangen conducted interviews with 50 Somalis living in Norway. According to her interviews, both men and women were positive towards gender equality in terms of both men and women working outside the home. There was a significant difference for sexuality, where boys had much greater sexual freedom than girls and they could engage in behaviour that would be strongly sanctioned in a female. It was also shown that Norwegian-born women of Somali heritage felt they had greater freedom than they would have had in Somalia.

The honor of a woman is a very important subject for most of the interviewees and young women are preoccupied with protecting their reputation against accusations of dishonor. The widespread use of both the hijab and less revealing types of Islamic veil arise from the need to conform to Muslim norms of how a young woman should behave. Wearing the hijab also causes older Somalis to respect them more. Other reasons to wear the Islamic veils are religiosity and protesting against Western culture.

In a 2018 National Police Directorate report, it was found that some Somali parents who lost custody of their children had sent them to Quranic schools in Somalia. As a response, Norwegian authorities suggested cancelling the passports of children who risked being sent to Quranic schools as a way to stop them being taken abroad by their relatives against their will.

== Socioeconomics ==
According to Statistics Norway, as of 2012–2014, the percentage of Somalia-born immigrants in Norway with a persistently low income averaged out at 70.7%. This was a higher proportion than the native population and other immigrant groups, largely because most Somali individuals arrived as asylum immigrants, who tend to have lower incomes. The percentage of Somalia-born immigrants with a persistently low income declined the longer the individuals resided in Norway. As of 2014, around 72% of Somalia-born immigrants have a persistently low income, with individuals born in Norway to Somali immigrants having a smaller low income percentage of approximately 65%.

But in contrast the Somalis are the immigrant groups in Norway that send the most remittance money to their home country. In the first half of the year 2023 alone, Somalis sent 177 million US dollars to Somalia. In comparison Afghan immigrants sent 136 million US dollars in the same period.

In 2011, the Norwegian Labour and Welfare Administration highlighted 100 Somali women who had divorced their husbands and claimed extra income support as the sole provider for the family, then had more children by their former husbands. Each of the families involved had obtained an average of 80 thousand euros from state agencies as a result of doing this.

== Crime ==
According to Statistics Norway, in the 2010–2013 period, the proportion of Somali-born perpetrators of criminal offences aged 15 and older in Norway was 123.8 per 1000 residents. When corrected for age and gender, the total decreased to 102.3. When further adjusted for place of residence and employment, the estimate decreased to 89.0. This is higher compared to the averages of 44.9 among native Norwegians. Somali-born perpetrators of criminal offences were higher than other African immigrants. For Eritrean-born perpetrators of criminal offences it was 79.9 and 67.1 after age and gender adjustment. For Moroccan-born perpetrators of criminal offences it was 94,2 and 86,2 after age and gender adjustment.

== Education ==
Many refugees who arrived early from Somalia were in the process of getting an education which was disrupted when they fled. Those who lived in Somalia during and after the civil war, when schools were not operating, have not completed any education.

According to Statistics Norway, as of 2016, among a total 24,651 Somalia-born immigrants aged 16 and older, 15,944 individuals had attained a below upper secondary education level, 3,709 had attained an upper secondary education level, 122 had attained a tertiary vocational education level, 1,793 had attained a higher education level of up to four years in duration, 378 had attained a higher education level of more than four years in duration, and 2,705 had no education.

Somali youth are often sent to schools abroad by their families, according to a 2019 Fafo Foundation report. According to state secretary of Ministry of Education and Research this can endanger the children's chances of becoming integrated into Norwegian society when they return. In the 2010s public broadcaster NRK published items on Somali-Norwegian youth who had been locked up and chained in Quranic schools in Somalia but, according to their parents, they are sent to Quranic schools to be culturally rehabilitated or to improve discipline.

== Employment ==
Somalis in Norway have low rates of employment. This is partly explained by the relatively recent arrival of many Somalis and also a lack of formal qualifications, when in Norway there are relatively limited employment opportunities for unskilled labour.

According to Statistics Norway, as of 2016, Somalia-born immigrants aged 15–74 in Norway have an employment rate of approximately 32.4%. As of 2017, their unemployment rate was also about 7.5%.

Statistics Norway has been criticized for misrepresenting employment levels for African migrants by counting anything upwards of an hour a week of work as employment. Counting full-time employment as 30 hours of work per week, 11% of women from Somalia were in full-time employment, with another 10% having 1–19 hours of work.

== Family reunification and citizenship issues ==
In 1999, the Norwegian Directorate of Immigration (Norwegian: Udlendingsdirektoratet, UDI) started to use blood testing on Somalis who applied for family reunification; the process was later changed to use DNA tests to verify family ties; these new tests suggested that as many as a quarter of the applicants were not telling the truth. The leader of a Somali community organization in Norway and the Norwegian Medical Association protested against the tests and wanted them to be discontinued. In 2010, UDI introduced DNA tests on Somali childless couples who applied for family reunification where one spouse already resided in Norway. The results showed that 40% of such pairs were actually siblings, not married couples. When news of these results became known, the ratio dropped to 25% and the tests were widened to migrants from other regions.

In 2015, investigations by authorities showed that some Somalis who had claimed to be refugees from the civil wars in Somalia, although ethnic Somalis, were residents of countries neighbouring Somalia. Several of those along with their offspring lost their Norwegian citizenships. In the same year, Norwegian authorities started a program to repatriate Somalis with no right to reside in Norway to Somalia, primarily individuals from Mogadishu.

== See also ==
- Grønland, Oslo
- African immigration to Norway
- Immigration to Norway
