= 1942 in Norway =

- Centuries: 18th; 19th; 20th; 21st
- Decades: 1920s; 1930s; 1940s; 1950s; 1960s
- See also: List of years in Norway

Events in the year 1942 in Norway.

== Incumbents ==
- Government in Exile (in London)
  - Monarch – Haakon VII.
  - Prime Minister – Johan Nygaardsvold (Labour Party)
- German Military Governor
  - Reichskommissar in Norway – Josef Terboven
- German Puppet Government in Oslo
  - Minister-President – Vidkun Quisling (National Unification) – inducted on 1 February

== Events ==
- 1 February – Vidkun Quisling is appointed as the Minister-President of Norway by the German occupiers despite strong opposition.
- 12 February – Vidkun Quisling meets Adolf Hitler.
- 13 March – Vidkun Quisling restored the so-called "Jewish paragraph" of the Norwegian Constitution which forbade Jews to enter or settle in Norway (This paragraph was originally abolished on July 21, 1851). This paragraph was in force until 1945. Quisling was convicted after the war on illegal amendment of the Constitution.
- 15 April – About 500 Norwegian teachers are sent to forced labour in Kirkenes.
- 30 April – German forces destroy the entire Norwegian fishing village of Telavåg as a retaliation action after having discovered four days earlier that two men from the Linge company were being hidden in the village.
- 17 September – The prime minister Vidkun Quisling reintroduces the death penalty.
- 25 September – Allied bombers tried to bomb the Victoria Terrasse building in Oslo, which was used as the Gestapo headquarters, but missed the target and instead hit civilian targets. 4 civilians are killed.
- 6 October – Martial law is declared in Trondheim: During this time, 34 Norwegians were murdered by extrajudicial execution.
- 21 October – The German prisoner ship Palatia is sunk off Lindesnes by a Royal New Zealand Air Force torpedo bomber, in the second deadliest ship disaster in Norwegian history
- 26 October – All Jewish men in Norway over 15 are arrested; all Jewish property is ordered confiscated. See the Holocaust in Norway for more.
- 24 November – All Norwegian Jewish women and children are arrested.
- 26 November – 548 Norwegian Jewish men, women and children are transported on the ship SS Donau to Stettin. And from there they were later taken by train to Auschwitz concentration camp. Only eight of those deported on the SS Donau survived.
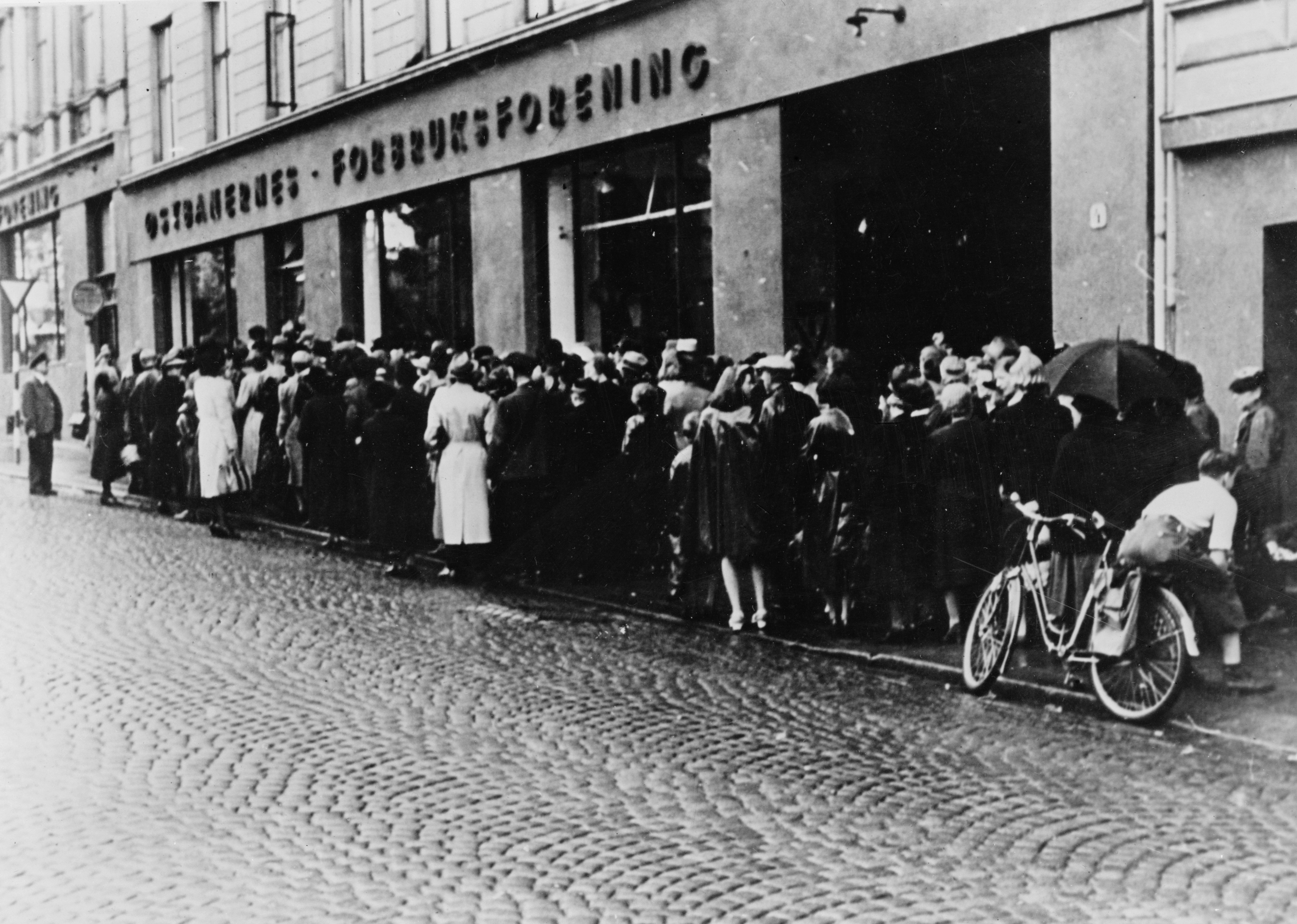
The German occupation saw a great rise in food shortages throughout Norway. Here people wait in line for food rations, Oslo, 1942.

== Notable births ==
=== January ===
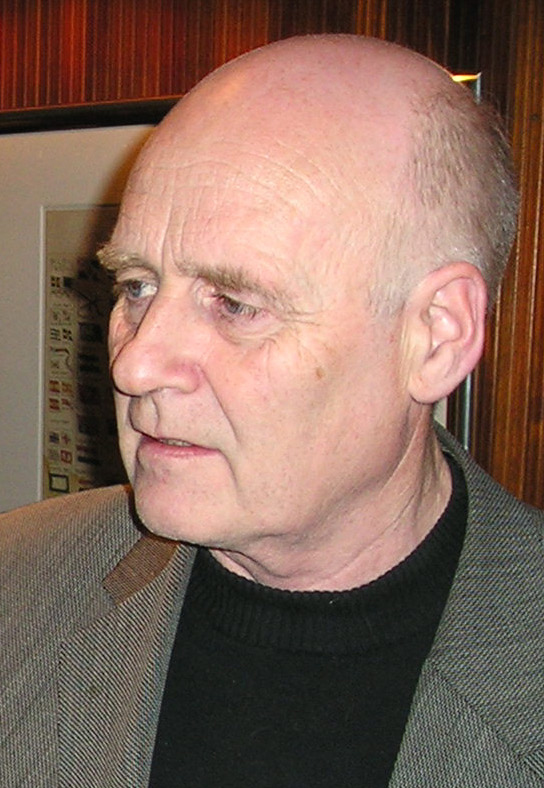
Kåre Gjønnes

- 2 January – Jens Petter Ekornes, businessperson (died 2008)
- 9 January –
  - Per Haddal, journalist, film critic and writer
  - Johan Lind, speed skater
- 13 January – Vigdis Ystad, literary historian (died 2019)
- 19 January – Knut O. Aarethun, politician
- 22 January – Steinar Maribo, politician
- 24 January
  - Nils Bjørnflaten, politician
  - Olav Nilsen, international soccer player
  - Vivian Zahl Olsen, artist, graphic designer and illustrator.
- 30 January – Kåre Gjønnes, politician and minister (died 2021)
- 31 January – Mette Newth, illustrator and author of children's literature

=== February ===
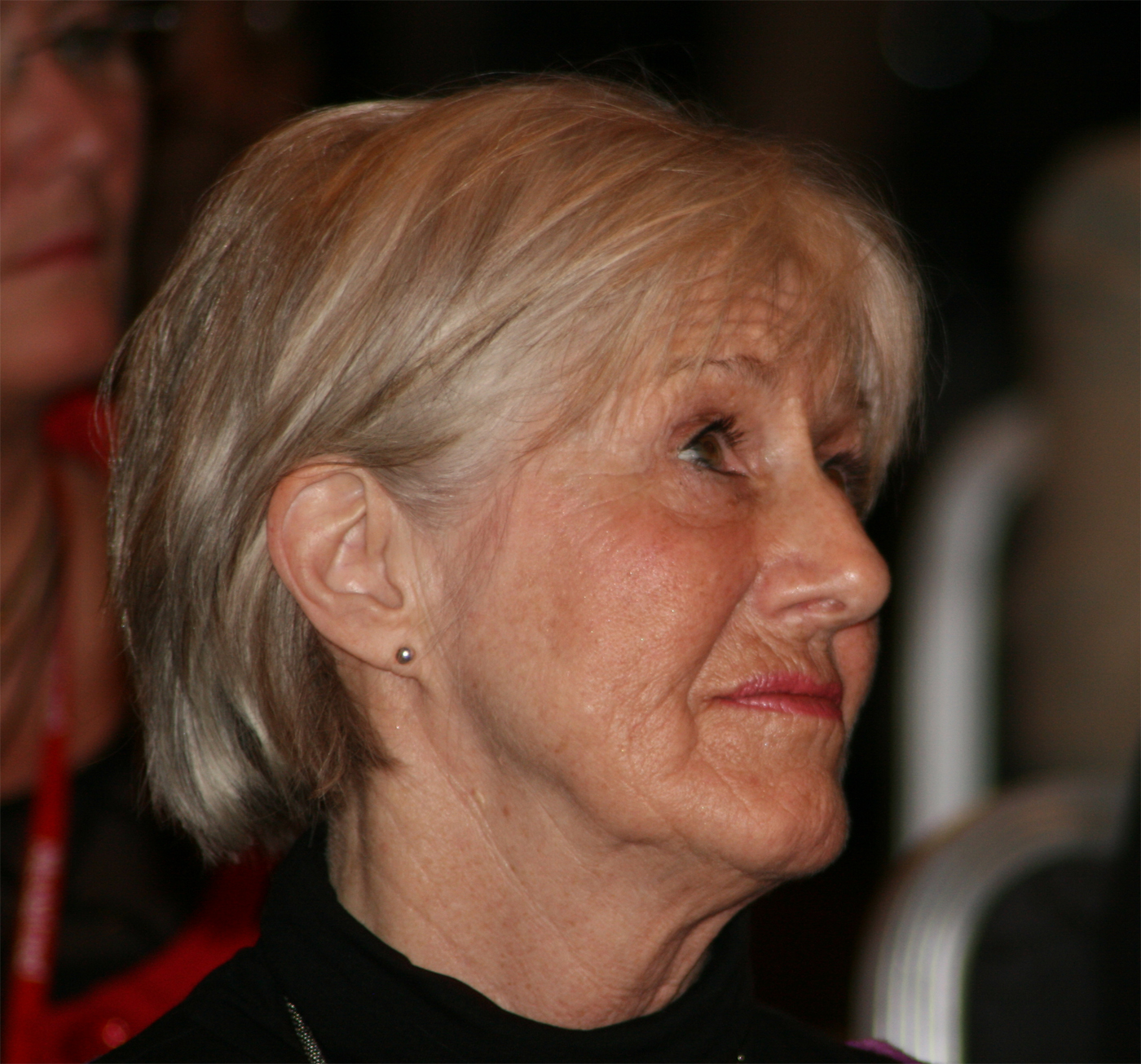
Oddny Aleksandersen

- 2 February – Trygve Bornø, international soccer player
- 5 February – Oddny Aleksandersen, politician and Minister
- 7 February – Otto Hauglin, sociologist and politician (died 2012).
- 9 February – Peder Lunde Jr., sailor and Olympic gold medallist
- 11 February – Arild Holm, alpine skier (died 2024).
- 12 February – Finn Arild Hvistendahl, businessperson
- 14 February – Arne Ruste, poet, essayist, novelist, and magazine editor (died 2026).
- 16 February – Else Michelet, satirical writer, radio show host and producer (died 2021).
- 18 February – Bernt Oftestad, historian and theologian
- 21 February – Anders C. Sjaastad, politician and Minister
- 28 February – Alf Ivar Samuelsen, politician

=== March ===
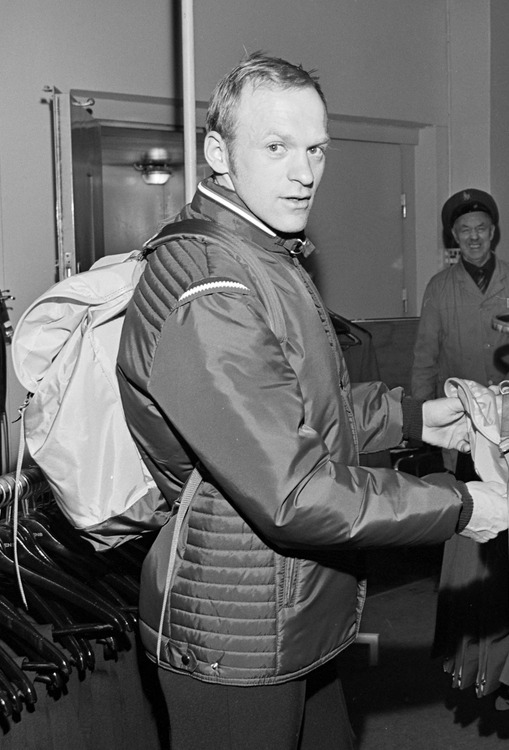
Pål Tyldum

- 7 March – Ivar Eriksen, speed skater and Olympic silver medallist
- 8 March – Håkon Fimland, hurdler and politician
- 10 March – Einar Steensnæs, politician and Minister
- 12 March – Karin Lian, politician
- 28 March – Stig Berge, orienteer and World Champion
- 28 March – Pål Tyldum, cross country skier and double Olympic gold medallist
- 31 March – Hans Jacob Biørn Lian, diplomat

=== April ===
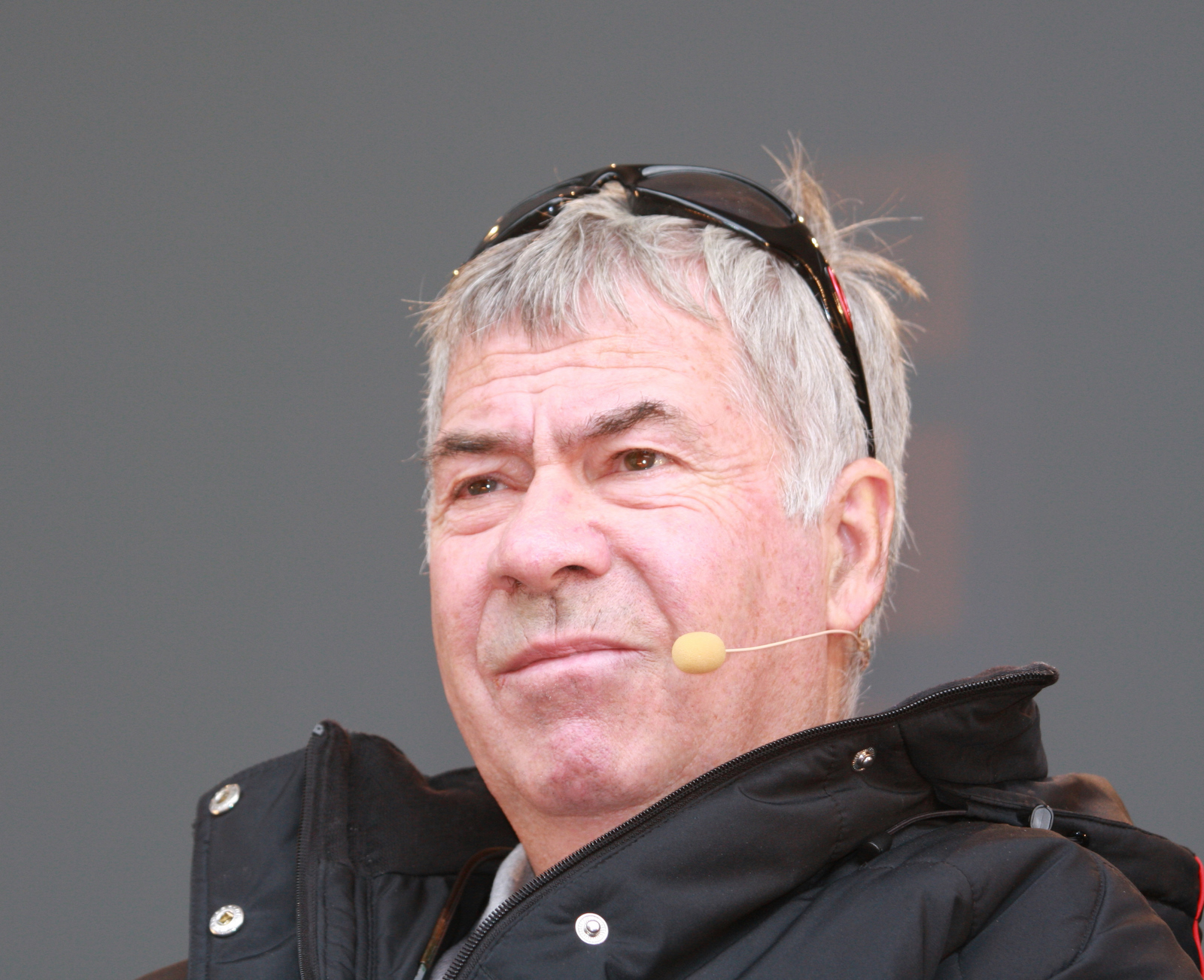
Egil Olsen

- 1 April – Jan Fredrik Christiansen, trumpeter
- 2 April – Torgeir Kvalvaag, journalist
- 7 April – Bjørn Gunnar Olsen, journalist, novelist, playwright and biographer (died 1992).
- 8 April – Reidar Goa, footballer (died 2018).
- 21 April – Jon Mostad, composer.
- 22 April – Egil "Drillo" Olsen, international soccer player and coach

=== May ===
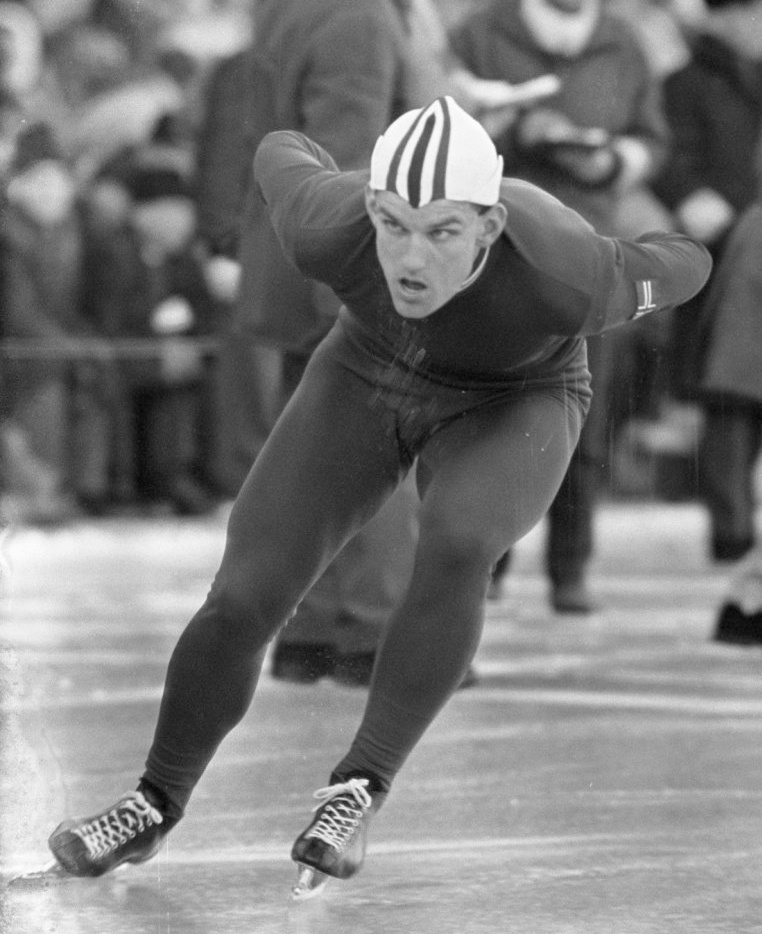
Svein-Erik Stiansen

- 5 May – Kjetil Hasund, footballer.
- 6 May – Svein-Erik Stiansen, speed skater.
- 21 May – Tharald Brøvig Jr., ship-owner and investor (died 2017).
- 31 May – Olav Skjevesland, theologian and priest (died 2019).

=== June ===
- 6 June – Ingrid Piltingsrud, politician
- 9 June – Egil Myklebust, businessperson and lawyer
- 11 June – Per Willy Guttormsen, speed skater
- 15 June – Bjørg Andersen, handball player.
- 17 June – Torgrim Sollid, jazz and traditional folk trumpeter, and composer and musician
- 18 June – Knut Grøholt, civil servant
- 21 June – Ditlef Eckhoff, jazz trumpeter
- 22 June – Åge Danielsen, civil servant.

=== July ===
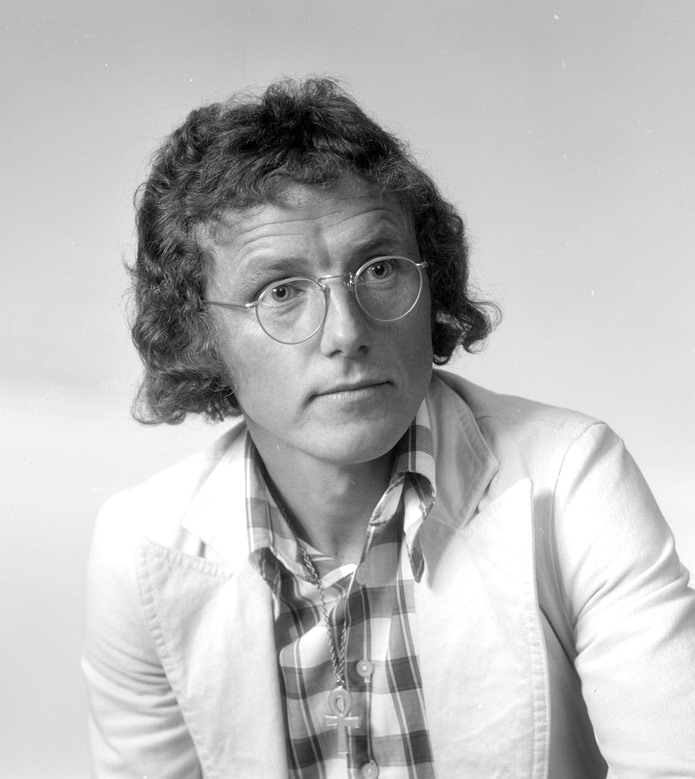
Sverre Asmervik

- 13 July – Sigrid Sundby, speed skater (died 1977).
- 15 July – Signe Howell, social anthropologist (died 2025).
- 16 July – Jens Ulltveit-Moe, businessperson
- 23 July – Sverre Asmervik, psychologist, novelist and non-fiction writer.
- 23 July – Anne Aaserud, art historian and museum director (died 2017).
- 30 July – Harald Bjorvand, linguist.
- 31 July – Triztán Vindtorn, poet and performance artist (died 2009).

=== August ===
- 7 August – Sverre Bagge, historian
- 9 August – Odd Flattum, sports official and politician
- 11 August – Tove Kari Viken, politician
- 12 August – Eldrid Nordbø, politician and Minister
- 22 August – Finn Fuglestad, historian
- 25 August – Terje Fjærn, musician, orchestra leader and musical conductor (died 2016)
- 28 August – Sigurd Manneråk, politician (died 2003)
- 28 August – Tor Berntin Næss, diplomat

=== September ===
- 5 September – Björn Haugan, operatic lyric tenor
- 9 September – Ulf Guttormsen, politician
- 13 September – Bjørg Hope Galtung, politician
- 20 September – Einar M. Bull, diplomat
- 24 September – Leif Lund, politician (died 2004)
- 25 September – Ragnar Pedersen, illustrator ("Joker"), magazine editor and revue writer (died 2007).
- 29 September - Kirsten Reitan, politician

=== October ===
- 2 October – Gro Sandvik, classical flautist
- 11 October – Leif Yli, cyclist.
- 14 October – Arne Torp, linguist.

=== November ===
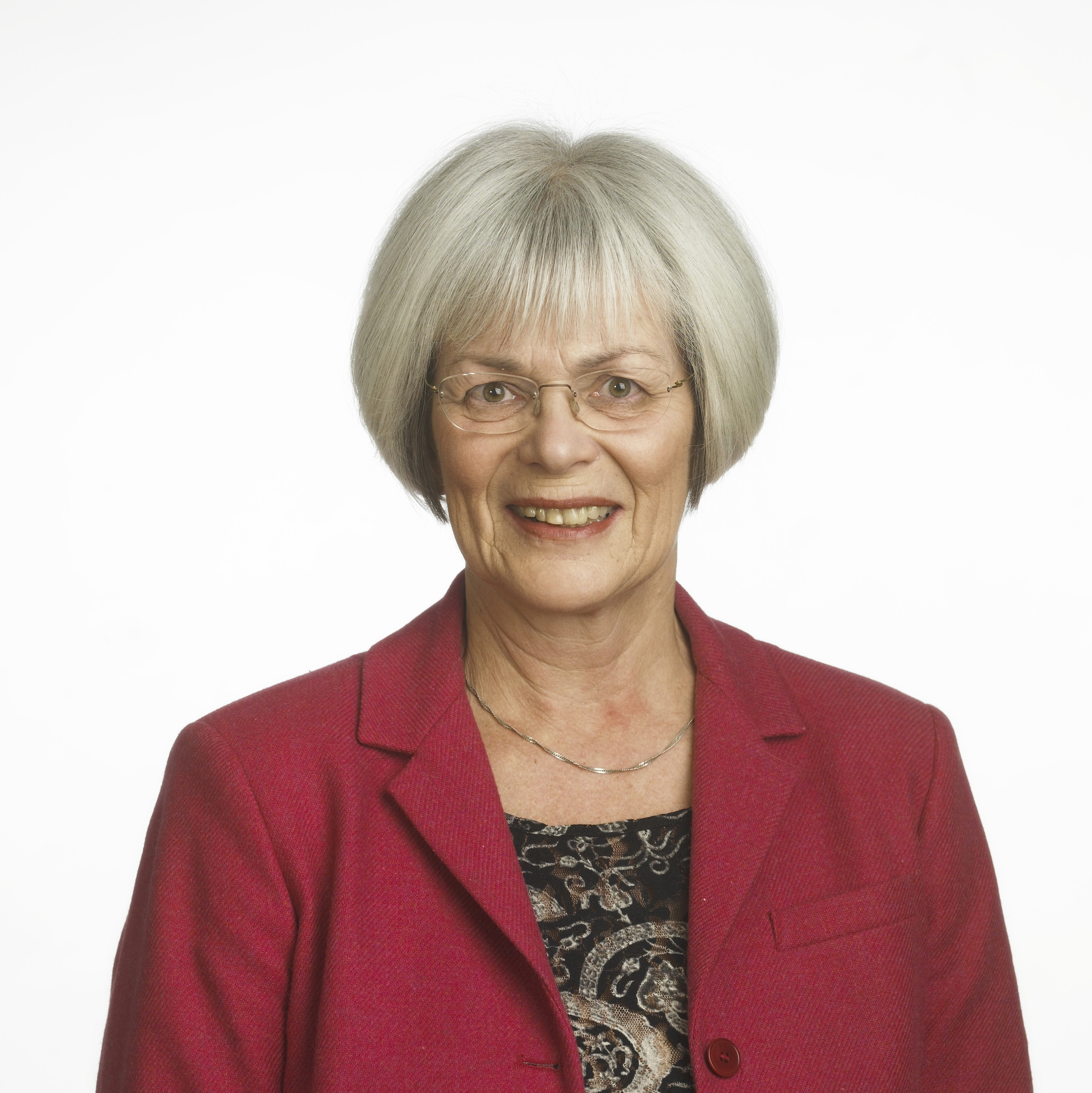
Tora Aasland

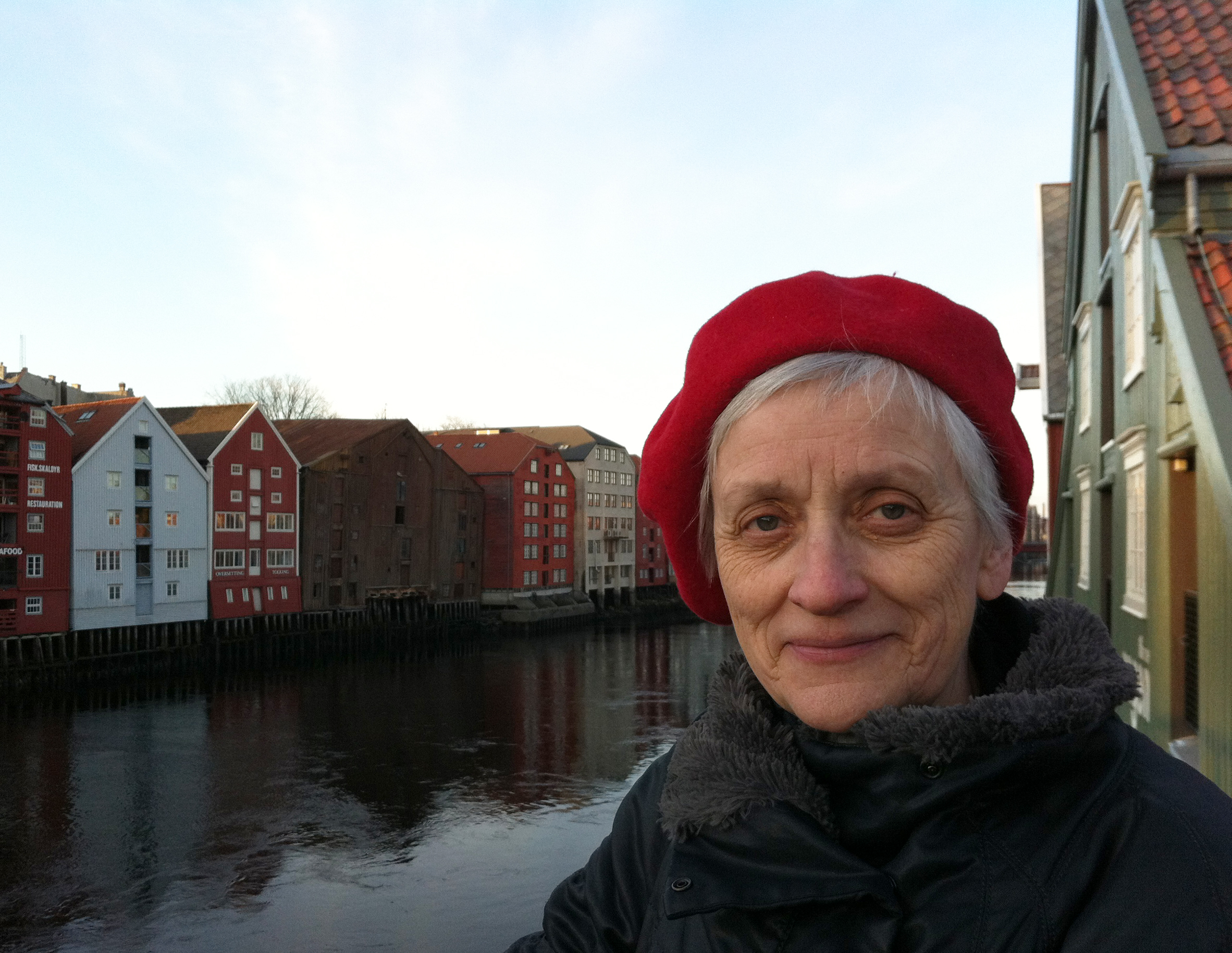
Sissel Lie

- 6 November –
  - Tora Aasland, politician and Minister
  - Gunhild Hagestad, sociologist.
- 12 November –
  - Aud Inger Aure, politician and Minister
  - Sissel Lie, author, playwright and professor.
- 14 November – Are Næss, physician and politician
- 15 November – Ivar Østberg, politician
- 16 November – Hans Olav Sørensen, ski jumper
- 18 November – Olav Sønderland, police officer (died 2023).
- 19 November – Berit Kvæven, politician
- 24 November – Erling Walderhaug, politician
- 26 November – Jan Stenerud, American football placekicker
- 29 November – Oddrun Hokland, athlete (died 2022).

=== December ===
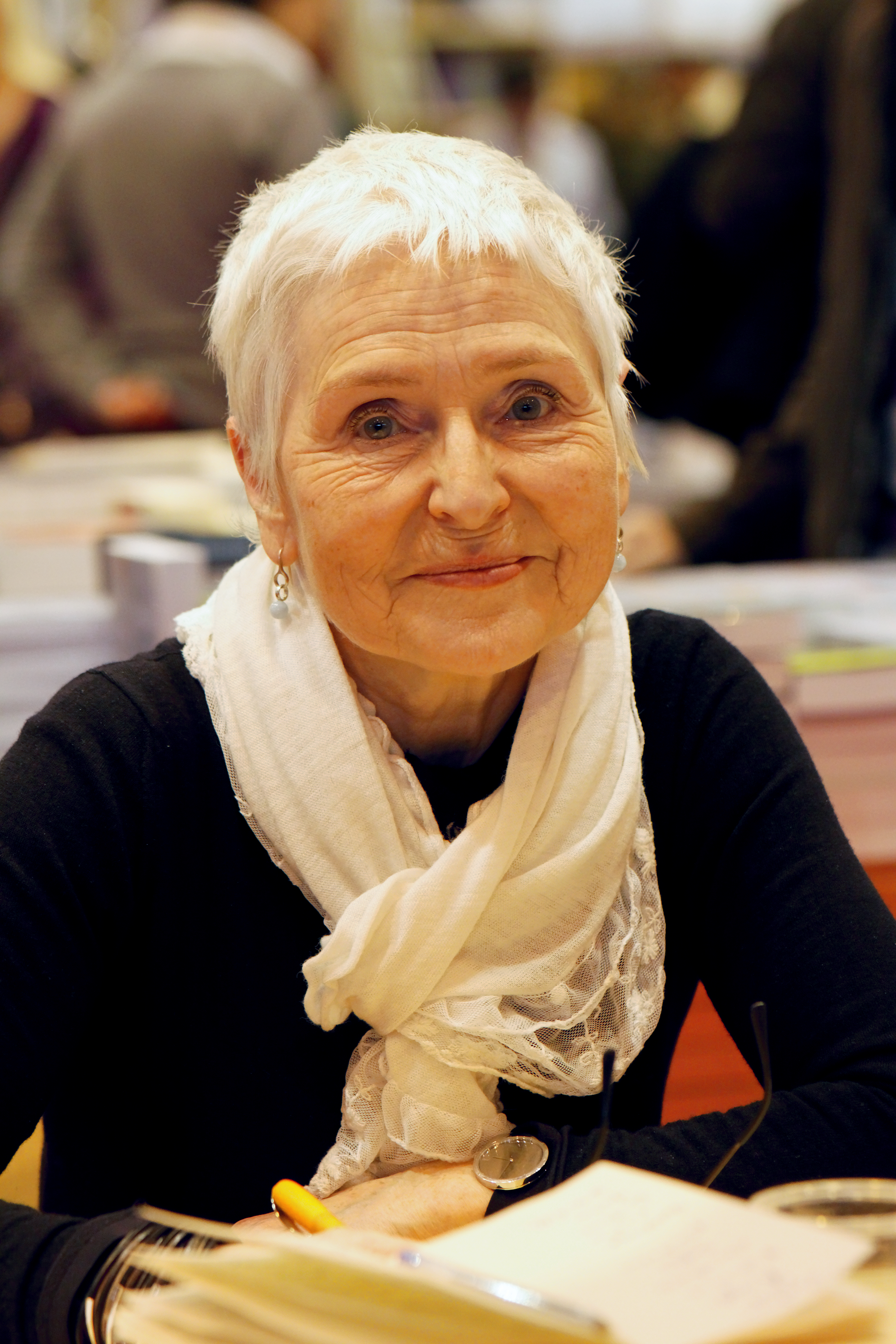
Herbjørg Wassmo in 2011

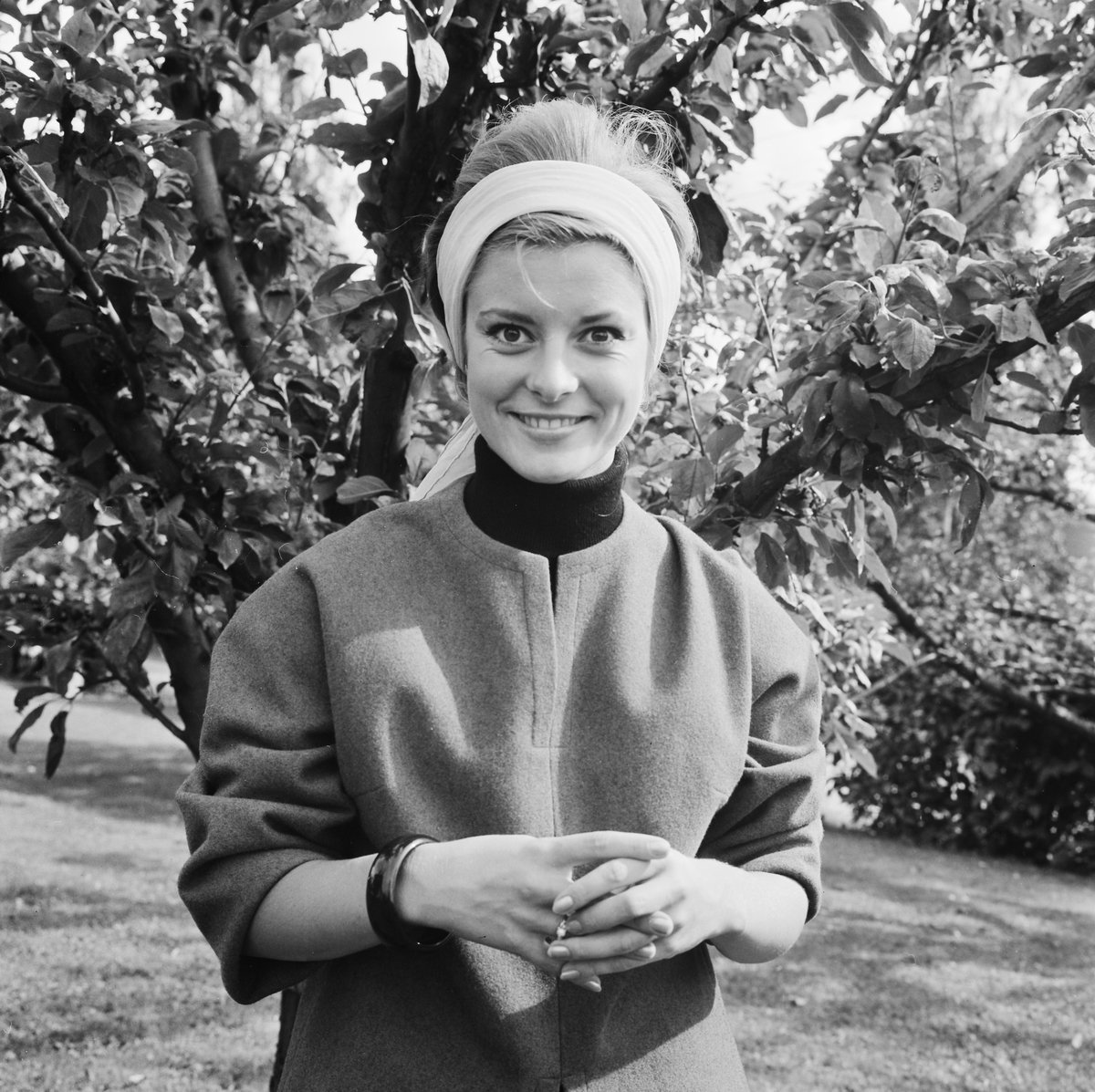
Grynet Molvig in 1964

- 6 December – Herbjørg Wassmo, author
- 8 December – Eyvind W. Wang, politician
- 13 December – Arne Treholt, politician and diplomat convicted of high treason and espionage on behalf of the Soviet Union and Iraq
- 19 December – Brit Hoel, politician
- 20 December – Odd Martinsen, cross country skier, Olympic gold medallist and World Champion.
- 21 December –
  - Ivar Langen, professor of Mechanical Engineering
  - Rodney Riise, ice hockey player (died 2009).
- 23 December – Grynet Molvig, actress and singer
- 28 December – Svein Magnus Håvarstein, sculptor and printmaker (died 2013).
- 31 December – Bendik Rugaas, politician and Minister

=== Full date unknown ===
- Idun Reiten, mathematician.
- John Kristen Skogan, political scientist and politician

== Notable deaths ==
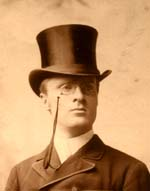
Bjørn Bjørnson

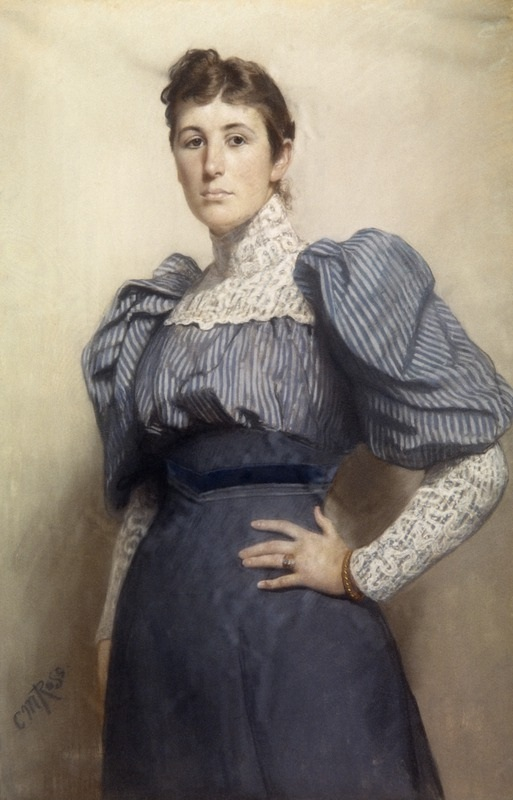
Nini Roll Anker

- 16 January – Henry Wilhelm Kristiansen, newspaper editor and politician (born 1902)
- 19 January – Sven Aarrestad, writer, politician and leader in the Norwegian temperance movement (born 1850)
- 19 January – Martin Ulvestad, Norwegian-American historian and author (born 1865)
- 29 January – Wictor Esbensen, mariner and explorer (born 1881)
- 10 February – Jørgen Bjørnstad, gymnast and Olympic silver medallist (born 1894)
- 10 February – Ola Thommessen, newspaper editor (born 1851)
- 22 February – Rolf Jacobsen, jurist, politician and Minister (born 1865)
- 28 February – Arne Mortensen, rower and Olympic bronze medallist (born 1900)
- 4 March – Johannes Stubberud, newspaper editor (born 1891)
- 7 March – Ole Monsen Mjelde, politician and Minister (born 1865)
- 24 March – Karenus Kristofer Thinn, judge (born 1850)
- 20 April – Helga Estby, noted for her walk across the United States during 1896 (born 1860)
- 13 May – Einar Sverdrup, mining engineer and businessman (born 1895)
- 14 May – Bjørn Bjørnson, actor and theatre director (born 1859)
- 20 May – Nini Roll Anker, novelist and playwright (born 1873).
- 23 May – Sten Abel, sailor and Olympic silver medallist (born 1872)
- 27 June – Jens Thiis, art historian, conservator and museum director (born 1870)
- 15 July – Ragnvald A. Nestos, governor of the U.S. state of North Dakota (born 1877)
- 21 July – Nils Olaf Hovdenak, politician and Minister (born 1854)
- 6 October – Harald Langhelle, newspaper editor and politician (born 1890)
- 25 October – Gulbrand Lunde, chemist and politician, Nazi collaborator (born 1901) (born 1901)
- 1 November – Carl Fredrik Kolderup, geologist (born 1869).
- 5 December – Adolf Indrebø, politician (born 1884)

=== Full date unknown ===
- Alfred Evensen, musician (born 1883)
- Niels Thorshaug, veterinarian (born 1875)
