= 2025 in Norway =

- Centuries: 19th; 20th; 21st
- Decades: 2000s; 2010s; 2020s
- See also: List of years in Norway

Events in the year 2025 in Norway.

== Incumbents ==
- Monarch – Harald V.
- President of the Storting – Masud Gharahkhani (Labour).
- Prime Minister – Jonas Gahr Støre (Labour).

== Events ==
=== January ===
- 8 January – 2 February – The 2025 World Men's Handball Championship in Croatia, Denmark and Norway.

=== February ===
- 4 February – Former prime minister Jens Stoltenberg is appointed as finance minister in the Støre Cabinet after his predecessor, Trygve Slagsvold Vedum and his Centre Party withdraw from the coalition government. This results in Norway's first single-party government since 2001.

=== March ===
- 24 March – The trial of athletics coach Gjert Ingebrigtsen for alleged domestic violence commences in Sør-Rogaland District Court.
- 31 March – The first instance of an orbital rocket launched from Europe (excluding Russia), by Isar Aerospace from Andøya Spaceport, lasts for about 40 seconds before it crashes into the sea.

=== April ===
- 3 April – Around 147 kilograms of cocaine valued at 170 million kroner ($16.4 million) are discovered by employees of a fruit distributor in nine boxes of bananas that originated in South America in the largest drug bust in Norway since 2023.

=== May ===
- 17 May – Norway's Kyle Alessandro finishes in 18th place at Eurovision 2025 in Switzerland with the single "Lighter".
- 22 May – The Cyprus-flagged cargo vessel NCL Salten runs aground along the Trondheim Fjord in Byneset. No injuries are reported.

=== June ===
- 5 June – The Storting approves a bill seeking to impose a three-percent tax on tourist accommodation as part of efforts to combat overtourism.
- 11 June — Norway joins New Zealand, Canada, the United Kingdom and Australia in banning and freezing the assets of two far-right Israeli government ministers Itamar Ben-Gvir and Bezalel Smotrich for advocating violence and the displacement of Palestinians.
- 11 June — Gjert Ingebrigtsen, the father of athlete Jakob Ingebrigtsen, is convicted of abusing Jakob's younger sister and sentenced to a 15-day suspended prison sentence and pay NOK 10,000 ($1,010) in damages by the Sør-Rogaland District Court, which acquits him on charges of abusing Jacob.
- 27 June – Marius Borg Høiby is charged with multiple counts of rape and sexual assault.
- 28 June – Tonje Sagstuen resigns as managing director of Norsk Tipping, following grave errors in the lottery prize announcements the day before. Prize money were erroneously reported as too high, having been multiplied with 100 rather than divided by 100.

=== August ===
- 11 August – The Government Pension Fund of Norway announces its divestment from 11 Israeli companies amid criticism over Israel's conduct in the Gaza war.
- 24 August – 34-year old youth care worker Tamima Nibras Juhar is killed at work in Kampen, Oslo. The 18-year old male suspect is previously known by the Police Security Service for habouring "right-wing extremist sentiments".
- 30 August – A landslide removes a portion of the European route E6 in Levanger Municipality.

=== September ===
- 8 September –
  - 2025 Norwegian parliamentary election: The Labour Party wins a plurality of 52 seats in the Storting, followed by the Progress Party with 48 seats.
  - 2025 Norwegian Sámi parliamentary election
- 12 September – The Government Pension Fund of Norway announces its divestment from the French mining firm Eramet, citing concerns over its involvement in human rights violations and environmental damage at the Weda Bay Industrial Park in Indonesia.
- 16 September – Norway signs a free trade agreement with the Mercosur bloc.
- 22 September – Unidentified drones are seen flying over Oslo Airport, resulting in major disruptions to aviation.

=== October ===
- 15 October – A former security guard at the US Embassy in Oslo is convicted and sentenced to more than three years' imprisonment for spying on behalf of Russia and Iran.

=== December ===
- 3 December – The government imposes a four-year moratorium on issuing licenses for deep-sea mining in the Arctic Ocean.
- 8 December – A man is arrested after opening fire inside a shopping center in Oslo.
- 28 December – Around 32,000 homes in Nordland and Innlandet lose electricity due to Storm Johannes.

=== Scheduled ===
- Norway aims to ban the sale of all new diesel and petrol cars by this year.

== Anniversaries ==
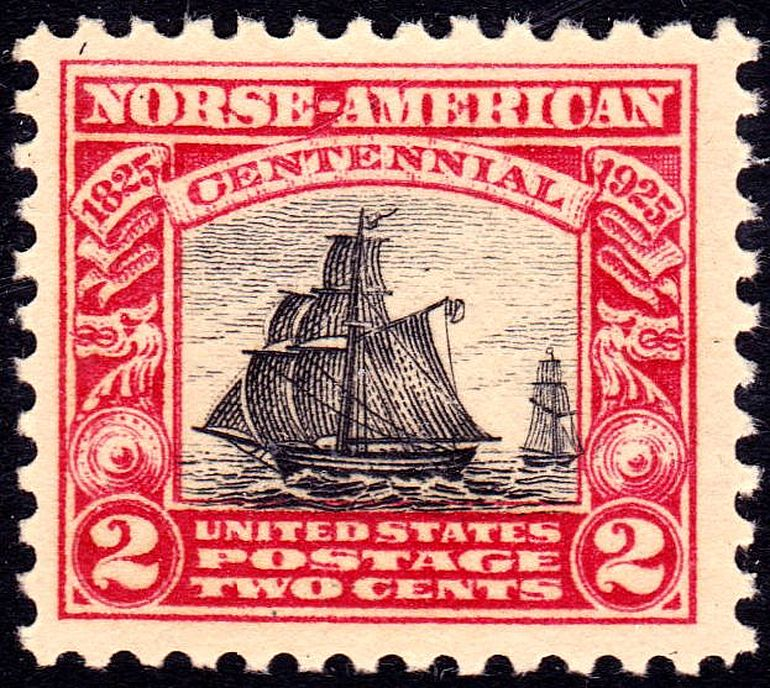
U.S. postage stamp featuring the ship Restauration issued in 1925 in honor of the 100th anniversary of Norwegian immigration

- 13 March – 200 years since the birth of Hans Gude.
- 29 April – 100 years since broadcasting started in Norway.
- 10 June – 200 years since the birth of Sondre Norheim.
- 29 June – 100 years since the death of Christian Michelsen.
- 28 August – 50 years since the release of the animated film Flåklypa Grand Prix.
- 1 October – 200 years since the foundation stone was laid for the Royal Palace, Oslo.
- 9 October – 200 years since the first organized emigration from Norway to America, when the sloop Restauration arrived in New York.
- 16 October – 100 years since the death of Christian Krohg.

== Holidays ==
- 1 January – New Year's Day
- 17 April – Maundy Thursday
- 18 April – Good Friday
- 20 April – Easter Sunday
- 21 April – Easter Monday
- 1 May – Labour Day
- 17 May – Constitution Day
- 29 May – Ascension Day
- 8 June – Pentecost
- 9 June – Whit Monday
- 24 December – Christmas Day
- 25 December – Second Day of Christmas

== Art and entertainment ==
- List of Norwegian submissions for the Academy Award for Best International Feature Film
- 53rd Norwegian International Film Festival

== Sports ==
- 5 January – Johannes Høsflot Klæbo and Therese Johaug win the 2024–25 Tour de Ski for men and women respectively.
- 13 January – Three-time Champions League winner Vipers Kristiansand declares bankruptcy and is evicted from the 2024–25 handball league.
- 22 January – The member clubs of Norsk Toppfotball vote (19 to 13) to work for the abolishment of video assistant refereeing.
- 15 February – The 2025 Nordic Junior World Ski Championships concludes, with Norway atop the medal table, among others with seven out of seven possible gold medals in cross-country skiing (U20).
- 26 February–9 March – The FIS Nordic World Ski Championships 2025 is held in Trondheim.

- Norway wins 14 gold medals and finishes first in the medal table. Johannes Høsflot Klæbo wins every single race in the men's cross-country skiing.

- 1 March – The national convention of the Football Association of Norway votes to retain video assistant refereeing.
- 2 March – The national convention of the Football Association of Norway votes to stage the Norwegian football cup finals for men and women in the spring rather than in the late fall, as has been tradition since its inception.
- 6–9 March – Norway takes three gold medals and finishes third in the medal table at the 2025 European Athletics Indoor Championships.
- 9 March – The director of sports in the elite ski jumping section of the Norwegian Ski Federation, Jan Erik Aalbu, publicly admits that the ski jumping team illegally tampered with their gear to enhance performances.
- 9 March – FK Bodø/Glimt advance to the quarter-final of the 2024–25 UEFA Europa League, as Kasper Høgh concurrently moves into position as top goalscorer of the tournament.
- 13–16 March – The 2025 World Single Distances Speed Skating Championships is held in Hamar.

- Norway wins three gold medals and finishes third in the medal table.

- 16 March – Jarl Magnus Riiber races for the last time in Nordic combined.
- 21–23 March – Norway takes three gold medals and finishes second in the medal table at the 2025 World Athletics Indoor Championships.

- Jakob Ingebrigtsen took Norway's first gold medal at the World Athletics Indoor Championships since 1995, and Ingebrigtsen became the first male athlete from any country to win back-to-back gold medals at the World Athletics Indoor Championships since 1999.

- 23 March – Tarjei Bø and Johannes Thingnes Bø race for the last time in biathlon.
- 17 April – FK Bodø/Glimt becomes the first Norwegian men's team to advance to a semi-final in a UEFA competition, eliminating Lazio from the 2024–25 UEFA Europa League. Bodø/Glimt is eliminated by Tottenham Hotspur in the semi-final.
- 1 May – Felix Ørn-Kristoff wins the Tour de Bretagne in cycling.
- 4 May – Casper Ruud wins the Madrid Open in tennis, his first career win in a Masters 1000 tournament.
- 16 July – Jonas Abrahamsen wins Stage 11 of the 2025 Tour de France.
- 16 July – Norway is eliminated from the UEFA Women's Euro 2025 quarter-finals, having previously won Group A.
- 17–20 July – The 2025 European Athletics U23 Championships are held at Fana stadion.

- Henriette Jæger wins gold in the 400 metres and silver in the 200 metres – on the same day.

- 27 July – Tobias Halland Johannessen finishes 6th in the 2025 Tour de France, the highest ever placement by a Norwegian cyclist.
- 26 August – FK Bodø/Glimt qualifies for the 2025–26 UEFA Champions League league phase, having beat Sturm Graz 6–2 on aggregate in the playoff round.
- 27 August – SK Brann qualifies for the 2025–26 UEFA Europa League league phase, having beat AEK Larnaca 6–1 on aggregate in the playoff round.
- 11 October – Solveig Løvseth wins the Ironman World Championship in Hawaii.
- 16 November – Norway qualifies for the 2026 FIFA World Cup after defeating Italy 4-1 at the 2026 FIFA World Cup qualification in Milan.

== Deaths ==
=== January ===
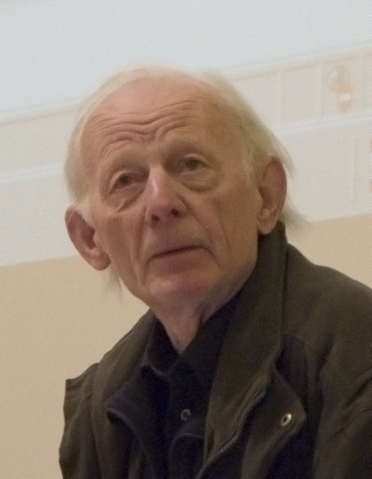
Håkon Bleken

- 4 January – Elisabeth Haarr, textile artist (born 1945).
- 7 January – Øyvind Vågnes, writer, editor, and professor of media science (born 1972).
- 8 January –
  - Kjell Kjær, actor (born 1942).
  - Karsten Klepsvik, diplomat (born 1952).
- 10 January – Einar Olav Skogholt, politician (born 1947).
- 13 January – Kjell Svindland, politician (born 1933).
- 14 January –
  - Kjell Gjerseth, journalist (born 1946).
  - Hans Stenberg-Nilsen, jurist and Supreme Court attorney (born 1930).
- 20 January – Harald Paalgard, cinematographer (born 1950).
- 21 January – Tore Austad, politician (born 1935).
- 21 January – Håkon Bleken, painter (born 1929).
- 26 January –
  - Signe Howell, social anthropologist (born 1942).
  - Asbjørn Larsen, industrial leader (born 1936).
- 27 January – Anna Hannevik, Salvation Army commissioner (born 1925).
- 30 January – Kåre Øvregard, politician (born 1933).
- 31 January – Brynjar Aa, writer and playwright (born 1960).
- 31 January – Sigurd Erlend Reksnes, politician (born 1977).
- 31 January – Karl Sørmo, politician (born 1936).

=== February ===
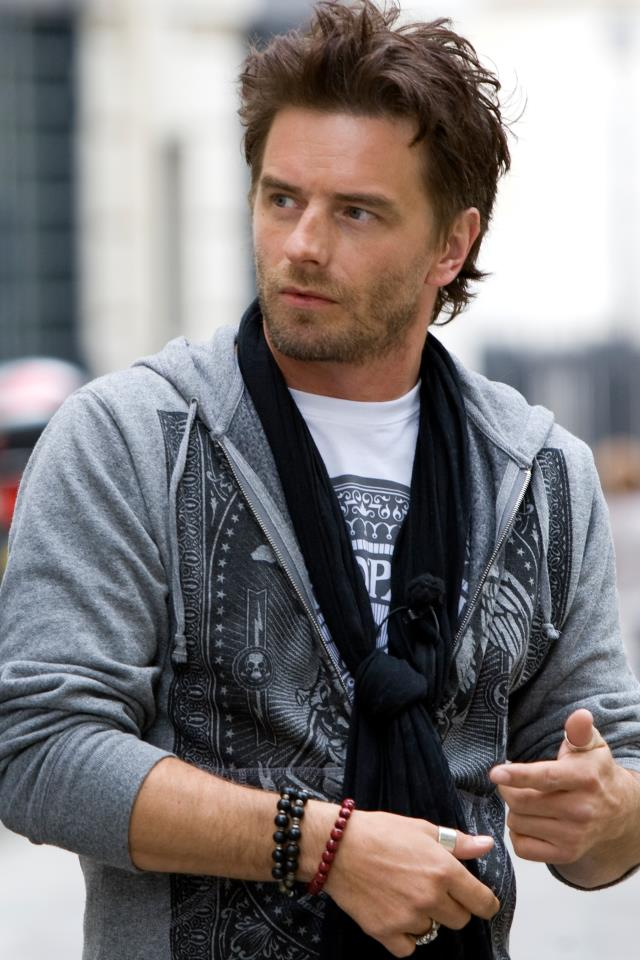
Bjørn Opsahl

- 11 February – Knut Flatin, painter and printmaker (born 1945).
- 12 February – Barthold Halle, stage instructor, film director and theatre director (born 1925).
- 21 February – Alf Bakke, entomologist and forest researcher (born 1927).
- 26 February –
  - Bjørn Ludvigsen, footballer (born 1969).
  - Kjell Alrich Schumann, convicted robber and murderer (born 1966).
- 27 February –
  - Bjørn Opsahl, photographer and film director (born 1968).
  - Kjartan Rødland, journalist and newspaper editor (born 1938).

=== March ===
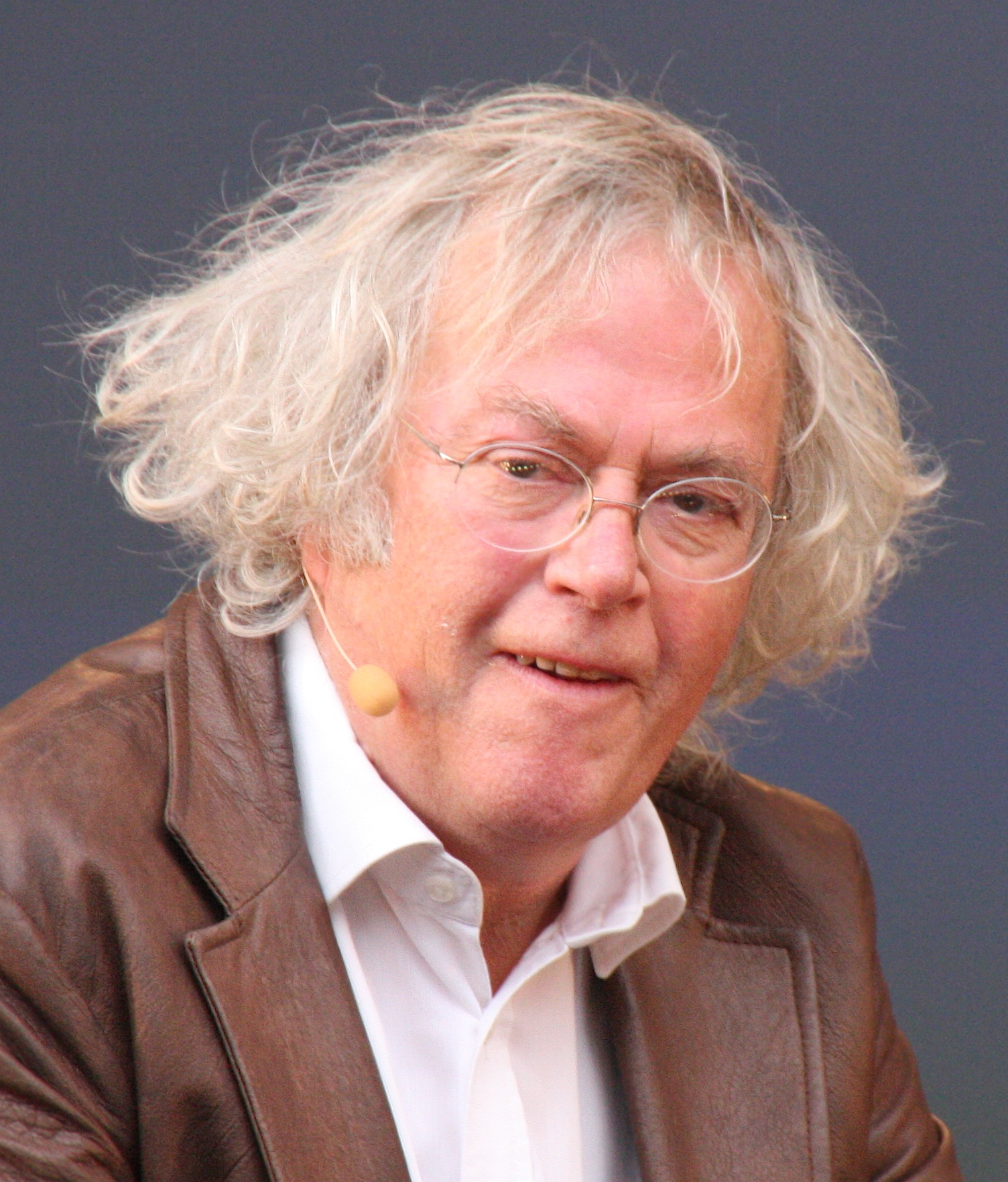
Dag Solstad

- 7 March – Narve Bjørgo, historian (born 1936).
- 13 March – Einar Kringlen, psychiatrist (born 1931).
- 14 March – Dag Solstad, writer (born 1941).
- 15 March — Esten Gjelten, biathlete (born 1942).
- 19 March – Peder Widding, politician (born 1931).
- 25 March – Bjørn Johansen, ice hockey player (born 1944).
- 26 March – Rolf Groven, painter (born 1943).
- 28 March – Bjørn Simensen, newspaper editor and opera director (born 1947).

=== April ===
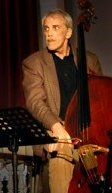
Terje Venaas

- 3 April – Knut Brofoss, civil servant (born 1948).
- 4 April – Aanund Hylland, economist (born 1949).
- 5 April – Birger Vestermo, cross-country skier (born 1930).
- c.9 April – Terje Venaas, jazz musician (born 1947).
- 10 April – Arne Hamarsland, middle-distance runner (born 1933).
- 11 April – Øyunn Grindem Mogstad, high jumper (born 1987).
- 12 April – Johan Fredrik Grøgaard, writer (born 1934).
- 14 April – Christian Reim, jazz musician (born 1945).
- 16 April – Roar Jens Haugen, army general (born 1943).
- 17 April – Metkel Betew, bank robber (born 1978).
- 18 April – Lars Gunnar Lie, politician (born 1938).
- 20 April – Arild Underdal, political scientist (born 1946).
- 22 April – Odd Magne Gridseth, jazz musician (born 1959).
- 30 April – Kari Løvaas, operatic soprano (born 1939).

=== May ===
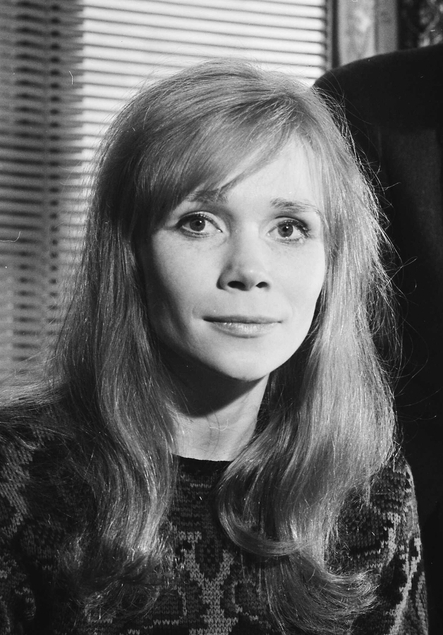
Monna Tandberg

- 1 May – Irma Moen Eriksen, politician (born 1934).
- 3 May – Alv Egeland, physicist (born 1932).
- 4 May – Øyvind Thorsen, journalist, writer (born 1943).
- 5 May – Bendik Rugaas, librarian and politician (born 1942).
- 7 May – Otto Homlung, theatre director (born 1943).
- 11 May – Nils Bjørnflaten, politician (born 1942).
- 18 May – Åse Frogner, textile artist (born 1934).
- 21 May – Jørgen Gunnerud, writer (born 1948).
- 22 May – Morten Steenstrup, barrister and politician (born 1953).
- 23 May – Tore Haugen, politician (born 1931).
- 23 May – Tor Kvarv, painter and illustrator (born 1953).
- 25 May – Monna Tandberg, actress (born 1939).

=== June ===
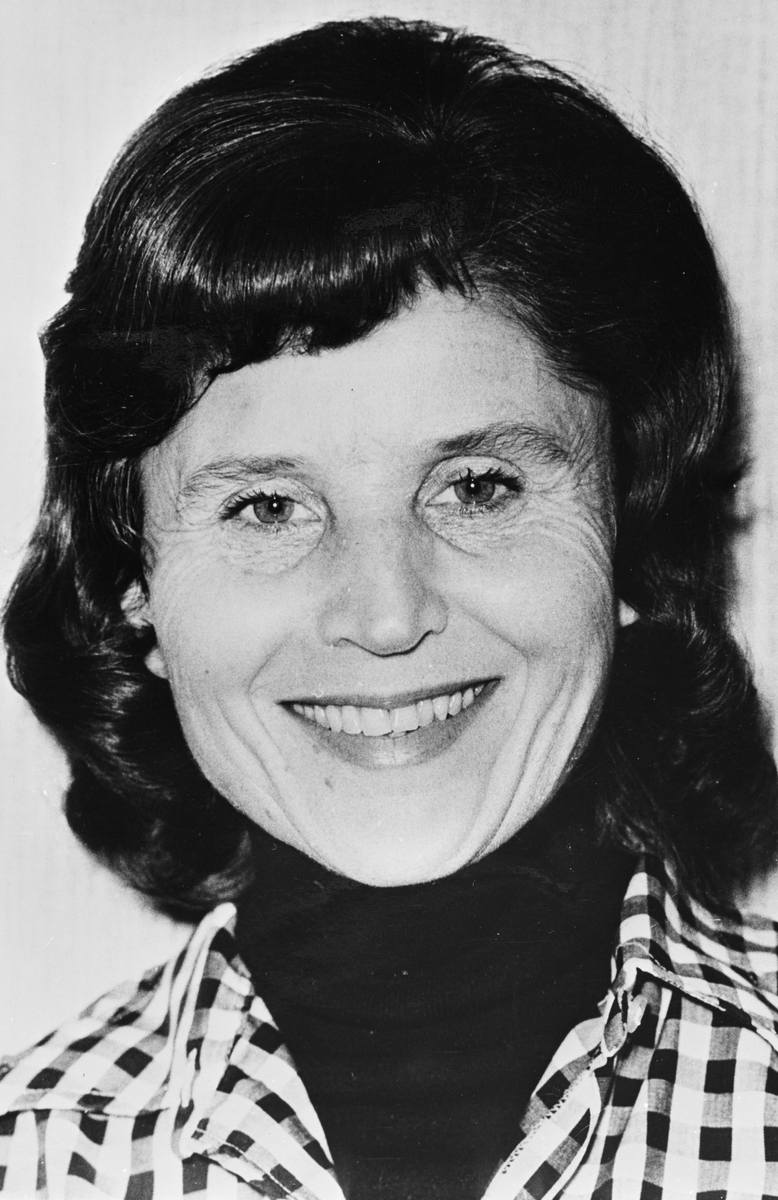
Else Breen

- 9 June – Axel Skalstad, jazz drummer (born 1992).
- 11 June – Magnus Aarbakke, judge (born 1934).
- 11 June – Jon Eikemo, actor (born 1939).
- 11 June – Einar Olsen, newspaper editor (born 1936).
- 11 June – Else Breen, children's writer (born 1927).
- 11 June – Olaf Almenningen, lexicographer (born 1947).
- 16 June – Einar Johansen, politician (born 1941).
- 19 June – Geirr Lystrup, musician and writer (born 1949).
- 21 June – Erik Dammann, environmentalist and non-fiction writer (born 1931).
- 23 June – Øyvind Østerud, political scientist (born 1944).
- June – Johannes Eide, businessman (born 1937).
- 26 June – Kine Aune, animated film director (born 1943).

=== July ===
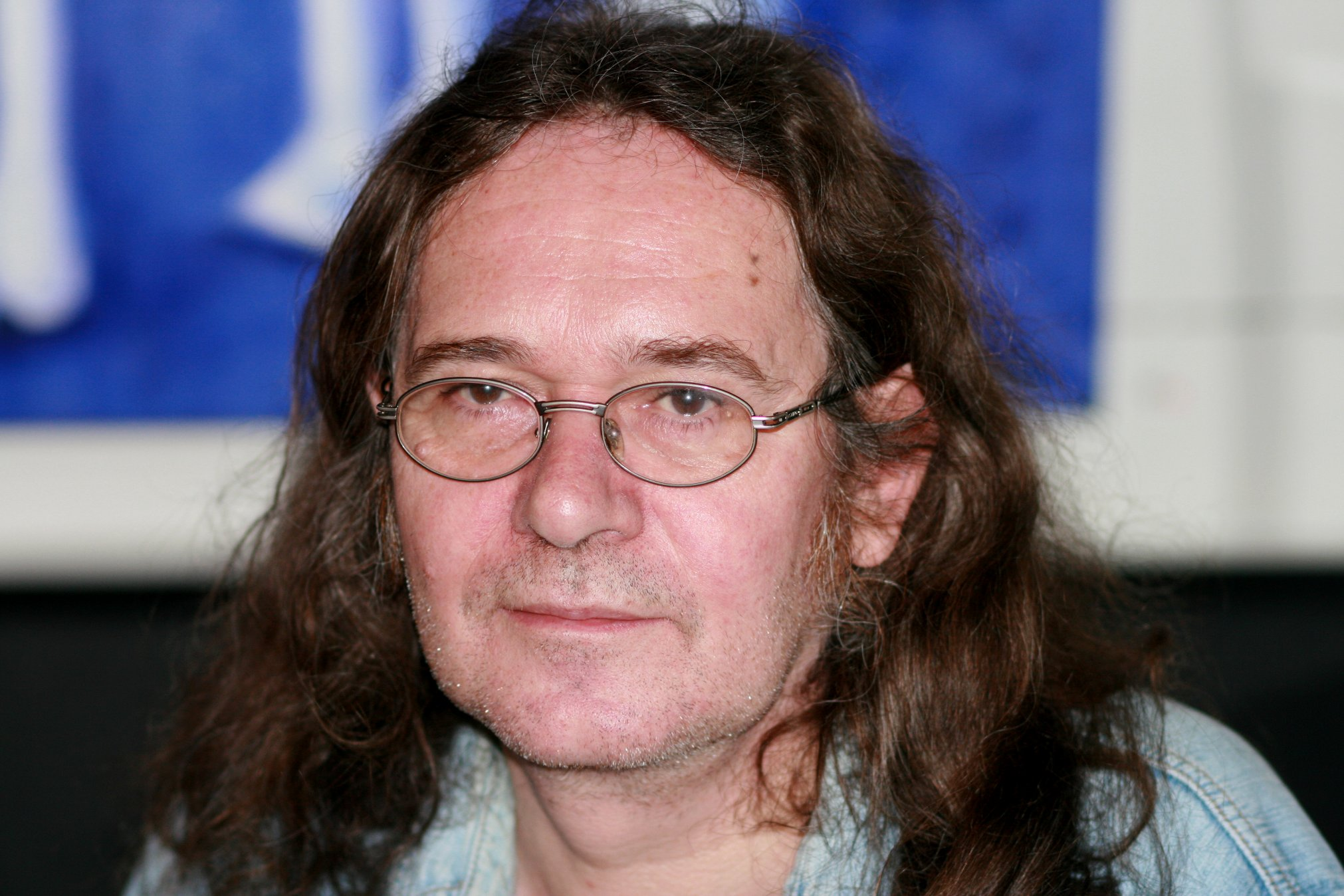
Ingvar Ambjørnsen

- 2 July – Odvar Omland, politician (born 1923).
- 3 July – Tormod Lislerud, discus thrower (born 1940).
- 5 July – Eli Kristiansen, nurse and politician (born 1933).
- 6 July – Jan Engsmyr, politician (born 1944).
- 11 July – Sylvi Graham, politician (born 1951).
- 14 July – Sverre Frich, Jr., businessperson and politician (born 1952).
- 14 July – Lars Vatten, epidemiologist (born 1952).
- 16 July – Reidar Jensen, writer (born 1942).
- 16 July – Asbjørn Jordahl, politician (born 1932).
- 16 July – Audun Grønvold, alpine and freestyle skier (born 1976).
- 19 July – Ingvar Ambjørnsen, writer (born 1956).
- 22 July – Lars Akerhaug, writer (born 1981).
- 25 July – Grete Rønning, ceramicist (born 1937).
- 29 July – Rakel Surlien, judge and politician (born 1944).
- 30 July – Per Terje Vold, businessperson (born 1945).

=== August ===
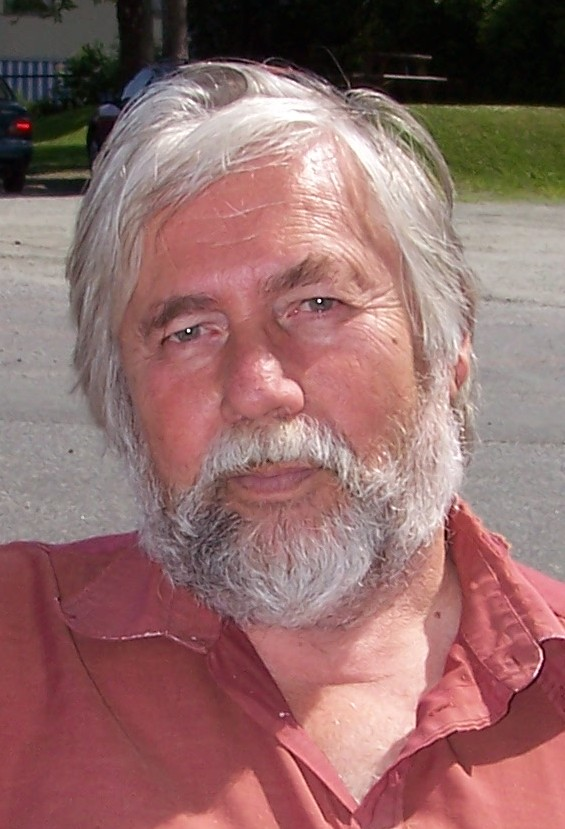
Tor Åge Bringsværd

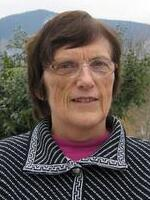
Idun Reiten

- 4 August – Tor Åge Bringsværd, novelist (born 1939).
- 4 August – Arnfinn Hofstad, businessperson (born 1934).
- 9 August – Bjørn Kjellemyr, jazz bassist (born 1950).
- 19 August – Idun Reiten, mathematician (born 1942).
- 21 August – Jan Erik Berntsen, actor and singer (born 1944).
- 23 August – Merete Moen, actress (born 1945).

=== September ===
- 8 September – Eli Årdal Berland, politician (born 1952).
- 12 September – Magne Sæbø, theologist (born 1929]).
- 20 September – Ivar Bøksle, singer and composer (born 1947).
- 20 September – Egil Gade Greve, banker (born 1930).
- 28 September – Olav Marås, politician (born 1931).

=== October ===
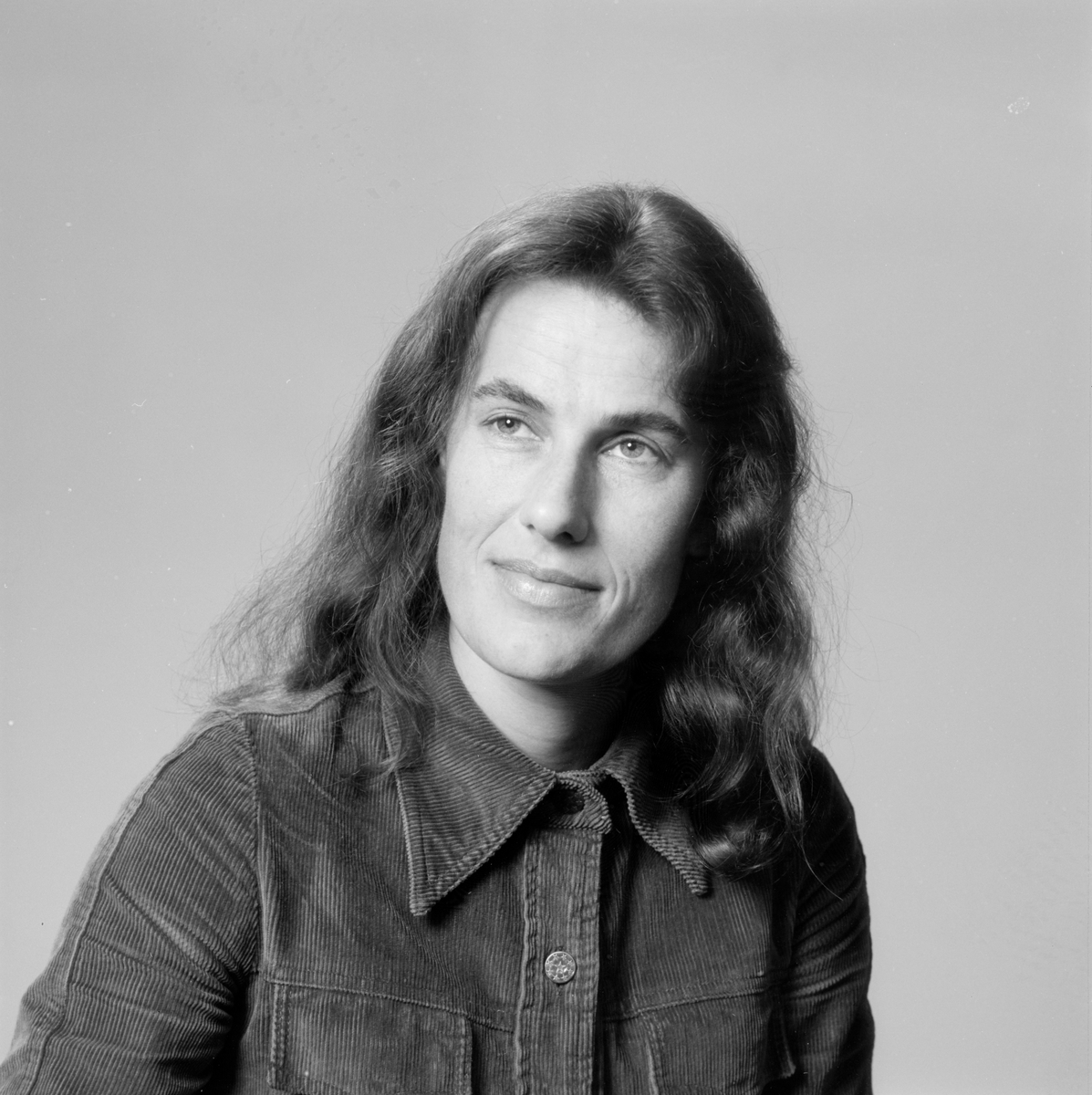
Liv Køltzow

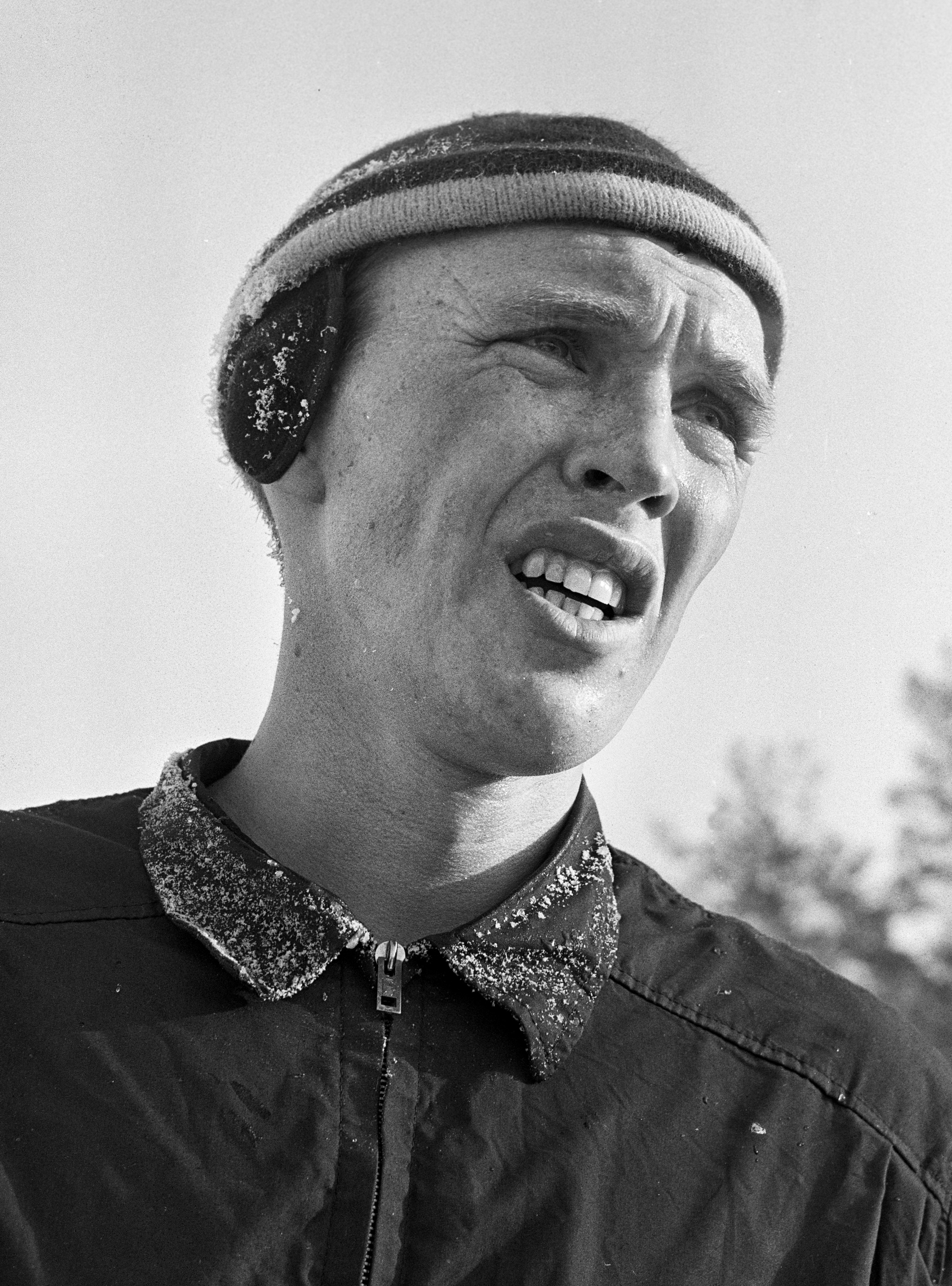
Odd Martinsen

- 9 October – Ola Wærhaug, biathlete (born 1937).
- 12 October – Liv Køltzow, writer (born 1945).
- 17 October – Vidar Lønn-Arnesen, radio and television presenter (born 1940).
- 18 October – Roy Jacobsen, writer (born 1954).
- 24 October – Ingar Knudtsen, writer (born 1944).
- 27 October – Odd Martinsen, cross-country skier (born 1942).
- 30 October – Jorunn Kjellsby, actress (born 1944).

=== November ===
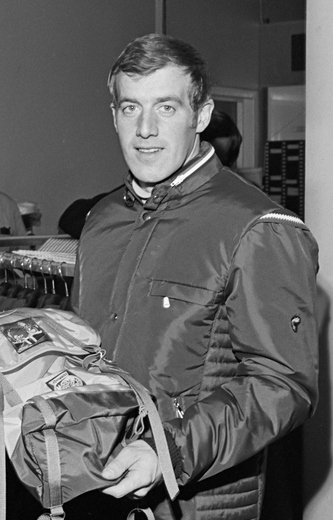
Magne Myrmo

- 1 November – Laila Øygarden, politician (born 1947).
- 4 November – Knut Kjeldstadli, historian (born 1948).
- 10 November – Eystein Husebye, seismologist (born 1937).
- 12 November – Asbjørn Rødseth, economist (born 1951).
- 15 November – Kari Buen, sculptor (born 1938).
- 15 November – Kjell Kaspersen, footballer (born 1939).
- 15 November – Inger Teien, actress (born 1937).
- 18 November – Per Tresselt, diplomat and judge (born 1937).
- 19 November – Magne Myrmo, cross-country skier (born 1943).
- 23 November – Trygve Moe, journalist (born 1927).
- 28 November – Natascha Heintz, paleontologist (born 1930).
- 30 November – Dag Spantell, singer (born 1950).
- 30 November – Hege Newth, writer (born 1966)

=== December ===
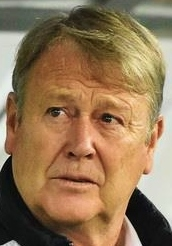
Åge Hareide

- 2 December – Arnfinn Nesset, serial killer (born 1936).
- 5 December – Anne Husebekk, physician and rector (born 1955).
- 12 December – Laila Bokhari, political scientist and politician (born 1974).
- 18 December – Åge Hareide, footballer (born 1953).
- 19 December – Arthur Arntzen, journalist, humorist, actor and writer (born 1937).
- 19 December – Harald Grytten, philologist and historian (born 1938).
- 23 December – Sivert Guttorm Bakken, biathlete (born 1998).

=== Full date missing ===
- Grete Randsborg Jenseg children's writer (born 1937).
