= Fiona Templeton =

American poet

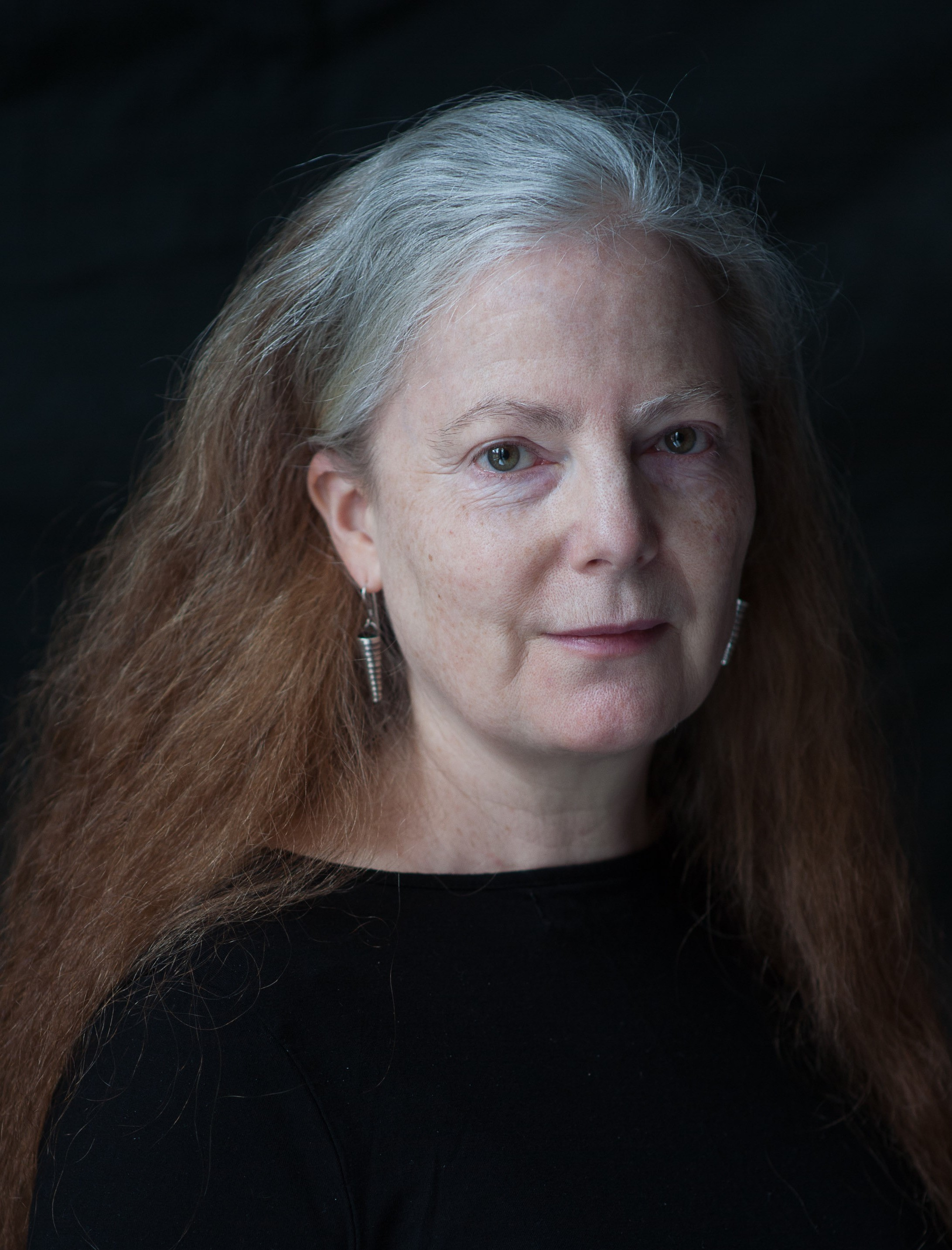
Fiona Templeton 2013 by Hugo Glendinning

Fiona Templeton is an experimental director, playwright, poet and performer. Born in Scotland in 1951, she co-founded London's Theatre of Mistakes in the 1970s and lived for many years in the East Village of Manhattan. Her performance work includes the pioneering urban theatrical journey, You-The City. She has received the Foundation for Contemporary Arts Grants to Artists award (2002); and fellowships from the National Endowment for the Arts, New York Foundation for the Arts, the Asian Cultural Council, and a Senior Judith E. Wilson Fellowship at Cambridge. She is founder and Artistic Director of The Relationship. She is currently the Creative Fellow at the Woodberry Poetry Room of Harvard University.

== The Relationship ==
The Relationship, founded in 2000, is a performance art group and nonprofit based in both New York, New York and London. The Relationship is known for taking an innovative approach to language and for exploring the relationship between the audience and performers. The group is well known for its production of "The Medead", a monumental performance work most recently performed in collaboration with Samita Sinha at Roulette Brooklyn in New York.

The Relationship also directs the Leslie Scalapino Award for Innovative Women Playwrights, established in 2012 in memory of experimental poet and publisher Leslie Scalapino.

== Bibliography ==
- The Medead, New York: Roof Books, 2014 - play cycle
- Mum in Airdrie Glasgow: Object Permanence, 2005 - poems
- Delirium of Interpretations, Los Angeles: Green Integer, 2003 - play
- Cells of Release, New York: Roof Books, 1997 - poem and photographs from an installation
- oops the join, Cambridge: rempress, 1997 - poems
- YOU - The City, New York: Roof Books, 1990 - performance script with director's notes and photographs
- Hi Cowboy, London: Mainstream, 1991 - poems
- London, College Park: Sun & Moon Press, 1984 - poetry
- Elements of Performance Art, London: Ting Books, 1976 - theory and exercises (with Anthony Howell)

Her anthologies include Out of Everywhere, From the Other Side of the Century, and Sun & Moon.
