= Haddal (surname) =

Haddal is a surname. Notable people with the surname include:

- Per Haddal (born 1942), Norwegian film critic
