= Langen =

Langen may refer to:

== Places ==
Germany

- Langen, Cuxhaven, in the district of Cuxhaven, Lower Saxony
- Langen, Emsland, part of the Samtgemeinde Lengerich, in the Emsland district, Lower Saxony
- Langen, Fehrbellin, a village in the municipality of Fehrbellin, Brandenburg
- Langen, Hesse, in the district of Offenbach, Hesse
- Langen Brütz, a municipality in the district of Parchim, in Mecklenburg-Vorpommern
- Langen Jarchow, a municipality in the district of Parchim, in Mecklenburg-Vorpommern

Austria

- Langen am Arlberg, part of Klösterle, in Vorarlberg
- Langen bei Bregenz, in Vorarlberg

== Other uses ==
- Langen (surname)
