= Bjørnflaten =

Bjørnflaten is a Norwegian surname. Notable people with the surname include:

- Anne Marit Bjørnflaten (born 1969), Norwegian politician
- Nils Bjørnflaten (1942–2025), Norwegian politician
