= 1865 in Norway =

- Centuries: 17th; 18th; 19th; 20th; 21st
- Decades: 1840s; 1850s; 1860s; 1870s; 1880s
- See also: 1865 in Sweden; List of years in Norway

Events in the year 1865 in Norway.

== Incumbents ==
- Monarch: Charles IV.
- First Minister: Frederik Stang

== Events ==
- 22 September – Frederik Stang founds the Norwegian Red Cross

== Births ==
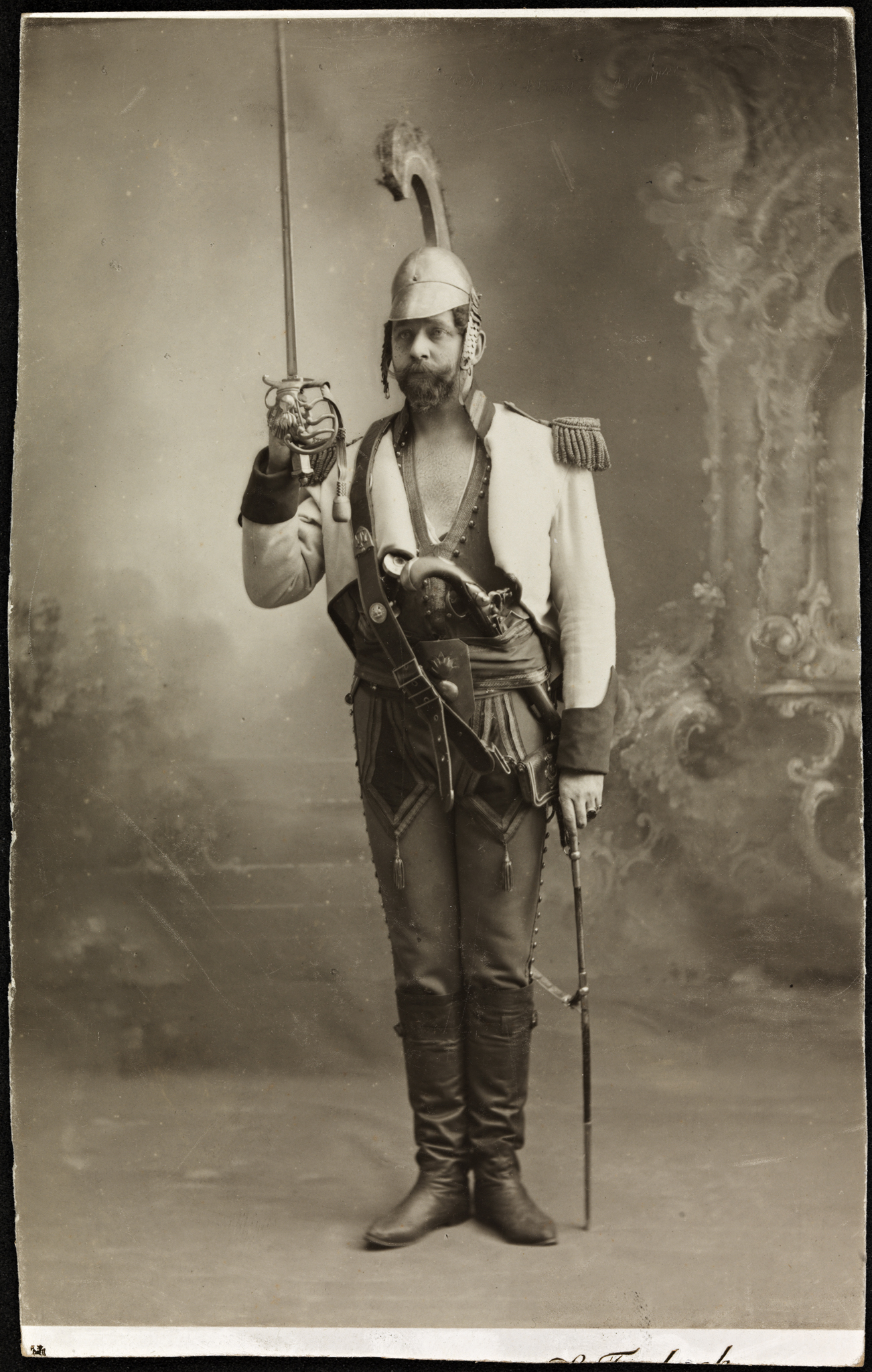
Ludvig Bergh

- 8 January – Ivar Flem, newspaper editor (died 1948).
- 9 January – Ludvig Bergh, actor, theatre director (died 1924).
- 15 January – Finn Blakstad, farmer and politician (died 1941)
- 6 February – William Martin Nygaard, publisher and politician (died 1952)
- 12 June – Anders Beer Wilse, photographer (died 1949)
- 15 September – Knut Gjerset, Norwegian-American professor, author and historian (died 1936)
- 8 October – Adolph Gundersen, Norwegian-American medical doctor, founder of Gundersen Lutheran Medical Center (died 1938)
- 22 October – Borghild Holmsen, pianist, composer and music critic (died 1938).
- 2 November – Paul Olaf Bodding, missionary, linguist and folklorist (died 1938)
- 30 November – Rolf Jacobsen, jurist, politician and Minister (died 1942)

=== Full date unknown ===
- Haakon Martin Evjenth, politician (died 1934)
- Lars Jorde, painter (died 1939)
- Ole Monsen Mjelde, politician and Minister (died 1942)
- Martin Ulvestad, historian and author (died 1942)

== Deaths ==
- 11 June – Nils Fredrik Julius Aars, priest and politician (born 1807)
- 10 July – Ulrik Anton Motzfeldt, jurist and politician (born 1807)

=== Full date unknown ===
- Hans Glad Bloch, politician (born 1791)
