= Signe Howell =

Norwegian social anthropologist (1942–2025)

Signe Lise Howell
- Born: Signe Lise Lie; 15 July 1942; Tinn Municipality, Norway
- Died: 26 January 2025 (aged 82); Oslo, Norway
- Occupation: Social anthropologist
- Spouse: Anthony Howell

Signe Lise Howell (15 July 1942 – 26 January 2025) was a Norwegian social anthropologist.

== Background ==
Howell was born in Tinn Municipality to physician Finn Oddvar Lie and Lise Thomassen. She was married to performance artist Anthony Howell from 1970 to 1977, and to Desmond James McNeill from 1986.

Howell died in Oslo on 26 January 2025, at the age of 82.

== Career ==
Howell was a co-founder of the London-based experimental street theatre The Theatre of Mistakes in the 1960s.

She studied history at the University of London School of Oriental and African Studies and social anthropology at the Oxford University. She investigated social structures in South-East Asia, and made field studies among the Chewong people in Malaya and Lio people in Flores in Indonesia. She was appointed professor at the University of Oslo from 1989. Among her works are Chewong Myths and Legends from 1982, and Society and Cosmos. Chewong of Peninsular Malaysia from 1984. She co-edited Blod – tykkere enn vann? Betydninger av slektskap i Norge (2001). She was a member of the Norwegian Academy of Science and Letters.
