= Langen (surname) =

Langen, van Langen or von Langen is a surname. Notable people with the surname include:

- Birgit Collin-Langen (born 1956), German politician
- Carl Freiherr von Langen (1887–1934), German equestrian who competed in the 1928 Summer Olympics
- Christoph Langen (born 1962), German bobsledder
- Dexter Langen (born 1980), German footballer
- Dirk Reinhard Adelbert van Langen (1898–1983), a member of the Chief of Staff of the Royal Netherlands East Indies Army
- Ellen van Langen (born 1966), Dutch athlete
- Eugen Langen (1833–1895), German entrepreneur, engineer and inventor, involved in the development of the petrol engine and the Wuppertal monorail
- Ivar Langen (born 1942), rector at the University of Stavanger in Norway
- Joseph Langen (1837–1901), German theologian
- Odin Elsford Stanley Langen (1913–1976), U.S. Representative from Minnesota
- Philipp Langen (born 1986), German footballer
- Rudolph von Langen (1438 or 1439–1519), German Catholic divine, who helped introduced Humanistic ideas to the town of Munster
- Werner Langen (born 1949), German politician and Member of the European Parliament
