= Jan Fredrik Christiansen =

Jan Fredrik Christiansen (born 1 April 1942) was principal trumpeter with the Oslo Philharmonic Orchestra from 1973 until 2007.

== Career ==
Christiansen is also professor at the Norwegian Academy of Music and principal trumpet of the Oslo Sinfonietta. He joined the Philharmonic in 1966 and became principal in 1973, replacing Harry Kvebæk, and has performed in all of the orchestra's recordings since that time. He was a student of Harry Kvebæk, William Overton and Adolph Herseth. In 1985 he premiered Olav Anton Thommessen's trumpet concerto The Second Creation.
