= Kirsten Reitan =

Norwegian politician (born 1942)

Kirsten Reitan (born 29 September 1942) is a Norwegian politician for the Socialist Left Party.

She served as a deputy representative to the Norwegian Parliament from Sør-Trøndelag during the term 1993–1997. In total she met during 4 days of parliamentary session.
