= Peder Widding =

Norwegian politician

Peder Widding (21 January 1931 – 19 March 2025) was a Norwegian agricultural leader and politician for the Centre Party.

He grew up in Tromsøysund, but took up residence in Trondheim. He worked in the Regional Development Fund and the Norges Pelsdyralslag. In 1972 he was hired as a head of department in the Norwegian State Agriculture Bank, and from 1980 to 1997 he was the director of agriculture in Sør-Trøndelag County Municipality.

Widding was elected as a deputy representative to the Parliament of Norway from Sør-Trøndelag during the term 1977–1981. In total he was present during 62 days of parliamentary session.
