= Reidar Goa =

Norwegian footballer (1942–2018)

Personal information
- Date of birth: 8 April 1942
- Place of birth: Norway
- Date of death: 8 September 2018 (aged 76)
- Position: Defender

Senior career*
Years	Team	Apps	(Gls)
	Randaberg IL	180	
1966–1977	Viking	404	

International career
1959	Norway U19	1	(0)
1964	Norway U21	3	(0)
1965	Norway B	2	(0)
1970–1975	Norway	4	(0)
- * Club domestic league appearances and goals

Reidar Goa (8 April 1942 – 8 September 2018) was a Norwegian footballer who played as a defender.

He first played for Randaberg IL. He then played for Viking FK (from 1966 to 1977), with 404 matches for the first team. He played four matches for the Norway national team, between 1970 and 1975. With Viking he won the Norwegian football league four times, in 1972, 1973, 1974, and 1975.
