= Ragnar Pedersen =

Norwegian screenwriter, illustrator and cartoonist (1942–2007)

- Born: 25 September 1942; Oslo, Norway
- Died: 16 October 2007 (aged 65); Fredrikstad
- Occupations: illustrator, cartoonist, comics writer, script writer, magazine editor

Ragnar Pedersen (25 September 1942 – 16 October 2007) was a Norwegian illustrator, known by his pen name "Joker", text writer, magazine editor and revue writer. He was from Oslo, and settled in Fredrikstad from 1972.

He was a cartoonist for the newspaper Dagbladet for many years, in the column "Uka som gikk". He wrote and illustrated the comics strip Amøbene for the weekly magazine Alle Menn from 1966 onwards. He edited the humour magazine KOnK from 1966 to 1976.

A posthumous exhibition of his works was held in Oslo at Deichmanske bibliotek, Grünerløkka, in 2014.
