= Irma Moen Eriksen =

Norwegian politician (1934–2025)

Irma Moen Eriksen, née Karlsen (24 July 1934 – 1 May 2025) was a Norwegian politician for the Conservative Party.

She was born in Asker. She was an office clerk in Oslo before staying at home for 12 years, then working as an office clerk for Kværner Brug in Sandvika between 1968 and 1974. She married Jan Martin Eriksen in 1955.

In 1976 she was hired as a secretary in Standard Telefon og Kabelfabrik, staying in the company until 1999, at which time the company was named Alcatel. She settled in Halden where she sat on the city council (being a deputy on the executive committee) from 1979 to 1983. She was elected as a deputy representative to the Parliament of Norway from Østfold for the term 1981–1985. In total she met during 191 days of parliamentary session. Later, she was elected to Østfold county council for the term 1987–1991.

Eriksen chaired Halden Conservative Party from 1992 to 1993, and held numerous board memberships in her party locally and regionally. She also sat on several regional boards working with social and cultural affairs, including a period as board member of Galleri F 15. She also chaired the Halden branch of Norges Forsvarsforening from 1986 to 1988. Eriksen was also a secretary and chair of Halden Women's Council (1977–78 and 1982–83 respectively), and served as deputy chair of the Norwegian National Women's Council from 1983 to 1985.
