= Johan Lind =

Norwegian speed skater

Personal information
- Nationality: Norwegian
- Born: 9 January 1942 (age 83); Mosjøen

Sport
- Sport: Speed skating
- Club: Hamar IL

Johan Lind (born 9 January 1942) is a Norwegian speed skater. He was born in Mosjøen and represented the club Hamar IL. He competed in the 500 m at the 1968 Winter Olympics in Grenoble, and at the 1972 Winter Olympics in Sapporo.
