= Einar Johansen (politician) =

Norwegian politician

Einar Rudolf Johansen (4 December 1941 – 16 June 2025) was a Norwegian fisherman and politician for the Labour Party.

== Career ==
The son of a fisherman, Johansen spent his life at sea after finishing eight years of school. He was a board member of the Finnmark branch of Norges Fiskarlag from 1979 to 1996, the last five years as leader. He also became a member of the national board in 1992, and deputy leader from 1998 to 2001.

Johansen was selected for the school board in Nesseby in 1972–1975, and chaired the Labour Party branch in Nesseby from 1973 to 1975. He was then elected mayor, serving until 1983 and continuing in the municipal council until 1993. He was elected to Finnmark county council five times, serving from 1979 to 2003. He was deputy chair of Finnmark Labour Party during two terms, 1980–1985 and 2000–2002.

He served as a deputy representative to the Parliament of Norway from Finnmark during the terms 1989–1993, 1997–2001 and 2001–2005. Johansen most notably served as a full member of Parliament from 17 March 2000, when MP Karl Eirik Schjøtt-Pedersen became a member of Stoltenberg's First Cabinet, and lasting until the 2001 elections. Johansen sat on the Standing Committee on Local Government. In total he met during 1 year and 336 days of parliamentary session.

Johansen also sat on the Samerettsutvalget from 1980 to 1997, Samisk fiskeriutvalg from 1995 to 1996, the Norwegian–Russian Fisheries Commission from 1996 to 2001, and several county-wide boards and committees. He chaired the board of Ságat from 1983 to 2007 and Varanger Kraft from 1983 to 2003. He was named an honorary member of Norges Fiskarlag in 2007.
