= Sverre Asmervik =

Norwegian psychologist and writer

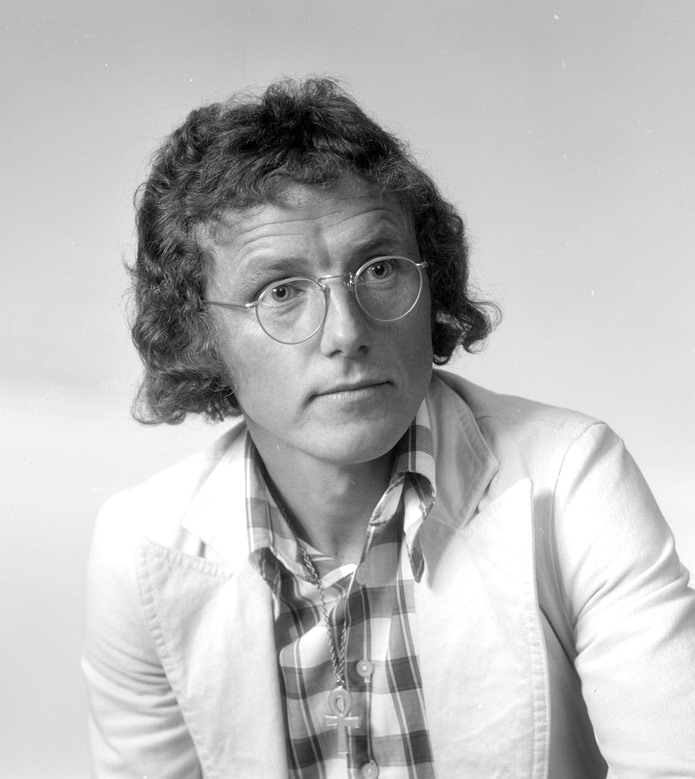
- Born: 23 July 1942 (age 84); Bergen, Norway
- Occupations: Psychologist; Novelist; Non-fiction writer
- Notable work: Bjarne på skjæret (1976); Men tankene mine får du aldri (1982)

Sverre Asmervik (born 23 July 1942) is a Norwegian psychologist, novelist, and non-fiction writer.

He was born in Bergen in Western Norway. Among his works are Ungdom og seksualitet (Youth and sexuality) from 1972, Eleven i dine hender (The student in your hands) from 1974, and the documentaries Bjarne på skjæret (1976), and Men tankene mine får du aldri (But my thoughts you will never get) from 1982, a report on prostitution in Oslo. His novels include Skilt (divorced) from 1976, Slagbjørnen (1978), Kamini from 1987, and Elskeren (The lover) from 1991.
