= Else Breen =

Norwegian children's writer (1927–2025)

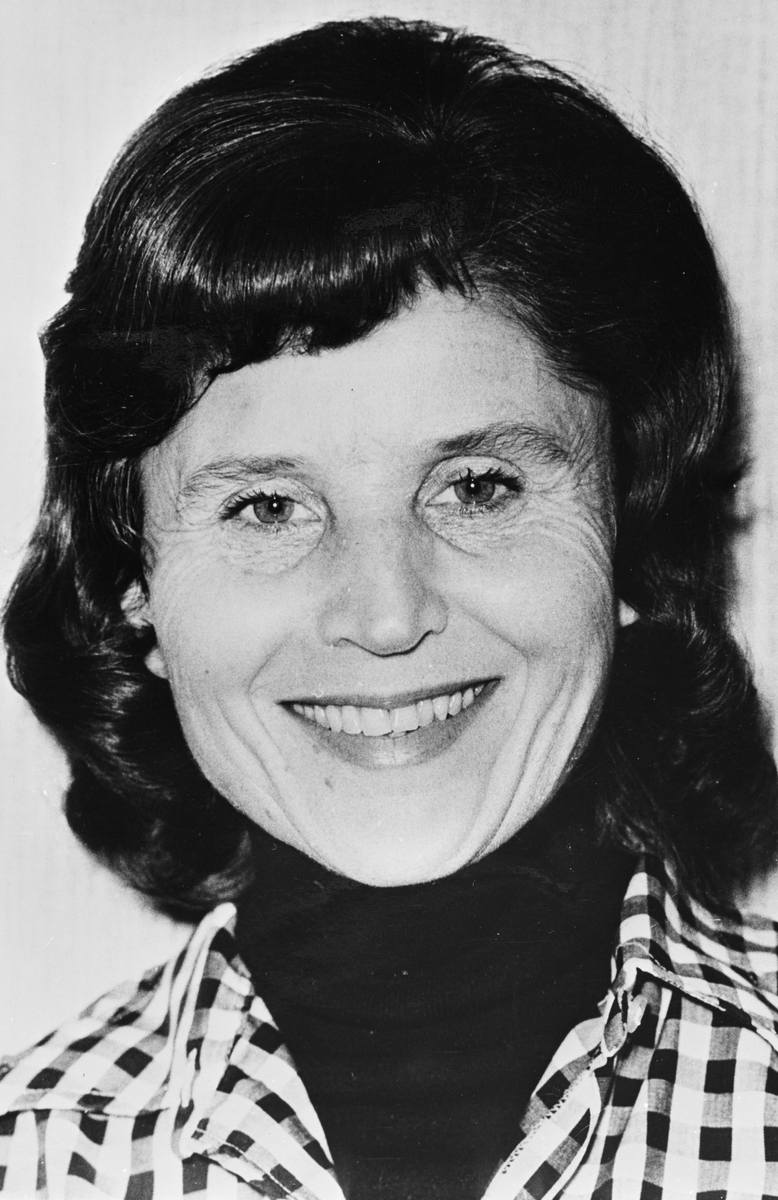
- Breen in 1978
- Born: 15 March 1927; Molde, Norway
- Died: 12 June 2025 (aged 98)
- Occupations: children's writer and novelist

Else Breen (15 March 1927 – 12 June 2025) was a Norwegian children's writer, novelist and literary scientist.

== Life and career ==
Breen was born in Molde on 15 March 1927. She made her literary breakthrough in 1970 with the children's book Mias kråke, about the teenage girl Mia and her family. In the sequel I stripete genser (1975), Mia is a couple of years older. The short story collection Stopp karusellen (1978) treats subjects such as rootlessness and the feeling of being different.

Among her further books for children are Hva skal vi gjøre med Oberon? from 1981, Min mors paraply from 1983 and Sommeren i fjor from 1992.

Her books for adults include the novels Hundreårshuset from 1987 and Nattfrekvens from 1994. She wrote a book on children's literature and a biographical book on Jens Zetlitz.

Breen died on 12 June 2025, at the age of 98.
