= Anne Aaserud =

Norwegian art historian and museum director

- Born: 23 July 1942
- Died: 14 February 2017 (aged 74)
- Education: University of Oslo
- Occupations: Art historian Museum director
- Awards: Order of St. Olav

Anne Aaserud (23 July 1942 – 14 February 2017) was a Norwegian art historian and museum director.

== Biography ==
Anne Britt Aaserud studies art history at the University of Oslo and graduated mag.art. in 1993. She was assigned with the National Gallery of Norway from 1984 to 1994. From 1994 to 2008 she was director of the Northern Norway Art Museum in Tromsø. She was decorated Knight, First Class of the Order of St. Olav in 2008, for her contributions to cultural life in Northern Norway.

== Selected works ==
- Adelsteen Normann Fra Bodø til Berlin (Stamsund: Orkana akademisk. 2013) ISBN 9788281042278
- Fra Paris til Svolvær : kunstnere i Lofoten i mellomkrigstigen (Tromsø : Nordnorsk Kunstmuseum, 2006) with Knut Ljøgodt
- Nordnorske bilder og bildet av Nord-Norge (Tromsø : Nordnorsk Kunstmuseum. 2002)
