= Finn Fuglestad =

Norwegian historian (born 1942)

Finn Fuglestad (born 22 August 1942 in Stavanger) is a Norwegian historian.

He became an associate professor (førsteamanuensis) at the University of Oslo in 1984, and moved up the ranks to become professor in 1991.

== Selected bibliography ==
- A history of Niger 1850-1960, 1983.
- Norwegian Missions in African History. Vol.2 Madagascar, 1986.
- Spansk historie : et riss, Åsmund Egge and Finn Fuglestad (ed.), 1990.
- En ny verden: Omkring Columbus, with Jens Erland Braarvig, 1993.
- Latin-Amerika og Karibiens historie, 1994.
- Fra Svartedauden til Wiener-kongressen. Den vesterlandske kulturkretsens historie 1347-1815 i et globalt-sammenliknende perspektiv, 1999.
- Spanias og Portugals historie. En oversikt, 2004.
- The Ambiguities of History: The problem of Ethnocentrism in Historical Writings, 2005.
