= Alf Bakke =

Norwegian entomologist (1927–2025)

- Born: December 13, 1927; Arendal, Norway
- Died: February 21, 2025 (aged 97)
- Occupations: Entomologist, forest researcher

Alf Bakke (December 13, 1927 – February 21, 2025) was a Norwegian forest researcher. He received his doctorate in entomology in 1968.

Bakke worked as a forest research manager, and then in 1958 he was employed by the Norwegian Forest and Landscape Institute as a research manager. In 1980 he became a professor at the Norwegian College of Agriculture. Bakke was involved in developing the bark beetle trap in the 1970s, which is based on the use of a pheromone to attract European spruce bark beetles. The purpose was to reduce the extensive bark beetle attacks on spruce forests.

Bakke wrote several books and many articles in his subject area. His research articles were published in a variety of journals.

He resided in Ås Municipality in Akershus county.

== Books ==
- 1961: Skogsinsekter: Skadeinsekter på skogen i Norge (Forest Insects: Insect Pests in Norwegian Forests; Oslo: Aschehoug forlag, 166 pp.)
- 1965: Skadedyr i skogen (Forest Pests; Oslo: Fabritius, 87 pp.)
- 1965 (1974): Skadedyr i skogen (Forest Pests; Oslo: Landbruksforlaget, 132 pp., ISBN 82-529-0097-6)
- 1975: Dagsommerfugler (Butterflies; Oslo: Cappelen, ISBN 82-02-03157-5)
- 1976: Skadedyr i hus og hytte (House and Cottage Pests; Oslo: NKS forlaget, 224 pp.)
- 1994: Insekter på skogtrær (Insects on Forest Trees; Oslo: Landbruksforlaget, 119 pp., ISBN 82-529-1650-3)
