= Ingrid Piltingsrud =

Norwegian politician (born 1942)

Ingrid Piltingsrud (born 6 June 1942) is a Norwegian politician for the Conservative Party.

She served as a deputy representative to the Norwegian Parliament from Oppland during the term 1981–1985. In total she met during 94 days of parliamentary session.
