= Alv Egeland =

Norwegian physicist (1932–2025)

Alv Egeland (22 March 1932 – 3 May 2025) was a Norwegian physicist.

== Life and career ==
Egeland was born in Kvinesdal Municipality on 22 March 1932. He took the cand.real. degree in 1959, and his doctorate at Stockholm University in 1963. He was a professor at the University of Oslo from 1972. His fields are space research and aurora borealis research. He was a member of the Norwegian Academy of Science and Letters.

Egeland died on 3 May 2025, at the age of 93.
