= Rodney Riise =

Norwegian ice hockey player

Rodney Olav Riise (21 December 1942 – 31 December 2009) was a Norwegian ice hockey player. He was born in Oslo, Norway and represented the club Vålerengens IF. He played for the Norwegian national ice hockey team, and participated at the Winter Olympics in Grenoble in 1968, where the Norwegian team placed 11th.
