= Jan Engsmyr =

Norwegian politician (1944–2025)

Jan Olaf Engsmyr
- Engsmyr in mayoral dress
- Born: 23 December 1944
- Died: 6 July 2025 (aged 80)

Jan Olaf Engsmyr (23 December 1944 – 6 July 2025) was a Norwegian local politician who was mayor of Sarpsborg Municipality for 16 years.

== Life and career ==
Engsmyr was born on 23 December 1944 and entered politics as a municipal council representative in Tune in 1975. During this period, he was a group leader of the Labour Party. He was the Mayor of Sapsborg from 1995 to 13 October 2011.

Engsmyr died on 6 July 2025, at the age of 80.
