= Harry W. Kvebæk =

Norwegian trumpet player

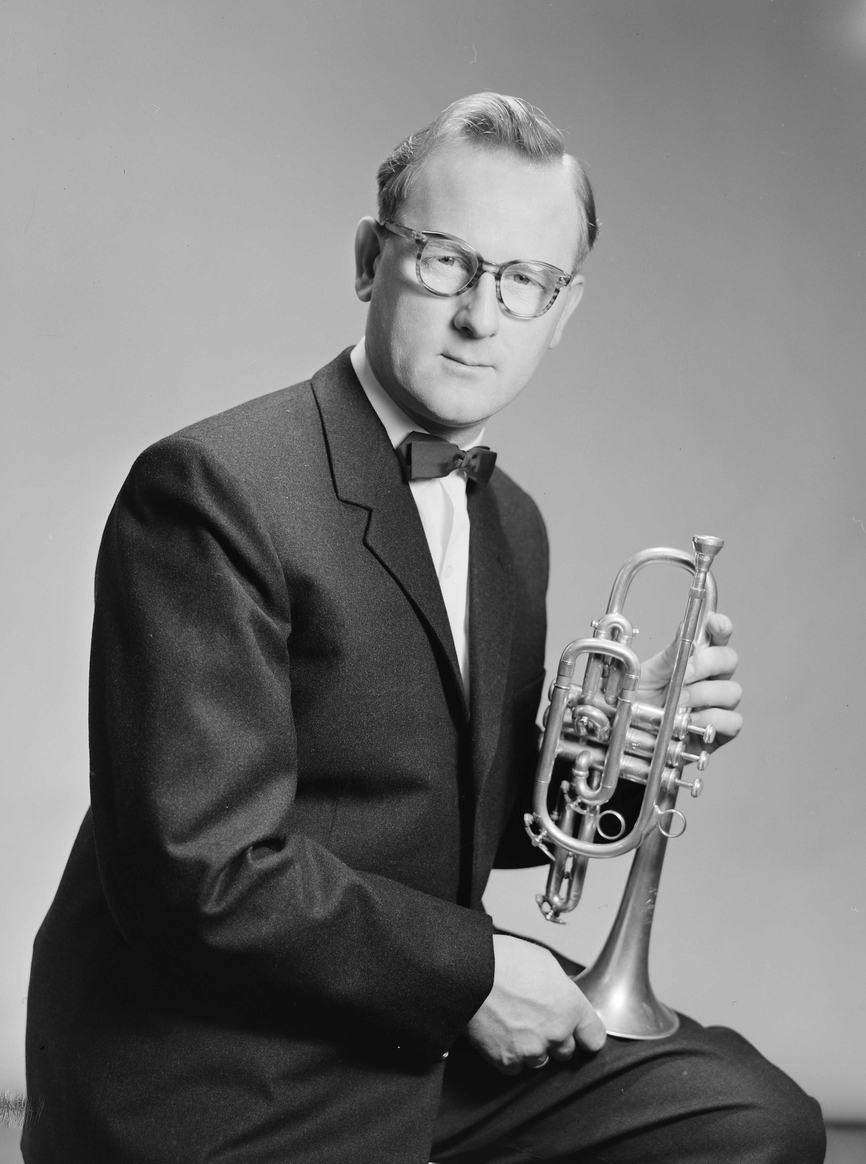
Harry William Kvebæk, 1960.

Harry William Kvebæk (4 May 1925 – 26 June 2012) was a Norwegian trumpeter.

He was born in Fetsund. He was a solo cornettist in Forsvarets Stabsmusikkorps from 1947 to 1963 and solo trumpetist in the Oslo Philharmonic from 1963 to 1973. He was then appointed as an associate professor in trumpet and chamber music at the Norwegian Academy of Music, and was later promoted to professor. He was decorated with the King's Medal of Merit in gold, and won the veteran's Gammleng Award in 1998.
