= Erling Walderhaug =

Norwegian politician (born 1942)

Erling Walderhaug (born 24 November 1942) is a Norwegian politician for the Conservative Party.

He served as a deputy representative to the Norwegian Parliament from Hordaland during the term 1989–1993. He met during 13 days of parliamentary session. On the local level he was the mayor of Fedje Municipality until 2007.
