= Anthony Howell (performance artist) =

Anthony Howell (born 1945) is an English poet, novelist and performance artist. He was a founder of the performance company The Theatre of Mistakes, in the 1970s and 1980s.

== Life and career ==
Howell was born in 1945. By 1966 he was dancing with the Royal Ballet, but left the ballet in order to concentrate on writing, and his first collection of poems, Inside the Castle, was published by the Cresset Press in 1969. At that time (1968–69), he was teaching creative writing to students at the American Institute for Foreign Study at their University of Grenoble campus.

In 1970 he directed The Oz Event at the Institute of Contemporary Arts (ICA) and read his poems at the Poetry Society. His choric song "Essora Tessorio" was performed at the Whitechapel Gallery in 1973, and, in the same year, he was invited to join the International Writers' programme at the University of Iowa.

He founded performance company The Theatre of Mistakes in 1974. Under his direction, this company made notable appearances at The Cambridge Poetry Festival (1975), at the Serpentine Gallery, London, and at the Stedelijk Museum Amsterdam (1976), at the Hayward Gallery, at the Biennale de Paris, in the Musée d'Art Moderne and at FIAC in the Grand Palais (1977). Between 1978 and 1981 there were further performances in Vancouver, Berlin, Rotterdam, Belgrade, Brussels, Innsbruck, Brescia and Ferrara as well as at the Paula Cooper Gallery in New York, at the Theatre for the New City (NY), at University of Pittsburgh and at Pittsburgh State Penitentiary. During these years he was also employed as a lecturer at Maidstone, Goldsmiths, Central and Middlesex colleges of Art.

His solo performances, The Table Moves, were then shown at the Sydney Biennale in 1982, with further workshop performances in Hobart, Melbourne, Newcastle and elsewhere, and Active Circles was performed on Lake Goongarrie in Western Australia. He then taught in the sculpture department of Sydney College of the Arts, followed by a residency at the same college and a performance, The Tower, at the Art Gallery of New South Wales in 1984. A film was made of this performance, directed by James Bogle. In 1985 he performed at the Tate Gallery, in the British Art Show, and Birmingham Art Gallery, a performance described by comedian Stewart Lee in The Guardian as "the best performance I've ever seen".

During these years, his literary output included Imruil (a free translation from pre-Islamic Arabic (Barrie & Jenkins, 1970), Erotic Lyrics (edited for Studio Vista in 1970), Oslo: A Tantric Ode (published by Calder & Boyars in 1975), and Notions of a Mirror (poems, published by Anvil in 1983). Then came a novel, In the Company of Others (published by Marion Boyars in 1986), and Why I May Never See the Walls of China (poems, Anvil, 1986). He has also written a book on performance with Fiona Templeton, Elements of Performance Art (Ting Books, 1977). His poems have appeared in numerous anthologies. More recent publications include Howell's Law (poems, Anvil, 1990) and First Time in Japan (poems, Anvil, 1995).

Howell was Senior Lecturer in Time Based Studies at the Faculty of Art, Design and Technology, University of Wales Institute, Cardiff, and the editor of Grey Suit: Video for Art & Literature – a magazine distributed on VHS videotape, published quarterly and distributed worldwide. He was also organiser of Cardiff Art in Time, a performance art/video festival, featuring student and professional work from around the world.

Howell has received numerous bursaries and awards for performance and for writing, including a £5000 writer's bursary from the Arts Council of Wales. In 1989 he was invited by the South Bank Centre to act as a consultant concerning the future programming of the Purcell Room. Recently [needs updating] he has performed at the Sheffield Media Show, and at Chapter Arts Centre, Cardiff, and read his poems at the Hay on Wye Festival (1990) and at Sub-Voicive in London. He has also organised numerous poetry readings in Cardiff - by John Ashbery, F. T. Prince, Hugo Williams, Michael Donaghy, Kazuko Shiraishi and others. He has also directed several video films - including The Ballad of the Sands, a video poem. His articles and reviews have appeared in many publications. Recently [needs updating] he was shortlisted for a Paul Hamlyn Award.

He has given many lectures on his own performance work, often accompanied by videos of his work. He also lectured on Immoralism during the Post-Morality Show at Kettles Yard, Cambridge, in 1990, and on "The Analysis of Performance Art" for the Ruskin School of Art in Oxford (1994). He has given further lectures recently at the ICA and at many colleges of Art, including Goldsmiths, Dartington, the Royal College, and the Central School of Speech and Drama. In 1995 he performed a new piece, Objects, during Cardiff Art in Time, and performed his Commentary on Klein during the Yves Klein exhibition at the Hayward Gallery.

In 1997, Howell toured Serbia, Macedonia and Montenegro for the British Council, creating new performances in Belgrade and Skopje, and The World Turned Upside Down was shown at Hollywood Leather, London. In 1998 he read his poems at The Old Operating Theatre and at the ICA and lectured on "Looking at Light" for the National Gallery of Wales. He created a performance with a pig in Belfast for Fix 98, and a performance with two horses for the 2nd International Festival of Experimental Art and Performance in Saint Petersburg.

The Analysis of Performance Art was published by Harwood Academic Press (now Routledge) in 1999 and his Selected Poems came out in 2000 from Anvil, well as his journal of time spent in Serbia, entitled Serbian Sturgeon (Harwood, now Routledge). He recently directed The Infernal Triangle at the ICA, London. He is currently working on [needs updating] a book of essays, entitled Immoralism: Art and Its Dark Side. Recently [updating] he showed The World Turned Upside Down in The Carnivalesque, a national touring exhibition, in Brighton. He performed at Hoxton Hall in June in First Class Evening Entertainments for the English National Opera (ENO) and revived A Waterfall by The Theatre of Mistakes for Gallery 291 in November 2000. He has recently [updating] finished choreographing a film (directed by Jayne Parker). The World Turned Upside Down. for BBC 2′s Dance on Camera.

In the 2000s Howell toured Tango Art - a fusion of the tango and performance art - shown at the SKC Belgrade, in Montenegro and at the Irish Centre, London. His books of poems included Dancers in Daylight (Anvil, 2003). He started Tottenham Arts and Dance centre The Room. From 2005-7 he curated "Poetry@TheRoom", an Arts Council-funded series, with poet Richard Tyrone Jones. Among others it featured Peter Porter, Fleur Adcock, John Hegley, Hugo Williams, Annie Freud, Roddy Lumsden, Zena Edwards, Tim Key, David J, Alan Jenkins and Clark Coolidge at a US abstract special. Poetry@TheRoom is scheduled to recommence in 2014 [updating]
