= Olav Sønderland =

Norwegian police officer

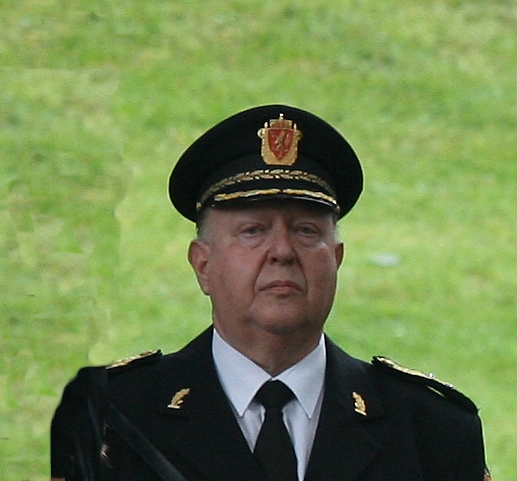
- Born: 18 November 1942; Bodø, Norway
- Died: 18 November 2023 (aged 81); Stavanger
- Education: University of Oslo
- Occupation: Police chief
- Awards: Norwegian Police Cross of Honour (2007); Order of St. Olav (2008)

Olav Sønderland (18 November 1942 – 18 November 2023) was a Norwegian jurist and police chief.

== Personal life and education ==
Born in Bodø Municipality on 18 November 1942, Sønderland graduated in jurisprudence from the University of Oslo in 1968.

He was a freemason.

== Career ==
Sønderland worked as police officer in Sandefjord Municipality from 1970 to 1978. He served as police chief in Sør-Varanger Municipality from 1978 to 1985, in Bodø from 1985 to 1992, in Stavanger Municipality from 1992, and Rogaland from 2002 to 2007.

He chaired a commission to evaluate the role of the police during the 2011 Norway attacks, which presented their findings in the Sønderland Report.

Sønderland died in Stavanger on 18 November 2023, aged 81.

== Awards ==
In 2007 Sønderland received the Norwegian Police Cross of Honour. He was decorated Knight, First Class of the Order of St. Olav in 2008.
