= Sigurd Erlend Reksnes =

Norwegian politician (born 1977)

Sigurd Erlend Reksnes (10 January 1977 – 31 January 2025) was a Norwegian politician for the Centre Party.

He was from Nordfjordeid. He was elected as a deputy representative to the Parliament of Norway from Sogn og Fjordane for the terms 2013–2017, 2017–2021 and 2021–2025. In total he met during 3 days of parliamentary session. He served in the county council of Sogn og Fjordane from 2015, later Vestland. He also entered the Centre Party's central board in 2021.

In 2023 he became mayor of Stad Municipality. However, his mayoral term was cut short as he suffered from cancer and died in his home on 31 January 2025. Earlier on the same day only 3 hours before his death he had been awarded the Centre Party honorary badge by Jenny Følling and Jon Askeland.
