= Richard Tyrone Jones =

British performance poet, writer and comedian

Richard Tyrone Jones (born 1980) is a British performance poet, writer and comedian. He is director of Utter! Spoken Word and director of spoken word at the Edinburgh Festival Free Fringe.

== Career ==
He attended King's College, Cambridge, where he studied history. While there he co-founded comedy group Fat Fat Pope.

After the group disbanded in 2001 he began performing poetry, with his first collection, Germline, published in 2009. His poems have also been published in Rising, Magma, The Delinquent and other magazines.

In February 2010 he staged his own funeral at the Whitechapel Art Gallery as a work of performance art. Unknown to him, he had actually developed dilated cardiomyopathy (heart failure) and a few weeks after the performance was admitted to hospital, where he nearly died. The experience provided the material for Jones's debut one-man show, Big Heart, which tries to raise awareness of his condition. With support from the Wellcome Trust, he toured the show extensively around the UK, and performed in Canada at the Victoria Fringe Festival and Vancouver Fringe Festival. Big Heart was later adapted into a three-part series that aired on BBC Radio 4 in July 2013.

The sequel to Big Heart, titled Crap Time Lord, further explored the complications of living with chronic heart failure, and won minor acclaim at the Edinburgh Fringe in 2014.

He has appeared, in various guises, at 400+ events including Latitude, Peterborough Festival and residencies at "Spoonful of Poison" (also frequent guest host). He has hosted and run workshops for Apples & Snakes. In 2008 he ran a month of slams for the Hackney Empire and was in Liz Bentley's Fringe show Edinburgh-by-sea. He won the fourth Poetry Idol contest at Shortfuse, and has hosted for them, the UK antifolk festivals and for Pete Doherty.

He retired in 2018.
