= Tor Kvarv =

Norwegian artist (1953–2025)

Tor Kvarv (6 February 1953 – 23 May 2025) was a Norwegian newspaper cartoonist and visual artist who worked with painting, drawing, and graphics.

== Life and career ==
Kvarv began as a newspaper illustrator for Nordlands Framtid in 1976. He contributed to Finansavisen, Drammens Tidende, Trønderbladet, Altaposten, and several other magazines. He began working with graphics, especially cold-point etching, in the 1980s. He had exhibitions throughout Norway and abroad, and has had artwork purchased by the National Gallery and the Norwegian Arts Council, including two ballpoint pen drawings in 1977, after an exhibition he participated in at the Oslo Kunstforening.

He was involved in the founding of Nordnorske Bildende Kunstnere (Visual Artists of Northern Norway) in 1971.

Kvarv died at his studio in Bodø, on 23 May 2025, at the age of 72.
