= The Theatre of Mistakes =

The Theatre of Mistakes was a performance art company in London, operating in the 1970s-1980s. It was founded by the English poet, novelist and performance artist, Anthony Howell. The group was known for its live performance art that was built around interactive games and workshops. The work was minimalist, structuralist, and conceptual.

== Background ==
The performance group was formed in the early 1970s in London. It emerged from a series of workshops, which were oriented towards games-based exercises. One of the earliest outcomes that shaped the direction of the Theater of Mistakes was a performance at Ascham Street in Kentish Town, which involved its residents as well as the environs of the location. The residents' furniture, for instance, was moved onto the streets for the exhibition. From then on, the group developed a form of structured performance art that included architecture, choreography, and poetry.

During the Summer of 1974, the Theatre of Mistakes hosted an arts festival at Purdies Farm. Most of the artists, writers and composers contributing to Wallpaper Magazine took part: Anthony McCall, Carolee Schneemann, Andrew Eden, Susan Bonvin, John Welch and many others. Performances included Amikam Toren's Ballet for Cars.

The concept of the performance often included several elements. For example, it might open with a "Free Session" and continue with performance workshops on weekdays. Each Friday and Saturday evenings, the group performed one of its works such as Going (1977), which involved a cast of five playing out mannerisms of departure in five choreographed acts.

While it received some attention in the United Kingdom, the Theater of Mistakes reached a higher level of acclaim abroad. One account stated that in Italy, a theatre manager doubled their fee due to the popularity of the performance.

== Selected performances ==
1976 Serpentine Gallery, London, 'Homage to Pietro Longhi'
Stedelijk Museum; Amsterdam. 'The Ascent of the Stedelijk'
1977 Hayward Gallery, London. 'A Waterfall' 48 performances for the Hayward Annual.
Biennale de Paris, Musee d'Art Moderne, Paris -'Going' FIAC, Grand Palais, Paris - ‘Going’.
1978 Student Cultural Centre, Belgrade -'Two Freedoms' and 'Going'
Arnolfini Gallery, Bristol -'Going', 'Waterfall 3'.
Paula Cooper Gallery, New York -'Waterfall 6' State Penitentiary and University, Pittsburgh, - 'Going'
Theatre for the New City, New York -'Going'
1979 Forum fur Actuelle Kunst, Innsbruck -'Orpheus and Hermes'
1980 Brighton Theatre Festival -'Orpheus and Hermes',
University Theatre Festival, Brescia, and Salle Polyvalente, Ferrara -
'Duet for Orpheus and Hermes' and 'Homage to Morandi'
Tour of Holland -'Homage to Morandi'
1981Jeanetta Cochrane Theatre, London - 'Homage to Morandi' 'Going'; 'Table Move 1'; and 'The Ninth Method'.
Tour of Belgium -'Homage to Morandi'. Kunstlerhaus Bethanien, Berlin -'Homage to Morandi' and 'Table Move 1'

== Selected reviews and essays ==
- Denis Thomas, The Listener, 27 April 1977
- Cordelia Oliver, The Guardian, 23 February 1977
- The Drama Review (Structure Theatre Issue) 1979
- Nick Wood, Artscribe no 10, 1979
- Stuart Morgan, Art Forum, Autumn 1980
- Anthony Masters, The Times, 19 March 1980
- John Roberts, Artscribe, no 28, 1981
- Sally Banes, The Village Voice, 7 December 1982
- Marie-Anne Mancio An A-Z of The Ting: Theatre of Mistakes
- Jason E Bowman with Anthony Howell Towards a Purposeful Accident: Elements of Performance Art via The Theatre of Mistakes
- Marie-Anne Mancio Mistakes Made Mutually: Researching The Theatre of Mistakes

== Performance texts by The Theatre of Mistakes ==
Homage to Morandi – Grey Suit Editions, 2006.
The book of the performance by The Theatre of Mistakes. ISBN 1-903006-01-5
Going – Grey Suit Editions 2007.
The book of the performance by The Theatre of Mistakes ISBN 1-903006-03-1
