= Ivar Langen =

Norwegian rector

Ivar Langen (born December 21, 1942) was the rector at the University of Stavanger from 2003 to 2007. He was a central figure in the campaign to gain university status for Stavanger University College, which was awarded in 2005.

Langen has been a professor of Mechanical Engineering since 1994. In 1997, he founded the Centre for Maintenance and Asset Management, and from 2000 to 2003, he was the vice dean of the School of Science and Technology at Stavanger University College. Langen also serves on the board of directors of the International Society of Offshore and Polar Engineers and was president of the organisation from 2002 to 2003.

He is a fellow of the Norwegian Academy of Technological Sciences.
