= Per Haddal =

Norwegian film critic (born 1942)

Per Haddal (born 9 January 1942) is a Norwegian film critic.

Born in Levanger, he has an M.A. in English. He started working for the newspaper Vårt Land, where he remained from 1969 to 1978. He also worked freelance for the Norwegian Broadcasting Corporation in the period 1975 to 1987. In 1978, he became the main film critic for the newspaper Aftenposten, where he has worked since. In 2008, he led the film critics' jury at the Berlin International Film Festival. Haddal has written books about the animator Ivo Caprino and the actress Liv Ullmann.
