= Nils Bjørnflaten =

Norwegian politician (1942–2025)

Nils Bjørnflaten (24 January 1942 – 11 May 2025) was a Norwegian politician.

Bjørnflaten served as a deputy representative to the Norwegian Parliament from Telemark during the terms 1985–1989, representing the Labour Party. In 2005, he again became deputy representative but later changed his party affiliation to the Progress Party. On 11 May 2025, Bjørnflaten died at the age of 83.

== Sources ==
- "Nils Bjørnflaten" (in Norwegian). Storting.
