= List of deputy members of the Storting =

This is an alphabetic list of deputy members of the Norwegian Storting.

== A ==
- John Aalmo (1902–1981), term/s: 1954–1957 and 1958–1961
- Tolv Aamland (1893–1983), term/s: 1945–1949
- Hallvard Aamlid (born 1973), term/s: 1997–2001
- Torhild Aarbergsbotten (born 1969), term/s: 2009–2013 and 2013–2017
- Hans Aardal (1921–1995), term/s: 1965–1969 and 1969–1973
- John-Ragnar Aarset (born 1973), term/s: 2001–2005 and 2005–2009
- Wilhelm Aarstad (1854–?)
- Olaf Aarvold (1899–1991), term/s: 1950–1953, 1954–1957, and 1958–1961
- Johan Aas (born 1960)
- Olav Aase (1914–1992), term/s: 1945–1949
- Elisabeth Aasen (1922–2009), term/s: 1973–1977
- Erling Aas-Eng (born 1965), term/s: 1993–1997
- Ann-Mari Aasland (1915–2008), term/s: 1973–1977
- Per Aasness (1875–1959)
- Rigmor Aasrud (born 1960), term/s: 1993–1997, 1997–2001 and 2001–2005
- Karima Abd-Daif (born 1965), term/s: 2005–2009
- Olaug Abrahamsen (1928–2010), term/s: 1977–1981
- Merete Agerbak-Jensen (born 1967), term/s: 1993–1997 and 1997–2001
- Knut Andreas Pettersen Agersborg (1765–1847), term/s: 1824–1826
- Svein Olav Agnalt (born 1949), term/s: 1977–1981
- Bernt Albert (born 1944), term/s: 1969–1973
- Ellen Alfsen (born 1965), term/s: 2001–2005 and 2005–2009
- Gabriel Ålgård (1952–2015), term/s: 1977–1981
- Athar Ali (born 1961), term/s: 1993–1997
- Kolbjørn Almlid (born 1945), term/s: 1989–1993
- Aud Alvær (1921–2000), term/s: 1969–1973
- Torkil Åmland (born 1966), term/s: 2009–2013
- Asle Amundsen (born 1952), term/s: 1985–1989
- Gry-Anette Rekanes Amundsen (born 1973)
- Randi Anda (1898–1999), term/s: 1954-57, 1958–61, 1961–65 and 1965-69
- Johannes Andenæs (1912–2003), term/s: 1958–1961
- Erik Andersen (born 1937), term/s: 1989–1993, 1993–1997 and 2001–2005
- Ingvald Anker Andersen (1866–1950), term/s: 1922–1924
- Rolf Andersen (1916–1990), term/s: 1969–1973
- Rolf Erling Andersen (1947–2021), term/s: 1997–2001 and 2001–2005
- Reidun Andersson (1922–1992), term/s: 1981–1985
- Peter Martin Anker (1801–1863)
- Åshild Anmarkrud (born 1939), term/s: 1997–2001
- Åsmund Apeland (1930–2010), term/s: 1969–1973
- Ola S. Apeland (born 1964), term/s: 1989–1993 and 1993–1997
- Johan Arndt (1876–1933), term/s: 1913–1915
- Stein Åros (1952–1996), term/s: 1981–1985, 1985–1989 and 1989–1993
- Eilif Åsbo (1905–1973)
- Nils Asheim (1895–1966), term/s: 1945–1949
- Olav Askvik (1915–2011), term/s: 1965–1969
- Jørgen Åsland (born 1946), term/s: 1993–1997
- Lars Aspeflaten (1924–2010), term/s: 1954–1957
- John Ole Aspli (born 1956), term/s: 2005–2009
- Steinar Aspli (born 1957), term/s: 1997–2001
- Åsmund Grøver Aukrust (born 1985)
- Eva Vinje Aurdal (born 1957)
- Olaf Aurdal (born 1939), term/s: 1989–1993
- Siri Austeng (1944–2017), term/s: 1985–1989

== B ==
- Eystein Bærug (1923–1998), term/s: 1973–1977
- Johnny Bakke (1908–1979), term/s: 1954–1957, 1958–1961, 1961–1965 and 1965–1969
- Alf Bakken (born 1962), term/s: 1989–1993
- Inger Marie Bakken (born 1951), term/s: 1981–1985
- Jon Bakken (born 1943), term/s: 1985–1989, 1989–1993 and 1993–1997
- Inga Balstad (born 1952), term/s: 1993–1997 and 1997–2001
- Leif Georg Ferdinand Bang (1881– ??), term/s: 1922–1924
- Inge Bartnes (born 1970), term/s: 1997–2001
- Une Aina Bastholm (born 1986), term/s: 2013–2017
- August Christian Baumann (1770–1831)
- Jens Tolv Beck (1890–1939)
- Astrid Bekkenes (born 1947), term/s: 2005–2009
- Målfrid Floan Belbo (born 1927), term/s: 1969–1973 and 1973–1977
- Vigdis Hjulstad Belbo (born 1955), term/s: 1993–1997 and 1997–2001
- Ivar Belck-Olsen (born 1932), term/s: 1977–1981, 1981–1985 and 1985–1989
- Bertha Bele (1893–1967), term/s: 1945-1949 and 1950-1953
- Gerd Benneche (1913–2003), term/s: 1958–1961
- Amund Nøkleby Bentzen (1903–1969), term/s: 1945–1949
- Jarle Benum (born 1928), term/s: 1965–1969, 1969–1973 and 1973–1977
- Gunnar Berg (died 2007), term/s: 1965–1969
- Klara Berg (1925–2011), term/s: 1981–1985 and 1985–1989
- Ronny Berg (born 1970), term/s: 2013–2017
- Anne Sofie Berge (born 1937), term/s: 1997–2001
- Frode Berge (born 1966), term/s: 1993–1997 and 2005–2009
- Hilde Bergebakken (born 1963), term/s: 1993–1997
- Gerd Olaug Berger (1915–2008), term/s: 1965–1969
- Ellen Bergli (born 1945), term/s: 1997–2001
- Bjarne Berg-Sæther (1919–2009)
- Kirsti Bergstø (born 1981), term/s: 2005–2009
- Arne Bergsvåg (born 1958), term/s: 2005–2009 and 2009–2013
- Kjartan Berland (born 1972)
- Oddvar Berrefjord (1918–1999), term/s: 1965–1969 and 1969–1973
- Pål Berrefjord (born 1977), term/s: 2001–2005
- Ola Bertelsen (1864–1946), term/s: 1931–1933
- Sindre Fossum Beyer (born 1977), term/s: 2005–2009
- Lars T. Bjella (1922–2013), term/s: 1950–1953, 1965–1969, 1969–1973 and 1973–1977
- Olaf Bjerke (1893–1957), term/s: 1954–1957
- Siri Bjerke (1958–2012)
- Olav Bjørkum (1859–1936), term/s: 1900–1903
- Nils Bjørnflaten (born 1942), term/s: 1985–1989
- Sten Egil Bjørnø (born 1946), term/s: 1985–1989
- Helge Bjørnsen (born 1954), term/s: 1997–2001 and 2001–2005
- Asbjørn Bjørnset (born 1938), term/s: 1973–1977, 1981–1985, 1985–1989 and 1989–1993
- Marianne S. Bjorøy (born 1962), term/s: 2013–2017
- Trond Henry Blattmann (born 1964), term/s: 2013–2017
- Birger Blom-Kalstø (1940–2011), term/s: 1969–1973 and 1977–1981
- Anne Marie Blomstereng (born 1940), term/s: 1989–1993
- Marion Gunstveit Bojanowski (born 1966), term/s: 2009–2013
- Carl Christian Bonnevie (1849–1917)
- Kristine Bonnevie (1872–1948)
- Eivind N. Borge (born 1950), term/s: 2005–2009
- Marianne Borgen (born 1951), term/s: 1989–1993, 1993–1997, 1997–2001 and 2001–2005
- Torstein Børte (1899–1985), term/s: 1958–1961
- Amund Braaten (1849–1919)
- Ola Skjåk Bræk (1912–1999), term/s: 1965–1969 and 1973–1977
- Tone Heimdal Brataas (born 1970)
- Johannes Bråten (1920–1997), term/s: 1965–1969 and 1969–1973
- Sylvi Bratten (born 1973), term/s: 1993–1997
- Arne Braut (born 1950), term/s: 2001–2005
- Johannes Brecke (1877–1943), term/s: 1922–1924 and 1925–1927
- Ruth Lilian Brekke (born 1938), term/s: 2001–2005
- Cathrin Bretzeg (born 1965), term/s: 2005–2009
- Lorentz Brinch (1910–1953), term/s: 1945–1949
- Jens Arnfinn Brødsjømoen (born 1958), term/s: 1993–1997 and 1997–2001
- Anton Wilhelm Brøgger (1884–1951), term/s: 1928–1930
- Hans Kristian Bromstad (1903–1971), term/s: 1958–1961 and 1961–1965
- Rolf Jarle Brøske (born 1980), term/s: 2001–2005 and 2005–2009
- Gunnar Brøvig (1924–1965), term/s: 1961–1965
- Harald Nikolai Brøvig (1917–2010), term/s: 1958–1961 and 1965–1969
- Anders Trulsson Bruland (1770–1818), term/s: 1815–1816
- Johan Christopher Brun (1838–1914), term/s: 1895–1897
- Kirsten Brunvoll (1895–1976), term/s: 1945–1949 and 1950–1953
- Anette Wiig Bryn (born 1964), term/s: 2005–2009
- Axel Buch (1930–1998), term/s: 1977–1981 and 1981–1985
- Hans Gabriel Nissen Buck (1848–1924), term/s: 1916–1918
- Sverre Bugge (born 1953), term/s: 2005–2009
- Vivian Knarvik Bugge (born 1960), term/s: 1997–2001
- Tove Billington Bye, term/s: 1973–1977 and 1977–1981
- Vegard Bye (born 1951), term/s: 1993–1997
- Astrid Aarhus Byrknes (born 1963), term/s: 2009–2013 and 2013–2017
- Ola Byrknes (born 1933), term/s: 1973–1977

== C ==
- Andreas Zeier Cappelen (1915–2008), term/s: 1961–1965
- Didrik Cappelen (1900–1970)
- Olav Sigurd Carlsen (1930–2013), term/s: 1973–1977
- Christen Christensen (1826–1900)
- Julius Christensen (1840–1923), term/s: 1907–1909 and 1913–1915
- Hans Langsted Christie (1826–1907), term/s: 1880–1882
- Hartvig Caspar Christie (1826–1873)
- Sara Stockfleth Christie (1857–1948), term/s: 1916–1918 and 1919–1921
- Isak Kobro Collett (1867–1911), term/s: 1910–1912
- Wenche Cumming (born 1944)

== D ==
- Per Kristian Dahl (born 1960), term/s: 2005–2009
- Torgeir Dahl (born 1953), term/s: 2009–2013
- Jon Georg Dale (born 1984), term/s: 2009–2013 and 2013–2017
- Birgit Dalland (1907–2007), term/s: 1945–1949
- Erling Danielsen (1922–2010), term/s: 1965–1969 and 1969–1973
- Jens Peter Debes (1776–1832)
- Kristin K. Devold (born 1939), term/s: 1989–1993
- Arnt Dolven (1892–1954)
- Morten Drægni (born 1983), term/s: 2005–2009 and 2009–2013
- Jørun Drevland (born 1944), term/s: 1993–1997
- Bodil Skjånes Dugstad (born 1927), term/s: 1973–1977
- Gerd Dvergsdal (born 1946), term/s: 2001–2005
- Nils S. Dvergsdal (1842–1921)

== E ==
- Jørgen Tandberg Ebbesen (1812–1887), term/s: 1877–1879
- Richard Edvardsen (born 1936), term/s: 1993–1997
- Einar Westye Egeberg Sr. (1851–1940), term/s: 1892–1894
- Lars Egeland (born 1957), term/s: 2001–2005, 2005–2009 and 2009–2013
- John Eggen (1885– ??), term/s: 1931–1933
- Siri Hov Eggen (born 1969), term/s: 2001–2005 and 2009–2013
- Magnhild Eia (born 1960), term/s: 1993–1997, 1997–2001, 2001–2005 and 2005–2009
- Gunn-Vivian Eide (born 1964), term/s: 1997–2001
- Kai Eide (born 1949), term/s: 1993–1997
- Johan Lauritz Eidem (died 1984), term/s: 1950–1953
- Arnljot Karstein Eidnes (1909–1990), term/s: 1961–1965 and 1965–1969
- Andreas E. Eidsaa (born 1970), term/s: 1993–1997
- Bjarte Eikeset (1937–2017), term/s: 1981–1985 and 1985–1989
- Terje Østebø Eikin (born 1975), term/s: 2013–2017
- Nina Eik-Nes (1900–1997), term/s: 1945–1949 and 1950–1953
- Kai Ekanger (born 1929), term/s: 1997–2001
- Jens Petter Ekornes (1942–2008), term/s: 2001–2005
- Arne Konrad Eldegard (born 1917), term/s: 1965–1969
- John Christian Elden (born 1967), term/s: 2013–2017
- Gunnar Ellefsen (1930–1997)
- Ludvig Ellefsrød (1894–1983), term/s: 1950–1953, 1954–1957 and 1958–1961
- Geir Elsebutangen (born 1964)
- Johan Elsness (born 1947)
- Ola Elvestuen (born 1967), term/s: 2001–2005, 2005–2009 and 2009–2013
- Jakob Eng (born 1937)
- Knut Engdahl (born 1933), term/s: 1977–1981
- Siri Engesæth (born 1969), term/s: 2013–2017
- Ann-Kristin Engstad (born 1982), term/s: 2005–2009
- Eldrid Erdal (1901–1997), term/s: 1961–1965
- Kjell Erfjord (born 1940), term/s: 1981–1985, 1985–1989 and 1989–1993
- Egil Werner Erichsen (1901–2000), term/s: 1954–1957
- Aud Voss Eriksen (born 1937)
- Ellen Eriksen (born 1972), term/s: 2009–2013 and 2013–2017
- Even Erlien (born 1955), term/s: 1993–1997 and 1997–2001
- Harald Espelund (born 1948), term/s: 2001–2005
- Carl Peter Parelius Essendrop (1818–1893)
- Per Egil Evensen (born 1950), term/s: 2005–2009

== F ==
- Wilhelm Hansen Færden (1852–1923)
- Hans Lindahl Falck (1863–1937), term/s: 1895–1897
- Lucie Paus Falck (born 1938), term/s: 1989–1993
- Jonas Cornelius Falk (1844–1915), term/s: 1898–1900
- Arne Falstad (1874–1958)
- Elisabeth Fanghol (born 1983)
- Ludvig Hope Faye (1931–2017), term/s: 1977–1981
- Elisabet Fidjestøl (born 1922), term/s: 1969–1973 and 1973–1977
- Kristian Mathias Fimland (1889– ??), term/s: 1950–1953
- Ingrid Fiskaa (born 1977), term/s: 1997–2001, 2001–2005 and 2009–2013
- Kleiv Fiskvik (born 1943), term/s: 1989–1993
- Ottar Fjærvoll (1914–1995), term/s: 1954–1957
- Eirik Langeland Fjeld (born 1973), term/s: 1997–2001
- Oddvar Flæte (born 1944), term/s: 1977–1981
- Gunn Elin Flakne (born 1964)
- Bertel Flaten (1900–1963), term/s: 1954–1957 and 1958–1961
- Roar Flåthen (born 1950), term/s: 1985–1989
- Odd Flattum (born 1942), term/s: 1981–1985 and 1985–1989
- Elise Fliflet (1893–1991), term/s: 1945–1949
- Reidar Floeng (1918–2014), term/s: 1961–1965
- Helen Fløisand (born 1952), term/s: 1993–1997 and 1997–2001
- Ragna Flotve (born 1960), term/s: 2001–2005
- Gunnar Fløystad (1902–1977), term/s: 1961–1965
- Aud Folkestad (born 1953), term/s: 1997–2001
- Nils Tore Føreland (born 1957), term/s: 1981–1985, 1985–1989 and 1993–1997
- Thor Erik Forsberg (born 1980)
- Åse Fosli (1924–2009), term/s: 1977–1981 and 1981–1985
- Ingunn Foss (born 1960), term/s: 2005–2009
- Jon Fossum (1923–2007), term/s: 1965–1969
- Brit Fougner (born 1946), term/s: 1989–1993
- Kitty Petrine Fredriksen (1910–2003), term/s: 1945–1949 and 1950–1953
- Nicolai Friis (1815–1888), term/s: 1862–1863
- Andreas Frivåg (1925–1991), term/s: 1977–1981
- Torbjørn Frøysnes (born 1946), term/s: 1989–1993
- Erlend Fuglum (born 1978), term/s: 2005–2009 and 2009–2013

== G ==
- Hans Gaare (1905–1993), term/s: 1961–1965, 1965–1969 and
- Andreas Bernhard Gamst (born 1923), term/s: 1969–1973
- Torgeir Garmo (born 1941), term/s: 1981–1985
- Jens Gasmann (1776–1850)
- Monica Gåsvatn (born 1968), term/s: 2017–2021
- Gerhard Meidell Gerhardsen (1885–1931)
- Masud Gharahkhani (born 1982)
- Helga Gitmark (1929–2008), term/s: 1977–1981
- Arne Gjedrem (1890–1978), term/s: 1945–1949
- Arvid Gjengedal (born 1943), term/s: 1985–1989
- Bjartmar Gjerde (1931–2009), term/s: 1965–1969
- Gunn Berit Gjerde (born 1954), term/s: 2005–2009
- John Gjerde (born 1929), term/s: 1977–1981
- Rolf Gjermundsen (1921–1994), term/s: 1969–1973 and 1973–1977
- Kari Gløersen (born 1948), term/s: 1997–2001 and 2001–2005
- Arnulf Goksøyr (born 1963), term/s: 2013–2017
- Per M. Goverud (1905–1976), term/s: 1958–1961
- Sylvi Graham (born 1951), term/s: 2005–2009
- Thora Grahl-Nielsen (1901–1976), term/s: 1950–1953, 1954–1957 and 1958–1961
- Gudbrand Granum (1893–1984), term/s: 1945–1949
- Knut Gravråk (born 1985), term/s: 2005–2009
- Rachel Grepp (1879–1961)
- Thorvald Gressum (1932–2008), term/s: 1977–1981
- Åslaug Grinde (born 1931), term/s: 1969–1973
- Alf Grindrud (1904–1959), term/s: 1945–1949
- Ole Henrik Grønn (born 1984), term/s: 2005–2009
- Hallgeir Grøntvedt (born 1959), term/s: 2009–2013 and 2013–2017
- Hans Fredrik Grøvan (born 1953), term/s: 2001–2005
- Mikal Grøvan (1899–1956), term/s: 1950–1953 and 1954–1957
- Håkon Gulbrandsen (born 1969), term/s: 1989–1993
- Carl August Gulbranson (1831–1910)
- Gunnar Edvard Gundersen (1927–2017)
- Kristian Birger Gundersen (1907–1977), term/s: 1945–1949 and 1950–1953
- Mette Gundersen (born 1972), term/s: 2001–2005
- Laila Gustavsen (born 1973), term/s: 2001–2005 and 2005–2009
- Hans Guttorm (1927–2013), term/s: 1965–1969
- Ferhat Güven (born 1983), term/s: 2013–2017

== H ==
- Christian Wegner Haaland (1892–1952), term/s: 1945–1949
- Thomas Vigner Christiansen Haaland (1859–1913), term/s: 1904–1906
- Sigmund P. Haave (1916–2001), term/s: 1965–1969
- Øyvind Håbrekke (born 1969), term/s: 1997–2001, 2001–2005 and 2005–2009
- Barbro-Lill Hætta-Jacobsen (born 1972), term/s: 2001–2005
- Geir Hafredahl (born 1962), term/s: 1989–1993
- Marcelius Haga (1882–1968)
- Ingjerd Thon Hagaseth (born 1967), term/s: 2013–2017
- Robert Hagelin (born 1884), term/s: 1931–1933
- Kåre Grøndahl Hagem (1915–2008), term/s: 1958–1961
- Gunnar Odd Hagen (1921–1997), term/s: 1969–1973 and 1973–1977
- Mari Hagen (born 1981), term/s: 2001–2005
- Per Hagen (1899–1983), term/s: 1950–1953
- Per N. Hagen (1936–2010), term/s: 1977–1981
- Sigmund Hagen (born 1976), term/s: 2001–2005
- Torstein Håland (1925–2004), term/s: 1973–1977
- Inger Haldorsen (1899–1982), term/s: 1958–1961, 1961–1965 and 1965–1969
- Egil Halmøy (1901–1984), term/s: 1961–1965
- August Herman Halvorsen (1866–1929), term/s: 1919–1921
- Carl Herman Halvorsen (1837–1918)
- Isak Halvorsen (1877– ??), term/s: 1928–1930
- Roald Halvorsen (1914–2010), term/s: 1945–1949
- Tor Halvorsen (1930–1987), term/s: 1969–1973
- Kristian Alfred Hammer (1898–1965), term/s: 1954–1957
- Andreas Hamnes (born 1941), term/s: 2005–2009
- Sigrid Brattabø Handegard (born 1963)
- David Hansen (born 1978), term/s: 1997–2001 and 2001–2005
- Even Hansen (1790–1840)
- Halvar Hansen (born 1947), term/s: 1981–1985
- Jan Henrik Nitter Hansen (1801–1879)
- Karstein Hansen (born 1932), term/s: 1997–2001 and 2001–2005
- Knut Werner Hansen (born 1951), term/s: 1997–2001, 2001–2005 and 2005–2009
- Øystein Langholm Hansen (born 1957)
- Siv Elin Hansen (born 1974), term/s: 2013–2017
- Bjarne Hanssen (1917–2014), term/s: 1973–1977
- Hans Hanssen (1853–1923), term/s: 1907–1909 and 1910–1912
- Hans Martin Hanssen (1911–1971), term/s: 1950–1953
- Kjell Hanssen (1932–2014), term/s: 1969–1973
- Christopher Hansteen (1822–1912)
- Magne Haraldstad (1937–2008), term/s: 1973–1977
- Bodolf Hareide (born 1937), term/s: 1973–1977
- Gustav Hareide (born 1950), term/s: 1989–1993 and 1997–2001
- Morten Harg (born 1955), term/s: 1981–1985
- Kåre Harila (born 1935), term/s: 1997–2001
- Wegard Harsvik (born 1967), term/s: 1989–1993
- Karl Einar Haslestad (born 1952), term/s: 1981–1985, 1997–2001 and 2001–2005
- Birger Hatlebakk (1912–1997), term/s: 1969–1973
- Roald Aga Haug (born 1972), term/s: 2009–2013
- Ivar J. Hauge (1936–2017), term/s: 1973–1977
- Einar Kristian Haugen (1905–1968), term/s: 1950–1953,1954–1957 and 1958–1961
- Rita Haugerud (1919–2014), term/s: 1965–1969
- Åshild Haugland (born 1986), term/s: 2009–2013
- Olaug Hay (1902–2000), term/s: 1954–1957
- Alvhild Hedstein (born 1966), term/s: 2005–2009 and 2009–2013
- Thomas Johannessen Heftye (1822–1886), term/s: 1880–1882
- Sissel Knutsen Hegdal (born 1965), term/s: 2009–2013 and 2013–2017
- Ola T. Heggem (born 1952), term/s: 2001–2005
- Johannes Heggland (1919–2008), term/s: 1958–1961
- Astrid Dirdal Hegrestad (1929–2014), term/s: 1969–1973, 1973–1977 and 1977–1981
- Eva Heir (born 1943), term/s: 1989–1993 and 1993–1997
- Frode Helgerud (born 1950), term/s: 1997–2001 and 2013–2017
- Gunn Marit Helgesen (born 1958), term/s: 1993–1997, 1997–2001, 2001–2005, 2005–2009, and 2009–2013
- Nils Helgheim (1903–1982), term/s: 1954–1957 and 1958–1961
- Håkon Helgøy (born 1947), term/s: 1985–1989 and 1989–1993
- Sven Helleberg (1929–1980), term/s: 1973–1977 and 1977–1971
- Magnar Hellebust (1914–2008), term/s: 1969–1973 and 1973–1977
- Andreas J. Hemma (1866–1950)
- Kai G. Henriksen (1956–2016), term/s: 1985–1989
- Kari Henriksen (born 1955), term/s: 2005–2009
- Marit Svarva Henriksen (1925–2014), term/s: 1958–1961, 1961–1965 and 1969–1973
- Martin Henriksen (born 1979), term/s: 2009–2013
- Anna Sofie Herland (1913–1990), term/s: 1958–1961 and 1961–1965
- Anne Valen Hestetun (1920–2009), term/s: 1961–1965 and 1969–1973
- Egil Hestnes (born 1943), term/s: 1989–1993 and 2001–2005
- Margaret E. Hillestad (born 1961)
- Hans Hjelle (1916–2008), term/s: 1958–1961 and 1961–1965
- Halvor Thorbjørn Hjertvik (1914–1995), term/s: 1958–1961 and 1961–1965
- Henry Olaf Hoff (1912–2011), term/s: 1954–1957
- Olaf Alfred Hoffstad (died 1943), term/s: 1919–21, 1922–24 and 1931–33
- Sigurd Høgaas (1892–1969), term/s: 1945–1949
- Ivar Hognestad (born 1956), term/s: 2005–2009
- Odd Højdahl (1921–1994), term/s: 1961–1965
- Ida Marie Holen (born 1958), term/s: 2009–2013
- Bjørn Erik Hollevik (born 1956), term/s: 2013–2017
- Andreas Holm (1906–2003), term/s: 1954–1957 and 1961–1965
- Christian Hintze Holm (born 1964), term/s: 2001–2005
- Einar Knut Holm (born 1933), term/s: 1981–1985
- Magnhild Holmberg (1943–2013), term/s: 1993–1997 and 2005–2009
- Jakob Sigurd Holmgard (1929–2013), term/s: 1977–1981 and 1981–1985
- Bjørg Holmsen (1931–2015), term/s: 1973–1977
- Amandus Holte (1888–1965)
- Thorleif Holth (1931–2014), term/s: 1961–1965
- Hulda Holtvedt (born 1999), term/s: 2017–2021
- Andreas Honerød (1905–1965), term/s: 1961–1965 and 1965–1969
- Hans Hilding Hønsvall (born 1952), term/s: 2001–2005
- Michael Peter Hopp (1787– ??), term/s: 1848–1850
- Ragna Hørbye (1861–1950)
- Hassa Horn Jr. (1873–1968), term/s: 1910–1912
- Ragnar Horn (1913–2002), term/s: 1958–1961
- Helge Høva (1928–2010), term/s: 1997–2001
- Harald Victor Hove (born 1983), term/s: 2005–2009
- Per Høybråten (1932–1990), term/s: 1973–1977
- Gudrun Tandberg Høykoll (born 1924), term/s: 1965–1969
- Finn Sture Hultgreen (born 1949), term/s: 1993–1997 and 1997–2001
- Otto Huseklepp (1892–1964), term/s: 1945–1949 and 1950–1953
- Kari Husøy (born 1952), term/s: 1993–1997
- Mani Hussaini (born 1987)
- Gunnar Hynne (born 1953), term/s: 2005–2009

== I ==
- Georg Indrevik (born 1939), term/s: 2001–2005 and 2005–2009
- Halvard Ingebrigtsen (born 1970)
- Johnny Ingebrigtsen (born 1959), term/s: 2005–2009 and 2013–2017
- Odd Emil Ingebrigtsen (born 1964), term/s: 1989–1993
- Roger Ingebrigtsen (born 1966), term/s: 1989–1993
- Torbjørn Røe Isaksen (born 1978), term/s: 2005–2009
- Baard Iversen (1836–1920), term/s: 1892–1894
- Bjørn Iversen (born 1953), term/s: 1993–1997 and 1997–2001
- Jan Iversen (1916–1999), term/s: 1973–1977
- Turid Iversen (born 1934), term/s: 1993–1997

== J ==
- Henrik Jahre (born 1937), term/s: 1973–1977 and 1977–1981
- Gunnar Jakobsen (1916–1992), term/s: 1958–1961
- Øistein Jakobsen (1907–1947), term/s: 1945–1949
- Nils Aage Jegstad (born 1950), term/s: 2005–2009
- Hans Jensen (1817–1888)
- Hege Jensen (born 1971), term/s: 2013–2017
- Jentoft Jensen (1901–1953), term/s: 1945–1949
- Kjell Håvard Jensen (born 1958), term/s: 2013–2017
- Anders Johansen (1929–2015), term/s: 1969–1973 and 1973–1977
- Gunda Johansen (born 1952), term/s: 2005–2009
- Johan Jentoft Johansen (1906–1973), term/s: 1937–1945 and 1958–1961
- Odd Harald Johansen (born 1982), term/s: 2005–2009
- Ole Johansen (1904–1986), term/s: 1965–1969
- Sigurd Marius Johansen (1906–1989), term/s: 1954–1957 and 1958–1961
- Jennie Johnsen (born 1977), term/s: 2005–2009
- Torhild Johnsen (born 1934), term/s: 1981–1985
- Ivar Jørgensen (1877–1956), term/s: 1913–1915, 1916–1918 and 1919–1921
- Lasse Juliussen (born 1986)

== K ==
- Ragnar Kalheim (1926–1974), term/s: 1973–1977
- Ragnhild Aarflot Kalland (born 1960), term/s: 2001–2005 and 2005–2009
- Gretha Kant (born 1945), term/s: 2001–2005
- Pål Kårbø (born 1973), term/s: 2001–2005
- Astrid Gunhilde Karlsen (1920–2008), term/s: 1954–1957, 1973–1977 and 1977–1981
- Kåre Karlsen (1930–2009), term/s: 1973–1977
- Steinar Karlstrøm (born 1965), term/s: 2017–2021
- Ingebjørg Karmhus (1936–2009), term/s: 1989–1993
- Tollef Kilde (1853–1947), term/s: 1891–1894
- Åse Lill Kimestad (born 1955), term/s: 1989–1993, 1993–1997 and 2001–2005
- Hilda Sofie Kindt (1881–1966)
- Lars Reidulv Kirkeby-Garstad (1907–1977), term/s: 1954–1957, 1958–1961, 1961–1965 and 1965–1969
- Olav G. Kirkeluten (1904–1973), term/s: 1954–1957
- Francis Kjeldsberg (1869–1948), term/s: 1922–1924
- Ole Kristian Kjølholdt (born 1950), term/s: 1997–2001
- Egil Kjølner (1920–2010), term/s: 1969–1973 and 1973–1977
- Bjarne Kjørberg (1916–1969), term/s: 1965–1969 and 1969–1973
- Synnøve Brenden Klemetrud (born 1959), term/s: 2001–2005 and 2005–2009
- Per Kleppe (born 1923), term/s: 1954–1957
- Jenny Klinge (born 1975), term/s: 2005–2009
- Sverre Sverressøn Klingenberg (1882–1958)
- Ole Johannes Kløv (1925–2009), term/s: 1969–1973, 1973–1977 and 1977–1981
- Ole Knapp (1931–2015)
- Kai Knudsen (1903–1977), term/s: 1945–1949
- Kjell Knudsen (born 1931), term/s: 1965–1969
- Knut Andreas Knudsen (1919–2001), term/s: 1961–1965 and 1965–1969
- Eigil Knutsen (born 1988), term/s: 2013–2017
- Geir Knutsen (born 1959), term/s: 2005–2009
- Lotte Grepp Knutsen (born 1973), term/s: 2009–2013
- Martin Gunnar Knutsen (1918–2001)
- Nelly Bell Knutsen (1905–1991), term/s: 1961–1965
- Niels-Henrik Kolderup (1898–1971)
- Eva Kolstad (1918–1999), term/s: 1957–1961 and 1965–1969
- Morgan Kornmo (1925–2010)
- Knut Korsæth (born 1932)
- Mette S. Korsrud (born 1941), term/s: 2001–2005 and 2005–2009
- Johan Andreas Kraft (1808–1896)
- Kjell Thorbjørn Kristensen (1927–1995), term/s: 1958–1961 and 1961–1965
- Thorleif Kristensen (1916–1997), term/s: 1965–1969
- Adolf Kristoffersen (1891–1964), term/s: 1934–1936, 1937–1945 and 1945–1949
- Sverre Krogh (1921–2006)
- Gunvor Krogsæter (born 1933), term/s: 1981–1985
- Rangdi Krogstad (born 1966), term/s: 2001–2005 and 2013–2017
- Sigmund Kroslid (born 1947)
- Torstein Olav Kuvaas (1908–1996), term/s: 1950–1953, 1954–1957 and 1965–1969
- Berit Kvæven (born 1942), term/s: 1997–2001
- Aud Kvalbein (born 1948), term/s: 2001–2005 and 2005–2009
- David P. Kvile (1861–1918)
- Torvald Kvinlaug (1911–1997), term/s: 1961–1965, 1965–1969 and 1969–1973

== L ==
- Ellen Lahn (1918–2004), term/s: 1973–1977
- Johan Widing Heiberg Landmark (1802–1878)
- Halvor Moxnes Landsem (1913–1977), term/s: 1954–1957 and 1958–1961
- Magne Langerud (1942–1971), term/s: 1965–1969
- Bård Langsåvold (born 1952), term/s: 2005–2009 and 2009–2013
- Arne Langset (1893–1971), term/s: 1950–1953 and 1954–1957
- Egil Oddvar Larsen (1923–2009), term/s: 1969–1973
- Gry Larsen (born 1975), term/s: 1997–2001 and 2005–2009
- Helge Solum Larsen (1969–2015), term/s: 1997–2001 and 2005–2009
- Kjell Ivar Larsen (born 1968), term/s: 2005–2009, 2009–2013 and 2013–2017
- Sigbjørn Larsen (born 1936), term/s: 1981–1985 and 1993–1997
- Thorvald Andreas Larsen (1863–1936)
- Linn Laupsa (born 1977), term/s: 2001–2005 and 2005–2009
- Stein Erik Lauvås (born 1965), term/s: 2001–2005 and 2005–2009
- Ove Lemicka (born 1961), term/s: 1989–1993 and 1993–1997
- Magne Lerheim (1929–1994), term/s: 1965–1969 and 1969–1973
- Andreas M. Lervik (born 1969), term/s: 2001–2005 and 2005–2009
- Thorbjørn Lie (1943–2006), term/s: 2005–2009
- Kristian Lien (1915–1996), term/s: 1969–1973
- Jørgen Adolf Lier (1906–1994), term/s: 1958–1961 and 1961–1965
- Asbjørn Liland (born 1936), term/s: 1965–1969
- Tone Liljeroth (born 1975), term/s: 2009–2013
- Thor Lillehovde (born 1948), term/s: 1997–2001, 2009–2013 and 2013–2017
- Bente Elin Lilleøkseth (born 1974), term/s: 2001–2005
- Kari Oftedal Lima (born 1943), term/s: 1993–1997 and 1997–2001
- Asbjørn Lindhjem (1910–1994), term/s: 1969–1973
- Johannes Lislerud (1911–1989), term/s: 1954–1957, 1958–1961 and 1961–1965
- Asbjørn Listerud (1905–1981), term/s: 1961–1965 and 1965–1969
- Sylvi Listhaug (born 1977)
- Tor Arne Bell Ljunggren (born 1962), term/s: 2013–2017
- Liv Løberg, term/s: 2001–2005 and 2009–2013
- Ebba Lodden (1913–1997), term/s: 1950–1953, 1958–1961 and 1961–1965
- Olav Lofthaug (1909–1990), term/s: 1969–1973 and 1973–1977
- Arve Lønnum Jr. (born 1961), term/s: 1993–1997
- Bjørn Lothe (1952–2009), term/s: 1997–2001, 2001–2005 and 2005–2009
- Ida Marie Løvlien (born 1974), term/s: 1997–2001
- Ole H. Løvlien (1897–1970), term/s: 1958–1961
- Hakon Lunde (1918–2005), term/s: 1989–1993 and 1997–2001
- Karl Lunde (1892–1975), term/s: 1950–1953 and 1954–1957
- Magnar Lussand (born 1945), term/s: 1997–2001
- Einar Lutro (born 1943), term/s: 2005–2009
- Ole Lysø (born 1940), term/s: 1977–1981, 1981–1985, 1985–1989 and 1989–1993

== M ==
- Dagmar Maalstad (1902–2000), term/s: 1958–1961
- Khalid Mahmood (born 1959), term/s: 2005–2009
- Sigurd Marcussen (1905–2006), term/s: 1950–1953
- Leif Måsvær (born 1941), term/s: 1989–1993
- Per Botolf Maurseth (born 1969), term/s: 1993–1997
- Jan Birger Medhaug (born 1941), term/s: 2001–2005
- Lydolf Lind Meløy (1908–1999)
- Alfred Theodor Michelsen (1874–1941)
- Lars-Henrik Paarup Michelsen (born 1981), term/s: 2005–2009
- Bjørg Mikalsen (born 1945), term/s: 2005–2009
- William Mikkelsen (1901–1962), term/s: 1945–1949
- Olga Mistereggen (1894–1970), term/s: 1950–1953
- Nina Mjøberg (born 1964), term/s: 1989–1993, 2005–2009 and 2009–2013
- Peter Sigurd Mjør (1926–1975), term/s: 1958–1961, 1965–1969 and 1973–1977
- Geir Mo (born 1966), term/s: 1993–1997
- Bjørg Tysdal Moe (born 1954), term/s: 2005–2009
- Kristin Moe (born 1954)
- Trygve Moe (1920–1998), term/s: 1965–1969
- Olav Moen (1909–1995), term/s: 1973–1977
- Per Mohn (born 1945), term/s: 1989–1993
- Petra Mohn (1911–1996), term/s: 1961–1965
- Sigfrid Mohn (born 1930), term/s: 1977–1981 and 1981–1985
- Ivar Molde (born 1949), term/s: 1993–1997
- Camilla Mollatt (born 1971), term/s: 2013–2017
- Holm Sigvald Morgenlien (1909–1995), term/s: 1950–1953
- Albert Andreas Mørkved (1898–1990), term/s: 1958–1961
- Lorents Mørkved (1844–1924), term/s: 1910–1912, 1913–1915 and 1916–1918
- Kurt Mosbakk (born 1934), term/s: 1973–1977
- Jens Marcus Mottré (1886–1966), term/s: 1945–1949
- Hugo Munthe-Kaas (1922–2012)
- Knut Myhre (born 1931), term/s: 1969–1973
- Anders Myklebust (born 1928), term/s: 1969–1973

== N ==
- Per Næsset (1898–1970), term/s: 1945–1949
- Eivind Nævdal-Bolstad (born 1987), term/s: 2009–2013
- Olav Steinar Namtvedt (born 1947), term/s: 1993–1997 and 2001–2005
- Johan Mjelde Natvig (1915–1998), term/s: 1965–1969 and 1969–1973
- Ivar Høsteng Neerland (1907–1978), term/s: 1958–1961
- Arnfinn Nergård (born 1952), term/s: 2005–2009
- Hege Nerland (1966–2007)
- Steinar Ness (born 1959), term/s: 1981–1985 and 1985–1989
- Harold Nicolaisen (1929–2009), term/s: 1965–1969
- Solfrid Nilsen (born 1937), term/s: 1989–1993 and 1997–2001
- Hartvig Nissen (1815–1874)
- Arnt Njargel (1901–1985), term/s: 1961–1965
- Jan Levor Njargel (born 1943), term/s: 1989–1993
- Knut H. Njøs (1883–1934)
- Olav O. Nomeland (1919–1986), term/s: 1965–1969 and 1969–1973
- Mette Nord (born 1959)
- Janne Sjelmo Nordås (born 1964), term/s: 2001–2005 and 2005–2009
- Anker Nordbø (1920–1978), term/s: 1973–1977
- Kurt Nordbø (1931–2009), term/s: 1973–1977
- Paula Nordhus (1935–1994), term/s: 1981–1985 and 1985–1989
- Jorid Holstad Nordmelan (born 1991)
- Iver G. Nordseth (born 1951), term/s: 1997–2001 and 2005–2009
- Sigurd Normann (1874–1950)
- Arvid Nyberg (born 1928), term/s: 1973–1977, 1977–1981 and 1981–1985
- Olga Nybø (born 1930), term/s: 1981–1985
- Gulborg Nygaard (1902–1991), term/s: 1954–1957

== O ==
- Lars Ødegård (born 1956), term/s: 1993–1997, 1997–2001 and 2001–2005
- Anne Odenmarck (born 1955), term/s: 2013–2017
- Jon Øyvind Odland (born 1954), term/s: 2005–2009 and 2009–2013
- Ivar Odnes (born 1963), term/s: 2013–2017
- Lars Andreas Oftedahl
- Kjell Erik Øie (born 1960), term/s: 2005–2009
- Ingebjørg Øisang (1892–1956), term/s: 1934–1936, 1937–1945, 1950–1953 and 1954–1957
- Ole Øisang (1893–1963), term/s: 1925–1927
- Tønnes Oksefjell (1901–1976), term/s: 1945–1949
- Toralv Øksnevad (1891–1975)
- Harald Sverre Olsen (born 1921), term/s: 1969–1983
- Knut Magnus Olsen (born 1954)
- Per Arne Olsen (born 1961)
- Reidar Engell Olsen (born 1933), term/s: 1969–1973 and 1973–1977
- Sven Olsen (1922–2001), term/s: 1961–1965
- Terje Olsen (born 1951), term/s: 1993–1997 and 2009–2013
- Tom Strømstad Olsen (born 1971), term/s: 2005–2009
- Odd Omland (born 1956)
- Odvar Omland (1923–2025), term/s: 1977–1981
- Christopher Frimann Omsen (1761–1829)
- Iren Opdahl (born 1974), term/s: 2013–2017
- Fredrik Ording (1870–1929), term/s: 1922–1924 and 1925–1927 he served as a deputy representative to the Parliament of Norway
- Anita Orlund (born 1964), term/s: 1997–2001, 2001–2005, 2005–2009 and 2009–2013
- Hildur Os (1913–2009), term/s: 1961–1965, 1965–1969, 1969–1973 and 1973–1977
- Anita Østby (born 1972), term/s: 2005–2009
- Sverre Østhagen (1918–1990), term/s: 1950–1935 and 1954–1957
- Per Østvold (born 1949), term/s: 1993–1997 and 2001–2005
- Terje Ottar (born 1945), term/s: 1989–1993 and 1993–1997
- Arve Hans Otterlei (born 1932), term/s: 1997–2001
- Kjell Øvergård (born 1947), term/s: 1997–2001
- Bjarne Øverhaug (1927–1996), term/s: 1969–1973 and 1973–1977
- Randi Øverland (born 1952)
- Asbjørn Øye (1902–1998), term/s: 1945–1949
- Jarmund Øyen (born 1944), term/s: 1993–1997 and 1997–2001
- Eivind Øygarden (1918–1979), term/s: 1969–1973 and 1973–1977
- Tora Øyna (1898–1991), term/s: 1958–1961 and 1961–1965

== P ==
- Olav Paulssøn (1822–1896)
- Anne Rygh Pedersen (born 1967), term/s: 2001–2005
- Erna Mundal Pedersen (1929–2014), term/s: 1989–1993
- Herman Pedersen (1928–2009), term/s: 1965–1969
- Steinar Pedersen (born 1947), term/s: 1993–1997
- Harald Pettersen (1869–1937), term/s: 1907–1909
- Petter Pettersson Jr. (1911–1984), term/s: 1954–1957, 1961–1965, 1965–1969 and 1969–1973
- Ingrid Piltingsrud (born 1942), term/s: 1981–1985
- Ivar B. Prestbakmo (born 1968), term/s: 1993–1997 and 1997–2001
- Ingebjørg Prestegard (born 1928)
- Kari Mette Prestrud (born 1977), term/s: 2005–2009
- Torolf Prytz (1858–1938), term/s: 1900–1903

== R ==
- Albert Raaen (1887–1971)
- Ingvill Raaum (1935–2012), term/s: 1969–1973 and 1973–1977
- Mathias Råheim (born 1951), term/s: 1997–2001 and 2001–2005
- Abid Raja (born 1975)
- Jon Ramstad (1925–2014), term/s: 1969–1973
- Einar Normann Rasmussen (1907–1975), term/s: 1954–1957 and 1958–1961
- Kari Raustein (born 1965), term/s: 2013–2017
- Sigbjørn Ravnåsen (1941–2016), term/s: 1989–1993 and 1993–1997
- Stein Reegård (born 1951), term/s: 2005–2009
- Marie Borge Refsum (born 1927), term/s: 1973–1977
- Oddvar Reiakvam (born 1985)
- Paul Reine (1932–2009), term/s: 1981–1985 and 1985–1989
- Kirsten Reitan (born 1942), term/s: 1993–1997
- Eivind Reiten (born 1953), term/s: 1985 to 1989
- Steinar Reiten (born 1963), term/s: 2001–2005 and Møre og Romsdal during the term 2009–2013
- Bernhard Riksfjord (born 1946), term/s: 1993–1997 and 1997–2001
- Johannes Rindal (born 1984), term/s: 2005–2009
- Dagfinn Ripnes (born 1939), term/s: 1997–2001
- Ingvarda Røberg (1895–1990), term/s: 1958–1961
- Ragnhild Rød (1884– ??), term/s: 1937–1945
- Torleiv Ole Rognum (born 1948), term/s: 2009–2013
- Nils A. Røhne (born 1949), term/s: 1997–2001, 2001–2005 and 2005–2009
- Anna Kristine Jahr Røine (born 1949), term/s: 1977–1981
- Anton Johan Rønneberg (1856–1922), term/s: 1904–1906
- Kristian Rønneberg (1898–1982), term/s: 1954–1957
- Kjell Ingolf Ropstad (born 1985), term/s: 2005-2009
- Anders Kristian Rørvik (1861– ??), term/s: 1907–1909
- Nils Røsholt (born 1949), term/s: 1993–1997
- Helga Rullestad (born 1949), term/s: 1997–2001 and 2001–2005
- Ove Rullestad (born 1940), term/s: 1997–2001
- Åshild Karlstrøm Rundhaug (born 1955), term/s: 1997–2001
- Ola Thorleif Ruud (born 1926), term/s: 1958–1961, 1961–1965, 1965–1969 and 1969–1973
- Øyvind Ruud (1944–2015), term/s: 1993–1997
- Roger Ryberg (born 1952), term/s: 1989–1993
- Anne Lise Ryel (born 1958), term/s: 2005–2009
- Signe Marie Stray Ryssdal (born 1924)

== S ==
- Berge Sæberg (1923–2010), term/s: 1969–1973, 1973–1977 and 1977–1981
- Ann-Marit Sæbønes (born 1945)
- Bersvend Salbu (born 1968), term/s: 2013–2017
- Bjarne Saltnes (1934–2016), term/s: 1977–1981, 1981–1985 and 1985–1989
- O. Normann Sand (1921–1974), term/s: 1965–1969
- Bjørg Sandal (born 1955), term/s: 2005–2009
- Nils R. Sandal (born 1950), term/s: 1997–2001
- Dag Henrik Sandbakken (born 1957), term/s: 2005–2009
- Arne Nic. Sandnes (1920–1985), term/s: 1965–1969, 1969–1973 and 1973–1977
- Arne Sandnes (1925–2006), term/s: 1977–1981 and 1981–1985
- Ingebjørg Kasin Sandsdalen (1915–2003)
- Anne Helene Sandum (born 1973)
- Anne Sandum (born 1973), term/s: 2009–2013 and 2013–2017
- Liv Sandven (born 1946), term/s: 1997–2001
- Dagmar Sandvig (1921–1989), term/s: 1954–1957 and 1969–1973
- Ole K. Sara (1936–2013)
- Hermann Saue (born 1939), term/s: 1977–1981, 1981–1985 and 1985–1989
- Kirsti Saxi (born 1953), term/s: 1997–2001, 2001–2005 and 2005–2009
- Kari Schanke (1922–2006), term/s: 1965–1969
- Johan M. Schie (1863–1942)
- Ingrid Schjelderup (born 1932), term/s: 1977–1981 and 1981–1985
- Martha Schrøder (1918–2009), term/s: 1961–1965
- Britt Schultz (born 1945), term/s: 1977–1981
- Odd Sefland (born 1935), term/s: 1977–1981
- Hans Seierstad (born 1951), term/s: 2001–2005
- Johannes Seland (1912–1999), term/s: 1954–1957
- Rune Selj (born 1952), term/s: 1981–1985
- Gunnar Sethil (1872–1941), term/s: 1916–1918 and 1919–1921
- Leif Johan Sevland (born 1961), term/s: 1985–1989 and 1993–1997
- Lars Sigmundstad (born 1943), term/s: 1969–1973 and 1973–1977
- Trygve Simonsen (1937–2011), term/s: 1989–1993
- Odin Sivertsen (1914–2008), term/s: 1973–1977
- Runar Sjåstad (born 1968)
- Brynjulv Sjetne (1917–1976), term/s: 1961–1965
- Bjørn Johnny Skaar (born 1971), term/s: 1997–2001
- Arne Skaare (1907–1981), term/s: 1954–1957
- Snøfrid Skaare (born 1939), term/s: 1993–1997
- Magnus Skåden (born 1953), term/s: 1997–2001
- Gro Skartveit (born 1965), term/s: 2005–2009
- Anders Skauge (1912–2000), term/s: 1954–1957
- Edel Viola Ski (1918–2010), term/s: 1961–1965
- Martin Ski (1912–1983), term/s: 1961–1965
- Nils-Olav Skilbred (born 1949), term/s: 1997–2001, 2001–2005 and 2005–2009
- Johan Skipnes (1909–2005), term/s: 1954–1957
- Per Skjærvik (born 1953), term/s: 2005–2009
- Elsa Skjerven (1919–2005), term/s: 1965–1969, 1969–1973 and 1973–1977
- Endre Skjørestad (born 1953), term/s: 1993–1997, 1997–2001 and 2001–2005
- John Kristen Skogan (born 1942)
- Per Kristian Skulberg (born 1951), term/s: 1989–1993 and 1993–1997
- Oskar Slaaen (1907–1972), term/s: 1965–1969
- Øyvind Slåke (born 1965), term/s: 2001–2005
- Anne Kathrine Slungård (born 1964), term/s: 1997–2001, 2001–2005 and 2009–2013
- Torstein Slungård (1931–2009), term/s: 1965–1969 and 1969–1973
- Inger Smuk (born 1947), term/s: 1993–1997
- Oddbjørn Snøfugl (born 1941), term/s: 1969–1973
- Solveig Solbakken (born 1949), term/s: 1997–2001 and 2001–2005
- Synnøve Solbakken (born 1957), term/s: 2005–2009
- Eirik Lae Solberg (born 1971), term/s: 1993–1997
- Harald Solberg (born 1976), term/s: 1997–2001 and 2001–2005
- Torje Olsen Solberg (1856– ??), term/s: 1916–1918
- Torstein Tvedt Solberg (born 1985), term/s: 2009–2013
- Christian Sole (1896–1980), term/s: 1945–1949
- Greta Johanne Solfall (born 1959), term/s: 2009–2013 and 2013–2017
- Inge Solli (born 1959), term/s: 2005–2009
- Anton Sommerseth (1909–1998), term/s: 1958–1961, 1961–1965 and 1965–1969
- Nils Sønnevik (1911–1988), term/s: 1958–1961 and 1961–1965
- Gerd Søraa (born 1934), term/s: 1977–1981
- Karin Søraunet (born 1967), term/s: 2001–2005
- Ingjald Ørbeck Sørheim (1937–2010), term/s: 1969–1973
- Kari Sørheim (born 1948), term/s: 1997–2001 and 2001–2005
- Hanne Dyveke Søttar (born 1965), term/s: 2001–2005 and 2005–2009
- Terje Søviknes (born 1969)
- Olav Søyland (1921–2001), term/s: 1965–1969 and 1969–1973
- Jenny Søyseth (1922–1997), term/s: 1973–1977
- Kaare Sparby (1904–2001), term/s: 1945–1949
- Christian Sparre (1859–1940)
- Jørgen Fredrik Spørck (1787–1866)
- Charlotte Spurkeland (born 1987), term/s: 2013–2017
- Tom Staahle (born 1972), term/s: 2005–2009 and 2009–2013
- Gunnar Stålsett (born 1935), term/s: 1977–1981
- Hroar Stange (1921–2017), term/s: 1969–1973 and 1973–1977
- Anne Marie Stavnes (1918–2002)
- Martin Stavrum (born 1938), term/s: 1993–1997
- Gunnar Stavseth (born 1943), term/s: 1969–1973
- John Toralf Steffensen (1919–1996), term/s: 1973–1977
- Sigmund Steinnes (born 1959)
- Oskar Steinvik (1908–1975), term/s: 1958–1961
- Ruth Stenersen (born 1960), term/s: 1997–2001 and 2001–2005
- Asbjørn Stensaker (1885–1959), term/s: 1934–1936 and 1937–1945
- Øyvind Alfred Stensrud (1887–1956), term/s: 1945–1949, 1950–1953 and 1954–1957
- Per Espen Stoknes (born 1967), term/s: 2017–2021
- Johan Stølan (1939–2016), term/s: 1977–1981, 1981–1985 and 1985–1989
- Morten Stordalen (born 1968), term/s: 2005–2009 and 2009–2013
- Thor Støre (1924–2001), term/s: 1969–1973
- Arne Storhaug (born 1950), term/s: 2001–2005 and 2005–2009
- Haakon Storøy (1907–1977)
- André Støylen (born 1968), term/s: 1989–1993
- Morten Strand (born 1947), term/s: 2001–2005 and 2005–2009
- Olav Marensius Strandås (1900–1981), term/s: 1950–1953
- Bjarne Aagaard Strøm (1920–2008), term/s: 1965–1969
- Einar Strøm (born 1945), term/s: 2001–2005
- Frøydis Elisabeth Sund (born 1980), term/s: 2001–2005, 2005–2009 and 2009–2013
- Åslaug Linge Sunde (1917–2006), term/s: 1977–1981
- Kristian Sundtoft (1937–2015), term/s: 1965–1969, 1981–1985 and 1993–1997
- Tine Sundtoft (born 1967)
- Hans Svelland (born 1943), term/s: 1973–1977
- Ruth Svendsen (1915–1998), term/s: 1954–1957, 1958–1961, 1961–1965, 1965–1969, 1969–1973 and 1973–1977
- Sigvald Svendsen (1895–1956), term/s: 1950–1953 and 1954–1957
- Torgeir Svendsen (1910–1981), term/s: 1954–1957 and 1958–1961
- Bente Øyan Sveum (born 1945), term/s: 1989–1993, 1993–1997 and 2001–2005
- Kjell Svindland (born 1933), term/s: 1973–1977, 1977–1981, 1981–1985, 1985–1989 and 1989–1993

== T ==
- Leo Tallaksen, term/s: 1965–1969
- Ole-Anton Teigen (born 1954), term/s: 2001–2005 and 2005–2009
- Wilhelm Thøgersen (1913–2005), term/s: 1958–1961, 1961–1965 and 1965–1969
- Olaf Thommessen (born 1966), term/s: 2005–2009
- Jørgen Olsen Thon (1866–1937)
- Johanna Thorén (1889–1969)
- Geir Thoresen (born 1965), term/s: 1993–1997
- Laila Thorsen (born 1967), term/s: 2009–2013
- Bjarne Eilif Thorvik (1908–1972), term/s: 1954–1957 and 1958–1961
- Gro Hillestad Thune (born 1943), term/s: 1977–1981
- John Thune (born 1948), term/s: 2001–2005, 2005–2009 and 2009–2013
- Nils Thune (1898–1988), term/s: 1950–1953
- Vegard Thune (born 1951), term/s: 1989–1993
- Hanne Thürmer (born 1960)
- Ole Tinghaug (born 1945), term/s: 1989–1993 and 1997–2001
- Arne Tjersland (1924–2015), term/s: 1965–1969, 1969–1973, 1969–1973
- Søren Tjønneland (1868–1954), term/s: 1916–1918
- Niclas Tokerud (born 1990), term/s: 2013–2017
- Per Tønder (1911–2015), term/s: 1954–1957, 1958–1961 and 1961–1965
- Bjarte Tørå (born 1953), term/s: 1981–1985 and 1985–1989
- Egil Toreng (1922–2015), term/s: 1958–1961
- Knut Petter Torgersen (born 1955), term/s: 2005–2009 and 2009–2013
- Rasmus Andreas Torset (1897–1965), term/s: 1958–1961
- Jon Tørset (born 1940), term/s: 1985–1989 and 1997–2001
- Åge Tovan (born 1947), term/s: 1993–1997, 1993–1997 and 2001–2005
- John Marius Trana (1898–1976), term/s: 1954–1957 and 1958–1961
- Johan Trondsen (born 1922), term/s: 1961–1965
- Synnøve Tronsvang (born 1943), term/s: 1981–1985
- Tom Tvedt (born 1968), term/s: 2005–2009

== U ==
- Karl Ugland (1886–1966), term/s: 1950–1953
- Tor Sigbjørn Utsogn (born 1974), term/s: 2009–2013

== V ==
- Jone Vadla (1923–2009)
- Karl Johan Pettersen Vadøy (1878–1965), term/s: 1934–1936, 1937–1945 and 1945–1949
- Arna Vågen (1905–2005), term/s: 1961–1965
- Lene Vågslid (born 1986), term/s: 2009–2013
- Martha Seim Valeur (1923–2016), term/s: 1993–1997
- Ove Vanebo (born 1983), term/s: 2005–2009
- Daniel Steen Varen (1908–1991), term/s: 1969–1973
- Ragnhild Hartmann Varmbo (1886–1982), term/s: 1937–1945 and 1945–1949
- Knut Vartdal (born 1940), term/s: 1973–1977
- Dagfinn Vårvik (born 1924), term/s: 1961–1965
- Bjarne Karsten Vatne (1926–2009), term/s: 1977–1981
- Oddbjørn Vatne (born 1948), term/s: 2001–2005 and 2005–2009
- Line Vennesland (born 1985), term/s: 2009–2013 and 2013–2017
- Jan M. Vevatne (born 1950), term/s: 1997–2001
- Hilde Vogt (born 1945), term/s: 1985–1989 and 1993–1997
- Jan Fredrik Vogt (born 1974), term/s: 2005–2009
- Ole Vollan (1837–1907), term/s: 1904–1906
- Gerd Vollum (1920–2009), term/s: 1973–1977

== W ==
- Hjelm Waage (1866–1947), term/s: 1922–1924
- Roy Waage (born 1963), term/s: 1997–2001
- Ingebjørg Wærstad (born 1926), term/s: 1973–1977
- Elisabeth Walaas (born 1956), term/s: 1989–1993
- Erling Walderhaug (born 1942), term/s: 1989–1993
- Christopher Wand (born 1987), term/s: 2013–2017
- Eyvind W. Wang (born 1942), term/s: 1993–1997
- Signe Weisert (1923–2000), term/s: 1977–1981
- Andreas Wessel (1858–1940), term/s: 1895–1897
- Karl Valdemar Westerlund (1907–1997), term/s: 1965–1969
- Thore Westermoen (born 1949), term/s: 1989–1993, 1997–2001 and 2005–2009
- Lene Westgaard-Halle (born 1979)
- Henriette Westhrin (born 1973), term/s: 1993–1997 and 2001–2005
- Erlend Wiborg (born 1984)
- Birgit Borgersen Wiig (1928–1998)
- Ole Wiig (1923–2014), term/s: 1969–1973
- Lise Wiik (born 1947), term/s: 2001–2005, 2005–2009 and 2013–2017
- Kristian Støback Wilhelmsen (born 1991)
- Ragnvald Winjum (1917–1965), term/s: 1961–1965
- Marvin Wiseth (born 1951), term/s: 1977–1981
- Jens Wisløff (1921–1998), term/s: 1969–1973
- Hennild Wollstadmo (born 1943), term/s: 1981–1985

== Y ==
- Ivar Ytreland (1926–2012), term/s: 1973–1977
