= Østvold =

Østvold is a surname. Notable people with the surname include:

- Benjamin Østvold (born 2001), Norwegian ski jumper
- Line Østvold (1978–2004), Norwegian professional snowboarder
- Marius Østvold (born 1997), retired Norwegian football midfielder
- Per Østvold (born 1949), Norwegian trade unionist and politician
- Thomas Østvold (born 1973), retired Norwegian football defender
