= Per Dahl =

Per Dahl may refer to:

- Per Dahl (musicologist) (born 1953), Norwegian musicologist
- Per Dahl (ice hockey) (1916–1989), Norwegian ice hockey player
- Per Arne Dahl (born 1950), Norwegian author and bishop of Tunsberg
- Per Kristian Dahl (born 1960), Norwegian politician
