= Kolderup =

Kolderup is a surname. Notable people with this surname include:

- Amunda Kolderup (1846–1882), Norwegian opera singer
- Carl Fredrik Kolderup (1869–1942), Norwegian geologist and professor
- Janus Lauritz Andreas Kolderup-Rosenvinge (1792–1850), Danish jurist
- Niels-Henrik Kolderup (1898–1971), Norwegian geologist and politician

== See also ==
- Lauritz Kolderup Rosenvinge (1858–1939), Danish botanist
