= Nordbø =

Nordbø is a surname. Notable people with the surname include:

- Anker Nordbø (1920–1978), Norwegian politician
- Eldrid Nordbø (1942–2026), Norwegian politician
- Inger Nordbø (1915–2004), Danish/Norwegian sports swimmer and diver
- Kurt Nordbø (1931–2009), Norwegian politician
- Rasmus Nordbø (1915–1983), Norwegian politician
- Torolf Nordbø (born 1956), Norwegian musician and comedian
