= Steinsson =

Steinsson is a surname. Notable people with the surname include:

- Grétar Steinsson (born 1982), Icelandic former professional footballer
- Guðmundur Steinsson (born 1960), Icelandic former professional footballer
- Jón Steinsson, Chancellor's Professor of Economics at University of California, Berkeley
- Unnur Steinsson (born 1963), Miss Iceland 1983

== See also ==
- Stensen
- Stenson
- Stensson
- Stinson (disambiguation)
