= Stenersen =

Stenersen may refer to:

- Aina Stenersen (born 1983), Norwegian politician
- Eivind Stenersen Engelstad (1900–1969), Norwegian archaeologist and art historian
- Gudmund Stenersen (1863–1934), Norwegian painter and illustrator
- Martin Stenersen (1879–1968), Norwegian rifle shooter
- Rolf Stenersen (1899–1978), Norwegian athlete, businessman, art collector, writer
- Ruth Stenersen (born 1960), Norwegian politician for the Christian Democratic Party
- Stener Johannes Stenersen (1835–1904), Norwegian veterinarian
- Sverre Stenersen (1926–2005), Norwegian Nordic combined skier

== See also ==
- Margaret Stenersen Elementary School in the Fraser Valley of British Columbia
- Stenersen Museum (Norwegian: Stenersenmuseet), an art museum in Oslo, Norway
- Stensen
- Stenson (disambiguation)
- Stensån
