= Sverre Krogh =

Sverre Krogh may refer to:

- Sverre Krogh (editor) (1883–1957), Norwegian actuary, newspaper editor and politician for the Labour and Communist Labour parties
- Sverre Krogh (politician) (1921–2006), Norwegian farmer, organizational leader and politician for the Centre Party
