= Skilbred =

Skilbred is a surname. Notable people with the surname include:

- Nils Gregoriussen Skilbred (1860–1943), Norwegian politician
- Nils-Olav Skilbred (born 1949), Norwegian politician
