= Gløersen =

Gløersen is a surname. Notable people with the surname include:

- Anders Gløersen (born 1986), Norwegian cross-country skier
- Inger Alver Gløersen (1892–1982), Norwegian writer
- Jacob Gløersen (1852–1912), Norwegian painter
- Kari Gløersen (born 1948), Norwegian politician
