= Apeland =

Apeland is a surname. Notable people with the surname include:

- Åsmund Apeland (1930–2010), Norwegian politician
- Carl Øyvind Apeland (b. 1964), Norwegian musician
- Knut Tore Apeland (b. 1968), Norwegian skier
- Ola S. Apeland (b. 1964), Norwegian politician
- Sigbjørn Apeland (b. 1966), Norwegian musician
