= Lervik (surname) =

Lervik is a Norwegian surname. Notable people with the surname include:

- Andreas M. Lervik (born 1969), Norwegian politician
- Åse Hiorth Lervik (1933–1997), Norwegian literary researcher
- John Markus Lervik (born 1969), Norwegian businessman
- Lars Lervik (born 1971), Norwegian army officer
