= Fimland =

Fimland is a Norwegian surname. Notable people with the surname include:

- Håkon Fimland (1942–2016), Norwegian hurdler and politician
- Kristian Mathias Fimland (1889–1959), Norwegian politician
