= Holen (surname) =

Holen is a surname. Notable people with the surname include:

- Are Holen (born 1945), Norwegian physician and psychiatrist
- Arne Holen (born 1944), Norwegian musicologist
- Bjarne Holen, Norwegian politician
- Ida Marie Holen (born 1958), Norwegian politician
- Lars Holen (1912–1994), Norwegian politician
