= Ski Mask =

A ski mask, or balaclava, is a head and face covering.

Ski Mask may refer to:

- Ski Mask the Slump God (born 1996), American rapper and songwriter
- Ski Mask, 2013 album by Islands

== See also ==
- Ski (disambiguation)
- Mask (disambiguation)
- Skee Mask, German electronic music producer
- Ski Masked Bandit (Michael H. Kenyon, born c.1944), American criminal
- "Ski Mask Way", 2005 song by 50 Cent from the album The Massacre
