= Bojanowski =

Bojanowski is a Polish language surname.

== People with the surname ==
- Edmund Bojanowski (1814–1871), Polish religious figure
- Marion Gunstveit Bojanowski (born 1966), Norwegian politician
- Tina Bojanowski (born 1964), American politician

== See also ==
- Bokanowski
