= Prestrud =

Prestrud is a surname. Notable people with the surname include:

- Kari Mette Prestrud (born 1977), Norwegian politician
- Kristian Prestrud (1881–1927), Norwegian naval officer and polar explorer

== See also ==
- Mount Prestrud, Antarctic peak
- Prestrud Inlet, in Antarctica
