= Thøgersen =

Thøgersen is a Danish and Norwegian surname. Notable people with the surname include:

- Daniel Thøgersen (born 2000), Danish footballer
- Frederikke Thøgersen (born 1995), Danish professional football player
- Sofia Thøgersen (born 2005), Danish runner
- Svein Thøgersen (born 1946), retired Norwegian rower
- Thomas Thøgersen (born 1968), Danish former professional footballer
- Thyge Thøgersen (1926–2016), Danish long-distance runner
- Wilhelm Thøgersen (1913–2005), Norwegian politician for the Labour Party
