= Solfrid =

Solfrid is a given name. Notable people with the name include:

- Solfrid Andersen (born 1982), Norwegian footballer
- Solfrid Heier (born 1945), Norwegian actress
- Solfrid Johansen (born 1956), Norwegian sport rower
- Solfrid Koanda (born 1998), Norwegian weightlifter
- Solfrid Lerbrekk (born 1990), Norwegian politician
- Solfrid Nilsen (born 1937), Norwegian politician
- Solfrid Sivertsen (born 1947), Norwegian librarian
