= Richard Edvardsen =

Norwegian politician (born 1936)

Richard Edvardsen (born 17 November 1936) is a Norwegian politician for the Socialist Left Party.

He served as a deputy representative to the Norwegian Parliament from Troms from 1993 to 1997.

He is a former member of the Norwegian Consumer Council.

== See also ==
- List of deputy members of the Storting
