= Ski (disambiguation) =

A ski is a narrow strip of semi-rigid material worn underfoot to glide over snow.

Ski may also refer to:

== Recreational activity ==
- Skiing, the use of skis to glide on snow
- Ski (driving stunt), driving a car balanced on two wheels
- Water skiing, skiing on water, pulled by a boat

== Arts and entertainment ==
- "Ski" (Future song), 2024
- Ski (Young Stoner Life, Young Thug and Gunna song), 2021
- Ski, a magazine published by Outside

== Food and drink ==
- Ski (drink), a citrus soda
- Ski Dairy, a British dairy and yogurt brand owned by Nestle

== People ==
- -ski, a common ending of Polish surnames
- Frank Ski (born 1964), American DJ, journalist and philanthropist
- Martin Ski (1912–1983), Norwegian politician
- Ski Beatz (David Anthony Willis), American record producer
- Ski Melillo (Oscar Donald Melillo, 1899–1963), American baseball player

== Places ==
- Ski, Norway, a place in Akershus county
- Skipton railway station, England, station code SKI
- Skikda Airport, Algeria, IATA code SKI

== Other uses ==
- SKI combinator calculus, a combinatory logic system and a computational system
- SKI protein, a nuclear proto-oncogene
- "Spending the Kids' Inheritance", referring to older people's economic consumption

== See also ==
- Surf ski, a type of kayak
