= Bokanowski =

Bokanowski is a Polish surname. People with this name include:

- Gilbert Bokanowski (1920–1975), French film actor and film producer
- Maurice Bokanowski (1879–1928), French lawyer and left-wing Republican politician
- Michel Maurice-Bokanowski (1912– 2005), French politician (son of Maurice Bokanowski)
- Michèle Bokanowski (born 1943), French composer
- Patrick Bokanowski (born 1943), French filmmaker

== See also ==
- Bojanowski
