= Norwegian Registration Authority for Health Personnel =

Norwegian Registration Authority for Health Personnel (Norwegian: Statens autorisasjonskontor for helsepersonell, SAK (until 2012 SAFH)) is the authority that licenses health care personnel who fulfill requirements laid down in The Health Personnel Act, Chapter 9.

Its director of administration (Liv Løberg) vacated her position on 24 June 2010 after admitting to falsifying three of the certificates of education that had been part of her employment application at SAFH.
