= Jon Jæger Gåsvatn =

Norwegian politician (born 1954)

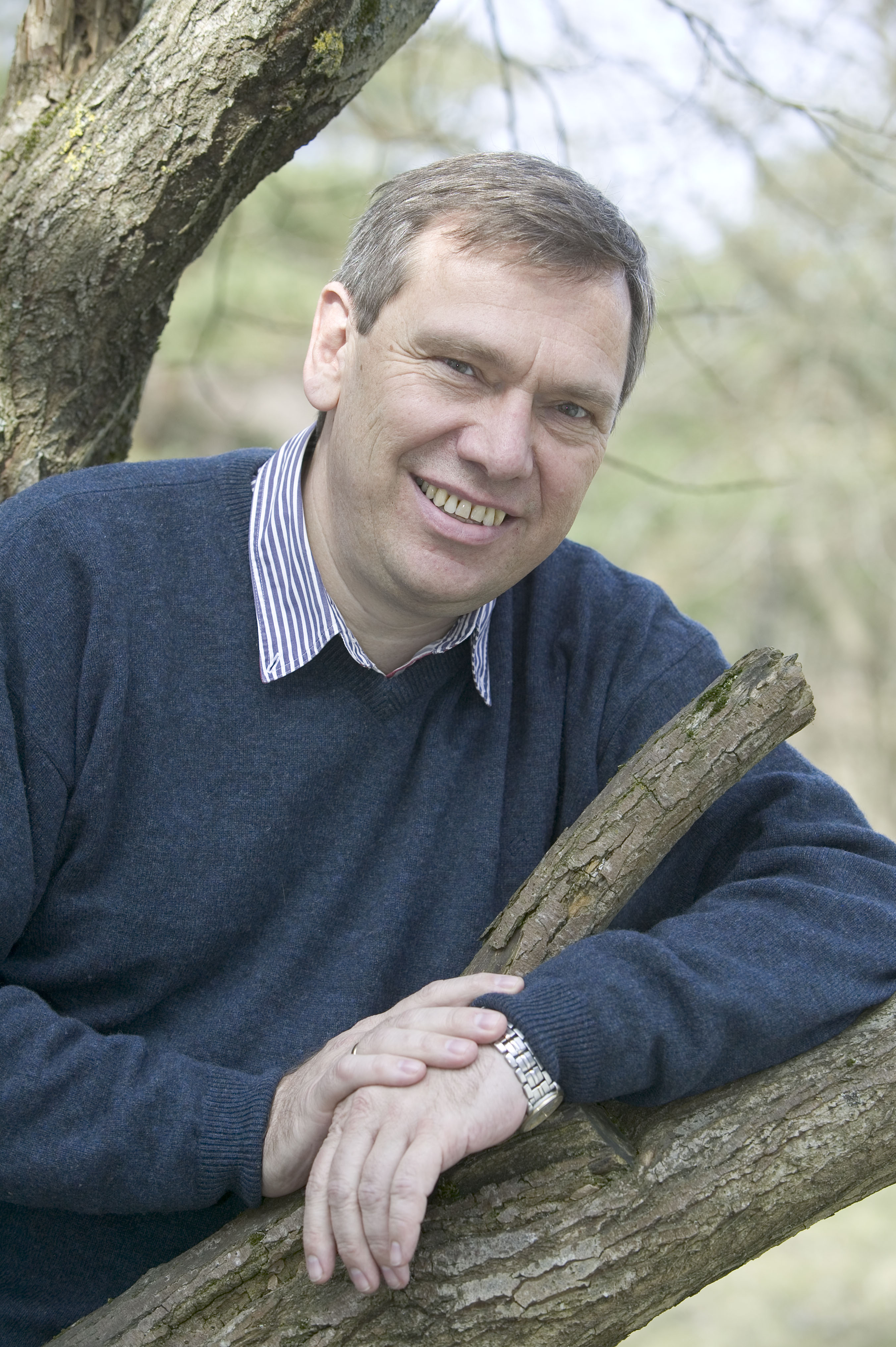
Jon Jæger Gåsvatn

Jon Jæger Gåsvatn (born 19 June 1954 in Frogn) is a Norwegian politician for the Progress Party.

He was elected to the Norwegian Parliament from Østfold in 2005. He had previously served in the position of deputy representative during the term 1993–1997.

Gåsvatn held various positions in Sarpsborg municipal council from 1991 to 2001. From 1999 to 2007 he was also a member of Østfold county councilcounty council.

He is married to Monica Gåsvatn.
