= Alfred Theodor Michelsen =

Norwegian farmer and politician

Alfred Theodor Michelsen (17 December 1874 – 12 March 1941) was a Norwegian farmer and politician for the Liberal Left Party.

He was born in Bergen, took middle school and the Jønsberg School of Agriculture. He lived in the United States for some years, working on a farm and in a bank. From 1901 he was a farmer at Mork in Eidsvoll.

He was a member of Eidsvoll municipal council, and chaired the local dairy and electricity works. He was elected as a deputy representative to the Parliament of Norway from Akershus in 1927, and served through one term.
