= Hulda Holtvedt =

Norwegian Green politician

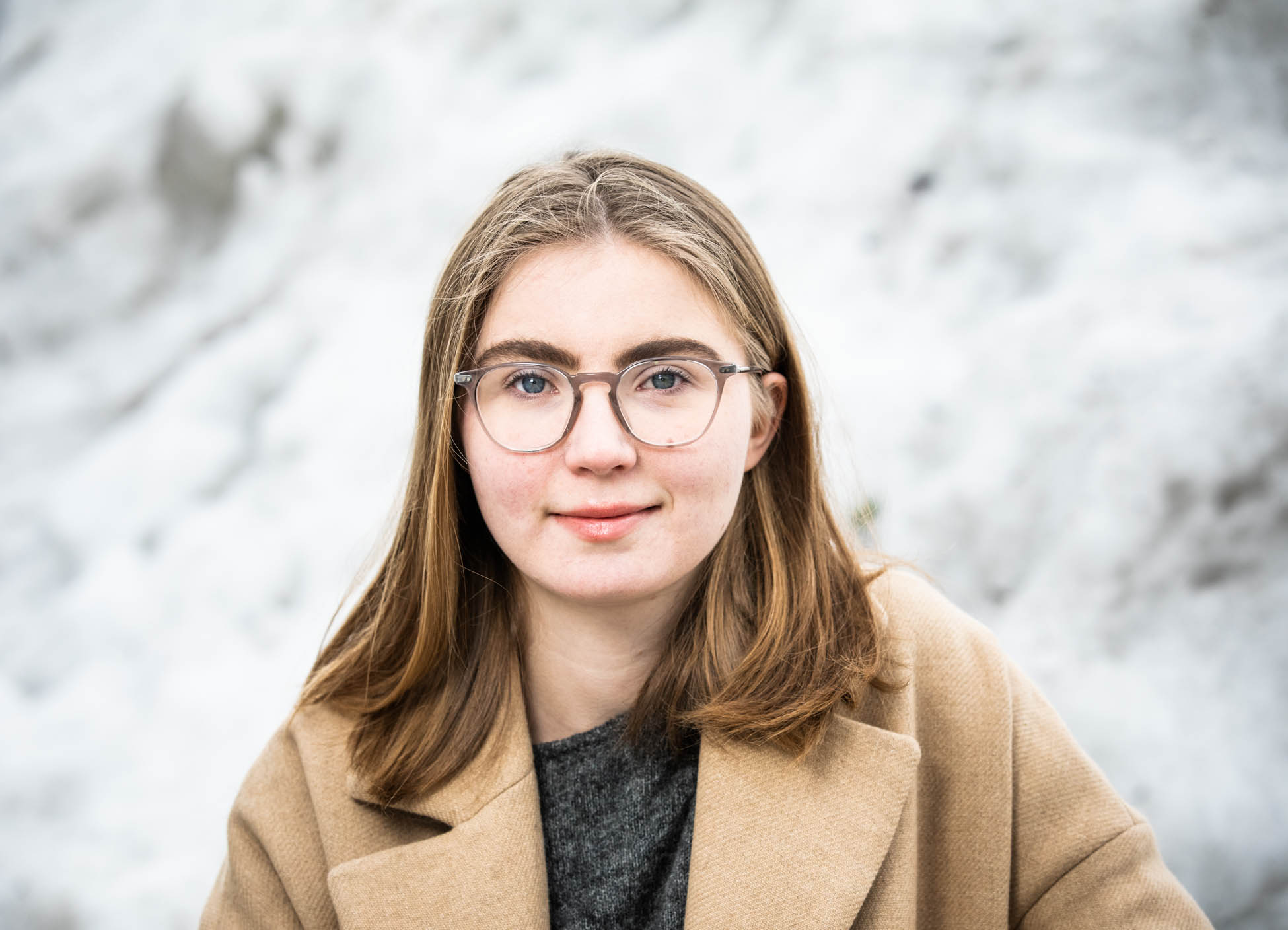
- Holtvedt in 2019

Deputy Representative No. 3 for Oslo to the Storting
- In office 2017–2021

Personal details
- Born: June 1, 1999 (age 26)
- Party: Norwegian Green Party

Hulda Holtvedt (born 1 June 1999) is a Norwegian Green Party politician. She was spokesperson for Grønn Ungdom from 2017 to 2021, the Green Party's youth organization.

== Biography ==
=== Early life ===
Holtvedt was born on 1 June 1999. She grew up in Oslo and attended Oslo Cathedral School which she dropped out of. The year before she dropped out of secondary school, she was admitted to UWC Atlantic College in Wales, but opted out for Grønn Ungdom.

=== Political career ===
She was Deputy Representative No. 3 for Oslo to the Storting from 2017 to 2021. In 2019, she was elected to Oslo City Council, where she currently sits on the health and social welfare committee.

She was spokesperson for Grønn Ungdom from 2017 to 2021.

== Political opinions ==
Holtvedt supports Norway joining the EU, even while EU membership in Norway has always been strongly rejected by left-wing parties. She supports this because she thinks that the climate crisis is an international issue.
