= Marius Østvold =

Norwegian footballer (born 1997)

Personal information
- Full name: Marius Østvold
- Date of birth: 4 November 1997 (age 28)
- Height: 1.79 m (5 ft 10 in)
- Position: Midfielder

Youth career
- Porsgrunn
- 2011–2015: Stabæk

Senior career*
| Years | Team | Apps | (Gls) |
| 2016–2017 | Stabæk | 1 | (0) |
| 2018 | Lyn | 4 | (0) |

International career
| 2015 | Norway u-18 | 4 | |
- * Club domestic league appearances and goals as of 10 December 2019

Marius Østvold (born 4 November 1997) is a retired Norwegian football midfielder.

He hails from Porsgrunn, but joined Stabæk as a youth player and also featured for Norway internationally. He made his Norwegian Premier League debut in May 2016 against IK Start, but tore a cruciate ligament in June 2016. A year later he faced another surgery, this time in both shins. He never returned to Stabæk's first team, and ahead of the 2018 season he trialled with Lyn. After four matches for Lyn he retired because of the injuries.

Former footballer Thomas Østvold is his uncle.
