= Ruth Svendsen =

Norwegian politician

Ruth Svendsen (23 May 1915 – 10 January 1998) was a Norwegian trade unionist and politician for the Labour Party.

She was born in Skien as a daughter of electrician Olaf Svendsen (1890–1978) and housewife Gunda Kristine Hagen (1885–1965). After commerce school and middle school she worked as an office clerk in Porsgrunn. She was organized in the Union of Employees in Commerce and Offices, and was a member of the control committee from 1948 to 1952 and the national board from 1952 to 1975. During the same period she was also a supervisory council member of the Norwegian Confederation of Trade Unions.

She was a member of Porsgrunn city council from 1951 to 1975. From 1975 to 1979 she was a member of Telemark county council. She served as a deputy representative to the Parliament of Norway from Telemark during the terms 1954–1957, 1958–1961, 1961–1965, 1965–1969, 1969–1973 and 1973–1977. In total she met during 138 days of parliamentary session.

From 1959 to 1961 she was a national board member of the Labour Party, and from 1971 to 1977 she was a board member of Porsgrunn Lutheran Hospital.
