= Tor Sigbjørn Utsogn =

Norwegian politician (born 1974)

Tor Sigbjørn Utsogn (born 1 April 1974) is a Norwegian politician for the Progress Party.

He served as a deputy representative to the Parliament of Norway from Vest-Agder during the term 2009–2013. He met during 213 days of parliamentary session. Locally he has been a member of Kristiansand city council.
