= Peter Sigurd Mjør =

Norwegian politician

Peter Sigurd Mjør (30 September 1926 – 18 July 1975) was a Norwegian politician for the Conservative Party.

He served as a deputy representative to the Parliament of Norway from Oppland during the term 1958–1961, 1965–1969 and 1973–1977. In total he met during 5 days of parliamentary session.
