= O. Normann Sand =

Norwegian politician (1921–1974)

Oscar Normann Sand (11 August 1921 – 14 August 1974) is a Norwegian politician for the Labour Party.

He served as a deputy representative to the Norwegian Parliament from Akershus during the term 1965–1969.

On the local level, Sand was mayor of Oppegård municipality from 1956 to 1960.
