= Siri Engesæth =

Norwegian politician (born 1969)

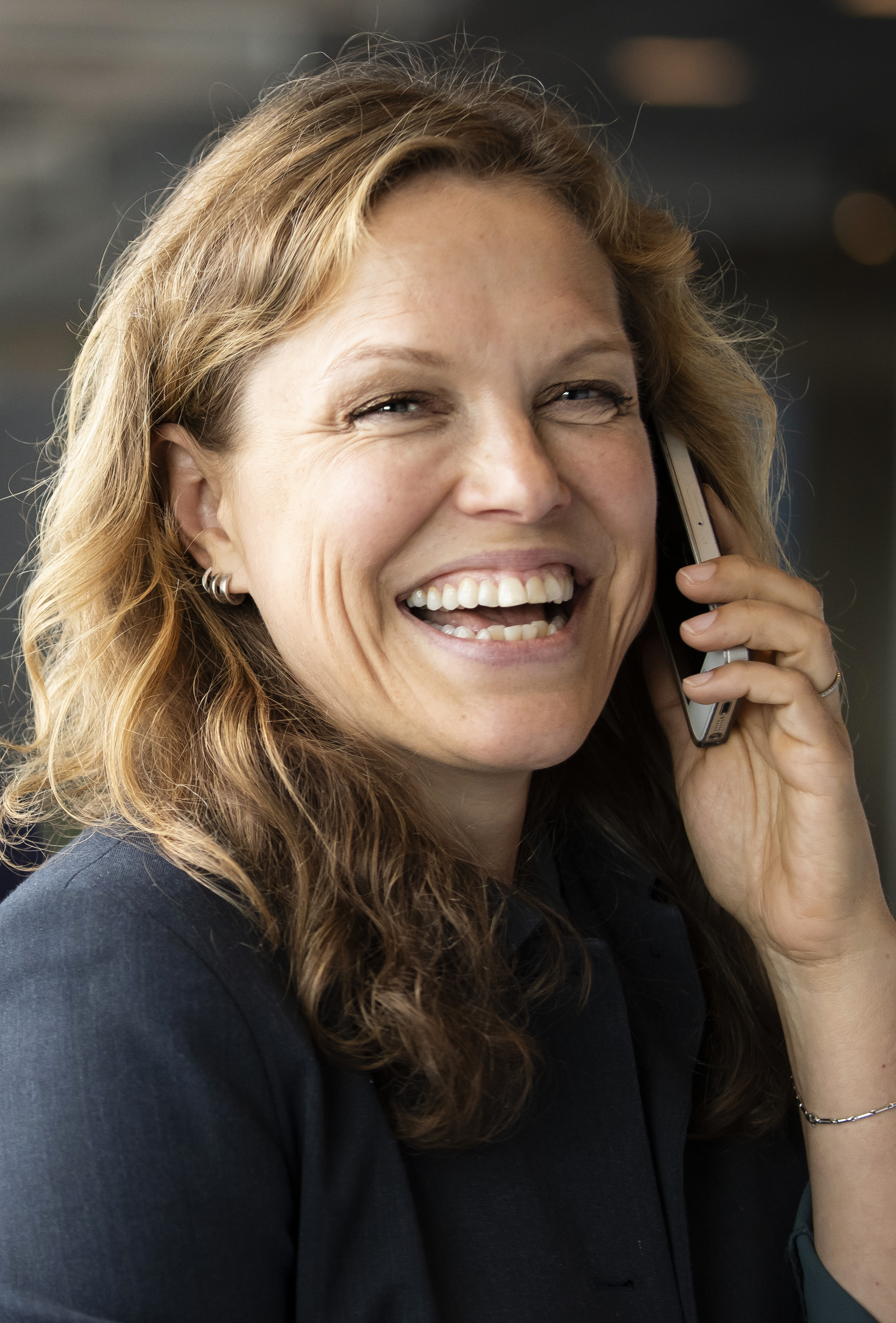
Siri Engesaeth (cropped)

Siri Engesæth (born 20 May 1969) is a Norwegian businesswoman and politician for the Liberal Party.

She served as a deputy representative to the Parliament of Norway from Akershus during the term 2013–2017. She has been a member of Bærum municipal council and Akershus county council. She has been the general director of several companies as well as NGO's such as Bellona and the European umbrella organisation Seas at risk.
