= Hans Hanssen =

Norwegian politician (1853–1923)

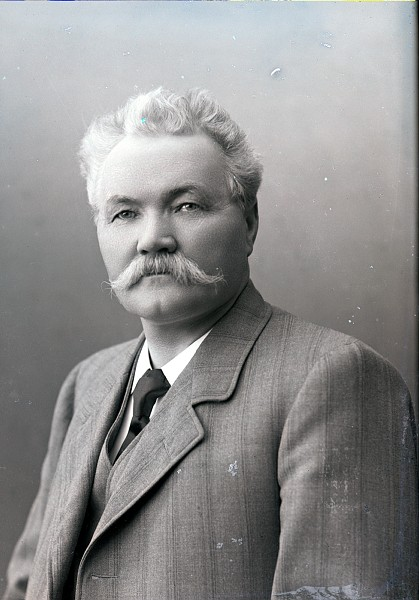
A portrait of Hans Hanssen

Hans Hanssen (23 January 1853 – 26 May 1923) was a Norwegian politician for the Conservative Party and later the Liberal Left Party.

He was born at Ustmyr in Leinstrand Municipality as a son of farmers Hans Arnesen Ustmyr og Karen Lund. He inherited the family farm, but was also a merchant in Trondhjem from the 1870s. From 1898 to 1908 he was the bank director of Arbeiderforeningens spareskillingsbank. He was a member of city council of Trondheim Municipality from 1897 to 1903 and 1907 to 1910. He served as a deputy representative to the parliament of Norway from the constituency Bratøren og Ilen during the terms 1907–1909 and 1910–1912.
