= Elisabeth Fanghol =

Norwegian politician (born 1983)

Elisabeth Fanghol (born 11 June 1983) is a Norwegian politician for the Labour Party.

She was elected as deputy representative to the Parliament of Norway from Akershus for the term 2017–2021. In total she met during 13 days of parliamentary session.
