= Vegard Thune =

Norwegian politician (born 1951)

Vegard Thune (born 26 August 1951) is a Norwegian politician for the Conservative Party.

He served as a deputy representative to the Norwegian Parliament from Oppland during the term 1989–1993. In total he met during 24 days of parliamentary session.
