= Olga Nybø =

Norwegian politician (1930–2011)

Olga Nybø (6 December 1930 – 10 November 2011) was a Norwegian politician for the Christian Democratic Party.

Nybø served as a deputy representative to the Parliament of Norway from Rogaland during the term 1981–1985. In total she met during 26 days of parliamentary session. She died on 10 November 2011, at the age of 80.
