= Hjelm Waage =

Norwegian politician

Georg Henrik Hjelm Waage (2 February 1866 – 12 March 1947) was a Norwegian ship-owner and politician for the Conservative Party.

He was born in Kopervik to Asbjørn Andreas Waage (1828–1904) and Jensine C. Coucheron Grip (1829–1905). He worked in his father's company to 1886, then in the postal service from 1886 to 1898. In 1899 he became a co-owner in the shipping company Hagbart Waages Rederi, together with his brother. When the brother died in 1909, Hjelm Waage became the sole owner and changed the company name to Waages Rederi. His nephew became a co-owner in 1937.

Waage was a member of Kristiania city council from 1919 to 1922, and was a deputy representative to the Parliament of Norway during the term 1922–1924. He was also a board member of the Norwegian Shipowners' Association from 1915 to 1924. He died in 1947.
