= Greta Johanne Solfall =

Norwegian politician

Greta Johanne Solfall (born 25 June 1959) is a Norwegian politician for the Progress Party.

She served as a deputy representative to the Parliament of Norway from Nordland during the terms 2009–2013 and 2013–2017. She resides in Glomfjord and has been the deputy mayor of Meløy Municipality since 2011.
