= Young Greens of Norway =

Youth league of the Norwegian Green Party

Young Greens of Norway Grønn Ungdom Grøn Ungdom Ruoná Nuorat Vihriset Nuoret
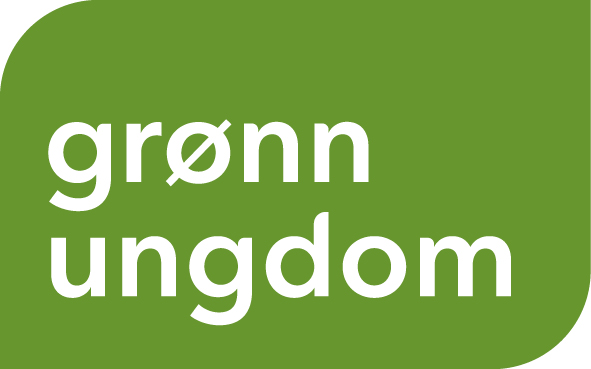
- Secretary General: Isa Isene
- Spokesperson: Tobias Stokkeland, Margit Martinsen
- Founded: 1996
- Headquarters: Oslo, Norway
- Membership: 780 (2023)
- Ideology: Green politics
- Colours: Green
- Mother party: Green Party
- International affiliation: Global Young Greens
- European affiliation: Federation of Young European Greens
- Nordic affiliation: Grön Ungdom i Norden (GUN)
- Website: www.gronnungdom.no

Young Greens of Norway (Bokmål: Grønn Ungdom, Nynorsk: Grøn Ungdom, Northern Sami: Ruoná Nuorat, Kven: Vihriset Nuoret or GU) is the youth league of the Norwegian Green Party. The organization was founded in 1996, and its current spokespeople (2023) are Tobias Stokkeland (since 2021) and Margit Martinsen (since 2022). The Young Greens works to promote green ideology, its mother party's political program, and youths' engagement in politics. The co-spokespersons of Young Greens of Norway are Anna Serafima Svendsen Kvam from Oslo and Ola Eian from Osen i Sør-Trøndelag. Young Greens of Norway has 780 (2022) members and 19 local groups, one in each county.

== Politics ==
As the only political youth organization in Norway, the Young Greens follows the political platform of its mother party, the Green Party, but can also adapt independent resolutions. One of the organization's prioritized issues is to change Norwegian climate politics, and phase out the Norwegian oil industry within 20 years.

The organization is working for a new direction in climate politics which amongst other things means that they will change the energy sector, stop any search for new oil and gas fields and phase out the Norwegian oil industry in 20 years. They also want a new tax system to reduce personal consumption and to make the market easier for small businesses.

== Organization ==
The Young Greens of Norway's leadership structure is unique among political youth organizations in Norway, in having two spokespeople instead of a single leader to promote the organization.

The current spokespeople are Ola Eian and Anna Kvam. The secretary general is Isa Isene, and international secretary is John Slinning Jannesson.

The Norwegian Young Greens is a member organization of the Federation of Young European Greens and the Global Young Greens.

Young Greens of Norway is represented on all levels in our mother party. The yearly General Assembly is the highest level of the organization, and the executive committee and the national board is the highest levels in between GAs. The national board has one member from each county, and meets four times a year. The daily tasks in the organization is done by the executive committee, the general secretary and the two spokespersons.

== See also ==
- Nature and Youth
