= Andreas J. Hemma =

Norwegian politician

Andreas Johannesen Hemma (31 October 1866 – 6 August 1950) was a Norwegian farmer and politician.

He was born at Hemma in Brøttum as a son of farmers Johannes Larsen Hemma (1831–1875) and Kristine Biskopaasen (1836–1914). He took basic education, worked three years within commerce in Kristiania, then started working at the family farm which he inherited in 1893. He was elected to the municipal council for Ringsaker Municipality in 1898 and served on it for twenty years. He was also a member of the local school board.

He participated in his first parliamentary election in 1906, and was elected as a deputy representative to the Parliament of Norway for the Coalition Party, from the constituency Nordre Hedemarken. His running mate E. Svartshoel was not elected, so that Hemma served as a deputy for Liberal Wollert Konow (H). In the 1909 election he narrowly failed re-election as deputy. The Coalition Party was no more, but Hemma had joined the Liberal Left Party. Svartshoel had joined the Conservative Party, and they stood against Konow. Svartshoel and Hemma lost the first round; having carried Furnes Municipality and Nes Municipality but lost Ringsaker Municipality. There was a second round of voting, but before it took place, Svartshoel died and Konow was allowed to run unopposed. In the 1912 election Hemma stood as deputy candidate, and won the first voting round together with his running mate Axel Krogvig. In the second round however, Konow won and carried Nordre Hedemarken. From 1915 to 1918 Hemma was a central board member of the Liberal Left Party.

In the 1918 election things had turned around. Wollert Konow was fielded by the Norwegian Agrarian Association with the backing from the Liberal Left and Conservative parties. Hemma stood as his deputy, and they won comfortably. In 1921 there was a new election system with ballot lists; Hemma stood as seventh ballot candidate for the Agrarian Party but without chance of election. In 1924 he was the tenth candidate, in 1927 he was the fourth candidate and was elected as second deputy, and met for some months in Parliament in 1928 and 1930. In 1930 he was the eleventh candidate. He died in August 1950.
