= Rune Selj =

Norwegian politician (born 1952)

Rune Selj (born 8 June 1952) is a Norwegian politician for the Conservative Party.

He served as a deputy representative to the Norwegian Parliament from Oppland during the term from 1981 to 1985. In total he met during 8 days of parliamentary session.
