= Carl Christian Bonnevie =

Norwegian physician and politician

Carl Christian August Jacob Bonnevie (5 August 1849 – 19 December 1917) was a Norwegian physician and a politician.

== Biography ==
He was born in Kristiansund as a son of physician Nils Emanuel Andreas Bonnevie and Augusta Lorentzen. He finished his secondary education in 1866 and graduated with the cand.med. degree in 1873. He settled in Drammen, from 1873 a physician in the private sector, from 1897 as city physician (stadsfysikus). He was a board member of the Norwegian Medical Association and Den norske nationalforening mot tuberkulose.

He was elected to the city council of Drammen in 1895, and served as mayor from 1898 to 1901. He was elected as a deputy representative to the Parliament of Norway in the 1912 and the 1915 election, from the constituency Bragernes.

He died in 1917.

Political offices
| Preceded by Hans Hansen | Mayor of Drammen; 1898–1901 | Succeeded by Hans Severin Fürst |
