= Helen Fløisand =

Norwegian politician (born 1952)

Helen Nordeide Fløisand (born 25 October 1952) is a Norwegian politician for the Christian Democratic Party.

In 1999 Fløisand was elected deputy county mayor (fylkesvaraordfører) of Hordaland, succeeding Conservative Øyvind Halleraker. Another Conservative Tom-Christer Nilsen replaced Fløisand following the 2003 election.

She served as a deputy representative to the Norwegian Parliament from Hordaland during the terms 1993–1997 and 1997–2001.
