= Per M. Goverud =

Norwegian politician

Per M. Goverud (1 October 1905 – 10 September 1976) was a Norwegian politician for the Centre Party.

He served as a deputy representative to the Parliament of Norway from Vestfold during the term 1958–1961. In total he met during 26 days of parliamentary session. He hailed from Hof.
