= Halvor Moxnes Landsem =

Norwegian politician (1913–1977)

Halvor Moxnes Landsem (4 March 1913 – 6 August 1977) was a Norwegian politician for the Conservative Party.

He served as a deputy representative to the Parliament of Norway from Bergen during the terms 1954–1957 and 1958–1961. In total he met during 56 days of parliamentary session.
