= Ole Kristian Kjølholdt =

Norwegian politician (born 1950)

Ole Kristian Kjølholdt (born 8 September 1950) is a Norwegian politician for the Conservative Party.

He served as a deputy representative to the Parliament of Norway from Østfold during the term 1997–2001. In total he met during 14 days of parliamentary session. Locally, he served as the mayor of Hvaler from 1991 to 1999.
