= Carl Fredrik Kolderup =

Norwegian geologist and professor

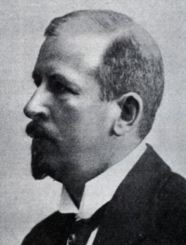
- Born: 6 December 1869; Bergen, Norway
- Died: 1 November 1942 (aged 72); Bergen, Norway
- Education: University of Oslo
- Occupation: Geologist
- Organization(s): University of Bergen; Bergen Museum
- Spouse: Kitty Pedersen
- Children: Niels-Henrik Kolderup

Carl Fredrik Kolderup (6 December 1869 – 1 November 1942) was a Norwegian geologist. He was a professor at the University of Bergen and curator at Bergen Museum.

== Biography ==
He was born in Bergen, Norway. He was as a son of tailor Niels Chrispinus Kolderup and Rasmine Margrethe Olsen. He was the father of geologist and politician Niels-Henrik Kolderup.

He studied under W. C. Brøgger (1851–1940) at the Royal Frederik University (now University of Oslo) earning a Master's degree in geology in 1892. He earned a dr.philos.from the University of Bergen in 1908. From 1898 he was a research fellow at the Bergen Museum and was also museum director from 1914 to 1938. He became a lecturer in 1904 and from 1914 was a professor at the University of Bergen.

Kolderup did pioneering works on the geology of Western Norway, and he founded the department of mineralogy and geology at Bergen Museum. He was also engaged in organizational work and politics, serving on the Bergen city council and acting as the city's deputy mayor.
