= Frøydis Elisabeth Sund =

Norwegian politician (born 1980)

Frøydis Elisabeth Sund (born 18 May 1980) is a Norwegian politician for the Socialist Left Party.

She served as a deputy representative to the Parliament of Norway from Hedmark during the terms 2001–2005, 2005–2009 and 2009–2013.

She has been a member of Hamar city council.
