= Sylvi Bratten =

Norwegian politician

Sylvi Annie Bratten (born 17 June 1973 in Tromsø) is a Norwegian politician representing the Socialist Left Party.

She served as a deputy representative to the Norwegian Parliament from Troms during the term 1993–1997. She later enrolled at the University of Oslo to study political science and Arabic language.

Bratten started her political career as a secretary and advisor for the Socialist Left Party parliamentary group, and was deputy leader of the party chapter in Oslo. By fall 2005 she was a consultant at Hill & Knowlton's Oslo office. In January 2006 she was appointed political advisor to the Minister of Finance.
