= Hanne Thürmer =

Norwegian physician and politician

Hanne Thürmer (born 6 September 1960) is a Norwegian physician and politician for the Centre Party. She resigned her membership from the Christian Democratic Party at the start of 2019, citing the party's negotiation with the Progress Party to form a coalition government as her main reason.

She hails from Notodden in Telemark county, and works as a chief physician at Sykehuset Telemark. In 2009, she became a central board member of the Christian Democratic Party. In the 2009, 2013 and 2017 elections, she was elected as a deputy representative to the Parliament of Norway from Telemark.
