= Kjell Håvard Jensen =

Norwegian politician (born 1958)

Kjell Håvard Jensen (born 3 June 1958) is a Norwegian politician for the Progress Party.

He served as a deputy representative to the Parliament of Norway from Østfold during the term 2013–2017. In total he met during 39 days of parliamentary session. Locally, he served as the mayor of Hobøl from 2007 to 2011.
