= Olav G. Kirkeluten =

Norwegian politician

Olav Guttormson Kirkeluten (6 January 1904 – 24 June 1973) was a Norwegian politician for the Conservative Party.

He served as a deputy representative to the Parliament of Norway from Buskerud during the term 1954–1957. In total he met during 10 days of parliamentary session.
