= Anne Sofie Berge =

Norwegian politician (born 1937)

Anne Sofie Berge (born 16 July 1937) is a Norwegian politician for the Christian Democratic Party.

She served as a deputy representative to the Norwegian Parliament from Rogaland during the term 1997–2001. In total she met during 6 days of parliamentary session.
