= Jan Fredrik Vogt =

Norwegian politician (born 1974)

Jan Fredrik Vogt (born 18 February 1974) is a Norwegian politician for the Progress Party.

He served as a deputy representative to the Norwegian Parliament from Vestfold during the term 2005–2009.

He hails from Sande, Vestfold.

== See also ==
- Politics of Norway
