= John Toralf Steffensen =

Norwegian politician

John Toralf Steffensen (22 June 1919 – 14 November 1996) was a Norwegian politician for the Labour Party.

He served as a deputy representative to the Parliament of Norway from Troms during the term 1973–1977. In total he met during 4 days of parliamentary session.
