= Jønsberg Upper Secondary School =

Upper secondary school in Stange

Coordinates: 60°45′04″N 11°12′33″E

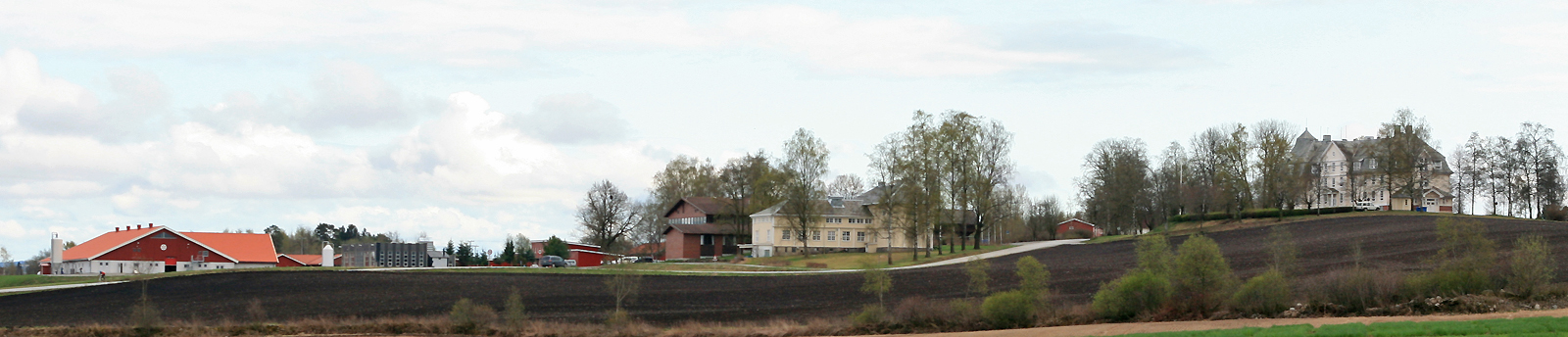
Jønsberg.

Jønsberg Upper Secondary School (Norwegian: Jønsberg videregående skole) is an upper secondary school in Stange Municipality in Innlandet county, Norway.

It was established as Jønsberg School of Agriculture in 1847, and is the oldest school of agriculture still in existence in Norway. The current name stems from 2008.
