= Kristian Støback Wilhelmsen =

Norwegian politician (born 1991)

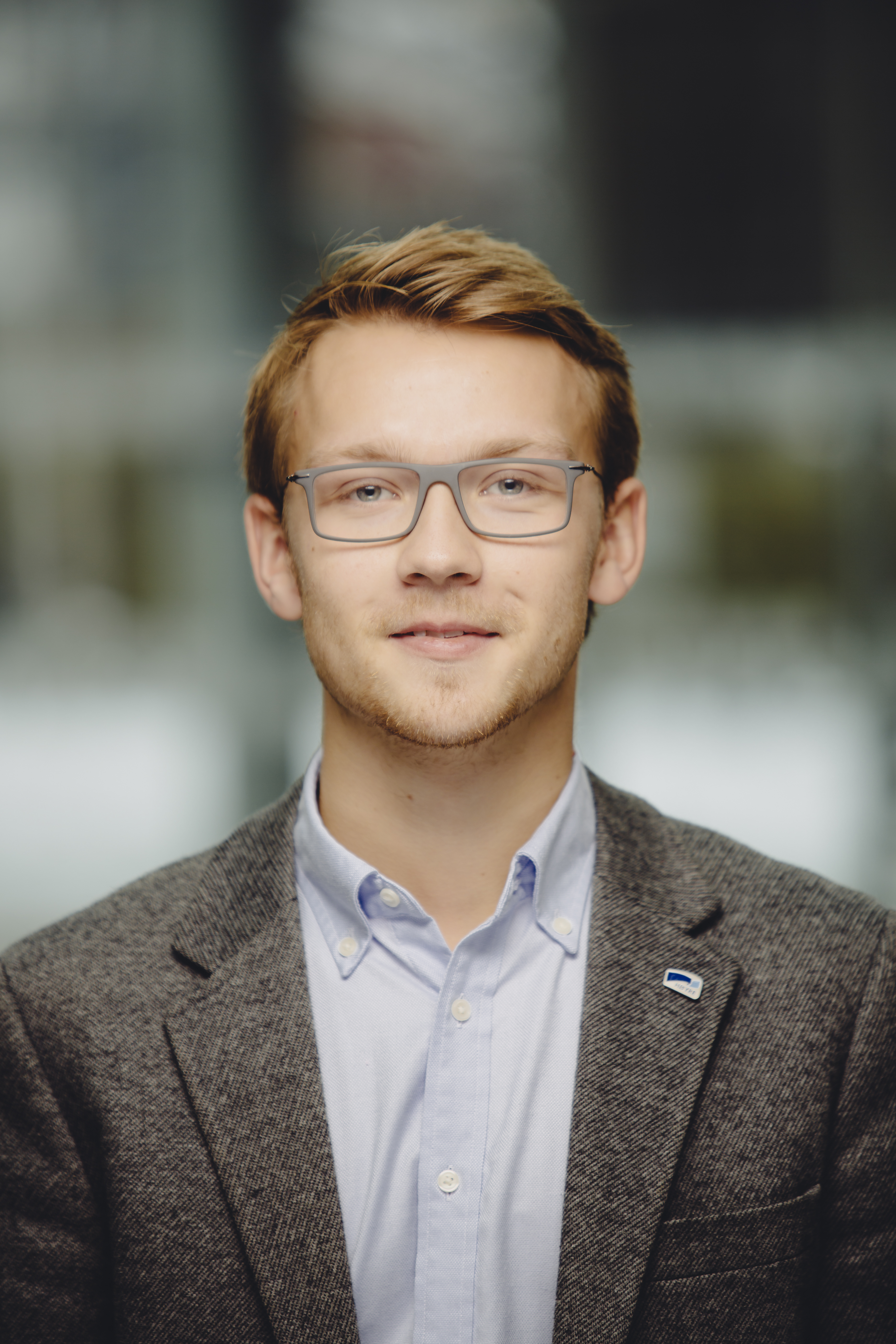
Kristian Støback Wilhelmsen

Kristian Støback Wilhelmsen (born 27 April 1991) is a Norwegian politician for the Conservative Party.

In the 2011 election he was elected to Tromsø city council. In the 2013 election he was elected as a deputy representative to the Parliament of Norway from Troms. For the 2015 local election he headed the Conservative Party ballot in Tromsø, fielding as their mayoral candidate.
