= Signe Weisert =

Norwegian politician (1923–2000)

- Born: 23 May 1923
- Died: 15 August 2000 (aged 77)
- Occupation: Norwegian politician
- Political party: Høyre

Signe Weisert (23 May 1923 – 15 August 2000) was a Norwegian politician for the Conservative Party.

She served as a deputy representative to the Parliament of Norway from Oppland during the term 1977–1981. In total she met during 39 days of parliamentary session.
