= Dagmar Sandvig =

Norwegian politician

Dagmar Sandvig (8 July 1921 – 1 November 1989) was a Norwegian politician for the Conservative Party.

She served as a deputy representative to the Parliament of Norway from Møre og Romsdal during the terms 1954–1957 and 1969–1973. In total, she met during 30 days of parliamentary session.
