= Per Dahl (musicologist) =

Norwegian musicologist

Per Dahl (born 1952) is a Norwegian musicologist, associate professor at the University of Stavanger and former rector of the university's predecessor, Stavanger University College. As rector, he was instrumental in the efforts to achieve full university status, and he signed the successful application to the government in 2003.

He was employed at Stavanger Conservatory, one of the predecessor institutions to the University of Stavanger, in 1979. In 1988, he was promoted to associate professor. He was the first to obtain the Dr. Philos. (Habilitation) degree at the University of Stavanger in 2006, with his study on Edvard Grieg's Opus 5 No 3, Jeg elsker Dig.
