= Jorid Holstad Nordmelan =

Norwegian politician (born 1991)

Jorid Juliussen Nordmelan, born Jorid Holstad Nordmelan, (born 17 January 1991) is a Norwegian politician for the Labour Party. She is currently working as a political adviser for the Norwegian Minister for Petroleum and Energy, Terje Aasland.

Previously she worked as a political adviser to the Labour Party deputy leader Hadia Tajik.

In the 2013 election she was elected as a deputy representative to the Parliament of Norway from Nord-Trøndelag. She kept her position after the 2017 election. She was a member of Nord-Trøndelag county assembly since the local elections in 2015 until the merging of Nord and Sør (North and South) Trøndelag as of January 1, 2018.

She was also a member of the municipal council of Namsos Municipality. She worked shortly for the lobby firm First House.
