= Camilla Mollatt =

Norwegian politician (born 1971)

Camilla Mollatt (born 17 November 1971) is a Norwegian politician for the Progress Party.

She served as a deputy representative to the Parliament of Norway from Akershus during the term 2013–2017. She hails from Oppegård.
