= Olav Lofthaug =

Norwegian politician

Olav Lofthaug (9 July 1909 – 20 August 1990) was a Norwegian horticulturalist and politician for the Christian Democratic Party.

He was born in Sannikedal as a son of industrial laborer Kristoffer Lofthaug (1864–1946) and housewife Johanne Ødefjeld (1872–1957). He took a horticultural education, ending in a stay at the Norwegian College of Agriculture from 1933 to 1936. Lofthaug married Tonnie Jensen from Vennesla Municipality (1913-1994) in 1939. Together they had three children. He was a consultant between 1936 and 1939, teacher at Tomb agricultural school from 1939 to 1946 and headmaster at Gjennestad Gardener School from 1946 to 1976. In 1976 he received the King's Medal of Merit in gold.

Lofthaug was a member of the municipal council of Stokke Municipality from 1955 to 1967. He served as a deputy representative to the Parliament of Norway from Vestfold during the terms 1969–1973 and 1973–1977. In total he met during 305 days of parliamentary session.

He was a member of the diocesan council in Tunsberg from 1954 to 1958 and 1962 to 1966, and a member of the committee of representatives of the MF Norwegian School of Theology from 1962 to 1971.
