= Johan Mjelde Natvig =

Norwegian politician

Johan Mjelde Natvig (20 February 1915 – 4 August 1998) was a Norwegian politician for the Liberal Party.

He served as a deputy representative to the Parliament of Norway from Rogaland during the terms 1965–1969 and 1969–1973. In total he met during 71 days of parliamentary session.
