= Morten Drægni =

Norwegian politician (born 1983)

Morten Drægni (born 19 August 1983) is a former politician for the Socialist Left Party.

He served as a deputy representative to the Parliament of Norway from Oslo during the terms 2005–2009 and 2009–2013. In total he met during 14 days of parliamentary session.
