= Magne Langerud =

Norwegian politician (1942–1971)

Magne Langerud (20 October 1942 – 25 September 1971) was a Norwegian politician for the Labour Party.

He served as a deputy representative to the Parliament of Norway from Akershus during the term 1965–1969. In total he met during six days of parliamentary session. He resided in Støren.
