= Kari Sørheim =

Norwegian politician

Kari Sørheim (born 12 October 1948) is a Norwegian politician for the Christian Democratic Party.

She served as a deputy representative to the Norwegian Parliament from Hordaland during the terms 1997–2001 and 2001–2005. In total she met during 36 days of parliamentary session.

On the local level she has been a member of the municipal council of Masfjorden Municipality. Among her policies to attract residents to her remote municipality was to subsidize the drivers' license for youth. In 2007 she became deputy mayor.

In 2008 she was elected president of the Norwegian Missionary Society (NMS), winning a vote against Kjell Erfjord at the national convention. She became the second female president of NMS.
