= Ragna Flotve =

Norwegian politician (born 1960)

Ragna Flotve (born 25 September 1960) is a Norwegian politician for the Socialist Left Party.

She served as a deputy representative to the Norwegian Parliament from Hordaland during the term 2001–2005. In total she met during 50 days of parliamentary session.
