= Jakob Eng =

Norwegian politician (1937–2022)

Jakob Eng (25 June 1937 – 2 November 2022) was a Norwegian banker, organizational leader, and politician for the Christian Democratic Party.

== Early life and career ==
He was born on the island of Karmøy as a son of Thomas Emil Eng (1912–1988) and housewife Aslaug Helene Grindhaug (1915–1999). He took a secondary education with emphasis on economy from 1955 to 1958, and learnt business administration at the Norwegian School of Management from 1959 to 1961. After four years in various companies he was hired in the bank Skudesneshavn Sparebank, and he was the bank director from 1966 until 1984.

== Politics ==
Eng became involved in local politics, and was a deputy member of the municipal council of Karmøy Municipality from 1967 to 1971. He was elected in 1971, and even became mayor. He served until 1973, then from 1975 to 1981. He was deputy mayor from 1981 to 1982, then mayor again from 1982 to 1984. He was then a regular council member from 1984 to 2003. He was a member of Rogaland county council from 1979 to 1991, and a deputy member in 1975–1979 and 1991–1995. He chaired the regional party chapter in Rogaland from 1980 to 1983, and was a member of his party's national board in the same period. He chaired his local chapter from 1993 to 1994. Nationally, he served as a deputy member of the Parliament of Norway from Rogaland during the terms 1973–1977, 1977–1981 and 1981–1985. He has been involved in local campaigning after becoming a pensioner too, and in February 2006 Eng became an honorary member of his party.

== Organizational work ==
From 1984 to 1992, Eng worked full-time as chairman of the Norwegian Association of Local and Regional Authorities. He had become involved there as a member of the wages committee from 1976 to 1980. Also, he had been a member of the organization's central committee from 1980, and remained so until 2000. As leader he replaced Sverre Krogh, who received decisive support from the Christian Democratic and Conservative parties—at the time coalition partners with Krogh's Centre Party in Willoch's Second Cabinet.

Through the Norwegian Association of Local and Regional Authorities, Eng became involved in international work. He was a board member of the International Union of Local Authorities (IULA) from 1984 to 1992, and of the International Council of Environmental Initiatives (ICLES) from 1990 to 1998. In the Council of Europe he was a part of the Committee on Regional Problems and Regional Planning from 1980 to 1984, the Conference of Local and Regional Authorities of Europe from 1980 to 2000, the Committee on Environment and Town Planning from 1984 to 1988 and the Standing Committee from 1989 to 1992.

He was also involved in the Norwegian Lutheran Mission and the local parish council. He also held many other memberships in municipal and regional boards and committees, as well as in local enterprises. He lived in Skudeneshavn.

Civic offices
Preceded by Sverre Krogh	Chairman of the Norwegian Association of Local and Regional Authorities; 1984–1992	Succeeded by Halvdan Skard
