= Amund Braaten =

Norwegian politician (1849–1919)

Amund Braaten (6 December 1849 – 2 October 1919) was a Norwegian farmer and politician.

He was born at Slåstadbråten in Sør-Odal Municipality as a son of farmers Jest Braaten (1802–1859) and Marthe Melgaarden (1813–1871). He was a farmer at Slåstadbråten until 1887, when he took over as forest manager for the companies And. H. Kiær & Co. and Lier, Varald og Bogen. He remained so until 1919.

From 1889 to 1891 he was a member of the school board and the municipal council for Kongsvinger Municipality. He later served on the municipal council for Vinger Municipality from 1895 to 1897, then again on the municipal council for Kongsvinger Municipality again from 1910 to 1913. In the 1915 election he stood as the running mate of Axel Thallaug in the constituency Lillehammer, Hamar, Gjøvik og Kongsvinger, and was elected as a deputy representative to the Parliament of Norway for one term, representing the Liberal Left Party. The term finished in 1918, and he died in 1919.
