= Terje Østebø Eikin =

Norwegian politician (born 1975)

Terje Østebø Eikin (born 17 November 1975) is a Norwegian politician for the Christian Democratic Party.

He served as a deputy representative to the Parliament of Norway from Aust-Agder during the term 2013–2017. He hails from Arendal Municipality.
