= Knut H. Njøs =

Norwegian politician (1883–1934)

Knut Hansson Njøs (1883 – 1934) was a Norwegian politician for the Labour Party.

He hailed from Leikanger Municipality. After working as a police officer in Stavanger and in the Dalane District Court organization he was hired in the Sogn District Court office in 1912.

He originally aligned with the Liberal Party, but changed to Labour in 1918. He co-founded the local party branch in Leikanger in 1918 and the regional branch in Sogn in 1920. He served in the school board and municipal council for Leikanger Municipality. In the 1927 Norwegian parliamentary election the Labour Party won one seat in Sogn og Fjordane, and Njøs was elected as the first deputy of MP Anders A. Lothe. He served as such for one term, and died in 1934.
