= Niclas Tokerud =

Norwegian politician (born 1990)

Niclas Tokerud (born 24 May 1990) is a Norwegian politician for the Labour Party. He served as a deputy representative to the Parliament of Norway from Buskerud during the term 2013–2017, and is currently elected to the same position for the term 2017–2021 He hails from Vestfossen.
