= Anne Sandum =

Norwegian politician (born 1973)

Anne Sandum (born 30 June 1973) is a Norwegian politician for the Labour Party.

She served as a deputy representative to the Parliament of Norway from Buskerud during the terms 2009–2013, 2013–2017 and 2017–2021. She hails from Ringerike.
