= Olga Mistereggen =

Norwegian politician

Olga Mistereggen (1 January 1894 – 3 September 1970) was a Norwegian politician for the Labour Party.

She hailed from Ytre Rendal Municipality. She served as a deputy representative to the Parliament of Norway from Hedmark during the term 1950–1953. In total she met during 42 days of parliamentary session. She was also deputy leader of Hedmark Farmers and Smallholders Union.
