= Frode Berge =

Norwegian politician (born 1966)

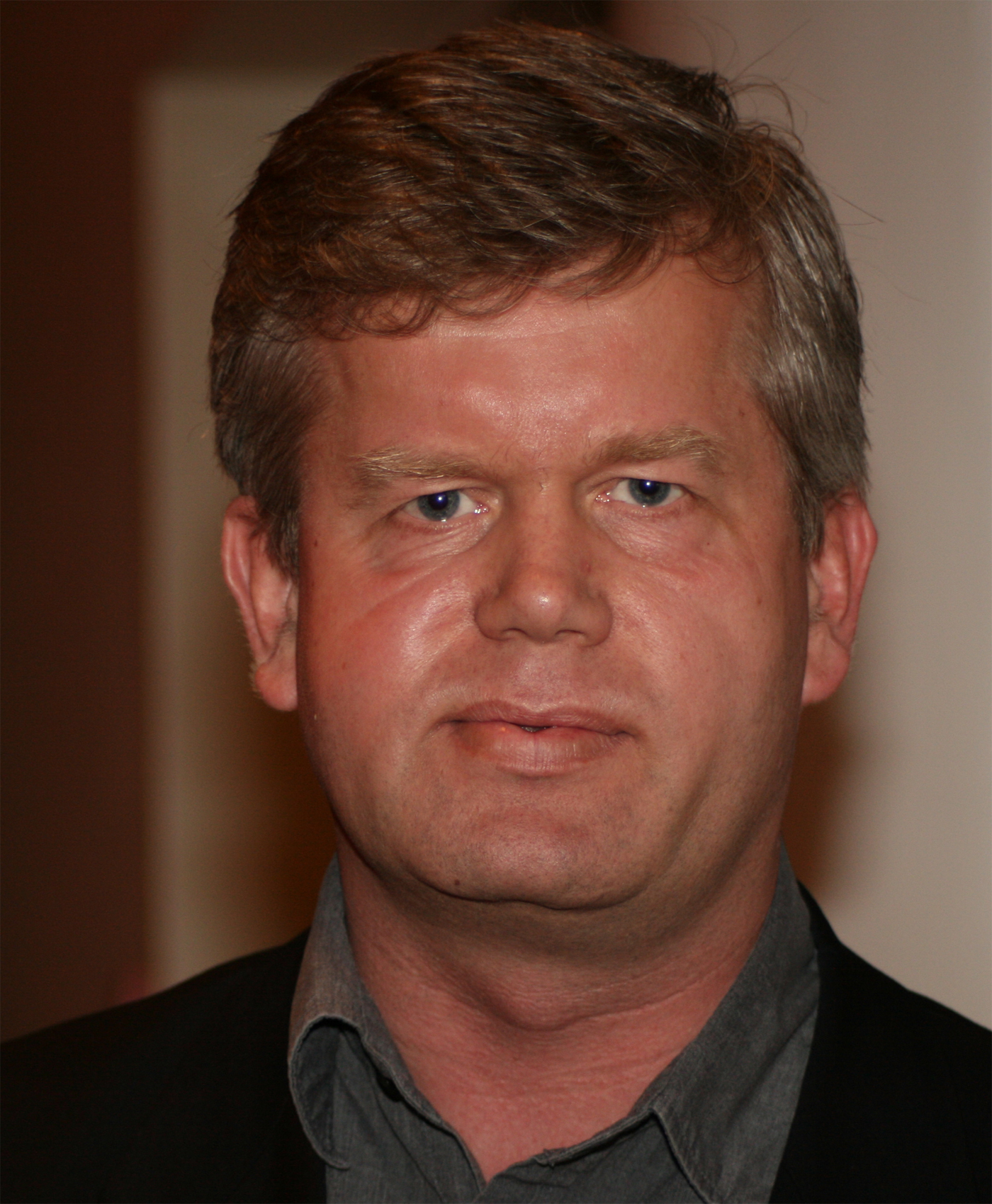
- Born: 5 March 1966 (age 59)
- Occupation: Politician

Frode Berge (born 5 March 1966) is a Norwegian politician for the Labour Party.

He worked as a political advisor to the Norwegian Ministry of Defence from 1990 to 1992, and to the Norwegian Ministry of Children and Family Affairs from 1996 to 1997. In the second cabinet of Jens Stoltenberg, which assumed office in 2005, Berge was appointed State Secretary of the Norwegian Ministry of Trade and Industry. He sought to leave in December 2007, and was replaced by Øyvind Slåke.

He has served in the position of deputy representative to the Norwegian Parliament from Rogaland during the terms 1993–1997 and 2005–2009.
