= Stensson =

Stensson is a surname. Notable people with the surname include:

- Annette Stensson-Fjordefalk (born 1958), Swedish actress
- Katarina Stensson (born 1988), Swedish politician
- Nils Stensson Sture (1512–1527 or 1528), Swedish historical figure
- Svante Stensson Sture (1517–1567), Swedish count and statesman
