= Hallvard Aamlid =

Norwegian politician

- Born: 25 January 1973 (age 53)

Hallvard Aamlid (born 25 January 1973) is a Norwegian politician for the Liberal Party.

Aamlid served as a deputy representative to the Norwegian Parliament from Oslo during the term 1997–2001.

Outside politics he works for the publishing house Universitetsforlaget.
