= Øyvind Slåke =

Norwegian politician (born 1965)

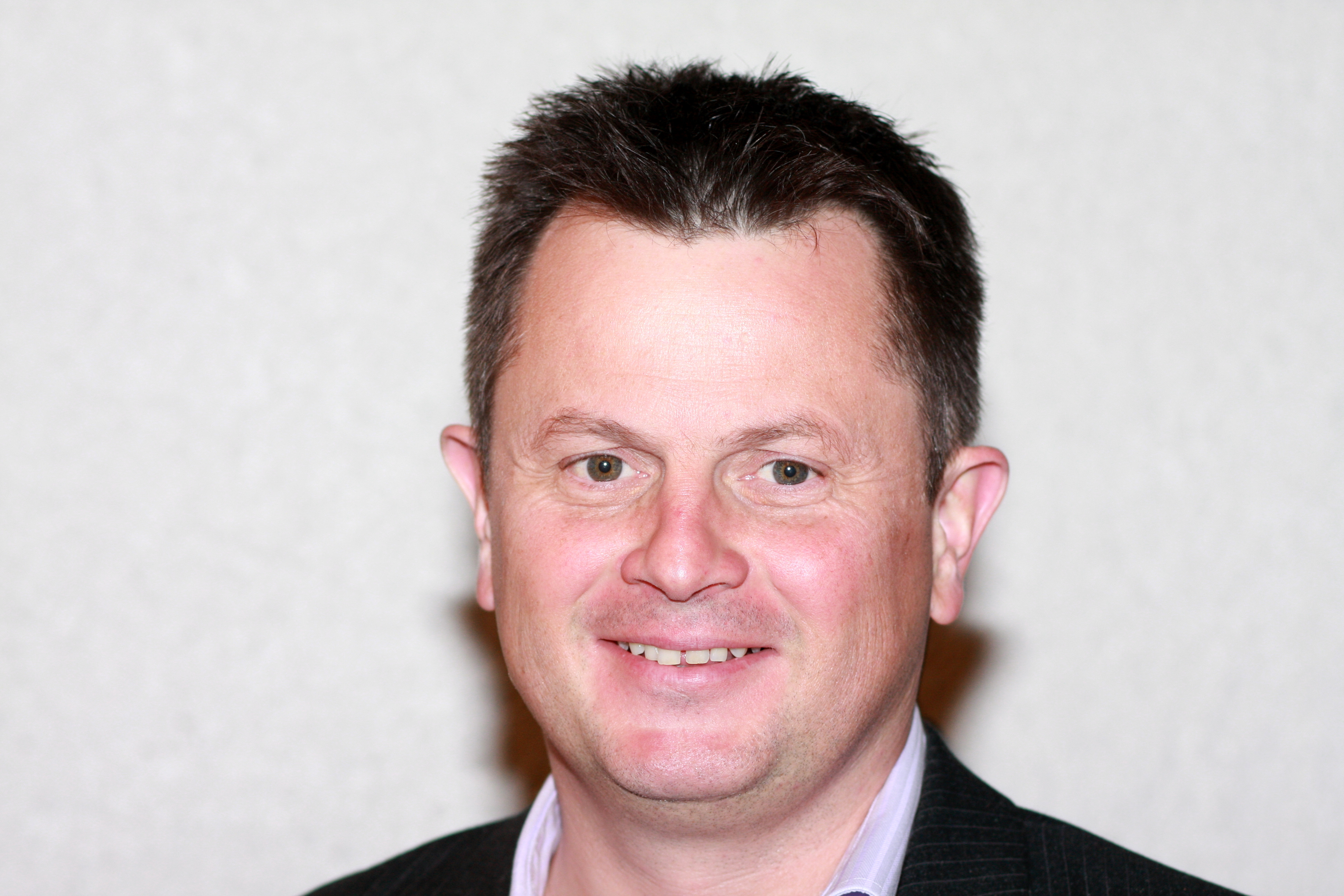
Øyvind Slåke.

Øyvind Slåke (born 17 February 1965) is a Norwegian politician for the Labour Party. Slåke heads the Norwegian Labour Party's Parliamentary Secretariat.

He worked as a political advisor in the Norwegian Ministry of Justice and the Police from 1996 to 1997 during the cabinet Jagland. In 2007, during the second cabinet Stoltenberg, Slåke was appointed State Secretary in the Norwegian Ministry of Trade and Industry when the position was left by Frode Berge.

He has served in the position of deputy representative to the Norwegian Parliament from Hordaland during the term 2001–2005.
