= Liv Løberg =

Norwegian politician

- Born: 28 May 1949 (age 77); Norway
- Occupation: Unemployed
- Spouse: Gerrit Løberg
- Status: Incarceration pending
- Criminal charges: Fraud
- Penalty: Sentenced to 14 months in prison, fined 1 million NOK

Liv Løberg (born 28 May 1949; former names Liv Else Lindeløf and Liv Ranes-Kendall) is a Norwegian practical nurse, a former politician for the Progress Party. Her name came to mass media attention in Norway in June 2010 when it was revealed that she had forged her CV, this being accentuated by the fact that she was an office manager working at the Norwegian Registration Authority for Health Personnel (SAFH). On 24 April 2012, she was convicted of fraud and sentenced to 14 months in prison.

== Education ==
Løberg dropped out of high school and has completed one year of practical nurse (hjelpepleier) education at Aker Hospital in Norway in 1969.

=== False degrees ===
She also claimed to be a registered nurse (sykepleier) and have degrees from the "London School of Economics and Public Administration" (a misunderstanding of the name of the London School of Economics and Political Science) and Queen Mary College and a Siviløkonom (Candidate of Commerce) degree from Norges Handelshøyskole (Norwegian School of Commerce).

== Work ==
From 1994 to 1998 Løberg was the welfare office manager of the borough St. Hanshaugen-Ullevål. She was chief of staff at the Norwegian Meteorological Institute from 1998 to 2000, and head of the economics department at Oslo Orthopedic University Clinic, before becoming division director at Ullevål University Hospital's Laboratory Technical Division. In 2004 she became special advisor, before getting hired as office chief at Norwegian School of Veterinary Science. She was office chief at the Institute for Production Animal Medicine in 2007–2008.

In June 2010 Løberg stepped down as an office manager at SAFH after it was revealed she had forged two English and one Norwegian certificates. Norwegian newspaper Verdens Gang had revealed the case in June 2010, and Løberg withdrew immediately.

== Politics ==
Løberg served as a deputy representative to the Parliament of Norway for the constituency Akershus during the terms 2001–2005 and 2009–2013. She was also member of Vestby municipal council and Akershus county council for the Progress Party and vice head of Akershus Progress Party until 4 July 2010. She was the party's mayoral candidate in Vestby in 2007.

== Criminal conviction ==
The trial of Løberg for fraud and falsifying documents started on 10 April 2012. Her testimony stated that a co-worker had access to her personnel file and started investigating her educational background, and later turned over [the falsified] documentation of educational achievement to a journalist at Verdens Gang. On 24 April 2012, Liv Løberg was convicted by Oslo District Court for fraud and for falsifying documents, and sentenced to 14 months in prison, of which nine must be served. She was also sentenced to pay one million NOK.

== Family ==
She is married to Gerrit Løberg, Chief of Security (sikkerhetssjef) at the Parliament of Norway.
