= Jan Birger Medhaug =

Norwegian politician

Jan Birger Medhaug (born 24 September 1951) is a Norwegian politician, formerly representing the Christian Democratic Party.

From 1999 to 2003 he was the deputy county mayor of Rogaland, under Roald Bergsaker. He also served as a deputy representative to the Parliament of Norway from Rogaland during the term 2001–2005. In 2003 he was about to be nominated as his party's candidate for county mayor, but the nomination was withdrawn as Medhaug was accused of a criminal offence. This case made the national news headlines. He was acquitted for this offence in Karmsund District Court in January 2006, and in Gulating Court of Appeal in March 2007. In June 2007 the Appeals Selection Committee of the Supreme Court of Norway refused to try the case for the Supreme Court.

Medhaug remained a member of municipal council for Karmøy Municipality and Rogaland county council for the rest of the term 2003–2007, but resigned his party membership in 2005 and continued as an independent. Valgerd Svarstad Haugland, the party leader in 2003, was involved in the withdrawal of Medhaug as county mayor candidate. This flawed intervention contributed to her resignation as party leader in 2004.
