= Mette S. Korsrud =

Norwegian politician

Mette Synnøve Korsrud (born 8 June 1941), is a Norwegian politician for the Conservative Party.

She was born in Oslo, and grew up and attended school at Grefsen. She finished her secondary education in 1961, and held various jobs. After an interrupted spell at law school, she took education as an audiographer and founded Strømmen Høresenter AS with her husband Dr. Finn R. Korsrud at Strømmen. She chaired the trade union Norsk Audiografforbund from 1977 to 1979, and was a member of Nordisk Audiologisk Forening during the same period.

She became involved in politics, and chaired the Conservative Party chapter in Lørenskog from 1982 to 1983. She was a member of Lørenskog municipal council from 1987 to 1995 and 1999 to 2007, serving as mayor from 1999 to 2003. She also served as a deputy representative to the Parliament of Norway from Akershus during the terms 2001–2005 and 2005–2009.

Korsrud was a board member of Nedre Romerike Vannverk from 1999 to 2003. She was a board member of the local swimming club from 1975 to 1985 and the Losby Golf Club from 1997 to 1998, and coached the handball team of Fjellhammer IL from 1981 to 1983. She lives at Fjellhamar and has three children; Martin, Marianne and Kristian.
