= Michael Peter Hopp =

Norwegian politician

Michael Peter Hopp (1787, Kragerø – 27 January 1863, Frederikshald) was a Norwegian politician.

He served as a deputy representative to the Norwegian Parliament during the term 1848–1850, representing the constituency of Fredrikshald. He worked as a merchant there.
