= Adolf Kristoffersen =

Norwegian politician

Adolf Kristoffersen (23 September 1891 – 1 July 1964) was a Norwegian politician for the Labour Party.

He served as a deputy representative to the Parliament of Norway from the Market towns of Vestfold county during the terms 1934–1936, 1937–1945 and 1945–1949. In total he met during 76 days of parliamentary session. He represented the city Sandefjord. He was also a deputy chairman in Søndre Vestfold faglige samorg.
