= Monica Gåsvatn =

Norwegian politician (born 1968)

Monica Carmen Gåsvatn (born 9 May 1968) is a Norwegian politician for the Progress and Conservative parties.

She was elected as deputy representative to the Parliament of Norway from Buskerud for the term 2009–2013. Gåsvatn, who married fellow Progress Party politician Jon Jæger Gåsvatn, was a member of Sarpsborg municipal council, Østfold county council and chaired Sarpsborg Progress Party. In March 2013 she exited the party following turmoil during the ballot nomination process. She immediately joined the Conservative Party. For her new party she was elected as deputy representative to the Parliament of Norway for the term 2017–2021.
