= Stein Reegård =

Norwegian politician (born 1951)

Stein Reegård (born 22 March 1951) is a Norwegian economist and politician for the Labour Party. He is the head of economics in the Norwegian Confederation of Trade Unions since 1993.

He graduated from the University of Oslo in 1978 with the cand.oecon. degree. From 1976 to 1978 he worked as a consultant in the Ministry of Finance; from 1977 to 1980 he also chaired the Norwegian Basketball Association.

He then became involved in politics, chairing the Labour Party local chapter in Bærum from 1980 to 1983. He served as state secretary in the Ministry of Consumer Affairs and Administration from 1986 to 1989, in the second cabinet Brundtland, and in the Ministry of Trade from 1990 to 1991 in the third cabinet Brundtland.

He was then hired in the Norwegian Confederation of Trade Unions as leader of the political department. He was appointed head of the economic department in 1993.

He served as a deputy representative to the Norwegian Parliament from Akershus during the term 2005–2009.
