= Anne Marie Stavnes =

Norwegian politician

Anne Marie Stavnes (26 August 1918 in Aure Municipality – 28 August 2002) was a Norwegian Centre Party politician.

She served as a deputy representative to the Norwegian Parliament from Møre og Romsdal between 1969–1973 and 1973–1977. On a local level she was a member of the executive committee of the municipal council of Aure Municipality between 1963–1983.
