= William Mikkelsen =

Norwegian politician (1901–1962)

William Mikkelsen (25 October 1901 – 13 December 1962) was a Norwegian politician for the Labour Party.

He was born in Sør-Varanger Municipality as a son of a smallholder. He spent most of his career as a manual labourer, both at sea and on land. He was a member of the municipal council of Sør-Varanger Municipality from 1945 to 1951 (in the executive committee) and from 1955 to 1962. He served as a deputy representative to the Parliament of Norway from Finnmark during the term 1945–1949. In total she met during 276 days of parliamentary session. He was also a board member of Finnmark Fylkesrederi og Ruteselskap from 1947 to 1959.
