= Kjell Erfjord =

Norwegian politician

Kjell Erfjord (born 24 July 1940) is a Norwegian former educator and politician for the Christian Democratic Party.

He was born in Hjelmeland Municipality as a son of Bernt Erfjord (1898–1981) and Karen Hagen (1905–1990). He was educated in Årdal and Stavanger before attending the Norwegian College of Teaching from 1966 to 1970. He worked as a teacher at Lundheim Folk High School from 1963 to 1970, and headmaster from 1970 to 1985 and 1995 to 1999.

He became involved in politics, and was a member of the municipal council of Lund Municipality from 1971 to 2007, serving as deputy mayor from 1975 to 1979 and mayor from 1981 to 1991 and 1999 to 2007. He was a member of Rogaland county council from 1983 to 1995, serving as deputy county mayor (fylkesvaraordfører) from 1985. He has chaired the local party chapter several times, chaired the county chapter from 1975 to 1979 and was a member of the national board during the same period. He also served as a deputy representative to the Parliament of Norway from Rogaland during the terms 1981–1985, 1985–1989 and 1989–1993. In total, he met during 205 days of parliamentary session.

Erfjord was a member of the county school board from 1979 to 1987. He was the deputy chair of Norges Kristelige Folkehøgskolelag from 1981 to 1985, and chaired Folkehøgskolerådet from 1983 to 1985. He is a Christian, and was a national board member of the Norwegian Missionary Society from 1993 to 1999, serving as deputy leader since 1996. In 2008 he tried to become board chairman of the Norwegian Missionary Society, but at the organization's national convention he lost the vote 188–369 to Kari Sørheim.

In 2007 he was awarded the HM The King's Medal of Merit in gold.
