= Nils-Olav Skilbred =

Norwegian politician (born 1949)

Nils-Olav Skilbred (born 15 December 1949) is a Norwegian politician for the Progress Party.

He served as a deputy representative to the Norwegian Parliament from Telemark during the terms 1997–2001, 2001–2005 and 2005–2009.

On the local level, he is a member of Skien city council.
