= Kari Mette Prestrud =

Norwegian politician (born 1977)

Kari Mette Prestrud (born 28 April 1977) is a Norwegian politician for the Centre Party.

She served as a deputy representative to the Norwegian Parliament from Akershus during the term 2005–2009.

On the local level, she has been a member of Ski municipal council.
