= Anker Nordbø =

Norwegian politician

Anker Nordbø (3 July 1920 – 8 September 1978) was a Norwegian politician for the Socialist Electoral League.

He served as a deputy representative to the Parliament of Norway from Telemark during the term 1973–1977. In total he met during 73 days of parliamentary session. He worked as a secretary in Skien.
