= Sverre Krogh (politician) =

Norwegian politician (1921–2006)

Sverre Krogh (16 August 1921 – 6 June 2006) was a Norwegian farmer, organizational leader and politician for the Centre Party.

He spent his career as a farmer at Mellem-Kroer farm, Ås. He inherited the farm from his father in 1958, and passed it on to his son in 1989.

He was elected to the municipal council in Ås in 1947, and was a council member for 28 years. He spent the years 1956 to 1975 as mayor. He was also a member of Akershus county council from 1956 to 1987, twelve of these as deputy county mayor (fylkesvaraordfører). He served as a deputy member of the Parliament of Norway during the terms 1969–1973, 1973–1977, and 1985–1989. In total he met during 58 days of parliamentary session.

In 1972 Krogh became a member of the board of the new organization Norwegian Association of Local and Regional Authorities. From 1976 to 1984 he chaired this organization. In 1984 he was replaced by Jakob Eng, who received decisive support from the Conservative and Christian Democratic parties—at the time coalition partners with the Centre Party in Willoch's Second Cabinet. Krogh represented Norway in the European Conference of Local Authorities between 1972 and 1984, and in the International Union of Local Authorities (IULA) between 1972 and 1987. From 1972 to 1984 he was also a board member of the International Union of Local Authorities. He was also a member of public bodies such as Hovedkomiteen for reformer i lokalforvaltningen from 1972 to 1985.

In 1988 he was decorated with HM The King's Medal of Merit. He was also an honorary member of his political party. He died in June 2006, not long before his 85th birthday.

Preceded by Thorleif Nilsen	Chairman of the Norwegian Association of Local and Regional Authorities; 1976–1984	Succeeded by Jakob Eng
