= Stensen =

Stensen (cognate Steensen) is a Scandinavian patronymic surname meaning "son of Sten". There are various spellings.

Stensen may refer to:

- Henrik Stenson (born 1976), a Swedish professional golfer
- Nicolas Steno aka Niels Stensen (1638–1686), a Danish pioneer in anatomy and geology
- Sten Stensen (born 1947), a former Norwegian speed skater
- Stensen, an American electronic music producer duo

Steensen may refer to:

- Steen Steensen Blicher (1782–1848), Danish author
- André Steensen (born 1987), Danish racing cyclist
