= Marion Gunstveit Bojanowski =

Norwegian politician (born 1966)

Marion Gunstveit Bojanowski (born 16 May 1966) is a Norwegian politician for the Christian Democratic Party.

She served as a deputy representative to the Parliament of Norway from Aust-Agder during the term 2009–2013. She is from Grimstad Municipality.
