= Ola S. Apeland =

Norwegian politician (born 1964)

Ola S. Apeland (born 14 May 1964) is a Norwegian politician for the Centre Party.

He served as a deputy representative to the Parliament of Norway from Rogaland during the term 1989–1993 and 1993–1997. In total he met during 40 days of parliamentary session.
