= Kristian Mathias Fimland =

Norwegian politician

Kristian Mathias Fimland (16 February 1889 – 22 April 1959) was a Norwegian politician for the Liberal Party.

He served as a deputy representative to the Norwegian Parliament from Østfold during the term 1950–1953.
