= Per Østvold =

Norwegian politician

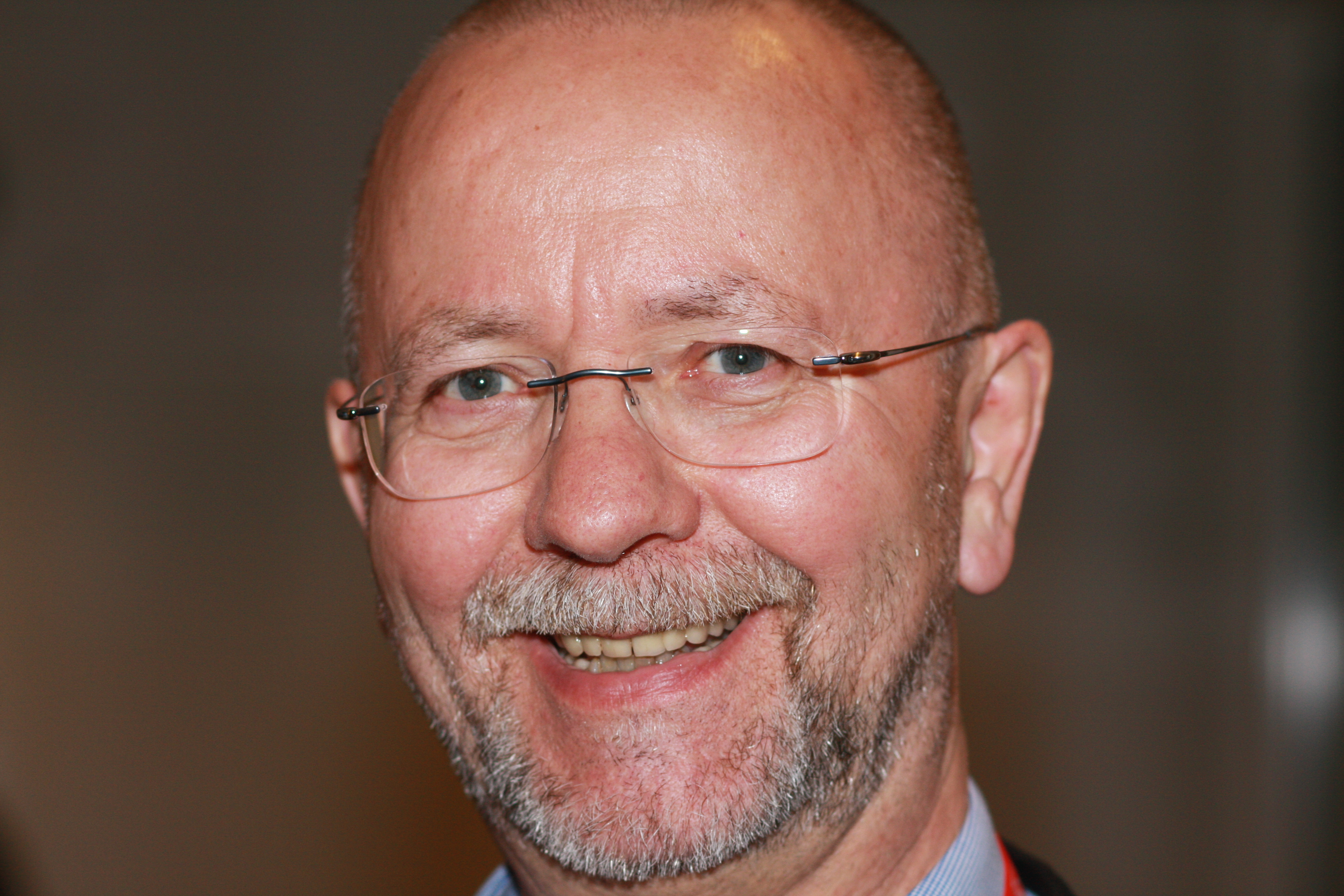
Per Østvold, 2009.

Per Østvold (born 28 April 1949) is a Norwegian trade unionist and politician for the Socialist Left Party.

He was born in Rygge. He became involved in politics at an early age, first in the Norwegian Labour Party and then in the Workers' Communist Party while studying. He then started a career as a laborer, as he was hired in Linjegods in 1976. He became a full-time trade unionist in 1981, and chaired the citywide trade union chapter Oslo Transportarbeiderforening from 1986. He then worked in the nationwide Norwegian Transport Workers' Union, as secretary from 1991 and leader from 1996 to 2009. After stepping down he became a researcher for the Transport Workers' Union. He was succeeded as leader by Roger Hansen.

In 1990 Østvold joined the Socialist Left Party, which is less radical than the Workers' Communist Party. He served as a deputy representative to the Parliament of Norway from Oslo during the terms 1993–1997 and 2001–2005. He was also a member of their central committee.
