= Solfrid Nilsen =

Norwegian politician (born 1937)

Solfrid Nilsen (born 29 January 1937) is a Norwegian politician for the Progress Party.

She served as a deputy representative to the Parliament of Norway from Sør-Trøndelag during the terms 1989–1993 and 1997–2001. In total she met during 8 days of parliamentary session.
