= Thomas Østvold =

Norwegian footballer (born 1973)

Personal information
- Date of birth: 18 October 1973 (age 53)
- Position: Defender

Youth career
- Lyn

Senior career*
Years	Team	Apps	(Gls)
1992−1999	Lyn	111	(5)

International career
1989	Norway u-16	13	(1)
1990	Norway u-17	4	(0)
1991	Norway u-18	6	(1)
1992	Norway u-19	5	(0)
1993	Norway u-20	4	(0)
- * Club domestic league appearances and goals

Thomas Østvold (born 18 October 1973) is a retired Norwegian football defender.

He played for Lyn entire senior career, which he albeit ended at age 26. Of his 111 league games, 18 came in the Eliteserien in the seasons 1992, 1993 and 1997. He was capped on youth level for Norway, and was a squad member at the 1993 FIFA World Youth Championship.
