= Ida Marie Holen =

Norwegian politician (born 1958)

Ida Marie Holen (born 29 March 1958) is a Norwegian politician for the Progress Party.

She served as a deputy representative to the Parliament of Norway from Buskerud during the term 2009–2013.

She has been a member of Ål municipal council.
