= Kari Gløersen =

Norwegian politician (born 1948)

Kari Gløersen (born 11 December 1948) is a Norwegian politician for the Conservative Party.

She served as a deputy representative to the Parliament of Norway from Hedmark during the terms 1997–2001 and 2001–2005. In total she met during 37 days of parliamentary session.
