= Per Kristian Dahl =

Norwegian politician (born 1960)

Per Kristian Dahl (born 18 November 1960) is a Norwegian politician for the Labour Party. He served as a deputy representative to the Norwegian Parliament from Østfold during the term 2005–2009. Locally, Dahl is the mayor of Halden municipality since 2003.
