= Wilhelm Thøgersen =

Norwegian politician

Wilhelm Thøgersen (24 April 1913 – 11 February 2005) was a Norwegian politician for the Labour Party.

He served as a deputy representative to the Parliament of Norway from Østfold during the terms 1958–1961, 1961–1965 and 1965–1969. In total he met during 6 days of parliamentary session.
