= Martin Ski =

Norwegian politician

Martin Ski (24 November 1912 – 3 October 1983) was a Norwegian politician for the Christian Democratic Party.

He served as a deputy representative to the Parliament of Norway from Oslo during the term 1961–1965. In total he met during 4 days of parliamentary session.
