= Niels-Henrik Kolderup =

Norwegian politician

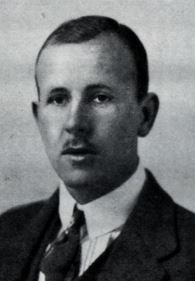
- Born: 31 January 1898; Bergen, Norway
- Died: 2 January 1971 (aged 72); Bergen, Norway
- Education: University of Bergen; Ph.D. (1928)
- Occupations: Geologist, seismologist, politician
- Organization: University of Bergen
- Father: Carl Fredrik Kolderup
- Awards: Order of St. Olav (1967) The King's Merit Medal in gold Member of the Norwegian Academy of Sciences 1948 Member Society for the Advancement of Science 1952

Niels-Henrik Kolderup (31 January 1898 – 2 January 1971) was a Norwegian geologist, seismologist, and professor. He served as Vice-Chancellor of the University of Bergen. He was a member of the Conservative Party and served as a member of the Norwegian Parliament (1945-1953).

== Biography ==
He was the son of Carl Fredrik Kolderup (1869–1942) and Kitty Pedersen (1871–1961). He studied at the Norwegian Military Academy from 1916 to 1917 and was then employed at the Bergen Museum in 1919, where his father Carl Fredrik Kolderup was a professor. He received his Ph.D. at the University of Bergen in 1928.

He became a professor at the Bergen Museum in 1939, the same year his father retired, and at the University of Bergen from 1948. He later served as Dean of the Faculty of Mathematics and Natural Sciences and Vice-Chancellor of the University. His research was primarily on geology and seismology. He was a deputy member of the Storting representing the constituency Bergen from 1945 to 1953.

In 1918, Kolderup become a Second Lieutenant in the Norwegian military, First Lieutenant in 1925, and Captain in 1935. He was arrested in 1941, during the German occupation of Norway, for being a part of the Norwegian resistance movement against Nazi occupation, and was taken to Grini, a concentration camp located near Oslo. He was released, re-arrested, and then taken to Germany. He spent there three years in concentration camps including Natzweiler, Dachau, and Sachsenhausen. At the end of the war, Kolderup was found paralyzed from the waist down and thought to be nearly dead. He spent time in Sweden recovering before returning home to Bergen.

== Personal life ==
He married Else Krabbe in 1928 and together they had four daughters. He was decorated Knight of the Order of St. Olav in 1967.
