= Ruth Stenersen =

Norwegian politician (born 1960)

Ruth Stenersen (born 3 April 1960) is a Norwegian politician for the Christian Democratic Party.

She served as a deputy representative to the Norwegian Parliament from Troms during the terms 1997–2001 and 2001–2005.

From 2001 to 2004, during the second cabinet Bondevik, she was appointed political advisor in the Norwegian Ministry of Children and Family Affairs.
