= Kurt Nordbø =

Norwegian politician

Kurt Nordbø (1 August 1931 – 17 October 2009) was a Norwegian politician for the Socialist Electoral League.

He served as a deputy representative to the Parliament of Norway from Rogaland during the term 1973–1977. In total he met during 14 days of parliamentary session.
