= Andreas M. Lervik =

Norwegian politician (born 1969)

Andreas M. Lervik (born 28 November 1969) is a Norwegian politician for the Labour Party.

He served as a deputy representative to the Norwegian Parliament from Østfold during the terms 2001–2005 and 2005–2009. (He was then a member of the Socialist Left Party.)

He was a member of Sarpsborg municipal council 1995-2003 and of Østfold county council since 1999.

He has had many different positions, and he is currently chair of the Østfold county councils committee for Commerce, Trade and Culture. He is also Deputy Chair of the Labour party's county council group. Lervik has been working with international questions for several years and is currently Vice President for North Sea Commission.
