= 2008 in Norway =

Events in the year 2008 in Norway.

== Incumbents ==
- Monarch: Harald V.
- Prime Minister: Jens Stoltenberg

== Events ==
=== January ===
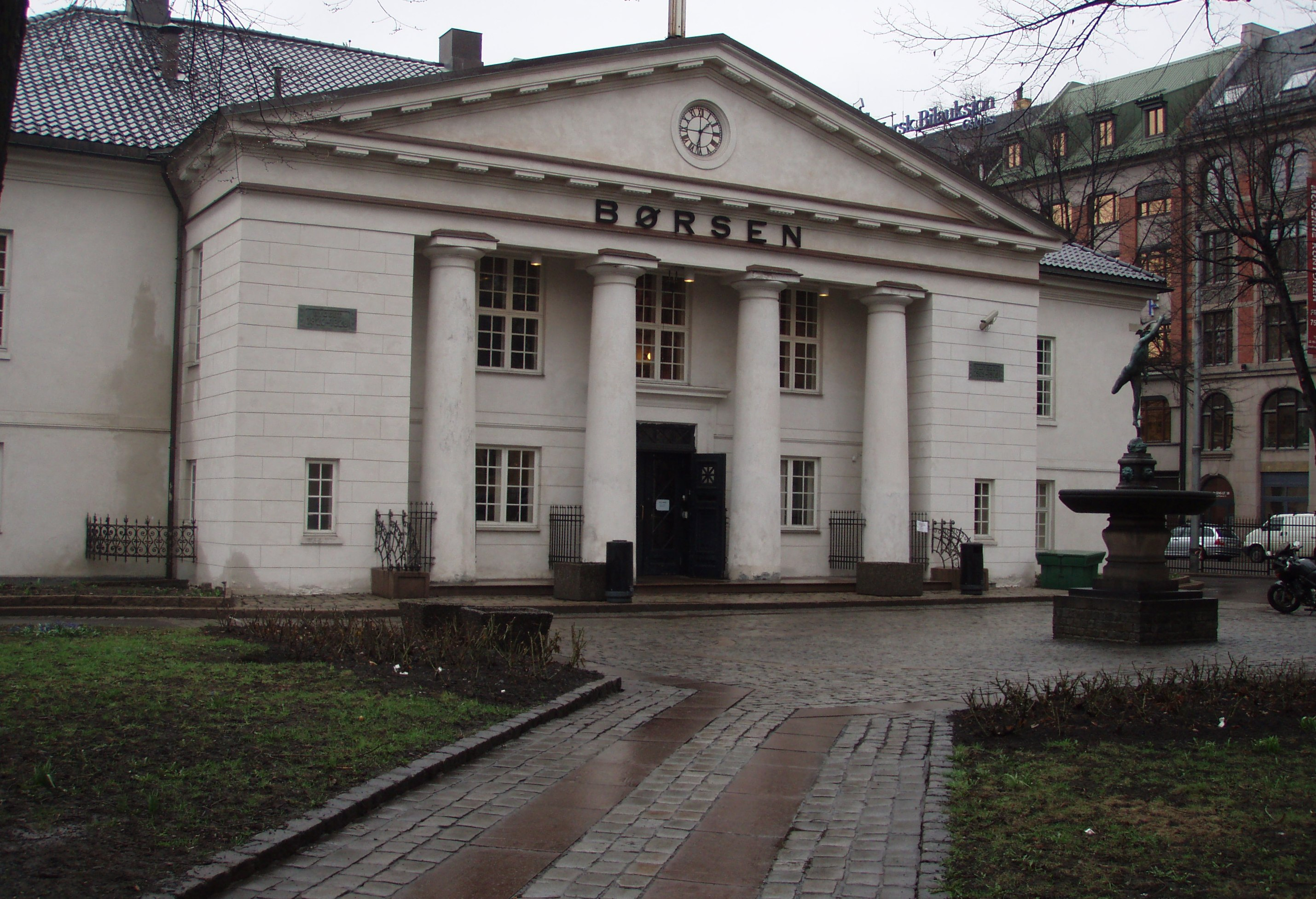
Oslo Stock Exchange languishes during the 2008 financial crisis.

- 1 January – The Agency for Public Management and eGovernment is established.
- 1 January – Nordic Battlegroup consisting of military forces from Sweden, Finland, Norway, Republic of Ireland, and Estonia under the control of the European Union, is established.
- 1 January – Mercury becomes banned from use in Norway.
- 11 January – Norwegian police announce that they have arrested a 55-year-old man suspected of being the sexual predator known as The Pocket Man.
- 13 January – A school in Lørenskog Municipality is closed after threats of a school shooting came from a video on YouTube. A 15-year-old was arrested for the threat.
- 21 January – The OBX Index drops 6.4%, then the second biggest fall since August 1991 and the third largest in its history.

=== February ===
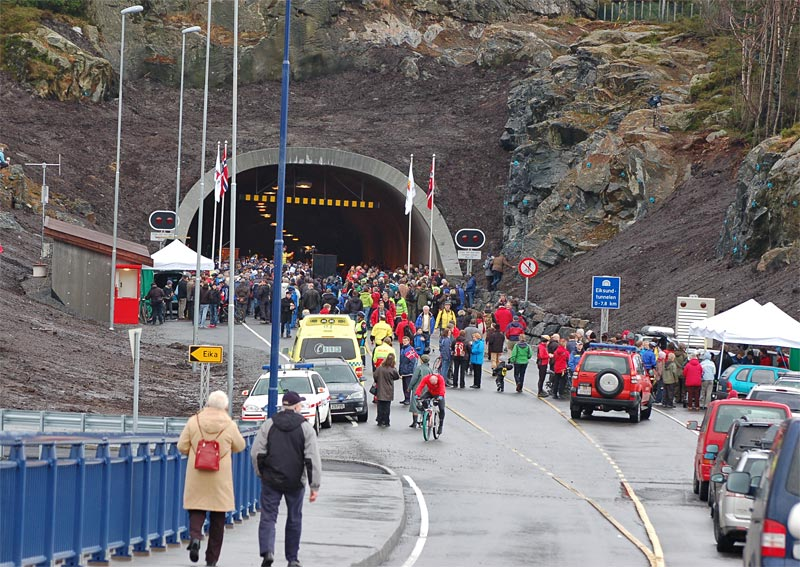
Official opening of Eiksund undersea tunnel on 23 February 2008.

- 5 February – The Standing Committee on Scrutiny and Constitutional Affairs opens the case to decide whether three Supreme Court Justices will be impeached over their involvement in the Fritz Moen wrongful conviction.
- 14 February – A political case centering on Manuela Ramin-Osmundsen forces her to resign from her post as Minister of Children and Equality and Ida Hjort Kraby to resign from her newly appointed position as Ombudsman for Children in Norway.
- 21 February – An earthquake measuring 6.1 on the moment magnitude scale hits Svalbard. This oblique-slip shock had a maximum Mercalli intensity of IV (Light) and was the strongest earthquake ever to hit Norway.
- 23 February – The 8-kilometre (5.0 mi) long Eiksund Tunnel near Volda in Møre og Romsdal is opened.
- 26 February – The Svalbard Global Seed Vault is officially opened.
- 28 February – Three people were arrested in Oslo, accused of having participated in the financing of terrorist acts abroad.
- 29 February – Anniken Huitfeldt is appointed Minister of Children and Equality.
- February – Former Prime Minister Gro Harlem Brundtland is entangled in a political scandal over cancer treatments paid for by the Norwegian state, which she was not entitled to having previously changed her residency abroad.

=== March ===
- 1 March – Austrian Matthias Lanzinger collides with a gate during a World Cup Super-G run at Kvitfjell, resulting in injuries that lead to his left leg being amputated below the knee two days later.
- 28 March – Norway recognizes Kosovo as an independent state.

=== April ===
- 12 April – Official opening of the Oslo Opera House.

=== May ===
- 15 May – Ingeborg Synnøve Midtømme is appointed bishop of the diocese of Møre.

=== June ===
- 11 June – Norway legalises same-sex marriage.
- September – 2008 psychic phone call controversy: it was revealed that the Norwegian politician Saera Khan had racked up extremely high phone bills using the mobile phone with which she was provided for free by the Parliament.

=== September ===
- 9 September – The OBX Index drops 5.57%, then the fourth biggest drop ever.
- 29 September – During the 2008 financial crisis, the OBX Index of the Oslo Stock Exchange drops 8.3%, then its third largest drop ever in one day, but eclipsed only one week later.

=== October ===
- 6 October – The OBX Index drops 9.71%, the third largest drop ever in one day.
- 8 October – The OBX Index drops 6.44%
- October – Bangladeshi-Norwegian parliamentarian for the Labour Party Saera Khan withdraws her candidacy for next year's elections when it is revealed that she has spent large sums using her parliament paid-for mobile phone to call psychic hotlines and then consistently lied to cover up the fact.
- October – Controversy erupts when British writer and Holocaust denier David Irving is invited to the 2009 Norwegian Festival of Literature at Lillehammer, to discuss his concept of truth, ending in Irving's invitation being withdrawn. Author Stig Sæterbakken resigns as the festival's content director in protest over the decision.
- 15 October – The OBX Index drops 8.81%
- 24 October – The OBX Index drops 9.24%

=== December ===
- 13 December – Six people died in a fire in an apartment building in Oslo.
- 29 December - 2008–09 Oslo riots starts.

== Popular culture ==
=== Film and Entertainment ===
- Nearly 80% of Norway's population engages with content from NRK, the country's public broadcaster, and NRK1 remains the leading TV channel with its drama Himmelblå setting a record for Norwegian TV.
- Norwegian films have their best year since 2003, with total admissions increasing by nearly 50% to almost 2.7 million.
- The WWII drama Max Manus quickly becomes one of the top films of the year, alongside other successful local films like The Kautokeino Rebellion, Long Flat Balls II, and Cold Prey 2.

=== Sports ===
- October – Tromsø's bid to become host city to the 2018 Winter Olympics is cancelled when the sports board of Norwegian Confederation of Sports votes 9 against 3 to withdraw the application for government financial guarantee.

=== Music ===
- Norway in the Eurovision Song Contest 2008

=== Literature ===
- Headhunters - Jo Nesbø

=== Cultural Events ===
- Sandnes and Stavanger are named European Capitals of Culture, joining Liverpool as part of an EU initiative.

== Anniversaries ==
- 200 years since the birth of the poet Henrik Wergeland on 17 June 1808
- 100 years since Norway national football team played its first international game on 12 July 1908, in Gothenburg, Sweden
- 100 years since the sports club SK Brann was established (26 September).
- 100 years since the birth of the poet Olav H. Hauge on 18 August 1908
- 100 years since the birth of the composer and pianist Geirr Tveitt 19 October 1908
- 70 years since the death of Queen Maud of Norway on 20 November 1938

== Sport ==
- January – The 2008 European Men's Handball Championship is hosted by the Norwegian Handball Federation with venues in Bergen, Drammen, Lillehammer, Stavanger and Trondheim.

== Notable births ==
- 29 September – Emma Tallulah Behn, the daughter of Princess Märtha Louise of Norway and Ari Behn.

== Notable deaths ==
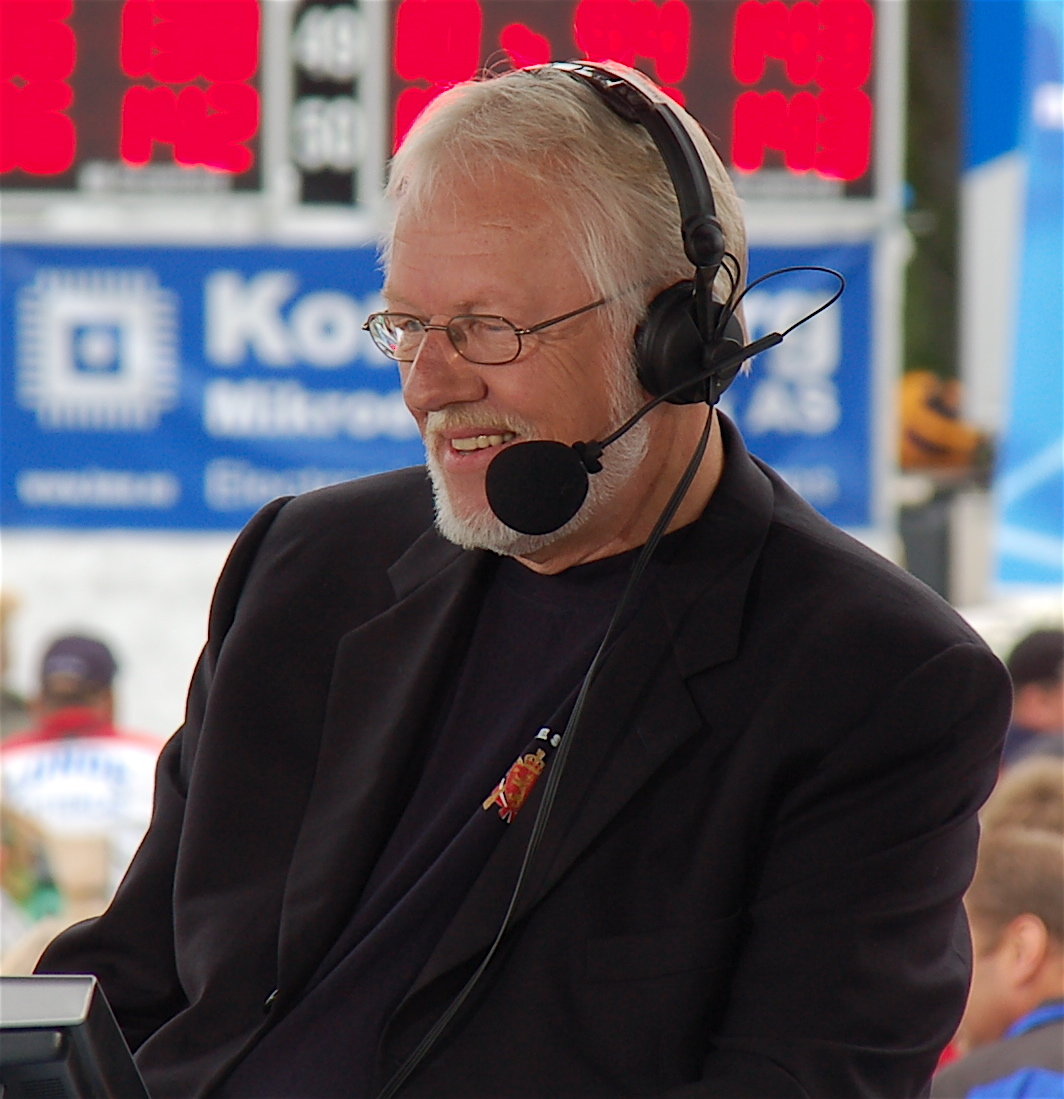
Kjell Kristian Rike (1944–2008)

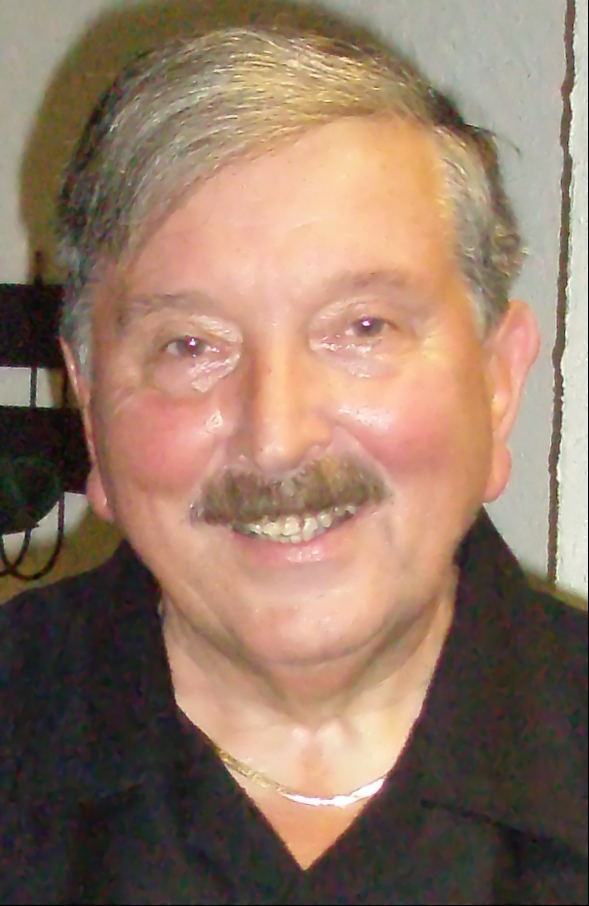
Aril Edvardsen (1938–2008)

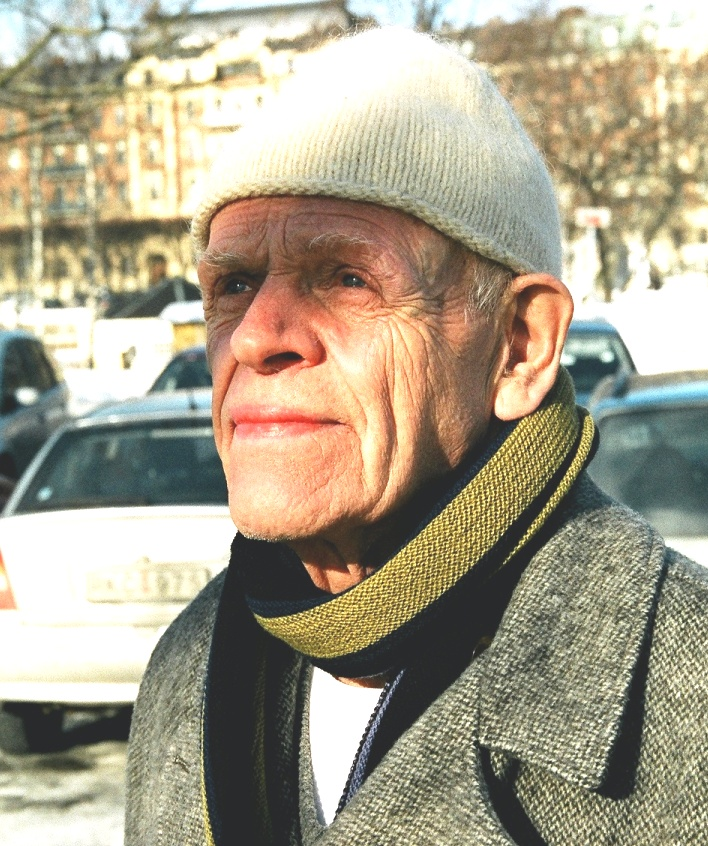
Kjartan Slettemark (1932–2008)

- 3 January – Bjarne Aagaard Strøm, politician (b. 1920).
- 4 January – Bjørn Odmar Andersen, footballer (b. 1943).
- 13 January – Ragnhild Langmyr, painter (b. 1907).
- 14 January – Ingvar Heggsum, painter (b. 1918).
- 14 January – Bjørn Paulson, high jumper and jurist (b. 1923).
- 14 January – Carsten Thomassen, journalist, killed in terrorist attack (b. 1969).
- 19 January – Astrid Løken, entomologist (b. 1911)
- 23 January – Stein Rønning, karateka (b. 1965).
- 23 January – Odd Henrik Sælen, oceanographer (b. 1920).
- 24 January – Johannes Heggland, author and politician (b. 1919).
- 26 January – Einar Sverre Pedersen, aviator (b. 1919).
- 26 January – Einar Løchen, Supreme Court justice (b. 1918).
- 28 January – Dagfinn Grønoset, author (b. 1920).
- 28 January – Marie Takvam, author and actor (b. 1926).
- 30 January – Knut Haugmark, actor (b. 1952).
- 2 February – Gudmund Sandvik, historian (b. 1925).
- 4 February – Aagot Støkken, actress (b. 1923).
- 9 February – Nils Retterstøl, psychiatrist (b. 1924).
- 10 February – Ove Jørstad, footballer (b. 1970).
- 10 February – Arne Barhaugen, Nordic combined skier (b. 1932).
- 13 February – Thorvald Gressum, politician (b. 1914).
- 15 February – Inge Thun, footballer (b. 1945).
- 15 February – Magnar Hellebust, politician (b. 1914).
- 16 February – Per Erik Monsen, politician (b. 1946).
- 22 February – Gerd Olaug Berger, politician (b. 1915).
- 4 March – Bjørn Jenseg, actor (b. 1932).
- 5 March – Erik Wiik-Hansen, yacht racer (b. 1934).
- 7 March – Julius Paltiel, Holocaust survivor (b. 1924).
- 10 March – Marianne Gullestad, social anthropologist (b. 1946).
- 12 March – Steinar Kvale, psychologist (b. 1938).
- 14 March – Ingvald Ulveseth, politician (b. 1924).
- 14 March – Harald Trefall, anti-immigration activist (b. 1925).
- 14 March – Guri Tambs-Lyche, activist (b. 1917).
- 15 March – Fredrik Friis, impresario (b. 1923).
- 16 March – Victor Sparre, artist (b. 1919).
- 18 March – Bjørg Gaselle, children's writer (b. 1923, died in Spain).
- 19 March – Eivind Solberg, jazz trumpeter (b. 1933).
- 20 March – John Willem Gran, Catholic bishop (b. 1920, died in France).
- 22 March – Arne Skarpsno, "father of the street children" (b. 1926).
- 24 March – Odin Sivertsen, politician (b. 1914).
- 26 March – Sigmund Strømme, book publisher (b. 1923).
- 28 March – Knut Lier-Hansen, resistance member (b. 1916).
- 30 March – Halvor Roll, writer (b. 1929).
- 30 March – Aage Vestøl, chess player (b. 1922).
- 31 March – Stein Haugen, discus thrower (b. 1933).
- 5 April – Oskar Edøy, politician (b. 1916).
- 9 April – Haaken A. Christensen, art collector (b. 1924).
- 11 April – Magne Haraldstad, politician (b. 1937).
- 14 April – Harald A. Enge, nuclear physicist (b. 1920, died in the US)
- 19 April – Klaus Halvorsen, politician (b. 1942).
- 21 April – Ola M. Hestenes, politician (b. 1919)
- 23 April – Haagen Ringnes, journalist and author (b. 1928).
- 29 April – Julie Ege, actress and model (b. 1943).
- 3 May – Åge Standal Holter, scholar of religion (b. 1919).
- 5 May – Astrid Gunhilde Karlsen, politician (b. 1920).
- 10 May – Erik Borge, film director and producer (b. 1924).
- 15 May – Tove Billington Bye, politician (b. 1928).
- 15 May – Ottar Grønvik, philologist and runologist (b. 1916).
- 18 May – Odd Strand, civil servant (b. 1925)
- 19 May – Kjell Kristian Rike, sports commentator (b. 1944).
- 29 May – Torbjørg Aas Gravalid, fiddler (b. 1916).
- 2 June – Geir Kjetsaa, literary historian, translator and author (b. 1937).
- 8 June – Tore Falch Nilsen, ice hockey player (b. 1948).
- 9 June – Christian Lerche, physician (b. 1917).
- 11 June – Gunnar Solum, politician (b. 1929).
- 13 June – Per Fuglum, historian (b. 1924).
- 15 June – Ole-Jørgen Nilsen, actor and theatre director (b. 1936).
- 19 June – Antonio Bibalo, pianist and composer (b. 1922).
- 22 June – Odd Aukrust, economist (b. 1915).
- 22 June – Jens Petter Ekornes, entrepreneur and politician (b. 1942).
- 22 June – Hans Haga, agrarian leader (b. 1924).
- 22 June – Einar W. Sissener, businessperson (b. 1929)
- 24 June – Kari Røhmen Langaas, painter and printmaker (b. 1920).
- 26 June – Asbjørn Haugstvedt, politician (b. 1926).
- 27 June – Sasha Gabor, pornographic actor (b. 1945).
- 29 June – Jørn Skille, civil servant (b. 1942).
- 30 June – Annemarie Lorentzen, politician (b. 1921).
- 2 July – Per Andersson, architect and city planner (b. 1921).
- 3 July – Harald Heide-Steen Jr., actor, comedian and singer (b. 1939).
- 5 July – Dagfinn Næss, boxer (b. 1934).
- 8 July – Erling Rønneberg, resistance member and politician (b. 1923).
- 8 July – Knut Bøckman, chess writer (b. 1932)
- 9 July – Hans Hjelle, politician (b. 1916).
- 10 July – Kåre Rodahl, physician (b. 1917).
- 14 July – Henki Kolstad, actor (b. 1915).
- 21 July – Knut Boye, civil economist (b. 1937).
- 25 July – Roy Blohm, painter (b. 1922).
- 30 July – Erik Himle, civil servant and politician (b. 1924).
- 30 July – Terje Thoen, ice hockey player (b. 1944).
- 1 August – Tore Breda Thoresen, theatre director (b. 1924).
- 1 August – Rolf Bae, mountaineer (b. 1975, died in Pakistan).
- 2 August – Helga Gitmark, politician (b. 1929).
- 2 August – Kåre Grøndahl Hagem, politician (b. 1915).
- 8 August – Ann-Mari Aasland, politician (b. 1915).
- 12 August – Helge Hagerup, writer (b. 1933).
- 15 August – Thor Pedersen, rower (b. 1924).
- 18 August – Ole Frithjof Klemsdal, politician (b. 1923).
- 31 August – Ragnhild Mikkelsen, speed skater (b. 1931).
- 1 September – Jens Sterri, civil servant (b. 1923).
- 2 September – Andreas Zeier Cappelen, politician (b. 1915).
- 6 September – Aril Edvardsen, evangelical preacher and missionary (b. 1938, died in Kenya).
- 11 September – Nils Johan Ringdal, historian (b. 1952, died in Indonesia).
- 14 September – Knut S. Heier, geochemist (b. 1929)
- 20 September – Arne Haugestad, barrister (b. 1935).
- 27 September – Olaf Poulsen, speed skater and official (b. 1920)
- 28 September – Ivar Kåre Mathisen, politician (b. 1921).
- 5 October – Erik Hultberg, architect (b. 1931).
- 6 October – Anne Margrethe Strømsheim, resistance member (b. 1914)
- 7 October – Ivar Mathisen, canoeist (b. 1920).
- 12 October – Vessa Hanssen, opera singer (b. 1937).
- 14 October – Bodil Finsveen, politician (b. 1934).
- 18 October – Tormod Haugen, author (b. 1945).
- 21 October – Helge Fæhn, theologian (b. 1918).
- 23 October – Liv Marit Moland, politician (b. 1948).
- 30 October – Nils Kåre Jacobsen, publisher (b. 1929).
- 31 October – John Klemetsen, boxing coach and promoter (b. 1938).
- 8 November – Bodil Aakre, jurist and politician (b. 1922).
- 14 November – Knut Bjørnsen, sports commentator and television presenter (b. 1932).
- 24 November – Rolf Ketil Bjørn, businessperson and politician (b. 1938).
- 13 December – Kjartan Slettemark, artist (b. 1932, died in Sweden).
- 15 December – Anne-Catharina Vestly, children's author (b. 1920).
- 23 December – Frank Krog, actor (b. 1954).
- 23 December – Paul M. Strande, military officer (b. 1912).
- 27 December – Arild Andresen, footballer and ice hockey player (b. 1928)

Full date missing

- Torbjørn Kristoffer Christiansen, diplomat (b. 1924).
- Bjørg Arisland, children's writer (b. 1929).
- Ruth Rye Josefsen, politician (b. 1923).
- Kjell Bygstad, politician (b. 1938).
- Torstein Bertelsen, ophthalmologist (b. 1923).
- Sigmund Kjos, industrialist and politician (b. 1931).
- Arnfinn Karlstad, ski jumper (b. 1932).
- Reidun Nortvedt, novelist (b. 1947).
- Gerd Pettersen, resistance member (b. 1914).
- Jon Strømsheim, politician (b. 1915).
- Hans Svartdahl, Pentecostal leader (b. 1920).
- Brit Sørensen, sculptor (b. 1923).
- Rolf Trøen, speed skater (b. 1935).
- Thor Volla, principal (b. 1929).
- Tor Vaa, sculptor (b. 1928).
- Torbjørn "Tobben" Willassen, musician (b. 1949).
