= Ana María Gayoso =

Argentinian marine microbiologist

- Born: 20 August 1948
- Died: 28 December 2004 (aged 56); Puerto Madryn, Argentina
- Education: National University of La Plata
- Occupation: Marine biologist

Ana María Gayoso (20 August 1948 – 28 December 2004) was an Argentine marine biologist, a specialist in study of marine phytoplankton, best known for being the first scientist to describe phytoplankton in the Bahía Blanca Estuary, and to initiate the sustained long-term oceanographic dataset in this ecosystem. She made significant contributions to the understanding of harmful algal blooms caused by toxic dinoflagellate species in the Patagonian gulfs, and was the first scientist to describe high abundances of the coccolithophore Emiliania huxleyi in the Argentine Sea, a key component in the primary productivity along the Patagonian Shelf Break front in the SW South Atlantic. She started the most extensive (1978–present) long-term database of phytoplankton and physico-chemical variables in South America, in a fixed monitoring site in the Bahía Blanca Estuary. She died on 28 December 2004 in Puerto Madryn.

== Education ==
Gayoso graduated in botany and obtained a PhD in Natural Sciences at the Faculty of Natural Sciences and Museum of the National University of La Plata.

== Scientific career ==
In 1977, she became a researcher in the National Scientific and Technical Research Council, CONICET, Argentina. From 1978 to 1995 she worked at the Argentine Institute of Oceanography (IADO) in Bahía Blanca, where she led the Plankton Laboratory. Her scientific career focused on the study of marine phytoplankton in the South Western South Atlantic.

In 1989 she participated in an oceanographic cruise along the Argentine Sea and characterized the phytoplankton of the Brazil–Malvinas Confluence. In particular, she specialized on the taxonomy and ecology of diatoms and toxic dinoflagellates.

She made significant contributions to the understanding of harmful algal blooms caused by toxic dinoflagellate species in the Patagonian gulfs, and was the first scientist to describe high abundances of the coccolithophore Emiliania huxleyi in the Argentine Sea, a key component in the primary productivity along the Patagonian Shelf Break front in the SW South Atlantic. She started the most extensive (1978–present) long-term database of phytoplankton and physico-chemical variables in South America, in a fixed monitoring site in the Bahía Blanca Estuary.

She applied electron microscopy techniques in the identification of marine diatom species in the Argentine Sea, such as the first morphological description of Thalassiosira hibernalis A.M. Gayoso, 1989, and the ecophysiology of the key blooming species Thalassiosira curviseriata isolated from the Bahía Blanca Estuary. During her work at IADO, she contributed to technical reports assessing the water quality of large reservoirs which supply cities in the area, contributing to the detection and description of nuisance cyanobacteria blooms, potentially toxic for human health.

Since 1995, she worked at the National Patagonian Center (CENPAT-CONICET) in Puerto Madryn and was co-director of the institute during 1998–2000, where she made important contributions to the understanding of harmful algal blooms (HABs) or "red tides" prevalent in the Patagonian gulfs since the first HABs event registered in 1981, with particular interest in the toxic dinoflagellates Alexandrium spp.

She worked with Theodore Smayda at the University of Rhode Island on diatoms and harmful algae.

=== Long-term database in Bahía Blanca Estuary ===
Her contribution to the understanding of the occurrence of the winter-early spring diatom bloom in Bahía Blanca temperate estuary over the years 1978-1994 represented the beginning of an invaluable long-term database of phytoplankton and in situ environmental variables. This dataset is one the most extensive (1978–present) in South America, which together with its high sampling frequency has allowed the detection of compositional and phenological shifts in the annual cycle of phytoplankton biomass and other components of the plankton.

=== First report of E. huxleyi in Argentine Sea ===
In 1989, she participated in an oceanographic expedition in which she reported and described for the first time, the presence of high densities of the coccolithophore Emiliania huxleyi.

== The Gayoso expedition ==
In austral summer 2021, a joint expedition took place along the Patagonian Shelf between Buenos Aires and Ushuaia to target the large Emiliania huxleyi annual bloom. The expedition was named after Gayoso to honor her scientific legacy.

- In November 2021, the Houssay schooner sailed from Ushuaia to Buenos Aires
- In December 2021, the Tara Expedition schooner sailed in the opposite direction, from Buenos Aires to Ushuaia
