= Sissener (family) =

The Sissener family in Norway originates from the Belgian colonel Wilhelm Sissener. He had eleven children, and some of his numerous descendants are well-known personalities in Norway.

- Einar Sissener (1897-1968) was an actor, director and cabarettist.
- Wilhelm Sissener (1901-1977) was a successful businessman who brought the Norwegian pharmacy company Apothekernes Laboratorium up to international level.
- Einar W. Sissener (1929-2008) became chairman of Apothekernes Laboratorium (later called Alpharma) after his father Wilhelm. He and his brother Jan W. Sissener (Norwegian Consul of Switzerland) have received the Order of St. Olav, a highly respected rank given out by HM King Harald V of Norway.
- Jan Petter Sissener (1955-), the son of late Ellen Sissener, is considered a guru in the Norwegian financial markets.

== Gallery ==
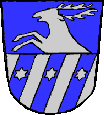
Shield of arms from the book Norske slektsvåpen (Norwegian Family Coats of Arms) (1969)
