= Saera =

Saera may refer to:

- Saera Khan (born 1979), a Bangladeshi-Norwegian politician
- Saera (wasp), a wasp genus in the subfamily Encyrtinae
