= Fuglum =

Fuglum is a surname. Notable people with the surname include:

- Erlend Fuglum, Norwegian politician
- Per Fuglum, Norwegian historian and professor
