= Den Norske Næringsmiddelfabrik =

Former Norwegian food manufacturer; first Norwegian pasta maker

- Company type: Aksjeselskap
- Industry: Food
- Founded: 1913
- Headquarters: Elverum (from 1978); formerly Oslo, Norway
- Products: Pasta (Sopps brand), food products
- Owner: Orkla (from 2012)

Den Norske Næringsmiddelfabrik (Norwegian for "The Norwegian Foodstuffs Factory"; also known as DNN or Sopps) was a food factory in Oslo that was the first in Norway to produce macaroni and spaghetti. Established in 1913 and based at Skøyen in Oslo, it sold pasta under the Sopps brand, named for the physician and mycologist Olav Johan Sopp, who lent his name to Dr. Sopps Makaroni around 1921.

In 1960 the company was taken over by the neighboring pharmaceutical firm Apothekernes Laboratorium, whose sales arm Nopal carried on the pasta business. Production moved to Elverum in 1978. The Elverum factory was sold to the Bergen company Rieber in 2003, after which pasta production was moved abroad in 2007 while still being sold in Norway under the Sopps brand, and the brand itself was sold to Lantmännen Cerealia in 2009. In 2012 the Elverum plant passed to Orkla, which used it largely as a regional warehouse and distribution center with some production.
