= Alexandrium tamarense =

Scientific classification
- Domain: Eukaryota
- Clade: Sar
- Clade: Alveolata
- Division: Dinoflagellata
- Class: Dinophyceae
- Order: Gonyaulacales
- Family: Ostreopsidaceae
- Genus: Alexandrium
- Species: A. tamarense

Binomial name
- Alexandrium tamarense (Lebour) Balech

Species of single-celled organism

Alexandrium tamarense is a dinoflagellate species complex known to produce saxitoxin, a neurotoxin which causes paralytic shellfish poisoning (PSP). Like other cyst forming Alexandrium species, its lifecycle includes vegetative motile cells, sexual stages, dormant resting cysts, and its blooms are shaped by environmental conditions such as temperature, nutrients, salinity, light, oxygen, and water movement. This species is important because its blooms impact marine food webs, human health, and coastal economies. However, tracking and identifying its blooms requires a combination of morphology-based and bloom-monitoring methods.

== History of Knowledge ==
The species now known as Alexandrium tamarense was first described by Lebour in 1925 from the Tamar River in southern England under the basionym Gonyaulax tamarensis Lebour. During the 20th century, the taxon moved through several taxonomic placements including Gonyaulax tamarensis, Protogonyaulax tamarensis, and Gesserium tamarensis, before being classified under the name Alexandrium tamarense (Lebour) Balech in 1995.

Before genetic analysis was standardized, classification within the genus relied heavily on morphology. Three classical morphospecies, A. tamarense, A. cantanella, and A. fundyense, were defined based on cell shape, chain forming ability, and the presence of a ventral pore. This framework shaped most of the older literature on bloom dynamics, distribution, and shellfish toxicity. Within the historical A. tamarense complex, these morphological characteristics proved more variable than once assumed, and intermediate forms were observed in both field material and cultured isolates.

A major turning point came when molecular studies in the 1990s and 2000s found that the historical morphospecies didn't correspond to distinct evolutionary lineages. This re-evaluation led to the recognition of five groups within the historical Alexandrium tamarense species complex, and eventually to the formal taxonomic revision in 2014. In that revision, the name Alexandrium tamarense was restricted to former Group III, tying the modern species concept to the Tamar estuary type locality. This change is important because much of the older literature that used the name Alexandrium tamarense actually refers to the broader historical species complex rather than the narrow modern species concept.

Later work also expanded knowledge of the species beyond taxonomy by examining its life cycle, especially the role of resting cysts in bloom formation and recurrence. Studies on bloom ecology demonstrated that salinity, temperature, nutrient availability, freshwater input, stratification, and meteorological conditions also help shape bloom development. Methods for tracking blooms include thecal plate staining, repeated cell counts, and long-term monitoring linked to environmental data.

At the same time, work on saxitoxin, paralytic shellfish poisoning, and bloom impacts showed that Alexandrium tamarense has major ecological, public-health and economic significance.

== Morphology ==
=== Cell structure ===
Alexandrium tamarense is a thecate dinoflagellate, and like other species in Alexandrium, it has an armoured cell covering composed of cellulose plates arranged in a characteristic pattern. Species of Alexandrium have a median cingulum that descends by about one cingular width, poorly developed cingular lists, and a thecal surface that is usually smooth, with an apical pore complex that may be either connected or disconnected from the first apical plates depending on the species. Within the historical Alexandrium tamarense complex, the shared Kofoidian plate formila has been one of the main reasons why the taxa classified within it were treated as closely related morphospecies, even though later work showed that these morphospecies didn't correspond to distinct evolutionary lineages.

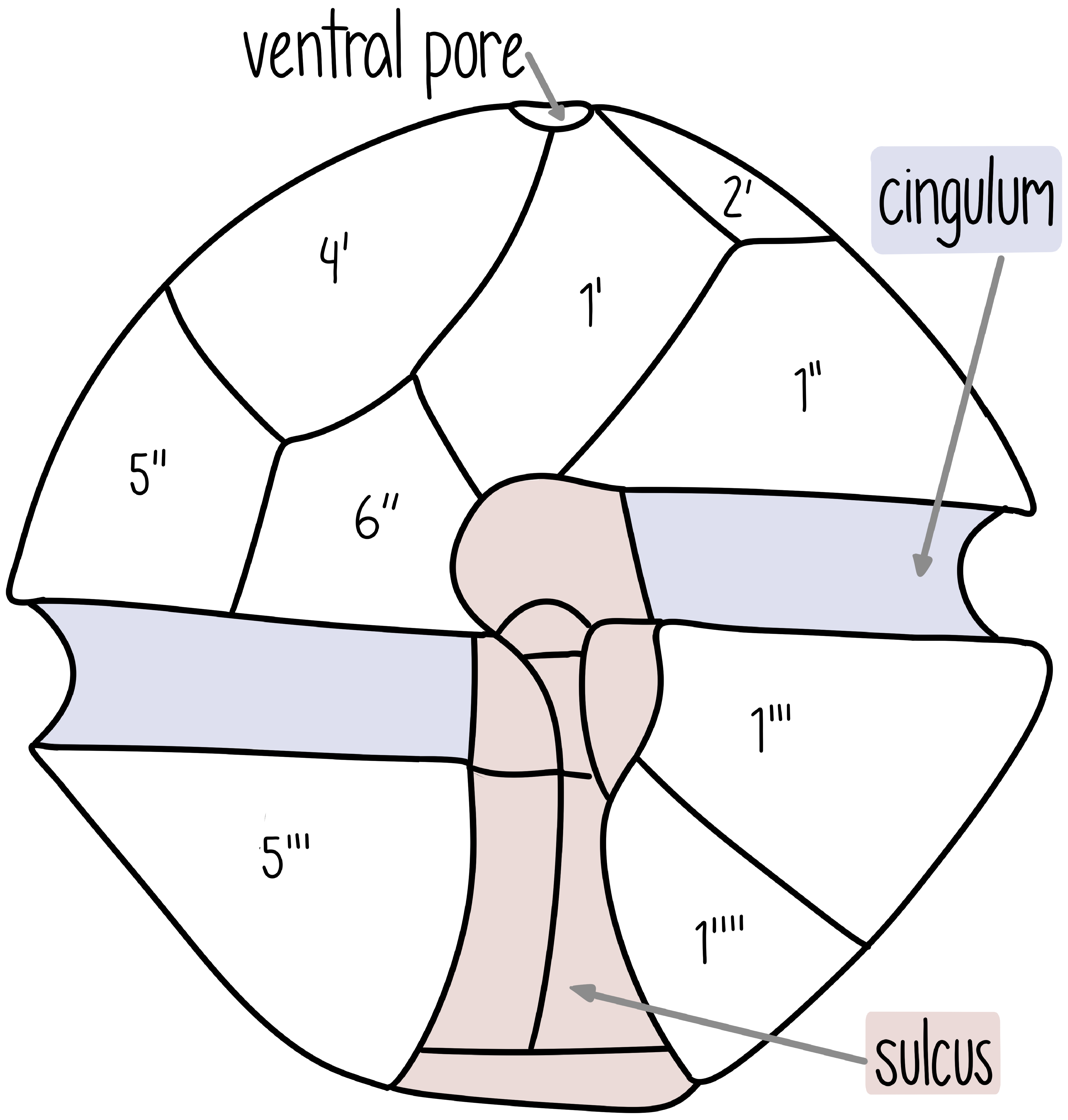
Alexandrium tamarense thecal structure (ventral view). Drawing based on published epifluorescence and scanning electron microscopy observations. Plates are numbered using the Kofoid tabulation system.

=== Thecal plates and external characters ===
Historically, members of the Alexandrium tamarense species complex were distinguished using external morphological characters such as cell shape, chain-forming ability, and the presence or absence of a ventral pore between plates 1' and 4', along with differences in sulcal and apical plate regions. These features shaped much of the older literature on A. tamarense, A. cantanella, and A. fundyense. Later field and culture studies found that these characters were more variable than previously assumed, with intermediate forms observed both in field samples and in culture, which weakened the usefulness of morphology based species-level identification within the complex.

=== Visualization of thecal plates ===
Because many of the external morphological characters of Alexandrium depend on the arrangement of thecal plates, practical identification has often relied on methods that make those plates easier to see using light microscopy. Calcoflour White staining became an important technique for visualizing dinoflagellate thecal plates because it binds to the plate material and allows the pattern to be observed clearly using epifluorescence microscopy. A study on the Alexandrium tamarense complex in Kuwait used Calcofluor-stained cells to distinguish among co-occurring morphotypes on the basis of plate pattern, ventral pore presence, apical pore complex structure, and sulcal plate characters, while showing that those morphological identifications should still be treated cautiously until confirmed by molecular data.

=== Ultrastructure ===
Detailed ultrastructural descriptions of Alexandrium tamarense are much less common compared to light-microscopy descriptions of thecal morphology, and most ultrastructural work on species referred to as A. tamarense predates the 2014 taxonomic revision, meaning that it belongs to the broader historical species complex. Even so, those ultrastructural studies are still important because they provide the clearest descriptions of the internal organization during the resting stages and show how stringly cyst morphology varies from vegetative morphology.

==== Hypnozygote organization ====
Transmission electron microscopy of hypnozygotes identified as A. tamarense showed that encystment is accompanied by major internal reorganization relative to the vegetive cells. In mature hypnozygotes, the cell contents were reduced and dominated by storage vesicles in a dense granular matrix, while chloroplasts, mitochondria, Golgi bodies, and endoplasmic reticulum lost their normal definition and appeared as whorls of undifferentiated membranes. The nucleus was also compressed and contained strongly condensed chromosomes, which is consistent with the interpretation of the resting stage as a dormant phase specialized for persistence rather than active metabolism and division. Transmission electron microscopy of mature hypnozygotes (hypnocysts) identified as toxic A. tamarense also showed a dinokaryon, chloroplasts, starch grains, an accumulation body, and intracellular crystals, but enclosed in a heavily modified cyst wall and covering.

==== Cyst wall structure ====
Direct ultrastructural descriptions of the cyst wall material come mainly from two studies published before the 2014 taxonomic revision. Transmission electron microscopy found that the hypnozygote is three layered in cross-section, with an outer electron-dense layer, a broad middle layer of striated material, and a narrow inner layer near the cell membrane. Their energy-dispersive X-ray spectroscopy of the cyst wall further indicated that sulphur and silica were the principal components detected in the cyst wall surface. Transmission electron microscopy of hypnocysts identified as toxic A. tamarense found an even more elaborate wall, including multiple rigid internal layers, a filamentous surface covering, and a sticky layer to which bacteria and other particles adhered. Together, these studies indicate that the resting cyst stage has highly specialized wall architecture likely related to persistence in sediments and resistance to unfavourable conditions.

===== Bacteria in cyst-related stages =====
Bacteria have been reported from several Alexandrium life-cycle stages, but the evidence is limited and uneven across field and culture studies. Transmission electron microscopy of field material identified as A. tamarense found intracytoplasmic bacteria in early and mature hypnocysts and extracellular bacteria attached to the outer cyst covering. In that study, intracellular bacteria were not observed in vegetative cells from the same field material. In contrast, microscopy analysis of cultured Alexandrium found bacteria associated with vegetative cells, planozygotes, cysts, and planomeiocytes, and transmission electron microscopy indicated bacteria within vegetative cells as well as sexual and cyst related stages. Other microscopy-based studies have shown that while bacteria are commonly associated with Alexandrium more broadly, they do not demonstrate intracellular bacteria in hypnocysts. Because the available evidence comes from relatively few studies, the biological significance of these bacteria remains unresolved.

== Phylogenetics ==
Ribosomal markers, especially LSU, SSU, and ITS regions, played a central role in taxonomic reinterpretation of the historical Alexandrium tamarense complex because they showed that the traditional morphospecies did not form discrete monophyletic groups. Molecular studies in the 1990s identified five phylogenetic ribotypes (North American, Western European, Temperate Asian, Tasmanian, Tropical Asian) that disagreed with the species boundaries proposed by the historical morphospecies. LSU rDNA data found that the three historical morphospecies did not satisfy phylogenetic, biological, or morphological species concepts and suggested that the historical morphospecies names within the concept should be discontinued. Instead, the study recognized five well supported groups (Groups I-V) and developed a numbered scheme because the older geographically named ribotypes had become misleading. SSU based work then showed strong intragenomic polymorphism in the small-subunit rDNA of some strains, and that ignoring this variation may inflate estimates of diversity in bloom samples. This SSU based analysis divided the historical morphospecies into two distinct clades and linked those clades to the five groups recognized by Lilly and colleagues. Uwe and colleagues then formalized the revision in 2014 by assigning Group I to A. fundyense, Group II to A. mediterraneum, Group III to A. tamarense, Group IV to A. pacificum, and Group V to A. australiense.

Following the 2014 taxonomic revision, the name Alexandrium tamarense applies specifically to former Group III. Uwe et al. linked that assignment to the Tamar estuary type locality, and reported that Group III isolates known at that time were non-toxic. Klemm and colleagues emphasized how important this revision was for interpreting the record from northern Europe, because many older light-microscopy reports of A. tamarense likely included what is now recognized as A. catenella or other members of the complex.

Gene level analysis provided a functional perspective on interpretation of the complex. Stüken and colleagues showed that saxitoxin related genes such as sxtA are encoded in the nuclear genome rather than only in associated bacteria. They also found strong overall agreement between the presence of genomic sxtA and saxitoxin production, although they noted a few strains identified at the time as A. tamarense in which sxtA was detected but toxin was not. Those strains predate and therefore do not necessarily follow the 2014 revision, they should be interpreted cautiously when discussing the modern concept of A. tamarense.

== Lifecycle ==
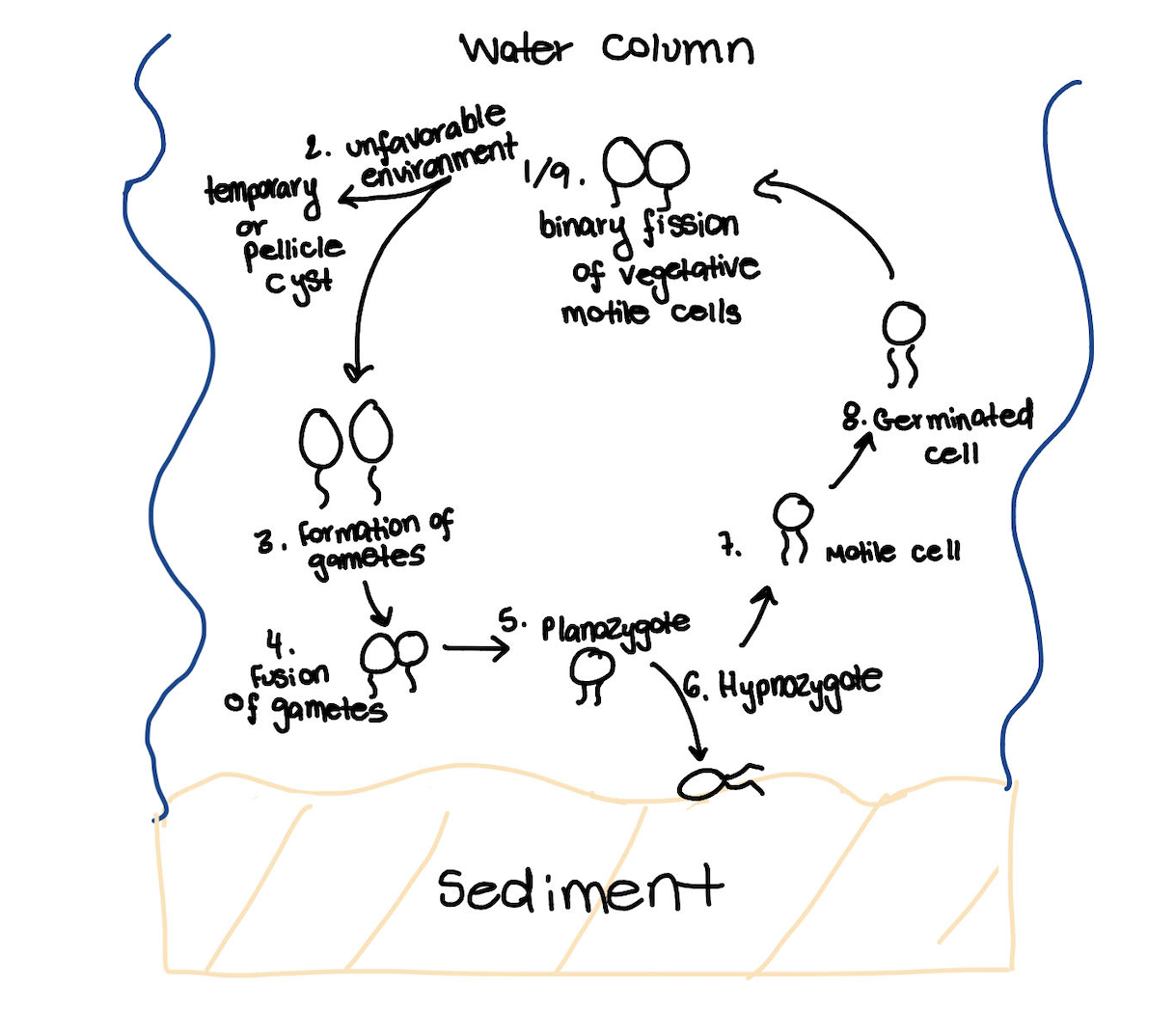
Lifecycle of Alexandrium tamarense. Hand drawn diagram.

There are nine stages in the lifecycle of Alexandrium tamarense with transitions throughout the lifecycle between asexual and sexual reproduction. The first stage is the replication of vegetative motile cells through binary fission. Next, if environmental conditions are unfavorable, cells may enter a resting state called a temporary or pellicle cyst. This resting stage allows the cells to withstand short term unfavorable environmental conditions. When environmental conditions become favorable again cells will exit this resting stage and become vegetative and motile and ready to enter the sexual reproduction stages of the lifecycle. Formation of female and male gametes terminates asexual reproduction and facilitates sexual reproduction. The male and female gametes then fuse together to produce a swimming zygote also known as a planozygote. After formation of the planozygote the planozygote becomes a hypnozygote which is a dormant cyst. In the dormancy stage the hypnozygote is found in the sediment and serves as an inoculum population for bloom formation whereas when cells are vegetative and motile they inhabit the water column. Transforming into a dormant cyst allows Alexandrium tamarense to endure harsh environmental conditions that would negatively impact vegetative growth. During the dormancy or hypnozygote stage A. tamarense has low metabolic activity and germination is not possible. The dormancy stage is mandatory for Alexandrium cysts to mature in order to germinate, initiate a bloom, and then enter the final stage of the lifecycle which is asexual reproduction using binary fission to produce more vegetative cells. Bloom initiation is dependent on exiting of the dormancy or hypnozygote stage to the germination stage, which is impacted by many factors including endogenous and environmental.

=== Ecology ===
The most prominent grazers of A. tamarense are small heterotrophs including microzooplankton like the tintinnid ciliate Favella taraikaensis , other heterotrophic dinoflagellates such as Oxyrrhis marina, Gyrodinium dominans, Polykrikos kofoidii, and Strombidinopsis spp., as well as larger zooplankton, such as copepods (Calanus helgolandicus, Acartia clausii, and Oithona similis). In the open ocean, these grazers play the important role of regulating the growth of A. tamarense populations, preventing overgrowth and eutrophication as well as potential toxin blooms. However, it has been found that many Alexandrium species respond to grazing cues with elevated toxin production of their own, in an apparent defense mechanism. These cues and responses, however, are species-specific and cannot be generalized for the grazer community as a whole. For A. tamarense, this has led to something of an evolutionary arms-race, wherein some copepod grazers appear themselves to have developed an immunity to saxitoxin to continue their grazing without consequence.

Another group of A. tamarense consumers are the filter-feeding bivalves. Due to the mechanism of filter feeding, bivalves like mussels, scallops, and clams are nondiscriminate consumers, with the main factor regulating their diet is the size of filtered particles. Because of this, high levels of toxin can accumulate in bivalve tissues, which ultimately leads to transmission of saxitoxin to marine food webs and beyond. Among intertidal organisms, the BC Centre for Disease Control specifically outlines clams, mussels, whelks, moon-shells, dogwinkles, oysters, whole scallops, crabs and lobster as some of the most dangerous species to avoid eating during bloom periods. The effect of saxitoxin varies significantly between species, with some shellfish having very rapid detoxification times while others can retain dangerous levels of saxitoxin for months to years.

Ecologically, the implications of an A. tamarense bloom and the injection of saxitoxin into the foundation of ecosystems can have drastic effects on food webs in general. In zooplanktivore populations of fish, filter feeders, and even whales, as well as their predators, even low levels of toxicity in primary consumers can accumulate and have serious, even lethal consequences. In July 1976, a massive kill of herring was determined to have been caused by A. tamarense toxicity, with repeat incidents identified with markedly fast mortality from toxins accumulated through zooplankton grazing. In the St Lawrence Estuary, a 2008 bloom of A. tamarense was linked to mass mortality of beluga, seals, porpoises, birds, and fish. The potential for loss of predator populations has the potentially to completely reshape marine systems and food web dynamics.

== Geography ==
Several studies have recorded Alexandrium tamarense in multiple locations around the world, with higher populations favouring temperate waters. This species is not restricted to any specific ocean basin or sea region. In North America, it has been documented in several Canadian and American waters, including the Strait of Georgia (British Columbia, Canada), the Gulf of St. Lawrence (Quebec, Canada), and the Gulf of Maine (Maine, USA). Outside North America, strains have also been recorded in coastal Japan, with recurrent algal blooms in Hiroshima Bay (Japan). Populations have also been found off the coast of Europe, and within the Southern Hemisphere, with populations existing off the coast of Argentina, New Zealand, and Australia.

=== Environmental Conditions ===
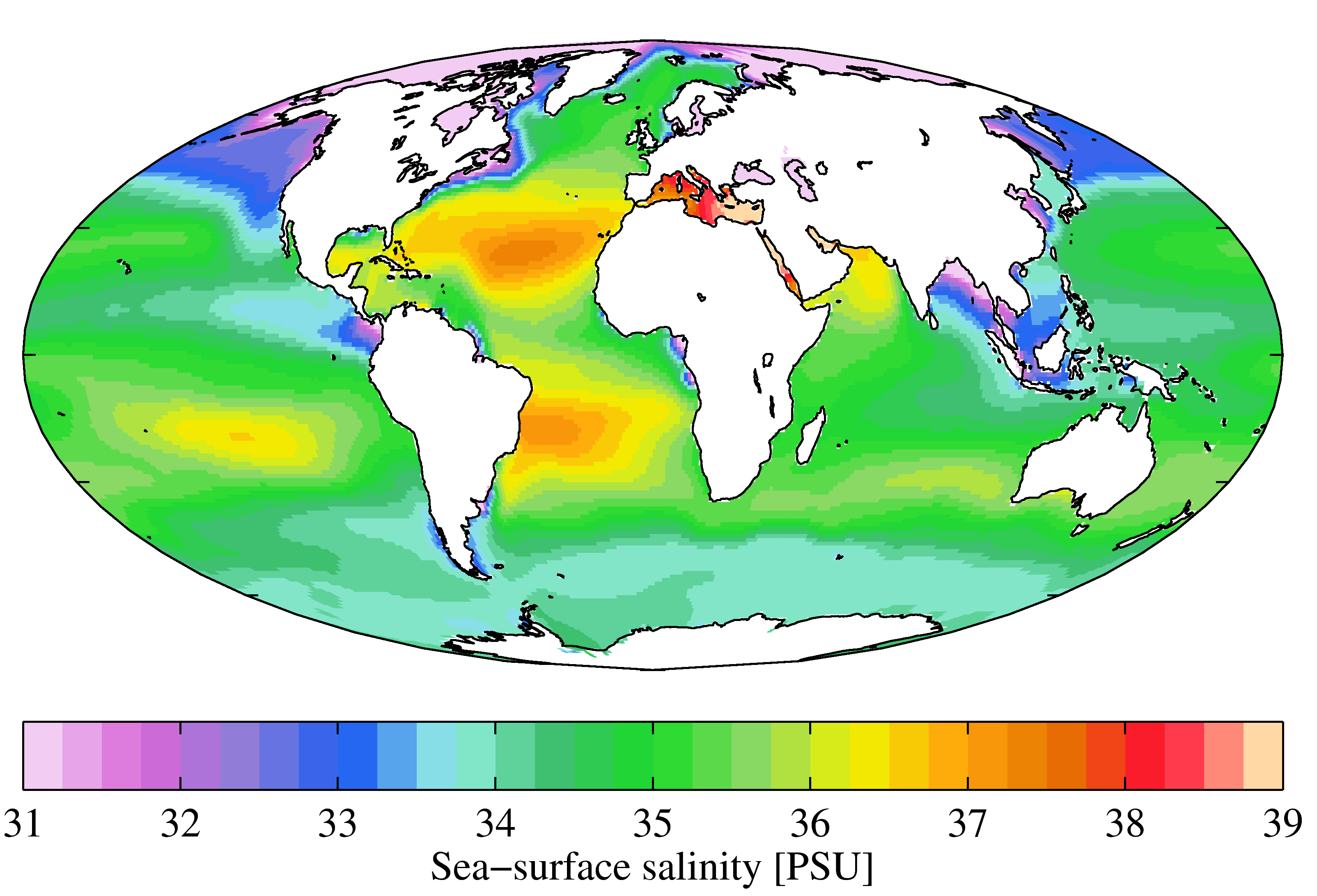
Annual Mean Sea-Surface Salinity (PSU) in 2009

==== Salinity ====
Alexandrium tamarense concentrations have been found in temperate brackish waters around coastal environments. The dinoflagellate has been linked to thriving in regions with freshwater input, increased stratification, and increased nutrients. Research done within the St. Lawrence estuary suggests that there is a strong correlation between low salinity, high freshwater input, and strong bloom development. Weise et al., 2002 suggest the same outcome accounting for average cell growth over a 10-year period, stating that bloom development is often associated with conditions where river water input lowers surface salinity and increases the stratification of the water column. Stratification allows for stable conditions within a water column, allowing for favourable conditions to remain long enough for bloom growth. Weise et al., 2002 suggest that a salinity percentage of 20-26% correlated with the highest A. tamarense cell concentrations. The annual mean sea-surface salinity in 2009 map from the World Ocean Atlas showcases relatively low salinity levels in the St. Lawrence Estuary and across several of the other locations listed above.

==== Temperature ====
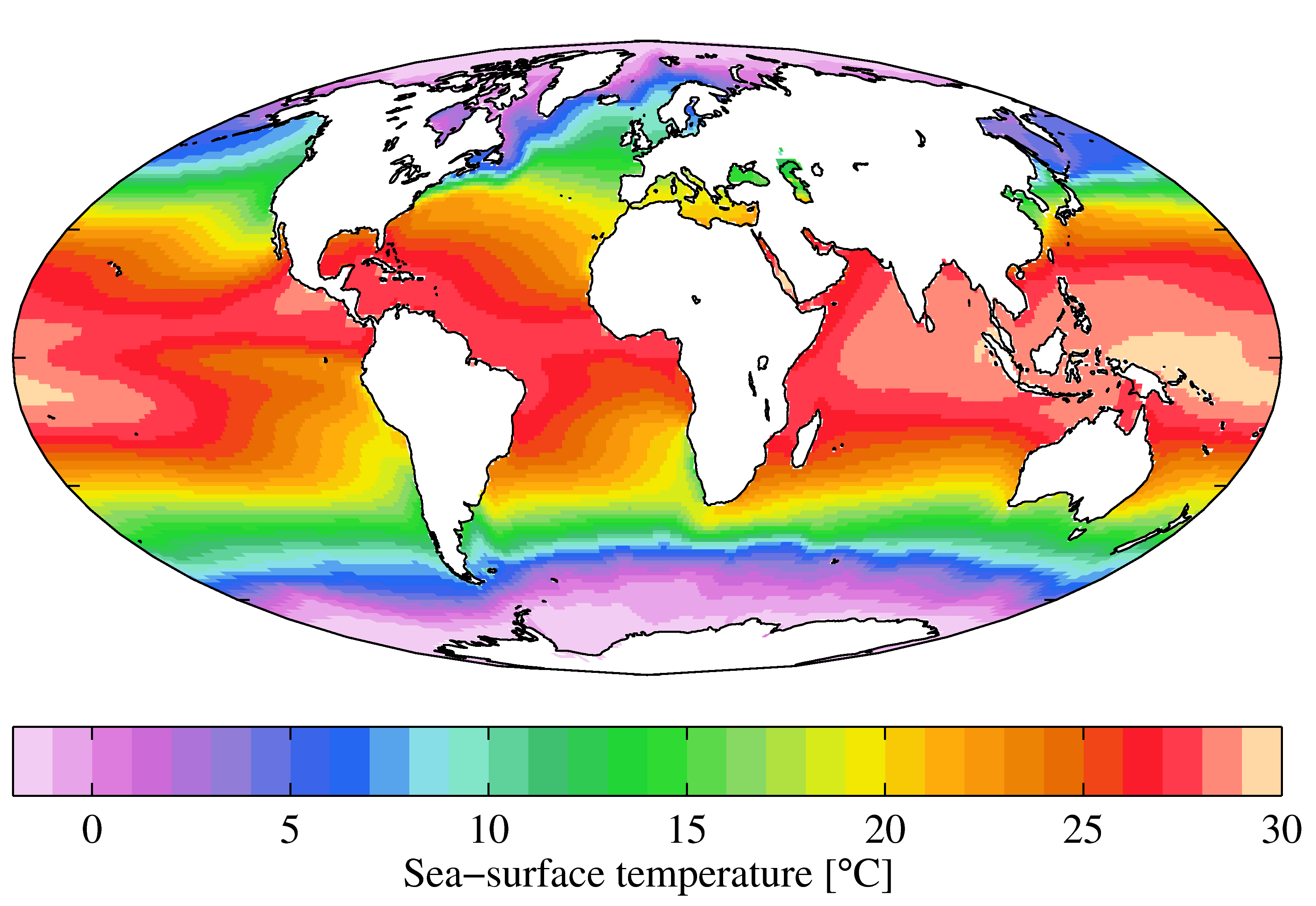
Annual Mean Sea-Surface Temperatures (°C) in 2009

Temperature has additionally been found to be a control for Alexandrium tamarense blooms. Peak A. tamarense cell concentrations were found in warmer waters > 12°C. Temperate areas with strong seasonal warming often provide the ideal conditions for bloom growth within the summer season. Locations such as the Strait of Georgia, the Gulf of St. Lawrence, and Hiroshima Bay all experience strong seasonal warming patterns that are able to support bloom growth. The map showcases the annual mean sea-surface temperatures in degrees Celsius from the World Ocean Atlas 2009. Warm annual sea-surface temperatures are recorded along the coast of Argentina and Maine, USA.

==== Meteorological Conditions ====
Specific meteorological conditions have been shown to play a role in bloom intensity. Studies have shown a correlation between periods of high river runoff, increased precipitation, and A. tamarense cell concentration growth. It is not determined whether the impacts freshwater has on salinity and stratification or the increase in available nutrients is the cause for this increase in cell concentration. Studies have also shown that low wind conditions are ideal for cell growth, as the reduction of turbidity allows for ideal conditions to remain for cell growth. In the St. Lawrence estuary, cell growth was seen to occur with wind speeds around 3.3 ± 1.8 m/s with disruption occurring at wind speeds > 7 m/s. These strong winds likely disturb stratification, causing the dispersal of cell concentrations and nutrients needed for cell growth. This can also have an impact on salinity and temperature, causing issues with vertical migration patterns. Periods of high precipitation on a day-to-day scale was correlated to high A. tamarense cell counts as well. The initiation of bloom development in the St. Lawrence estuary is characteristically prior to heavy rainfall events occurring at the beginning of spring and fall.

==== Nutrient Variability ====
Studies have shown a correlation between nutrient availability and Alexandrium tamarense cell growth. In the St. Lawrence estuary, a link was established between A. tamarense growth and nitrogen, phosphorus, and ammonium concentrations, suggesting that these nutrients are the most vital to support A. tamarense development. Fauchot et al., 2005 state that a nitrogen-phosphorus ratio below the Redfield Ratio (N:P=16) was the most favourable for increased cell abundance, and a non-linear relationship was established between phosphate concentrations and A. tamarense growth rates. Results from the St. Lawrence estuary suggest that phosphate-controlled growth rates, while nitrogen controlled the number of divisions achieved by A. tamarense.

Humic substances may influence bloom growth, suggesting that terrestrial coastal waters can create conditions favourable for growth. Weise et al., 2002 suggest that the nutrients, nitrogen, phosphorus, and ammonium are easily replenished within these areas due to high freshwater runoff and high nutrient input. Fauchot et al., 2005 suggest that salinity has a greater impact on Alexandrium tamarense cell abundance than nutrient availability.

Nutrient availability can impact PSP toxicity. A relationship between toxin concentration and nitrogen availability was found by MacIntyre et al.,1997 where toxin concentrations were found to increase with greater nitrogen-stratification. Minimal nitrogen concentration near-surface and higher deep nitrogen concentration levels resulted in this toxin increase, proving that A. tamarense uses diel vertical migration to obtain nutrients.

=== Methods to Measure Blooms ===
To track Alexandrium tamarense blooms, methods were focused primarily on tracking changes in cell abundance and cell growth rates. Repeated cell counts were conducted across different sites, seasons, and years to determine bloom rates and distribution. Cell counts found over prolonged periods performed by Weise et al., 2002 were used to compare hydrological and meteorological conditions to determine environmental controls on phytoplankton blooms. Lilly et al., 2007 measure bloom development to find A. tamarense species boundaries. To find nutrient dependencies, MacIntyre et al., 1997 used a controlled laboratory environment and changes in nutrient availability to measure the impacts on A. tamarense toxin concentration and growth rates. Long-term monitoring, cell count monitoring, and species distribution are common techniques for analysis.

==== Thau lagoon, Southern France Bloom Dynamics ====
An environment that experiences consistent blooms of A. tamarense is Thau lagoon, France. To determine the optimal environmental conditions that facilitate A. tamarense bloom formation Genovesi et al., 2009 used laboratory produced cysts and compared germination patterns and germling cell viability to natural cysts from Thau lagoon, France. It was found that during the dormancy stage cysts survive due to living in sediments during the winter and that there is no requirement for vernalization. Then resuspension of cysts into the photic zone away from anoxic sediment conditions promotes bloom seeding. The resuspension is thought to be triggered by windy periods that also restore dissolved oxygen saturation in the water column during spring and summer. Hadjadji et al., 2014 found that there is a connection between inorganic phosphorus limitation and germination of A. tamarense cells to initiate blooms in Thau Lagoon, France.

==== St. Lawrence Estuary Bloom Dynamics ====
The St. Lawrence estuary in eastern Canada experiences recurrent A. tamarense blooms. One of the important relationships that contribute to bloom formation are cyst germination and estuarine circulation. Fauchot et al., 2008 found that A. tamarense blooms that develop near the north shore of the estuary get transported to the south shore via the Manicouagan and Aux-Outardes plume and that the plume remaining along the north shore for several days could be a pre-requisite for development of blooms.

==== Chukchi Sea shelf Bloom Dynamics: Impact of Global Warming ====
In the Chukchi Sea Shelf it was discovered using in vitro cyst germination experiments that cell growth and cyst germination increased with warmer water temperatures and that winter formed water of the Chukchi Sea Shelf inhibits effective germination. This finding led Natsuike et al., 2017 to infer that A. tamarense blooms could occur with future warming, which can have impacts on animal taxa in the Chukchi Sea Shelf.

== Saxitoxin ==
=== Paralytic Shellfish Poisoning ===
Saxitoxin is a potent neurotoxin produced by A. tamarense, marine dinoflagellates, freshwater or brackish water cyanobacteria and is the causative agent of paralytic shellfish poisoning. It is a part of the paralytic shellfish toxins group and has a tricyclic structure with a biguanide group. Its mechanism of action is blocking sodium ion influx into voltage gated sodium channels which prevents nerve impulse transmission, and can cause serious physiological problems in the nervous, respiratory, cardiovascular and digestive systems. The neurotoxin has a minimum lethal dose of 1-4mg/kg and a median lethal dose of 10ug/kg.

Symptoms of paralytic shellfish poisoning according to the BC CDC are:

- Tingling
- Numbness spreading from lips and mouth to face, neck and extremities
- Dizziness
- Arm and leg weakness
- Paralysis
- Headache
- Nausea
- Vomiting
- Respiratory failure and in severe cases death

Paralytic shellfish poisoning can occur from eating at risk shellfish, and or contaminated seafood. The median time between ingestion and onset of symptoms is 1 hour. There are no known available treatments or drugs to treat paralytic shellfish poisoning.

=== Production of saxitoxin ===
A. tamarense toxin profile

There are 57 known types of saxitoxin (called analogs) that vary slightly based on their level of toxicity and R- group structure. Broadly, the categories of toxin found in A. tamarense are grouped as: Non-sulfated (STX, neoSTX), mono-sulfated gonyautotoxins (GTX 1-6), decarbamylated (dcneoSTX), and di-sulfated (C1,C2) in order of toxicity. The saxitoxin profile of A. tamarense (and all Alexandrium spp.) can vary significantly, but is mainly dominated by C2 and GTX4 types. Both the composition and amount of saxitoxin in each cell are variable, with concentrations ranging from 40 to 120 fmol/cell.

Regulation of saxitoxin synthesis

Production of saxitoxin in A. tamarense has several levels of regulation that have been described; however, the complete process remains unknown. Some of the genes which have been identified in the saxitoxin synthesis/release pathways are described in the table below.

Core synthesis	These genes and enzymes with which they are associated are responsible for building the base structure of non-substituted saxitoxin.	Genes: sxtA, stxB, stxD, stxG, stxH, stxT, stxF, stxU
Tailoring	These genes and enzymes carry out the substitution of functional groups that transform STX into various analog toxins through processes like decarbamoylation, N-sulfotransfer, and N1-hydroxylation. The specific proteins involved at each step and for all substitutions are yet to be identified.	Genes: sxtL, stxN, stxX
Regulation	Specific genes that regulate saxitoxin production through in A. tamarense have not yet been identified.	Genes: unknown
Transportation	These genes and enzymes are responsible for controlling the release of saxitoxin from A. tamarense cells during a toxic bloom event.	Genes: sxtF, stxM, stxP

==== Indirect metabolic associations with saxitoxin production ====
Apart from these specific genes that are directly associated with the biosynthesis pathway, elevated levels of cellular toxins have been found in association with genes and proteins involved in primary metabolic functions. This suggests that for A. tamarense, it is not unlikely that the production of saxitoxin is concurrent with and supported by the process of digestion and photosynthesis, but the specific factors causing this linkage remain undescribed.

==== Impact of nutrients on saxitoxin production ====
Based on the association of saxitoxin production with the nutritional status of A. tamarense, it's thought that nutrient availability plays a significant role in the limitation and amplification of saxitoxin production as well as the growth and development of A. tamarense blooms. A 2015 study demonstrated that for a culture of the A. tamarense strain CI01, collected from the South China Sea, that nitrogen is a much more important nutrient to saxitoxin production than phosphate. Under phosphate-limiting conditions, growth slows as DNA synthesis and cell division are halted (due to the high P-demand of DNA's phosphate backbone and the phospholipid bilayer). However, this causes intracellular toxin levels to accumulate, since the production of saxitoxin is not slowed. This also implies that the maximum concentration of toxin is partially limited by the speed of cell division.

== Economic Impact of Harmful Algal Blooms ==
Harmful algal blooms created by A. tamarense can have significant negative economic impacts on the shellfish industry. In the Korean aquaculture industry there has been a loss of US $121 million during the last 3 decades due to harmful algal blooms. In the United States harmful algal blooms have estimated annual costs of $50 million with the following industries spending annually: public health $20 million, commercial fisheries $18 million, $7 million for recreation and tourism impacts, and $2 million for monitoring and management.
