= Wilhelm Sissener =

Belgian-born military leader

Wilhelm Sissener (30 April 1779 - 29 December 1846) was an Austrian Netherlands-born military leader. He is the originator of the Sissener family of Norway.

== Biography ==
Colonel Guilliame Sissener was born in Brussels in 1779.

He started his military career as a soldier in Napoleon Bonaparte's army in 1799. After being captured by the Russians, he escaped in 1807 and joined the Royal Danish Lifeguard in Copenhagen. In January 1808, Sissener was promoted to Lieutenant with the 1st. National Infantry Regiment at Trondheim. This is when he took the name Wilhelm, the Norwegian equivalent of Guilliame.

In 1810, another soldier of Napoleon, Jean-Baptiste Bernadotte (1763–1844), was elected King of Sweden, and took the name Karl Johan. In 1814, France's ally Denmark was forced to give Norway up to Sweden.

Sissener benefitted from his common origin with the new King, and rose quickly in the military ranks. In 1814, he was promoted Captain and in 1818 Sissener was transferred to the 1st Akershus Brigade (Akershusiske infanteribrigade). He moved into the historic site of Brensmork in Eidsvoll with his wife Maren Hals, the daughter of a highly ranked soldier.

In April 1837, Wilhelm Sissener became Commandant of Kongsvinger Fortress, and two years later he was promoted to Colonel.

During his life at Brensmork, the Sissener family made close ties to the Wergeland family. The famous Norwegian poet Henrik Wergeland mentions several members of the Sissener family in his poems.

Sissener and King Karl Johan were good friends, and when the King visited Christiania (now Oslo), Sissener was always by his side.

=== Marriage and children ===
He moved into the historic site of Brensmork in Eidsvoll with his wife Maren Hals, the daughter of a highly ranked soldier.

The couple had eleven children:

1. George Fredrik von Krogh Sissener (1809–1851)
2. Philip Jacob Johannes Sissener (1811–1883)
3. Anna Hedvig Wilhelmine Sissener (1814–1898)
4. Ulrik Fredrik Sissener (1816–1853)
5. Johanne (Hanna) Elisabeth Caroline Sissener (1818–1891)
6. Laura Eleonora Bernhardine Sissener (1820–1881)
7. Mathilde Dorthea Eugenia Sissener (1820–1887)
8. Peter Johan Brandt Sissener (1822–1885)
9. Joseph Frantz Oscar Sissener (1824–1881)
10. Alexander Eliseus Laurentius Boutet Sissener (1826–1896)
11. Peder Lykke Elisar Wolfgang Sissener (1831–1906)

=== Death and afterward ===
Wilhelm Sissener died 29 December 1846. He is buried in Eidsvoll cemetery.
