= Theodore J. Smayda =

American oceanographer

Theodore J. Smayda (1931 – April 5, 2017) was an American oceanographer.

He was born in Peckville, Pennsylvania. He was employed at the University of Rhode Island in 1959. He later won a Fulbright Scholarship to travel to Norway and study at the University of Oslo, where he took the dr.philos. degree. His defense of his doctoral thesis took place in the Norwegian language. The thesis regarded phytoplankton in the Panama Gulf; the opponents were Trygve Braarud and Odd Henrik Sælen. Following his stay in Norway, Smayda returned to the University of Rhode Island where he served as a professor of oceanography throughout his career.

He was a fellow of the Norwegian Academy of Science and Letters from 1992. Limnology & Oceanography found his article "Harmful algal blooms: Their ecophysiology and general relevance to phytoplankton blooms in the sea" to be one of the top 60 most cited between 1956 and 2016.

He was married and resided in Jamestown, Rhode Island. He died in April 2017 at the age of 85.
