= Alexandrium monilatum =

Scientific classification
- Domain: Eukaryota
- Clade: Diaphoretickes
- Clade: SAR
- Clade: Alveolata
- Phylum: Myzozoa
- Superclass: Dinoflagellata
- Class: Dinophyceae
- Order: Gonyaulacales
- Family: Ostreopsidaceae
- Genus: Alexandrium
- Species: A. monilatum

Binomial name
- Alexandrium monilatum (J.F.Howell) Balech

Synonyms
- Gonyaulax monilata J.F.Howell; Gessnerium mochimaensis Halim; Gessnerium monilatum (Howell) A.R.Loebl.; Pyrodinium monilatum (Howell) F.J.R.Taylor

Species of single-celled organism

Alexandrium monilatum is a species of armored, photosynthetic, marine dinoflagellates. It produces toxins that, when present in high concentrations as "red tides", can kill fish and reduce growth rates of shellfish.

== Distribution and habitat ==
Alexandrium monilatum is a planktonic species found in tropical to warm temperate coastal seas and estuaries of the Americas. The species description is based on material from the Indian River Lagoon on the Atlantic Coast of Florida.

== Description ==
Alexandrium monilatum are armored or thecate dinoflagellates with an outer cell wall covered with cellulose plates. A. monilatum is wider at the cingulum or equatorial girdle than it is tall, and it commonly joins into chains of from two to sixteen individuals, with chains as long as 32 cells in calm seas. The cingulum or groove halfway between the top and bottom of the organism's single cell is where the pair of flagella are situated. To form chains, A. monilatum cells exude a glue from the apical or top attachment pore of one individual to make it adhere to the antapical or bottom attachment pore of the next individual in the chain. Organisms produced in laboratory cultures do not usually form chains. The nucleus is located in the center of the cell, and A. minilatum's many chloroplasts radiate outward from the nucleus. A bioluminescent strain of A. monilatum has been identified from Mississippi Sound in the Gulf of Mexico.

== Life cycle ==
Alexandrium monilatum reproduces both asexually and sexually. Asexual reproduction is by binary fission. Though less common than fission, A. monilatum also reproduces sexually. This takes place when a zygote is formed by the fusing of the two isogametes and resting cysts may be formed.

== Toxicity ==
Like other dinoflagellates, Alexandrium monilatum has wide swings in population size. When concentrations rise, algal blooms occur and fish can be killed by the ichthyotoxin, goniodomin A identified in both A. monilatum and A. pseudogoniaulax. Secondary toxic substances produced by this species include saxitoxins and gonyautoxins. Toxic red tides caused by this species have caused large fish kills off the coasts of Texas, Florida and Venezuela. This dinoflagellate does not cause mortality in adult shellfish but does reduce nutritional uptake as well as increasing mortality in larvae.
