= Åge Standal Holter =

Norwegian forester

Åge Standal Holter (19 January 1919 – 3 May 2008) was a Norwegian historian of religion.

He was born in Ålesund. He took the dr.theol. degree in 1958, and after a decade each at the Norwegian Bible Society and the Norwegian College of Teaching, he was a professor at the MF School of Theology from 1974 to 1986. Writing about Christianity and Islam, he issued such books as Det Norske Bibelselskap gjennom 150 år (1966) and Arabisk statsreligion (1976).

He was inducted into the Norwegian Academy of Science and Letters in 1979.
