= Ann-Mari Aasland =

Norwegian politician (1915–2008)

deputy representative to the Parliament of Norway
- In office 1973–1977
- Constituency: Telemark

Personal details
- Born: 7 June 1915
- Died: 8 August 2008 (aged 93)
- Political party: Conservative Party

Ann-Mari Aasland (7 June 1915 – 8 August 2008) was a Norwegian politician for the Conservative Party.

She served as a deputy representative to the Parliament of Norway from Telemark during the term 1973–1977. In total she met during 5 days of parliamentary session. She was a housewife in Skien.
