= Einar W. Sissener =

Norwegian businessperson

Einar W. Sissener (10 February 1929 – 22 June 2008) was a Norwegian businessperson, known as CEO of Alpharma.

His grandfather founded the pharmacy company Apothekernes Laboratorium in 1903. Sissener took over the leadership of the company from his father, Wilhelm Sissener. A sister company A.L. Laboratories Inc was established in the United States in 1975, and listed on the American Stock Exchange in 1984. Apothekernes Laboratorium was listed on the New York Stock Exchange in 1989. The companies were merged, and the name changed to Alpharma, in 1994. Sissener retired as CEO in 2000; from 2000 to 2006 he was chairman of the board.

Sissener was active in sport sailing, sometimes sailing on the boat of King Harald V. His own sailboat was named "Al Capone".

He died at the age of 79 at Ullevål University Hospital.
