= Calcofluor-white =

Fluorescent blue dye

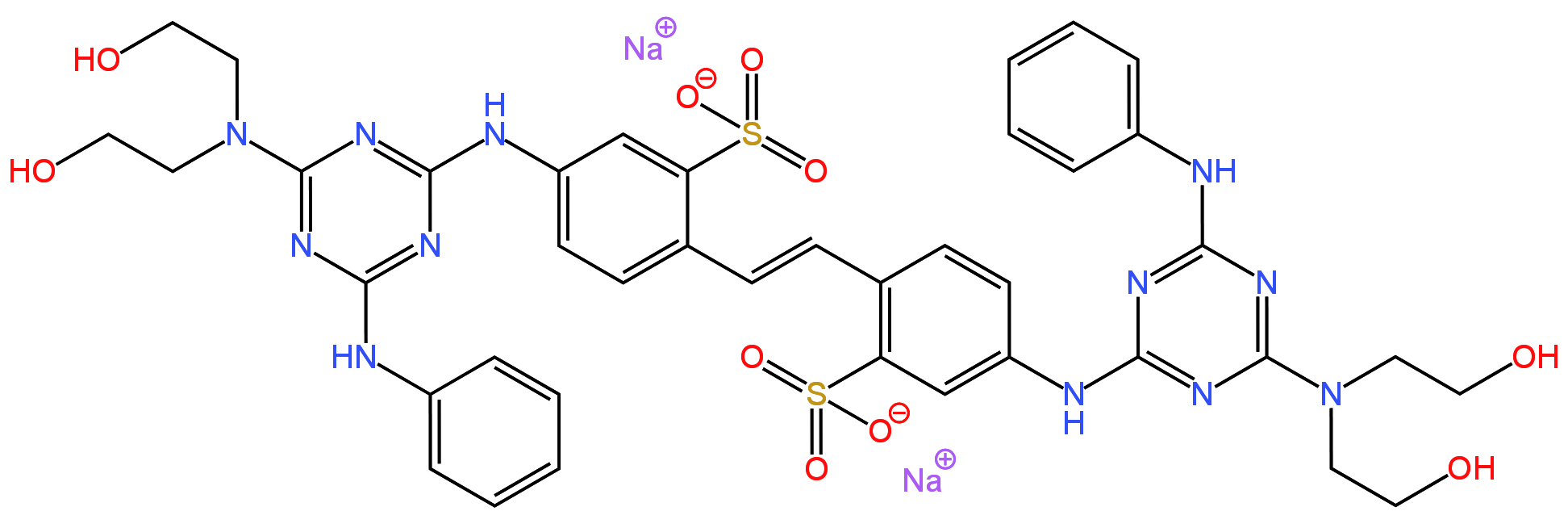

Names
- IUPAC name disodium 2,2'-ethene-1,2-diylbis[5-({4-anilino-6-[bis(2-hydroxyethyl)amino]-1,3,5-triazin-2-yl}amino)benzenesulfonate]
- Other names Fluorescent Brightener 28, Calcofluor White M 2R

Identifiers
CAS Number	4193-55-9
3D model (JSmol)	Interactive image
ChEBI	CHEBI:50011
ChemSpider	39215
ECHA InfoCard	100.021.885
PubChem CID	43030
UNII	11V30J47QK
CompTox Dashboard (EPA)	DTXSID9044669
- InChI: InChI=1S/C40H44N12O10S2.2Na/c53-21-17-51(18-22-54)39-47-35(41-29-7-3-1-4-8-29)45-37(49-39)43-31-15-13-27(33(25-31)63(57,58)59)11-12-28-14-16-32(26-34(28)64(60,61)62)44-38-46-36(42-30-9-5-2-6-10-30)48-40(50-38)52(19-23-55)20-24-56;;/h1-16,25-26,53-56H,17-24H2,(H,57,58,59)(H,60,61,62)(H2,41,43,45,47,49)(H2,42,44,46,48,50);;/q;2*+1/p-2 Key: YJHDFAAFYNRKQE-UHFFFAOYSA-L
- SMILES: [Na+].[Na+].[H]C(=C([H])c1ccc(Nc2nc(Nc3ccccc3)nc(n2)N(CCO)CCO)cc1S([O-])(=O)=O)c1ccc(Nc2nc(Nc3ccccc3)nc(n2)N(CCO)CCO)cc1S([O-])(=O)=O

Properties
Chemical formula	C_{40}H_{42}N_{12}Na_{2}O_{10}S_{2}
Molar mass	960.95 g·mol^{−1}
- Except where otherwise noted, data are given for materials in their standard state (at 25 °C [77 °F], 100 kPa). Infobox references

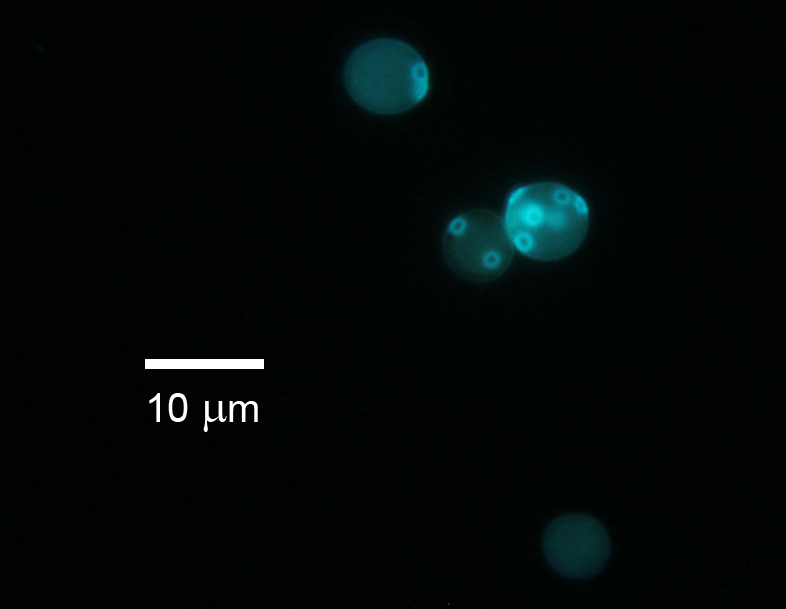
The fluorescent staining of yeast with calcofluor-white. The cell walls fluoresce to a vivid blue color.

Calcofluor-white or CFW is a fluorescent blue dye used in biology and textiles. It binds to 1–3 beta and 1–4 beta polysaccharides that are present in the cell walls of fungi, plants, and protozoa. In plant cell biology research, it is used for the staining of cell walls of both algae and higher plants. It is also useful in medicine as a sensitive tool for the visualization and identification of fungi in biopsy samples.

== Usage ==
=== Medicine ===
CFW can be used in both clinical mycology and parasitology. Pathogenic free-living amoebae can form cysts that can be vividly seen with the stain. CFW can be used with the Papanicolaou stain to help strengthen the response of yeasts in Pap smears.

=== Research ===
In research, calcofluor-white is also used to stain bud scars of yeast cells because the bud scars have a higher content of chitin, which stains them more than the rest of the cell membrane. Due to this stain, it is possible to count the bud scars which is an indication for the age of the cell. It shows similar staining patterns as wheat germ agglutinin (WGA), which bind N-acetylglucosamine and sialic acid on polysaccharides. It is especially useful for the diagnosis of mucormycosis. Calcofluor-white can be used to stain thecal plates in armoured dinoflagellates.

=== Textiles ===
CFW is a fabric brightening dye. It is water-soluble and colorless at first. It has an optical brightening effect that has been used since the 1940s to give a whiter appearance to textiles. It is also added to laundry detergents commercially as a brightener.

== Fluorescence ==
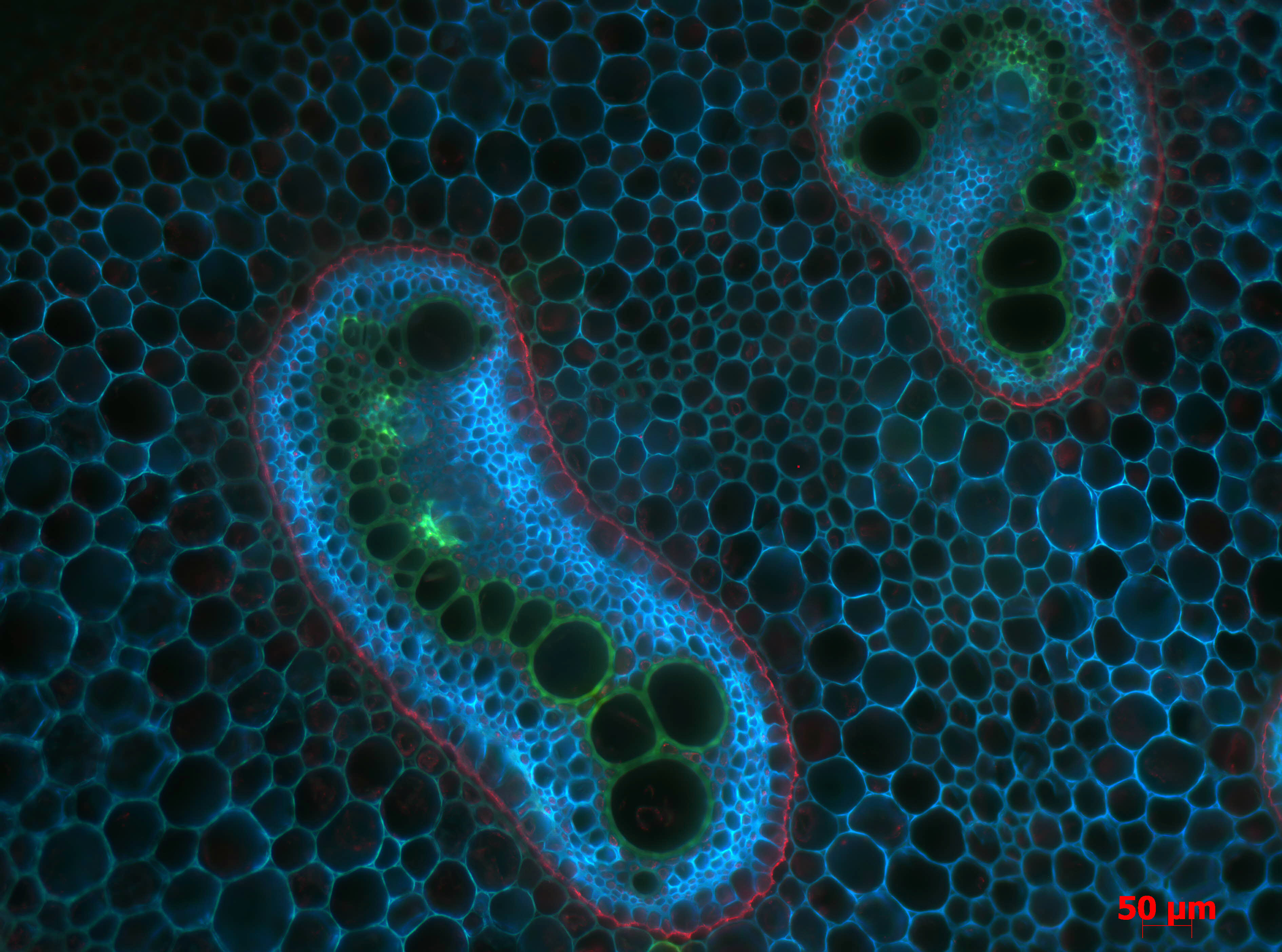
This cross section of a fern shows the bright green and bright blue fluorescence seen with CFW.

Solutions that are aqueous for calcofluor-white have an absorption spectrum from 300 to 412 nm with a peak at 347 nm. The peak of fluorescence occurs best with ultraviolet light, but violet/blue violet also gives great results of fluorescence. Calcofluor-White is an fluorescent dye, meaning it has an excitation and emission wavelength that differs from one another. The excitation wavelength is 380 nm while the emission is 475 nm. The fluorescence can best be seen with ultraviolet light, but it can also be seen with violet or blue violet.

Fungi tend to display a bright green color under UV/violet/violet-blue light due to the barrier filters used in microscopy for fluorescence. Calcofluor white has to careful interpretation of staining as some non-specific reactions can make the background look a fluorescent yellow-green color. This can be reduced by looking at the cells under blue light or with other filters to see the best picture possible. Evans blue is a counterstain for calcofluor white as it can help diminish the background tissues and cells with blue light.

=== Comparative studies ===
In a comparative study of potassium hydroxide (KOH), Calcofluor-White and Fungal cultures for diagnosing Fungal Onychomycosis, CFW was seen as the most sensitive method in detecting the infection in humans. The study saw that out of 150 patients CFW showed positive in 95 of them. The study also reviewed key advantages for using the Calcofluor-White stain over KOH. It discussed that CFW requires a quick screening time as it can be seen on low power objectives and can be done within a minute while KOH requires about 3–4 minutes for each slide. It is a quicker and more sensitive method of screening than KOH, and the background material can be diverted using CFC.

In a study of methods to diagnose mycoses, a fungal infection in humans, CFW was compared with KOH and Chicago Sky Blue 6B. CFW showed positive testing in 53.4% of cases that had suspected mycoses infections while Chicago Sky Blue 6B had 55% accuracy. The study showed that the CFW is less effective in quick detection compared to Chicago Sky Blue 6B, but it is an effective way to detect the fungal infection.

A study that investigated the detection of Candida in cancerous or precancerous lesions using CFW with fluorescent microscopy. The study wanted to see the effectiveness of Calcofluor-White against a species of mycotic infections that can cause death or serious injury against patients who are immunocompromised. It also investigated the sensitivity of the dye compared to Gram staining and PAS staining. The study concluded that it was a quick and easy way to diagnosis in cytopathology and histopathology, but it was relatively expensive. The study also showed that no special techniques were needed to make the staining effective. The dye also does not interfere with PAS or Gram staining. For cytology, Pap-CFW gave a positive response 50 out of 135 times, and for histopathology, it gave a positive response 43 out of 135 for just the CFW stain. The study showed that the staining improved with a pairing of Pap and CFW. The results gave that the dye was incredibly effective in terms of quick diagnosis and effectiveness, making it superior to Gram positive and PAS in this particular study. Overall, the stain has key advantages to research and diagnostic purposes, but it has an issue of being slightly expensive and can not be as accurate for certain species.

== Limitations ==
CFW shows poor staining and fluorescence of several fungal organisms including Coccidioides immitis, Histoplasma capsulatum, and Cryptococcus neoformans. CFW staining of Pneumocystis carinii in lung biopsies can be optimized by initial incubation in CFW at room temperature for five minutes followed by 65 °C incubation for five minutes. Fluorescence may be masked by darkly pigmented fungi.
