= Aril Edvardsen =

Norwegian preacher (1938–2008)

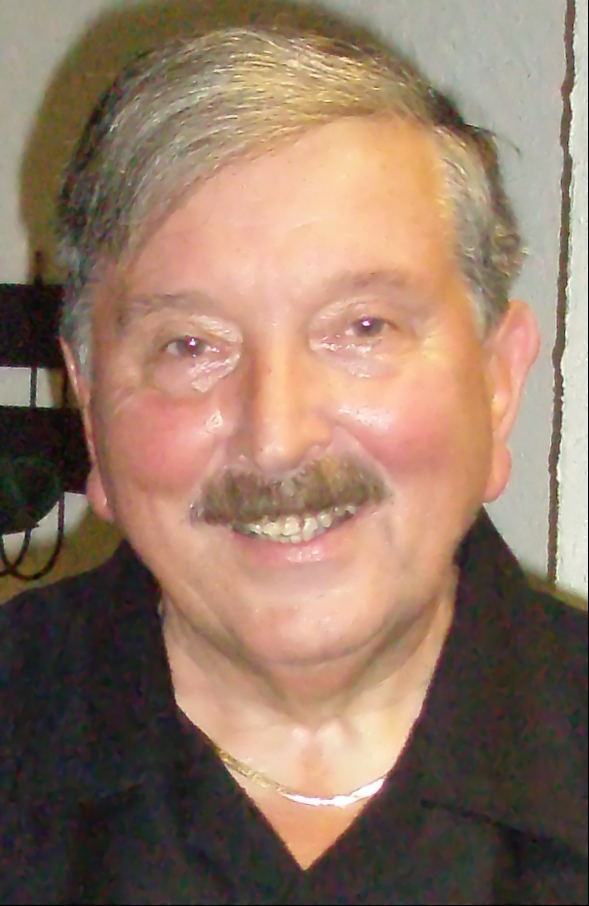
- Born: 15 November 1938; Kvinesdal, Norway
- Died: 6 September 2008 (aged 69); Mombasa, Kenya
- Occupations: Evangelist, missionary

Aril Snorre Edvardsen (15 November 1938 – 6 September 2008) was a Norwegian evangelical preacher and missionary.

In his youth Edvardsen was active in local politics for the Workers' Youth League, the youth wing of the Norwegian Labour Party, and also performed in a country music band. He claimed to have been born again in 1956, an experience which led him to redirect his life towards evangelical work. Then, in 1960, he experienced what he described as a calling, instructing him to start worldwide evangelising through the use of native missionaries.

In 1965 he founded the organisation Troens Bevis (Evidence of Faith), an organisation that would grow to support around 1000 native missionaries around the world. The organisation today includes a multi-media venture, with daily television broadcasts reaching as many as 200 different nations. In 2007 Aril Edvardsen's son Rune took over leadership of Troens Bevis.

Edvardsen married his classmate Kari when he was 17 years old. It was allegedly while his wife was in the hospital giving birth to the couple's first daughter that Edvardsen went along with a friend to the meeting where his conversion happened.

He died on 6 September 2008, in Mombasa, Kenya, where he was on vacation with his wife after a missionary campaign in Zanzibar, Tanzania. According to friends he had experienced cardiac problems for a time before his death. Edvardsen's funeral on 15 September 2008 was attended by some 1,500–2,000 people, including the Norwegian Minister of Fisheries and Coastal Affairs, Helga Pedersen.
