= Astrid Gunhilde Karlsen =

Norwegian politician

Astrid Gunhilde Karlsen (17 October 1920 – 5 May 2008) was a Norwegian politician for the Labour Party.

She served as a deputy representative to the Parliament of Norway from Aust-Agder during the terms 1954–1957, 1973–1977 and 1977–1981. In total she met during 4 days of parliamentary session.
