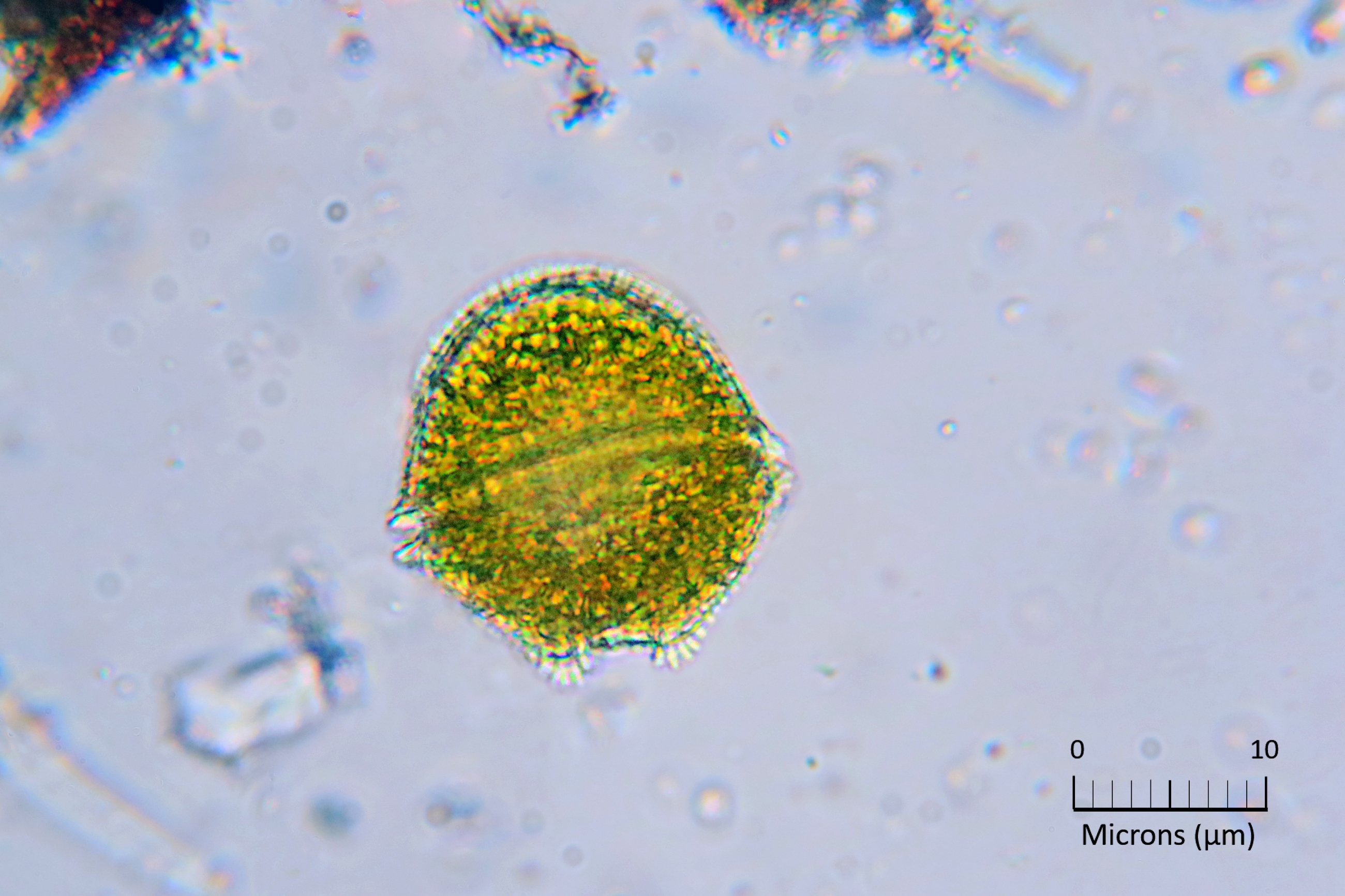
- Alexandrium minutum

Scientific classification
- Domain: Eukaryota
- Clade: Sar
- Clade: Alveolata
- Division: Dinoflagellata
- Class: Dinophyceae
- Order: Gonyaulacales
- Family: Ostreopsidaceae
- Genus: Alexandrium; Halim, 1960

Species
- Alexandrium acatenella; Alexandrium affine; Alexandrium andersonii; Alexandrium australiense; Alexandrium balechii; Alexandrium camurascutulum; Alexandrium catenella; Alexandrium cohorticula; Alexandrium compressum; Alexandrium concavum; Alexandrium depressum; Alexandrium diversaporum; Alexandrium foedum; Alexandrium fraterculus; Alexandrium gaarderae; Alexandrium globosum; Alexandrium hiranoi; Alexandrium insuetum; Alexandrium kutnerae; Alexandrium leei; Alexandrium margalefii; Alexandrium mediterraneum; Alexandrium minutum; Alexandrium monilatum; Alexandrium ostenfeldii; Alexandrium pacificum; Alexandrium pohangense; Alexandrium pseudogonyaulax; Alexandrium satoanum; Alexandrium tamarense; Alexandrium tamyavanichii; Alexandrium tamutum; Alexandrium taylorii; Alexandrium tropicale

= Alexandrium (dinoflagellate) =

Genus of single-celled organisms

Alexandrium is a genus of dinoflagellates. It contains some of the dinoflagellate species most harmful to humans, because it produces toxic harmful algal blooms (HAB) that cause paralytic shellfish poisoning (PSP) in humans. There are about 30 species of Alexandrium that form a clade, defined primarily on morphological characters in their thecal plates.

== Introduction ==
The group was not well-defined in the past and thus, due to interest of its toxic behaviour, people have revised the group through formal tabulation and usage of molecular markers such as the toxic gene, stx4A, to better understand not just the relationship between each species; but more importantly, to tell something about the spread and barriers to the bloom. Even if, much is known about the life cycles related to the blooms, much is still unknown as to how each life stage is triggered and transitions to the next stage. Predation and parasitism have proven to be great barriers for population growth. Learning about the pathways of toxin synthesis can allow us to determine how species of Alexandrium have adapted and co-evolved to persist.

== Etymology ==
In the 1960s, an Egyptian researcher by the name of Youssef Halim discovered a red tide along the coast of the Alexandria harbour in Egypt. It was the first described red tide in Egypt and later on, Halim identified and named the culprit as Alexandrium as homage to where it was found and he identified Alexandrium minutum as the genus's type species.

== History of knowledge ==
Species currently included in Alexandrium have been known for a long time, but initially they were classified in different genera, notably, Gonyaulax. Nonetheless, the first attempt at revising the genus, Gonyaulax, was made by Kofoid in 1911. Kofoid was a very influential biologist during his time. His greatest work was the development of the universal "Kofoid System" that classified dinoflagellates based on plate morphology very detailed drawings and well-defined structures. Unfortunately, however Kofoid divided Gonyaulax into four subgenera based on shape, and included several species that should not have been classified under the name Gonyaulax.

Lebour (1925) described a new species called Gonyaulax tamarensis. Whedon and Kofoid in 1936 used the same tabulation as Lebour and described two new species, Gonyaulax acatenella and Gonyaulax catenella. The latter was studied in much more detail due to the fact that it caused paralytic shellfish poisoning (PSP) in humans, who acquire it from bivalve mollusks. As more and more species were described, they either put them into the "tamarensis group" or the "catenella group". By no means was it simple to put species into either group and this caused great confusion. The "tamarensis group" was divided into two subgroups and were separated by whether or not one of its thecal plates had contact with the ventral pore or not. Goniodoma and Gonyaulax were very similar. In 1954, Gaarder stated that her Goniodoma species described had very similar characteristics to the "tamarensis group" in Gonyaulax. She is believed to be the first to clarify the differences in the two groups based on the plate tabulation.

In 1960, Halim created the new genus Alexandrium with Alexandrium minutum as the only species described in it and he put it into the "tamarensis group". The "tamarensis group" had become a taxonomical chaos by this time, in part because many scientists had differences in opinion about the species and genus taxonomy included in this group. Many species from the same location had been given several names. The group included for example the genus: Gonyaulax, Goniodoma, Pyrodinium, Alexandrium, Gessnerium, Protogonyaulax, and Glenodinium. In 1971, the group was revised by Steidinger, who suggested that the "tamarensis group" should be separated from Gonyaulax. She also recognized Alexandrium as being part of the group. Meanwhile, in the same year, Balech suggested that the Gonyaulax group should be separated into Alexandrium or Gessnerium.

What gave people interest in studying Alexandrium was because it produces paralytic shellfish toxins (PST). The theory of becoming toxic was that originally, bacteria in the ocean would compete with each other producing toxic by-products. Alexandrium being bacterivorous would ingest these bacteria and gain the ability to produce these PST's. Later studies have shown that indeed if you remove the symbiotic bacteria of specific Alexandrium species, the dinoflagellate produces less toxin. If you put new bacteria into the Alexandrium species, there is no change in toxin production. Nonetheless, this theory needs more evidence to be supported.

== Molecular phylogeny ==
Before molecular data, the main way to distinguish between Alexandrium species was to identify whether or not it made chains or if the 1' thecal plate touched the ventral pore or not. (5) However, this was not very effective in distinguishing between different species, especially, as more and more species were described. Hence, taxonomists have organized different species into different species complexes based on gene markers, of which the two most well-established and deadliest ones are the Alexandrium tamarense species complex and the Alexandrium minutum species complex.

Originally, the Alexandrium tamarense species complex included Alexandrium tamarense, Alexandrium fundyense, and Alexandrium catenella. The phylogeny was created using primarily Large Subunit and Small Subunit ribosomal RNA. By constructing using rDNA, researchers found that the phylogeny forms five different geographical clades in the Alexandrium tamarense species complex. These are the North American, Western European, Temperate Asian, Tasmanian, Tropical Asian clades, and a Mediterranean clade.

The new revised Alexandrium tamarense species complex is grouped into five clades that are named Groups I-V. There are currently 5 species included in this complex: Alexandrium fundyense (Group I); Alexandrium mediterraneum (Group II); Alexandrium tamarense (Group III); Alexandrium pacificum (Group IV); Alexandrium australiense (Group V).

There are three morphospecies that can be distinguished primarily based on morphology: A. catenella, A. fundyense, and A. tamarense. They have differences in their size (length to width ratio), the presence or absence of the ventral pore attached to the 1' or even the 4' thecal plate, and the differences in other thecal plates. A. catenella can form chains, while A. fundyense and A. tamarense cannot. A. catenalla has a lower length to width ratio than the other two. (5) A. tamarense has a ventral pore, but the other two do not. It has been found that many cells have intermediate morphologies between the morphologies described in A. tamarense and A.fundyense. As well, the ventral pore was sometimes present and sometimes absent in A. fundyense. Although A. catenella is found in the same location as A. fundyense, it is suggested to not include it in the Alexandrium tamarense species complex. Morphological characteristics have been less distinctive than scientist have originally thought.

However, using rDNA has provided more confidence on differentiating them phylogenetically. Using ITS/5.8S genetic distances within and between species, one can differentiate between differences in genomic mismatch between the two species. The genetic distance between the same species was much lower than between different species confirming the distinct species-specific clades. ITS2 compensatory base changes (CBC) are used as genetic markers that is used for studying the diversity of eukaryotic species. CBC in the secondary structure of helix III are present in groups I, II, and V, but absent in groups III and IV. Groups I and III cannot produce viable cysts. Scientists screened for presence or absence of the sxtA4 domain of the sxtA gene to determine the toxicity of each group. Groups I and IV produce saxitoxin, while groups II and III do not. Group V can sometimes produce or not produce saxitoxin. There are several other species that are not included in this group.

Alexandrium minutum species complex includes A. lusitanicum, A. angustitabulatum, A. minutum, A. andersonii, A. tamutum, and A. insuetum. The main difference between this group and the tamarense species complex, is that the A. minutum group species are much smaller and the development of toxicity is much variable, even between different strains. Again, previously this group was defined based on morphology. But the morphology of this group is much more variable, especially in the different strains. A. insuetum was the only species that did not have the 1' plate connected to the ventral pore. Both A. angustitabulatum and A. lusitanicum were very similar in morphology to A. minutum. A. andersonii was the most different from the group and was slightly larger than the average size of the group. A. tamutum is also similar to A. minutum but has a wider 6' plate. Upon new morphological analysis, it was shown that there was no difference between the width of the s.a. plate and the 1' plate which was thought to have been the same in the past.

When constructing the phylogeny, A. minutum is separated into two main clades. The larger clade included strains found in Europe and the South Pacific. The smaller clade included strains found in New Zealand and Taiwan. (6) A. angustitabulatum and A. lusitanicum did not differentiate into separate clades and were included in the A. minutum species complex. Thus researchers have suggested that these two names be no longer separate and be included under the species A. minutum. A. insuetum formed a separate clade and the three strains were separated further; the two Japanese strains were separated from the French strain. As well, A. tamatum also formed a well-supported clade with its 5 strains; the Taiwanese strain was separated but basal to the Italian strains. A. andersonii and A. ostenfeldii were found to be the outgroup and formed the root of the tree.

The A. catenella group includes A. catenella and A. compressum. Their morphological feature is that they form chains with anterior-posterior compressed cells and do not have a ventral pore. The fraterculus group includes A. affine, A. cohorticula, A. fraterculus, A. tamiyavanischii and A. tropicale. The defining feature is that they form chains and have a ventral pore. The kutnera group includes A. kutnera, and A. leei. The defining features is that it has a ventral pore. The ostenfeldii species complex includes A. ostenfeldii, and A. peruvianum, which are now considered synonyms. The defining feature is that they have a narrow 1' plate and a large ventral pore. Some strains of these species can also produce a different toxin called spirolides. The pseudogonyaulax group includes A. pseudogonyaulax, A. hiranoi, A. taylorii, A.satoanum, and A.monilatum. The common feature of this group is that they do not form chains and produce goniodomins. The rest of the species have not been for the most part well-documented taxonomically and thus, there is limited molecular analysis on their phylogeny. Hence, the phylogeny of the other species need to be revised.

One research group has suggested that Alexandrium should be split in different genera, while a collection of specialists responded by asserting that Alexandrium is in fact paraphyletic, but that the taxon should be retained until more evidence becomes available.

== Habitat and ecology ==
Alexandrium as a whole is wide spread across the globe and has been identified in different parts of the Northern and Southern Hemisphere. The genus can be found in oligotrophic, mesotrophic, and eutrophic coastlines. During the winter months of temperate regions, the cysts remain dormant because of the cold temperatures. They also have an internal biological clock that tells them when to germinate and thus, is the reason most of the blooms are season driven. Cysts of A. tamarense can tolerate temperatures of −0.6 to 26.8 °C and this enables them to be well-distributed in marine seabeds. They cannot tolerate being anoxic. There may be large numbers of cyst populations, but only 20% of them can germinate and develop into a bloom, because oxygen is present mostly a few millimeters inside the sediment. Cysts have been observed to have prominent roles in genetic diversity of subpopulations and in gene flow between subpopulations. With a few exceptions, the toxic and non-toxic forms do not overlap in range because these two forms are distinct biological species that have limited sexual compatibility to other species. Scientists have observed hybrids of toxic and non-toxic forms produce lethal cells.

Alexandrium is an opportunistic dinoflagellate and thus it can bloom in nutrient-rich and nutrient-poor areas. For most species, in order for the bloom to be positively regulated it must be in a water body with high surface water temperatures, maximum water column stability, low nutrients, and low winds.

In salt ponds, Alexandrium population growth rates depend on salinity and temperature. However, in areas like the Bay of Fundy, bloom dynamics depend more readily on the mixing of tidal waters in the open region. In salt ponds, A. fundyense migrate vertically down at night, but migrate closer to the surface of the pond during the day. However, they do not migrate too close to the surface to be flushed out with the outflowing surface water. (3) The hydro-geographical barrier and the organism's behavior restrict blooms to occur in neighbouring waters, and thus, result in high concentration of toxicity accumulating in shellfish.

Other oceanographic forces include the mechanisms of upwelling winds and downwelling winds that can also play a role in bloom concentration. (10) Upwelling winds result in pushing the cells off the coast. (10) This can decline the bloom populations. However, when wind is pushing the bloom offshore, the vegetative cells can encyst and sink to the bottom of the sediment. (10) Once wind levels decrease, they transform into vegetative cells again. (3)(10) On the other hand, downwelling winds can allow the cells to be brought back to the coast and resurfaced. (10) This can have the opposite effect of localizing blooms and thereby increasing toxic concentration. (10)

The time length of the blooms occur around 2–3 months. Generally, warm temperatures and sufficient nutrient concentrations can provide for excellent growth. However, even with optimal temperatures, Alexandrium populations can be declining and this has more to do with the life cycle than what was thought to do with things like predation and parasitism. Sexuality happens well before the bloom population peaks, and a large fraction of the bloom population is mating to produce cysts that fall to the sediment. Hence, experiments have shown that temperature and nutrient availability can regulate sexuality and encystment. It has been shown that A.catenella relies on organic nutrients produced by diatom blooms and or from picocyanobacterial. Such observations may be a reason why blooms from other protists like diatoms correlate with blooms of Alexandrium.

Alexandrium has been increasingly more common in large city harbours, for example along the coast of the Mediterranean Sea. High Alexandrium growth has also been typically found in low-salinity freshwater plumes. Freshwater runoffs have high organic matter, and other micronutrients, such as high iron content. Even though humans have definitely increased the amount of biomatter in the ocean, we cannot directly correlate an increase in range of Alexandrium blooms because of human activity. This is because most blooms occur in remote and pristine waters in places like Alaska and Southern Argentina.

As autotrophs, Alexandrium species produce oxygen by consuming inorganic carbon. Organic carbon is not excreted as much compared to other phytoplankton. Inorganic carbon fixation increased or decreased either with an increase or decrease in nitrogen uptake, depending on the nutrition of the cell. Alexandrium accumulates ammonium internally.

Many species are also mixotrophs and have been observed to contain bacteria and flagellates inside food vacuoles. A. minutum can ingest cyanobacteria. A. catenella can ingest heterotrophic bacteria and cyanobacteria. A. tamarense ingests haptophytes, cryptophytes, small diatoms, and Heterosigma akashiwo. A. tamarense has also been observed eating other dinoflagellates such as Amphidinium carterae and Prorocentrum minimum. Blooms can be terminated because of cell lysis, infection from viruses and/or bacteria, parasites, and encystment. Both heterotrophic and mixotrophic dinoflagellates feed on Alexandrium. as does the ciliate Favella. Amoebophrya (a parasitic dinoflagellate) and Parvilucifera (a perkinsozoan flagellate), are known to infect Alexandrium species. Specifically, Parvilucifer infects the mobile zygote and pellicle cyst of A. minutum.

== Morphology and anatomy ==
Alexandrium has a typical dinoflagellate morphology, with the episome, cingulum, hyposome, and sulcus. It has two flagella: a transverse flagellum around the cingulum groove called the girdle, and the longitudinal flagellum that extends outwards from the sulcal groove. It has an ornamented theca. The morphology of Alexandrium is variable but, the genus Alexandrium can be separated from Gessnerium by having the 1' plate directly or indirectly connected to the extreme, anterior plate, Po. Generally, the Po is large and oval. The Po has a cavity called the aperture which is mostly comma-shaped. There are many small pores on the outside of the comma and the apical plates. Species that produce chains have secondary pores that are located most of the time dorsally on the comma. These pores are not found in the cingular and sulcal plates.

== Life cycle ==
Alexandrium has a zygotic lifecycle. In the vegetative phase, the species are haploid and under certain circumstances related to stress, the vegetative cells can transform into non-motile pellicle cysts with a thin cell wall. (3) The vegetative phase and pellicle cyst stage are very flexible and Alexandrium species can often switch back to vegetative cells when the stress has been removed or decreased. (3) In the vegetative phase, cells divide through desmoschisis: each daughter cell retains half the thecal plates of the mother. Some species such as A. taylorii and A. hiranoi can produce non-motile dividing cysts that have the ability to divide, where the formation of these cysts are restricted to the dark phase and germination in the light phase.

The triggering of pellicle cyst formation is often due to turbulence, presence of parasites, and or passage through the gut of grazers. Thus, one of the defense mechanisms that Alexandrium deploys against parasites, is by becoming pellicle cysts which makes them more resistant to parasitic infection. Some species have evolved forming chains to give them an advantage. It is suggested that forming chains is in response to high turbulence, to swimming faster than single cells allowing them to migrate farther or deeper, and a defense mechanism for reducing grazing.

During the sexual phase, the vegetative cells can form gametes that conjugate, resulting in what is called a diploid planozygote that can transform into a resting cyst called a hypnozygote. In some species, the planozygote can go through meiosis and produce a vegetative cell. The gametes can recognize each-other by the help of agglutinin-like compounds and the gametes can then fuse on their ventral side, producing a biflagellated diploid planozygote. The gametes of Alexandrium are the same as vegetative cells or they can be smaller in size.

The time the hypnozygote spends in the sediment is most likely related to the specific species and or environmental factors. Temperature changes have also been shown to produce varying amounts of cysts. In the case of A. tamarense, specific bacteria may inhibit or trigger cyst production. In colder temperatures, the maturation length may be prolonged. The bloom of some species is seasonally driven, or the bloom can be regulated by environmental forces (e.g. temperature), in addition to being seasonally driven. Under the right conditions, the hypnozygote germinates and releases a motile cell called a planomeiocyte. The sexual cycle is complete once the planomeiocyte divides and produces vegetative cells again.

== Genetics ==
The cell cycle is composed of the typical eukaryotic stages in M1, S Phase, G1 and G2. It goes through a light/dark dependent manner. During the night, the cells are haploid and have only one copy of the DNA. During the day, the population is in S phase with two copies of DNA. They go through closed mitosis. G2 to M phase is regulated by nutrient factors, while the S phase is controlled through light/dark timing. Alexandrium species must be of proper size before then can enter S and G2 phase. Alexandrium fundyense increases greatly in size during the G2/M phase and after mitosis, it decreases in size. Other species can produce DNA through the entirety of the cell cycle. Thus, researchers have said that going through G1 is light dependent and going through S phase is size dependent.

The specific toxins produced are regulated by the nuclear genes. The genome mass is upwards of 200 pg DNA. It has up to 150 chromosomes that have permanently condensed chromatin. Both the plastid genome and the mitochondrial genome are typical of normal dinoflagellates. For example, in the case of plastid genomes, the number of plastid genes have reduced because they have become nuclear encoded instead. In A. tamarense, researchers have identified 48 non-minicircle encoded photosystem genes which are found in the nuclear genome. 15 genes that are supposed to be found in the plastid genome have become nuclear encoded instead in A. tamarense. Hence, the plastid genome has been reduced to 15 single-gene minicircles. The mitochondrial genome is also greatly reduced to only having cob, cox1, and cox3 protein coding genes. They also have lost the complex 1 oxidative phosphorylation genes and A. tamarense has replaced it with NADH dehydrogenase 2 (NDH-2). In the case of A. catenella, translation of the mitochondrial genome, does not require initiation and termination codons.

== Fossil record ==
Although Alexandrium does not fossilize very well. The resting cysts can fossilize somewhat. Some researchers have hypothetically calculated that the average age of Alexandrium is 77 million years old which is going back to the Cretaceous period. What allowed Alexandrium to increase greatly was the mass extinction in the Cretaceous period (65 MYA) and the great increase in temperature of the sea in the Paleocene Era (55 MYA). These two events reduced Alexandrium competitors and also made it more favorable for it to increase in size. The rise of the isthmus of Panama that happened between 3–13 MYA subdivided and separated many species into distinct geographical populations. This had profound effect on the Alexandrium tamarense species complex. In the present day, their population is much smaller than what was before.

== Practical importance ==
Alexandrium produces a variety of toxic derivatives. The first group of toxins it produces includes carbomoyltoxins: saxitoxin (STX), neosaxitoxin (NEO), and C-11 O-sulfated analogues gonyautoxins (GTX1-GTX4). The other group of toxins made is the N-21 sulfocarbamoyl analogues (B1=GTX5, B2= GTX6, C1-C4). Toxin production seems to be genetically specific in the different Alexandrium species, but the cell toxin content is much more variable and thus, not a very good molecular marker for phylogeny. However, it seems that with distinct geographical locations, there may be differences in the PSP toxin composition of Alexandrium species or even strains. There may be selective forces that favour certain cysts with particular toxin composition.

PSP toxin is produced in the G1 phase of the cell cycle and spirolides are produced in the G2 phase of the cell cycle. Specific polyketide (PKS) genes are involved in spirolide biosynthesis. Spirolide is composed of acetate with an imine moiety. The saxitoxin pathway is generally the same in dinoflagellates and cyanobacteria, but the transcripts of the dinoflagellates occur in multiple copies, meaning it is monocistronic, and have splice leader sequences. Lytic allelochemicals target external cell membranes of other protists. In particular, lytic compounds in A. tamarense can increase the permeability of Ca2+ ions in other protist cell membranes. Waterborne cues from copepods can upregulate PSP toxin content in Alexandrium and differentially regulate genes by regulating the serine/threonine kinase signalling transduction pathway.

Alexandrium blooms cause PSP poisoning in bivalve molluscs, but they can also cause damage to fish farms resulting large losses local or large businesses. Many salmon are affected every year in Canada because of Alexandrium blooms. A. catenella can cause low gill viability. A. catenella causes tissue damage in gills, by primarily producing reactive oxygen species or ROS.
