= Jan Petter Sissener =

Norwegian businessperson (born c. 1955)

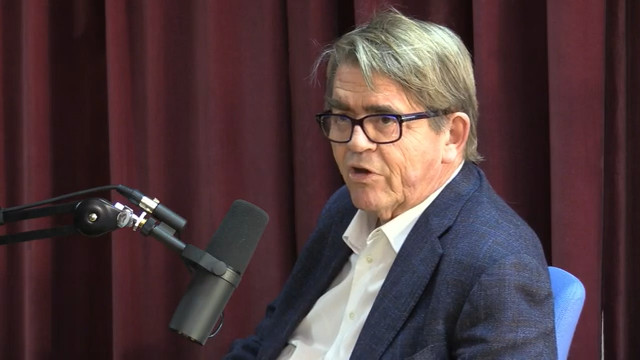
Image of Jan Petter Sissener

Jan Petter Wilhelm Courvoisier Sissener (born 14 March 1955) is a Norwegian businessperson.

Jan Petter Sissener was born in Geneva in 1955. Following his parents' divorce, he moved to Norway and adopted his mother's last name, Sissener. After attempting law school in Geneva, he studied at the Norwegian School of Management. Following his graduation there he started working for E. Vestnes as a money broker. In 1983, he became a partner in Gunnar, Bohn & Co, later known as Alfred Berg Norge.

In 1986, Sissener began working at Carnegie International in London, and in 1989, he returned to Norway where he established Carnegie's Norwegian branch. After transforming Carnegie into one of Norway's premier brokerages, he branched out on his own in 1993 and founded his brokerage firm, Sirius Securities. Sirius achieved rapid success and was acquired by Orkla Finans after only five months. Sissener then led Orkla Finans for the next seven years.

In 2001, he was once again hired by Alfred Berg, this time as their Head of Nordic Equities. Alfred Berg experienced considerable success under Sissener's leadership. However, Sissener eventually disagreed with the owner, ABN Amro, and departed Alfred Berg in 2005. He then joined Kaupthing as the CEO of their Norwegian activities while also serving as their Global Head of Equities. He left Kaupthing in February 2008 following a disagreement with the board. Kaupthing was, according to Starmine, amongst the best Nordic brokerages in 2008.

In 2009, Sissener purchased Saga Capital, a company with license to conduct discretionary Asset Management. Saga Capital was later changed to Sissener AS. In 2009, Sissener AS was established as an alternative to other investment firms. The company has two active funds, Sissener Energy (2010) and Sissener Sirius (2009). A third fund, Sissener Ucits, is being launched in 2012.
