= Gerd Olaug Berger =

Norwegian politician

Gerd Olaug Berger (29 December 1915 – 22 February 2008) was a Norwegian politician for the Centre Party.

She served as a deputy representative to the Parliament of Norway from Akershus during the term 1965–1969. In total she met during 53 days of parliamentary session.
