= Thorvald Gressum =

Norwegian politician (1932–2008)

Thorvald Gressum (29 March 1932 – 13 February 2008) was a Norwegian politician for the Labour Party.

Gressum served as deputy mayor of Sarpsborg from 1976 to 1983 and mayor from 1984 to 1995. He was the leader of Sarpsborg Labour Party from 1974 to 1976, and board member (sometimes deputy) of Østfold Labour Party from 1977 to 1984. He served as a deputy representative to the Parliament of Norway from Østfold during the term 1977–1981.
