= Dinotoxin =

Dinotoxins are a group of toxins which are produced by flagellate, aquatic, unicellular protists called dinoflagellates. Dinotoxin was coined by Hardy and Wallace in 2012 as a general term for the variety of toxins produced by dinoflagellates. Dinoflagellates are an enormous group of marine life, with much diversity. With great diversity comes many different toxins, however, there are a few toxins (or derivatives) that multiple species have in common.

Dinoflagellates normally have a low toxin production rate, therefore in small concentrations their toxins are not potent. However their toxins are highly poisonous in large concentrations. They are capable of poisoning various species of marine life such as many fish and shellfish, and affecting the nervous system of any wildlife or humans that consume the infected marine life, or drink the contaminated water. Under bloom conditions, commonly referred to as red tides or harmful algal blooms, dinoflagellates are capable of producing immense dinotoxin concentrations causing large fish die-offs, and contamination of shellfish. This contamination of shellfish leads to multiple severe human related illnesses. These illnesses include paralytic shellfish poisoning, diarrhetic shellfish poisoning, neurotoxic shellfish poisoning, and ciguatera fish poisoning.

Dinotoxins are impacting not only the marine ecosystem, but the economy as well. The economic impact is increasing compared to past years, due to the increase in seafood consumption, and coastal tourism.

== Common toxins ==
Below are three of the most common dinotoxins, these toxins are produced by a large variety of dinoflagellates. There is thought to be more than a few hundred different toxins produced by dinoflagellates.

Saxitoxins and Gonyautoxins are deadly neurotoxins which cause paralytic shellfish poisoning. Saxitoxin B1 has a lethal concentration of 86 to 788 micrograms per kilogram of body weight, while Gonyautoxins C1 and C2 are lethal in concentrations of 411 micrograms per kilogram of body weight.

Yessotoxins (YTXs) are potent cytotoxins which are made of disulfated polyether compounds. This toxins compromises the tumor suppressive functions of the E-cadherin–catenin system in epithelial cells.

== Function ==
Dinotoxins are produced for one of two intentional reasons; either to aid in predation or to act as a defense against predation. Toxins may also be produced as an unintentional byproduct due to metabolic processes that takes place within the organism.

== Genetics ==
The molecular genetics of dinotoxin synthesis is not widely understood, but the polyketide pathway involving polyketide synthase (PKS) is known to be associated with the production of dinotoxins. The toxins released by dinoflagellates commonly include sulfated polysaccharides. One common toxin, saxitoxin, blocks sodium ions from moving through sodium channels on cell membranes.

== Applications ==
Dinotoxins are high-value toxins in multiple fields of work such as chemical research, toxicological, and biomedical.

An economic increase in the seafood industry has made these toxins of higher interest to scientists. Studying dinotoxins allows scientists to create toxin assays can be used to analyze fish and seafood for safe levels of toxicity before consumption.

Antibodies can also be developed against dinotoxins, which can be effective in potentially harmful outbreak or field situations.

Some dinotoxins are useful in pain management. These toxins may have potential therapeutic effects along with other medical applications, including antiviral, antibacterial, and antioxidant activity. Free-radical scavenging, inflammation control, and tumor destruction are also applications of dinotoxins. They can act as anticoagulants, biolubricants, and can prevent pathogenic microorganisms from binding to cell membranes with an anti-adhesive property.

== See also ==
- Cyanotoxin
