= Ragnhild Langmyr =

Norwegian painter (1907 – 2008)

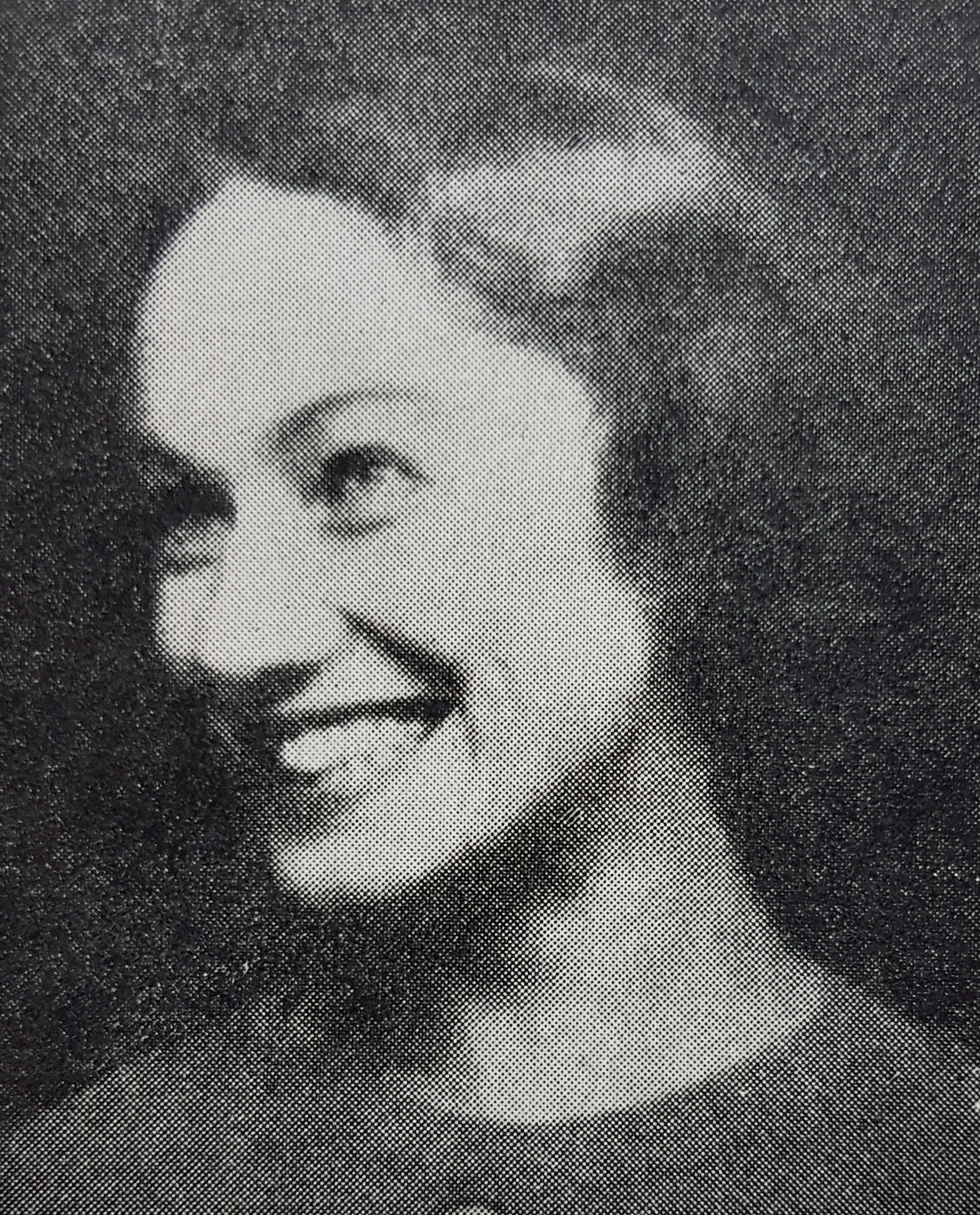
- Born: 10 November 1907; Horten, Norway
- Died: January 13, 2008 (aged 100); Oslo, Norway
- Occupation: painter

Ragnhild Langmyr (10 November 1907 – 13 January 2008) was a Norwegian painter.

== Personal life ==
She was born in Horten as a daughter of Fredrik Langmyr and Josefine Marie née Eriksen. She married painter Gert Jynge.

== Artistic career ==
She studied at the Norwegian National Academy of Craft and Art Industry under Eivind Nielsen and Olaf Willums, then from 1926 to 1928 and 1930–31 at the Norwegian National Academy of Fine Arts under Halfdan Strøm and Axel Revold. She also spent time in Paris and was visibly influenced by Cézanne.

She painted in a pale colour palette, mirroring aquarels and gouache. She chiefly painted human figures and abstract geometric shapes.

She was represented at the Autumn Exhibition in 1929, 1932 and 1933. She was then represented every year from 1935 to 1940, every year from 1955 to 1960, in 1963, 1964 and every year from 1966 to 1970; and lastly in 1974 and 1981. Other exhibitions included the National Gallery of Norway in 1940, Stockholm in 1951, Gothenburg in 1957, Copenhagen in 1969 and Kunstnernes Hus in 1973. Institutions that bought her works include National Gallery of Norway, the Statens Museum for Kunst, the Nordenfjeldske Kunstindustrimuseum, Oslo Municipality, the National Touring Exhibition and the Arts Council Norway.

She died at the age of 100 in January 2008 in Oslo.
