= Gudmund Sandvik =

Norwegian historian

Gudmund Sandvik (9 March 1925 – 2 February 2008) was a Norwegian historian.

He was born in Høyland as a son of a headmaster. He finished his secondary education in 1944 and among others worked as a teacher at the Lycée Corneille in Rouen before graduating from the University of Oslo with the cand.philol. degree in 1954.

After another period in France, as a lecturer in Norwegian at the University of Paris, from 1956, he was hired as a teacher at Gudbrandsdal Landsgymnas in 1958. He remained there until 1965, except for two years as a NAVF research fellow. In 1966 he finished the dr.philos. degree with the thesis Prestegard og prestelønn. Studiar kring problemet eigedomsretten til dei norske prestegardane.

Sandvik was a lecturer of history at the University of Oslo from 1965 and professor of the history of law from 1975. He was inducted into the Norwegian Academy of Science and Letters in 1977.

He resided in Bærum. He died at Rikshospitalet in February 2008, aged 82.
