= Bodil Finsveen =

Norwegian teacher, civil servant and politician

- Born: 23 September 1934; Fåberg Municipality, Norway
- Died: 14 October 2008 (aged 74)
- Occupations: Teacher; Civil servant Politician

Bodil Finsveen (23 September 1934 – 14 October 2008) was a Norwegian teacher, civil servant, and politician.

Born in Fåberg Municipality, she was the daughters of farmers Johannes Finsveen and Ingerid Opjordsmoen. Finsveen was elected as a representative to the Storting for the Centre Party from 1973–1977.
