= Odin Sivertsen =

Norwegian politician

Odin Sivertsen (1 August 1914 – 24 March 2008) was a Norwegian politician for the Anders Lange Party.

He served as a deputy representative to the Parliament of Norway from Rogaland during the term 1973–1977. In total he met during 20 days of parliamentary session.
