= Odd Henrik Sælen =

Norwegian oceanographer

Odd Henrik Sælen (8 June 1920 – 23 January 2008) was a Norwegian oceanographer.

He was born in Bergen. He took the dr.philos. degree in 1963, became a professor of physical oceanography at the University of Oslo in 1965 and a fellow of the Norwegian Academy of Science and Letters in 1971. From 1978 to his retirement he served at the University of Bergen.
