= Apothekernes Laboratorium =

Former Norwegian pharmaceutical company

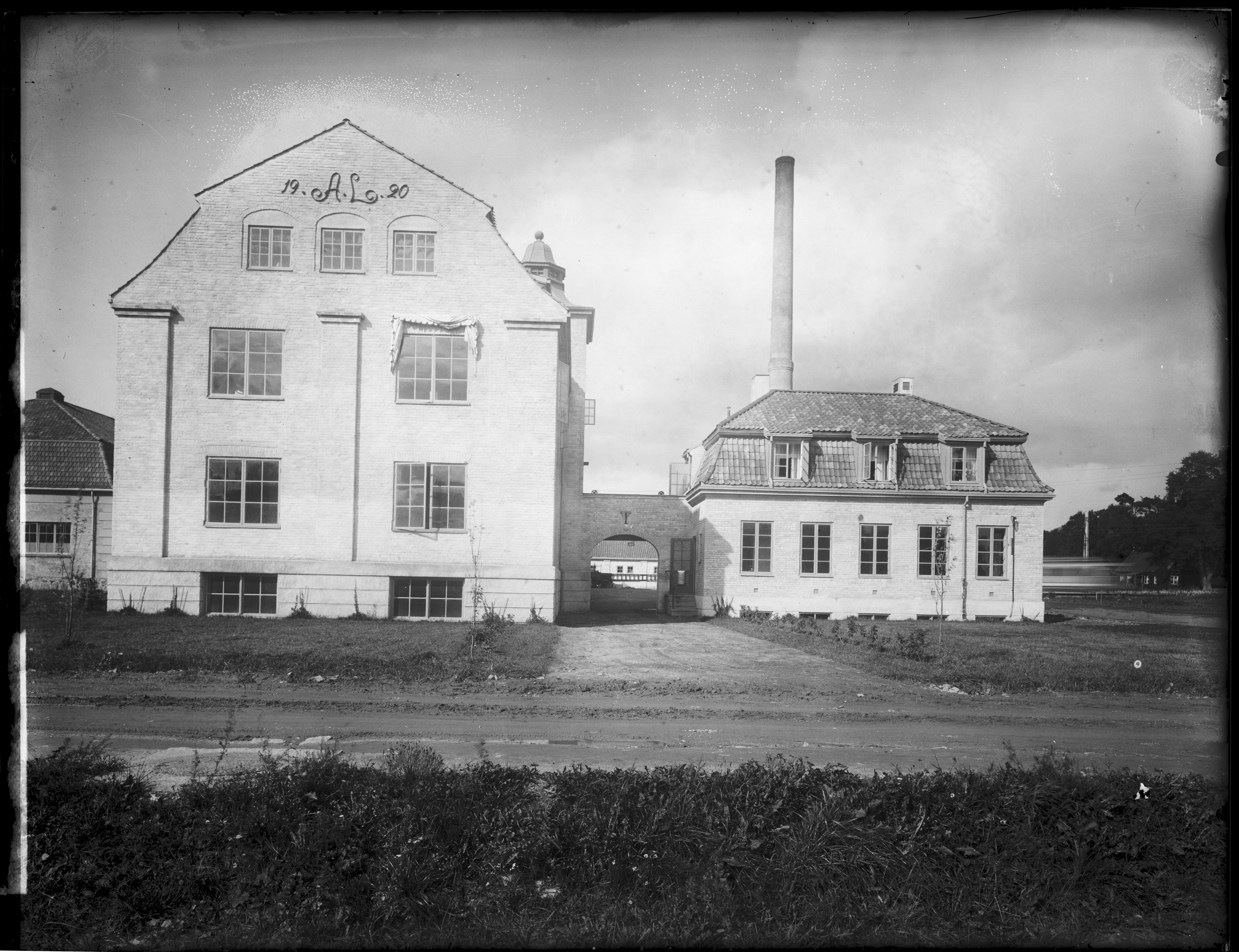
- Formerly: AS Apothekernes Laboratorium for Specialpræparater
- Company type: Aksjeselskap
- Industry: Pharmaceuticals
- Founded: 1903
- Defunct: 2006
- Fate: Merged into Alpharma; sold and split
- Headquarters: Skøyen, Oslo, Norway
- Products: Antibiotics, vitamins, pharmaceuticals

Apothekernes Laboratorium (Norwegian for "The Pharmacists' Laboratory"; often abbreviated A.L.) was a Norwegian pharmaceutical company in Oslo, founded in 1903 as a joint-stock company owned by Norwegian pharmacists. Long based at Skøyen in Oslo, it became known for producing antibiotics, vitamins, and medicines for both humans and animals, with the antibiotic bacitracin as its most important product. From 1975 it expanded in the United States through the subsidiary A.L. Laboratories Inc., which was listed on the United States stock market in 1984.

In 1994 the company and its American subsidiary were merged into Alpharma. The Sissener family ended its ownership when the group was sold in 2006, and the Norwegian production at Skøyen was continued as Xellia Pharmaceuticals.
