= Per Fuglum =

Norwegian historian and professor

Per Fuglum (7 January 1924 – 13 June 2008) was a Norwegian historian and professor.

He was born in Oslo. In 1957 he received his doctorate. Fuglum was assistant professor of history at the University of Oslo from 1961 to 1973, and professor of history at the University of Trondheimfrom 1973 to 1993. Fuglum was co-editor of Historisk tidsskrift from 1965 to 1971. Among his works are biographies of the Norwegian prime ministers Ole Richter (from 1964) and Gunnar Knudsen (from 1989). He has also written books on the history of temperance in Norway.

Per Fuglum private archive is kept at NTNU University Library.

== Selected works ==
- Norges historie. Bd 12, Norge i støpeskjeen: 1884-1920 (1988)
- Det norske totalavholdsselskap (1984)
- Kampen om alkoholen i Norge 1816-1904 (1972)
- Ole Richter. Statsministeren (1964)
