= Saera Khan =

Bangladeshi-Norwegian politician

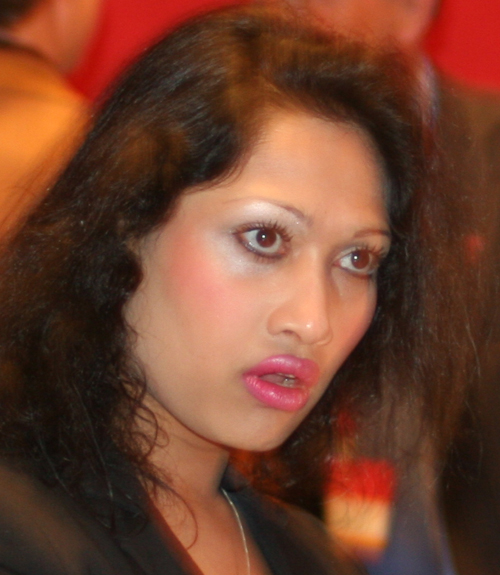
Saera Khan in Oslo, 2007.

Saera Tithi Khan (born 23 April 1979 in Oslo) is a Bangladeshi-Norwegian politician for the Labour Party.

She was elected to the Parliament of Norway from Oslo in 2005. She served as a deputy representative from 2001 to 2005. She was the only member of parliament with immigrant background before Akhtar Chaudhry won a seat, representing Oslo, in the October 2007 elections. She did not seek reelection in 2009.

On the local level she was a member of Oslo city council from 1999 to 2005.

She did not seek reelection in 2009 after she was cited for calling fortune tellers from her office phone.

== Personal ==
Khan was born to an educated family. Her father Kamaluddin Khan went to England to study law before he settled in Norway in 1968. The eldest child of the family, Saera has two younger brothers. Saera is doing her MA in Social Economics and Politics. Her mother teaches at a school for disabled children in Norway.

== 2008 psychic phone call controversy ==
Controversy erupted in late September 2008 when it was revealed that Khan had racked up extremely high phone bills using the mobile phone with which she was provided for free by the Parliament. The president of the Parliament, Thorbjørn Jagland, refused to pay these phone bills because of the amounts involved. First, Khan claimed that the reason for the high bills was that she had called her family abroad. When this was shown to be false, she instead claimed that she had a boyfriend who was a special operations soldier, and that the phone bills originated from satellite telephone calls to this boyfriend, triggering an investigation by the Norwegian Army because Norwegian soldiers are not allowed to receive private satellite calls while on duty. The result of this investigation was that the Army denied that Khan's boyfriend was a Norwegian soldier, upon which Khan told media that the alleged boyfriend was attached to the British ISAF force, and that his identity could not be disclosed for security reasons. The British Ministry of Defence subsequently denied that soldiers in the ISAF force were allowed to receive satellite phone calls. Following these revelations, Khan admitted that the phone bills were not due to overseas satellite calls, but rather from calls to Norwegian premium-rate numbers offering psychic advice services. The morning after these revelations, 8 October, Khan went on sick leave and announced later in the day that she is resigning as candidate for the 2009 parliamentary elections. Khan has repaid the part of her phone bills that exceeds reasonable use for a member of Parliament.

The BBC reported on 10 October 2008 that she had made 793 calls and that "her calls became so frequent that many fortune-tellers told her to stop ringing".
