= 2009 in Norway =

- Centuries: 19th; 20th; 21st
- Decades: 1980s; 1990s; 2000s; 2010s; 2020s
- See also: List of years in Norway

Events in the year 2009 in Norway.

== Incumbents ==
- Monarch – Harald V.
- Prime Minister – Jens Stoltenberg (Norwegian Labour Party)

== Events ==
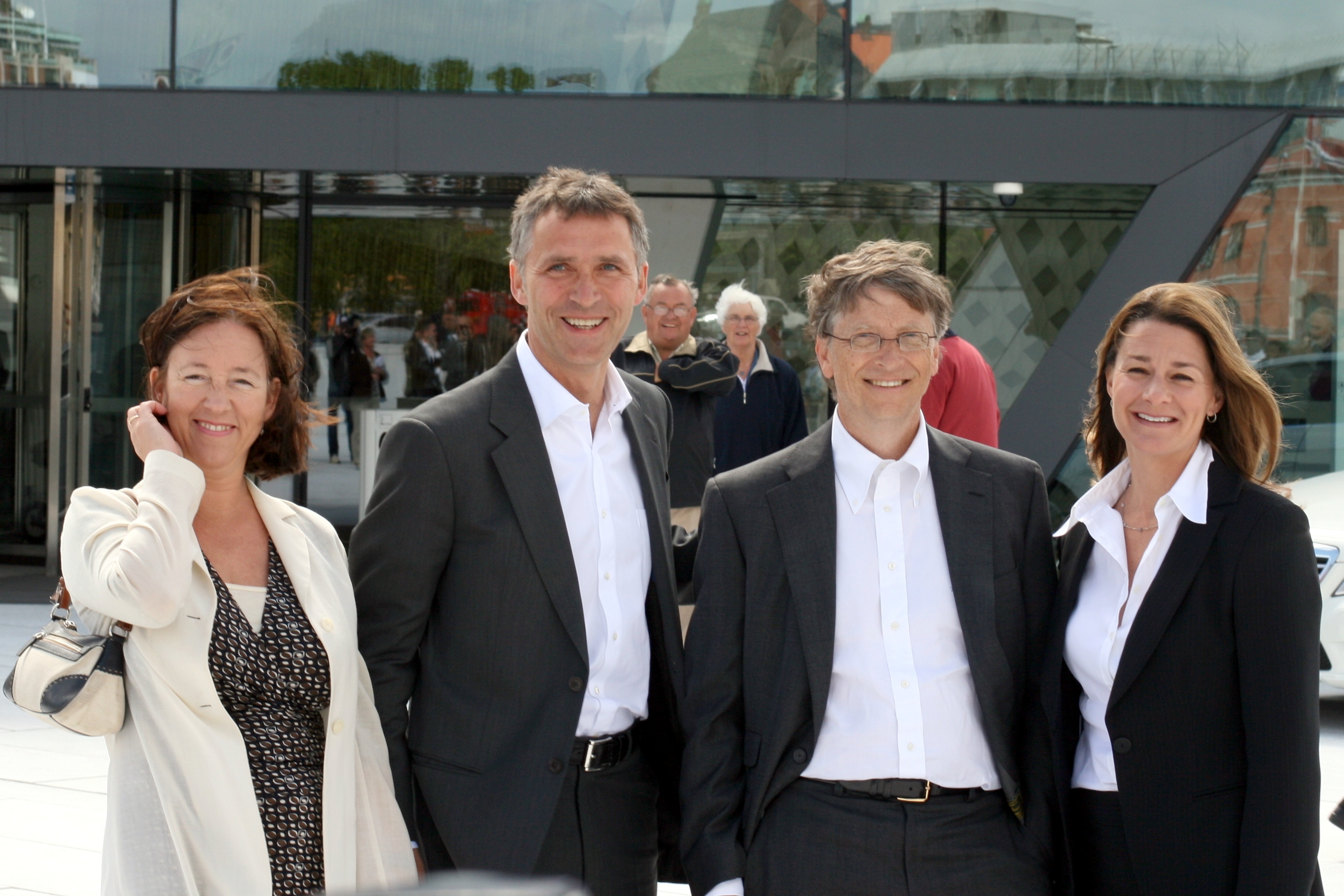
Norwegian Prime Minister Jens Stoltenberg (second left) and his wife Ingrid Schulerud (left), meet with Bill Gates (second right) and his wife Melinda Gates (right) at the visit to the Oslo Opera House, on 3 June 2009.

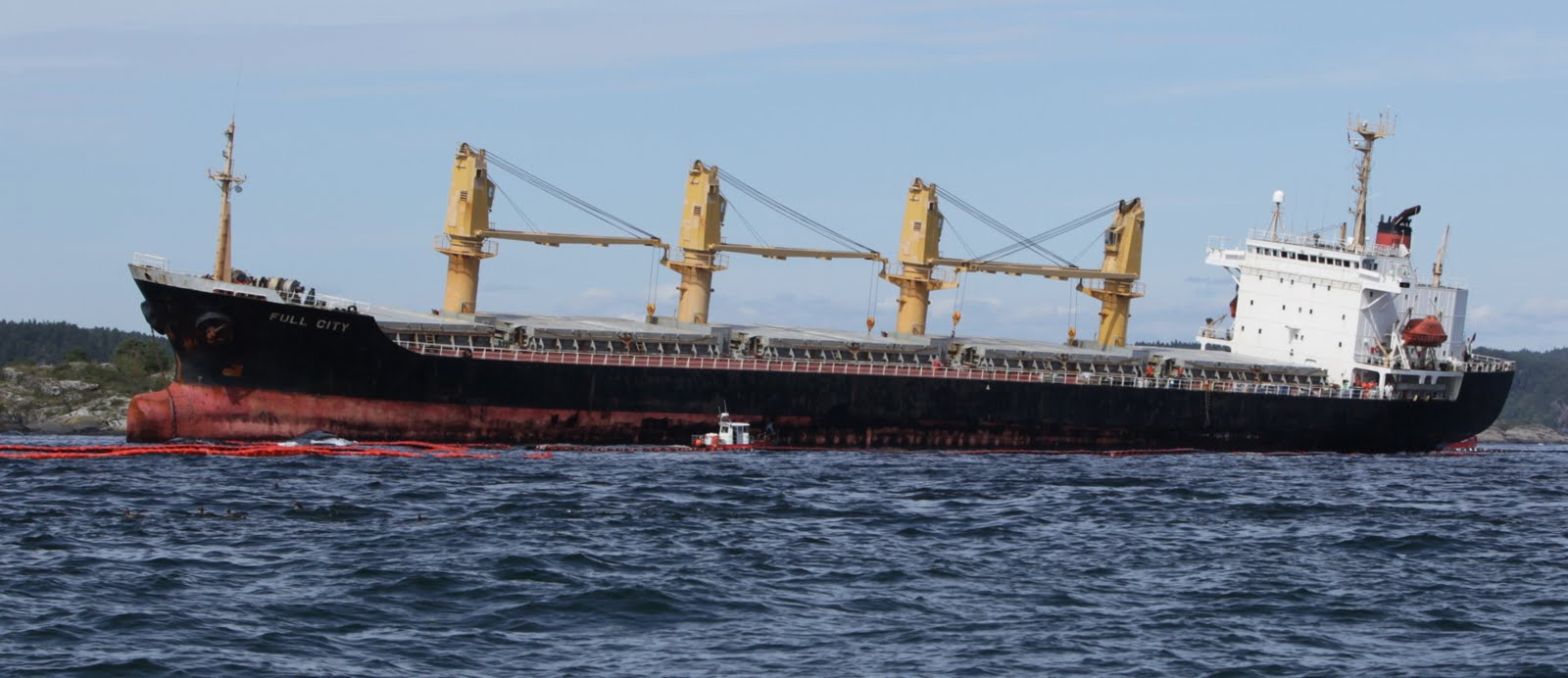
Full City oil spill in August 2009.

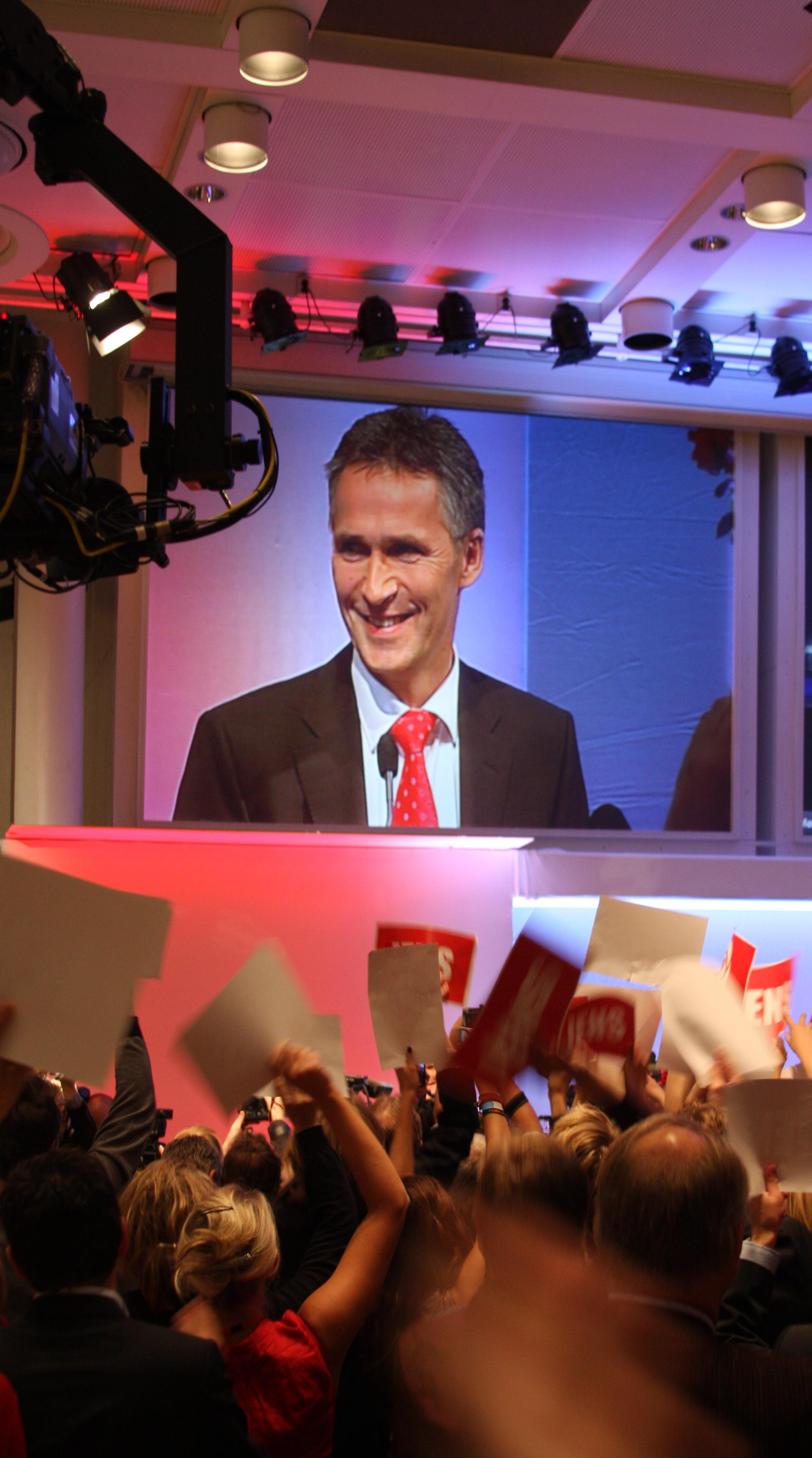
Jens Stoltenberg continue as Prime Minister of Norway following the 2009 Parliamentary election.

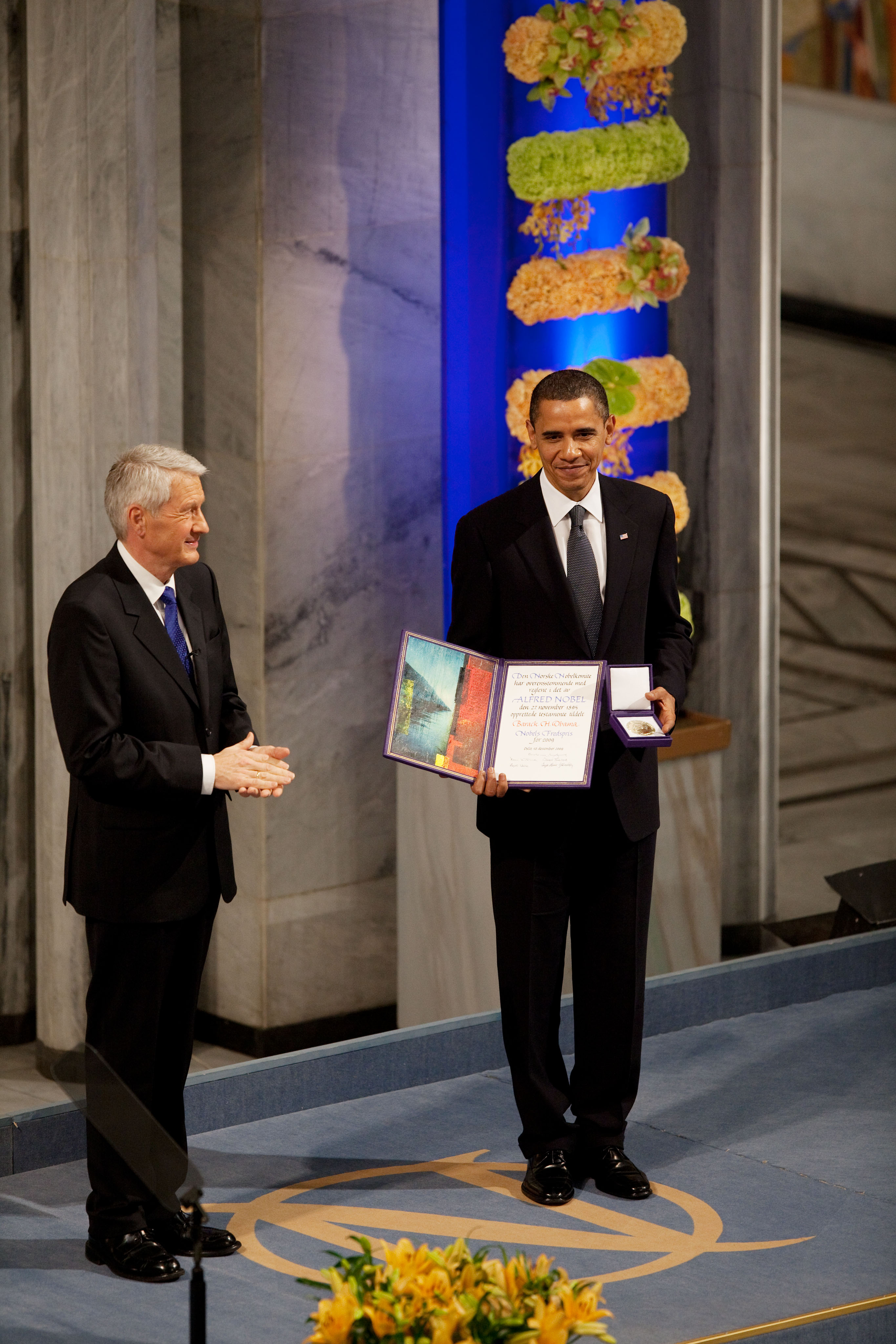
Nobel Committee chairman Thorbjørn Jagland presents to U.S. President Barack Obama with the 2009 Nobel Peace Prize medal and diploma during the Nobel Peace Prize ceremony in Rådhuset Main Hall at Oslo City Hall, in December 2009.

=== January ===
- 1 January:
- Same-sex marriage became legal in Norway when a gender neutral marriage bill was enacted after being passed by the Norwegian legislature in June 2008. Norway became the first Scandinavian country and the sixth country in the world to legalize same-sex marriage.
- A new Norwegian prostitution law (Sexkjøpsloven) bans the buying of sexual favours rather than selling (the client commits a crime, but not the prostitute).

=== March ===
- 10 March – Varg Vikernes is released on parole having served almost 16 years of a 21 years (life) sentence for murder.

=== July ===
- 31 July – Full City oil spill: the Panama-flagged bulk carrier, Full City, operated by COSCO, experienced engine failure and ran aground near Langesund, Telemark, Norway during a storm, spilling 200 tons of heavy bunker fuel oil in a sensitive wildlife area.

=== September ===
- 14 September – The 2009 Parliamentary election takes place. Although the opposition received more votes, the governing Red-Green Coalition obtained more seats in parliament. This allowed Jens Stoltenberg to continue as prime minister.

=== December ===
- 9 December – The Norwegian spiral anomaly initially shook thousands of witnesses in Northern Norway, as well as people across the globe, when what was later explained as a misfired Russian missile caused a spectacular light formation in the sky. The phenomenon was observed in the dark morning sky from Trøndelag through Finnmark.
- 10 December – The 2009 Nobel Peace Prize was awarded to U.S. President Barack Obama in Oslo.

=== Full date unknown ===
- InFiber, a Norwegian telecommunication company is founded.

== Popular culture ==
=== Music ===
- 16 May – Norway wins the Eurovision Song Contest 2009 with the song Fairytale performed by Alexander Rybak, with a record-breaking 387 points.

=== Sports ===
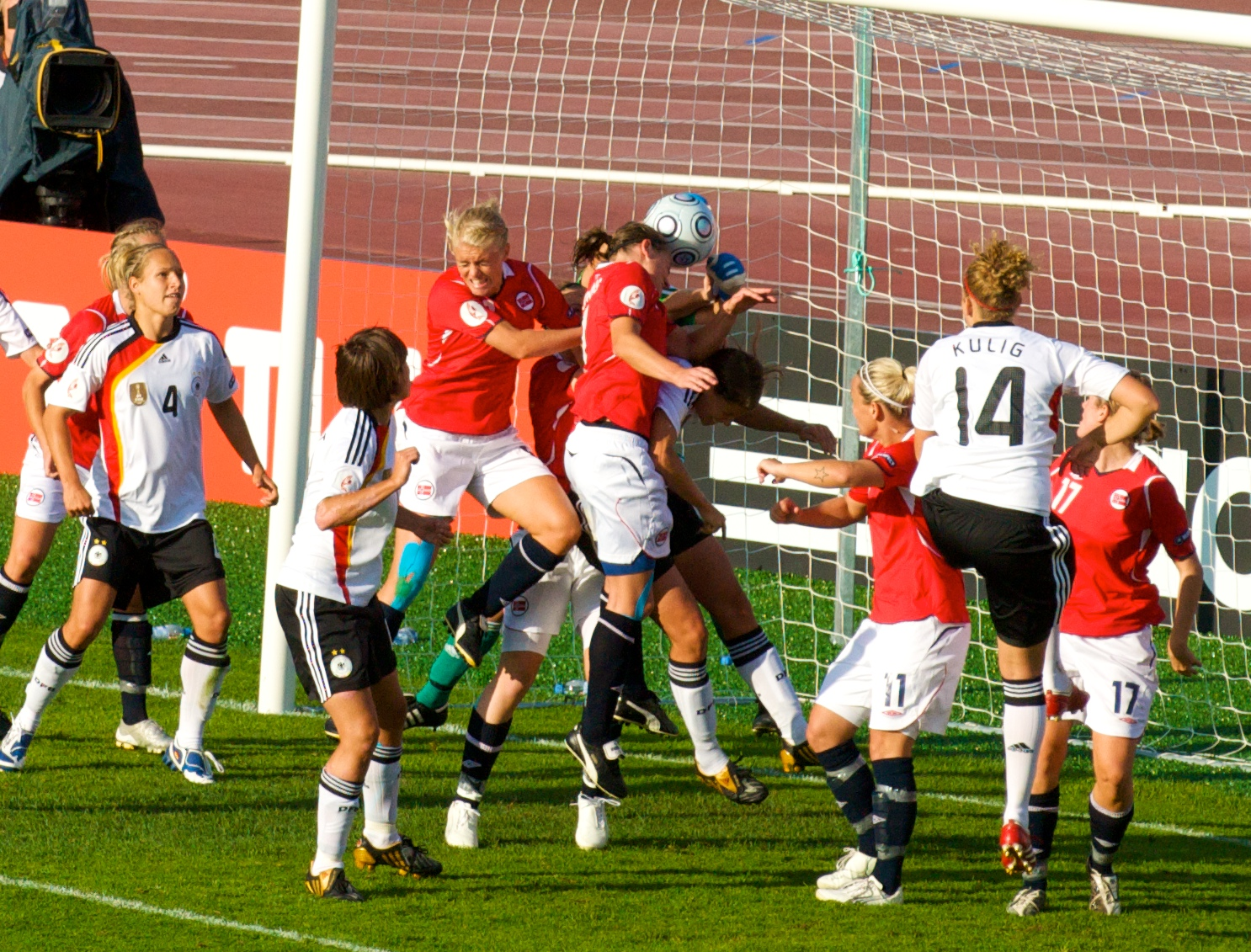
Norway playing Germany in the UEFA Women's Euro group stage on 24 August.

- 29 January – Norway wins the ninth place match at the 2009 World Men's Handball Championship, having been eliminated in the main round.
- Norway win the European Women's U-19 Handball Championship.
- Karoline Bjerkeli Grøvdal wins two gold medals at the 2009 European Athletics Junior Championships.
- 9 July – Thor Hushovd wins Stage 6 of the 2009 Tour de France, and eventually wins the green jersey.
- 18 July – Christina Vukicevic wins Norway's only gold medal at the 2009 European Athletics U23 Championships, in the 100 metres hurdles.
- 1 August – At the 2009 World Aquatics Championships, Ingvild Snildal wins her only World Championship medal, a bronze in the 50 metre butterfly.
- 21 August – At the 2009 World Championships in Athletics, Trond Nymark finishes second in the 50 kilometres walk, later upgraded to a gold medal following the disqualification of the winner.
- 23 August – Double Olympic champion Andreas Thorkildsen wins his only World Championships gold medal in the javelin throw.
- 7 September – Norway reaches the semi-final of the UEFA Women's Euro 2009, losing there to Germany.
- 20 December – Norway win the bronze final at the 2009 World Women's Handball Championship.

=== Literature ===
- Per Petterson is awarded the Nordic Council Literature Prize, for I Curse the River of Time.

== Anniversaries ==
- 150 years since the birth of author Knut Hamsun on 4 August 1859
- 100 years since the founding of the Norwegian Association of the Blind and Partially Sighted (Norges Blindeforbund) on 22 October 1909
- 100 years since the establishment of the Norwegian National Academy of Fine Arts (Statens kunstakademi) on 29 November 1909
- 75 years since the Tafjorden tsunami killed 41 people in Tafjord in Møre og Romsdal on 7 April 1934. The tsunami was triggered by landslide.

== Notable deaths ==
=== January ===
- 2 January – John Olav Larssen, evangelical preacher and missionary (b. 1927)
- 3 January –
  - Torleiv Moren, painter (b. 1911)
  - Kjelfrid Brusveen, cross-country skier (b. 1926)
- 4 January –
  - Arvid Knutsen, soccer player and coach (b. 1944)
  - Leif Herbrand Eriksen, journalist and politician (b. 1921)
  - Odd Østbye, journalist and politician (b. 1925)
- 6 January –
  - Magne Rommetveit, philologist (b. 1918)
  - Eldar Hagen, ski salesman and sports official (b. 1918)
- 8 January – Björn Haugan, operatic lyric tenor
- 11 January – Jon Tvedt, mountain runner (b. 1966)
- 12 January –
  - Jack Erik Kjuus, anti-immigration activist (b. 1927)
  - Arne Næss, philosopher (b. 1912)
  - Knut Eidem, journalist (b. 1918)
- 14 January – John Sveinsson, footballer (b. 1922)
- 17 January – Otto Birger Morcken, chess player (b. 1910)
- 21 January – Astrid Folstad, actress (b. 1932)
- 24 January –
  - Kåre Berg, professor in medical genetics (b. 1932)
  - Herman Pedersen, politician (b. 1928)
- 29 January –
  - Olaf Øen, politician (b. 1925)
  - Sjur Refsdal, astronomer (b. 1935)
- 31 January – Arne E. Holm, artist and architect (b. 1911)

=== February ===
- 1 February – Odd Torgeir Rusten, politician (b. 1925)
- 2 February – Fredrik Kayser, resistance member (b. 1918)
- 3 February – Åsa Solberg Iversen, politician (b. 1929)
- 4 February – Arnljot Eggen, lyricist (b. 1923)
- 8 February – Wenche Klouman Kerr, actress (b. 1918)
- 10 February – Eva Gustavson, opera singer (b. 1917, died in the US)
- 12 February – Willy Haugli, jurist and former Oslo chief of police (b. 1927)
- 14 February – Kjersti Graver, jurist and consumer ombudsman (b. 1945)
- 19 February – Jan E. Mellbye, agrarian leader (b. 1913)
- 21 February – Brynjulf Alver, folklorist (b. 1924)
- 23 February – Sverre Fehn, architect (b. 1924)
- 26 February – Ingebjørg Karmhus, politician (b. 1936)
- 28 February – Finn Christensen, artist (b. 1920)

=== March ===
- 4 March – Triztán Vindtorn, poet (b. 1942).
- 5 March – Bjørg Lødøen, artist (b. 1931)
- 6 March – Arild Eik, diplomat (b. 1943)
- 10 March – Geir Killingland, modeling agency executive (b. 1953).
- 13 March – Anne Brown, opera singer (b. 1912).
- 16 March – Mons Espelid, politician (b. 1926)
- 17 March – Jan Mohr, geneticist (b. 1921)
- 23 March – Lars Arentz-Hansen, barrister (b. 1927)
- 24 March – Ole Edvard Borgen, Methodist leader (b. 1925)
- 25 March – Knut Selmer, law professor (b. 1924)
- 26 March – Arne Bendiksen, singer, composer and producer (b. 1926).
- 28 March – Inger Lise Gjørv, politician (b. 1938)

=== April ===
- 2 April – Guttorm Hansen, writer and politician (b. 1920)
- 4 April – Jone Vadla, politician (b. 1923)
- 5 April –
  - Ole Gabriel Ueland, politician (b. 1931)
  - Reidun Røed, resistance member (b. 1921)
- 12 April –
  - Hans Kleppen, ski jumper (b. 1907)
  - Jens Balchen, civil engineer (b. 1926)
- 16 April – Svein Longva, economist and civil servant (b. 1943)
- 18 April – Thor Hernes, footballer and sports official (b. 1926)
- 20 April – Ola M. Steinholt, bishop (b. 1934)
- 26 April – Ivar Ramstad, discus thrower (b. 1924)
- 26 April – Geir Hovig, radio presenter (b. 1944)
- 29 April – Steinar Lem, environmentalist (b. 1951)
- 29 April – Arne Riis, actor (b. 1923)
- 30 April – Bjørn Lothe, politician (b. 1952)

=== May ===
- 1 May – Torstein Grythe, conductor (b. 1918)
- 2 May – Herbert Svenkerud, translator (b. 1927)
- 12 May – Thomas Nordseth-Tiller, screenwriter (b. 1980)
- 13 May – Berit Erbe, actor and theatre historian (b. 1923)
- 19 May – Sjur Brækhus, law professor (b. 1918)
- 20 May – Randi Lindtner Næss, actress and singer (b. 1905)
- 22 May – Asle Sjåstad, alpine skier (b. 1930)

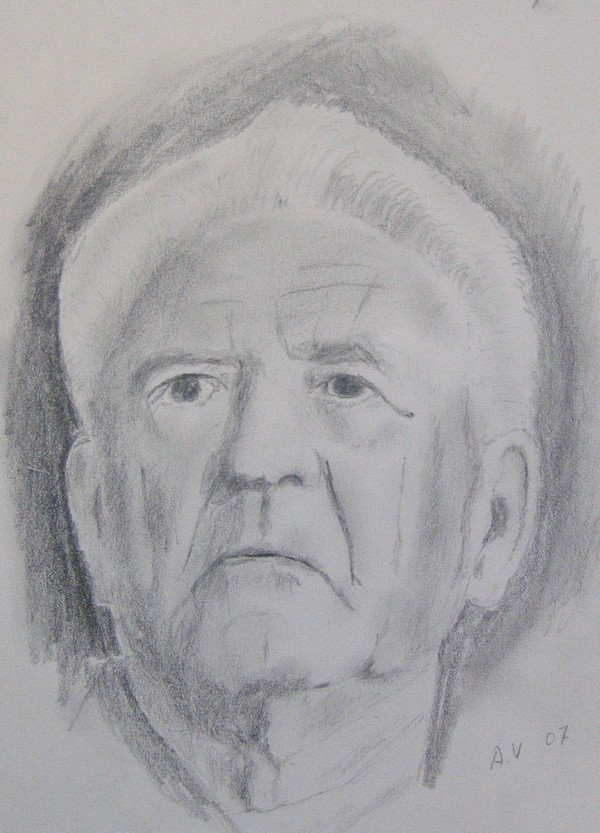
Haakon Lie

- 25 May –
  - Haakon Lie, politician (b. 1905)
  - Rolf Brahde, astronomer (b. 1919)
- 31 May – Ingebjørg Sem, actress (b. 1931)

=== June ===
- 1 June – Åse Fosli, politician (b. 1924)
- 3 June –
  - Geir Høgsnes, sociologist (b. 1950)
  - Olav S. Platou, architect (b. 1918)
- 9 June – Arne Tovik, newspaper editor and journalist (b. 1956)
- 11 June – Jakob Kjersem, long-distance runner (b. 1925)
- 14 June – Ragnar Frislid, writer, photographer and environmentalist (b. 1926)
- 17 June – Erik Naggum, programmer (b. 1965)
- 18 June – Elisabeth Schweigaard Selmer, politician and judge (b. 1923)
- 22 June –
  - Kaare Langlete, lord chamberlain (b. 1931)
  - Anders Bye, novelist (b. 1933)
- 30 June – Mosse Jørgensen, education reform activist (b. 1921)

=== July ===
- 1 July – Gerd Vollum, politician (b. 1920)
- 4 July – Hildur Odlaug Os, politician (b. 1913)
- 6 July – Marius Eriksen, skier, fighter pilot, model and actor (b. 1922)
- 9 July –
  - Ole Johannes Kløv, politician (b. 1925)
  - Egil Arne Braathen, billionaire (b. 1917)
- 10 July – Ebba Haslund, author (b. 1917)
- 17 July – Per Meinich, economist (b. 1931)
- 24 July – Terje Moe, architect (b. 1933)
- 25 July – Erling Kristiansen, cyclist (b. 1932)
- 28 July – Kjell Colding, diplomat and politician (b. 1931)

=== August ===
- 3 August – Oddvar Korme, journalist (b. 1925)
- 4 August – Ole A. Sørli, manager and record producer (b. 1946)
- 5 August – Bjarne Berg-Sæther, politician (b. 1919)
- 8 August – Pål Kraby, barrister and businessman (b. 1932)
- 9 August –
  - Leif Husebye, newspaper editor (b. 1926)
  - Vince Sulyok, librarian and poet (b. 1932)
- 14 August – Torstein Slungård, politician (b. 1931)
- 24 August – Leif Flengsrud, cyclist (b. 1922)
- 26 August –
  - Birger Skeie, businessman (b. 1951)
  - Per Christensen, actor (b. 1934)
- 28 August – Ernst Magne Johansen, painter (b. 1926)
- 29 August – Inger Johanne Nossum, rector (b. 1930)
- 30 August –
  - Kiki Sørum, fashion journalist (b. 1939)
  - Åse Wentzel, singer (b. 1924)
- 31 August –
  - Aksel Fossen, politician (b. 1919)
  - Asbjørn Aarseth, philologist (b. 1935)

=== September ===
- 1 September – Per Nyhaug, jazz drummer (b. 1926)
- 4 September – Kåre Karlsen, politician (b. 1930)
- 7 September – Torstein Tranøy, journalist (b. 1964)
- 15 September – Torfinn Bjørnaas, resistance member (b. 1914)
- 17 September – Christian Petersen, ice hockey player (b. 1937)
- 22 September –
  - Olaf Dufseth, skier (b. 1917)
  - Ada Madssen, sculptor (b. 1917)
- 27 September – Martha Schrøder, politician (b. 1918)
- 28 September – Elisabeth Bang, actress (b. 1922)
- 29 September – Gunnar Haugan, actor (b. 1925)

=== October ===
- 1 October – Gunnar Haarberg, television presenter (b. 1917)
- 1 October – Bjarne Karsten Vatne, politician (b. 1926)
- 9 October –
  - Arne Bakker, football and bandy player (b. 1930)
  - Paul Reine, politician (b. 1932)
- 13 October – Atle Jebsen, ship-owner (b. 1935)
- 14 October – Hans Chr. Mamen, local historian and priest (b. 1919)
- 15 October – Tollak B. Sirnes, physician, psychiatrist and pharmacologist (b. 1922)
- 17 October –
  - Kurt Nordbø, politician (b. 1931)
  - Egil Oddvar Larsen, politician (b. 1923)
- 20 October – Carl Fredrik Lowzow, politician (b. 1927)
- 21 October – Wilhelm Elsrud, forester (b. 1921)
- 23 October – Ragnvald Høier, physicist (b. 1938)
- 25 October – Gerhard Knoop, theatre director (b. 1920)
- 27 October – Marit Trætteberg, chemist (b. 1930)
- 29 October – Olav Hodne, missionary (b. 1921)

=== November ===
- 5 November – Nini Anker Dessen, textile artist (b. 1937)
- 6 November – Kjell Bartholdsen, jazz musician (b. 1938)
- 7 November – Arne Natland, footballer (b. 1927)
- 11 November – Helge Reiss, actor (b. 1928)
- 12 November – Elisabeth Aasen, politician (b. 1922)
- 16 November – Anne-Sofie Strømnæs, resistance member (b. 1920)
- 20 November – Leiv Erdal, politician (b. 1915)
- 21 November – Gerhard Aspheim, trombonist (b. 1930)
- 22 November – Eva Sivertsen, philologist (b. 1922)
- 24 November – Alexander Pihl, professor of medicine (b. 1920)
- 28 November – Bjartmar Gjerde, politician (b. 1931)

=== December ===
- 3 December – Åsmund L. Strømnes, educationalist (b. 1927)
- 3 December – Lulla Einrid Fossland, politician (b. 1917)
- 9 December – Mia Berner, writer (b. 1923)
- 9 December – Kjell Eugenio Laugerud García, Norwegian-born President of Guatemala (b. 1930, died in Guatemala)
- 11 December – Erland Steenberg, politician (b. 1919)
- 11 December – Karl Erik Zachariassen, zoologist (b. 1942)
- 12 December – Josef Monsrud, resistance member (b. 1922)
- 13 December – Arne Næss, politician (b. 1925)
- 15 December – Per Ulven, harness racing coach (b. 1925)
- 18 December – Sidsel Tone Berntsberg, sculptor (b. 1947)
- 21 December – Johan E. Holand, journalist and politician (b. 1919)
- 21 December – Bjørg Engh, actress (b. 1932)
- 25 December – Knut Haugland, resistance member and explorer (b. 1917)
- 26 December – Peder Lunde, yacht racer (b. 1918)
- 26 December –Tarald Weisteen, colonel (b. 1916)
- 26 December –Odd Kirkeby, politician (b. 1923)
- 29 December – Ottar Landfald, politician (b. 1919)
- 29 December – Harold Nicolaisen, politician (b. 1929)
- 30 December – Anne Valen Hestetun, politician (b. 1920)
- 31 December – Rodney Riise, ice hockey player (b. 1942)

=== Full date unknown ===
- Fritz Hodne, historian (b. 1932)
- Bjørn Heggelund, police chief (b. 1924)
- Roar Stub Andersen, resistance member (b. 1921)
- Arvid Berglind, politician (b. 1924)
- Per Ulriksen, politician (b. 1937)
- Robert Bergsaker, missionary (b. 1914)
- Alf Blyverket, musician (b. 1929)
- Tore Brantenberg, architect and writer (b. 1934)
- Finn Sollie, political scientist (b. 1928)
- Jan Erik Stenberg, Paralympic athlete (b. 1944)
- Thorstein Thelle, popular writer (b. 1913)
- Kåre I. Torp, industrialist (b. 1923)
- Nils Viker, nature writer (b. 1911)
- Inger Vonheim, short story writer (b. 1943)
- Sverre Kongshavn, politician (b. 1926)
- Hans Fredrik Marthinussen, judge (b. 1918)
- Bernt Daniel Odfjell, ship-owner (b. 1908)
- Ivar Bjerknes, painter (b. 1922)

== See also ==
- 2009-2010 flu pandemic in Norway
- 2009 in Norwegian music
