= Sulyok =

Sulyok is a surname. Notable people with the surname include:

- Béla Sulyok (1904–1977), Hungarian economist
- Imre Sulyok (?–1578), Hungarian politician
- Mária Sulyok (1908–1987), Hungarian actress
- Tamás Sulyok (born 1956), Hungarian lawyer and politician
- Vince Sulyok (1932–2009), Hungarian-Norwegian librarian and poet
