= Sorum (disambiguation) =

Sorum is a 2001 South Korean horror film.

Sorum or Sørum may also refer to:

== People ==
- Sørum (surname)
- Felix Unger Sörum (born 2005), Swedish ice hockey player
- Matt Sorum (born 1960), American drummer and percussionist

== Places ==
- Sørum, a municipality in Norway
- Sorum, South Dakota, an unincorporated community in the United States

== Other uses ==
- Sorum-class tugboat, 1972 Russian tugboat class
