= Ulven =

Ulven is a surname. Notable people with the surname include:

- Kjetil Ulven (born 1967), Norwegian ski-orienteering competitor
- Per Ulven (1925–2009), Norwegian harness racer
- Tor Ulven (1953–1995), Norwegian poet

== See also ==
- Ulven detention camp, concentration camp in Norway
