= Meinich =

Meinich is a surname. Notable people with the surname include:

- Herman Meinich (1868–1948), Norwegian government official
- Jørgen Meinich (1820–1911), Norwegian jurist and industrialist
- Per Meinich (1931–2009), Norwegian economist

== See also ==
- Minich
