= Leif Ericson (disambiguation) =

Leif Erikson (c.980 – c.1020) was an Icelandic explorer who was the first European known to have discovered North America.

Leif Ericson or alternative spellings may also refer to:

== People ==
- Leif Erickson (actor) (1911–1986), American actor
- Leif Erickson (politician) (1906–1998), American politician
- Leif Eriksson (footballer) (born 1942), Swedish footballer
- Leif Eriksson (pipemaker) (born 1946), developer of the revived Swedish bagpipe
- Leif Ericsson (swimmer) (born 1955), Swedish swimmer

== Other ==
- MV Leif Ericson, a Canadian passenger and vehicle ferry
- Leif Erikson (band), a British indie band
- Leif Erikson (ship), a 1926 Viking ship replica
- Leif Erickson, Hagbard Celine's submarine in The Illuminatus! Trilogy
- Leiv Eiriksson, an oil platform owned by Ocean Rig
- "Leif Erikson", a song from the album Turn On The Bright Lights by rock band Interpol

== See also ==
- Leif Eriksen (disambiguation)
