= Aarseth =

Aarseth is a Norwegian surname. Notable people with the surname include:

- Asbjørn Aarseth (1935–2009), Norwegian literary historian
- Espen Aarseth (born 1965), Norwegian media scholar
- Ivar Aarseth (1889–1972), Norwegian politician
- Sverre Aarseth (born 1934), British astronomer
- Euronymous, born Øystein Aarseth (1968–1993), Norwegian musician

== See also ==
- 9836 Aarseth, main-belt asteroid
