= Dagfinn Grønoset =

Norwegian journalist and writer (1920–2008)

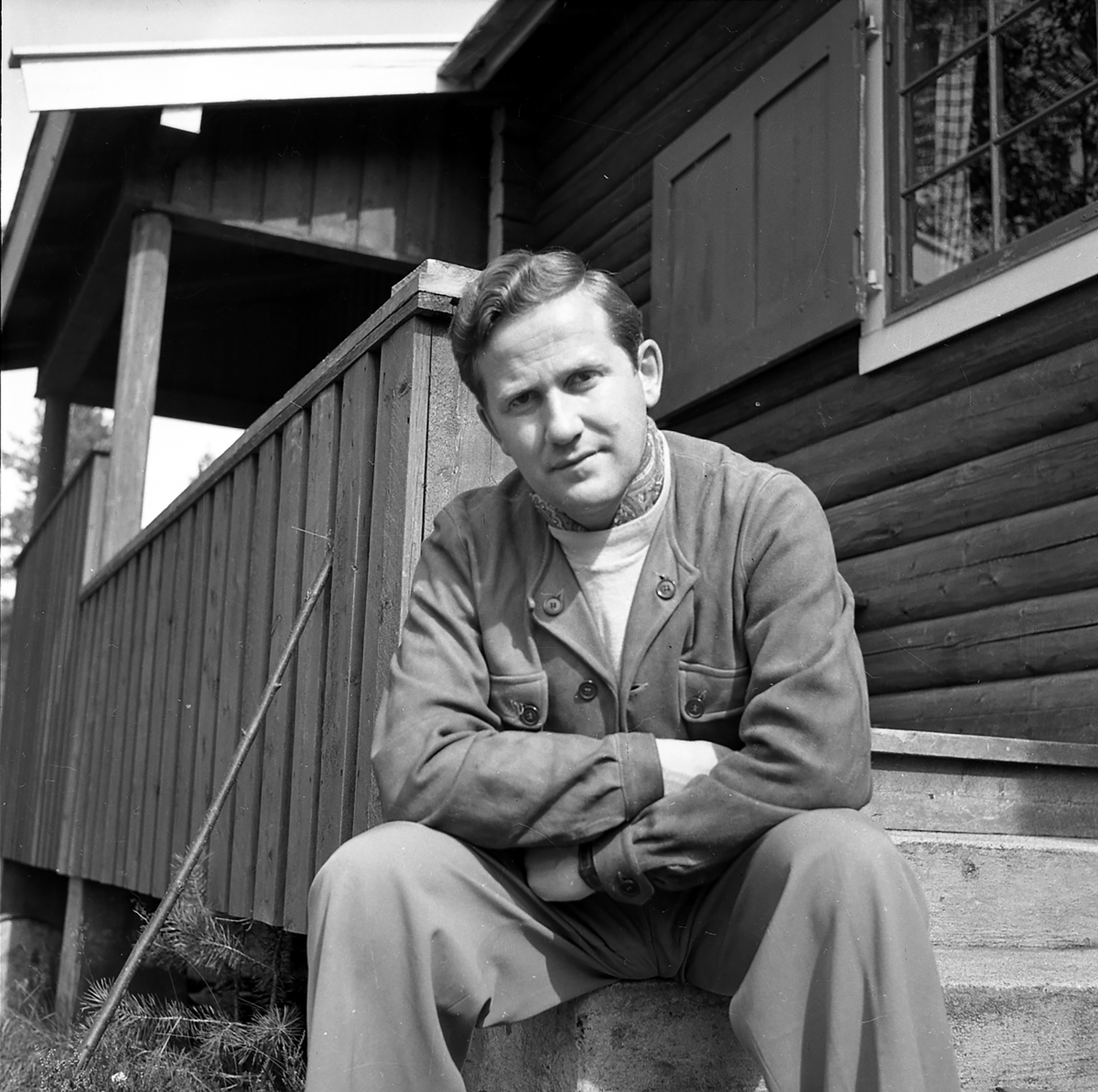
- Born: 4 April 1920; Trysil, Norway
- Died: 28 January 2008 (aged 87)
- Occupations: journalist and author
- Notable work: Anna i ødemarka (1972)
- Awards: King's Medal of Merit (gold)

Dagfinn Grønoset (4 April 1920 – 28 January 2008) was a journalist and writer born in Trysil Municipality, Norway, and living in Elverum Municipality most of his life. He is known for his books about wilderness and people living off the beaten track. His literary debut was Vandring i villmark from 1952. Anna i Ødemarka from 1972 became one of the biggest commercial successes for Norwegian publishing houses, and is later translated into fourteen languages, issued in seventeen countries.

== Personal life ==
Grønoset was born in Trysil Municipality. a son of farmer and forest owner Daniel Grønoset and Minda Augusta Skogli. In 1957 he married journalist Rise Vestergaard.

== Career ==
Grønoset started working for the Elverum-based newspaper Østlendingen at the age of 19, and was assigned with the newspaper until 1974, when he became a full-time author.

He made his literary debut in 1952, with the book Vandring i villmark, based on his own hiking experiences in the Femunden district. Further books are Finnskog og trollskap (1953), a biography of Hallgeir Brenden from 1956, Nitahå-Jussi (1957), Med Kong Olav mot nord (1959), Langs bygdevegen (1960), and I Vinjes fotspor (1960).

His book Folk fra skogene from 1970 reported on people living in the forest districts. Anna i ødemarka from 1972 portrayed one of these people in more detail, as a heroine living a hard life close to nature. The book soon became very popular, and received massive media attention such as full-page newspaper coverage and separate television programs. It has been translated into a total of 17 languages. Similar books are Tater-Milla (1974), Barnet Gud glemte (1979), and Gunhild fra skogene (1982).

He was awarded HM The King's Medal of Merit (gold) in 1980. A bust of Grønoset, sculpted by Skule Waksvik, was erected in Elverum in 1986.

== Selected bibliography ==
- Vandring i villmark (1952) Biographic reports from Femundsmarka
- Finnskog og trollskap (1953). Also film
- Gull i sporet (1956) Biography of Hallgeir Brenden
- Nitahå-Jussi (1957) Biografi of an eccentric from Finnskogen, the "Forest of the Finns"
- Med kong Olav mot nord (1959)
- Villmarksfolk (1959) Illustrated by Kjell Aukrust
- Langs bygdevegen (1960) With Vidar Sandbeck
- I Vinjes fotspor (1960) Travelogue from Sollia and Folldal
- Bella Capri (1961)
- Folk fra skogene (1970) Short stories
- Anna i ødemarka (1972)
- Tater-Milla (1974)
- Barnet Gud glemte (1979)
- Femundsmarka (1979) With Ragnar Frislid og Per Hohle
- Gunnhild fra skogene (1982)
- Furer i fedrelandet (1984). Illustrated by Kjell Aukrust
- Kvinner på veg og vidde (1986)
- Villmark og vinløv (1988) Illustrated by Kjell Aukrust and others
- Det rotfaste folket (1990) Illustrated by Kjell Aukrust and others
- Hurra for livet (1991)
- Viser ved vegen (1994)
