= Leif Eriksen =

Leif Eriksen may refer to:

- Leif Eriksen (bandy) (1918–2012), Norwegian bandy player
- Leif Herbrand Eriksen (1921–2009), Norwegian journalist and politician
- Leif Eriksen (footballer, born 1909), Norwegian football striker
- Leif Eriksen (footballer, born 1940), Norwegian football striker

== See also ==
- Leif Erikson (c. 970–c. 1020), Norse explorer from Iceland
