= Skeie =

Skeie may refer to:

== Places ==
- Skeie, Hægebostad, a village in Hægebostad Municipality in Agder county, Norway
- Skeie, Lindesnes, a village in Lindesnes Municipality in Agder county, Norway

== People ==
- Birger Skeie (1951–2009), Norwegian businessperson
- Eyvind Skeie (born 1947), Norwegian priest and author
- Geir Skeie (born 1980), Norwegian chef and Bocuse d'Or winner
- Tor Skeie (born 1965), Norwegian freestyle skier
