= Sørum (surname) =

Sørum is a Norwegian surname that may refer to

- Christin Sørum (born 1968), Norwegian long-distance runner
- Halvor Sørum (1897–1965), Norwegian trade unionist and politician
- Joachim Sørum (born 1979), Norwegian football player
- Kiki Sørum (1939–2009), Norwegian fashion journalist, editor, and author
- Knut Anders Sørum (born 1976), Norwegian singer
- Kristian Sørum, Norwegian curler
- Morten Sørum, Norwegian curler
- Wenche Sørum (born 1951), Norwegian middle-distance runner
- Thomas Sørum (born 1982), Norwegian football player
