= Cockney =

Dialect of English spoken in London

- Cockney dialect
- Native to: England
- Region: Greater London
- Language family: Indo-European: Germanic; West Germanic; Ingvaeonic; Anglic; English; British English; Cockney
- Early forms: Old English: Middle English; Early Modern English
- Writing system: Latin (English alphabet)

Language codes
- ISO 639-3: –
- Glottolog: None

Example of a Cockney accent
Voice of Danny Baker, who grew up in Bermondsey, London, recorded July 2007 from the BBC Radio 4 programme Desert Island Discs

Example of a Cockney accent
Voice of Michael Caine, who grew up in Southwark, London, recorded September 2010 from the BBC Radio 4 programme Front Row

Cockney is a dialect of the English language spoken mainly in London, particularly by Londoners from working-class and lower-middle-class families. The term Cockney is also used as a demonym for a person from London's East End, or, traditionally, born within earshot of Bow Bells.

Estuary English is an intermediate accent between Cockney and higher-class Received Pronunciation that is also widely spoken in and around London, and has diffused throughout southeastern England. In multicultural areas of London, the Cockney dialect is, to an extent, being replaced by Multicultural London English — a new form of speech with significant Cockney influence.

== Nomenclature ==
=== Etymology of Cockney ===
The earliest recorded use of the term is 1362 in passus VI of William Langland's Piers Plowman, where it is used to mean "a small, misshapen egg", from Middle English coken + ey ("a cock's egg"). Concurrently, the mythical land of luxury Cockaigne (attested from 1305) appeared under a variety of spellings, including Cockayne, Cocknay, and Cockney, and became humorously associated with the English capital London. (Note: Note, however, that the earliest attestation of this particular usage provided by the Oxford English Dictionary is from 1824 and consists of a tongue-in-cheek allusion to an existing notion of "Cockneydom".)

The meaning of Cockney comes from its use among rural Englishmen (attested in 1520) as a pejorative term for effeminate town-dwellers, (Note: "This cokneys and tytyllynges ... [delicati pueri] may abide no sorrow when they come to age ... In these great cytees as London, York, Perusy, and such ... the children be so nicely and wantonly brought up ... that commonly they can little good.) from an earlier general sense (encountered in "The Reeve's Tale" of Geoffrey Chaucer's The Canterbury Tales c. 1386) of a "cokenay" as "a child tenderly brought up" and, by extension, "an effeminate fellow" or "a milksop". This may have developed from those sources or separately, alongside such terms as "cock" and "cocker" which both have the sense of "to make a nestle-cock ... or the darling of", "to indulge or pamper". (Note: "... I shall explain myself more particularly; only laying down this as a general and certain observation for the women to consider, viz. that most children's constitutions are spoiled, or at least harmed, by cockering and tenderness.") By 1600, this meaning of Cockney was being particularly associated with the Bow Bells area. In 1617, the travel writer Fynes Moryson stated in his Itinerary that "Londoners, and all within the sound of Bow Bells, are in reproach called Cockneys." The same year, John Minsheu included the term in this newly restricted sense in his dictionary Ductor in Linguas. (Note: "A Cockney or a Cocksie, applied only to one born within the sound of Bow bell, that is in the City of London". Note, however, that his proffered etymology — from either "cock" and "neigh" or from the Latin incoctus — were both erroneous. The humorous folk etymology which grew up around the derivation from "cock" and "neigh" was preserved by Francis Grose's 1785 A Classical Dictionary of the Vulgar Tongue: "A citizen of London, being in the country, and hearing a horse neigh, exclaimed, Lord! How that horse laughs! A by-stander telling him that noise was called Neighing; the next morning, when the cock crowed, the citizen to shew he had not forgotten what was told him, cried out, Do you hear how the Cock Neighs?")

=== Other terms ===
- Cockney sparrow: Refers to the archetype of a cheerful, talkative Cockney.
- Cockney diaspora: The term Cockney diaspora refers to the migration of Cockney speakers to places outside London, especially new towns. It also refers to the descendants of those people, in areas where there was enough migration for identification with London to persist in subsequent generations.
- Mockney: Refers to a fake Cockney accent, though the term is sometimes also used as a self-deprecatory moniker by second, third, and subsequent generations of the Cockney diaspora.

== Region ==
Initially, when London consisted of little more than the walled City, Cockneys referred to all Londoners, by 1600 being particularly associated with the Bow Bells area. This lingered at least into the 19th century. As the city grew, the definitions shifted to alternatives based on dialect or more specific areas; the East End and the area within earshot of Bow Bells.

The East End of London and the vicinity of Bow Bells are often used interchangeably, representing the identity of the East End. The region within the audible range of the bells varies depending on the direction of the wind, but there is a correlation between the two geographic definitions under the typical prevailing wind conditions. The term can apply to East Londoners who do not speak the dialect and those who do.

=== London's East End ===
The traditional core districts of the East End include the Middlesex towns of Bethnal Green, Whitechapel, Spitalfields, Stepney, Wapping, Limehouse, Poplar, Haggerston, Shadwell, Shoreditch, Hackney, Hoxton, Bow and Mile End. Nearly all of these areas had originally been part of the Manor and Parish of Stepney. In the 1600s and 1700s a Cockney's Feast, also later known as the Stepney Feast, was held in Stepney each May. The purpose of the event was to raise money so that Stepney boys could be apprenticed in the maritime trades.

The informal definition of the East End has gradually expanded to areas including Poplar, Stratford, West Ham and Canning Town, as these have formed part of London's growing conurbation.

In the late Victorian period, a brash and loud "cockney swell" known as an 'Arry, became a well-known caricature of East End Londoners, as popularised by Punch magazine. Associated with wild revelry and "exuberant cockney horseplay", 'Arries could be found on excursions across the UK, but were particularly associated with certain locations within easy reach of London, such as Southend-on-Sea.

=== Bow Bells' audible range ===
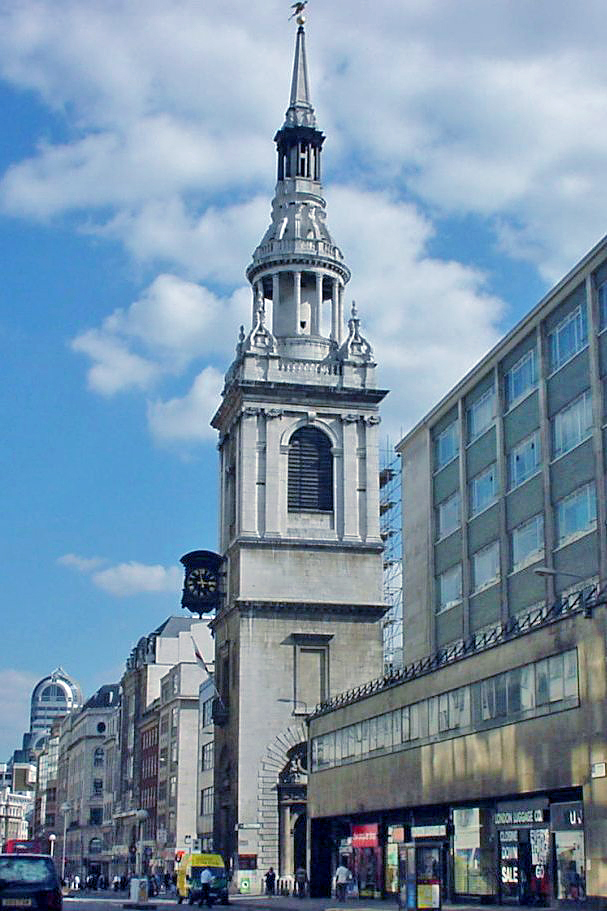
The church of St Mary-le-Bow

The church of St Mary-le-Bow is one of the oldest, largest, and historically most important churches in the City of London. The definition based on being born within earshot of the bells, cast at the Whitechapel Bell Foundry, reflects the early definition of the term as relating to all of London.

The audible range of the Bells is dependent on geography and wind conditions. The east is mostly low lying, a factor which combines with the strength and regularity of the prevailing wind, blowing from west-south-west for nearly three-quarters of the year, to carry the sound further to the east, and more often. A 2012 study showed that in the 19th century, and under typical conditions, the sound of the bells would carry as far as Clapton, Bow and Stratford in the east but only as far as Southwark to the south and Holborn in the west. An earlier study suggested the sound would have carried even further. The 2012 study showed that in the modern era, noise pollution means that the bells can only be heard as far as Shoreditch. According to legend, Dick Whittington heard the bells 4.5 miles away at Highgate Hill, in what is now north London. The studies mean that it is credible that Whittington might have heard them on one of the infrequent days that the wind blows from the south.

The church of St Mary-le-Bow was destroyed in 1666 by the Great Fire of London and rebuilt by Sir Christopher Wren. Although the bells were destroyed again in 1941 in the Blitz, they had fallen silent on 13 June 1940 as part of the British anti-invasion preparations of World War II. Before they were replaced in 1961, there was a period when, by the "within earshot" definition, no "Bow Bell" Cockneys could be born. The use of such a literal definition produces other problems since the area around the church is no longer residential, and the noise pollution in that area combined with the absence of maternity wards there means that few are born within earshot.

=== Blurred definitions ===
Regional definitions are sometimes blurred. Ahead of the 2024–25 season, West Ham United released an away shirt which it called the "Cockney Kit". The promotional material celebrated a Cockney identity for East London based on a territory rather than dialect.

The kit featured the Bow Bells on the reverse as a symbol of the area, and the promotional video included the church of St Mary-le-Bow and parts of East London within earshot of the bells – such as Brick Lane, Upper Clapton and Stratford – as well as a scene in Romford, in suburban East London.

== Dialect history, spread, and evolution ==
Working-class Londoners have distinctive accents and occasionally use rhyming slang.

Recording from 1899 of "My Old Dutch" by Albert Chevalier, a music hall performer who based his material on life as a Cockney costermonger in Victorian London.

John Camden Hotten, in his Slang Dictionary of 1859, refers to "their use of a peculiar slang language" when describing the costermongers of London's East End. Linguistic historian and researcher of earlier dialects Alexander John Ellis in 1890 stated that Cockney developed owing to the influence of Essex dialect on London speech.

The early development of Cockney vocabulary is obscure, but appears to have been heavily influenced by Essex and related eastern dialects, while borrowings from Yiddish, including kosher (originally Hebrew, via Yiddish, meaning legitimate) and shtum (/ʃtʊm/ originally German, via Yiddish, meaning mute), as well as Romani, for example wonga (meaning money, from the Romani "wanga" meaning coal), and cushty (Kushty) (from the Romani kushtipen, meaning good) reflect the influence of those groups on the development of the speech.

The Survey of English Dialects took a recording from a long-time resident of Hackney in the 1950s, and the BBC made another recording in 1999 which showed how the accent had changed.

A dialectological study of Leytonstone in 1964 found that the area's dialect was very similar to the Cockney recorded in Bethnal Green by linguist Eva Sivertsen, but there were still some features that distinguished the two areas.

A combination of several interrelated factors, including the deindustrialisation of the East End of London, the slum clearance programme between the 1920s and 1960s, and the construction of new and expanded towns in southeastern England, gave rise to the so-called "Cockney Diaspora". The speech varieties of many areas beyond the capital have been strongly influenced by migration from London, including the new towns of Hemel Hempstead, Basildon, and Harlow, and expanded towns such as Grays, Chelmsford and Southend.

Writing in 1981, the dialectologist Peter Wright identified the building of the Becontree estate in Dagenham as influential in the spread of the Cockney dialect. This vast estate was built by the Corporation of London to house poor East Enders in a previously rural area of Essex. The residents typically kept their Cockney dialect rather than adopt an Essex dialect. Wright also reports that the Cockney dialect spread along the main railway routes to towns in the surrounding counties as early as 1923, spreading further after World War II when many refugees left London owing to the bombing, and continuing to speak Cockney in their new homes.

A more distant example where the accent stands out is Thetford in Norfolk, which tripled in size from 1957 in a deliberate attempt to attract Londoners by providing social housing funded by the London County Council.

=== Estuary English ===
By the 1980s and 1990s, many of the accent features had spread into the more general speech of the southeastern quadrant of England, developing an accent, or wide class of accents, called Estuary English. An Estuary speaker will use some but not all Cockney sounds. The term Estuary English first came to public prominence in an article by David Rosewarne in the Times Educational Supplement in October 1984. Rosewarne argued that it may eventually replace Received Pronunciation in southern England. The phonetician John C. Wells collected media references to Estuary English online. Writing in April 2013, he argued that research by Joanna Przedlacka "demolished the claim that EE was a single entity sweeping the southeast. Rather, we have various sound changes emanating from working-class London speech, each spreading independently". Some of these features have arguably become, or are becoming, standard in southern England.

=== Possible influence on other English dialects ===
Certain features of Cockney – Th-fronting, L-vocalisation, T-glottalisation, and the fronting of the GOAT and GOOSE vowels – have become common across the southeastern quadrant of England and, to a lesser extent, other areas of Britain. However, linguist Clive Upton has noted that these features have occurred independently in certain other dialects, such as Th-fronting in Yorkshire and L-vocalisation in parts of Scotland.

=== Possible influence on Scottish dialects ===
Studies have indicated that the heavy use of southern England accents on television and radio may have helped the spread of certain Cockney features since the 1960s, including to Scotland.

Studies have indicated that working-class adolescents in areas such as Glasgow have begun to use certain aspects of Cockney and other Anglicisms in their speech, infiltrating the traditional Glasgow patter. For example, Th-fronting is commonly found, and typical Scottish features such as the postvocalic /r/ are reduced. Research suggests the use of English speech characteristics is likely to be a result of the influence of London and wider regional accents featuring heavily on television, such as the popular BBC One soap opera EastEnders. However, such claims remain contentious.

=== 21st-century research ===
Linguistic research conducted in the early 2010s suggests that, since the 1980s, some aspects of the Cockney accent are declining in usage within multicultural areas, having been displaced by Multicultural London English, a multiethnolect particularly common amongst young people from diverse backgrounds. Nevertheless, the glottal stop, double negatives, and the vocalisation of the dark L (and other features of Cockney speech) are among the Cockney influences on Multicultural London English, and some rhyming slang terms are still in common usage.

An influential July 2010 report by Paul Kerswill, professor of sociolinguistics at Lancaster University, Multicultural London English: the emergence, acquisition, and diffusion of a new variety, predicted that the Cockney accent would disappear from London's streets within 30 years. The study, funded by the Economic and Social Research Council, said that the accent, is being replaced among younger speakers in London by a new hybrid dialect. Kerswill said "Cockney in the East End is now transforming itself into Multicultural London English, a new, melting-pot mixture of all those people living here who learned English as a second language" and their native English-speaking children.

== Typical dialect features ==
Ranges of the short monophthongs of Cockney on a vowel chart, from Beaken (1971:189, 193). The schwa /ə/ is the word-internal variety; the word-final variety often overlaps with /a/ or even /æ/, which do not occur word-finally. /e/ can overlap with /æ/ in the [ɛ] region.

Long monophthongs of Cockney on a vowel chart, from Beaken (1971:197). /ɪː, eː, ɔː, æː/ can feature a centering glide: [ɪə, eə, ɔə, æə]. /æː/ has an alternative pronunciation [æw], shown on the chart. The CURE vowel /ʊː/ is not shown.

Diphthongs of Cockney on a vowel chart, from Beaken (1971:197, 200). /ɪj/ and /ʉw/ are shown on the chart with an unrounded mid central starting point: [əj, əw]. /əw/ too begins more open: [ɐw], in the STRUT area.

As with most modern accents of England, Cockney is non-rhotic. A final -er is pronounced [ə] or lowered [ɐ] in broad Cockney. As with all or nearly all non-rhotic accents, the paired lexical sets COMMA and LETTER, PALM/BATH and START, THOUGHT and NORTH/FORCE, are merged. Thus, the last syllable of words such as cheetah can be pronounced [ɐ] as well in broad Cockney.

A broad /ɑː/ is used in words such as bath, grass and demand. This originated in London in the 16th–17th centuries and is also part of Received Pronunciation (RP).

The accent features T-glottalisation, with use of the glottal stop as an allophone of /t/ in various positions, including after a stressed syllable. Glottal stops also occur, albeit less frequently, for /k/ and /p/, and occasionally for mid-word consonants. For example, Richard Whiteing spelled "Hyde Park" as Hy' Par'. Like and light can be homophones. "Clapham" can be said as Cla'am (i.e., [ˈkl̥æʔm̩]). This feature results in Cockney being often mentioned in textbooks about Semitic languages while explaining how to pronounce the glottal stop. /t/ may also be flapped intervocalically, e.g. utter [ˈaɾə]. London /p, t, k/ are often aspirated in intervocalic and final environments, e.g., upper [ˈapʰə], utter [ˈatʰə], rocker [ˈɹɔkʰə], up [ˈaʔpʰ], out [ˈæːʔtʰ], rock [ˈɹɔʔkʰ], where RP is traditionally described as having the unaspirated variants. Also, in broad Cockney at least, the degree of aspiration is typically greater than in RP, and may often also involve some degree of affrication [pᶲʰ, tˢʰ, kˣʰ]. Affricatives may be encountered in initial, intervocalic, and final position.

Cockney also demonstrates:

- Th-fronting:
  - /θ/ can become [f] in any environment. [fɪn] "thin", [mæfs] "maths".
  - /ð/ can become [v] in any environment except word-initially when it can be [ð, ð̞, d, l, ʔ, ∅]. [dæj] "they", [ˈbɔvə] "bother".
- Yod-coalescence, in words such as tune [tʃʰʉwn] or reduce [ɹɪˈdʒʉws] (compare traditional RP [ˈtjuːn, ɹɪˈdjuːs]).
- The alveolar stops /t/, /d/ are often omitted in informal Cockney, in non-prevocalic environments, including some that cannot be omitted in Received Pronunciation. Examples include [ˈdæzɡənə] Dad's gonna and [ˈtəːn ˈlef] turn left.
- H-dropping. Sivertsen considers that [h] is to some extent a stylistic marker of emphasis in Cockney.

Vowels of Cockney
	Front		Central		Back	
	Short	Long	Short	Long	Short	Long
Close	ɪ	ɪː			ʊ	(ʊː)
Mid	e	eː	ə	əː	ɔ	(ɔː)
Near-open	æ	æː				
Open	a					ɑː
Diphthongs	ɪj æj ɑj oj ʉw əw ɔw (ɒw)					

=== Phonemic correspondence ===
- /ɪ, ʊ, e, ə, əː, ɔː, æ, ɑː, əw/ correspond to the RP sounds (though /əː/ and /əw/ are most commonly written with ⟨ɜː⟩ and ⟨əʊ⟩, respectively). /ɔː/ can be considered to be an allophone of /ɔw/ (with both corresponding to RP /ɔː/). /ɒw/ also can be considered to be an allophone, a positional variant of /əw/ (with both corresponding to RP /əʊ/) – see below.
- /ɔ/ corresponds to RP /ɒ/.
- /a/ corresponds to RP /ʌ/.
- /ɪː, ʊː, eː/ correspond to the centering diphthongs /ɪə, ʊə, eə/ in traditional RP. /ʊː/ is often missing from Cockney, being replaced with /ɔː ~ ɔw/ or a disyllabic /ʉwə/.
- /æː/ corresponds to RP /aʊ/.
- /ɪj/ and /ʉw/ correspond to relatively less diphthongal /iː/ and /uː/ in traditional RP.
- /æj, ɑj, oj/ correspond to /eɪ, aɪ, ɔɪ/ in RP.

=== Phonetic realisation ===
The diphthong offsets are only fully close in /ɪj/ and /ʉw/: [əi̯, əʉ̯]. In all other cases, they are more similar to [ɪ̯, ʊ̯] or [e̯, o̯]. According to Beaken, /æj/ and /ɑj/ typically glide towards [e]: [æe̯, ɑe̯], /oj/ towards [ɪ]: [oɪ̯], /əw/ and the wide allophone of /æː/ towards [ʊ]: [ɐʊ̯, æʊ̯], whereas /ɔw/ and /ɒw/ both towards [o]: [ɔo̯, ɒo̯]. According to Mott, [e̯, o̯] do not occur at all as glides: [æɪ̯, ɑɪ̯, oɪ̯, ɐʊ̯, æʊ̯, ɒʊ̯] (he does not show /ɪj, ʉw, ɔw/ on his charts). Furthermore, Wells remarks on the laxness of the unrounded offset of /əw/, which is a kind of a centralised [ɤ]: [ɐɤ̯].

In the rest of the article, this is treated as a simple allophonic rule and only ⟨j⟩ and ⟨w⟩ are used for the diphthong offsets. In narrow phonetic transcription, their rounded and unrounded counterparts are written with ⟨ɥ⟩ and ⟨ɰ⟩ (phonetically [ʏ̯ ~ ø̯] and [ɯ̜̽ ~ ɤ̯] in fully narrow transcription). Only the central offglides [ə̯] and [ʉ̯] are transcribed as non-syllabic vowels due to the lack of appropriate glide symbols.

Diphthong alterations in Cockney are:

- /ɪj/ is realised as [əj~ɐj]: [bəjʔ] "beet"
- /æj/ is realised as [æj~aj]: [bæjʔ] "bait"
- /ɑj/ is realised as [ɑj] or even [ɒj] in "vigorous, dialectal" Cockney. The second element may be reduced or absent (with compensatory lengthening of the first element), so that there are variants such as [ɑ̟ə̯~ɑ̟ː]. This means that pairs such as laugh-life, Barton-biting may become homophones: [lɑːf], [ˈbɑːʔn̩]. But this neutralisation is an optional, recoverable one: [bɑjʔ] "bite"
- /oj/ is realised as [ɔ̝j~oj]: [ˈtʃʰojs] "choice"
- /ʉw/ is realised as [əʉ̯] or a monophthongal [ʉː], perhaps with little lip rounding, [ɨː] or [ʊː]: [bʉːʔ] "boot"
- /əw/ typically starts in the area of /a/, [æ̈~ɐ]. The endpoint glides towards [w], but more commonly, it is completely unrounded, i.e. [ɰ]. Thus, the most common variants are [æ̈ɰ] and [ɐɰ], with [æ̈w] and [ɐw] also being possible. The broadest Cockney variant approaches [aw]. There is also a variant that is used only by women, namely [ɐɥ ~ œ̈ɥ]. In addition, there are two monophthongal pronunciations, [ʌ̈ː] as in 'no, nah' and [œ̈], which is used in non-prominent variants. [kʰɐɰʔ] "coat"
- /ɪː, ʊː, eː, ɔː, æː/ may all feature centering glides [ɪə̯, ʊə̯, eə̯, ɔə̯, æə̯]. Alternatively, /æː/ may be realised as a closing diphthong [æw]. Wells states that "no rigid rules can be given for the distribution of monophthongal and diphthongal variants, though the tendency seems to be for the monophthongal variants to be commonest within the utterance, but the diphthongal realisations in utterance-final position, or where the syllable in question is otherwise prominent." Furthermore, the main difference between /ɪː, eː, ɔː, æː/ and /ɪ, e, ɔ, æ/ is length, with the quality being secondary. The contrast appears only in the word-internal position, exactly where the monophthongal variants of /ɪː, eː, ɔː, æː/ are the most common. Thus, word pairs such as his /ɪz/ – here's /ɪːz/, merry /ˈmerɪj/ – Mary /ˈmeːrɪj/, at /æt/ – out /æːt/ and Polly /ˈpɔlɪj/ – poorly /ˈpɔːlɪj/ contrast mainly by length, though /ɔː/ may be slightly higher than /ɔ/.
- Disyllabic [ɪjə, ɛjə, ɔwə, æjə] realisations of /ɪː, eː, ɔː, æː/ are also possible, and at least [ɛjə, ɔwə, æjə] are regarded as very strongly Cockney. Among these, the triphthongal realisation of /ɔː/ occurs most commonly. There is not a complete agreement about the distribution of these; according to Wells (1982), they "occur in sentence-final position", whereas according to Mott (2012), these are "most common in final position".
- When diphthongal, /ɪː/ and /eː/ have higher starting points than in RP: [iə̯, e̞ə̯]. However, Beaken considers the former to be unshifted in comparison with traditional RP: [ɪə̯].

Other vowel differences include:

- /æ/ may be [ɛ] or [ɛj], with the latter occurring before voiced consonants, particularly before /d/: [bɛk] "back", [bɛːjd] "bad"
- /e/ may be [eə̯], [ej], or [ɛj] before certain voiced consonants, particularly before /d/: [bejd] "bed"
- According to Wells, /ɔ/ may be somewhat less open than RP /ɒ/, that is [ɔ]. Beaken, on the other hand, considers variants no more open than [ɔ] to be the norm: [kʰɔʔ] "cot"
- /ɑː/ has a fully back variant, qualitatively equivalent to cardinal 5, which Beaken (1971) claims characterizes "vigorous, informal" Cockney.
- /əː/ is on occasion somewhat fronted and lightly rounded, giving Cockney variants such as [ə̟ː], [œ̝̈ː].
- /a/ is realised as [ɐ̟] or a quality like that of cardinal 4, [a]: [dʒamʔˈtˢapʰ] "jumped up"
- /ɔw/ is realised as [oː] or a closing diphthong of the type [ɔw~ow] when in non-final position, with the latter variants being more common in broad Cockney: [sɔws] "sauce"-"source", [lɔwd] "laud"-"lord", [ˈwɔwʔə] "water."
- /ɔː/ is realised as [ɔː] or a centering diphthong/triphthong of the type [ɔə~ɔwə] when in final position, with the latter variants being more common in broad Cockney; thus [sɔə] "saw"-"sore"-"soar", [lɔə] "law"-"lore", [wɔə] "war"-"wore". The diphthong is retained before inflectional endings, so that board /bɔwd/ and pause /pɔwz/ contrast with bored /bɔːd/ and paws /pɔːz/. [ɔə] has a somewhat tenser onset than the cardinal [ɔ], that is [ɔ̝ə].
- /əw/ becomes something around [ɒw~ɔw] or even [aɰ] in broad Cockney before dark l. These variants are retained when the addition of a suffix turns the dark l clear. Thus a phonemic split has occurred in London English, exemplified by the minimal pair wholly /ˈɒwlɪj/ vs. holy /ˈəwlɪj/. The development of L-vocalisation (see next section) leads to further pairs such as sole-soul [sɒw] vs. so-sew [sɐɰ], bowl [bɒw] vs. Bow [bɐɰ], shoulder [ˈʃɒwdə] vs. odour [ˈɐɰdə], while associated vowel neutralisations may make doll a homophone of dole, compare dough [dɐɰ]. All this reinforces the phonemic nature of the opposition and increases its functional load. It is now well-established in all kinds of London-flavoured accents, from broad Cockney to near-RP.
- /ʊ/ in some words (particularly good) is central [ʊ̈]. In other cases, it is near-close near-back [ʊ], as in traditional RP.

The dialect uses the vocalisation of dark L, hence [ˈmɪwwɔw] for Millwall. The actual realisation of a vocalised /l/ is influenced by surrounding vowels, and it may be realised as [u], [ʊ], [o] or [ɤ]. It is also transcribed as a semivowel [w] by some linguists, e.g., Coggle and Rosewarne. However, according to Ladefoged & Maddieson (1996), the vocalised dark l is sometimes an unoccluded lateral approximant, which differs from the RP [ɫ] only by the lack of the alveolar contact. Relatedly, there are many possible vowel neutralisations and absorptions in the context of a following dark L ([ɫ]) or its vocalised version; these include:

- In broad Cockney, and to some extent in general popular London speech, a vocalised /l/ is entirely absorbed by a preceding /ɔw/: e.g., salt and sort become homophones (although the contemporary pronunciation of salt /sɔlt/ would prevent this from happening), and likewise fault-fought-fort, pause-Paul's, Morden-Malden, water-Walter. Sometimes such pairs are kept apart, in a more deliberate speech at least, by a kind of length difference: [ˈmɔwdn̩] Morden vs. [ˈmɔwːdn̩] Malden.
- A preceding /ə/ is also fully absorbed into vocalised /l/. The reflexes of earlier /əl/ and earlier /ɔw(l)/ are thus phonetically similar or identical; speakers are usually ready to treat them as the same phoneme. Thus awful can best be regarded as containing two occurrences of the same vowel, /ˈɔwfɔw/. The difference between musical and music-hall, in an H-dropping broad Cockney, is thus nothing more than a matter of stress and perhaps syllable boundaries.
- With the remaining vowels, a vocalised /l/ is not absorbed but remains phonetically present as a back vocoid in such a way that /Vl/ and /V/ are kept distinct.
- The clearest and best-established neutralisations are those of /ɪ~ɪj~ɪː/ and /ʊ~ʉw/. Thus rill, reel and real fall together in Cockney as [ɹɪɰ]; while full and fool are [fow~fʊw] and may rhyme with cruel [ˈkʰɹʊw]. Before clear (i.e., prevocalic) /l/ the neutralisations do not usually apply, thus [ˈsɪlɪj] silly but [ˈsɪjlɪn] ceiling-sealing, [ˈfʊlɪj] fully but [ˈfʉwlɪn] fooling.
- In some broader types of Cockney, the neutralisation of /ʊ~ʉw/ before non-prevocalic /l/ may also involve /ɔw/, so that fall becomes homophonous with full and fool [fɔw].
- The other pre-/l/ neutralisation which all investigators agree on is that of /æ~æj~æː/. Thus, Sal and sale can be merged as [sæɰ], fail and fowl as [fæɰ], and Val, vale-veil and vowel as [væɰ]. The typical pronunciation of railway is [ˈɹæwwæj].
- According to Siversten, /ɑː/ and /ɑj/ can also join in this neutralisation. They may, on the one hand, neutralize concerning one another so that snarl and smile rhyme, both ending [-ɑɰ], and Child's Hill is in danger of being mistaken for Charles Hill; or they may go further into a fivefold neutralisation with the one just mentioned, so that pal, pale, foul, snarl and pile all end in [-æɰ]. But these developments are restricted to broad Cockney, not being found in London speech in general.
- A neutralisation discussed by Beaken (1971) and Bowyer (1973), but ignored by Siversten (1960), is that of /ɔ~ɔw~a/. It leads to the possibility of doll, dole and dull becoming homophonous as [dɒw] or [da̠ɰ]. Wells' impression is that the doll-dole neutralisation is rather widespread in London, but that involving dull less so.
- One further possible neutralisation in the environment of a following non-prevocalic /l/ is that of /e/ and /əː/, so that well and whirl become homophonous as [wɛw].

Cockney has been occasionally described as replacing /ɹ/ with /w/, for example, thwee (or fwee) instead of three, fwasty instead of frosty. Peter Wright, a Survey of English Dialects fieldworker, concluded that this was not a universal feature of Cockneys but that it was more common to hear this in the London area than elsewhere in Britain. This description may also be a result of mishearing the labiodental R as /w/, when it is still a distinct phoneme in Cockney.

An unstressed final -ow may be pronounced [ə]. In broad Cockney, this can be lowered to [ɐ]. This is common to most traditional, Southern English dialects except for those in the West Country.

=== Grammar ===
Regarding grammar, Cockney uses me instead of my, for example, "'At's me book you got 'ere" [ˈæʔs mɪ ˈbʊk jə ˈɡɔʔ eː]. (where ''ere' means 'there'). It cannot be used when "my" is emphasised; e.g., "'At's my book you got 'ere" [æʔs ˈmɑj ˈbʊk jə ˈɡɔʔ eː]. It also uses the term ain't, as well as double negatives, for example, "I didn't see nuffink".

== Perception ==
The Cockney accent has long been regarded as an indicator of low status, but also carries other social connotations. For example, in 1909 the Conference on the Teaching of English in London Elementary Schools issued by the London County Council, stating that "the Cockney mode of speech, with its unpleasant twang, is a modern corruption without legitimate credentials, and is unworthy of being the speech of any person in the capital city of the Empire". Others defended the language variety: "The London dialect is really, especially on the South side of the Thames, a perfectly legitimate and responsible child of the old Kentish tongue [...] the dialect of London North of the Thames has been shown to be one of the many varieties of the Midland or Mercian dialect, flavoured by the East Anglian variety of the same speech". Since then, the Cockney accent has been more accepted as a form of the English language outside more mainstream dialects, rather than a lesser one, though the low-status or low-class mark remains.

In the 1950s, the only accent to be heard on the BBC (except in entertainment programs such as The Sooty Show) was the British standard, RP, whereas nowadays many different accents, including Cockney, or accents heavily influenced by it, can be heard on the BBC. The Cockney accent often featured in films produced by Ealing Studios and was frequently portrayed as the typical British accent of the lower classes in movies by Walt Disney, though this was only so in London.

== See also ==
- Cockney Wanker
- EastEnders
- Estuary English
- Languages of the United Kingdom
- List of British regional nicknames
- Madras Bashai and Bambaiya Hindi, similar working class dialects of Tamil and Hindi respectively used in the cities of Chennai and Mumbai, India
- London slang
- Mockney
- Possessive me
- Cockney rhyming slang

== Bibliography ==
- Beaken, Michael Alan (1971). A study of phonological development in a primary school population of East London (PDF) (Doctoral thesis). UCL.
- Cruttenden, A. (2001). Gimson's Pronunciation of English (6th ed.). London: Arnold.
- Ellis, Alexander J. (1890). English dialects: Their Sounds and Homes.
- Hughes, Arthur; Trudgill, Peter (1979). English Accents and Dialects: An Introduction to Social and Regional Varieties of British English. Baltimore: University Park Press.
- Ladefoged, Peter; Maddieson, Ian (1996). The Sounds of the World's Languages. Oxford: Blackwell. ISBN 0-631-19815-6.
- Matthews, William (1938). Cockney, Past and Present: a Short History of the Dialect of London. Detroit: Gale Research Company.
- Mott, Brian (2012), "Traditional Cockney and popular London speech", Dialectologia, 9, RACO (Revistes Catalanes amb Accés Obert): 69–94, ISSN 2013-2247
- Rogaliński, Paweł (2011). British Accents: Cockney, RP, Estuary English. ISBN 978-83-272-3282-3. "Łódź, Poland"
- Sivertsen, Eva (1960). Cockney Phonology. Oslo: University of Oslo.
- Wells, John C. (1982). Accents of English. Vol. 1: An Introduction (pp. i–xx, 1–278), Vol. 2: The British Isles (pp. i–xx, 279–466). Cambridge University Press. doi:10.1017/CBO9780511611759. ISBN 0-52129719-2, 0-52128540-2.
- Wright, Peter (1981). Cockney Dialect and Slang. London: B.T. Batsford Ltd.
- Cole, Amanda (4 November 2022). "Cockney moved East: the dialect of the first generation of East Londoners raised in Essex". Dialectologia et Geolinguistica. 30. De Gruyter Mouton: 91–114. doi:10.1515/dialect-2022-0005. S2CID 253258669.
