= Vidar Sandbeck =

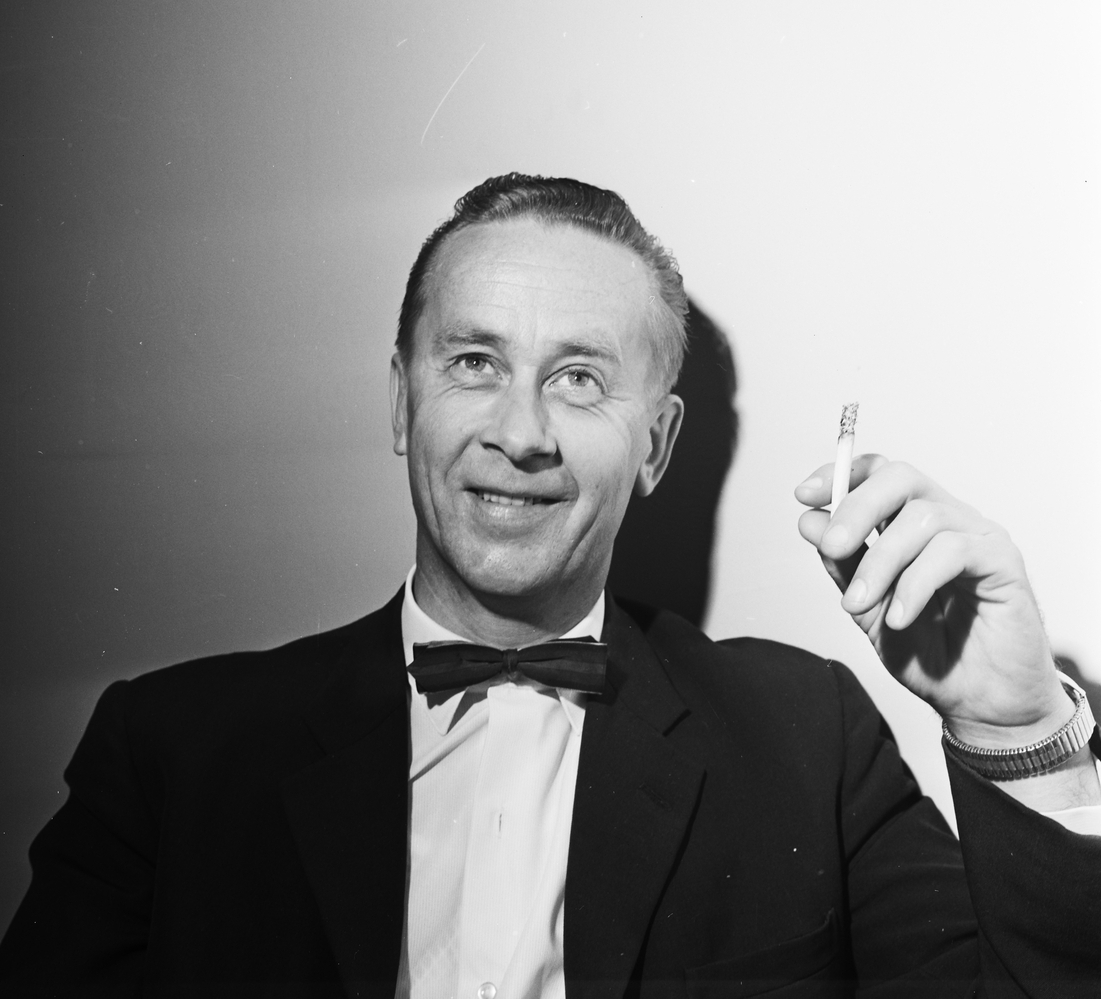
Vidar Sandbeck in 1964

Vidar Sandbeck (July 21, 1918 – November 10, 2005) was a Norwegian folk singer, composer, and writer.

Sandbeck was born in Åmot Municipality, in modest conditions, and suffered from poor health during much of his childhood. He became a prodigy on the violin at an early age and had his public debut in Stjørdal Municipality in 1941. He gave up a professional career as a violinist early on to make ends meet and provided himself with odd jobs in his home town.

He wrote poetry on the side and published his first collection in 1954. His creative efforts soon extended to include composition and performance of ballads, classical works, and books. He was also an accomplished wood carver. He told stories to children on radio. He won a number of awards and commendations.

Sandbeck published 40 books of various kinds. He died in his home town of Åmot, aged 87.

== Bibliography ==
- Anitras dans (Anitra's Dance) - 1983
- Far (Father) - 1984
- Fy skam deg! (Shame on You!) - 1977
- En handelsreisendes liv (The Life of a Travelling Merchant) - 1980
- Husbondens røst (The Voice of the Husband) - 1982
- Kanarifuglen - 1988.
- Kjærlighet og gråbensild - Cappelen - 1967
- Kjærtegn på vidvanke - 1970
- Langs bygdevegen - Dagfinn Grønoset og Vidar Sandbeck - 1960
- Månen lo over Ravneberget - 1964
- Rundtramper og flatfele - 1962
- Stakkars kroken - 1978
- Trøste oss! (Poor us!) - 1979
