= Paul Reine =

Norwegian politician

Paul Reine (14 November 1932 – 9 October 2009) was a Norwegian forester, civil servant and politician for the Conservative Party.

He grew up on the Gisletveit farm in Vegårshei Municipality. After graduation from the Norwegian College of Agriculture in 1960 he was a research assistant there until 1962, when he became municipal forest manager of Vegårshei Municipality and Tvedestrand Municipality. He advanced to county forest manager in 1972, county forest director in 1978, and director of the Norwegian Agriculture Agency from 1993 through 1997.

He also chaired the Norwegian Forestry Society from 1987 to 1990, having been a board member since 1984. He also chaired Skogbrukets Kursinstitutt and the insurance company Skogbrand.

Reine served three terms as mayor of Vegårshei, and one term as a member of Aust-Agder county council. He served as a deputy representative to the Parliament of Norway from Aust-Agder during the terms 1981–1985 and 1985–1989. In total he met during 3 days of parliamentary sessions.

He was decorated with the King's Medal of Merit in gold.
