= Elisabeth Aasen =

Norwegian politician (1922–2009)

Deputy Representative of the Storting
- In office 1973–1977
- Constituency: Møre og Romsdal

Personal details
- Born: 9 February 1922
- Died: 12 November 2009 (aged 87)
- Political party: Socialist Electoral League

Elisabeth Aasen (9 February 1922 – 12 November 2009) was a Norwegian politician for the Socialist Electoral League.

She served as a deputy representative to the Parliament of Norway from Møre og Romsdal during the term 1973–1977. In total she met during 13 days of parliamentary session.
