= Marit Trætteberg =

Norwegian chemist (1930–2009)

Marit Trætteberg, née Krogstad (28 September 1930 – 27 October 2009) was a Norwegian chemist.

She was born in Ålesund. She graduated from the Norwegian Institute of Technology with the siv.ing. degree in 1954, and was hired as a lecturer in 1962. In 1969 she was promoted to docent, and in 1970 she took the dr.philos. degree. She was promoted to professor in 1974. From 1992 to 1994 she was the prorector of the University of Trondheim. She died in October 2009 in Trondheim.

She was a fellow of the Norwegian Academy of Science and Letters, the Royal Norwegian Society of Sciences and Letters and the Norwegian Academy of Technological Sciences. She was a board member of NAVF from 1972 to 1978.
