= Ole Johannes Kløv =

Norwegian trade unionist and politician

Ole Johannes Kløv (12 March 1925 – 9 July 2009) was a Norwegian trade unionist and politician for the Labour Party.

He was born in Tønsberg as a son of seaman Hjalmar Kløv (1899–1973) and housewife Konstanse Johanson (1901–1989). He spent his entire working career, from 1943 to 1990, as a welder at Kaldnes Mekaniske Verksted. He chaired his local trade union from 1953 to 1957 and 1966 to 1970, was a member of the company's corporate council, and was a national board member of the Norwegian Union of Iron and Metalworkers from 1968 to 1984 and a board member of Tønsberg og omland faglige samorg. He held several public posts, including the period as chairman of the Norwegian Labour Inspection Authority from 1976 to 1979.

He chaired his local party chapter in 1961 and from 1973 to 1977. He was a member of the municipal council of Nøtterøy Municipality from 1975 to 1983. He served as a deputy representative to the Parliament of Norway from Vestfold during the terms 1969–1973, 1973–1977 and 1977–1981. In total he met during 1 year and 10 days of parliamentary session. In 2000 he received honorary membership in the Labour Party.
