= Ernst Magne Johansen =

Norwegian painter and printmaker (1926–2009)

Ernst Magne Johansen (2 April 1926 – 28 August 2009) was a Norwegian painter and printmaker.

He was born in Nøtterøy Municipality and was educated at the Norwegian National Academy of Craft and Art Industry from 1945 to 1949 and the Norwegian National Academy of Fine Arts from 1949 to 1952. He was a faculty member at the Norwegian National Academy of Fine Arts from 1963 to 1992.

He exhibited at the Autumn Exhibition in Oslo 19 times, and abroad in Sweden, Italy, Iceland, Finland, France, Denmark, the US, England, Germany and Poland. His works are owned by the National Gallery of Norway, Victoria and Albert Museum, National Gallery of Denmark, Riksgalleriet and the Arts Council Norway among others. Among his public decorations are Vinderen School (1950), Kalnes Agricultural School (1959) and Oslo Arbeidersamfunn (1966).
