= Gerd Vollum =

Norwegian politician

Gerd Vollum (18 July 1920 – 1 July 2009) was a Norwegian politician for the Labour Party.

She served as a deputy representative to the Parliament of Norway from Akershus during the term 1973–1977. In total she met during 40 days of parliamentary session.
