= InFiber =

Norwegian telecommunications company

InFiber AS
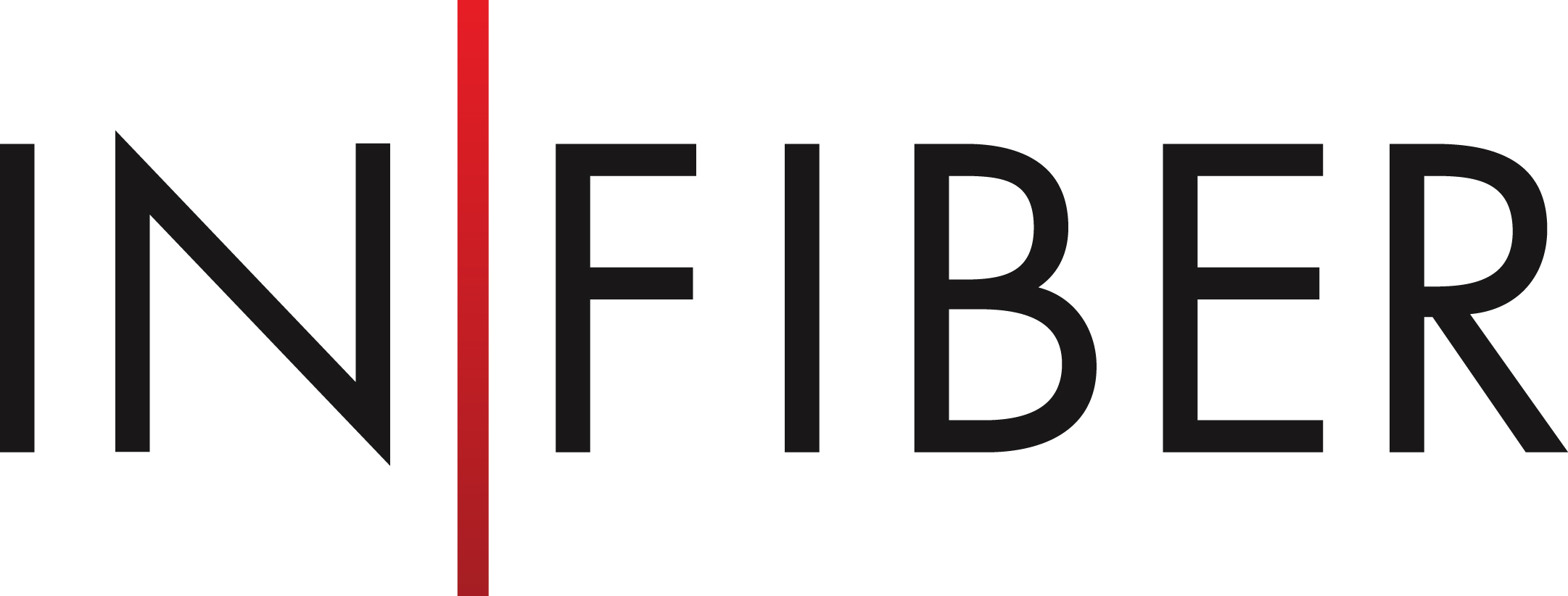
- Type: Aksjeselskap
- Industry: Telecommunication
- Founded: 2009
- Headquarters: Oslo, Norway
- Area served: Norway
- Key people: Ole Edvard Pedersen (CEO)
- Products: Dark fiber
- Revenue: NOK 180 million (2010)
- Operating income: NOK 170 million (2010)
- Net income: NOK 88 million (2010)
- Total assets: NOK 578 million (2010)
- Number of employees: 21 (2011)
- Parent: EQT V
- Website: www.infiber.no

InFiber AS is a Norwegian telecommunication company that specialize in provision of dark fiber.

The company owns a fiber optic network of more than 2000 route km in the Oslo region in Norway.

Until 2011, InFiber was called Hafslund Fibernett and was a part of the Hafslund Group. Hafslund sold the company to the private equity fund EQT V in December 2010 at an enterprise value of NOK 1477 million.
