= Inger Johanne Nossum =

Norwegian academic (1930–2009)

Inger Johanne Nossum (21 May 1930 – 29 August 2009) was a Norwegian academic.

She was born in Chudenberg, and took her first higher education at Levanger Teacher's College. She graduated in 1951, and later took further education. In 1978 she took the cand.ped. degree. In 1963 she was hired at the Norwegian State College for Domestic Science Teachers, eventually being promoted to associate professor. The State College for Domestic Science Teachers became a part of Akershus University College through a 1994 merger, and Nossum served as the first rector from 1994 to 1997. She was a co-founder of the Norwegian branch of the International Federation for Home Economics.

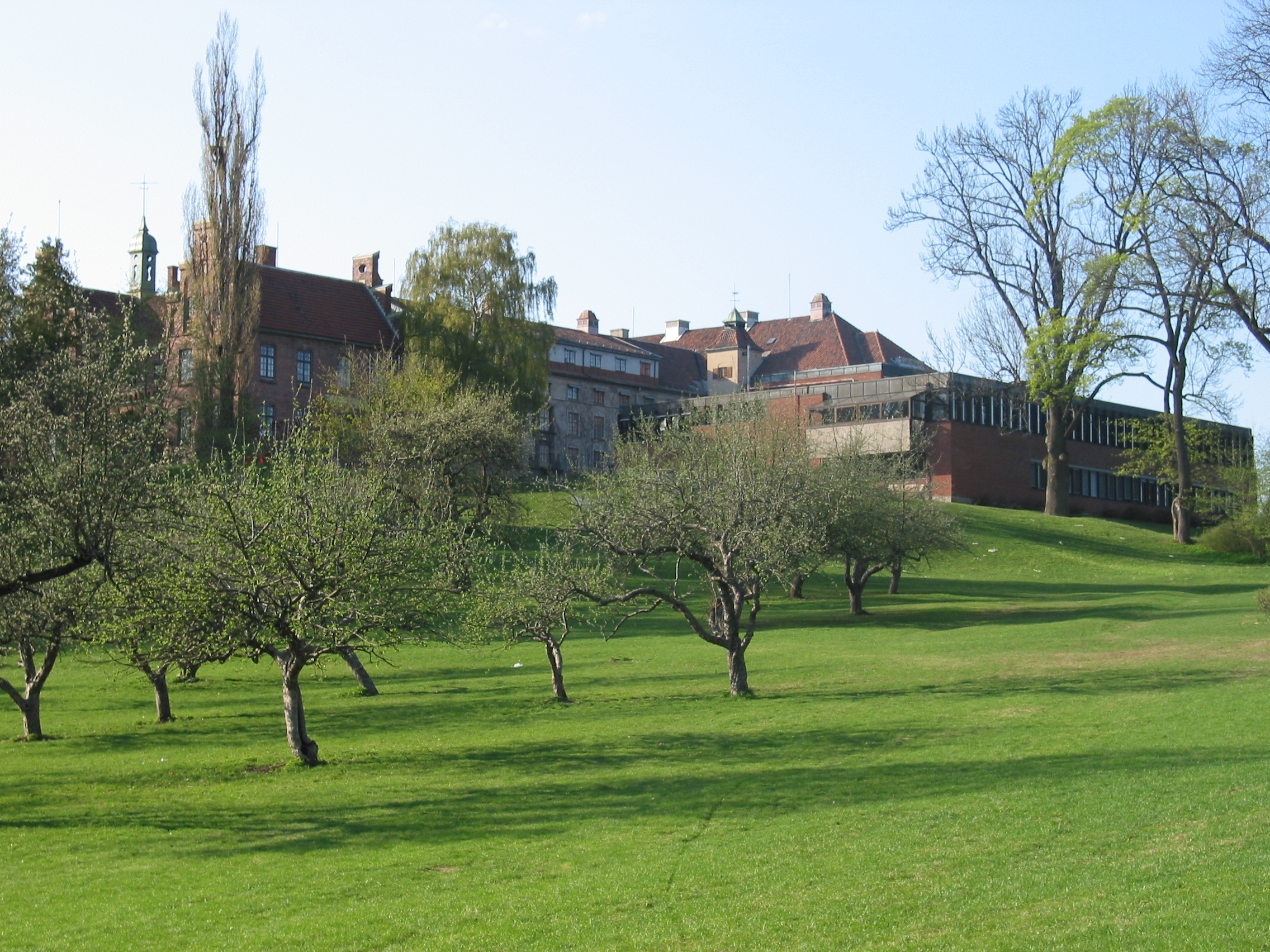
The property which Nossum worked to preserve.

Nossum lived at Bekkestua. In 2005 she became leader of the organization Høyskoletomtens venner, which worked to preserve the State College for Domestic Science Teachers property. She died in August 2009 after short-term illness.

Academic offices
Preceded by position created	Rector of Akershus University College; 1994–1997	Succeeded by Nina Tollefsen
