= Eva Sivertsen =

Norwegian linguist (1922 – 2009)

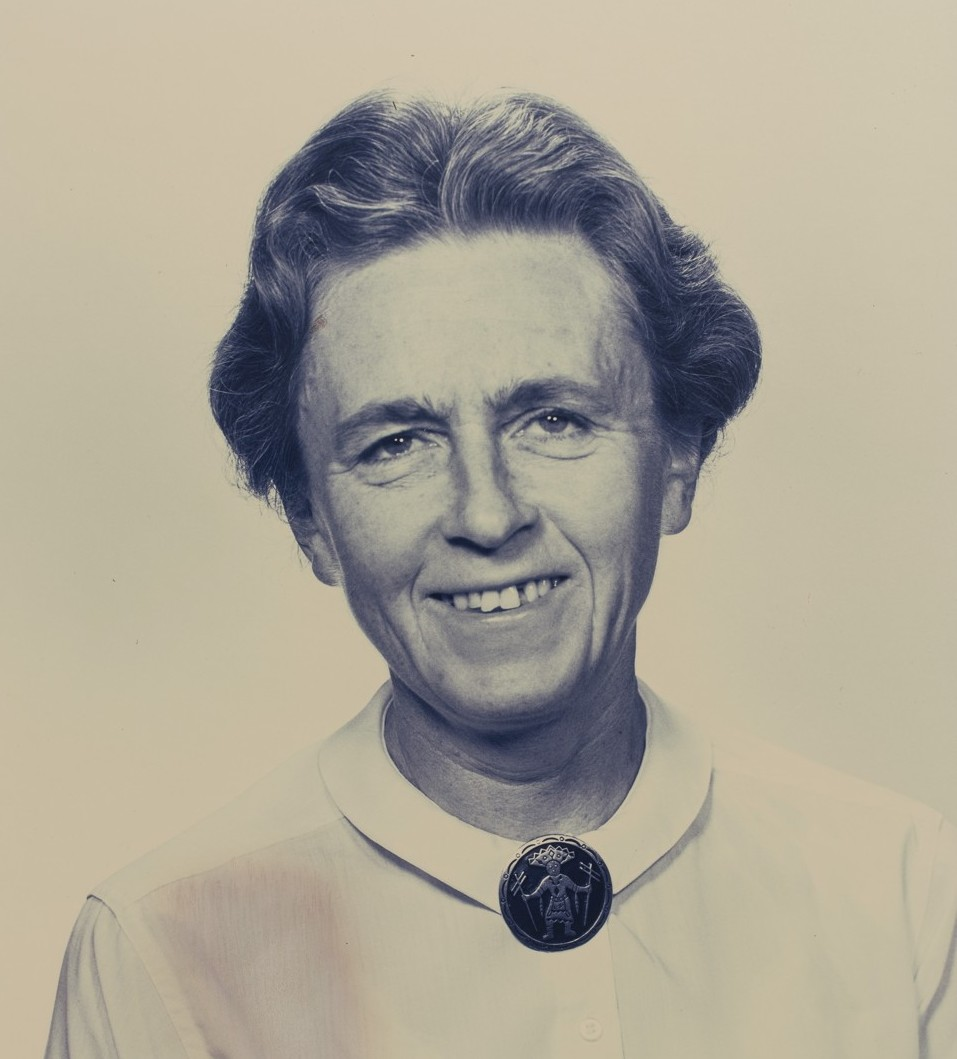
Eva Sivertsen

Eva Sivertsen (8 July 1922 – 22 November 2009) was a Norwegian linguist. She was known for her work on the Cockney dialect of the London working class, which was “one of the first investigations of an urban dialect in Britain.” In 1961 she became the first female professor of English linguistics in Norway.

== Biography ==
Born on 8 July 1922 in Trondhjem, Sør-Trøndelag, Norway, Eva Sivertsen was the daughter of John Ludvig Sivertsen (1879–1970) and Ragna Oline Moe (1891–1992). She enrolled at the department of English in the University of Oslo in 1943. In addition she did a postgraduate diploma in phonetics at the department of phonetics, in the University College London, where she conducted the field study for her doctoral thesis on Cockney, an accent and dialect of English, mainly spoken by working-class and lower middle-class Londoners, in Bethnal Green. She later completed her doctoral thesis from the University of Oslo. She also had study stay in Michigan, USA. Her work on Cockney has been criticised by K.M. Petyt for offering a description of a dialect spoken by millions based on a sample of just four elderly women.

In 1957 she started her teaching career as a lecture at the department of English in the University of Oslo. Between 1961 and 1992, she served as the professor of English linguistics at the Norwegian College of General Sciences, earlier known as the Norwegian Teachers' College, which was part of the University of Trondheim. For a period of 15 years, she headed the department of English at Trondheim University. She also served as a rector of the University of Trondheim from 1975 to 1981. She was the secretary of the Eighth International Congress of Linguists, held in Oslo in 1957 and edited its proceedings.

She was influenced by the works of Charles F. Hockett, a noted American linguist. She also worked with renowned scholars like Gordon R. Peterson and Kenneth L. Pike during her stay in abroad. Her works on phonetics and phonology were published by the Oslo University Press as Cockney Phonology in 1960.

She was the member of the Royal Norwegian Society of Sciences and Letters, a Norwegian learned society based in Trondheim. She was also associated with the Norsk Tipping and the Norwegian Lottery Association. She held several administrative responsibilities in a number of professional organizations including the Norwegian Adult Education institute, the Norwegian UNESCO Committee, the Research Council for the Norwegian School Board and the Council for Humanistic Research.

She was awarded an honorary doctorate from the University of Strathclyde in 1980. To recognize her distinguished services, she was conferred the Royal Norwegian Order of Saint Olav in 1982.

She died in Trondheim on 22 November 2009.
