= Leif Eriksen (footballer, born 1909) =

Norwegian footballer

Personal information
- Full name: Leif Magnus Eriksen
- Date of birth: 4 June 1909
- Place of birth: Bergen, Norway
- Date of death: 3 February 1970 (aged 60)
- Position: Midfielder

International career
Years	Team	Apps	(Gls)
1935	Norway	1	(0)

Leif Eriksen (4 June 1909 – 3 February 1970) was a Norwegian footballer. He played in one match for the Norway national football team in 1935.
