= Kåre Karlsen =

Norwegian politician

Kåre Karlsen (9 September 1930 – 4 September 2009) was a Norwegian politician for the Centre Party.

He served as a deputy representative to the Parliament of Norway from Troms during the term 1973–1977. In total he met during 11 days of parliamentary session.
