= Wilhelm Elsrud =

Norwegian forester

Wilhelm Fredrik Selmer Elsrud (3 June 1921 – 29 October 2009) was a Norwegian forester.

He was born in Ådal. He is best known as executive director of the Norwegian Forestry Society from 1963 to 1986. He was also an honorary member of 4-H in Norway since 1974. He died in October 2009 in Oslo.
