= Christian Petersen (ice hockey) =

Norwegian ice hockey player

Personal information
- Born: 21 December 1937 Oslo, Norway
- Died: 17 September 2009 (aged 71)

Sport
- Sport: Ice hockey

Hans Christian Engelbreth Petersen (21 December 1937 – 17 September 2009) was a Norwegian ice hockey player, born in Oslo. He played for the Norwegian national ice hockey team, and participated at the Winter Olympics in 1964 and in 1968.
