= Oddvar Korme =

Norwegian journalist

Oddvar Korme (1925 – 3 August 2009) was a Norwegian journalist.

He studied philology and was hired as an Oslo correspondent for Bergens Tidende in 1947. In 1948 he was hired in the newspaper Norges Handels- og Sjøfartstidende (now: Dagens Næringsliv). He was promoted to editor in 1970, and retired in 1992. He successively worked with the many editors-in-chief during his time: Eivind Thon, Terje Baalsrud, Helge Seip, Arne Hartmark, Eric Cameron, Jan Erik Knarbakk and Kåre Valebrokk.

His main fields of writing were travelling, film criticism and theatre criticism. He was also active in the Norwegian branch of PEN. He died in August 2009.
