= Ragnvald Høier =

Norwegian physicist

Ragnvald Karl Olav Høier (30 November 1938 – 23 October 2009) was a Norwegian physicist.

He graduated from the University of Oslo with the cand.real. degree in 1965, and took the dr.philos. degree in 1973. He was appointed as professor at the Norwegian Institute of Technology (later known as Norwegian University of Science and Technology) in 1983. He was also involved at SINTEF.
