= Brynjulf Alver =

Brynjulf Alver (born Kristiansand 28 September 1924, died 21 February 2009) was a professor at the Etno-folkloristisk institutt (Institute of Ethno-Folklore) at the University of Bergen.

== Life ==
Alver grew up in Alversund. He obtained his master's degree in folkloristics in Oslo in 1951, and was connected to the University of Oslo as archivist and university lecturer from 1962 to 1971. He was also director of the Nordiska institutet för folkdiktning (Nordic Institute for Folk Poetry) 1968–69. In 1972, Alver became head of the newly established Etno-folkloristisk institutt at the University of Bergen, first as a docent in ethnology and folkloristics, then from 1983 as professor in folklore. Alver was known as an outstanding popularizer and lively debater with extensive professional insight. In 1994 he was the honorand of a Festschrift.

== Key works ==
- Historiske segner og historisk sanning (pp. 89–116). Norveg. Folkelivsgransking 9. Oslo 1962. (Translated into Swedish in Bengt af Klintberg (ed): Tro, sanning, sägen. Tre bidrag till en folkloristisk metodik i urval och med inledning. Bokförlaget PAN/Norstedts. Stockholm 1973.)
- Norsk eventyrbibliotek 1–12, ed. by Brynjulf Alver, Olav Bø, Reimund Kvideland, Mortan Nolsøe. Oslo 1967–1981.
- Dag og Merke. Folkeleg tidsrekning og merkedagstradisjon. Universitetsforlaget. Oslo 1970.
- Draumkvedet. Folkevise eller lærd kopidikting. Universitetsforlaget. Oslo 1971.
- Folkloristikk. Vitskapen om tradisjonen og samfunnet. Syn og segn (pp. 90–101). Oslo 1974.
- Lilja bære blomster i enge: folkeminneoppskrifter frå Telemark i 1840-50-åra / Olea Crøger, ed. by Brynjulf Alver, Reimund Kvideland and Astrid Nora Ressem.. Norsk Folkeminnelags skrifter nr. 112. Oslo 2004. ISBN 82-03-19015-4
