= Erik Naggum =

Norwegian computer programmer

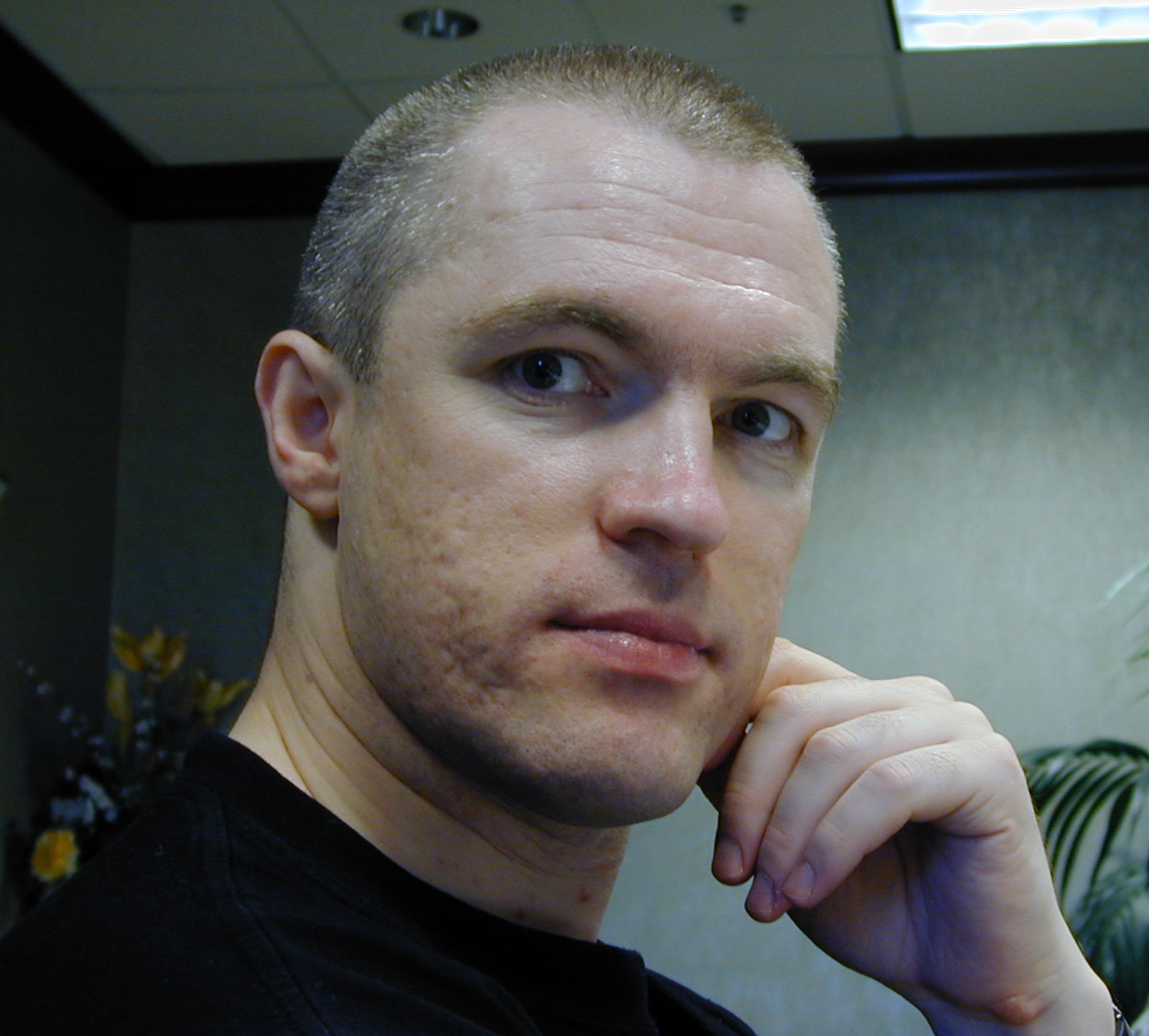
- Born: June 13, 1965
- Died: June 17, 2009 (aged 44)

Erik Naggum (June 13, 1965 – June 17, 2009) was a Norwegian computer programmer recognized for his work in the fields of SGML, Emacs and Lisp. Since the early 1990s he was also a provocative participant on various Usenet discussion groups.

Naggum made significant contributions to RFC 1123, which defines and discusses the requirements for Internet host software, and RFC 2049, which defines electronic information transfer of various binary formats through e-mail.

In a 1999 newspaper article in Dagbladet, he was interviewed about his aggressive, confrontational participation in Usenet discussion groups. Erik later stated his motto to be: "Some people are little more than herd animals, flocking together whenever the world becomes uncomfortable ... I am not one of those people. If I had a motto, it would probably be Herd thither, me hither."

His death on June 17, 2009 (aged 44), was caused by a massive bleeding ulcer, related to ulcerative colitis, which he was diagnosed with about 15 years before his death.

== Works ==
=== SGML ===
Naggum was Chairman of the SGML SIGhyper, the SGML special interest group on hypertext and multimedia (see HyTime). His technical commentary on ISO 8879:1986 in the archives of comp.text.sgml, in terms of both high quality and sheer mass, was especially appreciated.

=== Lisp ===
The Long, Painful History of Time, an article in which Naggum describes how the concept of universal time and time zones can be handled well in Lisp code.

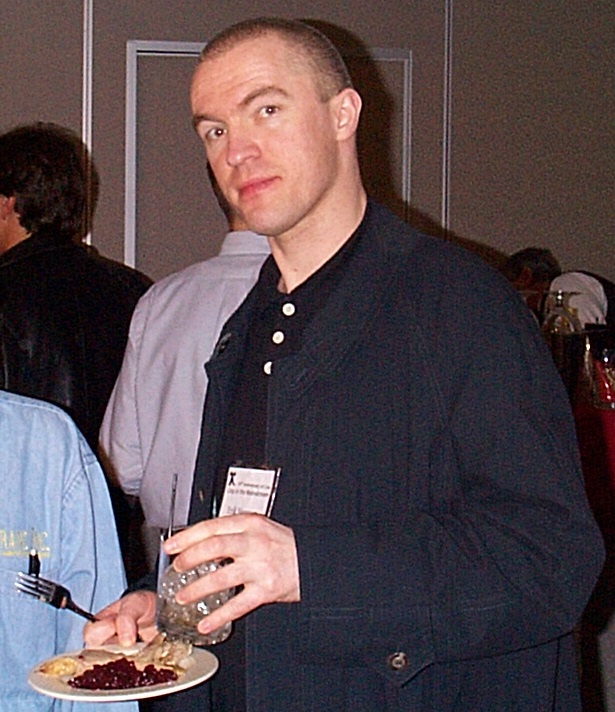
Naggum in Berkeley, CA, 1998

=== Usenet ===
Erik contributed an enormous number of postings to Usenet. 14,300 of them are "on record", but in many cases Erik used the "X-No-Archive" header when posting, a parameter requesting services like Google Groups not to archive the message.

=== Activism ===
In 1995, Erik started a journalism watch-group project on the web, campaigning to get a journalist sacked from Aftenposten following the publication of a sensationalist story about how Internet Relay Chat channels were used to trade child pornography.

=== Emacs ===
Erik Naggum contributed to the free software project Emacs text editor for almost a decade.

=== Standardization work ===
==== IEEE ====
Working group member of the POSIX.1-2008 / IEEE Std 1003.1-2008 and The Open Group Technical Standard Base Specifications, Issue 7.

==== IETF ====
Erik is listed as a major contributor in RFC 1123. Contributed to the requirement that Internet mail should include the four-digit representation of years, and thus avoid Y2K issues.

== Controversy ==
Erik Naggum was highly controversial. When he was passionate about something, which he was on many subjects, he eagerly and often harshly argued for his point of view. An example of this is his rant about XML being misdesigned and, especially, misused. One such example would be the diatribe against Martin Bryan posted in 1992. Erik Naggum hated Perl with a passion, and considered Perl to be a problem, not a problem solver. He disliked C++, though not as much as he hated Perl, but he generally thought that C++ was too difficult to understand to such a degree that only about 5 people on the planet truly understood it and hence it was of little value for humanity.

Erik Naggum several times stated that stupidity, or rather the lack of willingness of individuals to acquire knowledge about a subject, argument or read other people's arguments with an open mind, was more or less a criminal offense. He was known for his polemic aggression towards what he considered to be ignorant individuals. Much of what he wrote was so full of sarcasm and irony that it could be difficult to understand what he truly believed in and what were general exaggerations made just to make a point.
