= Karl Erik Zachariassen =

Norwegian entomologist

Karl Erik Zachariassen (1942 – 11 December 2009) was a Norwegian entomologist.

After taking his cand.real. degree at the University of Oslo with a thesis within zoophysiology, he studied further at the University of California, San Diego and took the dr.philos. degree in 1980. His doctoral thesis was titled Mechanisms Involved in Tolerance to Freezing in Adult Beetles. He became professor at the Norwegian Institute of Technology in 1988, later the Norwegian University of Science and Technology.

He furthermore chaired the Norwegian Entomological Society for fourteen years, was a fellow of the Norwegian Academy of Science and Letters and the Royal Norwegian Society of Sciences and Letters. He resided in Soknedal, and died in 2009.
