= Rolf Brahde =

Norwegian astronomer (1918–2009)

Carl Rolf Brahde (15 March 1918 – 25 May 2009) was a Norwegian astronomer.

He was born in Tvedestrand as Carl Rolf Henriksen. He was the son of teacher Bredo Henriksen (1888–1974) and Edna Lucy Brahde Davidsen (1891–1967). He changed his last name to Brahde in 1933. He finished his secondary education in Skien in 1937, and enrolled at the University of Oslo in the same year. His studies were interrupted by World War II. He fought in the Norwegian Campaign in 1940, and during the subsequent German occupation of Norway he was a member of the clandestine resistance group XU. He was eventually discovered, but fled to Sweden in 1944. He was decorated with the Defence Medal 1940 – 1945. He continued his studies in Stockholm, and was an assistant for Bertil Lindblad at Stockholm Observatory from 1944 to 1946. He then returned to Norway and graduated with the cand.real. degree. He was married to Luisa Aall Barricelli, a daughter of Marna Aall and professor Maurizio Barricelli, from 1948 to 1961. Brahde married stenographer Elsie Unn Axelsen in 1963.

Already one year after graduating, in 1948, Brahde was hired as observer at the University of Oslo. In this position, he was responsible for the construction of Harestua Solar Observatory north of Oslo. He lectured in celestial mechanics and spherical astronomy, and also researched optics related to astronomical instruments as well as calculating the tidal force and the lunar eclipse. He pioneered the use of computers in astronomy in Norway. He also published popular science books and articles, he was a common guest in radio and television programmes and provided commentary for the Norwegian Broadcasting Corporation during the television coverage of the Apollo 11 Moon landing. He was promoted to professor in 1987, but retired when reaching the age limit of 70 in 1988. He was a professor emeritus for the rest of his life. He continued doing the calculations for the official Norwegian almanac until 1991, having started in 1967. During this entire period the almanac was edited by Eberhart Jensen.

Brahde lived at Haslum. He died in May 2009.
