= Geir Hovig =

Norwegian radio host

Geir Johannes Hovig (18 September 1944 – 26 April 2009) was a Norwegian radio host.

Hovig was born in Namsos Municipality, Norway, and grew up in the neighboring Overhalla Municipality, Norway. He started his career as a journalist with the Associated Press and the Norwegian News Agency news agencies, and was later (in 1970) hired by the Norwegian Broadcasting Corporation. He was a news reader in Dagsnytt, and later had his own radio shows, including Kveldskjør, Eldorado and Hovigs Hangar. His shows featured a special emphasis on blues music.

He died on 26 April 2009, 64 years old.
