= Torstein Tranøy =

Norwegian journalist and writer

Torstein Tranøy (8. January 1964 – 7 September 2009) was a Norwegian journalist and writer.

He hailed from Trondheim. After starting his journalist career in the local Radio RV, he took journalist education in Oslo, and started working in Klassekampen. He headed the local trade union, and left in protest when editor-in-chief Paul Bjerke was removed in 1997. In 1998 he found work in the business newspaper Dagens Næringsliv, where he worked at the time of his death. His specialty in journalism was labour, trade unions and wage issues. In 2007 he released the book Vallas fall, about the scandal involving Gerd-Liv Valla and Ingunn Yssen.

Openly gay, Tranøy was elected leader of the gay rights organization Det Norske Forbundet av 1948 in 1991. He succeeded Kjell Erik Øie. The organization went defunct in 1992 as Norwegian National Association for Lesbian and Gay Liberation was established.

Tranøy died suddenly of epilepsy in September 2009.
