= Harold Nicolaisen =

Norwegian politician

Harold Nicolaisen (18 May 1929 – 29 December 2009) was a Norwegian politician for the Conservative Party.

He served as a deputy representative to the Parliament of Norway from Nordland during the term 1965–1969. In total he met during 12 days of parliamentary session.
