= Hildur Os =

Norwegian politician

Hildur Odlaug Os (19 March 1913 – 4 July 2009) was a Norwegian civil servant and politician for the Labour Party.

She was born in Eid Municipality as a daughter of builder and timber merchant Anders Karlsen (1871–1940) and Astrid Langeland (1879–1932). She attended Fjordane Folk High School from 1929 to 1930, and took numerous classes through postal correspondence. She spent most of her career as chief administrator of social affairs in Eid, from 1968 to 1983. She also chaired the local Noregs Ungdomslag chapter from 1936 to 1938 and the gymnastics department of Eid IL from 1952 to 1955.

She became involved in politics, and was a member of the municipal council of Eid Municipality from 1955 to 1964 and 1965 to 1964. She also served as a deputy representative to the Parliament of Norway from Sogn og Fjordane during the terms 1961–1965, 1965–1969, 1969–1973 and 1973–1977. In total she met during 193 days of parliamentary session.
