= Jone Vadla =

Norwegian politician

Jone Vadla (16 April 1923 – 4 April 2009) was a Norwegian agrarian leader and politician for the Centre Party.

He was born in Gjesdal Municipality. After finishing his secondary education in 1943 he graduated from the Norwegian College of Agriculture in 1948. He worked in the agricultural sector in Rogaland from 1948, and from 1969 to 1990 he was the chief executive of Felleskjøpet's branch in Rogaland and Agder. He edited the magazine Bondevennen between 1957 and 1959.

Vadla was elected to the municipal council of Hetland Municipality in 1964, then on the municipal council of Stavanger Municipality from 1965 to 1975. Between 1976 and 1983 he served two terms in Rogaland county council, then Stavanger city council again from 1995 to 1999. He was elected as a deputy representative to the Parliament of Norway from Rogaland for the term 1973–1977.

Vadla served as chairman of Jærmuseet from 1992, board member of Norske Felleskjøp from 1971 to 1990 and Statens korn- og kraftforråd from 1980 to 1986 and deputy member of the Broadcasting Council from 1983 to 1989. He received the King's Medal of Merit in gold in 1990 and died in 2009.

He should not be confused with sales director Jone Vadla (1928–2011).
