= Odd Kirkeby =

Norwegian politician

Odd Kirkeby (3 April 1925 – 26 December 2009) was a Norwegian politician for the Conservative Party.

He was born in Vang Municipality in Hedmark county, as a son of a shop owner. Following a mercantile education Odd Kirkeby was himself a shop owner his entire career. He entered politics after the Second World War and chaired the Young Conservatives in Hamar from 1946 to 1949, and for all of Hedmark county from 1950–52 and 1954–56. He quickly advanced to chairman of the Conservative Party in Hamar from 1950–52 and 1958–60, and also chair for the Hedmark county party from 1967 to 1971.

Kirkeby was an elected member of the executive committee of the municipal council for Hamar Municipality from 1955 to 1975 and also elected to the Hedmark county council from 1963 to 1991. He then embarked on three more terms in Hamar municipal council from 1991 to 2003. He served as a deputy representative to the Parliament of Norway from Hedmark during the terms 1961–1965, 1969–1973, and 1973–1977. In total he met during 152 days of parliamentary session.

Outside of politics, he was a board member of local energy companies from 1972 to 1999, with certain hiatuses. He died in 2009, aged 86.
