= Bjørn Lothe =

Norwegian politician

Bjørn Lothe (31 March 1952 – 30 April 2009) was a Norwegian politician for the Socialist Left Party.

He served as a deputy representative to the Parliament of Norway from Hordaland during the terms 1997–2001, 2001–2005 and 2005–2009. In total he met during 28 days of parliamentary session.
