= Ole Edvard Borgen =

Norwegian theologian

Ole Edvard Borgen (8 November 1925 – 24 March 2009) was a Norwegian theologian and Methodist bishop.

He was born in Lillestrøm as a son of meat merchant Omar Emil Borgen (1900–1985) and Harda Pytte (1901–1989), and older brother of Peder Borgen. In June 1949 he married Martha Olava Rygge (1928–2003).

He attended Tomb Agricultural School from 1944 to 1946, and also completed an apprenticeship in sausage making, intent to take over his father's store and the family farm. He was elected to Lillestrøm city council, serving from 1950 to 1956. Besides that, the entire family adhered to the Methodist creed, and in 1956 Borgen travelled to the United States to study different subjects. From 1959 to 1962 he was a choir leader and pastor for youths in Edgemont Baptist Church, Durham, and from 1963 he was a pastor at West Side Avenue Methodist Church in Jersey City. In 1968 he took his doctorate at Drew University with the thesis John Wesley on the Sacraments. A Theological Study.

He had then been stationed in Stockholm since 1966, as an aide to the Methodist bishop to the Nordic countries, Odd Hagen. After a spell as secretary at the Methodist World Council office in Geneva, Borgen served as the Methodist bishop to the Nordic countries from 1970 to 1989. He was a delegate to the World Council of Churches and became president of the Council of Methodist Bishops, as the first non-American. He rounded off his career as a professor of systematic theology at Asbury Theological Seminary from 1989 to 1992.

He died in March 2009 in Lørenskog.
