= Martha Schrøder =

Norwegian politician (1918–2009)

Martha Schrøder (11 September 1918 – 27 September 2009) was a Norwegian politician for the Conservative Party.

She was born in Kristiania as a daughter of Major Jon M. Dugstad (1890–1980) and Ellen Marie Marcussen (1895–1986). She finished commerce school in 1936, had courses in sewing, and stenography and attended the Norwegian State College for Domestic Science Teachers. She also stayed in England for periods. From 1939 to 1941 she was a secretary in Norges Økonomiske Selvhjelpsråd and Statens Gassgeneratornemd. During the Second World War, she stayed abroad. She was a stenographer in the Norwegian refugee office in Stockholm in 1941, and an assistant in the exiled Ministry of Provisioning (1941–1942) and Ministry of Shipping (1942–1945) in London. From 1943 she was a Corporal in the Norwegian Women's Corps.

After the war, she continued with some education and odd secretary jobs. She worked with development aid in the Ministry of Social Affairs from 1958 to 1960. She joined the Conservative Party in 1949 and was a member of the Oslo city council from 1955 to 1959, and from 1967 to 1971 in the executive committee. She served as a deputy representative to the Parliament of Norway from Oslo during the term 1961–1965. In total she met during 92 days of parliamentary session.

In Oslo she was a board member of several social institutions. She was also a board member of the Museum of Decorative Arts and Design from 1968 to 1981 and chairman from 1981 to 1988. From 1968 to 1971 she was, among others, a regional planning council member, a supervisory council member of Bærumsbanen, Ekebergbanen, and Oslo Sporveier, and a deputy board member of Oslo Kinematografer. She was a deputy board member of the European Movement in Norway from 1956 to 1971.

She then attended ergotherapy school in the 1970s and worked as such until 1978. From 1977 to 1987 she worked as a spinning wheel teacher.
