= Tollak B. Sirnes =

Norwegian physician (1922–2009)

- Born: 17 October 1922; Haugesund, Norway
- Died: 15 October 2009 (aged 86); Årstad
- Education: University of Oslo
- Scientific career
- Fields: Psychiatry; Pharmacology
- Workplaces: University of Bergen (professor 1963–1992)

Tollak Bakke Sirnes (17 October 1922 – 15 October 2009) was a Norwegian physician, psychiatrist and pharmacologist.

Sirnes was born in Haugesund, and had eleven siblings of whom ten were older. He finished his secondary education in Haugesund in 1942. He then enrolled at the University of Oslo. This was during World War II, and Sirnes was arrested by the German occupation force following the 28 November 1943 university fire in Oslo. Of a total of 1,166 students arrested, 644 were sent to Germany for "readjustment". Sirnes was imprisoned in Buchenwald and Neuengamme concentration camps, but survived and was released at the war's end.

He returned to Norway, graduated from the University of Oslo with the cand.med. degree in 1950 and worked as a research assistant until 1954. He also married in July 1950. In 1954 he took the dr.med. degree with the thesis Some Effects of Barbiturate Derivatives on the Function of the Mammalian Sceletal Muscle. He worked as a physician in Mandal from 1954 to 1955, at Ullevål Hospital from 1955 to 1958 and at Dikemark Hospital from 1958 to 1963. In 1962 he qualified as a specialist in psychiatry. He was appointed professor of pharmacology at the University of Bergen in 1963. He remained here until 1992, and was also chief physician at Haukeland Hospital from 1972 to 1979, dean from 1973 to 1975 and deputy rector in 1975. Sirnes edited Sinnets Helse from 1960 to 1962 and Acta Pharmacologica et Toxicologica Scandinavica from 1963 to 1981, and worked in the staff of Tidsskrift for Den norske lægeforening until 1985. Sirnes also contributed to popular science, and won a popular science award from NAVF in 1976. He was inspired by the philosophy of Søren Kierkegaard, and his Christian views marked his authorship.

He was decorated as a Knight, First Class of the Royal Norwegian Order of St. Olav in 1994. He lived in Årstad, Bergen, and died in his home in October 2009.
