= Odd Torgeir Rusten =

Norwegian politician

Odd Torgeir Rusten (27 February 1925 – 1 February 2009) was a Norwegian smallholder and politician for the Labour Party.

He was born in Tynset Municipality as a son of smallholder Magne Rusten (1901–1987) and homeworker Kjellfrid Øverby (1902–1935). He took agricultural school from 1947 to 1949 and was a smallholder at the family farm from 1952 to 1982, when his son took over. He chaired the county branch of the Norwegian Farmers and Smallholders Union from 1979 to 1986, having been a board member from 1974 to 1979 and chaired the local branch from 1957 to 1969. Public posts include the county board of agriculture from 1975 to 1991, being chairman for the last ten years. He was also a lay judge in Østerdal District Court.

He chaired his local Labour Party branch in Brydalen from 1972 to 1997. He was a member of the municipal council of Tynset Municipality from 1963 to 1965, 1967 to 1971 and 1975 to 1977. He was a member of Hedmark county council from 1983 to 1991, having been a deputy member from 1975 to 1983. He served as a deputy representative to the Parliament of Norway from Hedmark during the terms 1977–1981 and 1981–1985. From 1977 to February 1981 he met as a regular representative, covering for Odvar Nordli who was a member of Bratteli's Second Cabinet and Prime Minister in Nordli's Cabinet. Rusten was a member of the Standing Committee on Agriculture, and in total he met during 3 years and 210 days of parliamentary session.
