= Bjarne Karsten Vatne =

Norwegian politician (1926–2009)

Bjarne Karsten Vatne (11 October 1926 – 1 October 2009) was a Norwegian politician for the Labour Party.

He served as a deputy representative to the Parliament of Norway from Oslo during the term 1977–1981. In total he met during 16 days of parliamentary session.
