= Knut Eidem =

Norwegian writer

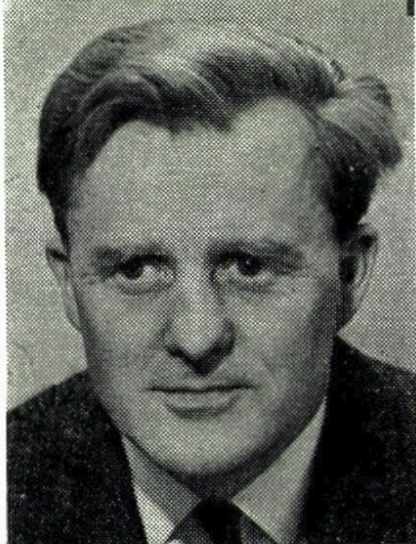
Norwegian writer Knut Eidem

Knut Eidem (24 December 1918 – 12 January 2009) was a Norwegian journalist and non-fiction writer.

He was a brother of Odd Eidem. While a student at the University of Oslo, Knut Eidem was among those rounded up following the 1943 University of Oslo fire, arrested and sent to Sennheim concentration camp. He remained incarcerated here until the camp was liberated.

As a writer he published a book about the fire, Aulaen brenner (1980), and also the commercial success Rui-jentene som kom til Kongen (1974), then Se deg i speilet (1975), Før vi vandrer (1981) and Cato (1983, about Cato Zahl Pedersen). His journalist career was spent in Dagbladet from 1950 to 1990. He died in January 2009.
