= Birger Skeie =

Norwegian businessman

Birger Skeie (1951 – 26 August 2009) was a male Norwegian businessperson. He was known as CEO of National Oilwell Varco in Norway and chairman of TTS Marine.

== Career ==
He was born in Eiken Municipality, but later moved to Kristiansand. He was a second cousin of Bjarne Skeie, and cooperated with him in his business ventures. At the time of death, Birger Skeie was the chair of TTS Marine and CEO of Skeie Technology and Skeie Drilling & Production. He was also the chair of NODE, Norsupply and Skeie Rig Management and a board member of TTS Sense. He was formerly the CEO of Hydralift, which became National Oilwell Varco in 2002. He left the leadership of National Oilwell Varco in Norway in 2006. He died in August 2009 at the age of 58 due to a heart attack.
