= Asbjørn Aarseth =

Norwegian literary historian

- Born: 21 October 1935; Inderøy Municipality, Norway
- Died: 31 August 2009 (aged 73); Norway
- Education: University of Bergen (mag.art.)
- Occupation: Literary historian
- Employer: University of Bergen
- Known for: Lyriske strukturer Henrik Ibsen scholarship
- Notable work: Lyriske strukturer
- Awards: Member of the Norwegian Academy of Science and Letters

Asbjørn Aarseth (21 October 1935 – 31 August 2009) was a Norwegian literary historian, born in Inderøy Municipality.

Aarseth obtained the mag.art. degree (PhD equivalent) at the University of Bergen in 1963, received an academic position in literary studies here in 1967, and became professor of Nordic literature in 1985. He was a member of the Norwegian Academy of Science and Letters.

An important book was Lyriske strukturer ("Lyrical Structures"), written together with Atle Kittang, which came to be a standard work in lyrical analysis. He was also an authority on Henrik Ibsen, and was involved in the project Henrik Ibsens skrifter.

Aarseth died on 31 August 2009.
