= Leif Herbrand Eriksen =

Norwegian politician

Leif Herbrand Eriksen (31 July 1921 – 4 January 2009) was a Norwegian journalist and politician for the Labour Party.

He was born in Eidsvoll and finished his secondary school in 1941 at Oslo Cathedral School. In 1946 he was hired as a journalist in Arbeiderbladet. He also edited Arbeiderkalenderen. He retired in 1988.

He joined Oslo Labour Party and was a member of the school board. From 1977 to 1979 he was a private adviser (now known as political adviser) in the Ministry of Social Affairs.

He was engaged in social affairs and was the chairman of Frambu for twenty years, and edited the magazines Cerebral Parese-bladet and Reumatikeren. He was also a board member of the Norwegian People's Aid, and was active in the Norwegian Union of Journalists and Norges Forsvarsforening.

After 1983 he moved back to Eidsvoll and chaired the Labour Party branch there. Local historical books include Lensmannen. 800 år i samfunnets tjeneste (1996) and Andelva, treforedlingsindustrien og Nygård (2005). He died in January 2009, shortly after celebrating his diamond wedding.
