= Ragnar Frislid =

Norwegian writer, photographer and environmentalist

Ragnar Frislid (29 June 1926 – 14 June 2009) was a Norwegian writer, photographer and environmentalist.

He was born in Oslo. He was a journalist in Dagbladet from 1950 to 1959. From 1965 to 1986 he edited Norsk Natur, the magazine released by Norwegian Society for the Conservation of Nature. He also edited the magazines Jakt-Fiske-Friluftsliv and Fjell og Vidde as well as the yearbook of the Norwegian Trekking Association. He wrote about 30 books, and translated other books. His 1964 release Naturvern has been called the first Norwegian book about the conservation of nature.

In 1969 he wrote Norske dyr ('Animals of Norway') together with Arne Semb-Johansson. His translation Verdens dyr ('Animals of the World'), from English to Norwegian in 1984, became an issue of dispute in 1992, when the publishing house J.W. Cappelens Forlag and De norske Bokklubbene arranged for the making of a second edition. Frislid demanded a new fee of 159,579 kr in addition to the one-off fee of NOK 319,158 received in 1984. The publishing house won the trials in the district court as well as the court of appeal, but after years of legal battle, Frislid won in the Supreme Court of Norway in 1999.

Frislid also contributed to encyclopedias and radio. As a nature photographer he was a part of the Norwegian photo agency Samfoto and an honorary member of the organization Norwegian Nature Photographers. He died in June 2009.
