= Vince Sulyok =

Hungarian-Norwegian librarian and poet

Vince Sulyok (7 July 1932 – 9 August 2009) was a Hungarian-Norwegian librarian and poet.

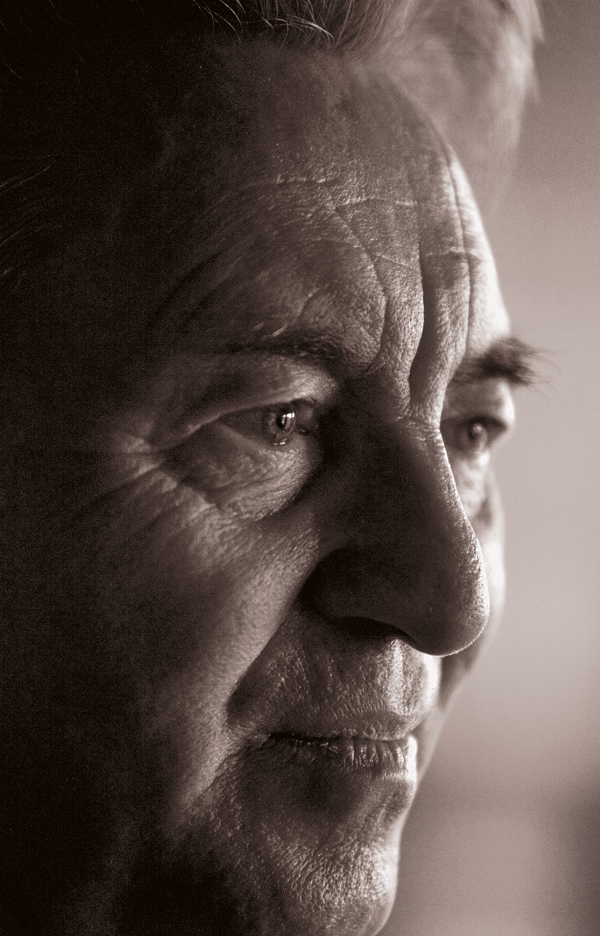
Vince Sulyok (7 July 1932 – 9 August 2009) was a Hungarian-Norwegian librarian and poet

He was born in Hungary. His job was at the University Library of Oslo, where he was a first librarian. He issued several poetry collections in Hungarian, and translated Norwegian and Danish poetry into Hungarian. He also issued non-fiction books such as Ungarns historie og kultur (1994). He died in August 2009 in Asker, having resided at Billingstad and previously at Åsterud.
