= Kiki Sørum =

Norwegian fashion writer (1939–2009)

Anne Christine "Kiki" Sørum (16 January 1939 – 30 August 2009) was a Norwegian fashion journalist, editor, and author. She worked as a fashion editor for the weekly magazine Hjemmet from 1973 to 1977 and general editor of the magazine Nicole from 1979 to 1981. She also worked as a freelancer for several publications, among these Verdens Gang, Se og Hør and Dagbladet.

The books she authored included Hollywood i moten (Hollywood in Fashion, 1986) and Kle deg magisk (Dress Magically, 1999). Sørum was also recognised internationally for her fashion writing, and received the French Ordre des Arts et des Lettres in 2003 and became Commander of the Order of the Lion of Finland in 2005.
