= Per Ulven =

Norwegian harness racer

Per Ulven (31 October 1925 – 15 December 2009) was a Norwegian harness racer.

He was born in Vang Municipality in Hedmark county, where he grew up on the family farm Bjørke. His father and brothers were also active horsemen. In 1928 his father moved to establish a stables at Bjerke Travbane, which also became Per Ulven's home field. He won 1750 races in Norway, among them five Norwegian championships. He is the only person, together with Gunnar Eggen, to win Norsk Travderby nine times.
