= Per Meinich =

Norwegian economist (1931–2009)

Per Meinich (16 June 1931 – 17 July 2009) was a Norwegian economist.

He was born in Nøtterøy Municipality. He took his cand.oecon. degree in 1955 and the dr.philos. degree in 1969 on the thesis A Monetary General Equilibrium Theory for an International Economy. He worked for the Norwegian Savings Banks Association from 1958 to 1960. He was a docent at the University of Oslo from 1966 to 1972 and as a professor from 1972 to his retirement. He was a member of the Norwegian Academy of Science and Letters. He died in July 2009.
