= Deaths in August 2009 =

The following is a list of deaths in August 2009.

Entries for each day are listed alphabetically by surname. A typical entry lists information in the following sequence:

- Name, age, country of citizenship at birth, subsequent country of citizenship (if applicable), reason for notability, cause of death (if known), and reference.

== August 2009 ==
=== 1 ===
- Jerome Anderson, 55, American basketball player (Boston Celtics) and coach.
- Corazon Aquino, 76, Filipino politician, first female President (1986–1992), colon cancer.
- Devendra Nath Dwivedi, 74, Indian politician, Governor designate of Gujarat.
- Flavia Irwin, 92, British painter.
- Edward D. Ives, 83, American folklorist and professor.
- Keith Macklin, 78, British journalist and broadcaster.
- George Taylor Morris, 62, American radio personality, throat cancer.
- Nicholas D'Antonio Salza, 93, Honduran Bishop of Juticalpa (1963–1977).
- Naomi Sims, 61, American model and author, breast cancer.
- Rana Chandra Singh, 78, Pakistani politician.
- Howard Smit, 98, American film make-up artist (The Wizard of Oz).
- Panakkad Sayeed Mohammedali Shihab Thangal, 73, Indian politician, cardiac arrest.
- Borka Vučić, 83, Serbian politician and banker, traffic collision.

=== 2 ===
- Shafiq al-Hout, 77, Palestinian politician, co-founder of the Palestine Liberation Organization, cancer.
- Adolf Endler, 78, German writer.
- Hironoshin Furuhashi, 80, Japanese swimmer, Vice President of FINA.
- Mark Green, 92, British prelate, Bishop of Aston (1972–1982).
- Billy Lee Riley, 75, American rockabilly musician, cancer.
- Stanley Robertson, 68, British folk singer and storyteller.
- Michael A. Wiener, 71, American radio mogul (Infinity Broadcasting) and philanthropist, cancer.
- Sidney Zion, 75, American journalist, cancer.

=== 3 ===
- Subhas Chakraborty, 66, Indian politician.
- Christopher Elrington, 79, English historian, general editor of the Victoria County History.
- Zelik Epstein, 96, American rabbi and rosh yeshiva.
- Charles Gwathmey, 71, American architect, esophageal cancer.
- Keith Kirton, 81, South African cricketer.
- Walter Philip Leber, 90, American Governor of the Panama Canal Zone (1967–1971).
- Nikolaos Makarezos, 90, Greek army officer, leader of the Greek military junta of 1967–1974.
- Reiko Ohara, 62, Japanese actress, intracerebral hemorrhage.
- Svend Ove Pedersen, 88, Danish Olympic bronze medal-winning (1952) rower.
- Zinovy Vysokovsky, 76, Russian actor.

=== 4 ===
- Hirotugu Akaike, 81, Japanese statistician, pneumonia.
- David Ames, 72, American football player (New York Titans), complications from amyotrophic lateral sclerosis.
- Svend Auken, 66, Danish politician, prostate cancer.
- Benson, appr. 25, British common carp, voted as Britain's Favourite Carp (death announced on this date).
- George I. Cannon, 89, American church leader (The Church of Jesus Christ of Latter-day Saints).
- Ross Dufty, 81, Australian cricketer.
- Anita Farra, 103, Italian actress.
- Sir David Haslam, 86, British admiral.
- Jo O-ryeon, 56, South Korean Olympic swimmer.
- Ergash Karimov, 75, Uzbek actor and comedian.
- Amos Kenan, 82, Israeli columnist, painter, sculptor, playwright and novelist, Alzheimer's disease.
- Günther Morbach, 81, German classical bass in opera and concert.
- Joseph Msika, 85, Zimbabwean politician, Vice President, stroke.
- Gonzalo Santos, 68, Northern Mariana Island Cabinet member, educator and principal, lung cancer.
- Blake Snyder, 51, American screenwriter (Stop! Or My Mom Will Shoot, Blank Check) and author (Save The Cat! The Last Book on Screenwriting You'll Ever Need), cardiac arrest.
- Ole A. Sørli, 63, Norwegian manager and record producer.
- Mbah Surip, 60, Indonesian reggae singer, heart attack.
- Robert Mitsuhiro Takasugi, 78, American federal judge.
- Martha Ware, 91, American judge, first female judge in Plymouth County, Massachusetts.
- James Wiegold, 75, Welsh mathematician, leukemia.

=== 5 ===
- G. A. Cohen, 68, Canadian Marxist political philosopher.
- Jordi Sabater Pi, 87, Spanish ethologist, discovered albino gorilla Snowflake.
- Sheikha Hessa bint Salman Al Khalifa, appr. 76, Bahraini royal, widow of Isa ibn Salman Al Khalifah, mother of King Hamad ibn Isa Al Khalifah.
- Baitullah Mehsud, appr. 35, Pakistani militant, injuries resulting from a military strike.
- Budd Schulberg, 95, American screenwriter (On the Waterfront, The Harder They Fall, A Face in the Crowd), Oscar winner (1955).
- Daljit Singh, 73-74, Indian cricketer.
- Al Tomko, 77, Canadian professional wrestler, pancreatic cancer.

=== 6 ===
- Bahadır Akkuzu, 54, Turkish musician, heart attack.
- Rolf Back, 81, Finnish Olympic sprinter.
- Helen Brotherton, 95, British conservationist.
- Maup Caransa, 93, Dutch property developer.
- Riccardo Cassin, 100, Italian mountaineer.
- Savka Dabčević-Kučar, 85, Croatian politician.
- Willy DeVille, 58, American singer–songwriter (Mink DeVille), pancreatic cancer.
- Stanley Haidasz, 86, Canadian politician, MP for Trinity (1957–1958) and Parkdale (1962–1978), Senator (1978–1998).
- Charles Harrison, 67, British art historian.
- John Hughes, 59, American film director (The Breakfast Club, Ferris Bueller's Day Off) and screenwriter (Home Alone), heart attack.
- Anthony Impreveduto, 61, American corrupt politician, member of the New Jersey General Assembly (1987–2004), lymphoma.
- Jack T. Kirby, 70, American historian, winner of the 2007 Bancroft Prize, heart failure.
- Anilza Leoni, 75, Brazilian actress, emphysema.
- Donald Marshall Jr., 55, Canadian wrongfully convicted of murder, complications from a lung transplant.
- Murali, 55, Indian actor, heart attack.
- Willibrordus S. Rendra, 73, Indonesian poet.
- Sam, 4, Australian koala made famous after the 2009 Black Saturday bushfires, euthanised.
- Aram Tigran, 75, Armenian singer and oud player.
- Otha Young, 66, American musician and songwriter, cancer.

=== 7 ===
- Jimmy Bedford, 69, American distiller (Jack Daniel's), heart attack.
- Frank G. Dickey, 91, American educator, president of the University of Kentucky (1956–1963).
- Gibson, 7, American Great Dane therapy dog, recognized by Guinness Book of World Records as world's tallest dog, bone cancer.
- Carleen Hutchins, 98, American violin maker.
- Taha Muhie-eldin Marouf, 80, Iraqi politician, Vice President (1975–2003).
- Gulshan Kumar Mehta, 72, Indian songwriter, heart failure.
- John Harber Phillips, 75, Australian jurist, Chief Justice of Victoria (1991–2003).
- Danko Popović, 81, Serbian writer.
- Louis E. Saavedra, 76, American politician, Mayor of Albuquerque, New Mexico (1973; 1989–1993), brain cancer.
- Mike Seeger, 75, American folk musician, folklorist and banjo player, cancer.
- Paul Silver, 60, American seismologist, traffic collision.
- Sergio Stefanini, 87, Italian Olympic basketball player.
- Tatiana Stepa, 46, Romanian folk singer, cervical cancer.
- Seiichi Tagawa, 91, Japanese politician, party leader (New Liberal Club).
- Anne Wexler, 79, American political adviser and lobbyist, breast cancer.

=== 8 ===
- Alfonso Calderón, 78, Chilean writer and poet, heart attack.
- Yehuda Cohen, 95, Israeli Supreme Court justice.
- Cal Ermer, 85, American baseball coach and manager (Minnesota Twins).
- Harold Hitchcock, 95, British artist.
- Daniel Jarque, 26, Spanish footballer, heart attack.
- David Hillman, 74, English operatic tenor, brain tumour.
- Pål Kraby, 77, Norwegian barrister and businessman.
- Peter Milton, 80, Australian politician, MP (1980–1990).
- Jone Railomo, 28, Fijian rugby player, member of the Fiji 2007 Rugby World Cup team.
- Barnett Rosenberg, 82, American chemist, discovered cisplatin.
- Raul Solnado, 79, Portuguese actor and comedian, cardiovascular disease.
- Michael Viner, 65, American record producer (Incredible Bongo Band), cancer.
- Jerry Wisdom, 61, Bahamian Olympic sprinter.

=== 9 ===
- Frank Borth, 91, American comic book artist.
- Tommy Clinton, 83, Irish footballer (Everton, Republic of Ireland).
- Thierry Jonquet, 55, French writer.
- William Lindsay Osteen Sr., 79, American judge of the District Court for the Middle District of North Carolina (1991–2006).
- John Quade, 71, American character actor (Every Which Way But Loose, The Outlaw Josey Wales).
- Rodney Scott Webb, 74, American federal judge, cancer.
- Jasmine You, 30, Japanese bassist (Versailles), undisclosed causes.

=== 10 ===
- Laurie Bickerton, 92, Australian football player.
- Josef Burg, 97, Ukrainian Yiddish writer, stroke.
- Alik Djabrailov, 42, Russian charity worker, shot.
- Peter Dunnill, 71, British biochemical engineer.
- Albert L. Gordon, 94, American gay rights legal activist.
- Rita Inos, 55, Northern Mariana Island educator and politician, first female candidate for Lieutenant Governor, cancer.
- Andy Kessler, 48, American skateboarder, wasp sting.
- Ede Király, 82, Hungarian Olympic silver medal-winning (1948) figure skater.
- Urpo Korhonen, 86, Finnish Olympic gold medal-winning (1952) cross-country skier.
- Sylvia Lennick, 93, Canadian actress and comedian, complications from pneumonia.
- Merlyn Mantle, 77, American author, widow of Mickey Mantle, Alzheimer's disease.
- Art McKinlay, 77, American Olympic silver medal-winning (1956) rower, heart attack.
- Zarema Sadulayeva, 33, Russian activist, head of children's aid organization in Chechnya, shot.
- Renzo Sambo, 67, Italian Olympic gold medal-winning (1968) rower.
- Thomas C. Slater, 68, American politician, member of the Rhode Island House of Representatives (since 1994), lung cancer.
- Yosef Tamir, 94, Israeli politician and environmental activist, member of the Knesset (1965–1981).
- Francisco Valdés, 66, Chilean footballer, heart failure.

=== 11 ===
- Bektas Abubakirov, 36, Kazakhstani boxer.
- Malik Akhmedilov, 33, Russian journalist, shot.
- Campbell R. Bridges, 71, British gemologist and adventurer, speared.
- Nuala Fennell, 73, Irish politician.
- José Ramón García Antón, 61, Spanish engineer and politician in Valencian Community.
- Tom Hennies, 70, American police officer and politician.
- Valeriu Lazarov, 73, Romanian-born Spanish television producer.
- Aykut Oray, 67, Turkish actor, heart attack.
- Behjat Sadr, 85, Iranian painter, heart attack.
- Eunice Kennedy Shriver, 88, American activist, founder of the Special Olympics, sister of John F. Kennedy.
- Jan Sillo, 32, South African footballer, traffic collision.
- Kitty White, 86, American jazz vocalist, stroke.
- Margaret Bush Wilson, 90, American lawyer and activist, multiple organ failure.

=== 12 ===
- Rashied Ali, 76, American jazz drummer, heart attack.
- Ruslan Amerkhanov, Russian official, Ingushetia construction minister, shot.
- Howard M. Ervin, 93, American Christian scholar.
- Ruth Ford, 98, American model and actress.
- Gladys Gillem, 88, American professional wrestler, Alzheimer's disease.
- John Gregson, Baron Gregson, 85, British businessman and politician.
- Stephen MacDonald, 76, British actor, director and playwright.
- Zaw One, 64, Burmese actor and singer, liver disease.
- Nalin Seneviratne, 78, Sri Lankan general, Commander of the Army (1985–1988).
- Karl Von Hess, 90, American professional wrestler, Alzheimer's disease.
- Shingo Yamashiro, 70, Japanese actor, pneumonia.
- Les Paul, 94, American guitarist and inventor, complications from pneumonia.

=== 13 ===
- John Bentley, 92, British actor (Crossroads).
- M. Watt Espy, 77, American researcher and author on capital punishment.
- Lavelle Felton, 29, American basketball player (Paderborn Baskets), shot.
- Brian McLaughlin, 54, British footballer (Celtic, Motherwell).
- Joseph Gilles Napoléon Ouellet, 87, Canadian archbishop of Rimouski.
- Al Purvis, 80, Canadian Olympic gold medal-winning ice hockey player (1952).
- Dobby Walker, 90, American labor lawyer, stroke.

=== 14 ===
- Frank Branston, 70, British politician, Mayor of Bedford, aortic aneurysm.
- John Hughes, 84, British politician, MP for Coventry North East (1987–1992).
- Ted Kennedy, 83, Canadian hockey player (Toronto Maple Leafs), heart failure.
- Lawrence Lucie, 101, American jazz guitarist.
- Kimani Maruge, 90, Kenyan student, oldest man to start primary school, stomach cancer.
- Philip Saltzman, 80, Mexican-born American television writer and producer (Columbo, Barnaby Jones).
- Gerolf Steiner, 101, German zoologist.

=== 15 ===
- Charles Anderson, 91, Australian politician, member of the New South Wales Legislative Council (1951–1953).
- Kenneth Bacon, 64, American president of Refugees International, Asst Secretary of Defense for Public Affairs, melanoma.
- Florin Bogardo, 67, Romanian singer.
- Virginia Davis, 90, American child actress.
- Jim Dickinson, 67, American musician and record producer.
- Carlos Gómez, 92, Paraguayan actor.
- Joesoef Isak, 81, Indonesian publisher.
- Mary Catherine Lamb, American textile artist
- Shūe Matsubayashi, 89, Japanese film director, heart failure.
- Abdel Latif Moussa, 50, Palestinian cleric, leader of Jund Ansar Allah, bomb blast.
- Sammy Petrillo, 74, American comedian, cancer.
- André Prokovsky, 70, French dancer, cancer.
- Louis Rosen, 91, American nuclear physicist (Manhattan Project), inventor of the atom smasher, subdural hematoma.
- John Stroud, 54, British television director.
- Malcolm Richard Wilkey, 90, American federal judge and diplomat.
- Eleutherius Winance, 100, Belgian-born American monk, philosophy professor, founder of St. Andrew's Abbey, heart attack.
- Zeke Zechella, 89, American businessman.

=== 16 ===
- Alistair Campbell, 84, New Zealand poet.
- Mualla Eyüboğlu, 90, Turkish architect, one of the country's first female architects, heart failure.
- Svetlana Fedorenko, 36, Russian aviator and world aerobatics champion, plane crash.
- Paul Healion, 31, Irish cyclist, traffic collision.
- Warren E. Hearnes, 86, American politician, Governor of Missouri (1965–1973).
- Khalid bin Mahfouz, 60, Saudi Arabian billionaire banker, heart attack.
- Richard Moore, 83, American cinematographer, co-founder of Panavision.
- John Mulagada, 71, Indian Bishop of Eluru, first Dalit to become a bishop.
- Ed Reimers, 96, American character actor (Star Trek, The Barefoot Executive).
- Laurie Rowley, 68, British comedy writer (The Two Ronnies, Not the Nine O'Clock News), heart attack.
- Robert Thieme, 91, American dispensationalist theologian.
- Igor Tkachenko, 45, Russian Air Force pilot (Russian Knights), stunt collision.
- Burl Toler, 81, American football official, first African American official in the NFL.

=== 17 ===
- Paul Hogue, 69, American basketball player, heart and kidney failure.
- Gian Paolo Iraldo, 66, Italian sprinter, car accident.
- Patricia Kippax, 67, British Olympic sprinter.
- Tullio Kezich, 80, Italian film critic.
- Grażyna Miller, 52, Polish poet and translator.
- Gildo Rodrigues, 69, Brazilian association football manager.
- Tiffany Simelane, 21, Swazi beauty pageant contestant, Miss Swaziland 2008, suicide by poisoning.
- Reno Thomas, 87, American politician, member of the Pennsylvania House of Representatives.
- Davey Williams, 81, American baseball player (New York Giants).
- Viola Wyse, 61, Canadian Coast Salish tribal leader and civil servant.

=== 18 ===
- Mir Maswood Ali, 80, Indian-born Canadian mathematician, idiopathic pulmonary fibrosis.
- Hildegard Behrens, 72, German soprano, aortic aneurysm.
- Charles Bond, 94, American Air Force general, pilot with Flying Tigers, dementia.
- Wilf Diedricks, 64, South African cricket umpire.
- Rose Friedman, 98, Ukrainian-born American economist, widow of Milton Friedman.
- Jason Getsy, 33, American convicted murderer, execution by lethal injection.
- Ron Irwin, 85, Australian footballer.
- Dic Jones, 75, Welsh poet.
- Kim Dae-jung, 85, South Korean politician, President (1998–2003), Nobel Peace Prize recipient, heart failure.
- Hugo Loetscher, 79, Swiss author, complications from surgery.
- Jack McGeorge, 60, American munitions analyst and BDSM activist, complications from heart surgery.
- Peter Mui, 56, American fashion designer, heart failure.
- Robert Novak, 78, American conservative author and pundit, brain cancer.
- Fernanda Pivano, 92, Italian writer, journalist, translator and critic.
- Rufus Rogers, 96, New Zealand politician.
- Mária Vadász, 59, Hungarian Olympic bronze medal-winning team handball player at 1976 Olympics.
- Geertje Wielema, 75, Dutch swimmer.

=== 19 ===
- Paul Ashbee, 91, British archaeologist.
- Carlos González Nova, 92, Mexican businessman.
- Donald M. Grant, 82, American science fiction publisher.
- Don Hewitt, 86, American television producer, creator of 60 Minutes, pancreatic cancer.
- Harry Kermode, 87, Canadian Olympic basketball player.
- John Marek, 47, American convicted murderer, execution by lethal injection.
- Anthony Petro Mayalla, 69, Tanzanian archbishop of Mwanza (since 1987).
- Edward Rondthaler, 104, American typographer.
- Vic Snell, 81, English footballer (Ipswich Town).
- Park M. Strader, 64, American politician, cancer.
- Bobby Thomson, 65, British footballer, prostate cancer.
- Thierry Thys, 78, American pilot and metallurgical engineer, glider crash.

=== 20 ===
- Marcel-André Buffet, 87, French Olympic sailor.
- Semyon Farada, 75, Russian actor.
- Larry Knechtel, 69, American keyboardist (Bread), bassist and session musician (The Beach Boys, The Doors), heart attack.
- Karla Kuskin, 77, American children's author and illustrator, corticobasal degeneration.
- Dudu Topaz, 62, Israeli actor, suicide by hanging.
- Gordon Woods, 57, American veterinary scientist, created first cloned mule (Idaho Gem).

=== 21 ===
- Ernest Brown, 93, American tap dancer.
- Johnny Carter, 75, American singer (The Flamingos, The Dells), lung cancer.
- Edward Goldsmith, 80, British environmentalist.
- Christopher John Lamb, 59, British biochemist.
- Chris McCubbins, 63, American-born Canadian Olympic athlete, leukemia.
- Leo Obstbaum, 39, Argentine-born Spanish design director for the 2010 Winter Olympics.
- Rex Shelley, 78, Singaporean author, lung cancer.
- Geoffrey Tozer, 54, Australian pianist, liver disease.
- Dean Turner, 37, Australian bassist (Magic Dirt), lung cancer.
- Pedro Yoma, 82, Chilean Olympic track and field athlete.

=== 22 ===
- David Avadon, 60, American illusionist, heart attack.
- Horst E. Brandt, 86, German film director.
- Vicki Cruse, 40, American aerobatic pilot, air show accident.
- Muriel Duckworth, 100, Canadian feminist and activist, complications from a fall.
- Elmer Kelton, 83, American Western novelist.
- Iftikhar Ali Khan, Pakistani general, Defence Secretary (1997–1999), heart attack.
- Erkki Laine, 51, Finnish ice hockey player, drowned.
- Beryl Sprinkel, 85, American economist, Lambert-Eaton myasthenic syndrome.
- Adrien Zeller, 69, French politician and humanist, heart attack.

=== 23 ===
- Alexander Bozhkov, 58, Bulgarian politician, Deputy Prime Minister (1997–1999), cancer.
- Stanley Kaplan, 90, American businessman and scholastic test preparation pioneer, founder of Kaplan, Inc., heart disease.
- Anna-Maria Müller, 60, German luger, 1972 Winter Olympics women's singles gold medalist.
- Pierre Samuel, 87, French mathematician, arms control and environmental activist.
- Jan Sedivka, 91, Australian violinist.
- Edzo Toxopeus, 91, Dutch politician, Minister of the Interior (1959–1965).
- William Williams, 93, American businessman and team owner (Cincinnati Bengals, Cincinnati Reds).

=== 24 ===
- Joseph Corbett Jr., 80, American murderer and kidnapper, suicide by gunshot.
- Sir Harry Fang, 86, Hong Kong orthopaedic surgeon, President of Rehabilitation International (1980–1984), respiratory failure.
- Frank Marcus Fernando, 77, Sri Lankan Bishop of Chilaw.
- Leif Flengsrud, 86, Norwegian Olympic cyclist.
- Janullah Hashimzada, 40, Afghan journalist, Pakistan bureau chief for Shamshad TV, shot.
- Kashin, 40, New Zealand Asian elephant sponsored by ASB Bank, euthanised.
- Joe Maneri, 82, American jazz composer, musician and inventor, complications from heart surgery.
- Eduardo Roquero, 59, Filipino politician, Representative (2004–2007), four-time Mayor of San Jose del Monte.
- Toni Sailer, 73, Austrian ski racer, laryngeal cancer.
- T. J. Turner, 46, American football player (Miami Dolphins), complications from a stroke.
- Jim Urbanek, 64, American football player (Miami Dolphins).

=== 25 ===
- Berle Adams, 92, American music industry executive (MCA).
- Bob Carroll, 73, American historian and author.
- William Emerson, 86, American journalist and editor, stroke.
- Nikos Garoufallou, 72, Greek actor, traffic collision.
- Ted Kennedy, 77, American politician, U.S. Senator from Massachusetts (since 1962), brain cancer.
- Eduardo Mendoza Goiticoa, 92, Venezuelan politician, Minister of Agriculture (1945–1947), director of the Human Rights Foundation.
- Carl K. Moeddel, 71, American Auxiliary Bishop of Cincinnati (1993–2007).
- Ray Ramsey, 88, American football player (Chicago Cardinals), complications from a fall.
- Mandé Sidibé, 69, Malian politician and economist, Prime Minister (2000–2002).

=== 26 ===
- Abdul Aziz al-Hakim, 56, Iraqi politician, lung cancer.
- Hyman Bloom, 96, Latvian-born American painter of mystical Jewish works.
- Per Christensen, 75, Norwegian actor (Hotel Cæsar, Elling).
- Sadie Corré, 91, British actress (The Rocky Horror Picture Show).
- Dominick Dunne, 83, American writer and investigative journalist, bladder cancer.
- Zeyad Errafae’ie, 40, Syrian voice/television actor, traffic collision
- Ellie Greenwich, 68, American songwriter ("Be My Baby", "Chapel of Love"), heart attack.
- Sir Jack Harris, 2nd Baronet, 103, British-born New Zealand businessman.
- Billy Kenneally, 83, Irish politician.
- William Korey, 87, American lobbyist, Anti-Defamation League director, cardiac arrhythmia.
- Lin Hui-kuan, 51, Taiwanese politician, MLY (2002–2009), sepsis.
- Birger Skeie, 58, Norwegian marine services company chairman, heart attack.

=== 27 ===
- Harry Bell, 83, Canadian ice hockey player.
- Nicholas Cavendish, 6th Baron Chesham, 67, British aristocrat and politician.
- Shota Chochishvili, 59, Georgian Olympic gold medalist in judo, leukemia.
- Alex Grass, 82, American businessman, founder of Rite Aid drugstores, lung cancer.
- Dave Laut, 52, American Olympic bronze medalist in shot put, shot.
- Sergey Mikhalkov, 96, Russian writer and poet (National Anthem of the Soviet Union and National Anthem of Russia).
- Rafiu Oluwa, 78, Nigerian Olympic sprinter.
- Joaquín Ruiz-Giménez, 96, Spanish politician.
- Virgilio Savona, 89, Italian singer (Quartetto Cetra), Parkinson's disease.
- Shing Fui-On, 54, Hong Kong actor, nasopharyngeal carcinoma.

=== 28 ===
- Chanel, 21, American world's oldest dog.
- DJ AM, 36, American club disc jockey and musician (Crazy Town), suspected drug overdose.
- Richard Egan, 73, American businessman and diplomat, suicide by gunshot.
- Emil Glad, 81, Croatian actor.
- Noël Jones, 76, British prelate, Bishop of Sodor and Man (1989–2003), cancer.
- Günter Kießling, 83, German general.
- Eli Thompson, 36, American skydiver, skydiving accident.
- Wayne Tippit, 76, American character actor (Melrose Place), respiratory insufficiency.
- Henk van Ulsen, 82, Dutch actor.

=== 29 ===
- Gennaro Angiulo, 90, American Mafia underboss, renal failure.
- Chris Connor, 81, American jazz singer, cancer.
- Simon Dee, 74, British radio disc jockey and television presenter, bone cancer.
- Sam Etcheverry, 79, American-born Canadian football player, member of the Canadian Football Hall of Fame, cancer.
- Gustavo Martínez Frías, 74, Colombian archbishop of Nueva Pamplona.
- Frank Gardner, 78, Australian motor racing driver.
- Pete Horeck, 86, Canadian ice hockey player, prostate cancer.
- Bill Osborne, 62, American racing driver.
- Mady Rahl, 94, German actress.
- Dave Smith, 76, American college football player and coach, cancer.
- Yolanda Varela, 79, Mexican film actress.

=== 30 ===
- Medardas Čobotas, 81, Lithuanian politician.
- Prithvi Nath Kaula, 85, Indian librarian.
- Ildikó Kishonti, 62, Hungarian actress.
- Marie Knight, 89, American gospel singer, pneumonia.
- Sheila Lukins, 66, American cook and food writer, brain cancer.
- Robert J. Matthews, 82, American Latter-day Saints educator and scholar, open-heart surgery complications.
- Nils Brage Nordlander, 90, Swedish speciality doctor.
- Christos Palaiologos, 59, Greek left-wing politician, former mayor of Livadeia,
- Jack Phillips, 87, American baseball player.
- Mark Pringle, 50, Australian triathlete, road accident.
- Kiki Sørum, 70, Norwegian fashion journalist.
- Nancy Talbot, 89, American businesswoman, co-founder of Talbots retail stores, Alzheimer's disease.
- Percy Tetzlaff, 89, New Zealand rugby union player (Waikato, Auckland, national team).
- Simon Thirgood, 46, British biologist and ecologist, building collapse.

=== 31 ===
- Asbjørn Aarseth, 73, Norwegian literary historian.
- Abu Abbas, 75, Bangladeshi politician.
- William Wright Abbot, 87, American archivist and historian, congestive heart failure.
- John Choi Young-su, 67, South Korean archbishop of Daegu.
- Ping Duenas, 78, Guamanian politician, heart attack.
- Barry Flanagan, 68, British sculptor, motor neurone disease.
- Jesse Fortune, 79, American blues singer.
- Frederick Gore, 95, British artist.
- Amos Hawley, 98, American sociologist.
- Eddie Higgins, 77, American jazz pianist, cancer.
- Torsten Lindberg, 92, Swedish Olympic gold medal-winning (1948) football player.
- Eraño Manalo, 84, Filipino Executive Minister of the Iglesia ni Cristo (1963–2009), cardiopulmonary arrest.
- Jack Manning, 93, American film, stage and television actor.
- Anna Belle Clement O'Brien, 86, American politician, Tennessee state senator (1976–1996), complications from a fall.
- George Piranian, 95, American mathematician.
