= Murder of Zarema Sadulayeva and Alik Dzhabrailov =

Murder in Russia

- Date: August 10–11, 2009
- Location: Grozny, Chechnya, Russia; 43.261624°N 45.661891°E

On the early morning of August 11, 2009, the bodies of Zarema Sadulayeva and Alik Dzhabrailov were found in a car's trunk on the outskirts of Grozny. Their bodies had traces of many bullets. Sadulayeva and Dzhabrailov had been kidnapped a day earlier on August 10, 2009, from their workplace, the office of non-profit organization Let's Save the Generation, located in Grozny.

When news of their abduction became known among human rights organizations, they raised alert to save them. The discovery of their bodies the next day resulted in worldwide outcry among human rights defenders and politicians.

== Victims ==
Zarema Sadulayeva (born 1974) and Alik (Umar) Lechayevich Dzhabrailov (born August 11, 1976) had been newlyweds—their wedding had taken place a month before their deaths. Sadulayeva had ran the charity Let's Save the Generation, which helped children with injuries and disabilities receive proper treatment and education. Sadulayeva was from the village of Shalakhi, located near Grozny. A woman, being familiar with Sadulayeva, had told the press under anonymity that Sadulayeva was pregnant at the time of her murder. Dzhabrailov, who shortly before his murder, had been sentenced to 4 years in prison for participating in hostilities, was released in early 2009 under an amnesty.

== Let's Save the Generation ==
Zarema Sadulayeva was head of the Grozny office of the charity Let's Save the Generation that was dedicated to help victims of war, including mine victims. The Chechen charity, a nongovernmental organization, was founded in 2001 for psychological and physical rehabilitation to disabled children, orphans, and other victims of war. The group worked closely with UNICEF, for training about landmines and protection of the rights of the disabled. The charity was located in the centre of Grozny.

== The only witness to the abduction ==
The only witness to the abduction, an employee of the charity, had told about six unidentified persons, four of which were in camouflage clothes while the remaining two wore civilian clothes. The unknown individuals entered the office at 2 pm on August 10, 2009, and brought away Sadulayeva and Dzhabrailov. The abductors then returned to the office to pick up their phones and the car that belonged to the couple. The kidnappers explained they were from security services and had to take Sadulayeva and Dzhabrailov away for questioning; the kidnappers left their contact information. When Sadulayeva and Dzhabrailov's colleagues called the contact number left by the visitors, nobody had answered.

When the investigation was started, the single witness was taken under protection by the state due to fear for his life.

== Searching for the kidnapped ==
The news of the abduction of Sadulayeva and Dzhabrailov quickly spread among human rights activists, who gathered on the evening of August 10, 2009, at the police building in Grozny, where the parents of the couple were summoned for questioning. Two bodies with traces of bullet wounds were found the next day, in the early morning of August 11, 2009, in the Zavodskoy district of Grozny, in the village of Chernorechye, in the trunk of a car that belonged to Dzhabrailov.

== Reaction of the Russian authorities ==
The head of the Chechen Republic, Ramzan Kadyrov, made a statement on August 11, 2009, about the murder that had taken place and that it was a challenge to the Chechen government and himself. He demanded that the security forces solve the crime as soon as possible.

President Dmitry Medvedev ordered the Office of the Prosecutor General of the Russian Federation, Ministry of Internal Affairs, and the Federal Security Service to investigate the crime and find the killers. Medvedev also instructed the authorities of the Chechen Republic to provide any assistance to the federal authorities in their investigation of the crime.

== Investigation ==
On August 11, 2009, Vladimir Markin, Russian Prosecutor General's Investigative Committee spokesman, spoke about conducting an investigation to determine the circumstances of the murders as well as the perpetrators, and a group of experts from the Russian Prosecutor General's Investigative Committee had flown to Grozny to help solve the case.

On August 11, 2009, Ramzan Kadyrov, head of the Chechen Republic, described the case as an "inhuman crime" and he would take personal control of the investigation.

On December 10, 2009, internet portal Caucasian Knot wrote that when the investigation into the murders had begun, the colleagues of the murdered activists and their friends criticized that, because the investigation had said that Dzhabrailov had been killed because he took part in Chechen warfare, he could've been killed because of a feud after the warfare. His wife was killed afterwards, but friends and colleagues argued that if that were to be true, they questioned why Sadulayeva's body had such severe traces of torture.

On July 15, 2012, Caucasian Knot published an interview with Human Rights Watch's Russian senior official, Tatiana Lokshina, where she said: "...one witness who saw the kidnappers was questioned by the investigation and a facial composite was composed. The witness had known the telephone number of one of the visitors. The investigation then took two years with the witness's testimony to identify the kidnapper. However, when the kidnapper was identified, it was revealed that the kidnapper was a police officer in the Kurchaloy Police Force who died during one of the police special operations. Therefore, there is no more investigation to be done by now."

On January 22, 2015, investigative journalist Elena Milashina, writing for Novaya Gazeta, wrote that the murders weren't yet under investigation: "...in Chechnya, unknown individuals kidnapped and killed human rights defender Natalya Estemirova, Alik Dzhabrailov, and Zarema Sadulayeva. During a special security operation, led by Ramzan Kadyrov, another activist, Zarema Gaysanova, disappeared. Not a single one of the offences against the persons that are severe and dangerous was ever investigated until today."
