= Winnemucca Mule Race =

Winnemucca Mule Races, Show and Draft Horse Challenge is held at Winnemucca, Nevada, each spring and serves as the first leg of the American Mule Racing Association's triple crown. On June 3 and 4, 2006, the race became the first known athletic event involving animal clones. On June 3, the mule clones Idaho Gem and Idaho Star won their first races, trials for the Humboldt Futurity. In the Futurity on June 4, Idaho Gem finished fourth and Idaho Star finished seventh among the field of eight starters.

The 2011 races were cancelled because of an outbreak of Equine Herpes Virus (EHV-1) in several Western states.
