= Gordon Woods =

Gordon Woods (July 14, 1952 – August 20, 2009) was an American veterinary scientist who co-created Idaho Gem, the world's first cloned mule. Idaho Gem was the first clone born in the horse family.

== Early life ==
Woods was raised in northern Idaho. He obtained his bachelor's degree from the University of Idaho. Woods received a doctorate of veterinary medicine from Colorado State University. He later obtained a second doctorate in reproductive biology from the University of Wisconsin–Madison.

== Career ==
Woods first taught veterinary medicine at Cornell University.

Woods founded the Northwest Equine Reproduction Laboratory in Idaho in 1986. He moved to Moscow, Idaho, and he taught at Washington State University in Pullman, WA until he joined the faculty of the University of Idaho in 1988 as an Animal and Veterinary Science Department professor.

Woods, along with colleagues Dr. Dirk Vanderwall of University of Idaho and Dr. Ken White of Utah State University, led a team of scientists in 2003 that cloned Idaho Gem, the world's first cloned mule. The cloning of Idaho Gem was a part of a larger scientific study intended to understand human diseases. Horses, mules, and other equines have lower rates of cancer than humans. Woods, Vanderwall, White and their team hoped that the cloning of mules and other equines would provide an important scientific insight into the different cancer rates between humans and equines. Woods was particularly interested in the role that calcium played in the development of cancer. Horses and mules have less calcium in their cell walls than humans.

Woods' colleague, Dirk Vanderwall, later explained Woods' goals during the Idaho Gem cloning, "That certainly was another primary focus of Gordon's...to use the horse as a model to try to understand age-onset diseases in people. Gordon's hypothesis was that excessive intracellular calcium in human cells could be an underlying factor in age-onset diseases."

Woods departed the University of Idaho in 2007 and joined the faculty of Colorado State University. He became a professor in the school's College of Veterinary Medicine and Biomedical Sciences.

== Death ==
Woods died unexpectedly at the Medical Center of the Rockies in Loveland, Colorado, at the age of 57. He was survived by his wife, Shauna, to whom he had been married for 37 years, four children, and seven grandchildren.
