= Thierry Thys =

American pilot and metallurgical engineer

- Born: May 2, 1931; San Francisco, California, U.S.
- Died: August 19, 2009 (aged 78); White Knob Mountains, Idaho, U.S.
- Occupation: Metallurgical Engineer

Thierry Thys (May 2, 1931 – August 19, 2009) was an American pilot and metallurgical engineer, who held the world's distance and altitude record for sailplane flight in 1970, and in 2002, made the first self-launched sailplane flight from Pt. Barrow, Alaska to Cape Horn, Chile in a Stemme SV10 motor glider.

== Early life ==
Thys was born May 2, 1931, in San Francisco, California. He grew up in nearby Sacramento, California, and graduated from Fountain Valley School, Colorado Springs, in 1948. He attended the University of Virginia, Sacramento Junior College, U.C. Berkeley, and Stanford, before graduating with a B.S. in Metallurgy from the Massachusetts Institute of Technology in 1953. A winner of the MIT Distinguished Air Force ROTC Cadets Award, he served in the United States Air Force as a Lieutenant from 1953 to 1955.

== Career ==
In 1956, he and his brother Edouard took over a struggling, seven-person metal casting company in Berkeley, moved it to San Leandro, California, expanded it, and renamed it Precision Founders Incorporated (PFI). Thys found great fulfillment in the diversity of his work, from designing specialized equipment and championing new casting technologies to building a cost accounting system and serving as president of the Investment Casting Institute. He served 32 years as PFI's Vice President of Marketing, developing the company's sales force and acquired many large customers, chiefly in the areas of nuclear power, aircraft engines and aerospace. He also broadened the reach of U.S. investment casting technology into global markets by arranging technology transfers with customers in Japan, Korea, Taiwan, Israel, Egypt, Italy, France, Belgium and Germany. The company was sold in 1988 to Wyman-Gordon.

== Aviation and exploration ==
An avid pilot from the age of 14, Thys held private and commercial certificates with instrument rating for single engine, land and sea, multi-engine aircraft, sailplanes and helicopters. In 1970, he made the world's third longest sailplane flight, a distance of 570 nautical miles (1,060 km). In 1976 he flew his twin-engine Piper Comanche from California across the Atlantic to the edge of the Iron Curtain. As a young man he raced sailboats; in 1990 he bought a Gulfstar 50 sloop, and in 1993 sailed it from Mystic, Conn., to San Francisco through the Panama Canal. In 1996, he purchased a Russian YAK 18-T and flew it from Smolensk, Russia, to Magadan. After graduating from the National Russian Helicopter Academy of Medyn in 1999, he embarked on three attempts to fly across Russia, often stymied by licensing and border-crossing issues, but finally made the trip, flying a Russian MI-2 helicopter from Almaty, Kazakhstan across the Bering Straits to Alaska, and then on to Oakland, California. In 2002, he made the first self-launched sailplane flight from Pt. Barrow, Alaska to Cape Horn in his Stemme SV10 motor glider, a trip of over 10,000 miles (16,000 km). He was made a member of the New York Explorers Club in 2004.

== Death ==
On August 19, 2009, Thys was flying solo in a two-seat 1998 Stemme S10-VT powered glider, joining Stemme pilots soaring in the vicinity of Arco, Idaho. At the end of the day he was reported missing after he failed to return. The aircraft was discovered the following evening in a Civil Air Patrol search in remote site in the White Knob Mountains at an elevation of about 9,250 feet (2,820 m). On August 21 the Idaho Air National Guard provided a helicopter to transport a Custer County Search and Rescue team, which reached the crash site at about 11:21 a.m. Thys was found with the wreckage of the aircraft the morning about six miles (10 km) north of Copper Basin near Mackay.
