= Peter Dunnill =

British scientist

Peter Dunnill, OBE, FREng (20 May 1938 – 10 August 2009), was a British pioneer in biochemical engineering and professor at the University College London (UCL), University of London.

== Life ==
Dunnill was born in Harrow, London on 20 May 1938. He studied at the College of North West London. Dunnill self-learned French and German, and obtained his BSc in chemistry from the University College London.

Dunnill continued his study and research at the Royal Institution (RI) where he obtained his PhD in protein crystallography under Nobel Prize laureate Lawrence Bragg. He worked at the Sir John Cass College (now the London Guildhall University).

Dunnill spent his entire academic career at UCL, first as a lecturer in physical methods at the Department of Biology of UCL, and the position of Professor of Biochemical Engineering before his death. He was lecturer (1969), reader (1979), and professor (1984) in biochemical engineering at UCL. Dunnill was a founder of the Advanced Centre for Biochemical Engineering at UCL.

== Recognitions ==
Dunnill was elected to the Biotechnology and Biological Sciences Research Council (BBSRC) in 1994. Dunnill was made a Fellow of UCL in 1981. He was also a Fellow of the Royal Society of Chemistry (elected in 1979), Fellow of the Institution of Chemical Engineers (elected in 1981), and Fellow of the Royal Academy of Engineering. Dunnill was awarded the Donald medal by the Institution of Chemical Engineers in 1995, and was appointed OBE for his services to biochemical engineering in 1999.

== Extra information ==
- The Lancet: Peter Dunnill

Obituaries from major media:

- The Times Online: Professor Peter Dunnill: biochemical engineer
- The Guardian: Peter Dunnill obituary
- The Times Higher Education: Obituary: Peter Dunnill, 1938-2009
