= Gonzalo Santos =

Northern Mariana Islands politician

Gonzalo Q. Santos (died August 4, 2009) was a Northern Mariana Islands teacher, educator and politician. Santos served in the cabinets of two separate Governors as the Director of Labor and an adviser on indigenous affairs in the Commonwealth.

Santos worked in the CNMI Public School System as a teacher and principal for more than 30 years. He served as the director of labor during the administration of Governor Froilan Tenorio, who held office from 1994 until 1998.

Governor Benigno Fitial appointed Santos as his adviser on indigenous affairs, specifically concerning the islands' Chamorro population. Fitial appointed Santos after he took office in 2006 and Santos remained at the position until his death. Santos was reportedly working on several projects as of 2009, including programs to increase awareness of Chamorro cultural practices, a Chamorro-English dictionary, and a project to document herbs and other flora traditionally used by the Chamorro people.

Santos was diagnosed with lung cancer in 2009 during a check-up at the Commonwealth Health Center in Saipan. He remained special adviser for indigenous affairs, though the illness and its treatment had forced him to miss work and government functions in the months before his death.

Santos was admitted to Guam Memorial Hospital on neighboring Guam on July 17, 2009, for treatment. He died at that hospital on August 4, 2009, at the age of 68. He was survived by his wife, Olympia Santos, and their four children.

Gonzalo Santos' body was flown back to the Northern Mariana Islands for a memorial mass at the Kristo Rai Church in Saipan. His viewing and funeral were held at the Nuestra Senora Dela Paz Memorial Chapel. He was buried at the Mount Carmel Cemetery in Saipan.
