= Christos Palaiologos =

Greek politician (1950–2009)

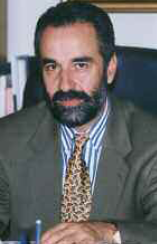

Christos Palaiologos (Greek: Χρήστος Παλαιολόγος; 1950 – 30 August 2009) was a Greek politician. He was born in Livadeia, and studied civil engineering in the Polytechnic School of the Aristotle University of Thessaloniki. He was the Mayor of Livadeia from 1990 to 2002, and a major figure in the leadership of the Coalition of Left, of Movements and Ecology.
