= Idaho Gem =

First cloned mule (born 2003)

The mule Idaho Gem (born May 4, 2003) is the first cloned equine and first cloned mule.

== Background and cloning ==
Cloning equines has historically posed challenges, as horse oocytes do not mature efficiently in vitro, and equine embryos are often slow to divide. Researchers led by Dr. Gordon Woods at the University of Idaho discovered that calcium levels in equine red blood cells are significantly lower than in those of cattle, suggesting that low calcium might hinder embryonic development. By increasing calcium concentrations in the culture medium, they improved embryonic viability. Of 305 embryos transferred into recipient mares, 21 pregnancies reached 14 days, but only those from calcium-enriched cultures progressed to 45 days.

Idaho Gem is the biological sibling of a world-champion racing mule named Taz. The researchers rebred Taz’s parents and extracted a somatic cell from a 45-day-old fetus. This cell was fused with an enucleated horse oocyte, which was then implanted into a mare. Idaho Gem was born after a normal 346-day gestation. He became the first cloned member of the horse family and the first cloned sterile animal; mules, being hybrids of a donkey sire and a horse dam, are infertile. Two more healthy mule clones were born in succeeding months as a result of Project Idaho: Utah Pioneer on June 9, and Idaho Star on July 27. The project was largely financed by Post Falls, Idaho, businessman Don Jacklin, who also served as president of the American Mule Racing Association.

== Racing career ==
Idaho Gem and Idaho Star were transported to trainers in 2005 to prepare them for racing in 2006. Idaho Gem and Idaho Star both won their first races on June 3, 2006, separate trial races for the Humboldt Futurity during the Winnemucca, Nev., Mule Races, Show and Draft Horse Challenge, June 3 and 4. In the June 4 futurity, Idaho Gem finished third and Idaho Star finished seventh. Idaho Gem won his next race at the San Joaquin Fair in Stockton, June 21. His time of 20.724 seconds over the 350-yard course was the fastest time by a 3-year-old mule through the end of July, the halfway point in the mule racing season. Idaho Gem also collected two seconds in photo finishes with the racing mule Out of My League. The total margin of victory between the two mules in the two races was .043 seconds. Through his first six races, Idaho Gem collected two firsts, two seconds a third and a fourth.

On June 4, 2006, Idaho Gem finished 3rd in the Winnemucca Mule Race. This was the first competition between cloned and natural-born mules.

As of 2009, Idaho Gem was owned by Jacklin, who was preparing to have him trained for gymkhana events. The mule was reported to be in good health.

== See also ==
- List of cloned animals
