= Simon Thirgood =

Simon Jeremy Thirgood (6 December 1962 – 30 August 2009) was a Scottish ecologist and conservationist. He was the author of more than 100 scientific papers on deer, mountain hares and moorland management, birds of prey, and conservation problems, and senior editor of the Journal of Applied Ecology. On 30 August 2009, Thirgood was killed in Ethiopia when the building he was in collapsed.
