= Ron Irwin (footballer) =

Australian rules footballer

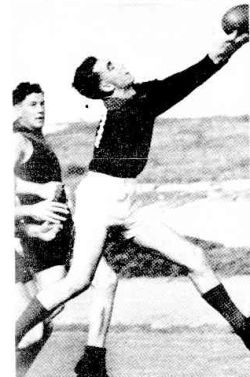

Personal information
- Full name: Ronald Leslie Irwin
- Born: 23 October 1923
- Died: 18 August 2009 (aged 85)
- Original team: Glen Ormond (Victorian Junior Amateur Association)
- Height: 185 cm (6 ft 1 in)
- Weight: 80 kg (176 lb)
- Position: Full back

Playing career^{1}
| Years | Club | Games (Goals) |
| 1943–47 | Melbourne | 51 (0) |
- ^{1} Playing statistics correct to the end of 1947.

Ronald Leslie Irwin (23 October 1923 – 18 August 2009) was an Australian rules footballer who played 51 games as number 3 with Melbourne in the Victorian Football League (VFL) from 1943 to 1947.

Irwin was recruited from Glen Ormond in the Victorian Junior Amateur Association. He also played in the football team of the engineering firm Kelly and Lewis from 1941 to 1943.

In 1950, Irwin was appointed captain-coach of Yarraville in the Victorian Football Association, after missing over 2 years of football due to a knee injury. After playing as a utility player and filling most key positions on the ground in 1950, he retired at the start of the 1951 season, due to a recurrence of his knee injury.
