= Ross Dufty =

Australian cricketer

Personal information
- Born: 13 August 1927; Bingara, Australia
- Died: 4 August 2009 (aged 81); Hobart, Tasmania, Australia

Domestic team information
- Years: Team
- 1953-1961: Tasmania
- Source: Cricinfo, 10 March 2016

Ross Dufty (13 August 1927 – 4 August 2009) was an Australian cricketer. He played two first-class matches for Tasmania between 1953 and 1961.

== See also ==
- List of Tasmanian representative cricketers
