= Nikos Garoufallou =

Greek actor

Nikos Garofallou (1937 – 25 August 2009) was a Greek actor. He was best known for his roles in several theatrical productions and became more widely familiar through his appearances on popular TV series.

Garoufallou died in a traffic collision in Athens, Greece. He was 72.
