= Talbots =

American women's fashion company

The Talbots, Inc.

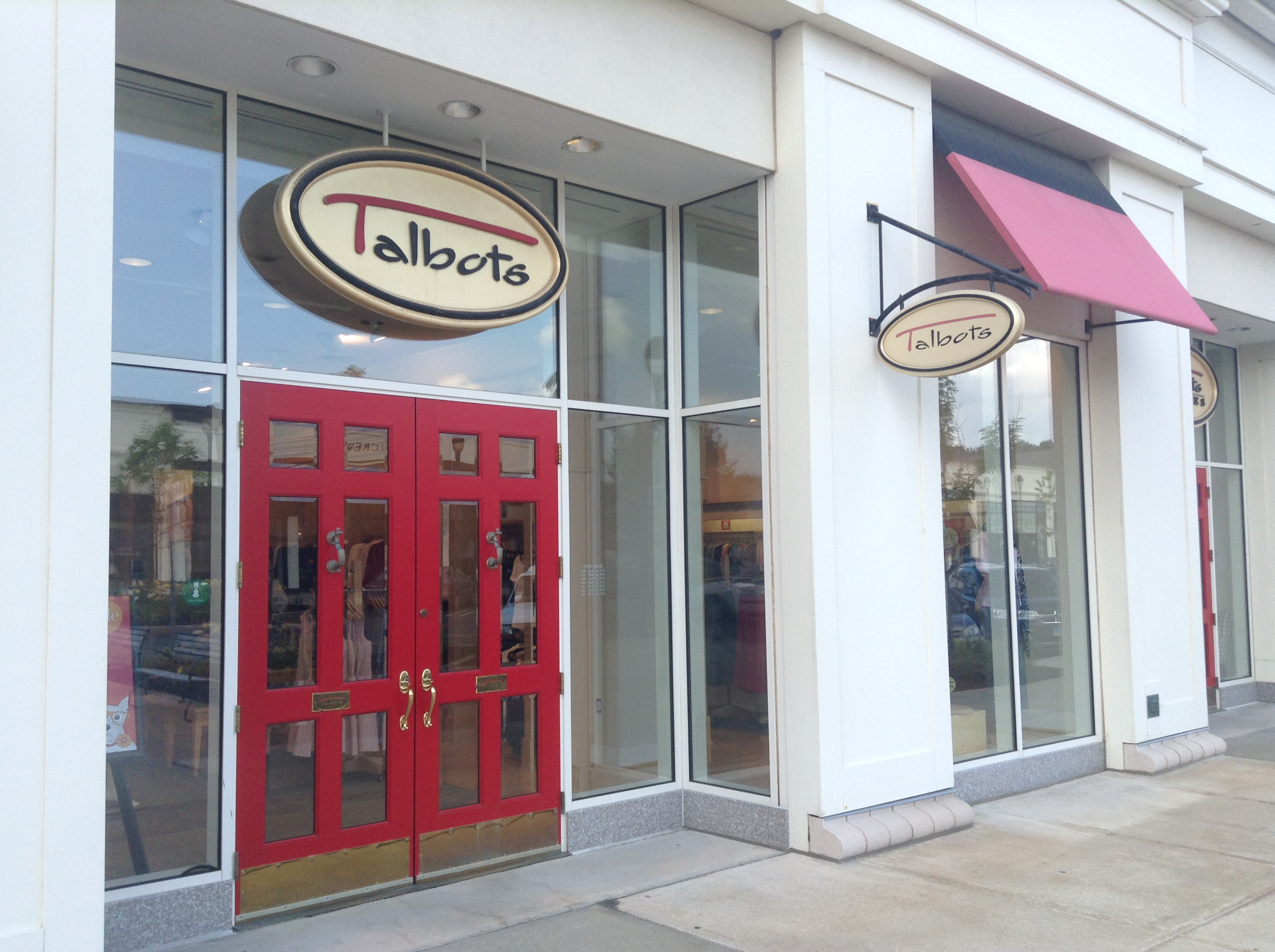
- Talbots store in Manchester, Connecticut
- Trade name: Talbots
- Type: Private
- Industry: Fashion
- Founded: 1947; 79 years ago Hingham, Massachusetts, U.S.
- Founder: Rudolf Talbot; Nancy Talbot
- Headquarters: Hingham, Massachusetts, U.S.
- Number of locations: 493 (February 2021)
- Key people: Lizanne Kindler (CEO)
- Products: Clothing, shoes and accessories
- Revenue: US$ 2 billion (2021)
- Owner: Sycamore Partners
- Number of employees: 8,894 (2021)
- Website: www.talbots.com

The Talbots, Inc., doing business as Talbots and stylized as TALBOTS, is an American specialty retailer and direct marketer of women's clothing, shoes and fashion accessories.

As of 2018, the company operated 495 Talbots stores in the United States: 425 core Talbots stores (412 U.S), 65 Talbots Factory Outlets (U.S.) and five Talbots Clearance stores (4 US).

== History ==
The first shop, located in Hingham, Massachusetts, was opened in 1947 by Rudolf and Nancy Talbot. In 1948, the Talbots launched a direct mail business by distributing 3,000 fliers to names obtained from The New Yorker magazine. In 1973, they sold the company, consisting of a growing catalog enterprise and five stores, to General Mills.

The chain was expanded along the U.S. east coast. When General Mills divested its Specialty Retail Division in 1988, Talbots was acquired by JUSCO Co. Ltd. (now ÆON Co., Ltd.).

Talbots became a public company in 1993 and was traded on the New York Stock Exchange under the symbol TLB. The New York City-based private equity firm Sycamore Partners acquired Talbots in August 2012 for $391 million (including debt).
