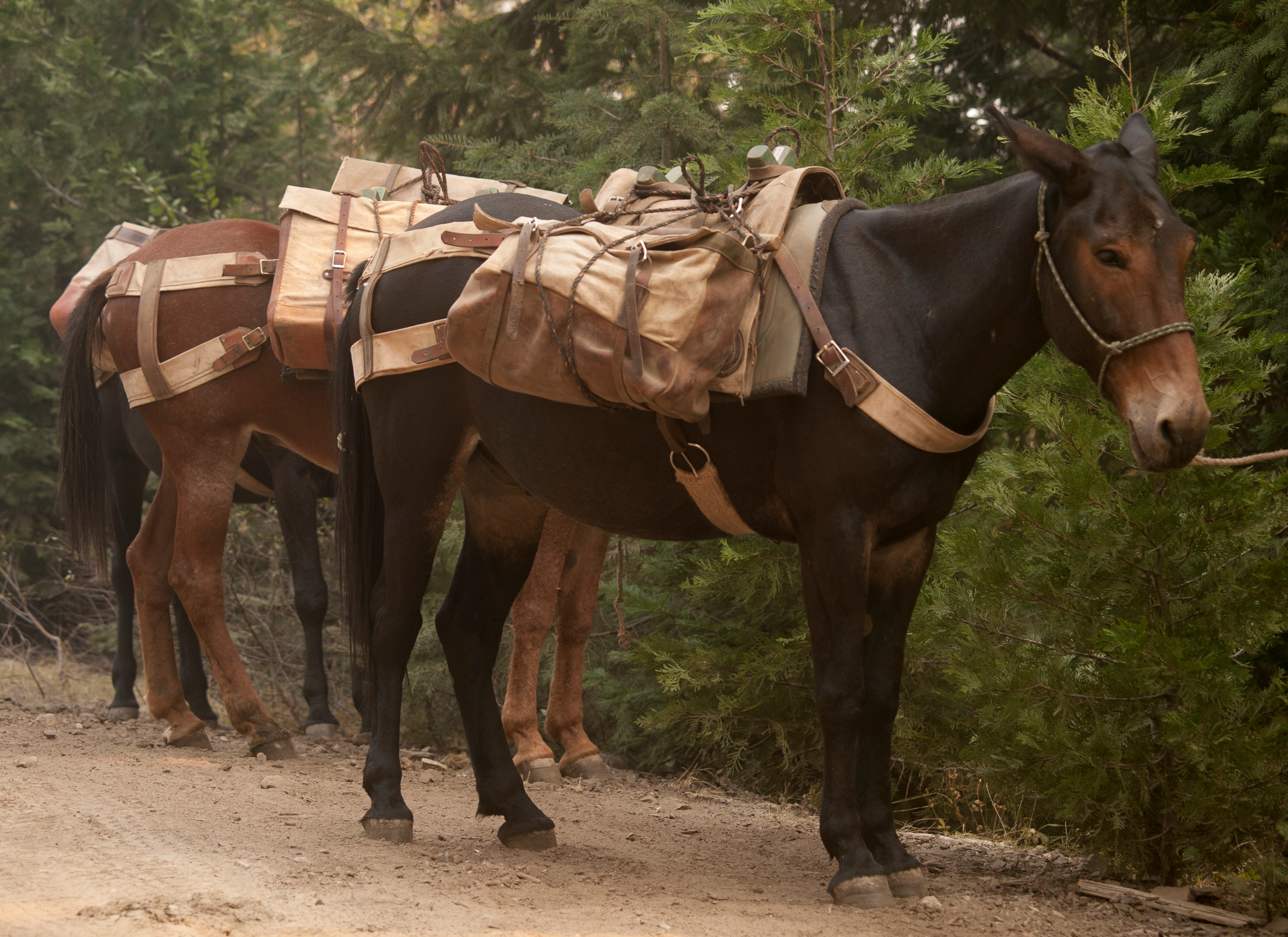
- Pack mules supplying firefighters in the Klamath National Forest

Conservation status
- Domesticated

Scientific classification
- Kingdom: Animalia
- Phylum: Chordata
- Class: Mammalia
- Order: Perissodactyla
- Family: Equidae
- Subtribe: Equina
- Genus: Equus
- Species: E. africanus asinus♂ × E. ferus caballus♀

= Mule =

Domestic hybrid of horse and donkey

The mule is a domestic equine hybrid between a donkey and a horse. It is the offspring of a male donkey (a jack) and a female horse (a mare). The horse and the donkey are different species, with different numbers of chromosomes; of the two possible first-generation hybrids between them, the mule is easier to obtain and more common than the hinny, which is the offspring of a male horse (a stallion) and a female donkey (a jenny).

Mules vary widely in size, and may be of any colour seen in horses or donkeys. They are more patient, hardier and longer-lived than horses, and are perceived as less obstinate and more intelligent than donkeys.

== Terminology ==
A female mule is called a molly, a Molly mule, or more formally mare mule. A male mule is called a john, John mule, or more formally horse mule. A young male mule is called a mule colt, and a young female is called a mule filly. The donkey used to produce mules is called a mule jack, and a group of mules is often called a pack, though the words barren and span also apply.

== History ==
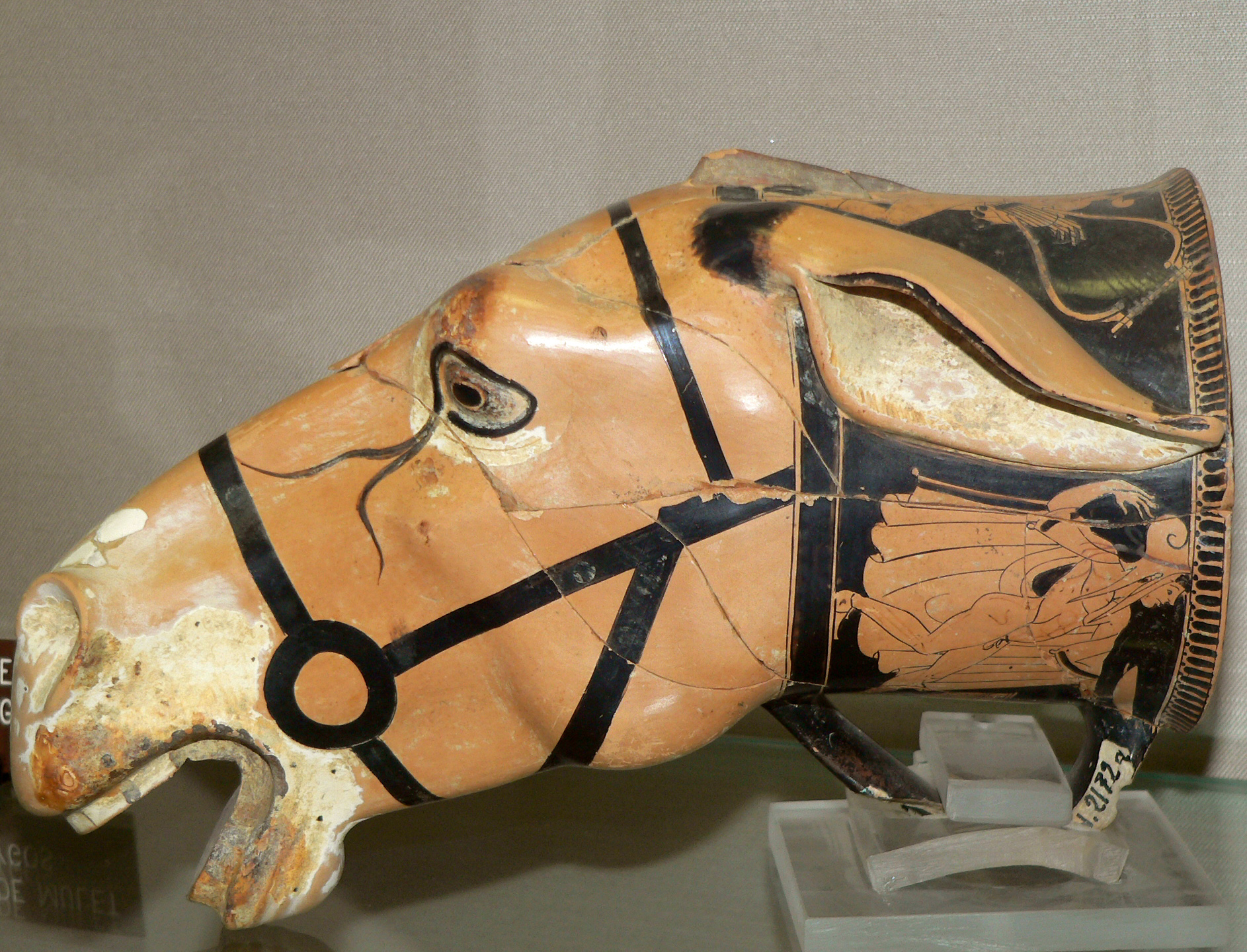
Early fifth century BC Greek rhyton (cup) in the shape of the head of a mule, made by Brygos

Breeding of mules became possible only when the range of the domestic horse, which originated in Central Asia in about 3500 BC, extended into that of the domestic ass, which originated in north-eastern Africa. This overlap probably occurred in Anatolia and Mesopotamia in Western Asia, and mules were bred there before 1000 BC.

The Hittites, a people of Asia Minor known for their horse-riding skills, held mules in higher esteem than their best horses; the price of a mule was three times that of a good horse. Similarly, mules were seven times as valuable as donkeys to the Sumerians.

A painting in the Tomb of Nebamun at Thebes, dating from approximately 1350 BC, shows a chariot drawn by a pair of animals which have been variously identified as onagers, mules or hinnies. Mules were present in Israel and Judah in the time of King David. There are many representations of them in Mesopotamian works of art dating from the first millennium BC. Among the bas-reliefs depicting the Lion Hunt of Ashurbanipal from the North Palace of Nineveh is a clear and detailed image of two mules loaded with nets for hunting.

Homer noted their arrival in Asia Minor in the Iliad in 800 BC.

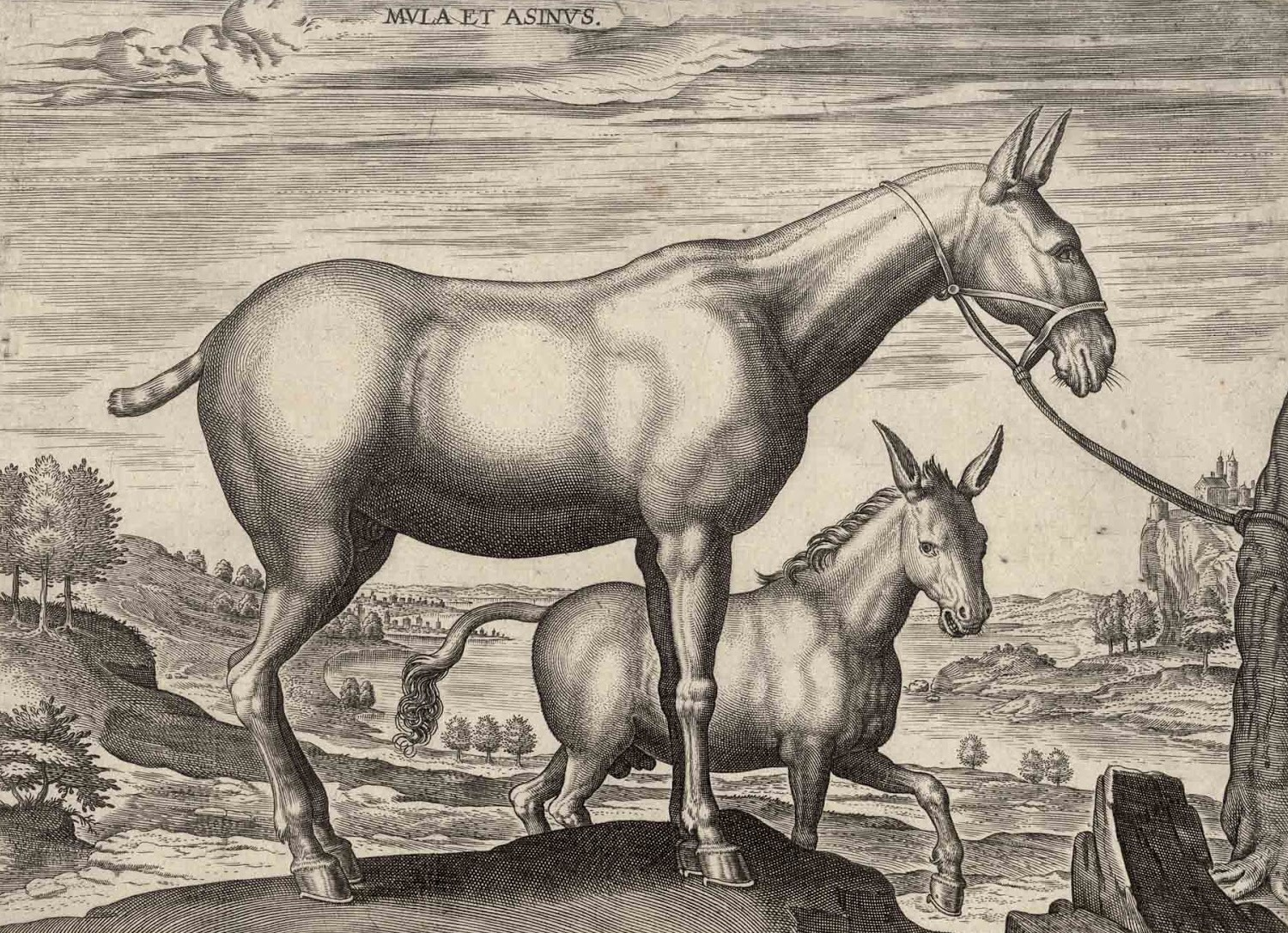
Engraving from 1578, Mule and Ass

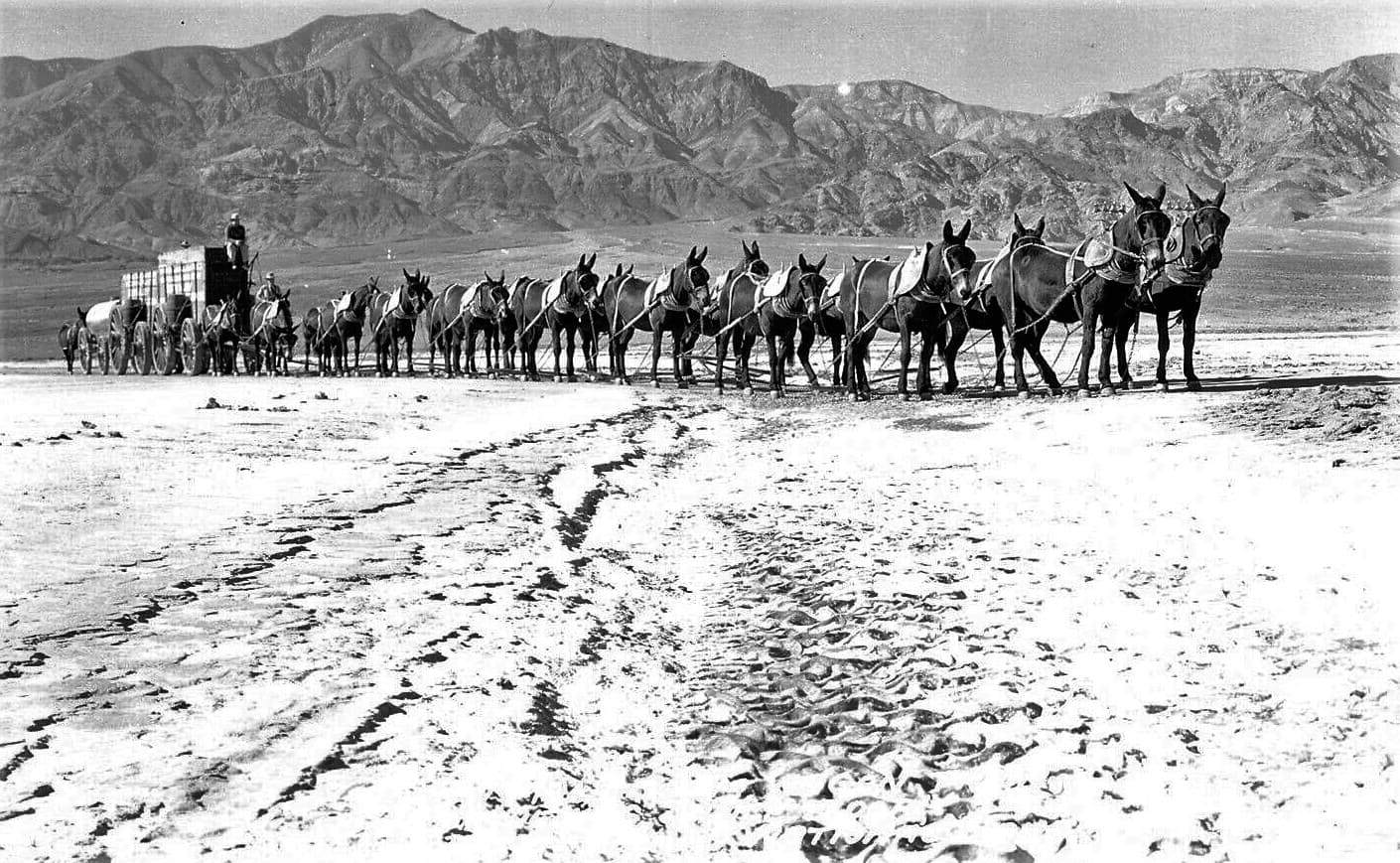
A 20-mule team in Death Valley, California in the 1880s

After the American Revolutionary War, George Washington bred mules at his Virginia estate of Mount Vernon. Often called the "father of the American mule," George Washington sent his donkeys to a multitude of American farms to breed with horses and create mules. Washington found that mules work harder and longer than horses at the same tasks. They also need less food and water than horses. In 1785, he had 132 horses at Mount Vernon. In 1799, there were 27 horses, 20 donkeys, and 63 mules. Before then, mules were not common in the United States, but Washington understood their value, as they were "more docile than donkeys and cheaper to maintain."

By the nineteenth century, mules had become favored draught animals on farms and for pulling boats. Their numbers in the US reached 885,000, though they remained more popular in the south than the north. Most notably, twenty-mule teams of eighteen mules and two horses pulled wagonloads of borax out of Death Valley, California from 1883 to 1889. They pulled wagons carrying 10 short tons (9 metric tons) of borax ore during trips to the Borate mines before being replaced by railroads.

Mules were used by armies to transport supplies, occasionally as mobile firing platforms for smaller cannons, and to pull heavier field guns with wheels over mountainous trails such as in Afghanistan during the Second Anglo-Afghan War.

In the second half of the twentieth century, widespread use of mules declined in industrialised countries. The use of mules for farming and for transportation of agricultural products largely gave way to diesel-powered tractors and transportation.

The first cloned equine was a mule foal, Idaho Gem, who was cloned by nuclear transfer of cells from foetal material, and was born at the University of Idaho in Moscow, Idaho, United States on May 5, 2003. Neither an equid nor a hybrid animal had been cloned before that time.

As of 2018, Mexico had the largest population of mules in the world at 3,287,449.

== Characteristics ==
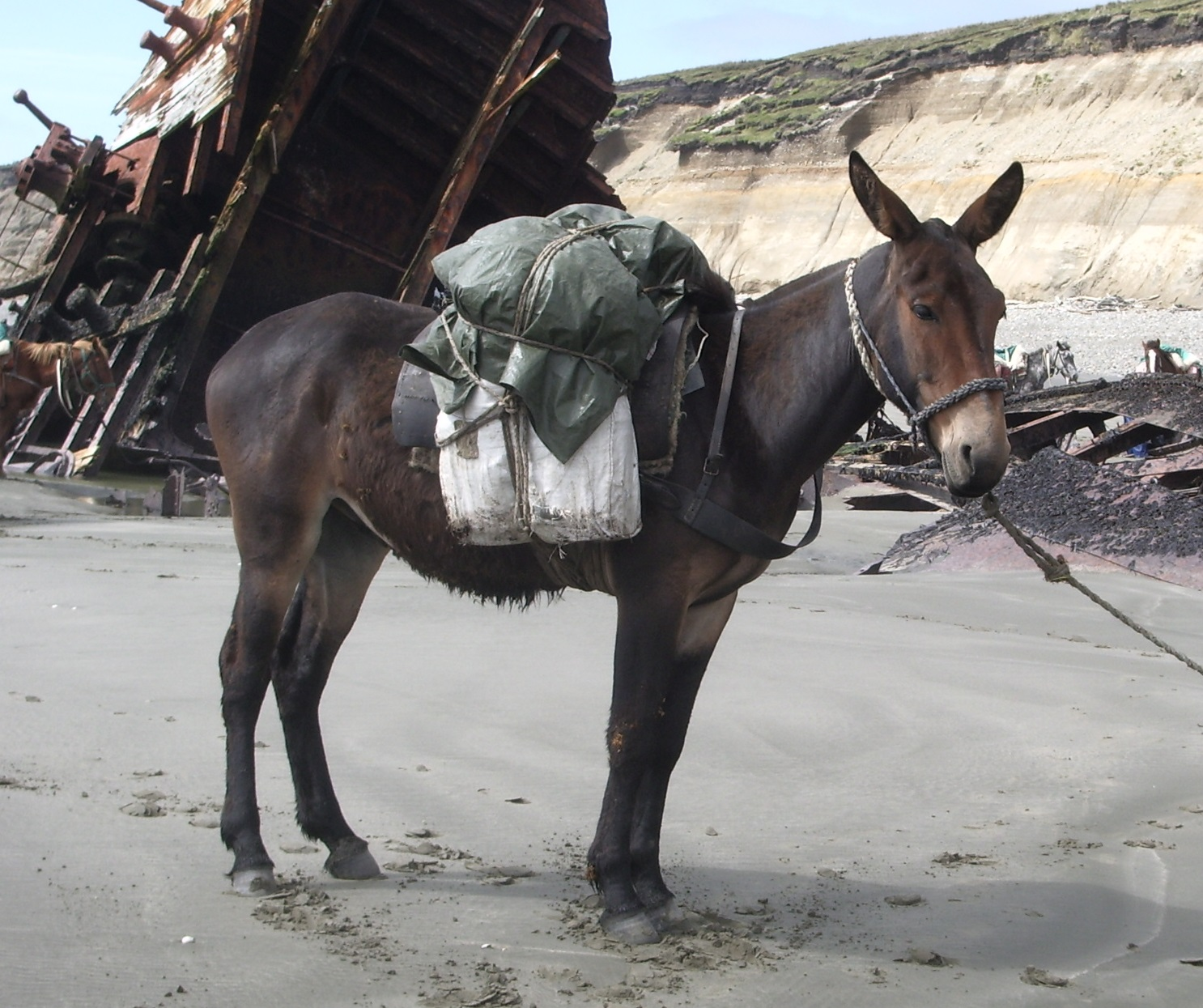
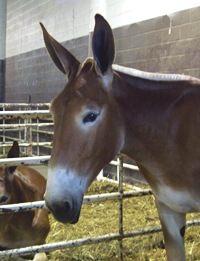
Typical shape and colouration of mules

In general terms, in both mules and hinnies, the foreparts and head of the animal are similar to those of the sire (father), while the hindparts and tail tend to resemble those of the dam (mother). Mules are generally larger than hinnies, with longer ears and a heavier head like donkeys, while their tails are usually covered with long hair like that of horses. Mules have thin limbs, small narrow hooves, and short manes like donkeys, while their height, shape of neck and body, and uniformity of their coat and teeth are more similar to what is seen in horses.

Depending upon the characteristics of the dam, mules can vary widely in size, from small miniature mules under 125 cm (50 in) to large and powerful draught mules standing up to 180 cm (70 in) at the withers. The median weight range is between about 370 and 460 kg (820 and 1000 lb).

Mules' coats may be of any colour seen in the horse or donkey. Mules usually display the light points commonly seen in donkeys: pale or mealy areas on the belly and the insides of the thighs, on the muzzle, and around the eyes. They often have primitive markings such as dorsal stripes, shoulder stripes, or zebra stripes on the legs.

Mules exhibit hybrid vigor. Charles Darwin wrote: "The mule always appears to me a most surprising animal. That a hybrid should possess more reason, memory, obstinacy, social affection, powers of muscular endurance, and length of life, than either of its parents, seems to indicate that art has here outdone nature."

Mules inherit from donkeys the traits of intelligence, sure-footedness, toughness, endurance, disposition, and natural cautiousness; from horses, they inherit speed, conformation, and agility. They grow faster and live longer, giving them a larger interval of productivity compared to horses or donkeys. They rarely become ill, unlike horses, who often need to be checked for worms, and like their donkey fathers, mules can see their hind legs and have hooves better suited to dry climates. Additionally, the skin of mules is tougher than that of horses or donkeys, and they tend to live longer on fewer resources than do horses. Mules are reputed to exhibit a higher cognitive intelligence than both of their parent species, but robust scientific evidence to back up these claims is lacking. Preliminary data exists from at least two evidence-based studies, but it relies on a limited set of specialized cognitive tests and a small number of subjects.

Similar to other equine animals, mules can sleep while standing (mostly to protect themselves against danger). To prevent predation, a group of mules may select members of the pack to "stand watch" while sleeping upright as the others sleep on the ground.

== Fertility ==
Live mules

The speciation of horses and donkeys from their common ancestor happened sometime between 7.7 and 15.4 million years ago. Today, they are phenotypically and genetically different, with a horse having 64 chromosomes and a donkey having 62. A mule has 63 chromosomes, 32 from the horse and 31 from the donkey. Its odd number of chromosomes makes gamete formation difficult, often leaving mules infertile. This also disqualifies them as a species under the biological species model.

The conception of a mule is difficult due to the differences in behavior and mating patterns between donkeys and horses. When in close proximity, groups of horses and groups of donkeys do not interact with each other often, and donkeys remain at the bottom of the equine social hierarchy while horses rule the pasture and mules are left in a mid-tier social caste.

Mule pregnancy is rare, but can occasionally occur naturally, as well as through embryo transfer. A few mare mules have produced offspring when mated with a horse or a jack. Herodotus gives an account of such an event as an ill omen of Xerxes' invasion of Greece in 480 BC: "There happened also a portent of another kind while he was still at Sardis—a mule brought forth young and gave birth to a mule" (Herodotus The Histories 7:57), and a mule's giving birth was a frequently recorded portent in antiquity, although scientific writers also doubted whether it was really possible (see e.g. Aristotle, Historia animalium, 6.24; Varro, De re rustica, 2.1.28). Between 1527 and 2002, approximately sixty such births were reported. In Morocco in early 2002 and Colorado in 2007, mare mules produced colts. Blood and hair samples from the Colorado birth verified that the mother was indeed a mule and the foal was indeed her offspring.

A 1939 article in the Journal of Heredity describes two offspring of a fertile mare mule named "Old Bec," which was owned at the time by Texas A&M University in the late 1920s. One of the foals was a female, sired by a jack. Unlike her mother, she was sterile. The other, sired by a five-gaited Saddlebred stallion, exhibited no characteristics of any donkey. That horse, a stallion, was bred to several mares, which gave birth to live foals that showed no characteristics of the donkey. In 1995, a group from the Federal University of Minas Gerais described a female mule that was pregnant for a seventh time, having previously produced two donkey sires, two foals with the typical 63 chromosomes of mules, and several horse stallions that had produced four foals. The three of the latter available for testing each bore 64 horse-like chromosomes. These foals phenotypically resembled horses, though they bore markings absent from the sire's known lineages, and one had ears noticeably longer than those typical of her sire's breed. The elder two horse-like foals had proved fertile at the time of publication, with their progeny being typical of horses.

== Use ==
Mules are commonly used as pack animals. While a few mules can carry live weight up to 160 kg (353 lb), mules can generally be packed with dead weight up to around 90 kg (198 lb). Although it depends on the individual animal, mules trained by the Army of Pakistan are reported to be able to carry up to 72 kg (159 lb) and walk 26 km (16.2 mi) without resting. Mule trains are also used to deliver food to remote areas of the world: for example, the World Food Programme provides food for children in the Sudurpashchim Province in Nepal with the help of mule drivers.

Mules also have uses beyond heavy lifting. In the Abruzzo region of Italy, for example, mules are used to defend herds of animals against predators like wolves and feral dogs. Horse breeders in Italy used to add a female mule to their flocks, finding that the mule tended to protect the foals with even more vigor than the actual mother. They are additionally used as research specimens, especially in studies regarding the slicing, rearrangement, and compatibility of chromosomes.

Contemporary use of mules

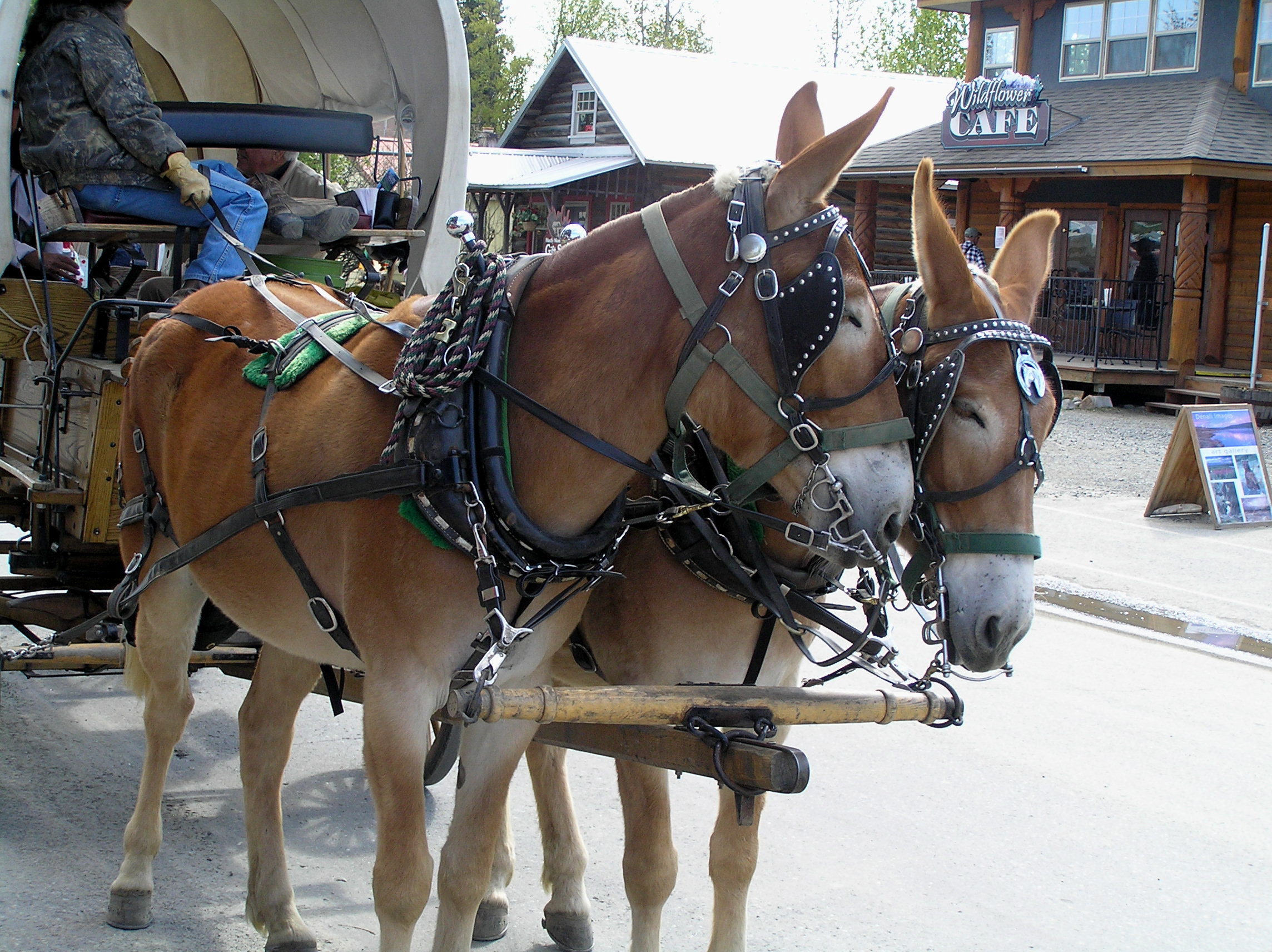
Pair, pulling a wagon (2008)

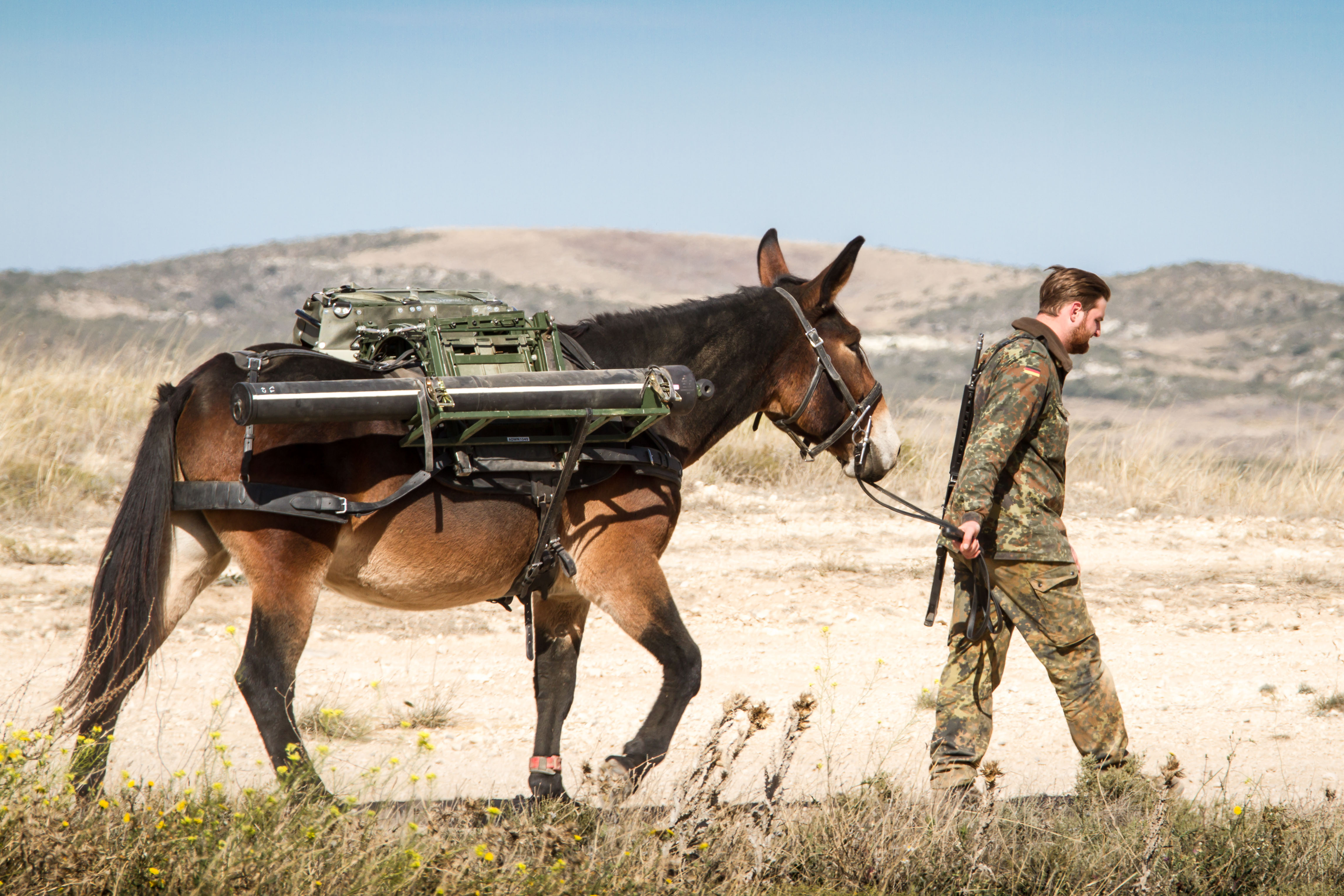
Army mule (2015)

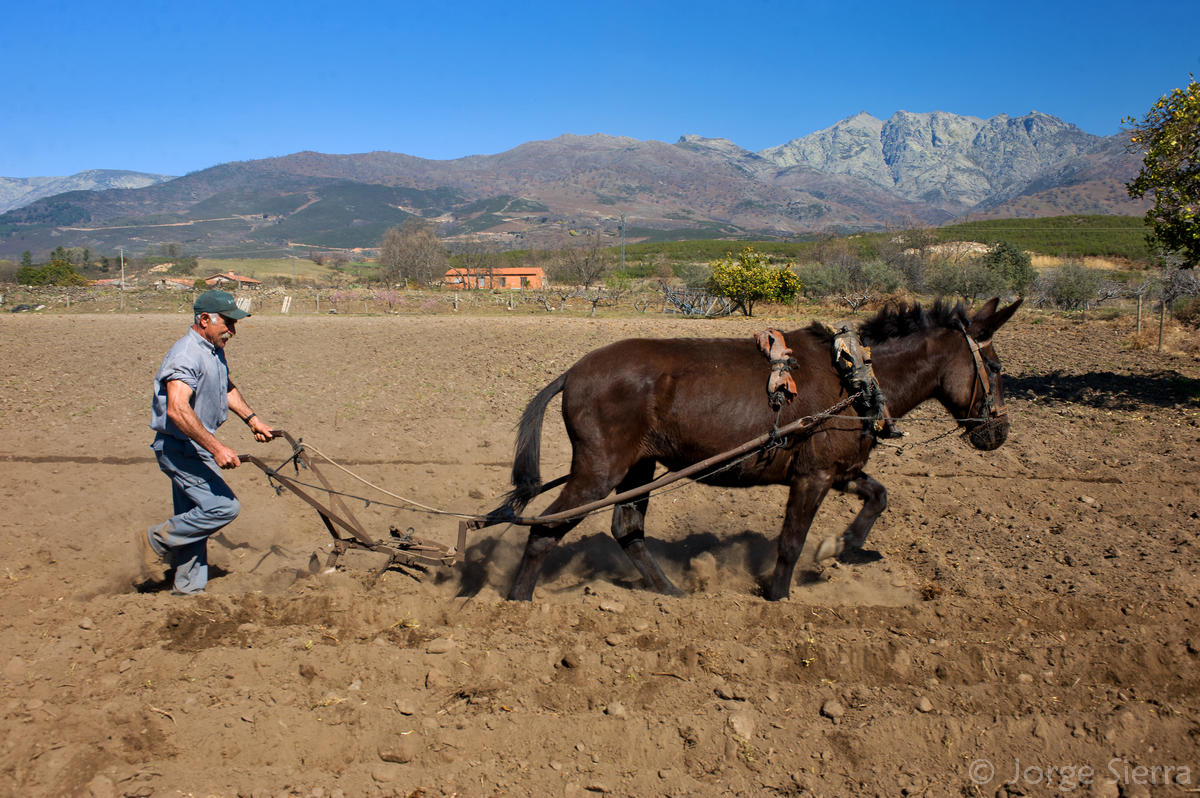
Plowing (2012)

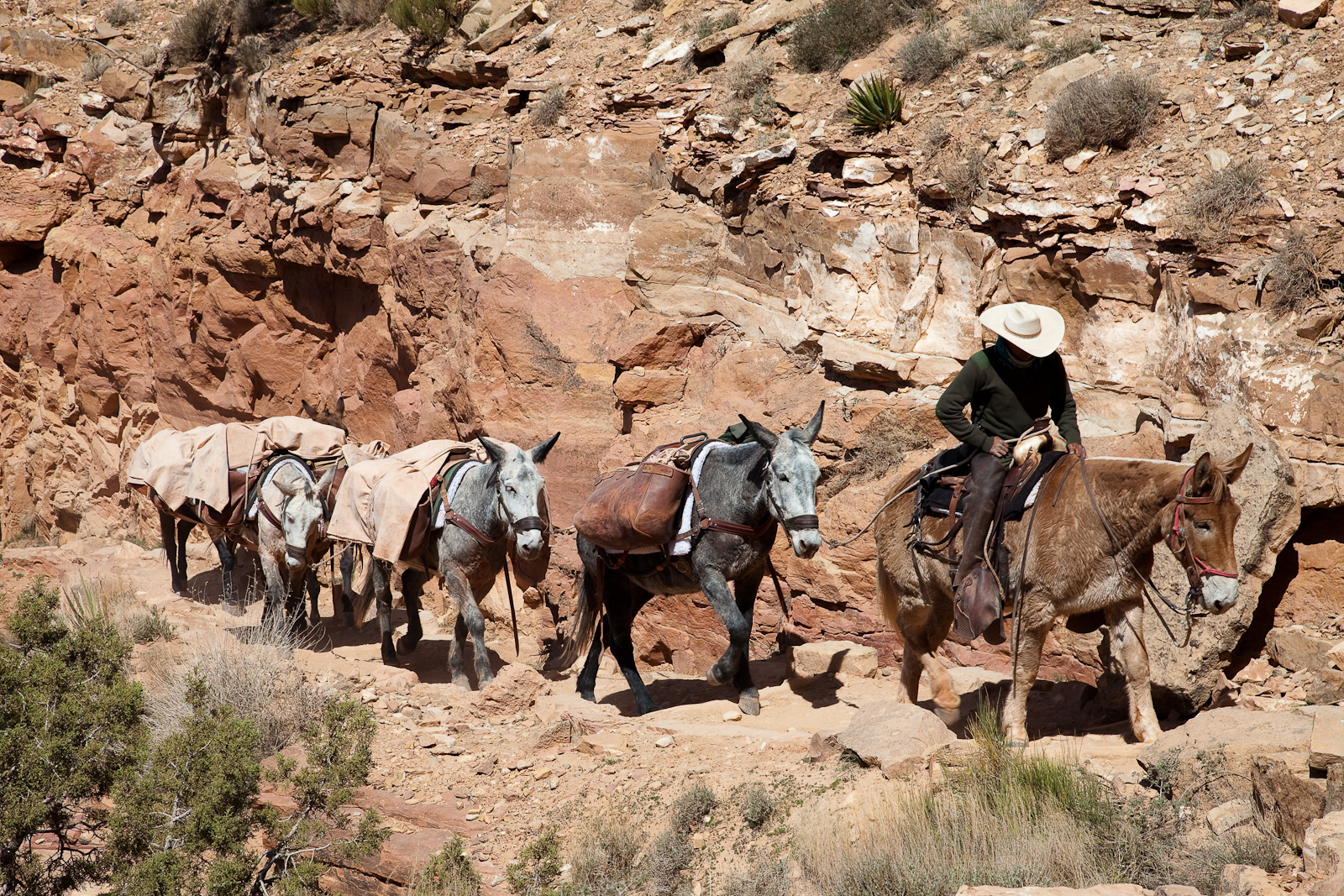
Supply train in the Grand Canyon (2009)

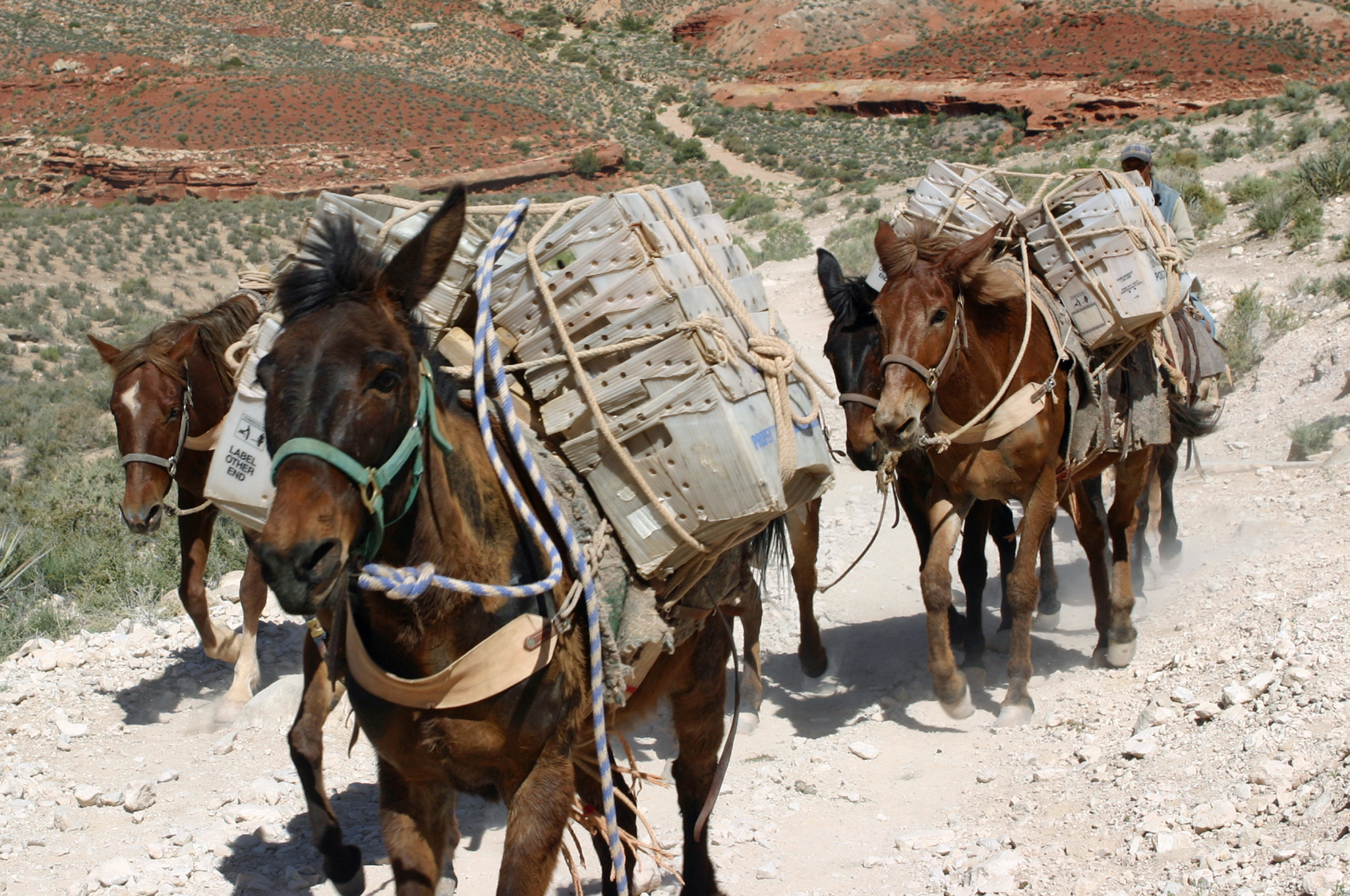
Carrying the mail in rural Arizona (2008)

== Care and management ==
A mule's diet is more similar to that of a donkey than a horse. They store water more efficiently, for example, and can consume 15 gallons of it daily, making them suitable for more desert-like climates. Their diet is also herbivorous, mainly consisting of grains, hay and greens, though they can also enjoy fruits and vegetables. Mules can have dietary preferences based on taste and texture. Additionally, protein intake can be an issue with mules, so monitoring the amount of essential amino acids in their diet can be helpful.

A mule's hooves should be cleaned regularly to remove debris and should be shortened at least every two months to prevent overgrowth, pain, and discomfort. If necessary, mules may also wear muleshoes to protect their hooves, and generally wear a smaller horseshoe than a horse of the same size, due to their smaller and narrower hooves. A mule's coat needs to be groomed regularly.

An adult mule's temperature should remain within the range of 37.5–38.5 °C, their pulse has a healthy range of 26–40 bpm, and they should take 8–16 breaths per minute.
