= David Avadon =

American magician

- Born: December 11, 1948; Inglewood, California
- Died: August 22, 2009 (aged 60); Santa Monica, California
- Occupations: Magician, illusionist
- Website: www.davidavadon.com

David Avadon (December 11, 1948 – August 22, 2009), formerly "David Hutchins," was an American illusionist who billed himself as the country's "premier exhibition pickpocket." He lectured and wrote a book on pickpocketing and performed his trademark theatrical pickpocketing act for more than 30 years.

== Early years ==
Avadon was born in Inglewood, California, his mother being an acrobatic dancer and his father an engineer. Avadon grew up in West Los Angeles and began practicing magic as a hobby while in elementary school. He studied theater at UCLA and studied magic with Dr. Giovanni and Marian Chavez.

== Professional illusionist ==
In his 20s, he changed his name from David Hutchins to David Avadon. He began appearing as a professional illusionist at the Magic Castle in Hollywood and other clubs in the 1970s. He remained a regular performer at the Magic Castle for more than 30 years. After Avadon's death in 2009, Mark Nelson, chairman of the Academy of Magical Arts which operates the Magic Castle, said that Avadon's "performances included an equal balance of mystery and comedy," and added that "David always gave a polished, assured performance, drawing laughter and amazement."

== Illusion and illumination services ==
Avadon gained national attention in 1977 when he began working with a rabbi at a synagogue in the San Fernando Valley of Los Angeles. The rabbi saw Avadon performing for children outside the Los Angeles County Museum of Art and was impressed. Avadon, who was Jewish, and the rabbi teamed up to jointly present Sabbath services which were called "illusion-and-illumination service." While the rabbi told a Biblical story "from the shadows of the temple's altar turned-stage," Avadon contributed visual aids and illusions from center stage. Avadon illustrated the burning bush with "a fire that seemed to be burning from his hand." Attendance at the Sabbath services rose from the usual 150 or 200 worshipers to crowds of 750, including many children, when Avadon began participating.

== America's "premier exhibition pickpocket" ==
Avadon developed a stage act featuring his talent as a pickpocket. Avadon's pickpocketing act became his trademark. In his act, Avadon invited audience members onto the stage to observe his illusions and would then return an array of possessions, including watches, wallets, checkbooks, keys, belts and neckties, that he had lifted from the unsuspecting observers. Avadon promoted himself as "a daring pickpocket with dashing finesse" and "the country's premier exhibition pickpocket, one of the few masters in the world of this underground art." He performed his pickpocket act in the United States, Japan, Canada and Great Britain.

== Technical expertise ==
Avadon became a recognized expert on pickpocketing. In addition to his stage act, he educated police officers and security guards on techniques for spotting pickpockets and lectured on the topic. He was also a technical advisor on pickpocketing for television and motion pictures. In 2007, Avadon wrote a book about the history of pickpocketing, Cutting Up Touches: A Brief History of Pockets and the People Who Pick Them.

== Writings ==
Avadon contributed to a book on the noted magician, Joe Berg.

== Death ==
In August 2009, Avadon died from a heart attack while exercising at a fitness club in Santa Monica, California. His interment was at Hollywood Forever Cemetery.
