= Keith Kirton =

South African cricketer (1928–2009)

Personal information
- Born: 28 February 1928; King William's Town, South Africa
- Died: 3 August 2009 (aged 81); Benoni, South Africa
- Source: Cricinfo, 6 December 2020

Keith Kirton (28 February 1928 – 3 August 2009) was a South African cricketer. He played in 73 first-class matches from 1947/48 to 1963/64.
