= Svetlana Fedorenko =

Russian aviator

Svetlana Vasilevna Fedorenko (Russian: Светла́на Васи́льевна Федоре́нко; 11 November 1972 – 16 August 2009) was a Russian aviator and world champion aerobatics pilot.

Fedorenko began flying and aerobatics in 1990. In 1995 she qualified as an instructor at the Chkalov National Aeroclub of Moscow and became a member of the Russian National Aerobatic team. The following year, she completed further training at the Kaluga Aviation Flying-Technical School.

Fedorenko competed in the World Aerobatic Championships on a number of occasions. In 1996, she was ranked 11th in the women's division; in 1998 she was ranked 5th; in 2000 she was ranked 3rd and in 2001 she was ranked 2nd. In both 2003 and 2005 she was ranked 3rd. She also competed in the European Aerobatic Championships, winning the women's division twice (in 1999 and 2004) and finishing second in 2006.

Fedorenko died in an aviation accident on 16 August 2009. She was an instructor on board a Yak-52 aircraft with her student, a cadet from the Ulyanovsk Aviation Institute. The aircraft crashed shortly after take-off from Drakino Airfield, near Moscow. An aircraft technical failure was considered the cause of the accident.
