= Nancy Talbot =

American businesswoman

- Born: Nancy Orr; August 17, 1920; Charlevoix, Michigan
- Died: August 30, 2009 (aged 89); Boulder, Colorado
- Other name: Nancy Talbot
- Education: Radcliffe College
- Occupation: businesswoman
- Known for: founding Talbots
- Spouse: Rudolf

Nancy Talbot (August 17, 1920 – August 30, 2009) was an American businesswoman who co-founded the Talbots women's retail clothing chain with her husband, Rudolf Talbot.

== Early life and career ==
Nancy Orr was born in 1920 in Charlevoix, Michigan, which was the location of her family's summer home. She was raised in Chicago, Illinois. She graduated from The Shipley School in Bryn Mawr, Pennsylvania, a private prep school. Nancy went on to attend Radcliffe College for one year, but left in 1944 to take a position with the Red Cross. The Red Cross assigned her to a military reconnaissance unit in France near the end of World War II where she met her future husband, Rudolf Talbot. The couple married in 1945.

The couple returned to the United States. Her father-in-law opened a Johnny Appleseed clothing store in Hingham, Massachusetts, in 1945, but died suddenly, which forced Rudolf Talbot to take over the business. Rudolf Talbot dropped the Johnny Appleseed franchise in 1947, because he disliked the clothing he was selling. Rudolf and Nancy started a new clothing store, which they first called "The Talbots." The business eventually became known as Talbots and soon moved to a single-family clapboard house in Hingham, Massachusetts. The couple painted the Talbots store's door red, which remains a trademark of Talbots stores up to the present day.

In 1949, the couple distributed 3,000 fliers to potential customers from The New Yorker's mailing list. This was a precursor to the company's catalog, launched in 1952.

Nancy and Rudolf opened three new stores in Connecticut and Massachusetts during the next 10 years to target female consumers who were relocating to the suburbs following World War II. Rudolf Talbot focused on expanding the Talbots company, while Nancy worked as the company's buyer, purchasing agent and held creative control over the merchandise. They gradually dropped their men's and children's clothing lines to focus exclusively on women's apparel.

The Talbots sold their company, along with its four existing stores at the time, to General Mills in 1973. In the late 1980s, the company expanded into California.

Nancy Talbot remained at Talbots as a vice president until her retirement in 1983. By the time she retired, Talbots had grown to approximately 30 stores with a catalog circulation of more than 10 million copies per year. As of 2009, Talbots had 586 locations and more than $1.5 billion in revenue.

== Personal life ==
Nancy Talbot married Rudolph Talbot in 1945. The couple had two daughters, six grandchildren and six great-grandchildren. Rudolf Talbot died in 1987.

Nancy Talbot died from complications of Alzheimer's disease on August 30, 2009, at her home in Boulder, Colorado, at the age of 89.
