= Devendra Nath Dwivedi =

Indian politician

- Born: 30 March 1935
- Died: 1 August 2009 (aged 74); Delhi, India
- Occupation(s): Indian politician, Governor designate of Gujarat, General Secretary of AICC, Additional Solicitor General of India & Supreme Court Lawyer. He was a Congress member of the Rajya Sabha from 1974 to 1980.

Devendra Nath Dwivedi (30 March 1935 – 1 August 2009) was an Indian politician and the Governor designate of Gujarat. He was a Congress member of the Rajya Sabha from 1974 to 1980. He died on 1 August 2009 aged 74, before he could formally take up the post of Gujarat's Governor.
