= Mark Pringle =

Australian triathlete

Personal information
- Nationality: Australian
- Born: October 6, 1959 Sydney, Australia
- Died: August 30, 2009 (aged 49) Abu Dhabi, United Arab Emirates

Sport
- Sport: Triathlon

Mark Pringle (died 30 August 2009) was an Australian national triathlon champion.

Pringle was knocked down in a hit and run incident in Abu Dhabi on 24 July 2009. He subsequently died from his injuries on 30 August 2009, aged 50.
