= Mbah Surip =

- Born: Urip Achmad Rijanto; 6 May 1949; Mojokerto, East Java, Indonesia
- Died: 4 August 2009 (aged 60) Jakarta, Indonesia
- Genres: Pop, Reggae
- Occupation: Singer
- Instrument: Guitar
- Years active: 1989–2009
- Labels: Falcon Music

Mbah Surip (born Urip Achmad Ariyanto; 6 May 1949 – 4 August 2009) was an Indonesian singer. He was known for his singles "Tak Gendong" (I'll Carry) and "Bangun Tidur" (Wake up from sleep).

== Biography ==
Mbah Surip was born Urip Achmadriyanto in May 1949 in Mojokerto, East Java.

He studied University of Sunan Giri in Surabaya. He earned a degree in geology that led him to a career in mining and traveled to Texas, Canada and Jordan.

In 1996, he returned to Jakarta and joined several art communities, and began busking. Later, he changed his name to Surip after studying "S" philosophy. In 2003, he made his first television appearance, as an announcer on the year's AMI Awards .

He made several albums like Ijo Royo-Royo (The Green of the Green) in 1997, which was followed by another four records: Indonesia and Reformasi (Reform), both in 1998; Tak Gendong (I Carry You on My Back) in 2003 and Barang Baru (New Stuff) in 2004. His single "Tak Gendong" became a hit as ringtone. He reportedly received around Rp4.5 billion (US$450,000) for the royalties. According to Pasundan Ekspress, "Tak Gendong" was composed in 1983.

He died of a suspected heart attack, according to a team of doctors at 10.30 a.m. on 4 August 2009 on the way to Pusdikkes hospital. He was buried on Tuesday night at 11:10 p.m. in a cemetery inside poet WS Rendra's art workshop compound in Depok, West Java.

== Styles ==
Mbah Surip had a dreadlocks hairstyle and reggae-style outfits. He was remembered for his laugh and tagline "I love you full". President Yudhoyono described him as “a down-to-earth artist who dedicated his life to develop his art in his own way”.

== Personal life ==
Mbah Surip had four children named Tita, Varid, Risna and Ivo. Their initials formed TVRI, because he wanted to perform at TVRI.

== Bibliography ==
- Yudono, Jodhi (2009). Mbah Surip, We Love You Full. Jakarta: Grasindo. ISBN 978-979-025-894-5.
