= Zarema Sadulayeva =

Murdered Russian activist

Zarema Sadulayeva (Russian: Зарема Садулаева, 1974 – 10 August 2009) was a Russian children's activist and head of the aid organization Let's Save the Generation, based in Chechnya. She and her husband, Alik Djabrailov (11 August 1976 – 10 August 2009), were found murdered in August 2009.

== Biography ==
She was head of the Let's Save the Generation charity of Chechnya. Her charity works with Unicef to aid Chechen children affected by the violence which has swept the Caucasus region since the 1990s. The charity provides psychological counseling and physical aid to orphans, disabled children and others affected by the wars against Chechen separatists.

Sadulayeva and Djabrailov, who was also active in the charity, married in 2009. Neither were described as politically active.

== Kidnapping, death, and aftermath ==
Sadulayeva and Djabrailov were kidnapped at the aid organization's office by gunmen wearing camouflage uniforms on 9 August 2009. They were both found shot to death in the trunk of Djabrailov's car on 10 August 2009, in Chernorechye, a suburb of Grozny.

Zarema Sadulayeva's death follows the similar kidnapping and murder of human rights activist Natalia Estemirova in Chechnya in July 2009.

== See also ==
- List of kidnappings
- Lists of solved missing person cases
